= Timeline of Sacramento, California =

Coordinates: 38.555556°N 121.468889°W

The following is a timeline of the history of the city of Sacramento, California, United States.

== 19th century ==
- 1839 – Sutter's Fort (or “New Helvetia”) established.
- 1845 – New Helvetia Cemetery established, the first cemetery in the city
- 1849
  - Sacramento City founded by John Sutter, Jr. and Sam Brannan.
  - William Stout becomes mayor.
  - City Cemetery established.
  - First sale of town lots.
- 1850
  - August: Squatters' Riot.
  - October–November: Cholera outbreak
  - November: Chevra Kaddisha Cemetery established, the first Jewish cemetery in the state
  - Population: 6,820.
  - Daily California Republican newspaper begins publication.
- 1852
  - Congregation B'nai Israel synagogue established.
  - Big Four Building constructed.
  - Fire.
- 1854 – State legislature relocates to Sacramento.
  - Sacramento Turn Verein founded
- 1855
  - First local steam railway of California opened.
  - November: the first California State Convention of Colored Citizens, a colored convention, was held here.
- 1856
  - Leland Stanford Mansion State Historic Park built.
  - December: the second California State Convention of Colored Citizens, a colored convention, held here
- 1857
  - Daily Bee newspaper begins publication.
  - Sacramento Library Association founded.
- 1860 – Ground broken for California State Capitol building.
- 1862 - Flood.
- 1863 – Central Pacific Railroad building across the Sierras begins.
- 1865 – California State Convention of Colored Citizens, a colored convention, was held here
- 1869 – First train from the Atlantic coast reaches Sacramento.
- 1874 – Capitol building completed.
- 1877 – Muybridge photographs galloping horse at Union Park Racetrack.
- 1879 – Sacramento Free Public Library founded.
- 1889 – Cathedral of the Blessed Sacrament built.
- 1890 – Population: 26,386.
- 1891 – Brighton School rebuilt.
- 1898 – Ruhstaller Building constructed.
- 1900 – Population: 29,282.

== 20th century ==
- 1909 - Old Sacramento Chinatown closed for railroad
- 1910 – Population: 44,696.
- 1912
  - Empress Theatre opens.
  - New Helvetia Cemetery closes for burials
- 1915 – Zoological park established.
- 1919 – Business and Professional Women's Club founded.
- 1923 – Sacramento Municipal Utility District established.
- 1924
  - Senator Hotel in business.
  - Chevra Kaddisha Cemetery closes
  - Home of Peace Cemetery opens
- Turn Verein Hall on J street opens
- 1927
  - Westminster Presbyterian Church built.
  - William Land Park Zoo opens.
- 1931 – Blue Anchor Building constructed.
- 1933 – Federal Building constructed.
- 1935
  - Tower Bridge opens.
  - McClellan Air Force Base established near city.

1937 - Sacramento Sheriff's Posse organized.

- 1937 – Sacramento Movie Forum organized.
- 1939 – Sacred Heart Parish School constructed.
- 1941 – Sacramento Army Depot activated.

1942 - Sacramento Horsemen's Association organized.

- 1947
  - Sacramento Opera Guild founded.
  - Vic's Ice Cream in business.
- 1948
  - Sacramento Symphony formed.
  - Belle Cooledge elected mayor.
- 1954 – Sacramento Ballet founded.
- 1955 – KCRA-TV begins broadcasting.
- 1956 – Sacramento Youth Symphony founded.
- 1957 – Arden Fair Mall in business.
- 1959 - KVIE-TV begins broadcasting.
- 1960 – Tower Records in business.
- 1961
  - Sacramento Peace Center established.
  - Sacramento Book Collectors Club active.
- 1962 – The Sacramento Observer newspaper begins publication.
- 1966 – From March to April, farmworkers march to Sacramento from Delano.
- 1968 – Sacramento Traditional Jazz Society formed.
- 1974 – Sacramento Dixieland Jubilee first held.
- 1975
  - Phil Isenberg becomes mayor.
  - September 5: Gerald Ford assassination attempt.
- 1977 – Sacramento Metropolitan Arts Commission established.
- 1979
  - November 28: Anti-nuclear sit-in at State Capitol.
  - Local Government Commission headquartered in city.
- 1982 – California State Capitol building restored.
- 1983 – Anne Rudin becomes mayor.
- 1985
  - Sacramento Kings basketball team active.
  - Sacramento History Center established.
- 1989 – Renaissance Tower built.
- 1990 – Population: 369,365.
- 1991
  - April 4: 1991 Sacramento hostage crisis.
  - U.S. Bank Plaza built.
- 1992 – Wells Fargo Center built.
- 1993 – Joe Serna, Jr. becomes mayor.
- 1995
  - City website online.
  - Sacramento Festival of Cinema begins.
- 1996 – Thistle Dew Dessert Theatre founded.
- 1997 – Sacramento Philharmonic Orchestra established.
- 1998 – Al-Arqam Islamic School established.
- 1999 – Robert T. Matsui United States Courthouse and Esquire Tower built.
- 2000
  - Sacramento Film and Music Festival begins.
  - Heather Fargo becomes mayor.

== 21st century ==
- 2008
  - Kevin Johnson becomes mayor.
  - Sacramento Press and Natomas Buzz begin publication.
  - U.S. Bank Tower built.
- 2009 – Bank of the West Tower built.
- 2010 – Population: 466,488.
- 2014 – Golden 1 Center breaks ground as the new home of the Sacramento Kings and opens in 2016.
- 2016 – Darrell Steinberg becomes mayor.
- 2022 – A mass shooting occurs in downtown Sacramento, killing six and injuring twelve.

== See also ==
- History of Sacramento, California
- List of mayors of Sacramento, California
- California Historical Landmarks in Sacramento County, California
- National Register of Historic Places listings in Sacramento County, California
- Timelines of other cities in the Northern California area of California: Fresno, Mountain View, Oakland, San Francisco, San Jose

== Bibliography ==
- Bogardus' San Francisco, Sacramento City and Marysville Business Directory. 1850.
- Winfield J. Davis (1890), "Sacramento City", An illustrated history of Sacramento County, California, Chicago: Lewis Pub. Co.
- Sacramento City and County Directory. Sacramento: Sacramento Directory Co. 1908.
  - 1919 ed.
- "Sacramento" . Encyclopædia Britannica. Vol. 23 (11th ed.). 1910. pp. 979–980.
- Federal Writers' Project (1939), "Sacramento", California: Guide to the Golden State, American Guide Series, New York: Hastings House
- Ory Mazar Nergal, ed. (1980), "Sacramento, CA", Encyclopedia of American Cities, New York: E.P. Dutton, OL 4120668M
- "Northern Interior: Sacramento", California, Let's Go, New York: St. Martin's Press, 1998, OL 10387102M
