= List of tallest buildings in Sacramento =

Skyline of Sacramento
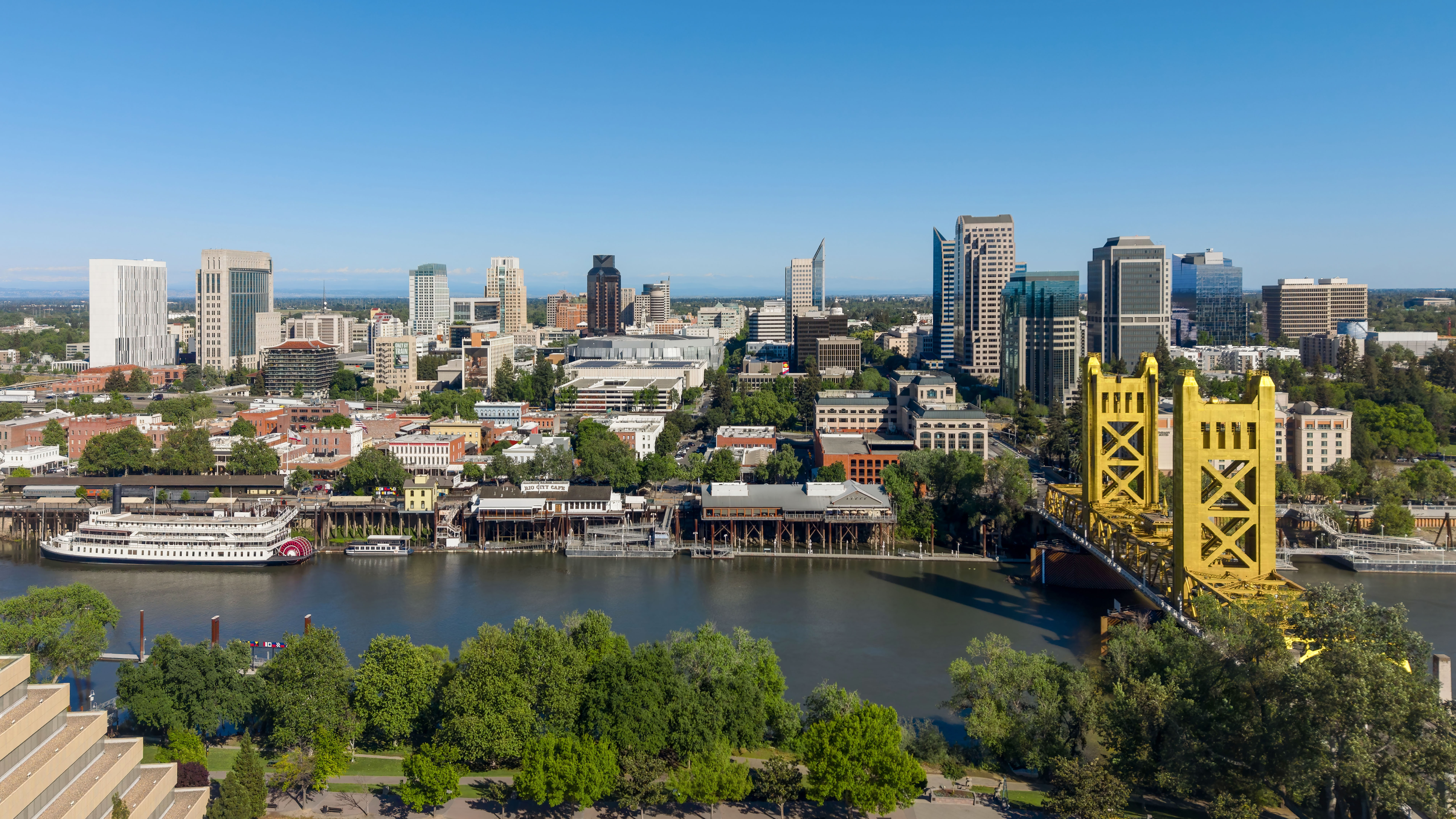
- Sacramento skyline on the Sacramento River with the Tower Bridge in 2026
- Tallest building: Wells Fargo Center (1992)
- Tallest building height: 423 ft (128.9 m)

Number of tall buildings (2026)
- Taller than 100 m (328 ft): 10

Number of tall buildings — feet
- Taller than 200 ft (61.0 m): 23
- Taller than 300 ft (91.4 m): 12

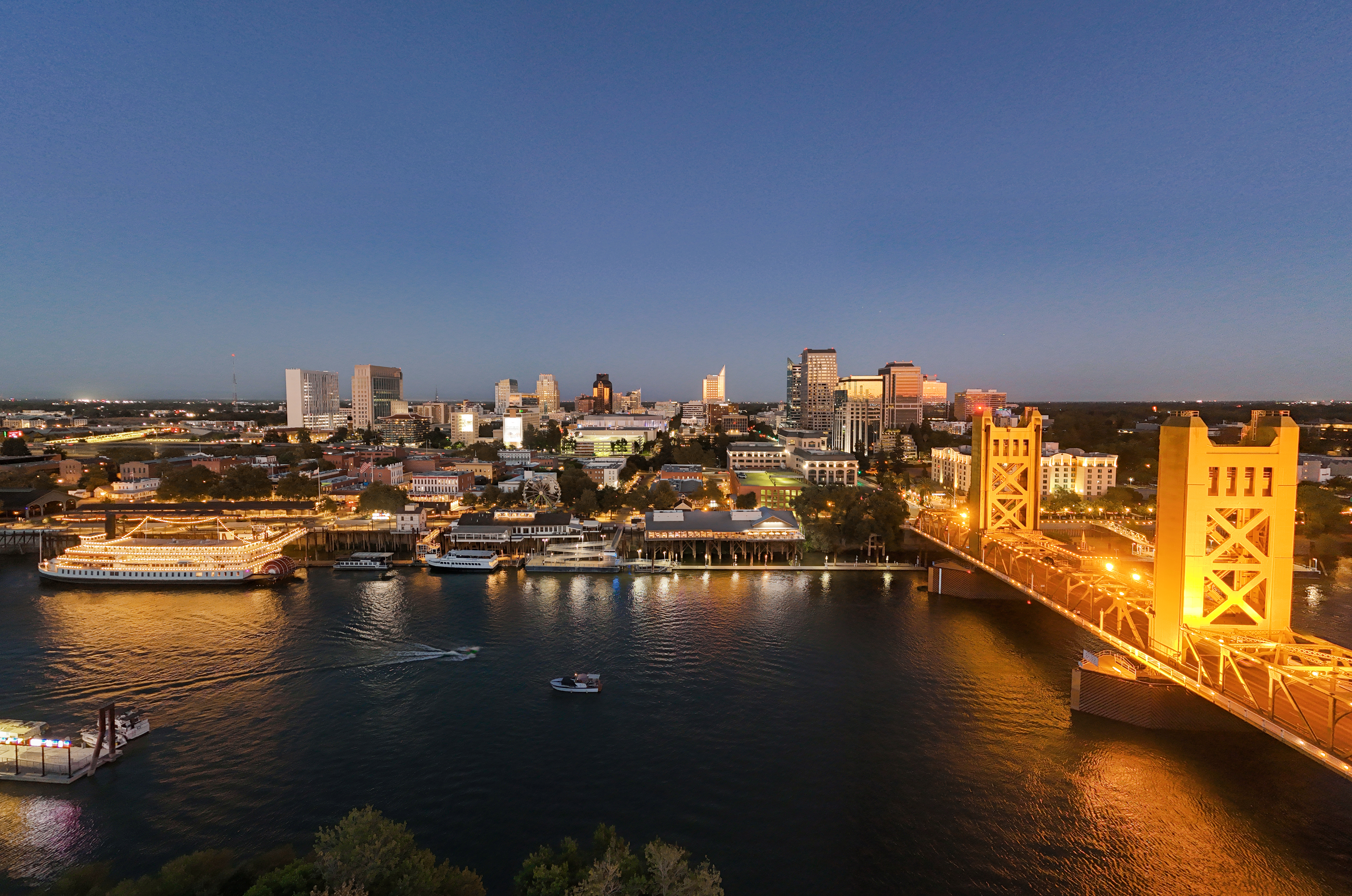
Sacramento at night, with the yellow Tower Bridge on the right

Sacramento is the capital of the U.S state of California, with a metropolitan area population of 2.4 million. Sacramento has the largest skyline in the Central Valley of California, and one of the largest in Northern California, with a total of 20 buildings that exceed 200 feet (61 m) in height, 13 of which are taller than 300 ft (91 m). Despite this, Sacramento has a relatively short and small skyline for its population; none of the skyscrapers in Sacramento are in the hundred tallest buildings in California. The tallest building in the city is the Wells Fargo Center, an 30-story office building completed in 1992 to a height of 423 ft (129 m).

As California's capital, many of Sacramento's tallest buildings serve as offices for government agencies, including the Cal/EPA Building for the California Environmental Protection Agency and the Natural Resources Tower for the California Natural Resources Agency, or as courthouse buildings, such as the Robert T. Matsui or Tani Cantil-Sakauye courthouses. The courthouses are next to each other. Residential high-rises are rare, and no fully residential buildings are taller than 200 feet (61 m). Almost all high-rises in the city are located in downtown, south of the American River and east of the Sacramento River. One notable tower, the CalSTRS building, sits across the Sacramento River in West Sacramento.

The history of skyscrapers in Sacramento began with the Citizen Hotel and the Elks Tower, both built in the 1920s. However, few high-rises were built in the city until the 1980s, avoiding the boom in office towers that took place in many major American cities in the previous decades. Sacramento tallest building remained the California State Capitol until the Renaissance Tower was built in 1989. Its title as the city's tallest building was quickly taken by Park Tower, and finally the Wells Fargo Center. Postmodernist architecture influenced the design of new skyscrapers during this period.

While construction slowed in the 2000s, the end of the decade would see the completion of Sacramento's second and third tallest building, the US Bank Tower and the Bank of the West Tower. Since 2010, the skyline has seen the addition of only three buildings taller than 200 ft (61 m). Two of them are the Natural Resources Tower and Tani Cantil-Sakauye courthouse. The other is the Kimpton Sawyer Hotel in 2017, part of the Downtown Commons project that also involved the construction of the Golden 1 Center, an indoor arena. Sacramento has received several proposals for taller residential and office towers. However, many former proposals, most notably the Towers on Capitol Mall, were cancelled due to the Great Recession and higher construction costs.

== History ==
Number of buildings by height in Sacramento by the end of each year, including the California Capitol Building, which was completed in 1874. Click on the legend to toggle a specific height on or off. View chart definition.

== Cityscape ==
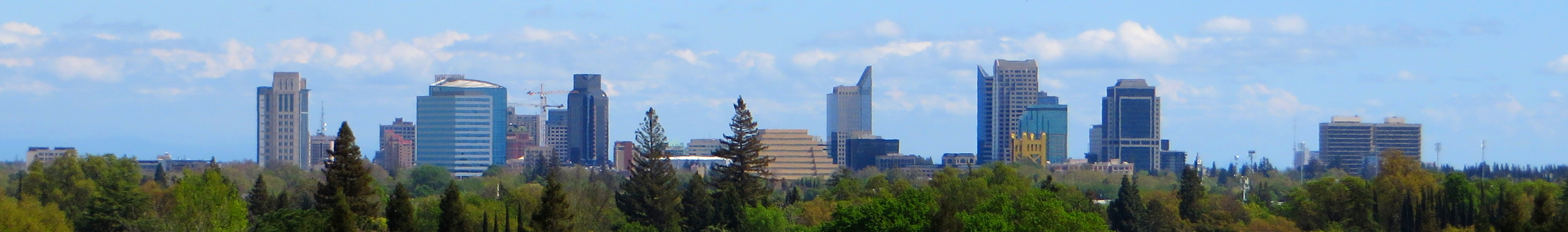
Downtown Sacramento from Interstate 80 in 2016

== Map of tallest buildings ==
The map below shows the location of buildings taller than 200 feet (61 m) in Sacramento. Each marker is numbered by height and colored by the decade of the building's completion.

Buildings taller than 200 ft (61 m) in Sacramento
- 1950s and before
- 1960s
- 1970s
- 1980s
- 1990s
- 2000s
- 2010s
- 2020s
1 Wells Fargo Center
2 US Bank Tower
3 Bank of the West Tower
4 Park Tower
5 Renaissance Tower
6 Cal/EPA Building
7 Esquire Plaza
8 Capitol Square
9 Robert T. Matsui United States Courthouse
10 Natural Resources Tower
11 Sacramento Courthouse Building
12 Sheraton Grand Sacramento
13 1325 J Street
14 West America Bank
15 Kimpton Sawyer Sacramento
16 California State Office Building 8
17 California State Office Building 9
18 California State Capitol
19 DGS Resources Building
20 1201K Tower
21 Department of Justice Building
22 Elks Tower
23 The Citizen Hotel

== Tallest buildings ==
This list ranks completed buildings in Sacramento that stand at least 200 ft (61 ft) tall as of 2026, based on standard height measurement. This includes spires and architectural details but does not include antenna masts. The “Year” column indicates the year of completion. Buildings tied in height are sorted by year of completion with earlier buildings ranked first, and then alphabetically.

Was the tallest building in Sacramento upon completion

Rank	Name	Image	Location	Height ft (m)	Floors	Year	Purpose	Notes
1	Wells Fargo Center		38°34′42″N 121°30′09″W	423 (128.9)	30	1992	Office	Tallest building in Sacramento. Tallest building completed in Sacramento in the 1990s.
2	US Bank Tower		38°34′43″N 121°29′57″W	402 (122.6)	25	2008	Office	Topped out in 2007. Tallest building completed in Sacramento in the 2000s.
3	Bank of the West Tower		38°34′41″N 121°30′05″W	396 (120.7)	25	2009	Office	Also known as 500 Capital Mall.
4	Park Tower		38°34′52″N 121°29′42″W	380 (115.8)	26	1991	Office	Also known as US Bank Plaza
5	Renaissance Tower		38°34′48″N 121°29′46″W	372 (113.4)	28	1989	Office	Tallest building completed in Sacramento in the 1980s.
6	Cal/EPA Building		38°34′55″N 121°29′31″W	372 (113.4)	25	2000	Office	Also known more formally as the Joe Serna Junior California EPA Building.
7	Esquire Plaza		38°34′42″N 121°29′23″W	355 (108.2)	22	1999	Office	
8	Capitol Square		38°34′39″N 121°30′09″W	351 (107)	25	1992	Office	
9	Robert T. Matsui United States Courthouse		38°35′01″N 121°29′55″W	350 (106.7)	16	1998	Office	
10	Natural Resources Tower		38°34′30″N 121°29′59″W	344 (105) (Note: Height is an estimate according to the source.)	22	2021	Office	A 344-foot, 877,000 sq ft skyscraper for the California Natural Resources Agency for up to 4200 employees. Also known as the "P Street Building". Tallest building built in Sacramento during the 2020s.
11	Sacramento Courthouse Building		38°35′04″N 121°29′54″W	325 (99)	18	2023	Government	Also known as the Tani Cantil-Sakauye Sacramento County Courthouse
12	Sheraton Grand Sacramento	–	38°34′45″N 121°29′24″W	318 (97)	28	2001	Hotel	Tallest hotel in Sacramento.
13	1325 J Street	–	38°34′45″N 121°29′18″W	265 (80.8)	19	1999	Office	Also known as the General Services Building.
14	West America Bank		38°34′43″N 121°30′14″W	264 (80) (Note: Sources do not state the exact height of this building. This figure was determined using Google Earth by subtracting the altitude of the building entrance from the highest architectural point.)	18	1984	Office	
15	Kimpton Sawyer Sacramento	–	38°34′54″N 121°29′58″W	260 (79)	16	2017	Mixed-use	Part of Downtown Commons, a new mixed use development home of the Golden 1 Center for the Sacramento Kings. Mixed-use hotel and residential building. Tallest building completed in Sacramento during the 2010s.
16	California State Office Building 8		38°34′27″N 121°30′00″W	256 (78)	17	1969	Office	Tallest buildings completed in Sacramento in the 1960s. Also known as the Department of Health Services Building.
17	California State Office Building 9		38°34′25″N 121°29′59″W	256 (78)	17	1969	Office	Tallest buildings completed in Sacramento in the 1960s. Also known as the Department of Social Services Building.
18	California State Capitol		38°34′36″N 121°29′37″W	247 (75.3)	6	1874	Government	Tallest building completed in Sacramento during the 19th century.
19	DGS Resources Building	–	38°34′32″N 121°29′52″W	244 (74)	17	1964	Office	Located at 1416 9th Street. Was renovated between 2022 and 2025. Also known as State Resources Building. If the state capitol is excluded, this was the tallest building in Sacramento from 1964 to 1969.
20	1201K Tower		38°34′43″N 121°29′27″W	238 (72.5)	18	1992	Office	
21	Department of Justice Building	–	38°34′47″N 121°29′17″W	226 (69)	18	1995	Office	
22	Elks Tower		38°34′49″N 121°29′30″W	226 (68.9)	14	1926	Office	Tallest building completed in Sacramento in the 1920s.
23	The Citizen Hotel		38°34′49″N 121°29′38″W	216 (65.8)	15	1925	Hotel	Originally known as California Western State Life Insurance Building, or simply the Cal-West Building. Along with Elks Tower, one of the earliest tall buildings in Sacramento.

=== Sacramento metropolitan area ===
Sacramento metropolitan area
- Population: 2,463,127 (2024 estimate)
- Cities included: Sacramento, West Sacramento

Number of tall buildings (2026)
- Taller than 100 m (328 ft): 10

Number of tall buildings — feet
- Taller than 200 ft (61.0 m): 24
- Taller than 300 ft (91.4 m): 12

In addition to the high-rises in the city of Sacramento, there is one building taller than 200 ft (61 m) in the Sacramento metropolitan area.

Rank	Name	Image	City	Height ft (m)	Floors	Year	Purpose	Notes
1	CalSTRS Building		West Sacramento 38°35′06″N 121°30′33″W	277 (84.4)	15	2009	Office	Tallest building in West Sacramento.

== Tallest under construction or proposed ==
=== Under construction ===
The following table includes buildings under construction in Sacramento that are planned to be at least 200 ft (61 m) tall as of 2026, based on standard height measurement. The “Year” column indicates the expected year of completion. Buildings that are on hold are not included.

Name	Height ft (m)	Floors	Year	Notes
UC Davis California Tower	237 (72.2)	14	2030	Hospital tower for the University of California, Davis.

=== Proposed ===
This lists ranks proposed buildings in Sacramento that are planned to be taller than 200 ft (61 m) as of 2026. A dash “–“ indicates information about the building is unknown or has not been released.

Name	Height ft (m)	Floors	Year	Notes
301 Capitol Mall	560 (170)	33	–	Project delayed and undecided due to CALPERS and CIM backing out of the project. The land is currently up for sale for a new concept to emerge. At 557 feet, the previously approved plan, Tower 301, would have been the tallest building in Sacramento.
Sacramento Commons	417 (127)	26	2027	Phase One featuring 2 mid-rise buildings has been completed. The next phase is expected to start in 3 to 5 years. At buildout, the Sacramento Commons project will have up to 1470 units spaced out between two mid rises and three 26 story towers with the option for an on site hotel and residential mixed use.
Vanir Tower	400 (121.9)	26	–	Will includes a 250-key luxury hotel, 50 luxury condominiums, 100,000 square feet of office space, and ground-floor retail and restaurants. Currently on hold after the developer, Vanir Development Co., withdrew the original application on June 29, 2018, to work on the current concept.
Southwest Corner/Third Street and Capitol Mall	308 (94)	26	2026	The height is still unknown until the construction start. Also known as Lot X. Southern Land Company announced plans on October 19, 2021, to build Sacramento's first high-rise for rental apartments in the city next to the Crocker Art Museum, which was previously owned by the Sacramento Kings and purchased for $16,750,000. The mixed-use project is designed by Solomon Cordwell Buenz and will feature a 341,000-square-foot 26 story residential tower with 263 luxury apartments, a 7-story 450 car parking garage, a 200,000-square-foot 14 story mass timber residential tower with 154 apartments, and 11,000-square-feet of retail. There will also be 21 3-story townhomes on the property. In total, there will be 436 market rate apartments on site. Amenities will include an outdoor pool on the 18th floor, a sculptural garden at the tower's plaza, and private terraces and rooftop gardens.
Unnamed hotel	–	28	–	A new 28-story convention hotel adjacent to the SAFE Credit Union Convention Center. Overall, the hotel room will contain 330 hotel rooms, two floors of underground parking, four floors with 28 residential units, a 6,000 square-foot ballroom, almost 13,000 square feet of meeting rooms, and a skyline rooftop bar and restaurant. The developers hope to start construction in 2026.

== Timeline of tallest buildings ==
Name	Image	Years as tallest	Height ft (m)	Floors
California State Capitol		1874–1989	247 (75.3)	6
Renaissance Tower		1989–1991	372 (113.4)	28
Park Tower		1991–1992	380 (115.8)	26
Wells Fargo Center		1992–present	423 (128.9)	30
