= Towers on Capitol Mall =

Planned towers in Sacramento, California

The Towers on Capitol Mall I & II
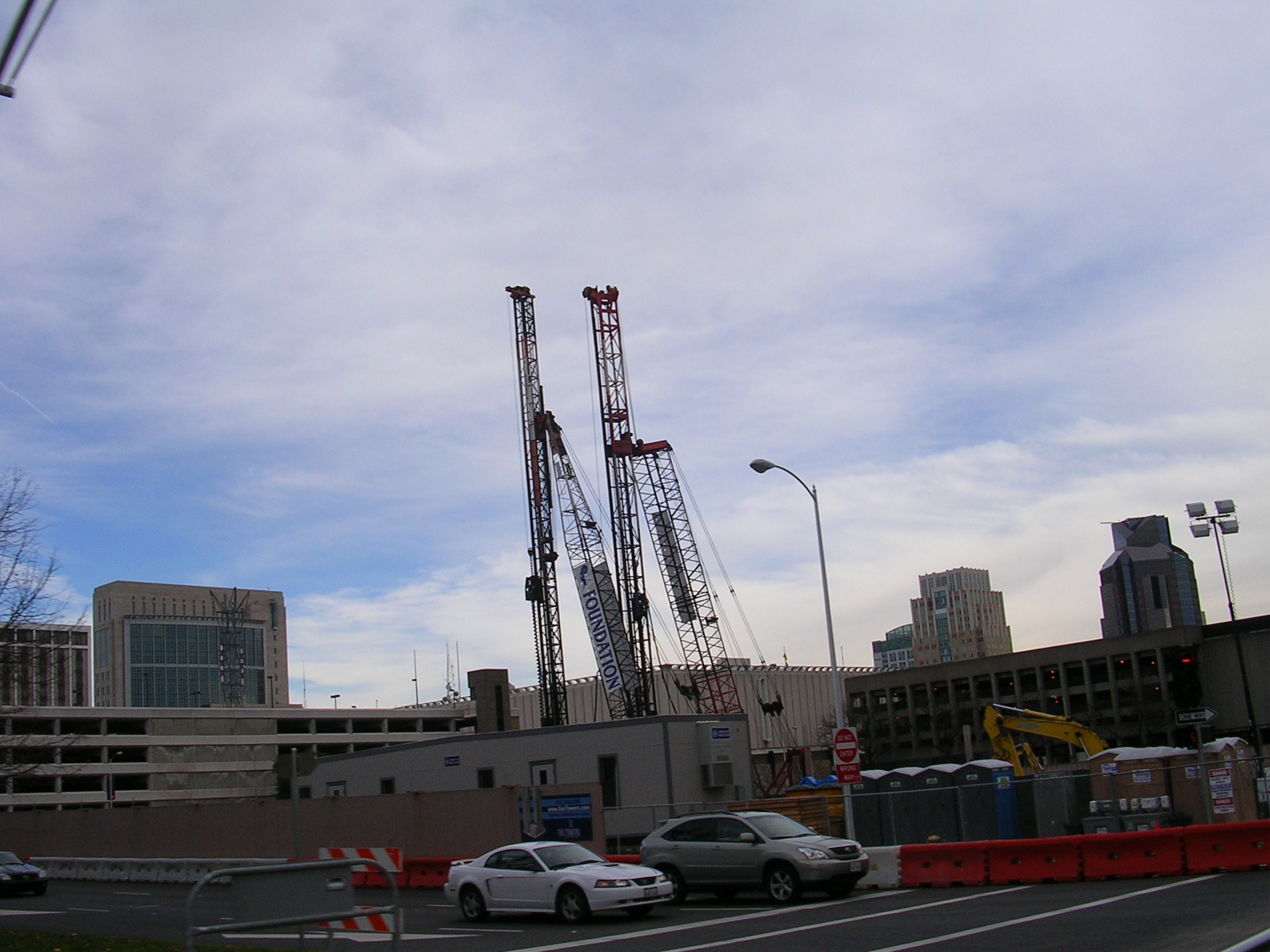
- The pile driving process when the building was under construction back in mid-December 2006.
- Interactive map of the The Towers on Capitol Mall I & II area

General information
- Status: Never built
- Location: Sacramento, California, United States
- Coordinates: 38°34′48″N 121°30′12″W
- Construction started: 2006
- Opening: Never

Height
- Roof: 615 ft (187 m)

Technical details
- Floor count: 53

Design and construction
- Architects: MulvannyG2 Architecture, Bellevue, Washington

The Towers on Capitol Mall were two 53-story, 615 foot (187 m) mixed-use towers to be built in downtown Sacramento, California. The buildings (The Towers on Capitol Mall I & II) were planned to have 804 condominia, a 200 room InterContinental Hotel, and ground floor retail. Rumoured retailers include Gucci, Prada, Kenneth Cole and Tiffany & Co. The Towers are notable due to the massive scope and scale of the building, and it would have easily surpassed the city's current tallest building, the 423 foot (129 m) Wells Fargo Center. The project had been on hold since January 7, 2007, due to liens being filed against developer John Saca, totaling $7.3 million. Calpers and Deutsche Bank have been the primary financial support for the project, however stipulating conditions have led to the collapse of the project. CalPERS is now teaming up with Los Angeles–based CIM to develop the downtown Sacramento block into a similar but smaller high-rise construction project consisting of a hotel, condominia and office space. The project would incorporate the original foundation piles that were driven into the bedrock in 2006 to support the weight of the 615-foot (187 m) skyscrapers.

== Location ==
The Towers would have been located at the address 301 Capitol Mall, a prominent location near the Tower Bridge and within a few blocks from the California State Capitol which at one time was home to the Sacramento Union newspaper.

== Project's Status ==
Currently, the project has ceased sales and construction, until picked up by CalPERS and CIM. The project's title/escrow firm, First American Title Company is in the process of returning all earnest deposits to the buyers. These deposits had been earning interest in a special money market-style account since early 2006.

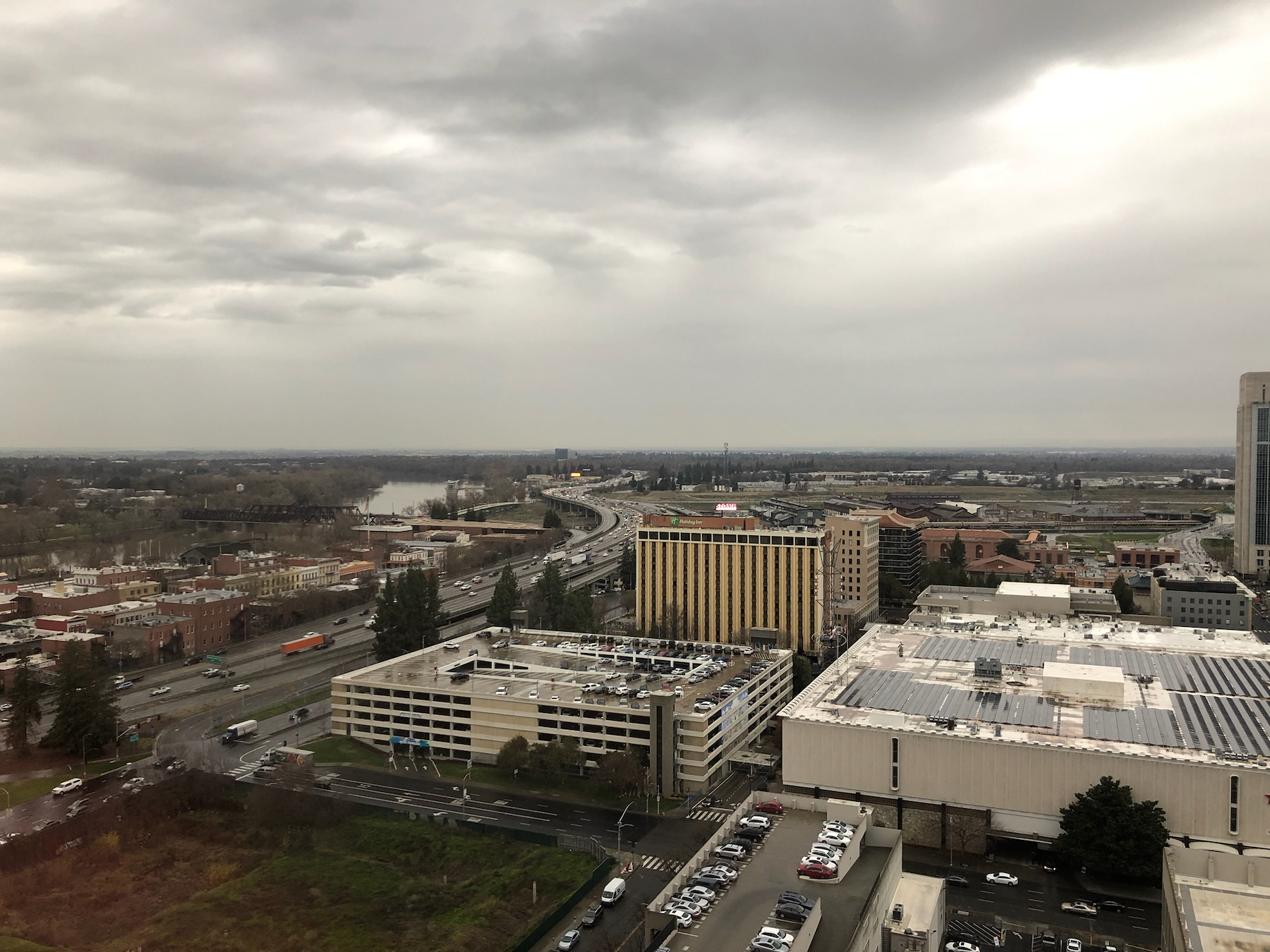
View from Wells Fargo Center of the stalled Towers on Capitol Mall development in lower left.

== See also ==
- List of tallest buildings in Sacramento
