= Bank of the West Tower =

Bank of the West Tower is the name of at least two buildings in the United States:

- Bank of the West Tower (Albuquerque) in Albuquerque, New Mexico
- Bank of the West Tower (Sacramento) in Sacramento, California
