= Sacramento History Museum =

Museum in Sacramento, California, United States of America

- Your Story Lives Here

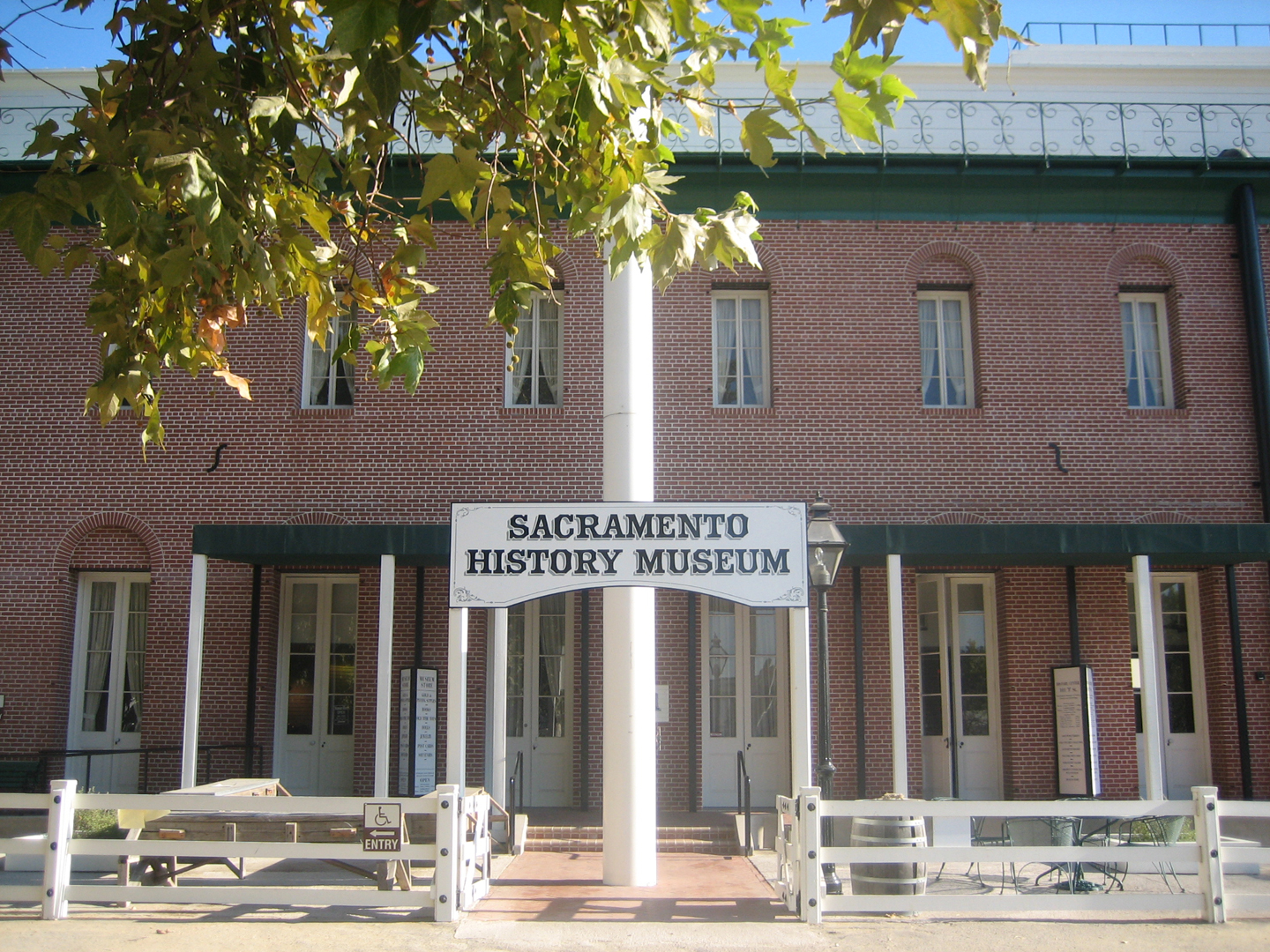
- Sacramento History Museum entrance
- Former name: Sacramento History Center; Discovery Museum Gold Rush History Center
- Established: 1985
- Location: 101 I Street, Sacramento, California, United States
- Coordinates: 38.58486°N 121.50499°W
- Type: Historical museum
- Website: sachistorymuseum.org

The Sacramento History Museum is a historical museum in Sacramento, California, which interprets the history of Sacramento and the California Gold Rush. The museum is located within the Old Sacramento State Historic Park, situated along the Sacramento River between the Tower Bridge and I Street Bridge.

== Museum history ==
The museum originally opened in 1985 as the Sacramento History Center, to exhibit artifacts and records from the Sacramento Archives and Museum Collection Center (now known as the Center for Sacramento History). In 1993, in a collaborative effort with the City of Sacramento, the Sacramento History Center and the Sacramento Science Center were combined under one entity, the Sacramento Museum of History, Science, and Technology. The Sacramento Museum of History, Science, and Technology operated two museum sites under the name "Discovery Museum." The Old Sacramento location remained dedicated to the history of Sacramento and the California Gold Rush, and was renamed the "Discovery Museum Gold Rush History Center."

In July 2008, under a directive from the City of Sacramento, the partnership between the History Center and the Science Center was dissolved. The museum's name was changed to the Sacramento History Museum, as did its leadership. The museum is jointly administered by the City and County of Sacramento and the Sacramento History Alliance, a non-profit organization dedicated to preserving Sacramento's history.

== Museum building ==
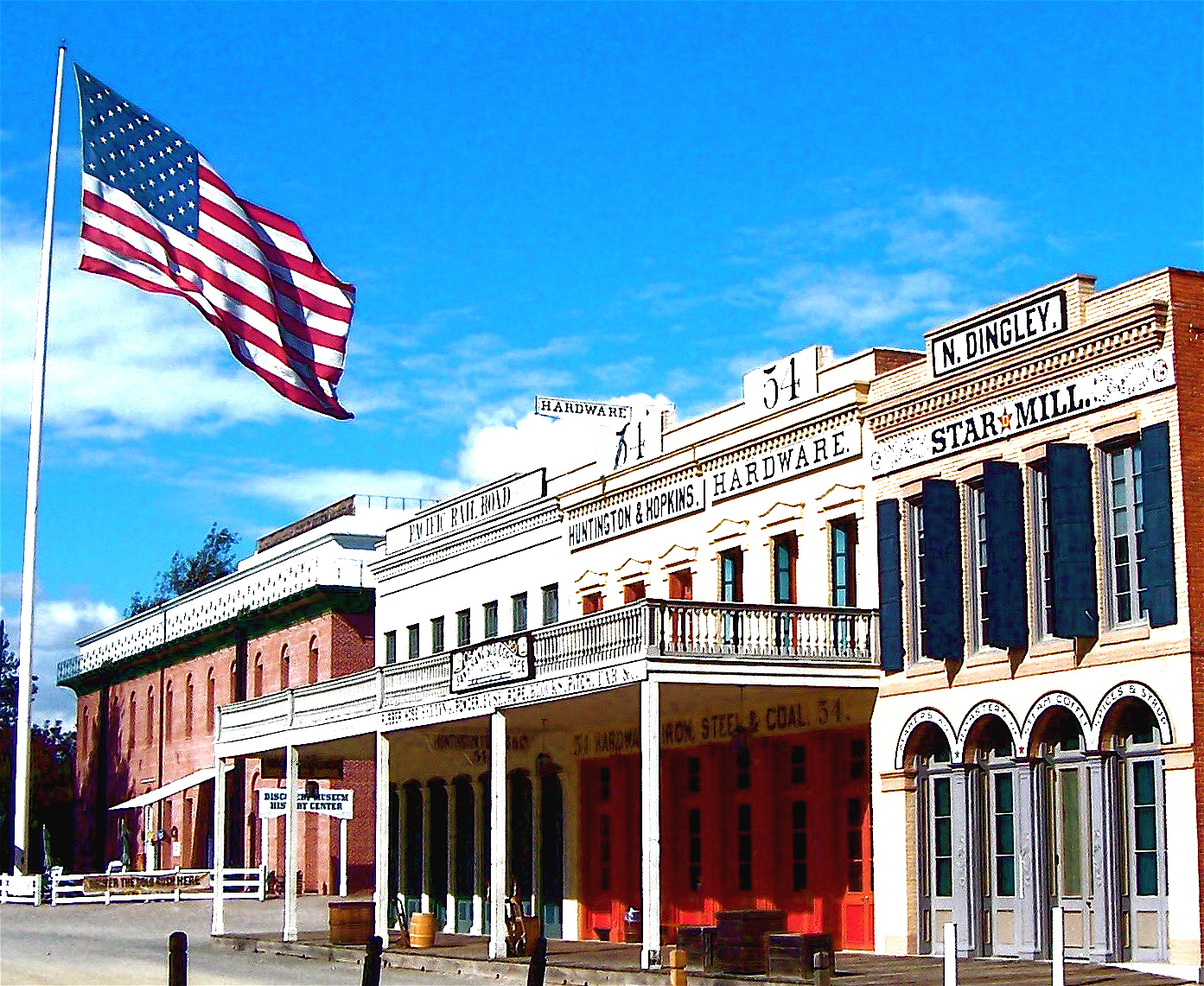
The Sacramento History Museum (left) with the Big Four Building (foreground)

The museum building is a reproduction of Sacramento's 1854 City Hall and Waterworks building, showcased in natural brick with two stories of 14-foot double doors across the front. The museum features 7,000 square feet of display space, including a historic print shop.

The original city hall was Sacramento's first municipal building. Construction on the original building began in 1853 and it was completed at a cost of $120,000 (roughly $4.8 million in 2024). It included many governmental offices, including the mayor's office, city jail, receiving hospital, and a court. City offices occupied the original structure until 1909, when they moved to an interim space before moving to the new permanent city hall in 1915.

The original building was demolished in 1913, with only a small portion of the jail surviving.

== Exhibits ==
Exhibit themes include the Gold Rush and mining, Nisenan & Maidu Indian Nations, fur trapping, agriculture, and cultural heritage. Artifacts displayed in the building are often from the collection of the Center for Sacramento History, the City of Sacramento's repository for archives and museum objects.

=== Print Shop ===
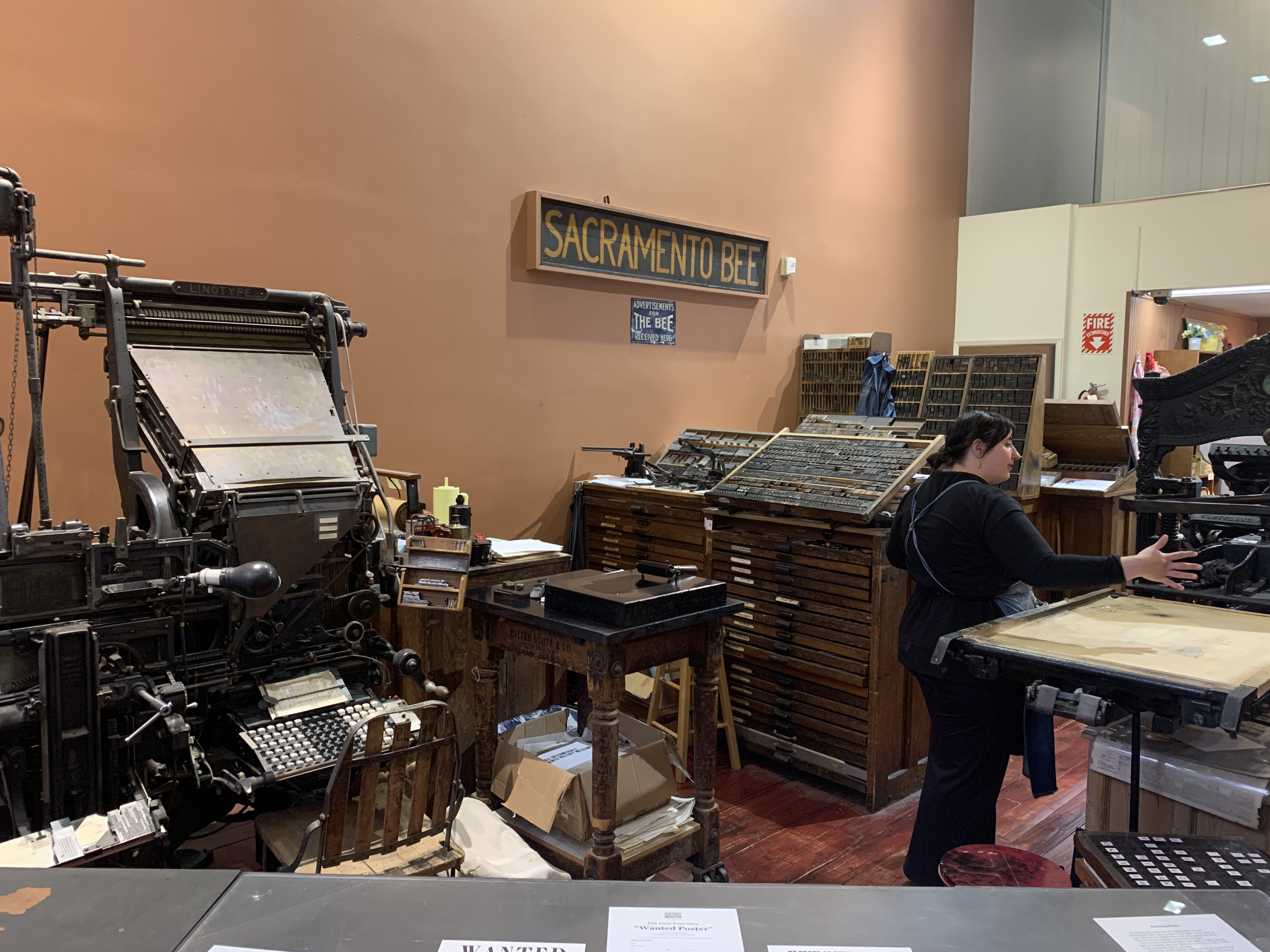
The Sacramento History Museum's historic print shop

The museum features a working print shop, with historic printing presses that are still operational. In 2020, the museum closed due to the COVID-19 pandemic. As a way to maintain engagement, the museum set up a social media account on TikTok. Videos featuring volunteer Howard Hatch demonstrating how to use the printing presses became viral on social media. As of June 2024, the Sacramento History Museum's YouTube channel has over 3.24 million followers, making it the most subscribed-to museum on the website, and has garnered over one billion views. The museum's TikTok account also has over 2.7 million followers.

== Programs ==
The Sacramento History Alliance and the Sacramento History Museum also conduct tours of Old Sacramento. These tours include a tour of the "Old Sacramento Underground," showing how the city was raised after flooding had destroyed many buildings in the 1860s and 1870s.

== See also ==
- History of Sacramento, California
- Timeline of Sacramento, California
