= Elks Tower =

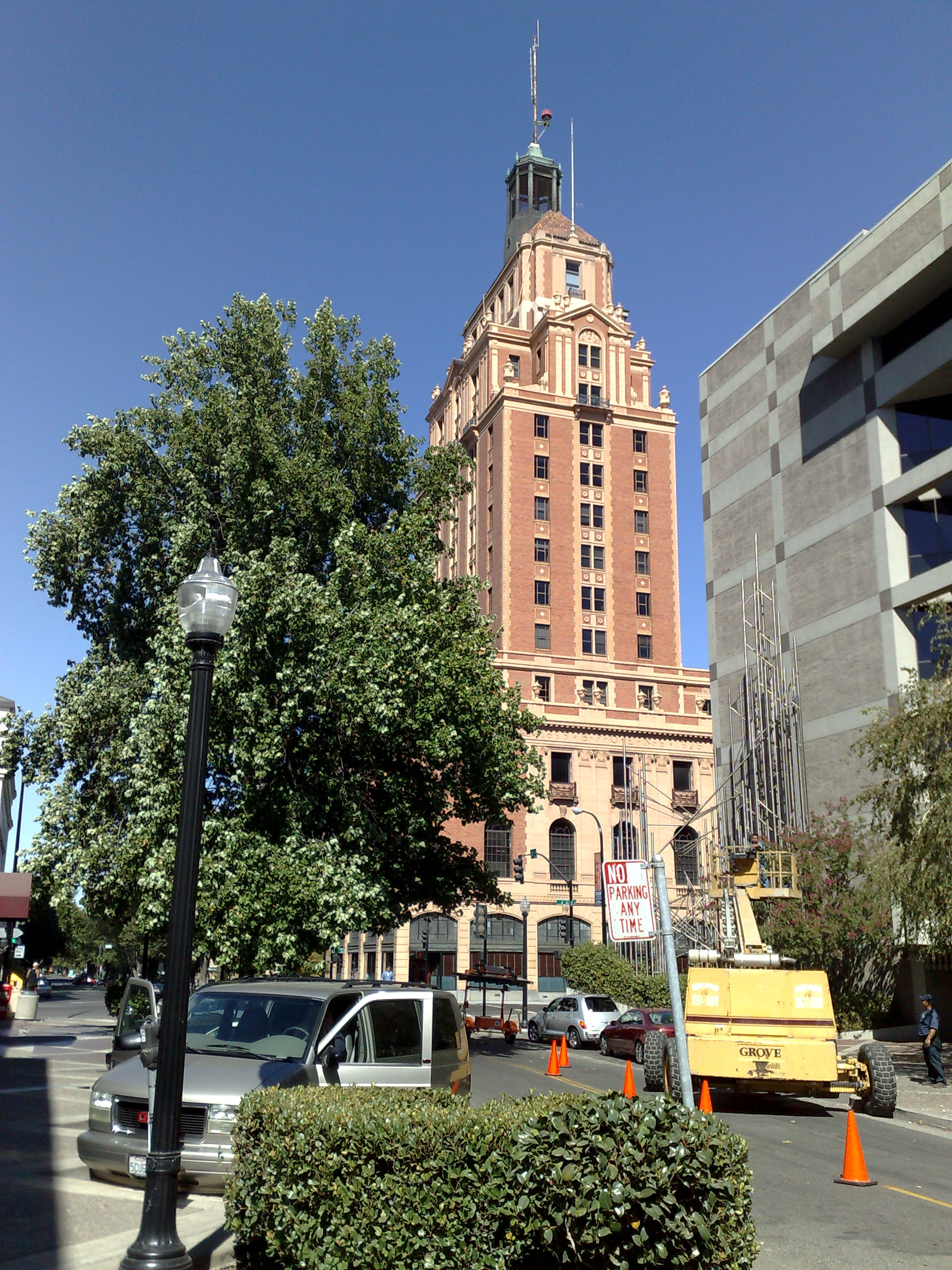
- Elks Tower from 11th Street, 2007

- Location within California
- 38°34′48″N 121°29′29″W
- Location: Sacramento, California

History
- Built: 1926

Site notes
- Architect: Leonard J. Starks
- Architectural style: Italian Renaissance

Elks Tower is an Italian Renaissance building located at 921 11th Street in Sacramento, California. It stands fourteen stories tall, and is the former home to the transmitting tower for the KRXQ. At the time of its construction, it not only was a home for the Elks, it also had approximately 100 hotel rooms and a storefront.

== History ==
=== Early history ===
This led to the construction of a new, 226-foot-tall Elks Temple, built out of brick and steel, located at the northeast corner of 11th and J Street. It was dedicated as the home of Sacramento Elks Lodge No. 6 on June 22, 1926.

"I am not proud because we built higher, not proud because we built bigger, but proud because we have build a temple to Elkdome in the city of Sacramento, which already is becoming the topic of conversation wherever Elks congregate and which before long will be instrumental in placing the name of Sacramento on the lips of nearly every Elk throughout the nation." (sic)

— Walter Hicks

=== Late 1960s ===
In 1968, the thirteenth floor of the building became home to the newly created 98.5 FM radio station, today's KRXQ.

==== Amenities and configuration of the building during the late 1960s ====
Floor	Contents
Basement	steam room
Ground floor	exercise room
Second floor	ballroom & main dining room
Third floor	Lodge and reading room
Fourth floor	meeting room, billiards area, and game room

=== Current use ===
The Elks Tower is now a venue which can be booked for events, such as weddings and parties. In 2019, Steve Ayers, the current owner of the building at the time, requested a reconsideration of a gambling license for a cardroom at Elk's Tower; this was ultimately denied by the California Gambling Control Commission.

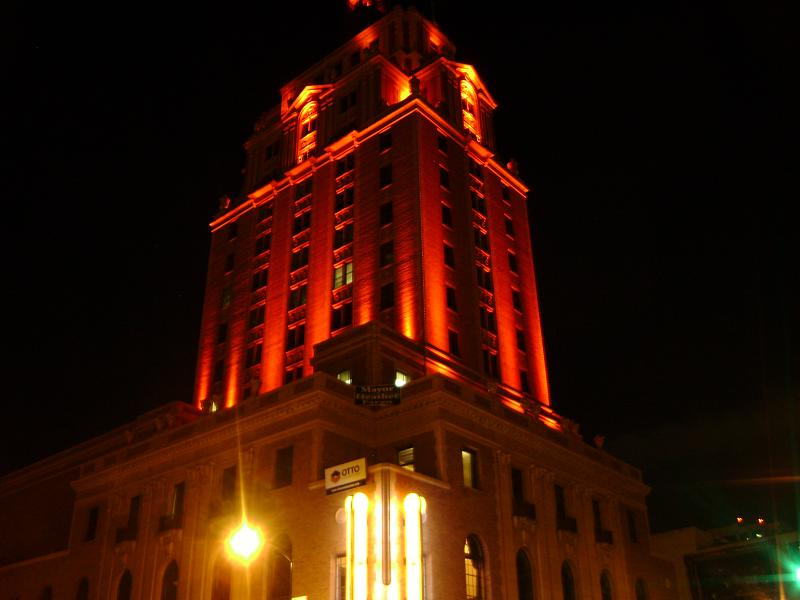
Elks Tower at night (2008)

== Radio station ==
The Elks Tower was the former home to the transmitting tower for 98.5 FM KZAP.

== See also ==
- List of Elks buildings
- List of tallest buildings in Sacramento
