= Cal/EPA Building =

- Cal/EPA Logo

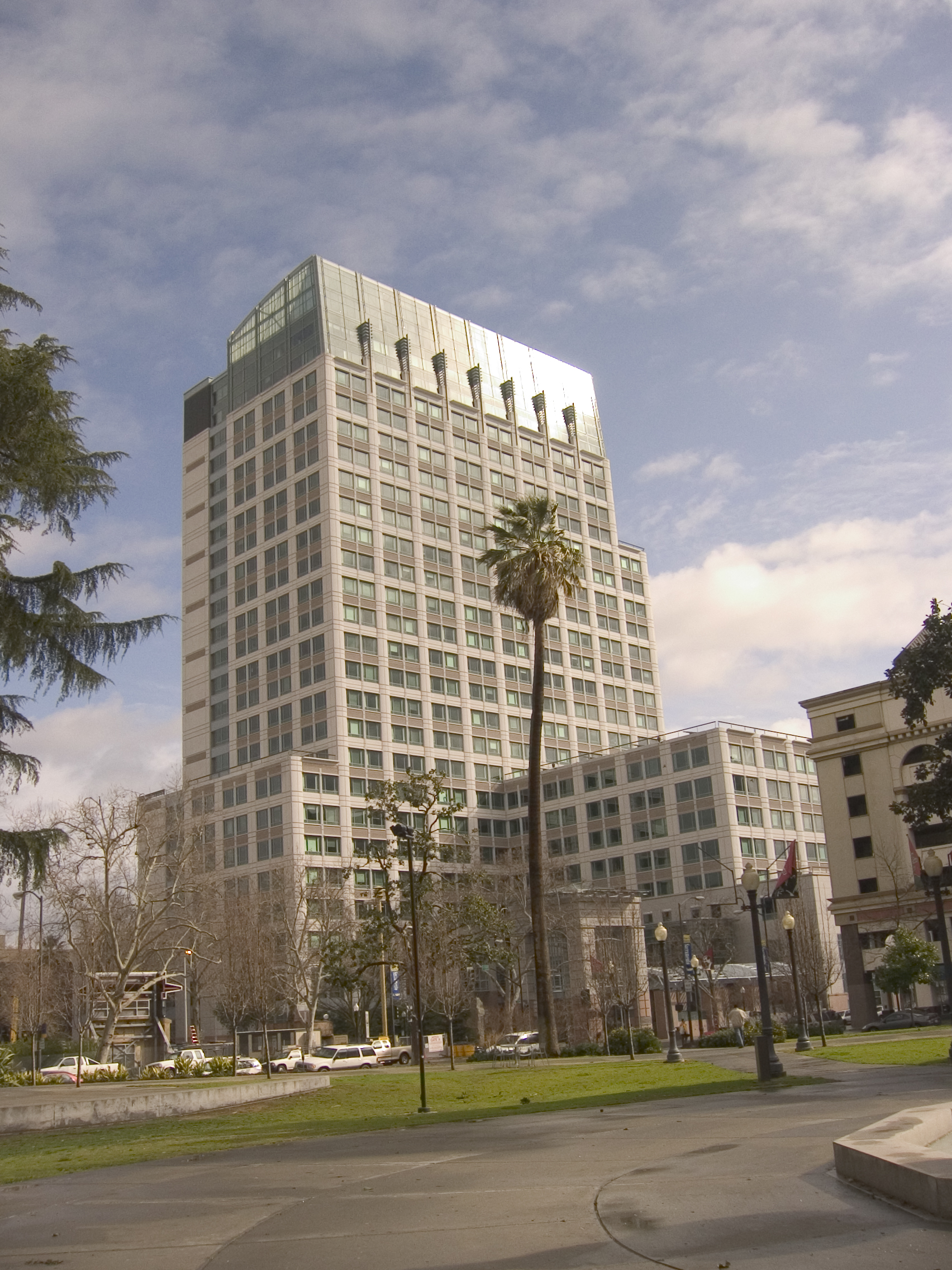
- Cal/EPA Building in 2004

- Location within Sacramento, California Location within California Location within the United States
- Alternative names: Joe Serna Jr. Building
- Etymology: California - Cal, Environmental Protection Agency - EPA

General information
- Status: Existing (completed)
- Type: Skyscraper
- Architectural style: Postmodernism
- Location: Sacramento, California, 1001 I St. Sacramento, CA 95812, United States
- Coordinates: 38°34′53″N 121°29′33″W
- Groundbreaking: 1998
- Completed: 2000
- Opened: 2000
- Cost: $172,868,000

Height
- Height: 372 ft (113 m)

Dimensions
- Other dimensions: Length: 340 ft, Width: 321 ft

Technical details
- Structural system: Steel
- Material: Granite
- Floor count: 25
- Floor area: 950,000 sq. ft
- Lifts/elevators: 17

Design and construction
- Architecture firm: AC Martin Partners, Inc.
- Awards: Best of 1999 Awards — Outstanding Engineering; Design-Build Institute of America 2002 Design-Build Excellence Award; American Public Works Association “Project of the Year”
- Known for: Headquarters of California Environmental Protection Agency

The Cal/EPA Building is a 25-floor, 372 ft commercial office skyscraper in Downtown Sacramento that serves as the headquarters for the California Environmental Protection Agency (Cal/EPA). It also known as the Joe Serna Jr. Building, named to honor the late mayor of Sacramento, Joe Serna Jr. Built in 2000, the building stands 372 feet tall and sits across the street from Cesar Chavez Plaza and Sacramento City Hall. It has a daily population of 3,500. It is recognized by the United States Environmental Protection Agency as one of the most energy-efficient high-rise office buildings in the United States, with a score of 96 out of 100. In 2003, it was recognized by Energy Star as the most energy-efficient high-rise in the nation. Solar panels are installed that generate electricity soundlessly for the building.

== See also ==
- California Environmental Protection Agency
- List of tallest buildings in Sacramento
