= Esquire Tower =

Office building in Sacramento, California

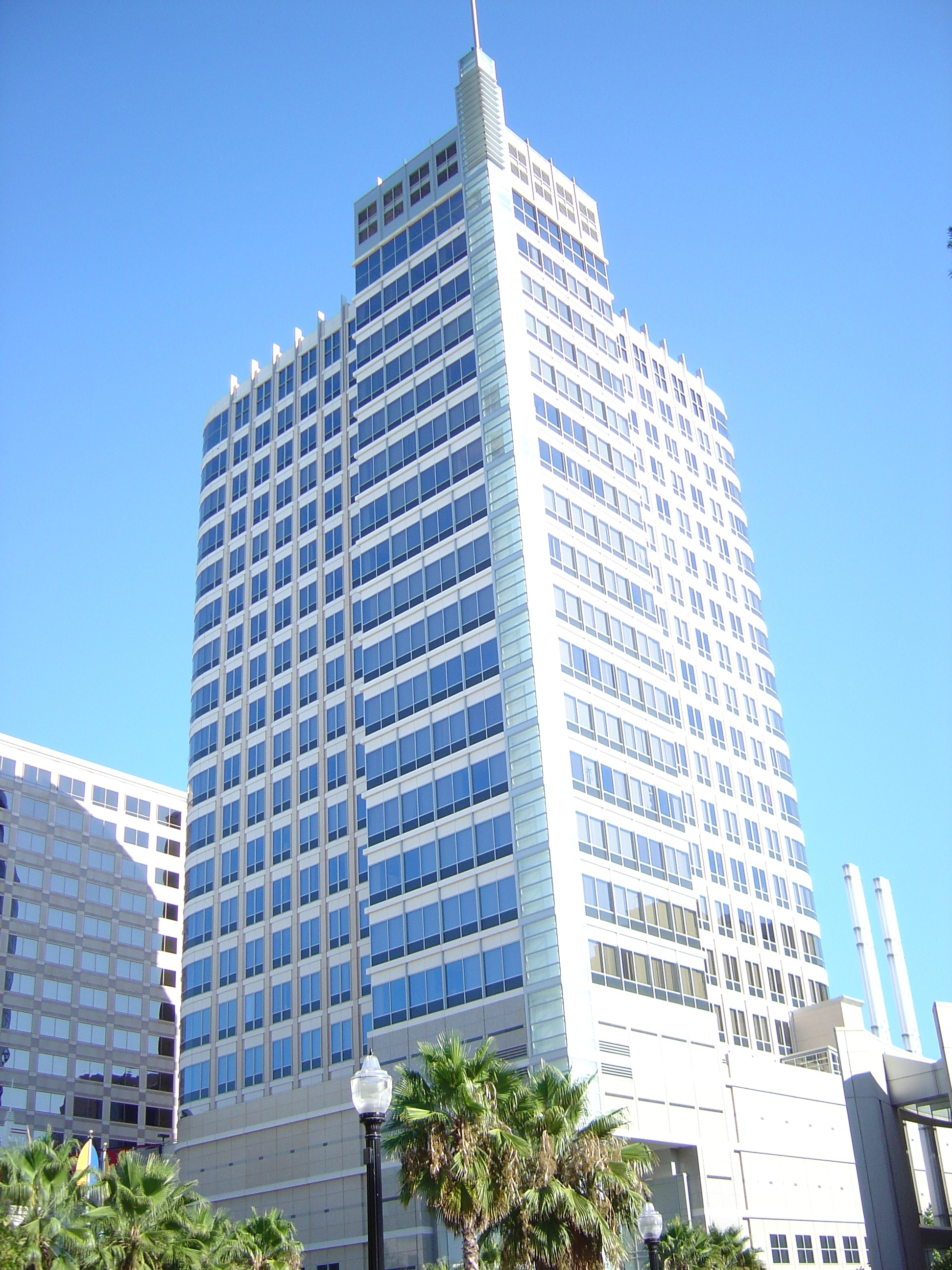

- Location within California Esquire Tower (the United States)

General information
- Status: Existing
- Location: Sacramento, California, United States
- Coordinates: 38°34′44″N 121°29′27″W
- Opening: 1999

Height
- Roof: 322 ft (98 m)

Technical details
- Floor count: 22
- Floor area: 248,416 sq ft (23,078.6 m^{2})

Design and construction
- Architect: HOK Architects
- Main contractor: Hensel Phelps

Esquire Tower, also known as Esquire Plaza, is a 322-foot (98 m) 248,816 square foot office building in downtown Sacramento, California. The Esquire IMAX Theater as well as a restaurant are located on the ground level of Esquire Plaza.

== Gallery ==
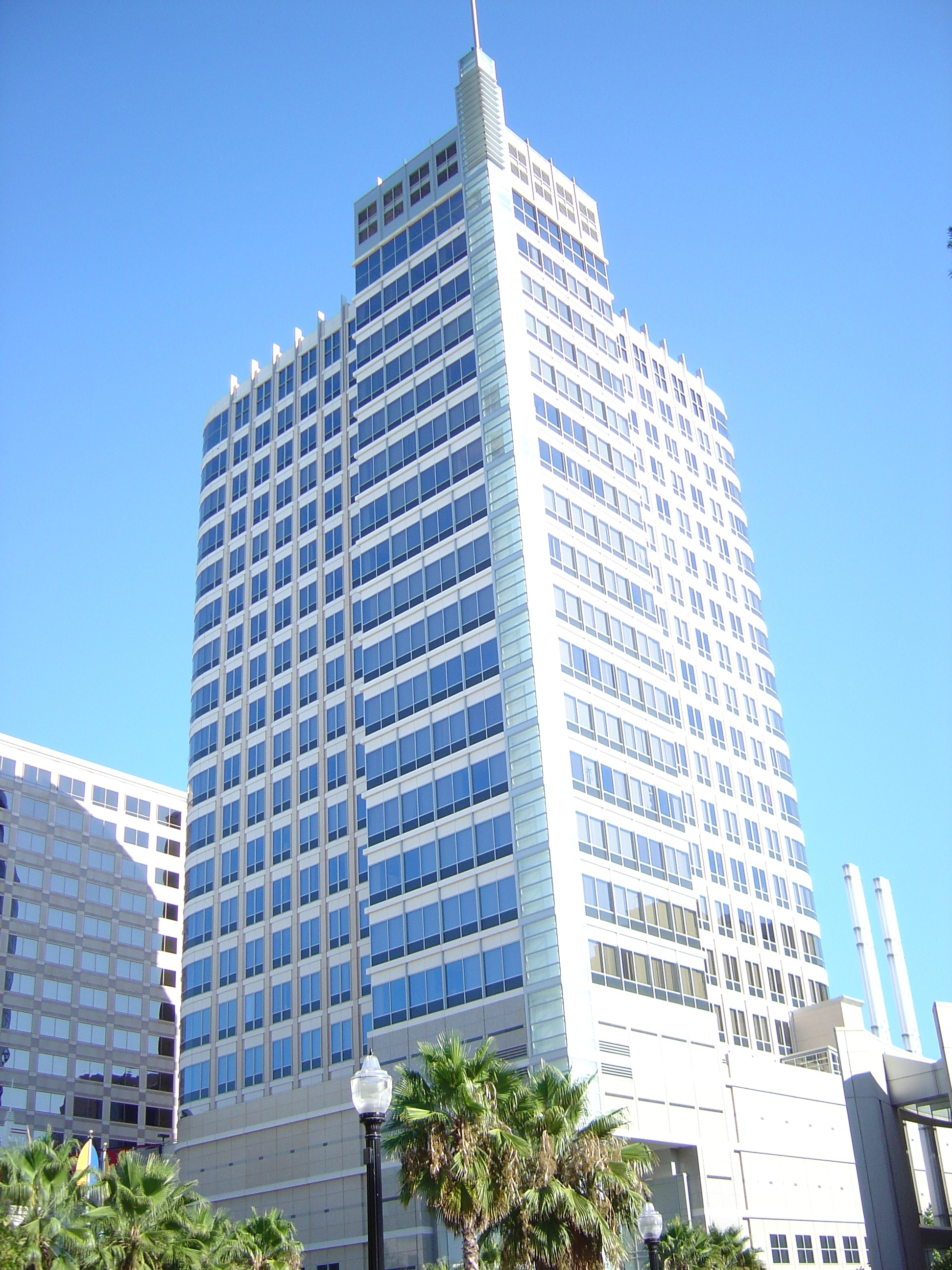

== See also ==
- List of tallest buildings in Sacramento
