= Thistle Dew Dessert Theatre =

Coordinates: 38.57056°N 121.48383°W

Thistle Dew Dessert Theatre, founded in 1996, is community theater in Sacramento, California. It claims to be the only American theater serving dessert with its theatrical productions. The theatre was established by playwright Thomas Kelly. The American Regional Theatre Association awarded the theatre a special citation for original work in 2009.

Jacob M. Appel's Thirds, which premiered at the theatre, won an Elly Award in 2011.
