= Park Tower (Sacramento) =

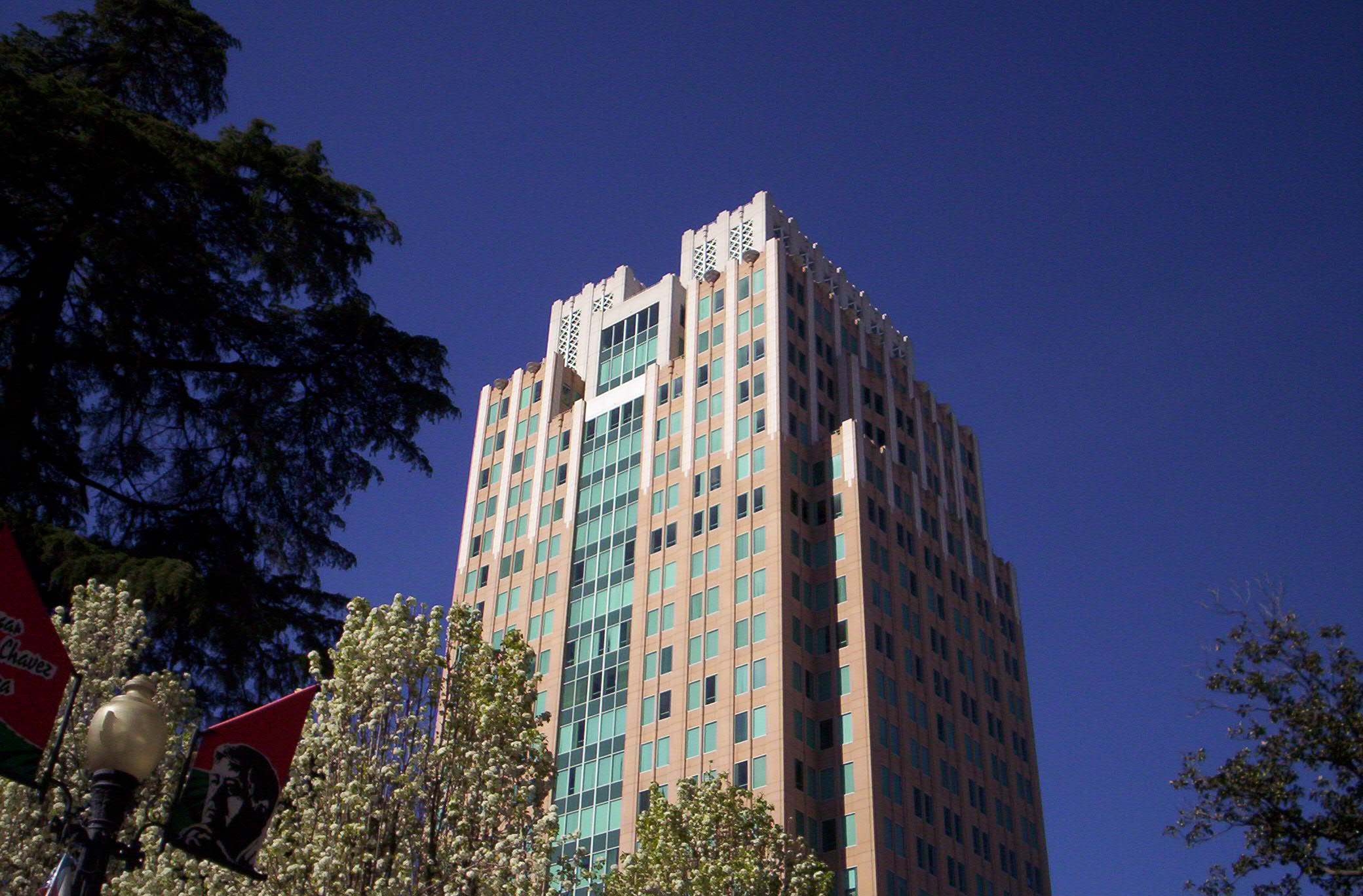

- Location within California Park Tower (Sacramento) (the United States)

General information
- Type: Commercial offices
- Location: 980 9th Street; Sacramento, California
- Coordinates: 38.5811°N 121.495°W
- Completed: 1991
- Owner: Hines

Height
- Roof: 380 ft (120 m)

Technical details
- Floor count: 26
- Floor area: 414,000 sq ft (38,500 m^{2})

Design and construction
- Architect: Kaplan McLaughlin Diaz
- Structural engineer: Buehler & Buehler Associates
- Main contractor: Turner Construction

Park Tower is a 380-foot (120 m) skyscraper in Sacramento, California, completed in 1991. The 26-story tower was the tallest in the city when completed. The building was named U.S. Bank Plaza until U.S. Bank moved to U.S. Bank Tower in 2008. Previously owned by the Shorenstein Company, the building was bought by Hines in 2017.

== Gallery ==
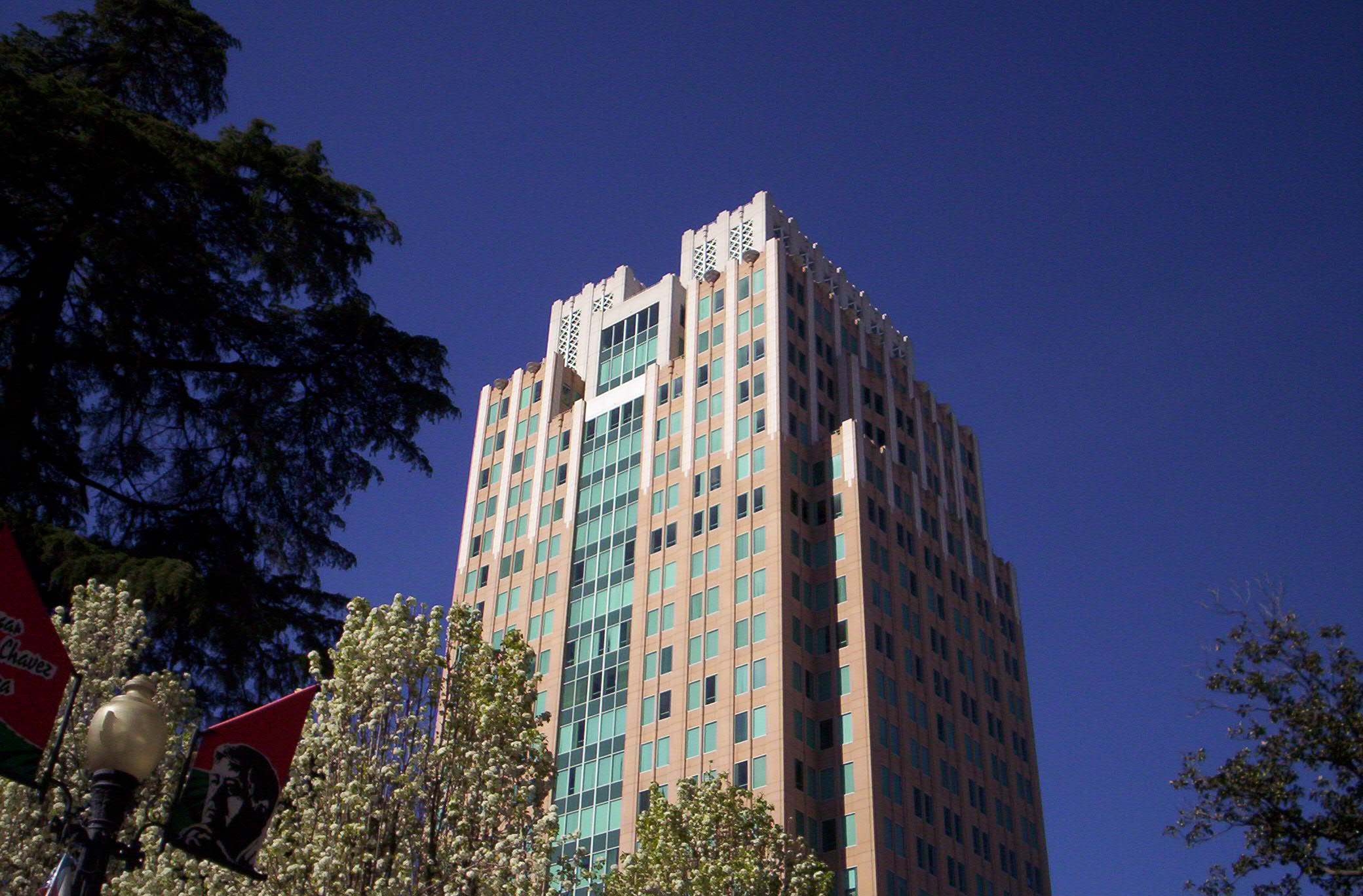
Park Tower viewed from Cesar E. Chavez Plaza

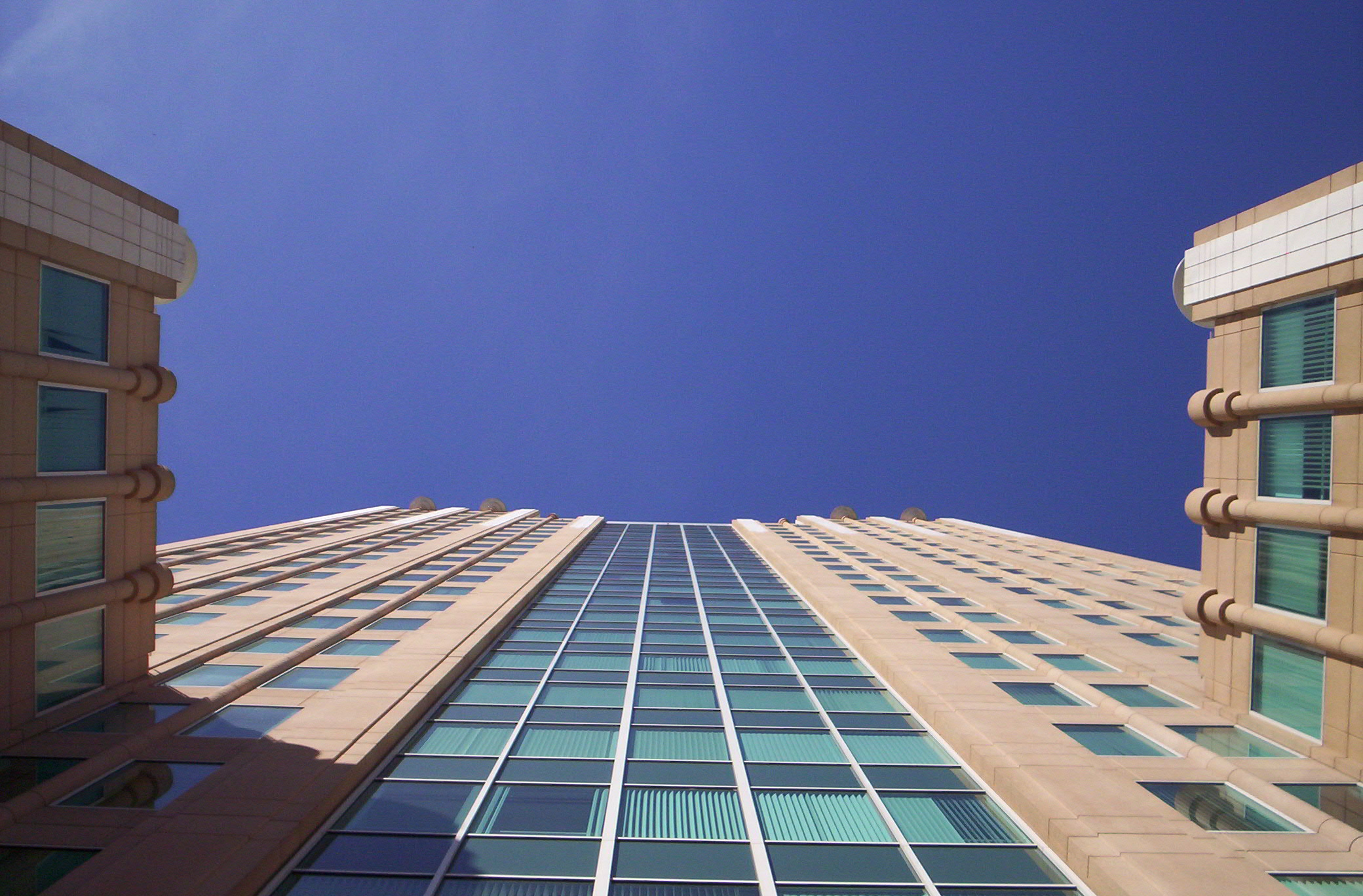
Viewed from ground level

== See also ==
- U.S. Bank Tower (Sacramento)
