= Renaissance Tower (Sacramento) =

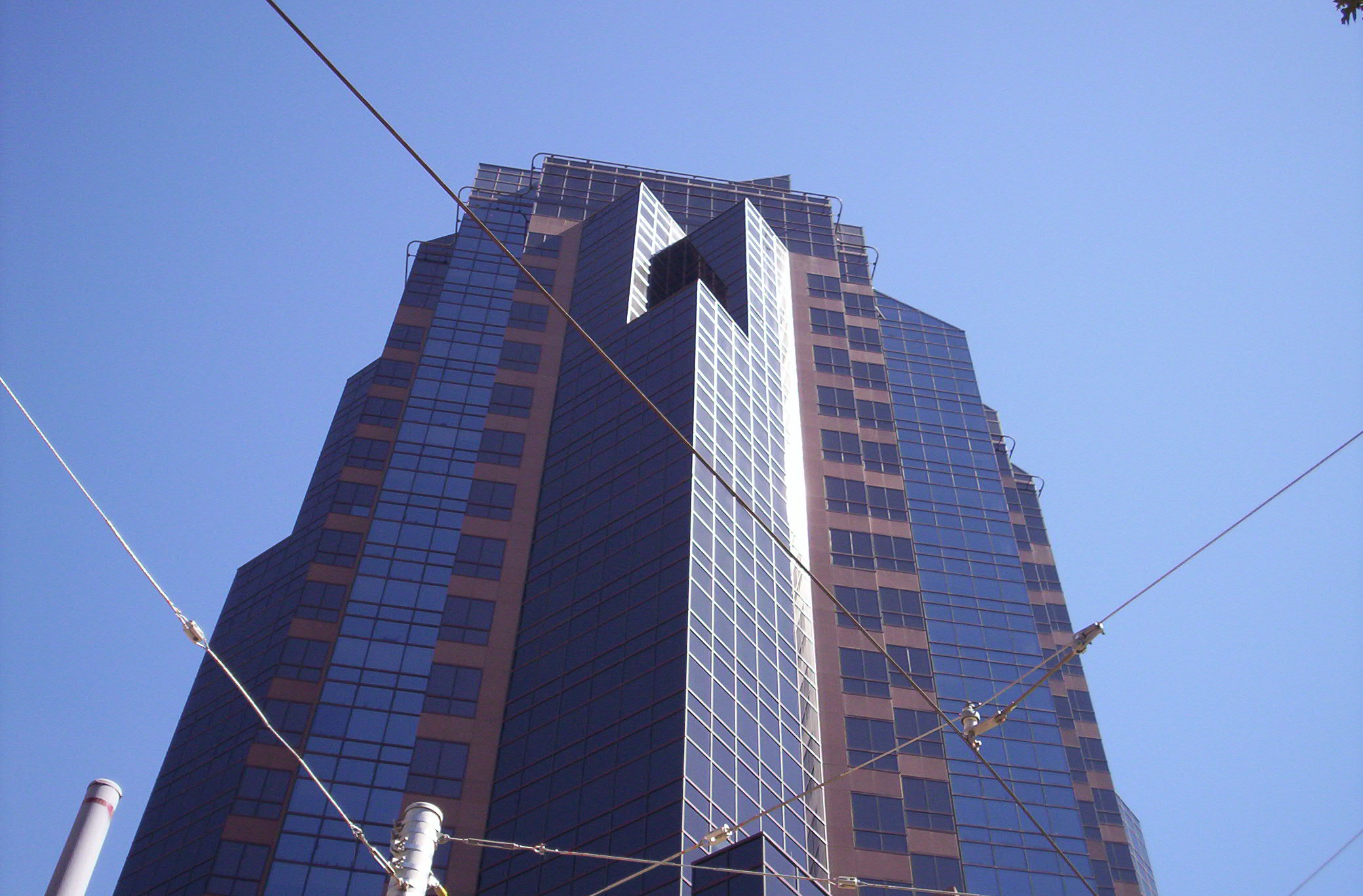

- Location within California Renaissance Tower (Sacramento) (the United States)

General information
- Type: Commercial offices
- Location: 801 K Street; Sacramento, California
- Coordinates: 38.580125°N 121.496158°W
- Completed: 1989
- Cost: US$45 million
- Owner: Ethan Conrad Properties
- Management: Ethan Conrad Properties

Height
- Roof: 113.39 m (372.0 ft)

Technical details
- Floor count: 28
- Floor area: 336,000 ft^{2} (31,200 m^{2})

Design and construction
- Architect: Daniel, Mann, Johnson & Mendenhall (DMJM)
- Structural engineer: Wallace-Kuhl & Associates
- Main contractor: Turner Construction

Renaissance Tower is a 113 m (371 ft) skyscraper in Sacramento, California, completed in 1989. The 28 story tower was the tallest in the city when completed, and is now the fifth. At one time owned by USAA Real Estate Company, the building was sold in January 2016 to GPT Properties Trust of Maryland, then finally won in an auction in October 2024 by Ethan Conrad Properties Inc.

Renaissance Tower
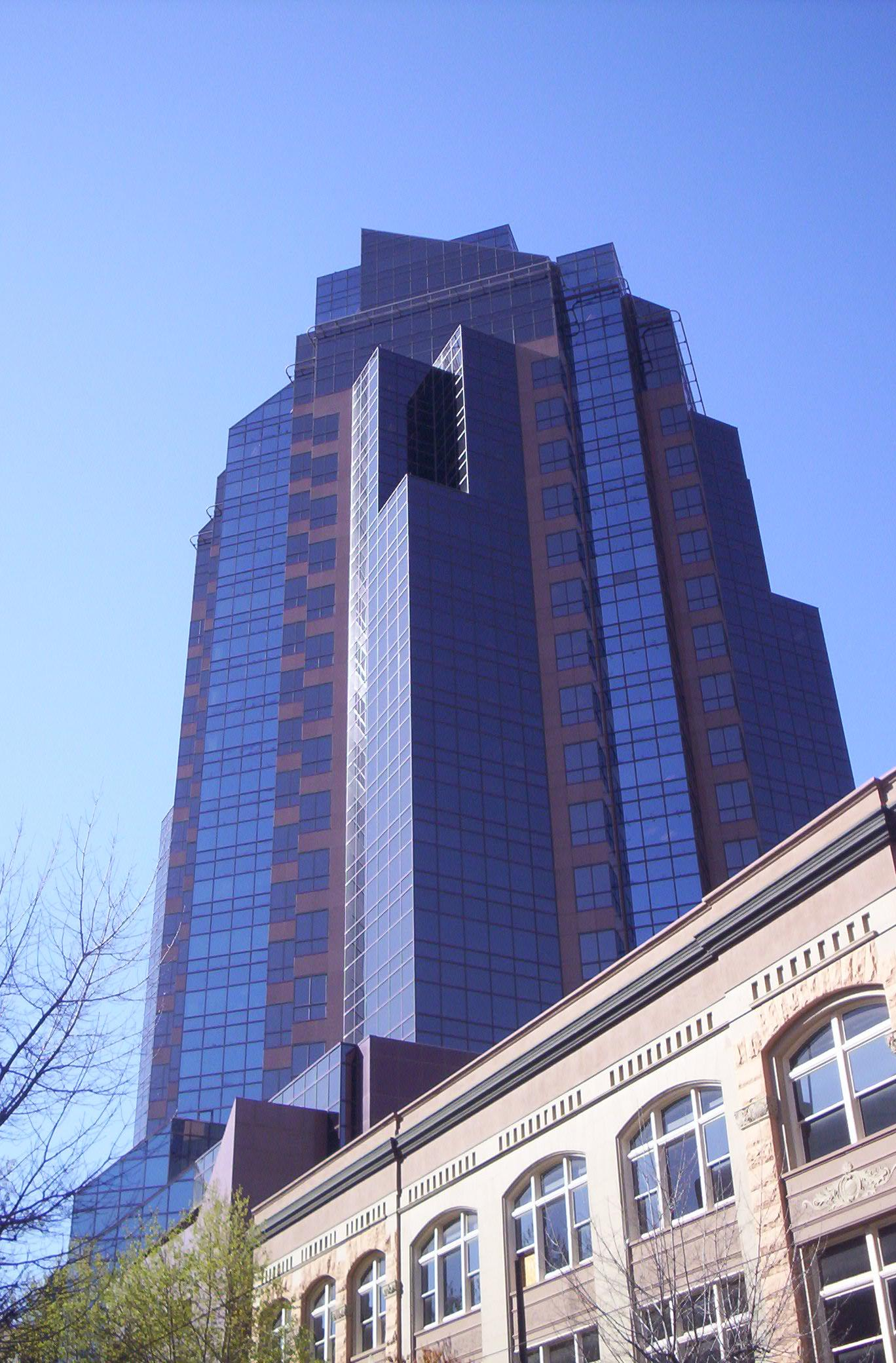

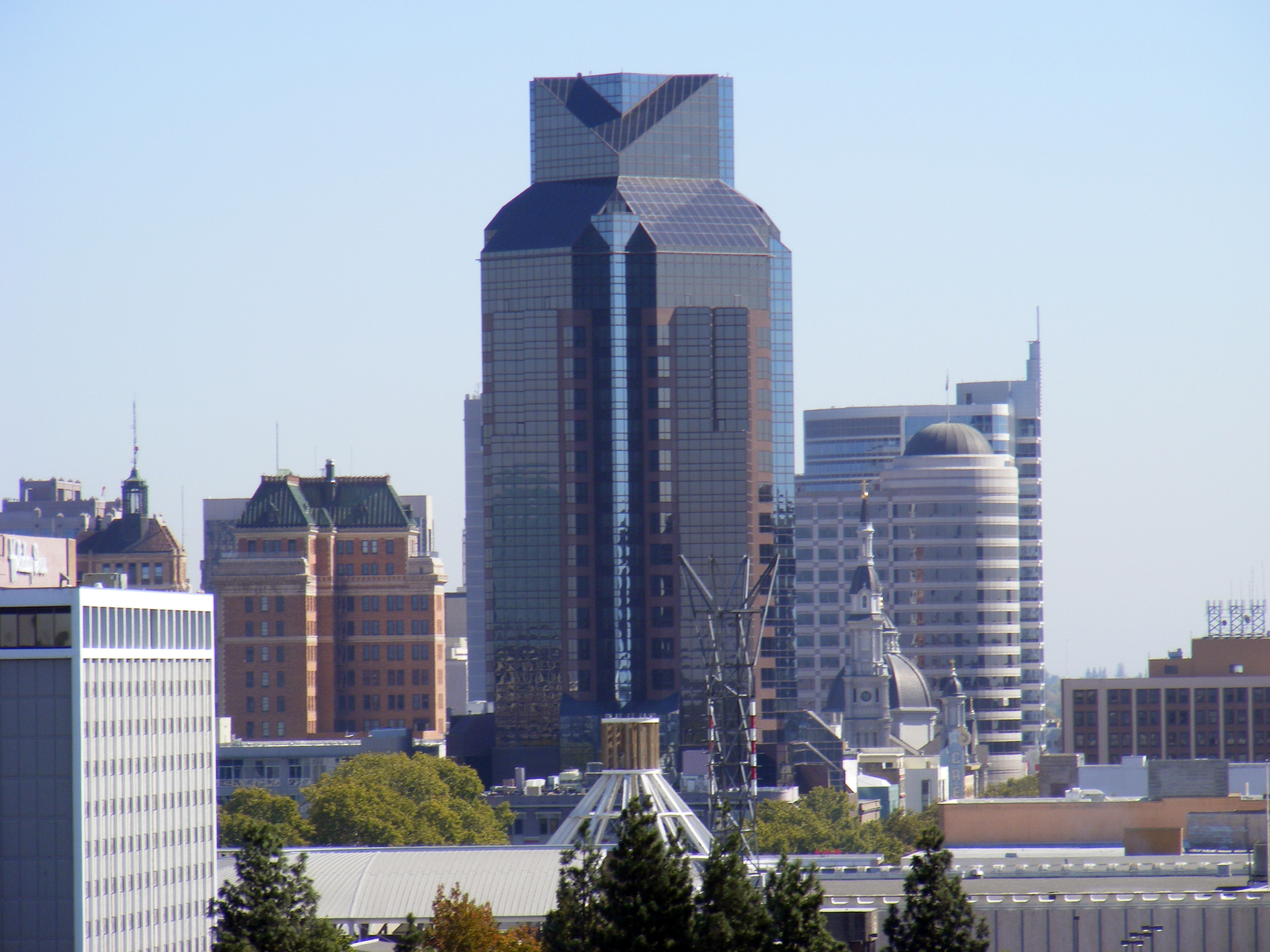

== See also ==
- List of tallest buildings in Sacramento
