= Robert T. Matsui United States Courthouse =

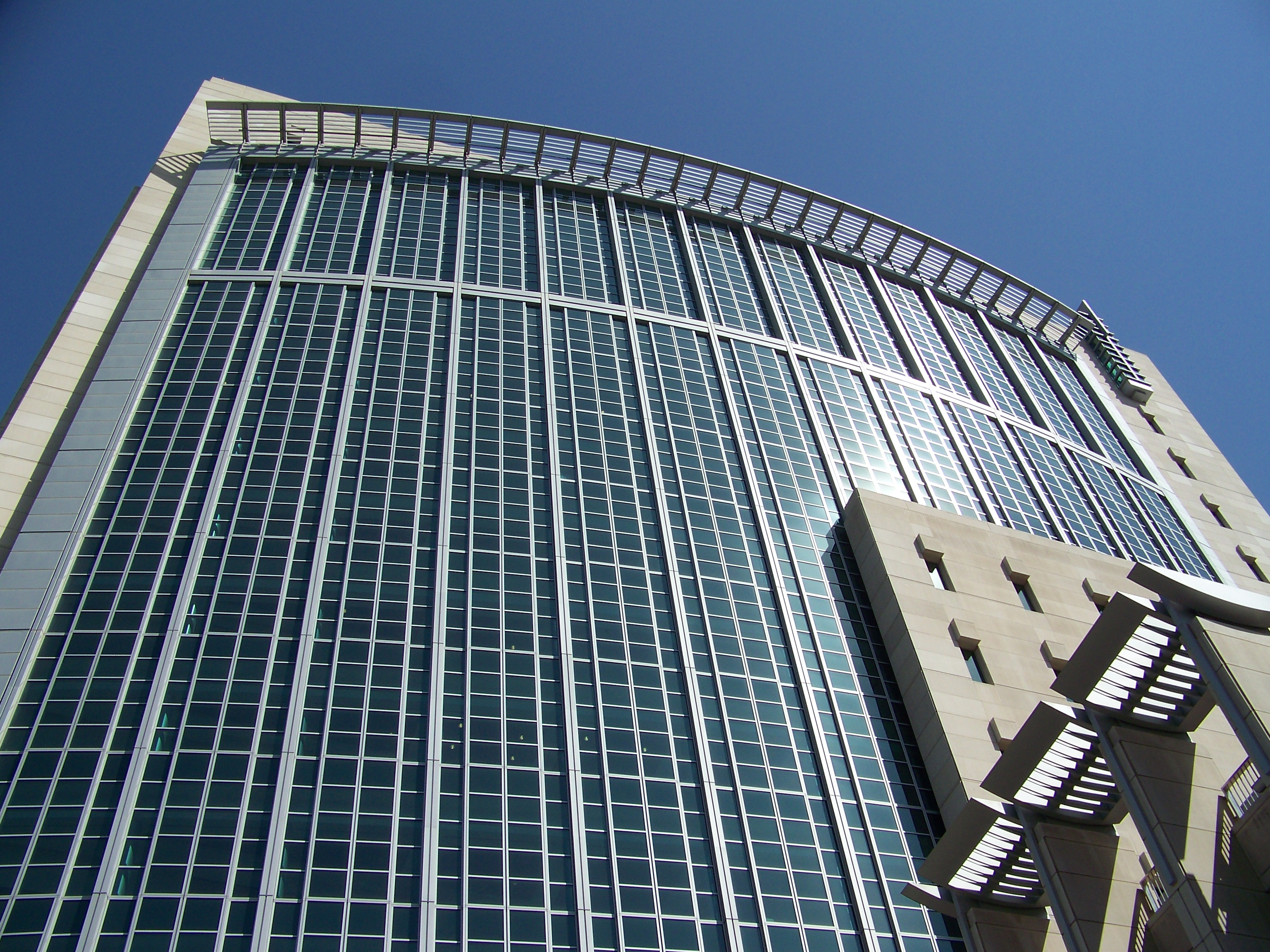

- Location within California Robert T. Matsui United States Courthouse (the United States)

General information
- Type: Federal Courthouse
- Location: 500 I Street; Sacramento, California
- Coordinates: 38.5835°N 121.49874°W

Technical details
- Floor count: 18

The Robert T. Matsui United States Courthouse is a courthouse in Sacramento, California. It is home to the Sacramento Division of the United States District Court for the Eastern District of California. It is located at 500 I Street and is named for the late congressman Bob Matsui.
