= Wells Fargo Center (Sacramento) =

Building in downtown Sacramento

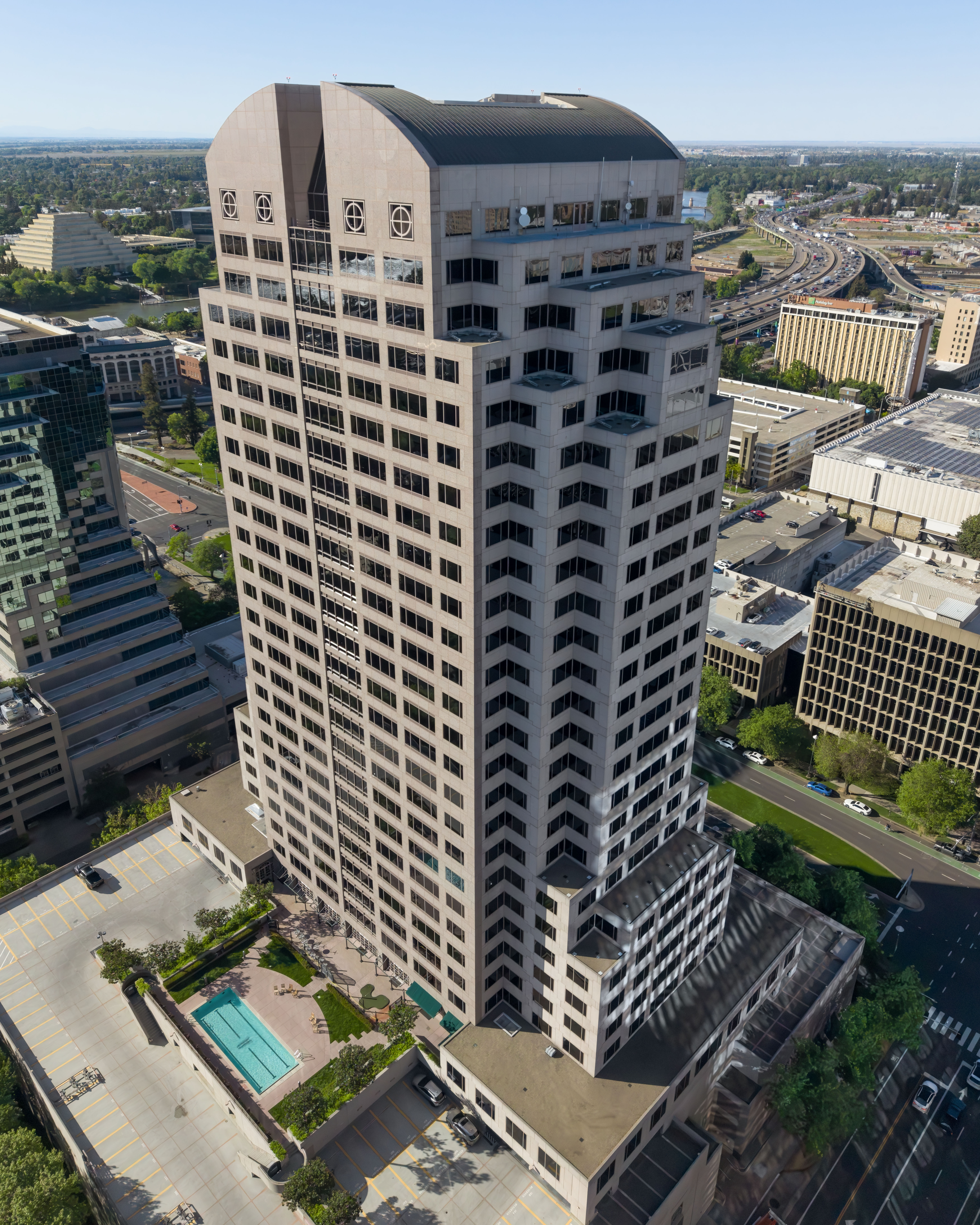
- The Wells Fargo Center is the tallest building in Sacramento, CA, and is primarily used as an office building.

- Location within California Location within the United States

General information
- Type: Commercial offices
- Location: 400 Capitol Mall; Sacramento, California
- Coordinates: 38.5784°N 121.5025°W
- Construction started: 1990
- Completed: 1992
- Cost: $49.8 million
- Owner: Hines Interests Limited Partnership
- Operator: Hines Interests Limited Partnership

Height
- Roof: 129 m (423 ft)

Technical details
- Floor count: 30 (+3 basements)
- Floor area: 549,422 sq ft (51,043.0 m^{2})
- Lifts/elevators: 13

Design and construction
- Architect: Hellmuth, Obata and Kassabaum
- Structural engineer: Middlebrook + Louie
- Main contractor: Webcor Builders

Website
- www.400capmall.com

Wells Fargo Center is a 129 m (423 ft) office building in downtown Sacramento, California. It is the tallest building in Sacramento. Construction on the skyscraper began in 1990, and construction completed in 1992. The building is the tallest in the city. The building occupies a 2.3-acre (0.93 ha) city block, and features a five-story granite and marble walled interior within a clear glass atrium. The project was developed by William Wilson & Associates in partnership with Crocker Properties. The architect was Hellmuth, Obata and Kassabaum (HOK).

A Wells Fargo History Museum dedicated to the history of Wells Fargo Bank in the Sacramento area was previously located in the ground floor lobby; it has since been permanently closed.

== Major tenants ==
- Acumen LLC
- Alston Construction
- Burton Law Firm
- CA Earthquake Authority
- CA Lawyers Association
- CalSTA
- CGI Technologies Solutions Inc
- Crowe LLP
- CunninghamLegal
- Cushman & Wakefield
- Deloitte
- Exec-U-Style Salon
- Feldesman Tucker Leifer Fidell
- Focus Litigation
- Greeenberg Traurig
- Greater Sacramento Area Econ
- Highlands Consulting Group
- Il Fornaio Restaurant
- Insight Global
- Insperity Support Svcs
- Jackson Lewis
- Kennaday Leavitt
- Law Office of Mark Wasser
- Law Office of Thomas Johnson
- Liebert Cassidy & Whitmore
- Lockton Insurance Brokers
- Morgan Stanley & Company DW, Inc.
- Obanion & Ritchey LLP
- Ogletree
- Orrick, Herrington & Sutcliffe
- Panattoni Devco
- Pricewaterhouse Coopers
- Resources Legacy Group
- Rubicon Partners
- The Ryan Law Group
- Seyfarth Shaw LLP
- Universal Medication Mgmnt
- WeWork
- Weintraub Tobin
- Wells Fargo Advisors
- Wells Fargo Bank

== Gallery ==
Wells Fargo Center, Sacramento

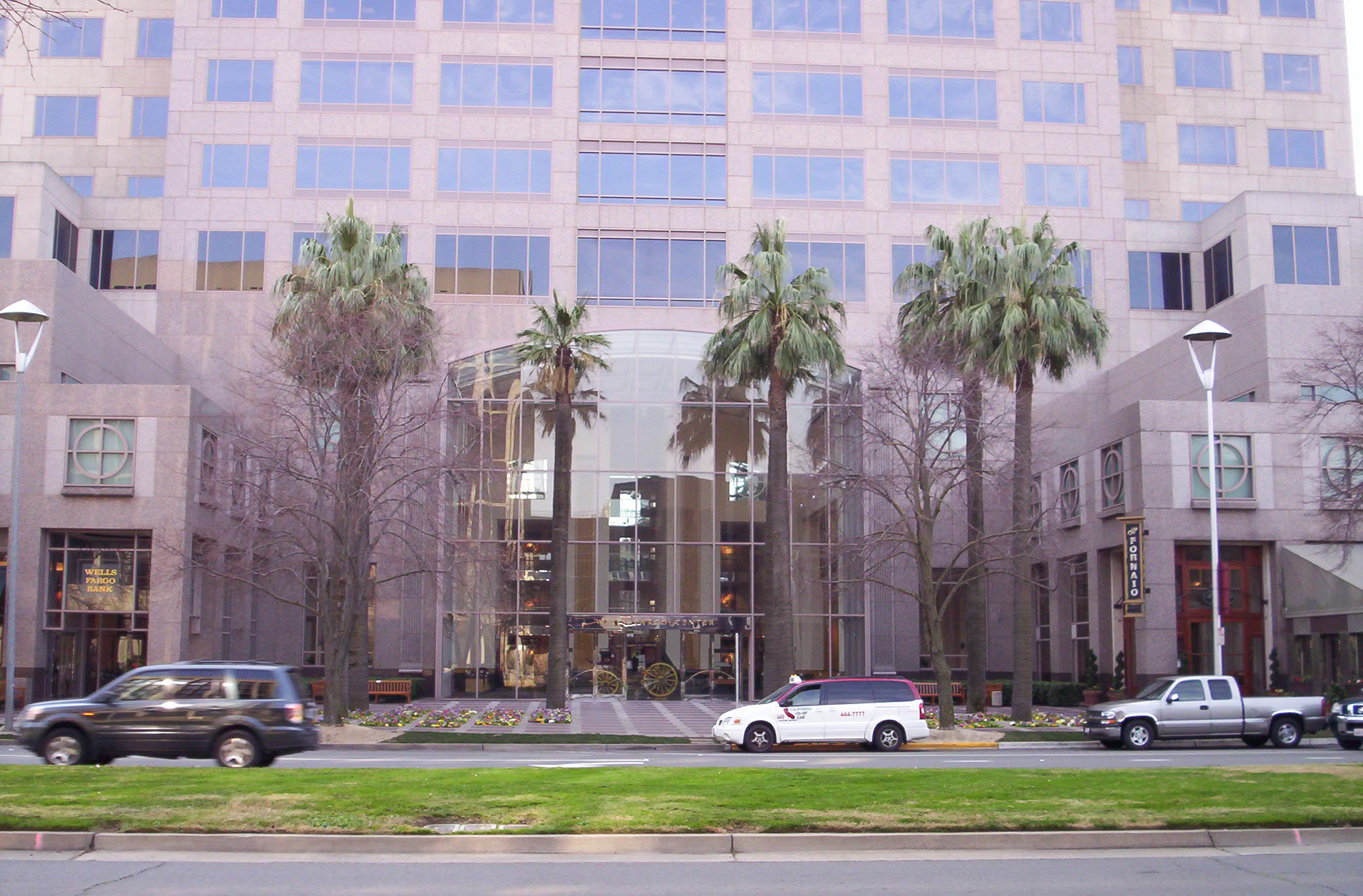

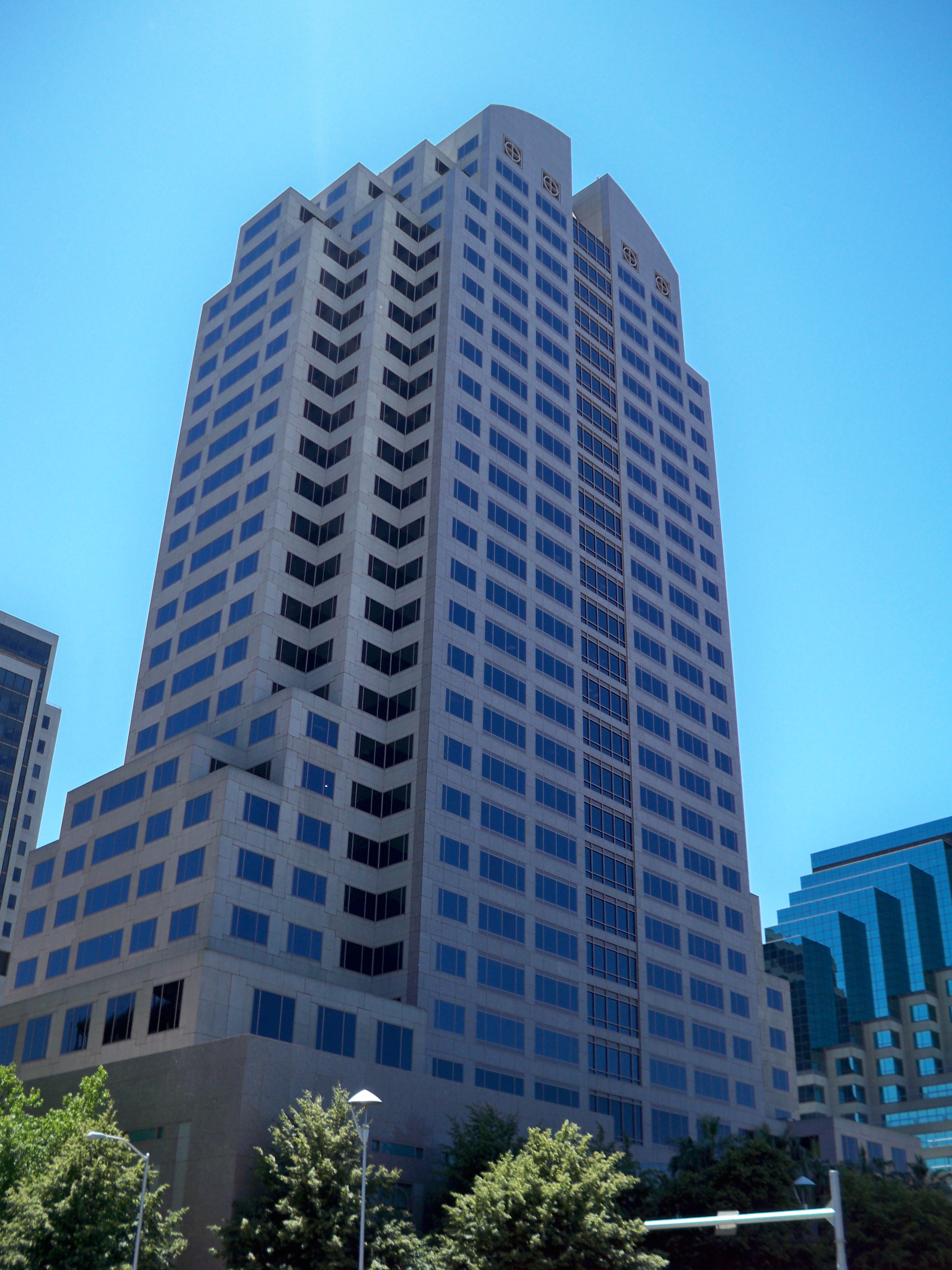

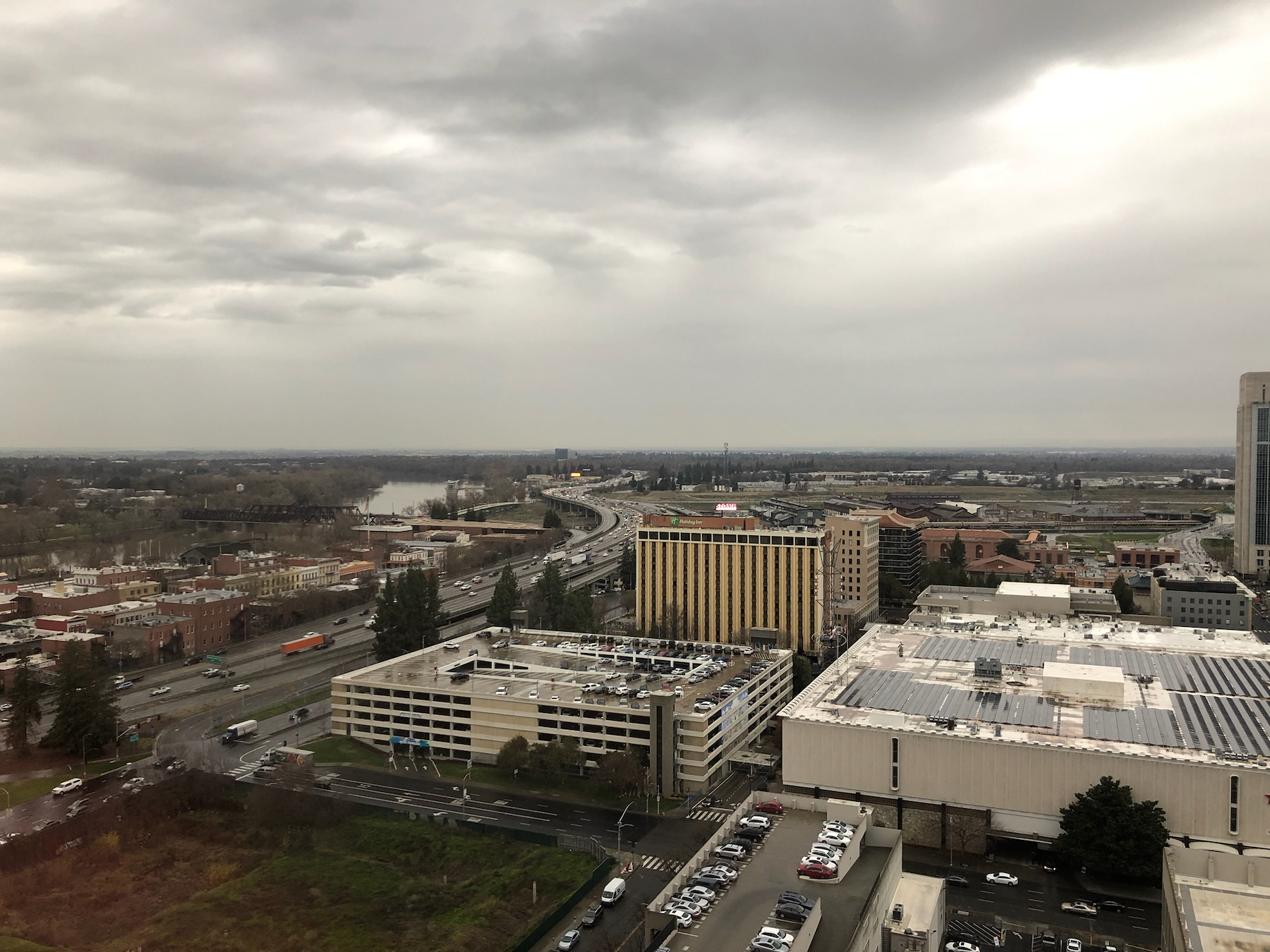

== See also ==
- List of tallest buildings in Sacramento
