= U.S. Bank Tower (Sacramento) =

Skyscraper

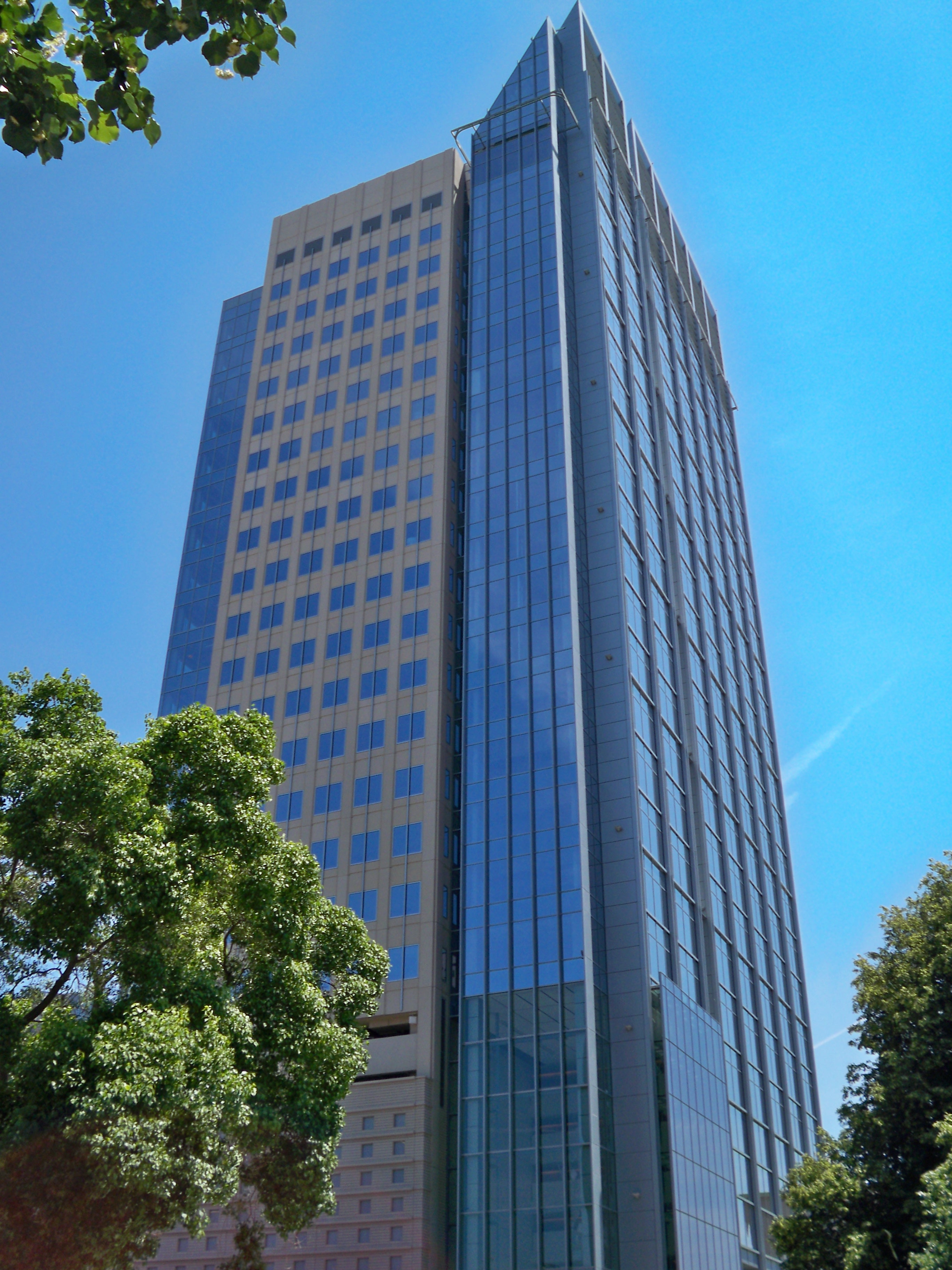
- U.S. Bank Tower upon completion in 2008
- Interactive map of the U.S. Bank Tower area
- Alternative names: 621 Capitol Mall

General information
- Status: Completed
- Type: Commercial offices
- Location: 621 Capitol Mall, Sacramento, California, U.S.
- Coordinates: 38.578611°N 121.499167°W
- Construction started: 2006
- Opening: Spring 2008

Height
- Roof: 122.5 m (402 ft)

Technical details
- Floor count: 25
- Floor area: 366,296 sq ft (34,030.0 m^{2})
- Lifts/elevators: 9

Design and construction
- Architect: Hellmuth, Obata and Kassabaum
- Developer: David S. Taylor Interests
- Main contractor: Hensel Phelps Construction

U.S. Bank Tower (also called 621 Capitol Mall) is a 25-story, 404-foot (123 m) building in Sacramento, California. The office tower is located at 621 Capitol Mall and was completed in early 2008. U.S. Bank bought the naming rights and 34,000 ft^{2} (3,200 m^{2}) of office space.

The building's architect is Hellmuth, Obata + Kassabaum, Inc. (HOK) and the general contractor is Hensel Phelps Construction.

The building has a series of LED screens on the top that seem to form a flowing river or waterway at night, with colors changing from light/dark blues to purples. They are easily seen since this building is the second tallest in Sacramento. This artwork was created by Michael Hayden of Santa Rosa, California, and is a companion to an LED installation in the lobby of the building by the same artist.

== Gallery ==
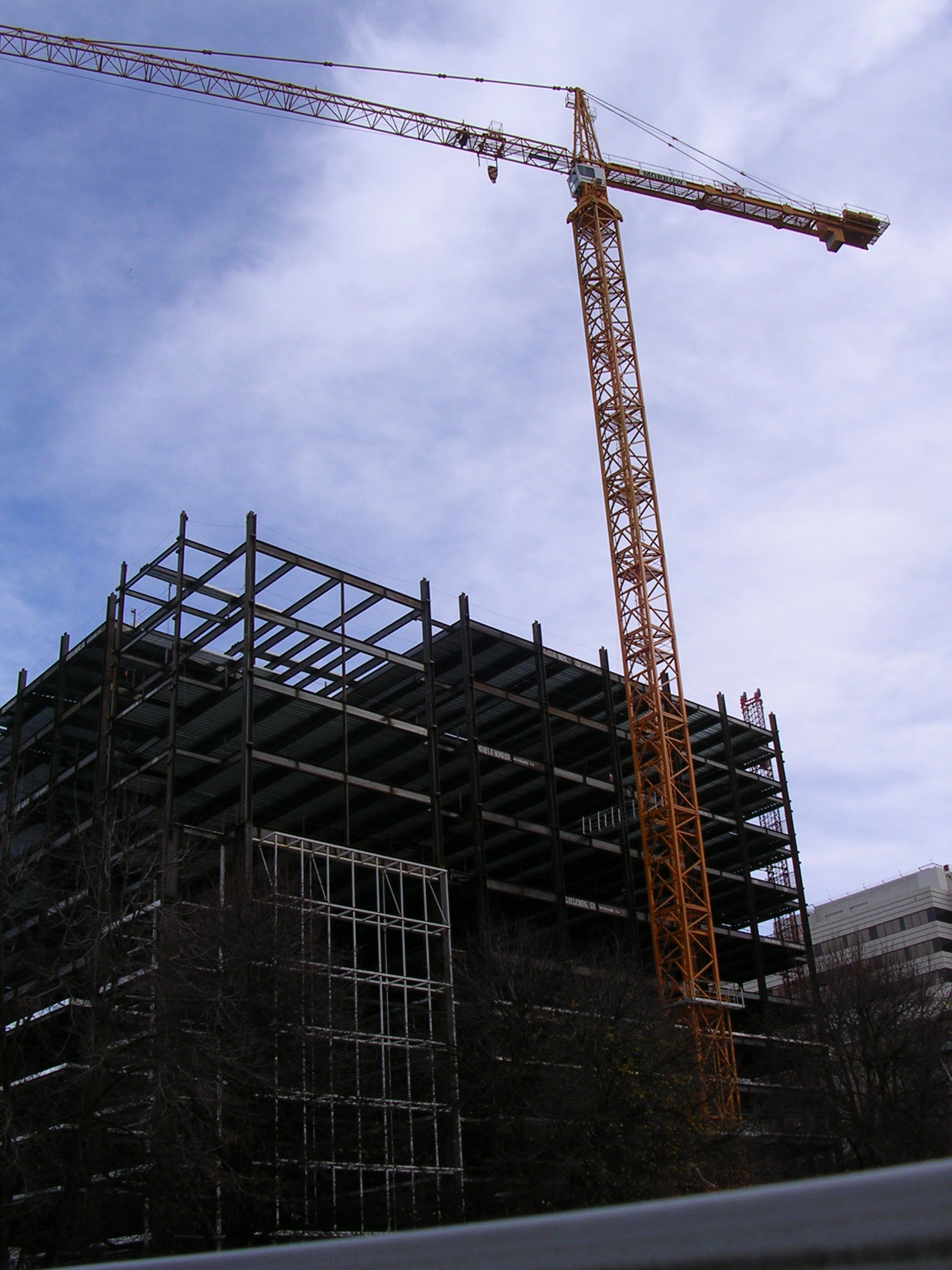
U.S. Bank Tower in mid-December 2006.

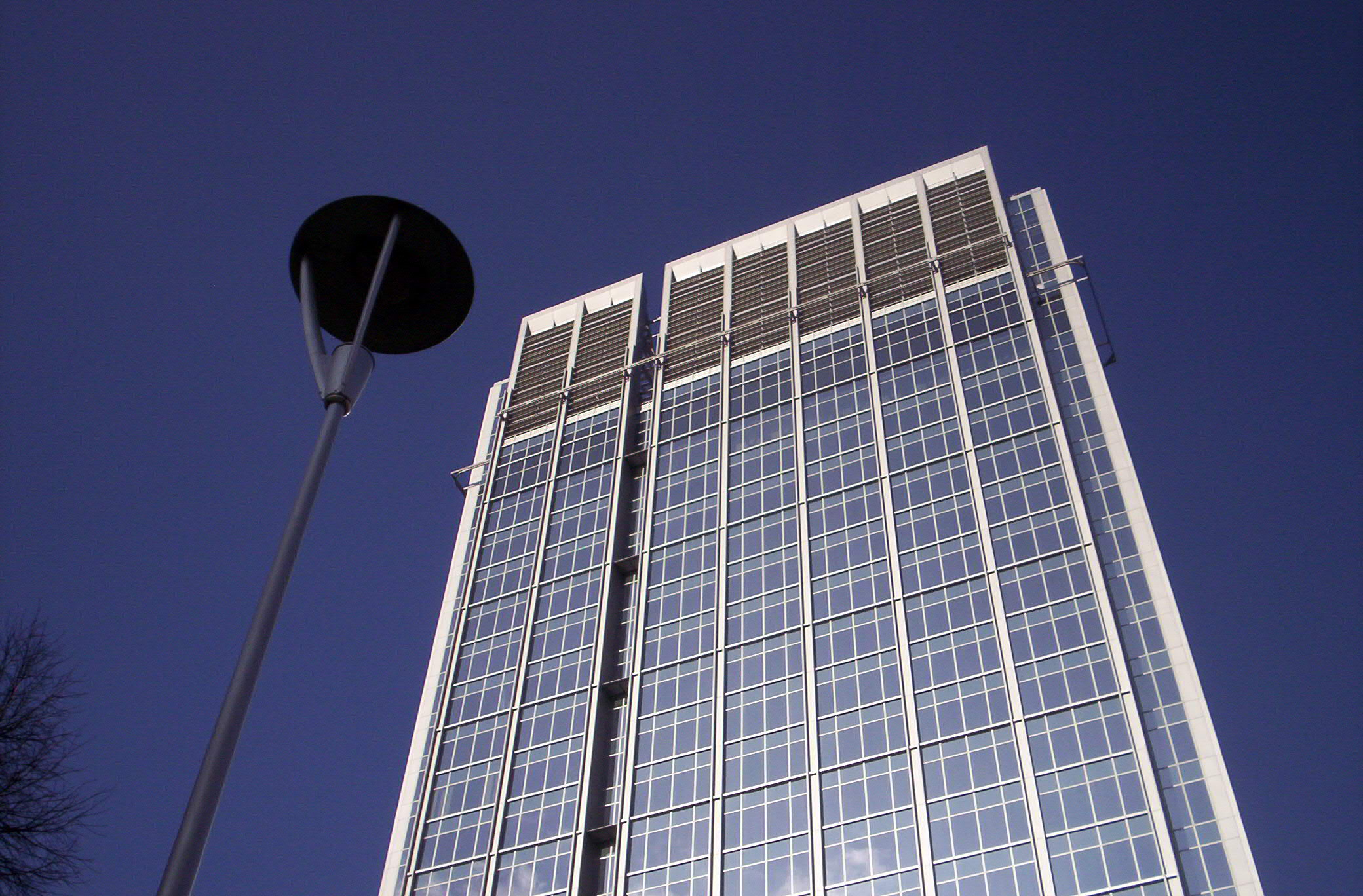
US Bank Tower was completed Spring 2008

== See also ==
- List of tallest buildings in Sacramento
