= Bank of the West Tower (Sacramento) =

BMO Tower
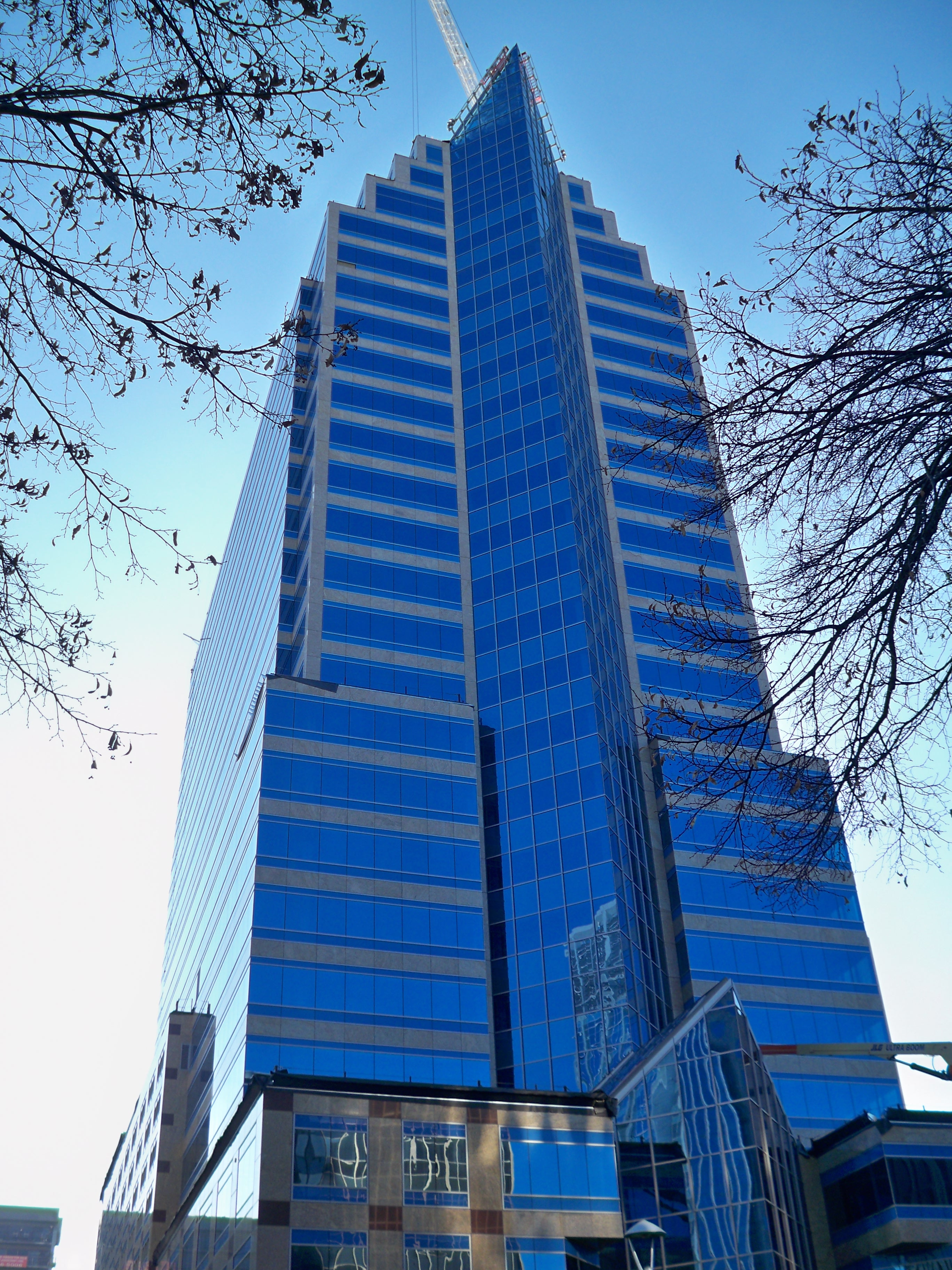

- Location within California Location within the United States
- Alternative names: Bank of the West Tower; Five Hundred Capitol Mall; The Parthenon

General information
- Type: Commercial offices
- Location: 500 Capitol Mall; Sacramento, California
- Coordinates: 38.5780°N 121.5013°W
- Construction started: 2007
- Completed: May 26, 2009

Height
- Roof: 121 m (397 ft)

Technical details
- Floor count: 25
- Floor area: 433,508 sq ft (40,274.2 m^{2})

Design and construction
- Architect: E.M. Kado & Associates
- Developer: Tsakopoulos Investments
- Structural engineer: Wood Rodgers, Inc.
- Main contractor: Rudolph & Sletten

BMO Tower, formerly Bank of the West Tower, also known as Five Hundred Capitol Mall, is a 25-story 433,508-square-foot (40,274.2 m^{2}) high-rise in downtown Sacramento, California, with a 10-level, 800 stall parking garage. The building consists of a 5-story atrium/lobby, ground floor retail, office space, and a 2-level penthouse restaurant or meeting facility. The structure has a steel frame and features a granite curtain wall with stone-on-precast and stone-on-truss panels on the exterior. The building, opened for business and welcomed its first tenant on May 26, 2009. It was originally named Bank of the West Tower due to a Bank of the West branch on its ground floor; the building was renamed BMO Tower after Bank of the West was acquired by BMO Bank in 2023. The 23rd floor is a coworking space

== Gallery ==
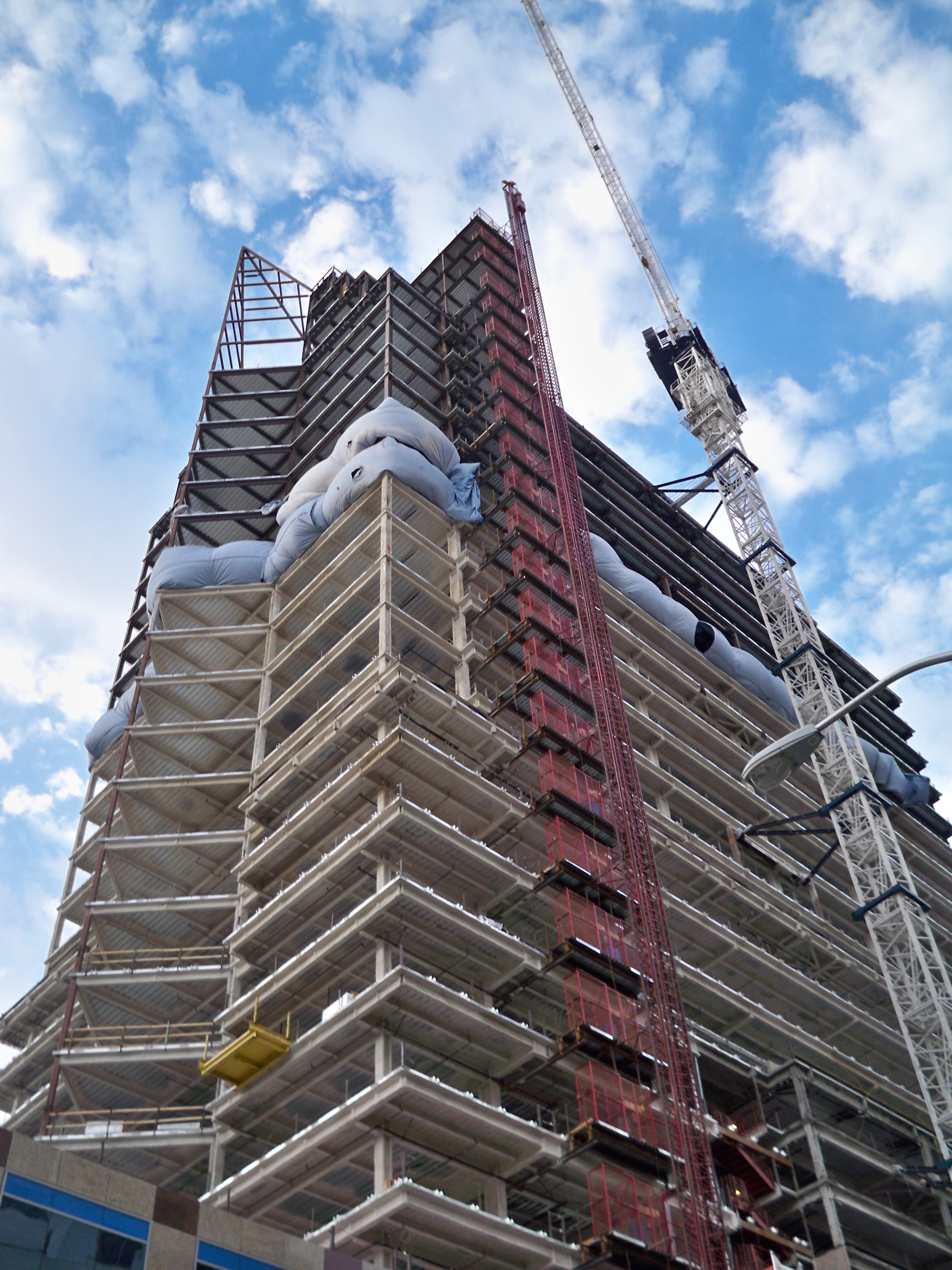

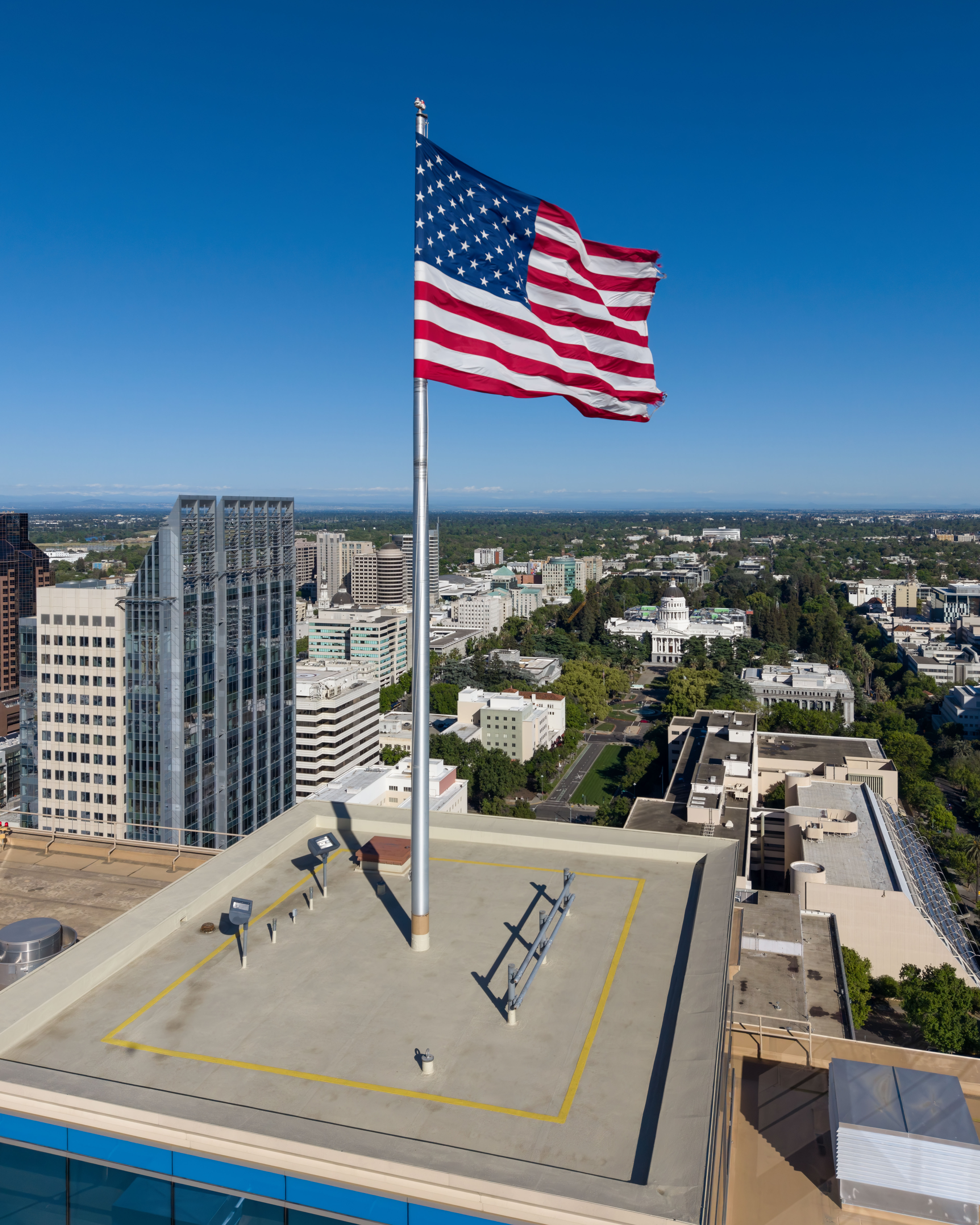

== See also ==
- List of tallest buildings in Sacramento
