= Big Four House =

- Big Four Building
- U.S. National Register of Historic Places
- U.S. National Historic Landmark
- U.S. National Historic Landmark District – Contributing property
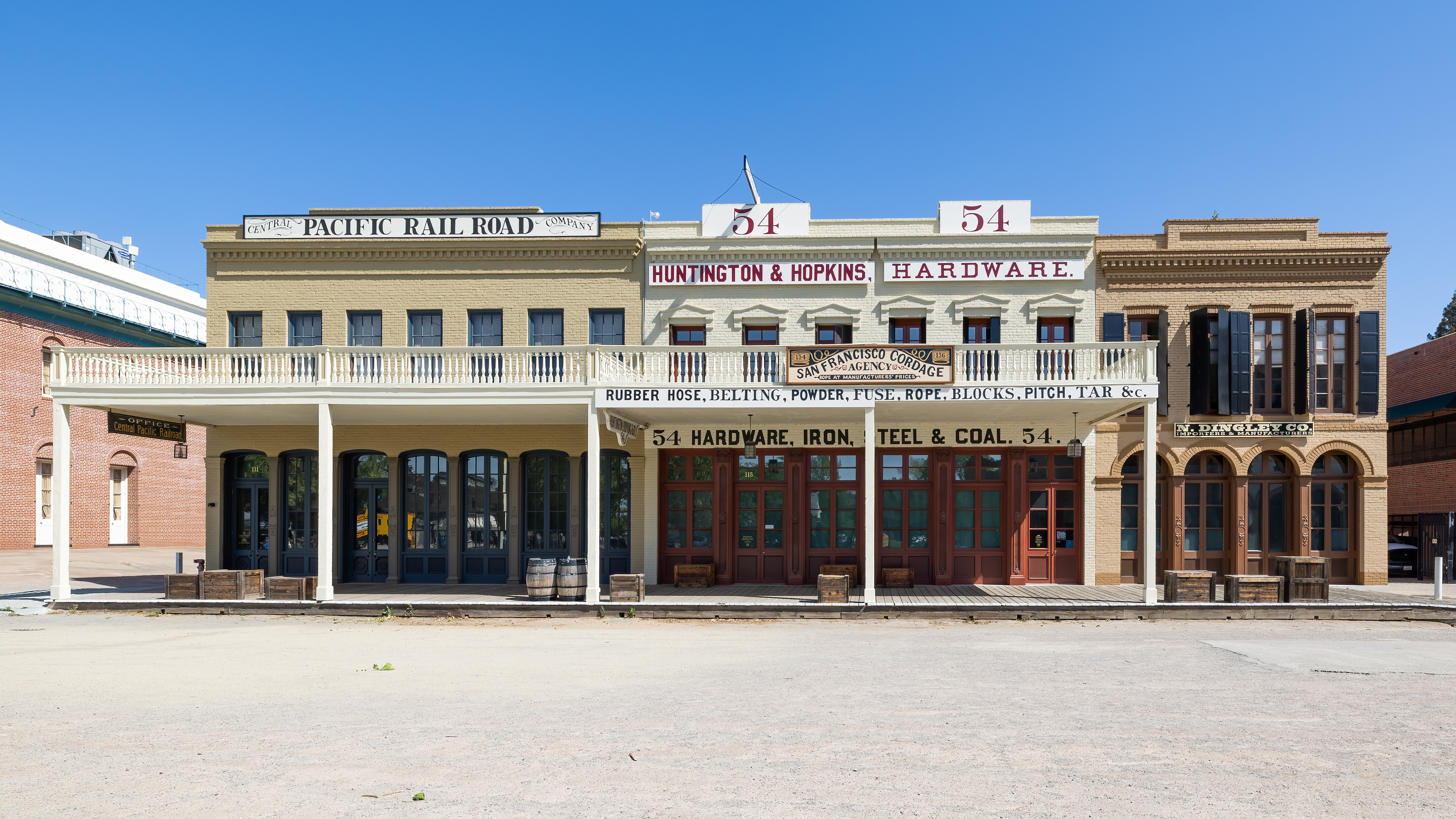
- The Big Four Building, Old Sacramento, in April 2022

- Location within Sacramento, California Location within California Location within the United States
- Location: 220–226 K Street, Sacramento, California
- Coordinates: 38°34′58″N 121°30′12″W
- Built: c. 1852
- Architectural style: Neo-Renaissance
- NRHP reference No.: 14000782

Significant dates
- Added to NRHP: October 15, 1966
- Designated NHL: July 4, 1961

The Big Four Building is a historic 19th-century building in Downtown Sacramento, California. It is now located within Old Sacramento State Historic Park and the Old Sacramento National Historic District.

== History ==
The Big Four House was originally three separate buildings constructed over 1851 to 1852, adjacent to the Sacramento River waterfront. The original three structures included the Stanford Building, the Huntington & Hopkins Building, and the Miller Building.

=== The Big Four ===
The lower floors were occupied by merchants, three of whom later became The Big Four (with Charles Crocker), hence the buildings' name. The Big Four were associated with the founding of the First transcontinental railroad linking California with the Eastern U.S. — and were Collis Huntington, Mark Hopkins, Jr., Leland Stanford, and Charles Crocker. On the second floor these buildings they organized and ran the Central Pacific Railroad Company of California, to plan, build, and operate the western section of the first Transcontinental Railroad. They also founded the Southern Pacific Railroad here. Huntington, Hopkins & Co., which imported and sold hardware, iron, steel, and coal, occupied 54 "K" Street. The second floor of these structures served as the first offices of the Central Pacific Railroad from 1862 to 1873.

By 1878 ownership was consolidated, and the structures were enlarged into one building. Over time it has also housed shops, including the Huntington & Hopkins Hardware Store, a bar and cafe, and a hotel on the second floor.

== Landmark ==
The Big Four House was declared a National Historic Landmark on July 4, 1961. It is included within the Old Sacramento Historic District, which also is a National Historic Landmark and on the National Register of Historic Places since its establishment on October 15, 1966.

It was also formerly a California Historical Landmark of its own, but now is a Historic district contributing property included in the registration of the Old Sacramento National Historic District.

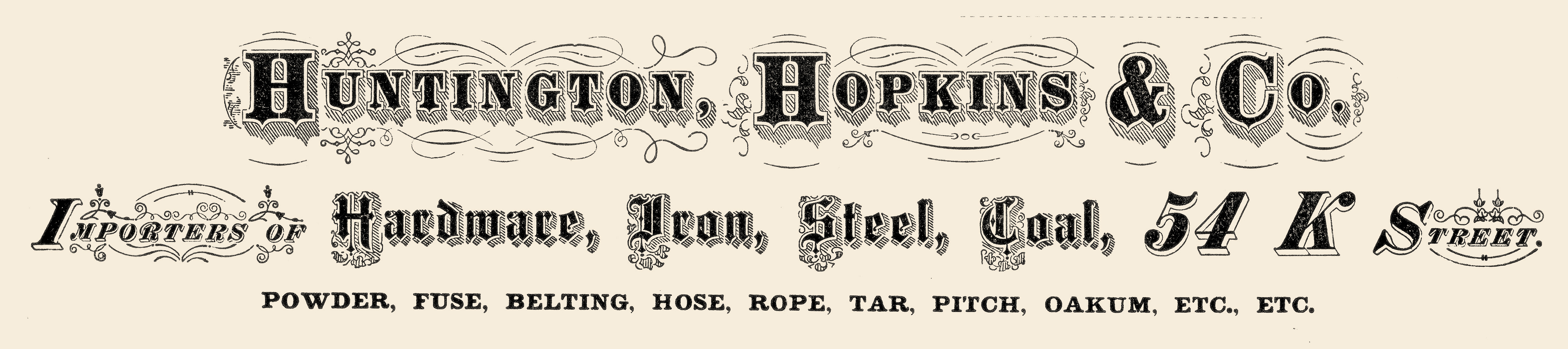
Huntington, Hopkins & Co., 54 "K" St., Sacramento (1874 billhead logotype)

== See also ==
- History of Sacramento, California
- Old Sacramento State Historic Park
- National Register of Historic Places listings in Sacramento County, California
- California Historical Landmarks in Sacramento County, California
- Index: Historic districts in California
