= Pioneer Telegraph Station =

Historical Landmark in Sacramento, United States

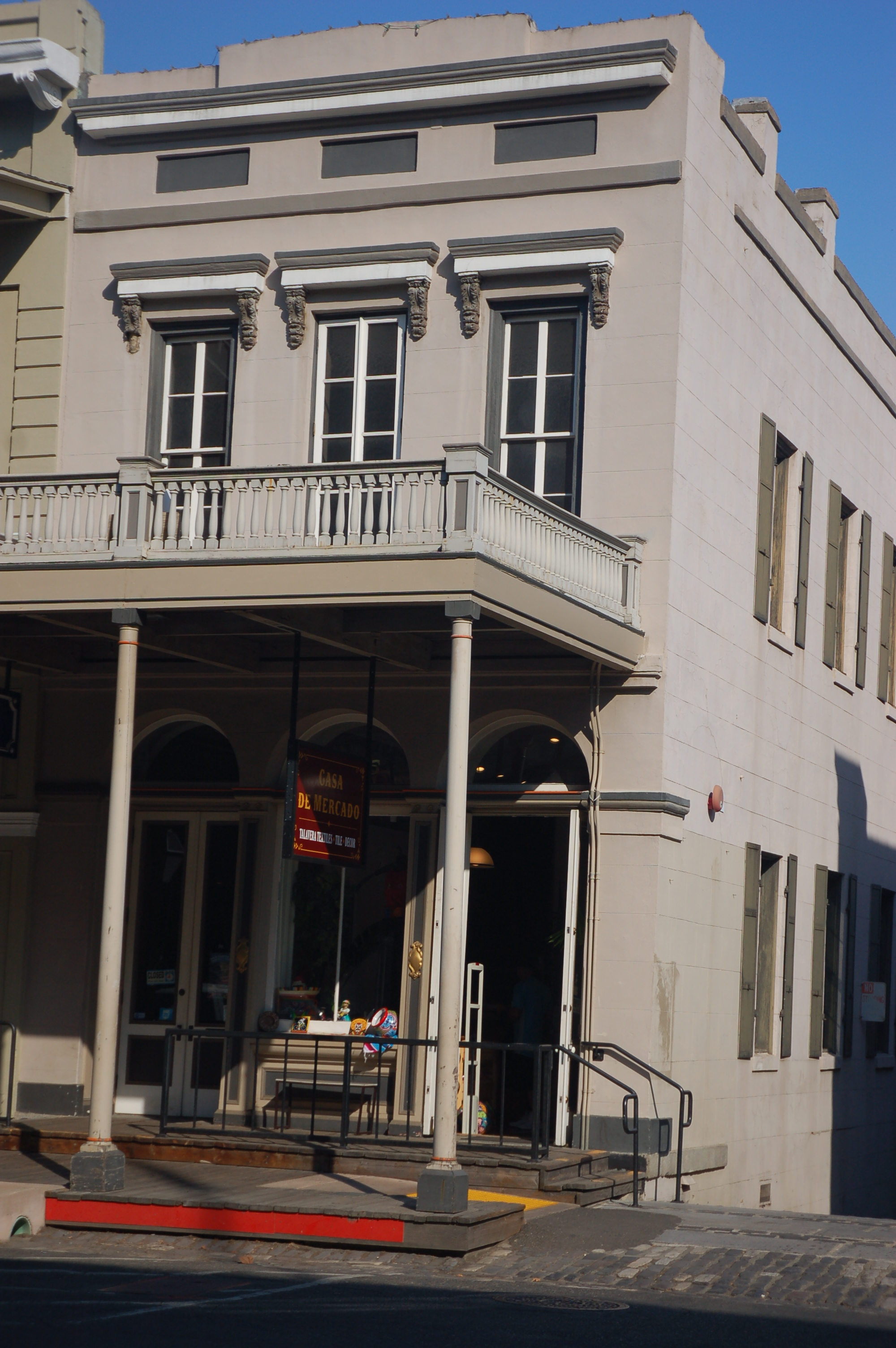
- Pioneer Telegraph Station

- Location within California Location within the United States
- 38.58263°N 121.5042°W
- Location: 1015 2nd Street; Sacramento, California

History
- Built: 1863

California Historical Landmark
- Designated: October 9, 1939
- Reference no.: 366

The Pioneer Telegraph Station is a historic building in Sacramento, California. It is California Historical Landmark No. 366, listed on October 9, 1939. From 1863 to 1868 the building housed the State Telegraph Company, and from 1868 to 1915 it housed the Union Telegraph Company. It is part of the Old Sacramento State Historic Park. The Pioneer Telegraph Station Building is sometimes confused with the Pony Express Terminal building, also in Old Sacramento State Historic Park.

== See also ==
- California Historical Landmarks in Sacramento County
- Adams and Company Building
- Sam Brannan House
- Western Hotel
- Sacramento First Courthouse
- Lady Adams Building
