= Overton Building =

Historical Landmark in Sacramento, United States

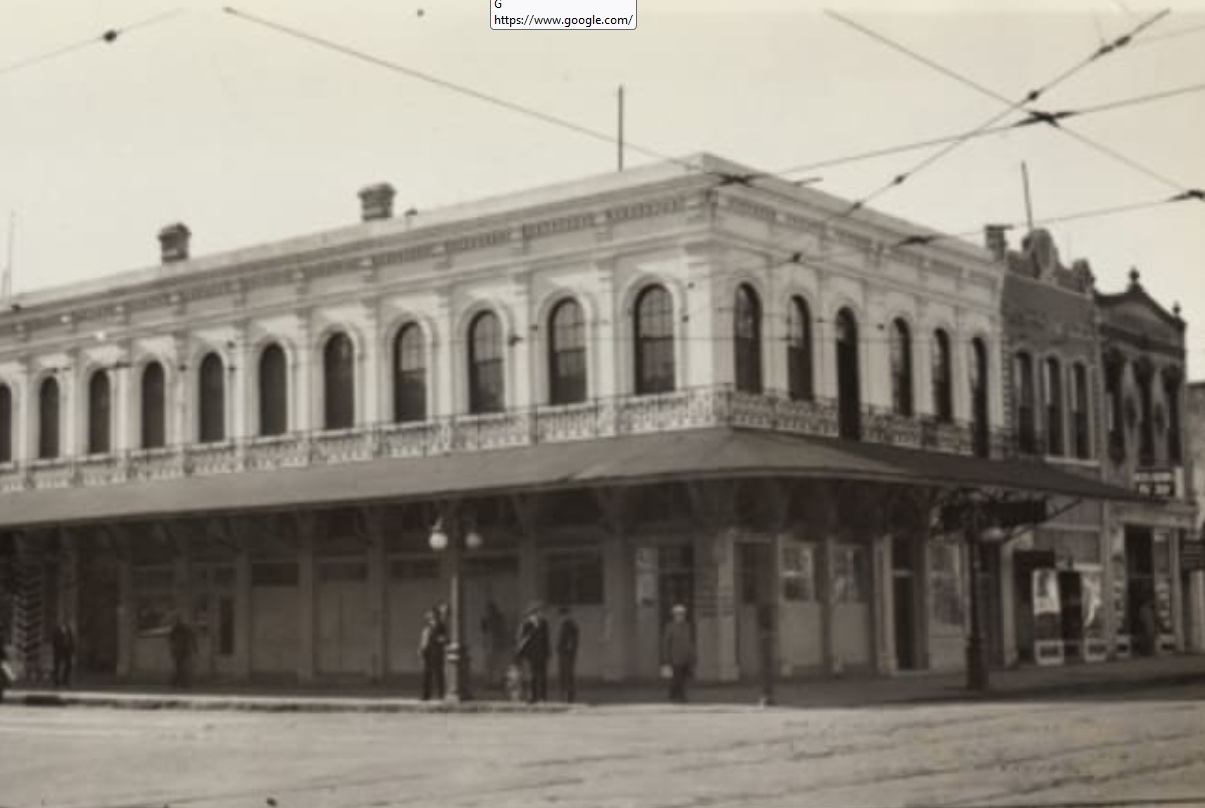
- Overton Building

- Location within California Location within the United States
- 38.582°N 121.503°W
- Location: 2nd and J Streets; Sacramento, California

History
- Built: 1852

California Historical Landmark
- Designated: May 22, 1956
- Reference no.: 610

Overton Building was a historical two-story building in Sacramento, California. The site of former Overton Building is a California Historical Landmark No. 610 listed on May 22, 1956. This site is now a Parking lot near the corner of 2nd street and J Street in Old Sacramento State Historic Park. The Overton Building was removed when the Interstate 5 freeway was built in the 1960s. The historical Western Hotel, D.O. Mills Bank and the original Sacramento Bee building were also taken down for the I-5 freeway. The Overton Building first housed a number of California state offices including: the California Governor's Office and the California Secretary of State. The building, on the lot before the Overton Building, was lost in a fire on November 2, 1852. The first California State Library was housed on the second floor from 1853 to 1856. The building was built by the bankers, Read & Company at a cost $105,000 in 1852. In the 1950s and early 1960s Overton Building was the Rialto Hotel and Rialto Cafe.

== See also ==
- California Historical Landmarks in Sacramento County
- Adams and Company Building
