= California Historical Landmarks in Sacramento County =

This list includes properties and districts listed on the California Historical Landmark listing in Sacramento County, California. Click the "Map of all coordinates" link to the right to view a Google map of all properties and districts with latitude and longitude coordinates in the table below.

Image		Landmark name	Location	City or town	Summary
Adams and Company Building	607	Adams and Company Building	Old Sacramento Historic District, 1014 2nd St. 38°34′57″N 121°30′16″W	Sacramento	
African Methodist Episcopal Church	1013	African Methodist Episcopal Church	715 Seventh St. 38°35′03″N 121°29′46″W	Sacramento	
B.F. Hastings Building	606	B.F. Hastings Building	Old Sacramento State Historic Park, 1000 2nd St. 38°34′59″N 121°30′15″W	Sacramento	
Booth Company	596	Booth Company	1015-17 Front St. 38°35′00″N 121°30′20″W	Sacramento	
California Almond Growers exchange process facility	967	California Almond Growers exchange process facility	1809 C St. 38°35′06″N 121°28′43″W	Sacramento	
California’s First Passenger Railroad	526	California’s First Passenger Railroad	3rd and R Sts. 38°34′26″N 121°30′24″W	Sacramento	
California State Capitol	872	California State Capitol	10th St and Capitol Mall; 38°34′36″N 121°29′36″W	Sacramento	
Camp Union, Sutterville	666	Camp Union, Sutterville	Sutterville and Land Park Dr. 38°32′16″N 121°30′15″W	Sacramento	
Chevra Kaddisha Cemetery	654	Chevra Kaddisha Cemetery	3230 J St. 38°34′18″N 121°27′50″W	Sacramento	
China Slough	594	China Slough	Sacramento Station; 38°35′02″N 121°30′00″W	Sacramento	
Coloma Road - Nimbus Dam	746	Coloma Road - Nimbus Dam	Folsom Lake State Recreation Area; 38°38′03″N 121°13′01″W	Granite Bay	
Coloma Road - Sutter's Fort	745	Coloma Road - Sutter's Fort	28th and L Sts. Sutter's Fort State Historic Park; 38°34′19″N 121°28′13″W	Sacramento	
D.O. Mills Bank Building	609	D.O. Mills Bank Building	Old Sacramento State Historic Park, 2nd and J Sts; 38°34′58″N 121°30′15″W	Sacramento	
E.B. Crocker Art Gallery	599	E.B. Crocker Art Gallery	216 O St. 38°34′37″N 121°30′18″W	Sacramento	
Eagle Theatre (Sacramento, California)	595	Eagle Theatre (Sacramento, California)	Old Sacramento State Historic Park, 925 Front St; 38°35′01″N 121°30′19″W	Sacramento	
First and second state capitols	869	First and second state capitols	7th and I Sts. 38°34′57″N 121°29′49″W	Sacramento	
Ebner's Hotel	602	Ebner's Hotel	116 1/2 K St.	Sacramento	
Elk Grove Free Library	817	Elk Grove Free Library	9125 Elk Grove Blvd. 38°24′33″N 121°21′41″W	Elk Grove	
Fifteen Mile House - Overland Pony Express Route	698	Fifteen Mile House - Overland Pony Express Route	White Rock & Gold Valley Rds. 38°35′20″N 121°15′43″W	Rancho Cordova	
First Jewish Synagogue owned by a congregation on the west coast	654	First Jewish Synagogue owned by a congregation on the west coast	7th St between Capitol and L 38°34′41″N 121°29′57″W	Sacramento	
Five Mile House - Overland Pony Express Route	697	Five Mile House - Overland Pony Express Route	California State University, 6000 "J" St., left on State University Drive East to Guy West Bridge over-crossing and plaza. Plaque located in plaza. 38°33′42″N 121°25′20″W	Sacramento	
Folsom - Overland Pony Express Route	702	Folsom - Overland Pony Express Route	819 Sutter St. 38°40′34″N 121°10′41″W	Folsom	Pony Express in Folsom
Folsom Terminal	558	Folsom Terminal	Leidesdorff Plaza; 38°40′33″N 121°10′49″W	Folsom	
Folsom Powerhouse	633	Folsom Powerhouse	Folsom Powerhouse State Historic Park; 38°40′50″N 121°10′32″W	Folsom	
Governor's Mansion	823	Governor's Mansion	Governor's Mansion State Historic Park; 38°34′49″N 121°29′01″W	Sacramento	
Grave of Alexander Hamilton Willard	657	Grave of Alexander Hamilton Willard	Franklin Cemetery; 38°22′37″N 121°27′22″W	Franklin	
Grave of Elitha Cumi Donner Wilder	719	Grave of Elitha Cumi Donner Wilder	Elk Grove Masonic Cemetery, Row C, Lot 2; 38°24′31″N 121°23′07″W	Elk Grove	Donner Party survivor
Lady Adams Building	603	Lady Adams Building	Old Sacramento Historic District, 117-19 K St. 38°34′57″N 121°30′19″W	Sacramento	
Leland Stanford Mansion State Historic Park	614	Leland Stanford Mansion State Historic Park	800 N St. 38°34′34″N 121°29′52″W	Sacramento	
Michigan Bar	468	Michigan Bar	State Hwy 16. 38°29′10″N 121°03′11″W	Rancho Murieta	
Murphy's Corral	680	Murphy's Corral	Grant Line Rd and Hwy 99; 38°22′29″N 121°21′43″W	Elk Grove	Also called Murphy's Ranch
New Helvetia Cemetery	592	New Helvetia Cemetery	Alhambra Blvd. and J St. 38°34′22″N 121°27′54″W	Sacramento	
Nisipowinan Village	900	Nisipowinan Village	Sacramento Discovery Park	Sacramento	
Old Folsom Powerhouse Station	633	Old Folsom Powerhouse Station	NE corner of 6th and H Sts; 38°35′02″N 121°29′52″W	Sacramento	633-2 subset of Folsom Powerhouse
Old Sacramento	812	Old Sacramento	Old Sacramento State Historic Park; 38°34′58″N 121°30′12″W	Sacramento	
Original Sacramento Bee building site	611	Original Sacramento Bee building site	Under N-bound offramp of I-5, W side of 3rd St between J and K Sts; 38°34′52″N 121°30′11″W	Sacramento	
Orleans Hotel	608	Orleans Hotel	Old Sacramento Historic District, 1018 2nd St. 38°34′58″N 121°30′16″W	Sacramento	
Overton Building	610	Overton Building	Old Sacramento State Historic Park, 2nd and J Sts. 38°34′55″N 121°30′11″W	Sacramento	
Pioneer First Congregational Church	613	Pioneer First Congregational Church	915 6th St. 38°34′55″N 121°29′53″W	Sacramento	
Pioneer Mutual Volunteer Firehouse	612	Pioneer Mutual Volunteer Firehouse	200 ft NE of intersection of 3rd and J Sts; 38°34′58″N 121°30′09″W	Sacramento	
Prairie City	464	Prairie City	Prairie City Rd, 500 ft N of State Hwy 50; 38°38′37″N 121°09′26″W	Folsom	
Pioneer Telegraph Station	366	Pioneer Telegraph Station	1015-2nd St, Old Sacramento; 38°34′57″N 121°30′15″W	Sacramento	
Sacramento Assembly Center aka Camp Kohler	934	Sacramento Assembly Center aka Camp Kohler	Walerga Park; 38°40′06″N 121°21′05″W	Sacramento	
Sacramento Historic City Cemetery	566	Sacramento Historic City Cemetery	Broadway and 10th Sts. 38°33′49″N 121°30′03″W	Sacramento	
Sacramento Union	605	Sacramento Union	Old Sacramento Historic District, 121 J St. 38°35′00″N 121°30′16″W	Sacramento	
Sheldon Grist Mill	439	Sheldon Grist Mill	Meiss Rd and Hwy 16; 38°29′47″N 121°11′50″W	Sloughhouse	
Site of Stage and Railroad	598	Site of Stage and Railroad	Old Sacramento State Historic Park; 38°34′55″N 121°30′22″W	Sacramento	
Sam Brannan House	604	Sam Brannan House	Old Sacramento Historic District, 112 J. St. 38°35′00″N 121°30′19″W	Sacramento	
Sloughhouse	575	Sloughhouse	Meiss St & Hwy 16. 38°29′47″N 121°11′47″W	Sacramento	
State Indian Museum	991	State Indian Museum	2618 K St. 38°34′22″N 121°28′17″W	Sacramento	
Sutterville	593	Sutterville	Sutterville Rd, vicinity of Land Park Dr. 38°32′45″N 121°30′30″W	Sacramento	
Sutter's Landing	591	Sutter's Landing	28th and C Sts. 38°34′53″N 121°27′57″W	Sacramento	
First Transcontinental Railroad	780	First Transcontinental Railroad	Old Sacramento State Historic Park, California State Railroad Museum; 38°35′04″N 121°30′14″W	Sacramento	780.0 - January 8, 1863, Governor Leland Stanford turned the first spade of earth of Railroad.
First Transcontinental Railroad - Western base of Sierra Nevada	780	First Transcontinental Railroad - Western base of Sierra Nevada	Haggin Oaks Municipal Golf Course, N side of clubhouse, 3645 Fulton Ave. 38°35′02″N 121°30′11″W	Sacramento	780.8 - Abraham Lincoln Railroad decreed
Western Hotel	601	Western Hotel	Parking lot, 200 ft NE of intersection of 2nd and K Sts. 38°34′55″N 121°30′11″W	Sacramento	
What Cheer House	597	What Cheer House	Front and K Sts. 38°34′55″N 121°30′18″W	Sacramento	

== See also ==
- List of California Historical Landmarks
- National Register of Historic Places listings in Sacramento County, California
