= Sam Brannan House =

Historical Landmark in Sacramento, United States

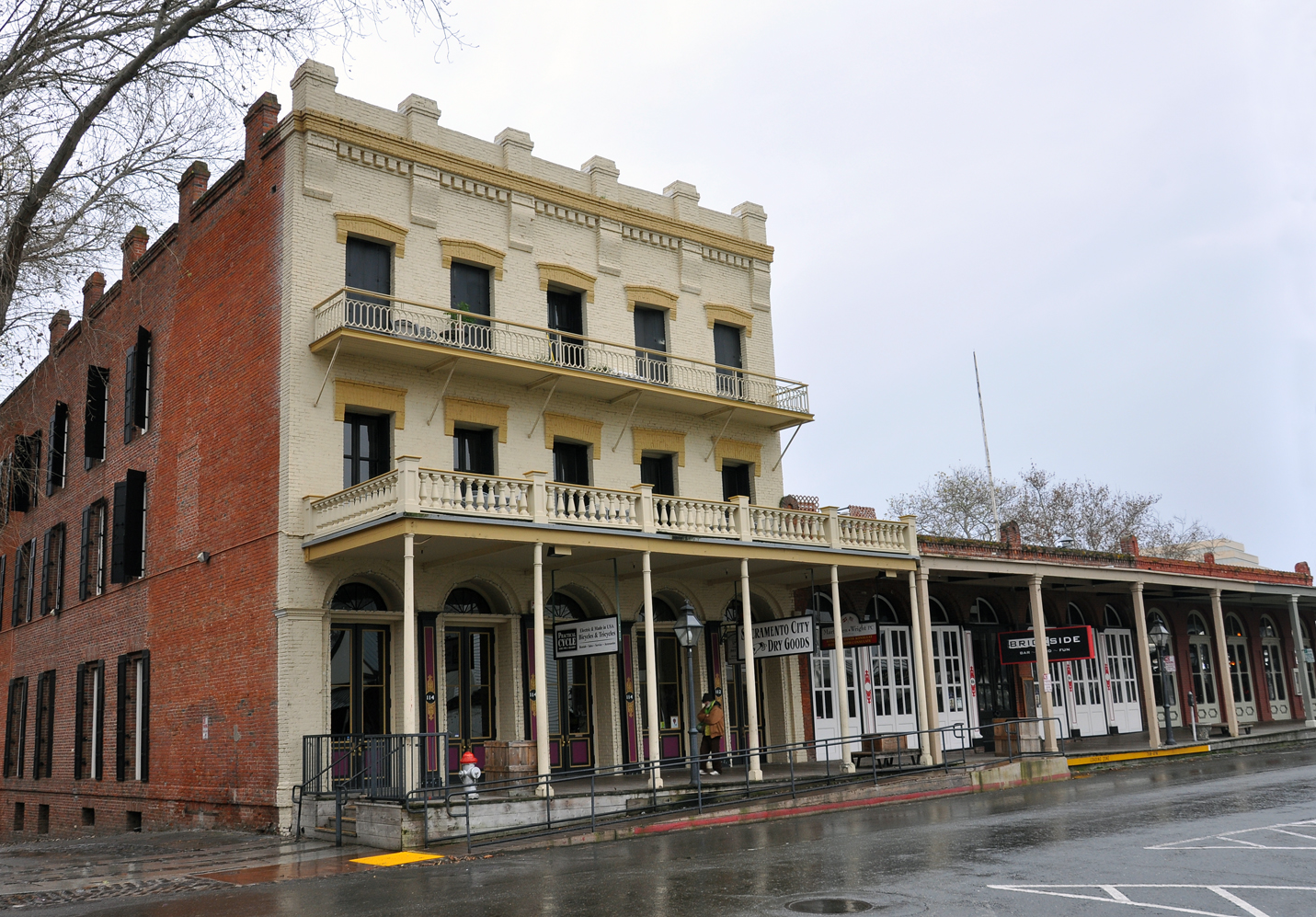

- Location within California Location within the United States
- 38.5834°N 121.5052°W
- Location: 112 J Street; Sacramento, California

History
- Built: 1853

California Historical Landmark
- Designated: May 22, 1957
- Reference no.: 604

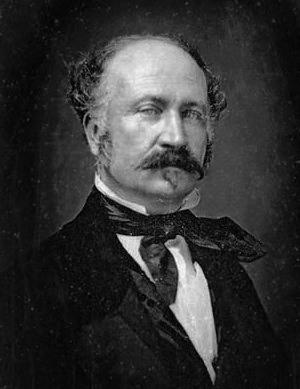
John A. Sutter became the first honorary member of the Sacramento Pioneer Association in 1854 at the Jones Hotel (Sam Brannan House) on January 24, 1854

Sam Brannan House, also called the Vernon-Brannan House, Jones Hotel and Vernon House is an 1853 historical building in Sacramento, California. The building is a California Historical Landmark No. 604 listed on May 22, 1957. The three-story brick Sam Brannan House is at 112 J Street, Sacramento in Old Sacramento State Historic Park.

== History ==
Before the Sam Brannan House was built, the lot had an 1849 wooden building that was Sacramento's first US post office. The US post office was burnt to the ground in an 1852 fire. The three-story brick building was built on the lot in 1853, by Henry E. Robinson. The lot was owned by Samuel Brannan. The three-story brick building became the Jones Hotel. In 1854 the Sacramento Pioneer Association was founded in the Jones Hotel meeting room. The Jones Hotel was sold in 1855 and became the Vernon House run by Miss O. J. Clark as boarding house. Clark sold the building to Peter Bryding, who returned it to a hotel in 1865 and renamed it the Brannan House, in honor to the first owner of the land, Samuel Brannan (1819–1889). The City of Sacramento had a 13-year program in the 1860s and 1870s, to raise the buildings and streets in Sacramento to stop the flooding problem in the city, like the Great Flood of 1862. The Sam Brannan House was raised 9 feet in 1865, stopping the flooding by the Sacramento River and American River. The Historical building is a Colderbank office today in Old Sacramento.

== Sacramento Pioneer Association ==
The Sacramento Pioneer Association was founded on January 24, 1854, in the Jones Hotel (Sam Brannan House) by 70 Sacramento California pioneers. Just five years after the 1849 California Gold Rush, these early pioneers wanted to celebrate and preserve the unique time and place of the Gold Rush and those that came west for opportunity. Some of the Sacramento Pioneer Association founding members were: Joseph W. Winans (first president), Mark Hopkins, General Albert Maver Winn, John Sutter, James W. Marshall, J. Neely Johnson, John Bigler, Newton Booth, B. F. Hastings, D. O. Mills, Hugh McElroy LaRue, Collis Potter Huntington, Nathaniel D. Goodell, James Anthony (Sacramento Union) and James McClatchy. Sacramento Pioneer Association works to preserve Sacramento's history, the historical past, including: artifacts, documents and historic buildings. Sacramento Pioneer Association worked on the Sutter's Fort project. The Sacramento Pioneer Association's president from 1857 to 1859 was Dr. John F. Morse, he wrote the first history of Sacramento and built the Morse Building. Sacramento Pioneer Association are owners and run the Pioneer Grove Cemetery that with in the Sacramento Historic City Cemetery. Sacramento Pioneer Association owns and run the Pioneer Hall on Seventh Street. Pioneer Hall built in 1868 is the oldest building in California under continuous ownership of one owner. Before Pioneer Hall was built the Sacramento Pioneer Association had meeting at the County Court at Front and J Streets and the Hook and Ladder Company No. 1 firehouse on 8th Street. Sacramento Pioneer Association incorporated the non-profit organization Sacramento Pioneer Foundation in 1966. Pioneer Hall is the headquarters of Sacramento Society of California Pioneers

== See also ==
- California Historical Landmarks in Sacramento County
- Adams and Company Building
