= Sacramento First Courthouse =

Historical Landmark in Sacramento, United States

Former California State Capitol Sacramento First Courthouse
- 1852 California State Capitol and Sacramento County Courthouse

- Location within California Location within the United States
- 38.5825°N 121.4970°W
- Location: 651 I Street, Sacramento, California (7th Street and I Street)

History
- Built: 1851, 1854

Site notes
- Architect: Greek Revival
- Architectural style: David Farquharson

California Historical Landmark
- Designated: January 11, 1974
- Reference no.: 869

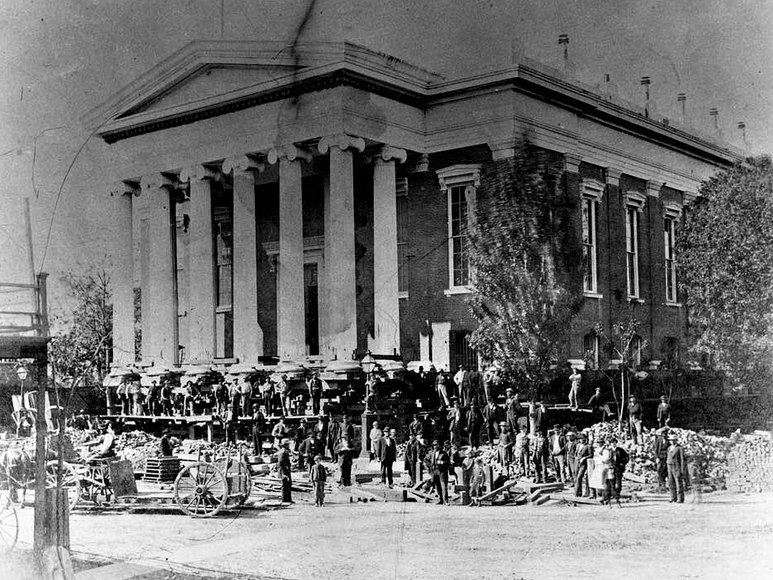
1855 Sacramento Courthouse and Former California State Capitol building in 1870, being raised 15 feet

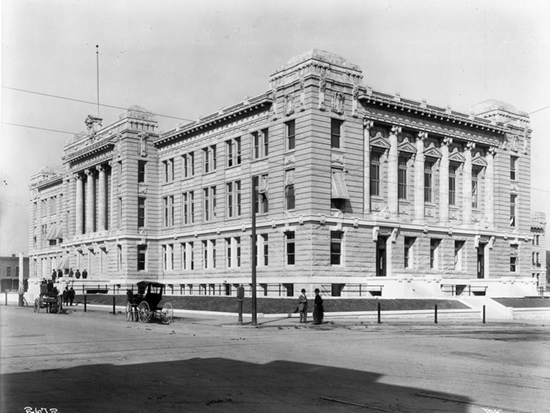
The 1910 Sacramento Courthouse, and Sacramento County Office Building, that replaced the 1855 Sacramento Courthouse.

Sacramento First Courthouse also, Former California State Capitol site, is a historical site in Sacramento, California. The Courthouse was also the first and second California State Capitol. The site is California Historical Landmark No. 869, registered on January 11, 1974. At the northwest corner of 7th Street and I Street, 651 I Street, Sacramento was a building that served as California's State Capitol. The first period was January 16, 1852 to May 4, 1852, and the second period was from March 1, 1854, to May 15, 1854, with the California State Legislature third and fifth sessions. The 651 I Street building was the Sacramento County courthouse. The site of the former California State Capitol - Sacramento County courthouse is now the Main Sacramento County Jail built in 1989. A California Historical marker was placed at the site in 2007 by California State Parks working with the Sacramento Trust for Historic Preservation.

== History ==
- Sacramento First Courthouse 1851:

The Sacramento First Courthouse was built in 1851. In 1852 the State Capitol moved to 7th Street and I Street Courthouse in Sacramento. The City of Sacramento offered the use of space in the Sacramento County's courthouse for the State Capitol. On July 13, 1854, the old wooden courthouse and parts of Sacramento burnt to the ground in a large fire.

- Sacramento Second Courthouse 1855:

On the site of the burnt Courthouse, a new Sacramento County Courthouse was built by David Farquharson (1817-1906) in just 6 months. The new building was the State Capitol from March 1, 1854, to May 15, 1854, with large Greek columns in the front. The new Sacramento County Courthouse construction started September 1854 and was completed in January 1855. In 1870 the city raised the Sacramento County Courthouse as part of a program to stop flooding from the American River and Sacramento River. Workers used 400 jack screws to raise the building. Turton and Knox Company was awarded the contract to raise the building 15 feet. The city had a 13-year program in the 1860s and 1870s, to raise the buildings and streets in Sacramento to stop the flooding problem in the city.

- Sacramento Third Courthouse 1910:

In 1910, a third 651 I Street courthouse was built of stone. The 1910 Sacramento Courthouse was a three-story granite and marble building and was also the Sacramento County offices. The 1910 Sacramento Courthouse was abandoned in 1965, when the county moved to a modern building. The 1910 building was demolished in 1970, and a new county jail opened on the site in 1989.

- Sacramento Fourth Courthouse 1965:

Gordon D. Schaber Sacramento County Courthouse was built in 1965 at 720 9th Street, Sacramento and is the current County courthouse.

=== California State Capitols ===
California State Capitols:

- Royal Presidio Chapel at 500 Church Street Monterey Capitol from 1776 to 1849. The original building has survived. Royal Presidio Chapel is California Historical Landmark #105. The State of California held the California Constitutional Convention at Colton Hall, California Historical Landmark #126.
- A San Jose two-story adobe hotel that was at 150 South Market Street, San Jose, Capitol from 1849 to 1851. The Senate met on the first floor and the Assembly met on the second floor. An 1853 fire destroyed the San Jose Capitol Building; the site is now a Fairmont Hotel. Site is California Historical Landmark #461.
- The 1851 Sacramento County Courthouse at 651 I Street, from January 16, 1852, to May 4, 1852. Site is California Historical Landmark #869. On July 13, 1854, the courthouse burnt to the ground in a large fire.
- The Vallejo California State Capitol was in Vallejo, California in a wooden two-story building, with a half set basement at 300 York Street Vallejo, Capitol from May 4, 1852, to February 4, 1853. General Mariano Guadalupe Vallejo (1807-1890) had offered the site. On August 20, 1859, hay stored in the basement caught fire; the building was lost. Site is now a parking lot. Site is California Historical Landmark #574.
- Fischer-Hanlon House, Benicia, California, Capitol from February 3, 1853, to February 24, 1854. Site is California Historical Landmark #153.
- Sacramento County Courthouse 651 I Street, Capitol from March 1, 1854, to May 15, 1854.
- The San Francisco neo-classical, three-story building built in 1854, the Merchants’ Exchange Building at Battery and Washington Streets, in San Francisco was used as the Capitol in 1862. Used from January 24, 1862, to May 15, 1862. The 1854 building was lost in the 1906 earthquake. Capitol moved to San Francisco for one year due to the Great Flood of 1862 in Sacramento.
- Parts of the Capitol were at the 1855 Sacramento County Courthouse from 1863 to 1869. Site is now Sacramento County Jail.
- California State Capitol at 10th Street and L Street, Sacramento from 1869 to current. Parts of the Capitol moved in starting in 1863, as construction started in 1861 and was not fully completed till 1874. Site is California Historical Landmark #872.

== California State Capitol Gallery ==
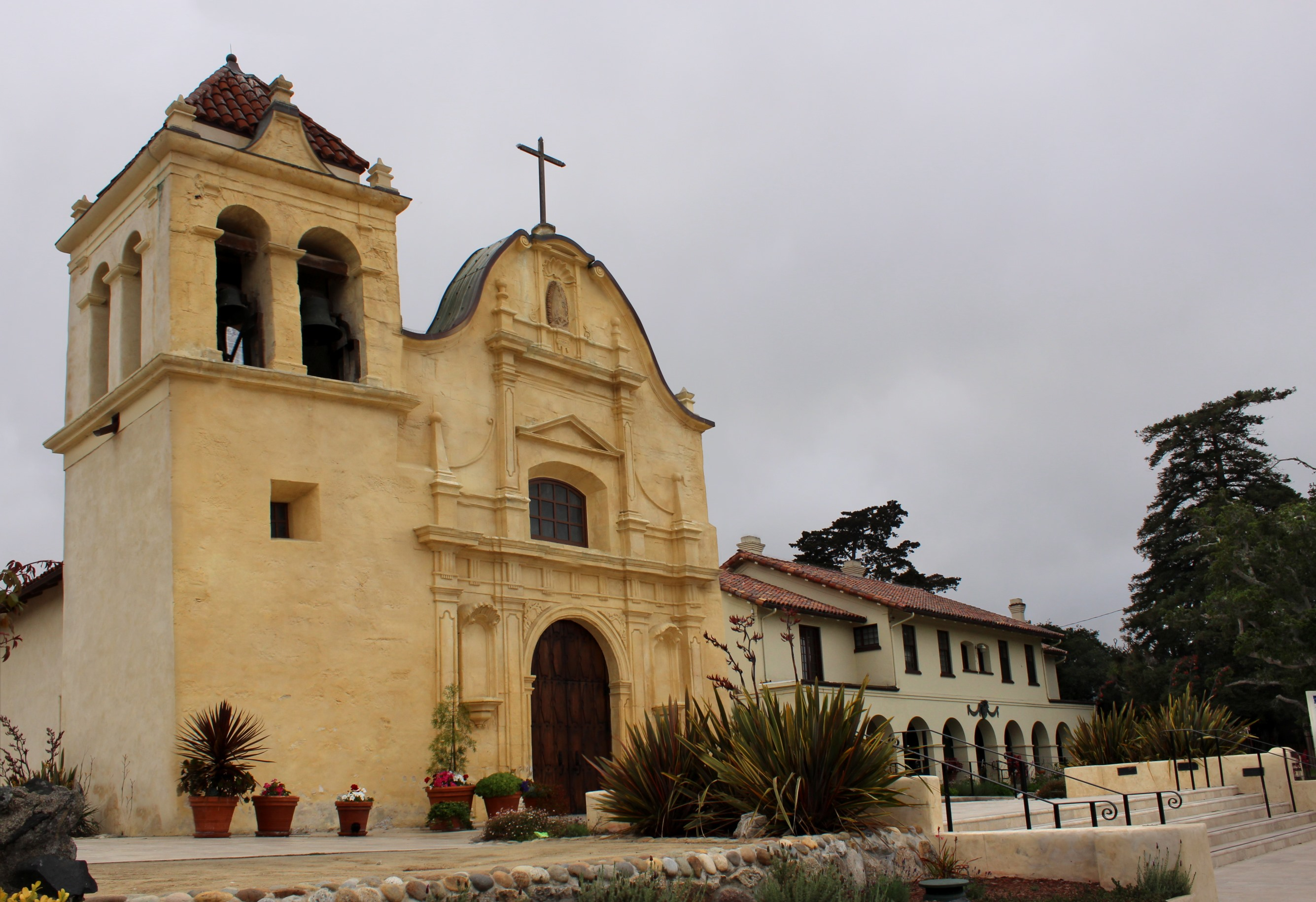
Royal Presidio Chapel, State Capitol from 1776 to 1849.

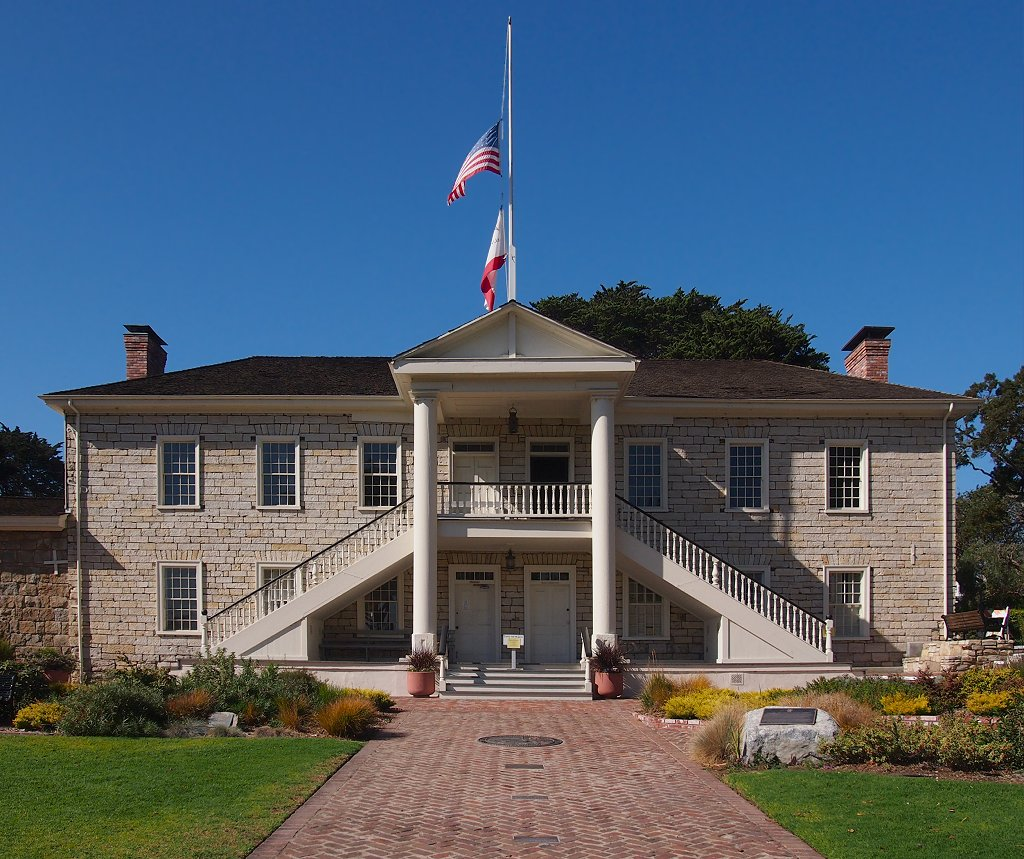
Colton Hall, State of California held the 1849 California Constitutional Convention.

State Capitol in San Jose from 1849 to 1851.

Capitol in Vallejo from 1851 to 1852.

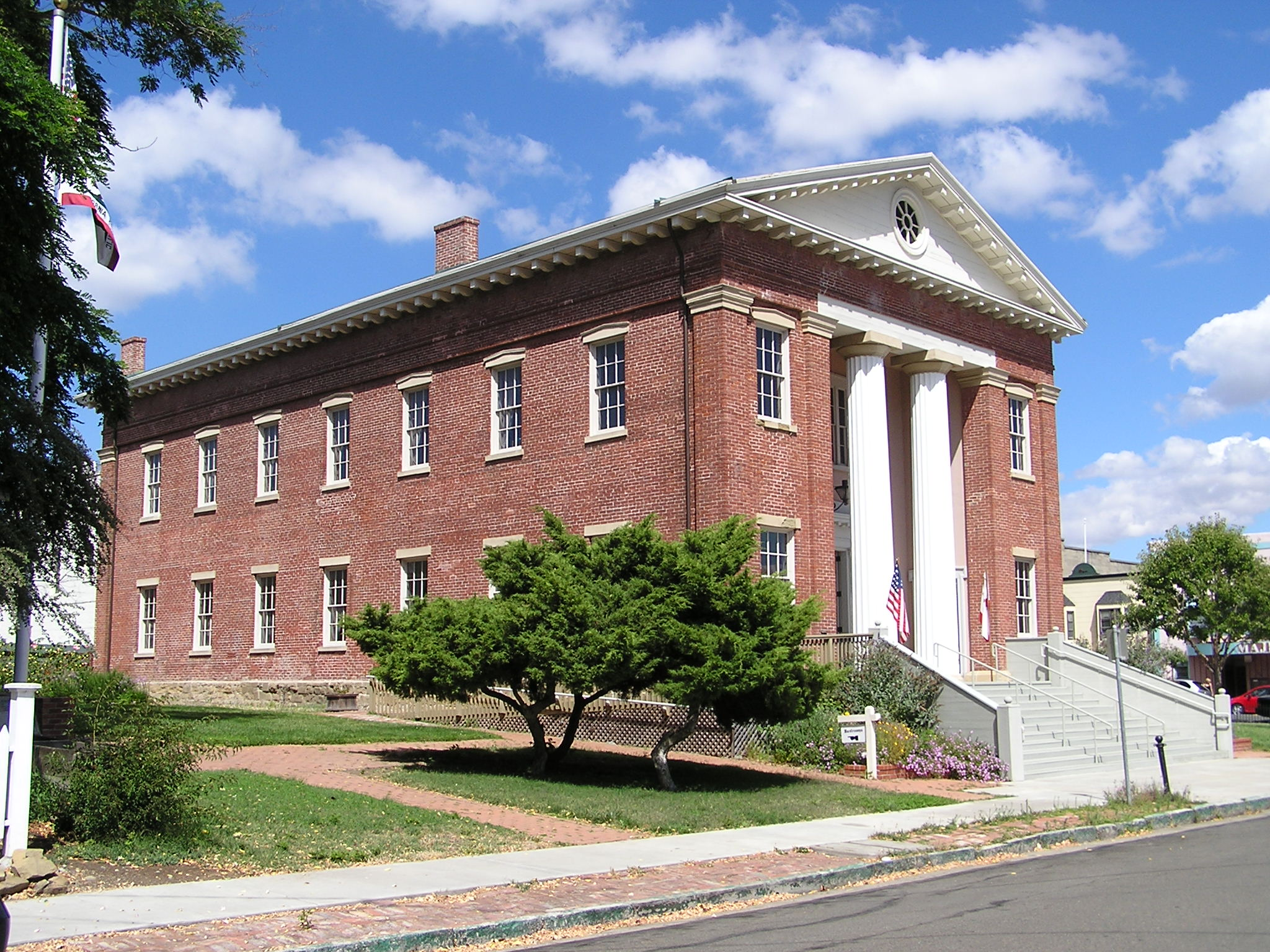
Benicia State Capitol from 1853 to 1854.

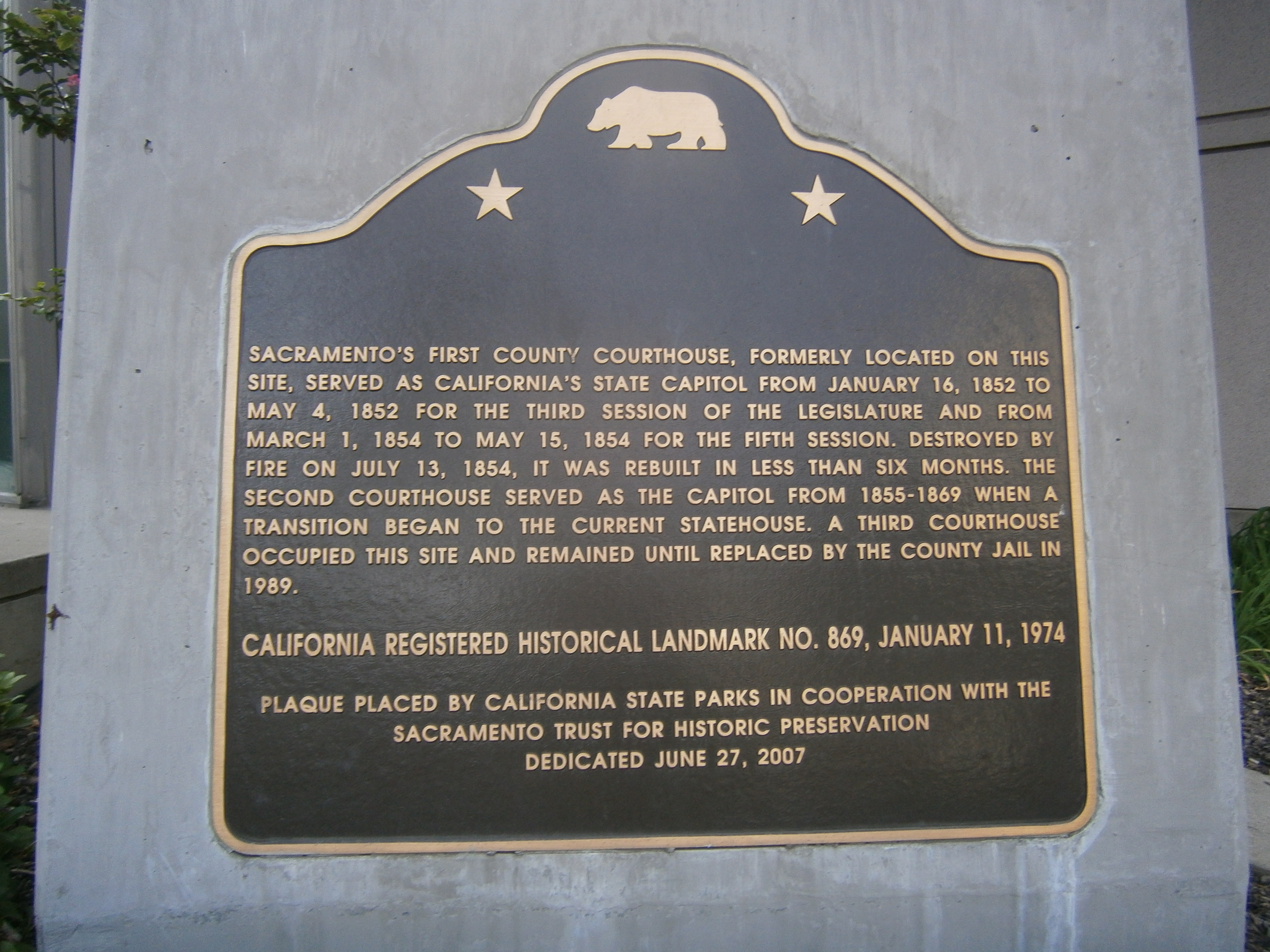
First and Second State Capitols, at the Sacramento Courthouse. California Historical Landmark marker #869, State Capitol 1852, 1854 and parts from 1863 to 1869.

The 1854 Merchants’ Exchange Building in San Francisco, State Capitol in 1862.

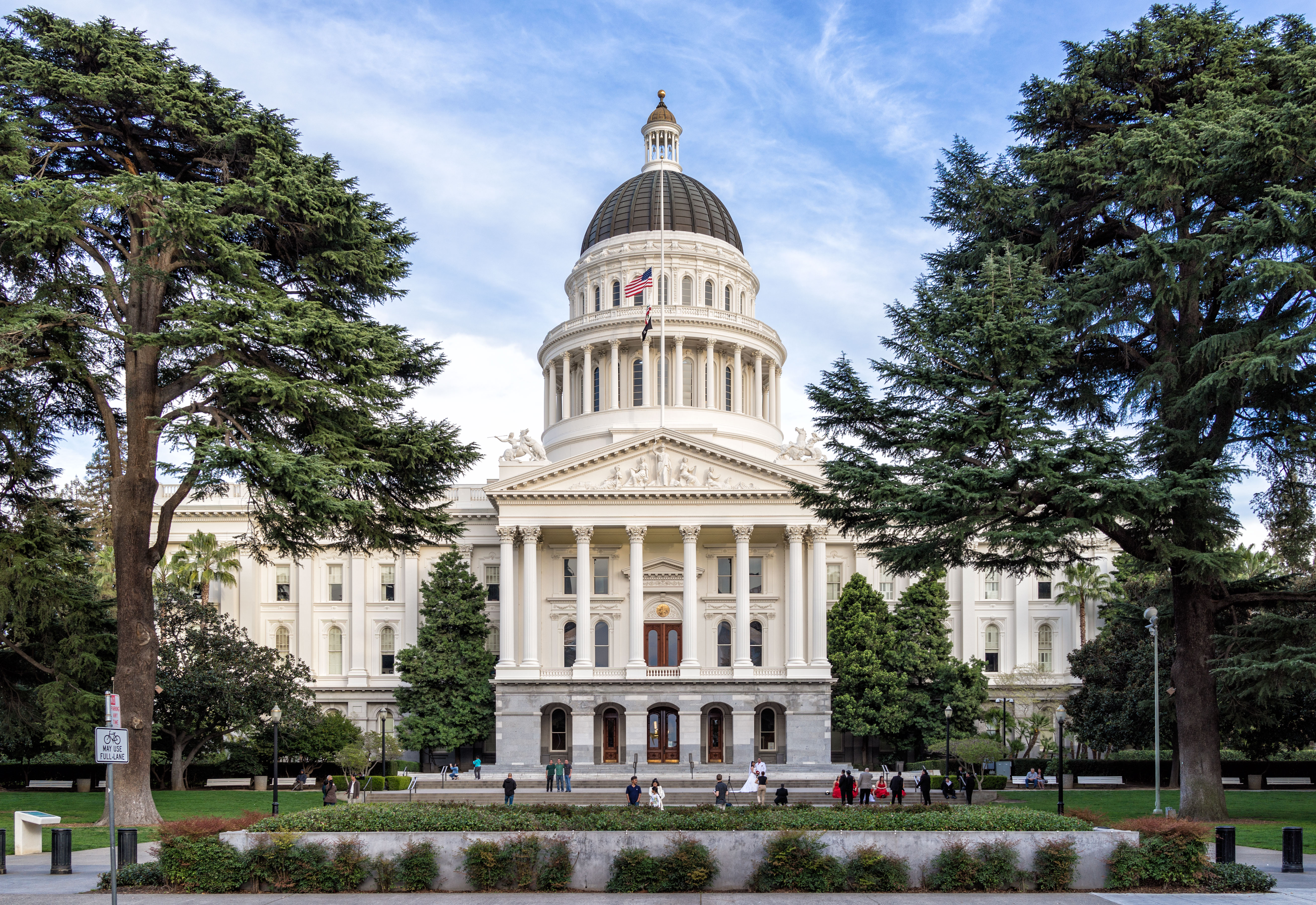
Current California State Capitol, starting in 1869.

== See also ==
- California Historical Landmarks in Sacramento County
- Adams and Company Building
- B.F. Hastings Bank Building
