= Murphy's Corral =

Historical Landmark in Elk Grove, United States

Site of Murphy's Ranch
- First Bear Flag of California; June 14 – July 9, 1846

- Location within California Location within the United States
- 38.372°N 121.359°W
- Location: West Stockton Blvd; Elk Grove, California

History
- Built: 1846

California Historical Landmark
- Designated: May 11, 1959
- Reference no.: 680

Murphy's Ranch, also called Murphy's Corral, is a historical site in Elk Grove, Sacramento County, California. The site of Murphy's Ranch is a California Historical Landmark No. 680 listed on May 11, 1959. At Murphy's Ranch on June 10, 1846, was the start of the Bear Flag Revolt.

== History ==
American pioneer and mountain man, Ezekial Merritt, was the leader of a group of about 12 pioneers and settlers, that were able to overpower the troops of Lieutenant Francisco Arce and took a large number of Mexican soldiers horses that were in the corral of the Murphy Ranch. The soldiers were taking the horses to Mexican troops in San Jose's Mission Santa Clara from Mission San Rafael. The Mexican soldiers had stop for the night to rest the horses. Ezekial Merritt group was called the Bear Flaggers. The next main event in the Bear Flag Rebellion was on June 14, 1846, in Sonoma, the taking of the Mexican administrative capital. Thus the founding of the California Republic that lasted from June 14, 1846, to July 9, 1846. Americans Independence declared from Mexico on June 14, 1846, and the Americans occupied Sonoma July 9, 1846. The arrival of United States Navy ships with leader John D. Sloat on July 10, ended the California Republic as Sloat claimed California for the United States. The arrival John C. Frémont and Robert F. Stockton, also ended the short lived California Republic. For his actions and bravery Frémont promoted Ezekial Merritt to Captain of the California Battalion, a job he manager poorly.

== Martin Murphy ==
Martin Murphy Jr. (1807–1884) founder of Murphy ranch and Sunnyvale, California

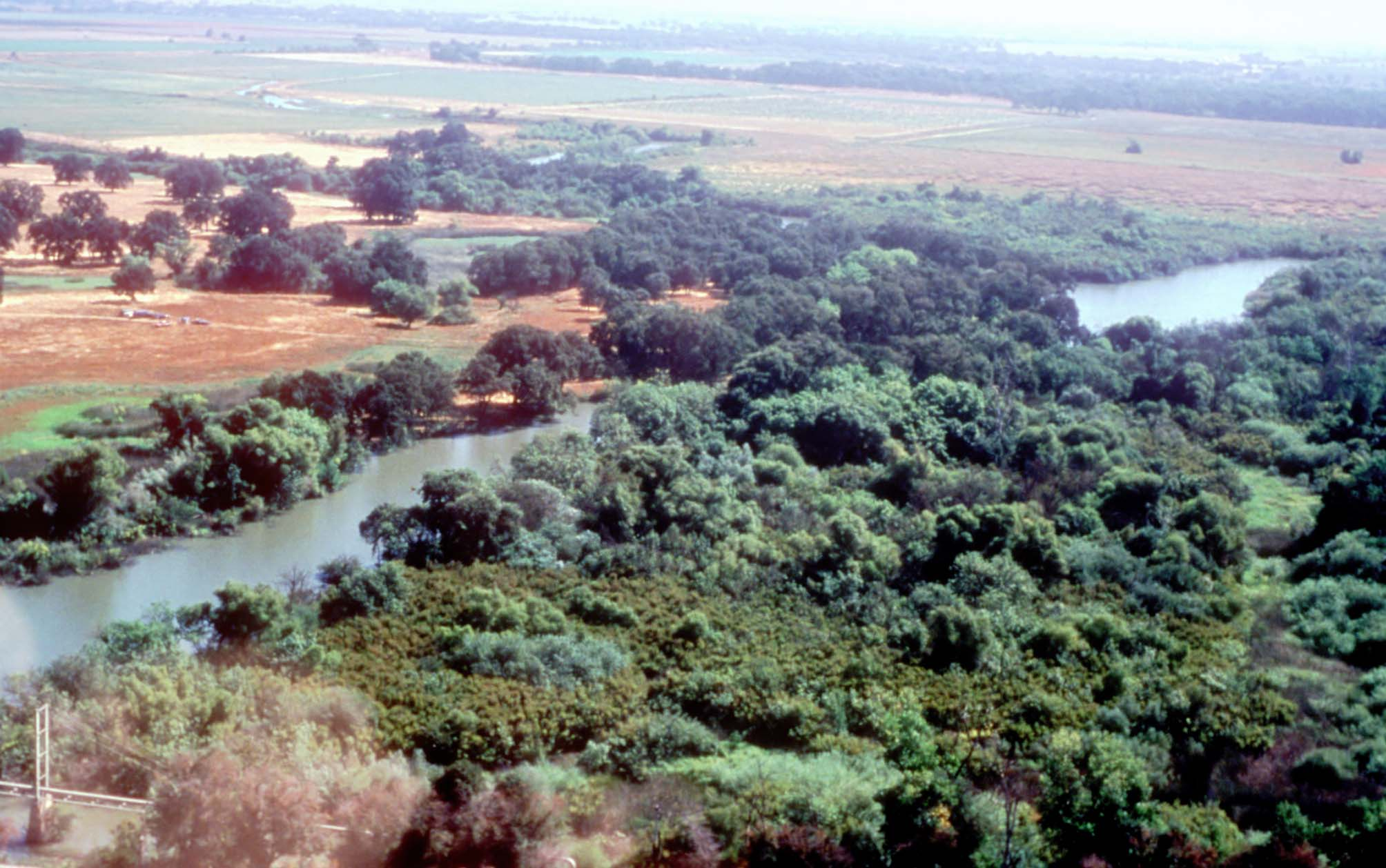
Cosumnes River near Murphy Ranch

The Murphy ranch was owned by Martin Murphy Jr. (1807–1884), located north of the Cosumnes River in Elk Grove. Murphy's Ranch was near the Monterey Trail, it led from New Helvetia (later called Sutter's Fort) to Monterey the Mexican capital in California.

Murphy was in a wagon train that was the first to cross the Sierras in 1844. The wagon train was made up of the Stephenson family, Townsend family and the Murphy family. The Stephens–Townsend–Murphy Party wagon train used strong oxen to pull the covered wagons. In 1849 Murphy Jr. moved to the San Francisco Bay Area. Martin Murphy Jr founded what is today called city of Sunnyvale and started a wheat farm and ranch, named Bay View. At the Sunnyvale Heritage Park Museum is a copy of his home.

Murphy's father, Martin Murphy Sr., (1785–1865) is known for founding the town of San Martin South of San Jose. Martin Murphy Sr. was born in Ferns, Ireland. Murphys Sr.'s sons John Marion Murphy and Daniel Martin Murphy found gold and started a mining town called Murphys, California, now California Historical Landmark no. 275.

== Historical marker ==
There are a number of historical markers in California about the Murphy Family's impact on Murphy California. The Santa Clara County Parks Department has a marker in San Martin, California at 2080 East San Martin Avenue.
The Pioneering Murphy Family marker reads:

In 1844, Martin Murphy Sr. brought his large, Irish family across the continent in the Stephens-Murphy-Townsend overland part. Their determination, optimism and close family bonds helped them cross rugged terrain and become founders of early Santa Clara Valley. In 1846, Martin Murphy, Sr. made his way to Santa Clara Valley and established his homestead. For $1500 he purchased the 9000-acre Rancho Ojo del Agua de la Coche, named for its many springs. Murphy’s ranch and hospitality created a welcome resting place for many travelers. Later the town of San Martin would grow up around the ranch and be named in honor of Murphy’s patron saint. Murphy’s sons, John and Daniel, struck gold in the Sierras in 1849, but made their fortunes selling dry goods to the miners. The town they established bears the family name – Murphys. John became a prominent San Jose citizen, as treasurer, coroner, and sheriff for the newly formed County of Santa Clara. In 1854, Daniel took over the operation of Murphy Sr.'s ranch. He began purchasing cattle and land. At the time of his death in 1881, Dan’s landholdings in California, Nevada, New Mexico and Arizona made him perhaps the largest landowner on the Pacific Coast. The Murphy clan’s pioneering spirit continued as they helped establish Santa Clara University, College of Notre Dame and the cities of San Martin, Morgan Hill, San Jose and Sunnyvale. After Dan Murphy died his property was subdivided and changed hands several times. The Harvey Bear family bought property to graze cattle. In 1997, the Bear family sold 4,445-acres to the Santa Clara Parks and Recreation Department. The former Ojo del Agua Rancho lands have been added to Coyote Lake-Harvey Bear Ranch County Park. The historic Murphy homestead, pictured at left, once stood on the Bear Ranch property. Today, cattle still graze the parklands to fight weeds and reduce fire danger.

—

== See also ==
- Bernard D. Murphy
- California Historical Landmarks in Sacramento County
- Adams and Company Building
