= Niels Henry Sonne =

- Born: Niels Henry Sonne; December 21, 1907; New York City, New York
- Died: April 29, 1994 (aged 86); Princeton, N.J.
- Education: Columbia University (BA, PhD)
- Occupations: Librarian, rare book curator
- Known for: Librarian, General Theological Seminary
- Spouse: Grace Sonne

Niels Henry Sonne (1907–1994) was a noted librarian, a rare book curator, and expert on the Gutenberg Bible. He was born in New York City and received his bachelor's degree from Columbia University in 1930, and his doctorate in 1939.

Liberal Kentucky, originally written as Sonne's Ph.D. thesis, was published by Columbia University Press in 1939, and reprinted by the University Press of Kentucky in 1968. The book deals with the development of liberal thought in Kentucky and relates particularly to the growth of Transylvania University in Lexington, Kentucky. Sonne was employed for most of his career as a rare book librarian at the General Theological Seminary in New York City.

== Gutenberg Bible ==
Sonne was an expert on the Gutenberg Bible's history and provenance. "A specialist on the Gutenberg Bible, Dr. [Niels H. Sonne] retired as the seminary's librarian in 1976 after 26 years." A copy held by the General Theological Seminary was studied, and found to have a forged page. An anonymous donor to the seminary gave an original page from an imperfect copy of the Bible, thus becoming the first imperfect copy of the Gutenberg Bible to be made whole again.

== General Theological Seminary Library ==
For many years, Sonne was the head librarian of the General Theological Seminary. This library is considered America's oldest Episcopal seminary library.

He wrote several articles on the history and contributions of the library. and was a widely respected authority on the early manuscript copies of the Latin Bible and church history.

== Church history ==
Sonne was an authority on Episcopal church history, and wrote articles on early Anglican prayer books held by the library, early American Anglican missionaries and liturgy.

== Bibliography ==
- Niels H. Sonne, Librarian, 86. New York, N.Y.: s.n, 1994. Photocopy (enlarged) of obituary from The New York Times, 30 April 1994.
- Schwenke, Paul, and Niels H. Sonne. Johannes Gutenbergs Zweiundvierzigzeilige Bibel: Ergänzungsband Zur Faksimile-Ausgabe = Johann Gutenberg's 42 Line Bible: Supplementary Volume to the Facsimile Edition. [S.l.]: N.H. Sonne, 1981. Issued as a xerox reproduced typescript. 145 pages.
- Schwenke, Paul, and Niels H. Sonne. Johann Gutenberg's 42 Line Bible: Supplementary Volume to the Facsimile Edition. [S.l.]: N.H. Sonne, 1981. "Private translation in typescript and xerox reproduction"—Leaf ii. Translation of Johannes Gutenbergs zweiundvierzigzeilige Bibel. 145 pages.
- Sonne, Niels H. Physical Analysis of the General Theological Seminary Gutenberg Bible, June 1975. 1975. 100 pages.
- Sonne, Niels H. "The Night Before Christmas"—Who Wrote It? S.l: s.n, 1972. Reprinted from The Historical magazine of the Protestant Episcopal Church, vol. 41, no. 4, pages 373-380.
- Sonne, Niels H. The Gutenberg Bible and the General Theological Seminary 1950-1970. New York: General Theological Seminary, 1970. Bulletin of the General Theological Seminary, v. 56, no. 1 (Feb. 1970), pages 11–18.
- Sonne, Niels H. Liberal Kentucky, 1780-1828. Lexington: Univ. of Kentucky Pr, 1968.
- Sonne, Niels H., and Charles L. Taylor. [Survey of the St. Mark's Library]. 1966. Looseleaf. Constitutes section 10 of an institutional self-study made by the General Theological Seminary for Charles L. Taylor in preparation for Ministry for tomorrow, a survey of theological education in the Episcopal Church published in 1967 as a report of the Church's Special Committee on Theological Education. 100 pages.
- Weitzel, Rolf, Rolf Weitzel, and Niels H. Sonne. The German National Bibliographies: An Introduction to Their Utilization. New York, N.Y.: [s.n.], 1966. Deutschen nationalen Bibliographien. 20 pages.
- Sonne, Niels H. The Gutenberg Bible of the General Theological Seminary. New York, N.Y.: St. Mark's Library, 1965.
- Sonne, Niels H. 1962. "A Multipurpose Building Provides a New Home for America's Oldest Episcopal Seminary Library". Library Journal. 87, no. 1, pages 35–37.
- Sonne, Niels H. Current Trends in Theological Libraries. Urbana, Ill: University of Illinois Graduate School of Library Science], 1960. Library Trends, v. 9, no. 2, Oct., 1960, pages 131-283.
- Sonne, Niels H. [History of the Library of the General Theological Seminary in the 19th Century]. 1960. Probably by Niels H. Sonne. Incomplete. 19 leaves.
- Sonne, Niels H. Library Receives Seabury Manuscripts. New York: Bulletin of the General Theological Seminary, 1959. Reprinted from: Bulletin of the General Theological Seminary, vol. 45, no. 1 (February, 1959), pages 2–5.
- Sonne, Niels H., and Edward. Library Acquires Second Prayer Book of Edward VI, 1522. New York: Bulletin of the General Theological Seminary, 1959. Reprint from: Bulletin of the General Theological Seminary (February 1959), pages 9–12.
- Sonne, Niels H. Bibliographical Materials on the Episcopal Church. New York: General Theological Seminary, 1957. Previously published in "Bulletin of the General Theological Seminary" Vol. xliii, no. 1, section 2 (Feb., 1957) and "Religion in life", Abingdon Press, New York and Nashville.
- Sonne, Niels H. 1957. "The Library, a Decade of Progress". Bulletin of the General Theological Seminary. 45, no. 5, pages 15–21.
- Sonne, Niels H. The Story of the Gutenberg Bible. New York, N.Y.: General Theological Seminary, 1955. Gutenberg Bible of the General Theological Seminary. Cover title: The Gutenberg Bible of the General Theological Seminary.
- Sonne, Niels H. The Library of the General Theological Seminary: A Report for the Special Meeting of the Trustees, November 14 to 15, 1955. New York: s.n, 1955. Presumably by Niels H. Sonne, librarian of the seminary. pages.
- Wemmer, Frederick, et al. Frederick Wemmer Research on Founding of Grace Church. 1955. Frederick Wemmer's research during 1955-1956 into the founding date of Grace Church in Sacramento, done for the Pioneer Congregational Church who was planning on installing a plaque claiming itself as Sacramento's first church. This research contains quotes from various sources, correspondence with religious historians and archives, and his final report to the Sacramento Historic Landmarks Commission. Authors and Contributors: Frederick Wemmer; Nelson R Burr; Clifford Merrill Drury; Muriel H Gill; Pauline B Hickmott; Frank J Klingberg; William Wilson Manross; Edward L Parsons; Guy Emery Shipler; Niels H Sonne; Kathryn M Taylor; Irene L Ver Mehr; Rudolph Ver Mehr; William W Winn. File folder.
- Sonne, Niels H. America's Oldest Episcopal Seminary Library and the Needs It Serves. New York?: s.n, 1953. Cover title: The library of the General Theological Seminary and the needs it serves. Edited by Niels H. Sonne. Sketch of General Seminary buildings on endpapers. 24 pages.
- American Theological Library Association, and Niels H. Sonne. A Bibliography of Post-Graduate Masters' Theses in Religion. Chicago: Distributed by American Library Association], 1951. Prepared by the Committee on a Master List of Research Studies in Religion. Niels H. Sonne, editor.
- Sonne, Niels H. John Pintard and the Early Years of the General Theological Seminary Library. New York: s.n.], 1961. Reprinted with revisions from the Bulletin of the General Theological Seminary, v. 47, no. 1 (February, 1961).
- General Theological Seminary (New York, N.Y.), and Niels H. Sonne. New Book List. 1948.
- Sonne, Niels Henry. 1942. "George Keith, 1638–1716, By Mrs E. W. Kirby. New York: Appleton-Century, 1942. Vi, 177 Pages." Church History. 11, no. 04. ISSN 0009-6407.
- Sonne, Niels Henry, and Clarence E. Carter. 1941. "Review of The Territorial Papers of the United States: The Territory of Mississippi, 1798-1817. Vols. V and VI". Pennsylvania Magazine of History and Biography. 65, no. 1: 100-102.
- Sonne, Niels H. Liberal Kentucky, 1780-1828: Diss. Columbia Univ. 1939.
- Sonne, Niels H. Manuscripts Dealing with the GTS Gutenberg Bible. 1916.
