= What Cheer House (Sacramento, California) =

Historical Landmark in Sacramento, United States

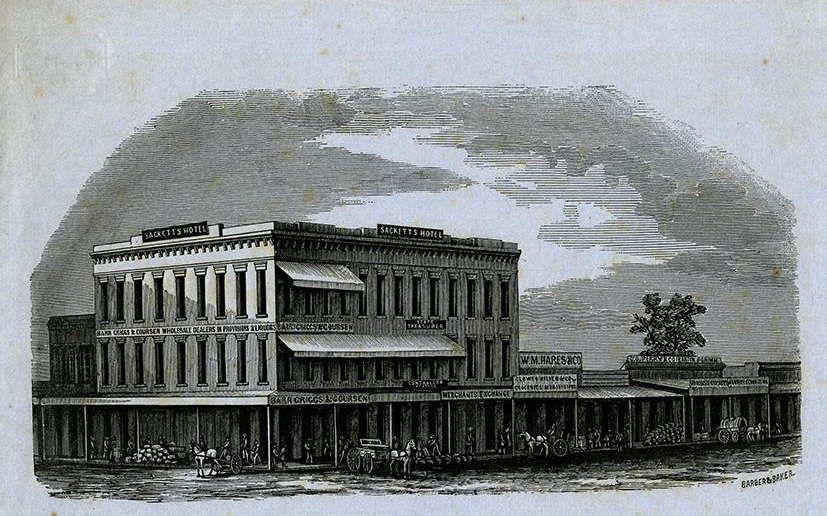
- The What Cheer House as the Sackett Hotel

- Location within California Location within the United States
- 38.5823°N 121.5058°W
- Location: 102 K Street; Sacramento, California

History
- Built: 1853

California Historical Landmark
- Designated: May 22, 1957
- Reference no.: 597

What Cheer House, also at times called the Sackett Hotel and Grand Hotel, is a historical building in Sacramento, California. What Cheer House is a California Historical Landmark No. 597 listed on May 22, 1957. The What Cheer House was first used as hotel, the Sackett Hotel. The What Cheer House was used for the California State offices in 1855. In the 1870s it was called the Grand Hotel. The What Cheer House is at the southeast corner of Front Street and K Street in Old Sacramento.

The What Cheer House supported the California Gold Rush Pioneers, it was built near the Sacramento waterfront and Central Pacific Railroad station. A Pioneer greeting was what cheer, partner?!, thus the What Cheer House name. After the California State offices moved out the What Cheer House became a warehouse for the Sacramento waterfront shipping. Since the What Cheer House has been: Stage Nine Entertainment Store, G.Willikers Toy Emporium, The Vault, California Clothiers, and the Old Fashioned Candy and Confectionery. The City of Sacramento had a 13-year program in the 1860s and 1870s, to raise the buildings and streets in Sacramento to stop the flooding problem in the city, like the Great Flood of 1862. The What Cheer House was raised 15 feet (4.6 m), stopping flooding by the Sacramento River and American River. By the later 1940s and early 1950s What Cheer House was showing her age due to lack of renovation. By 1965 the City of Sacramento set up a plan to renovated and modernize not only the What Cheer House, but much of Old Sacramento. Stage Nine Entertainment, Inc. purchased the What Cheer House in the 1990s.

== See also ==
- California Historical Landmarks in Sacramento County
- Adams and Company Building
