= Lady Adams Building =

Historical landmark in Sacramento, United States

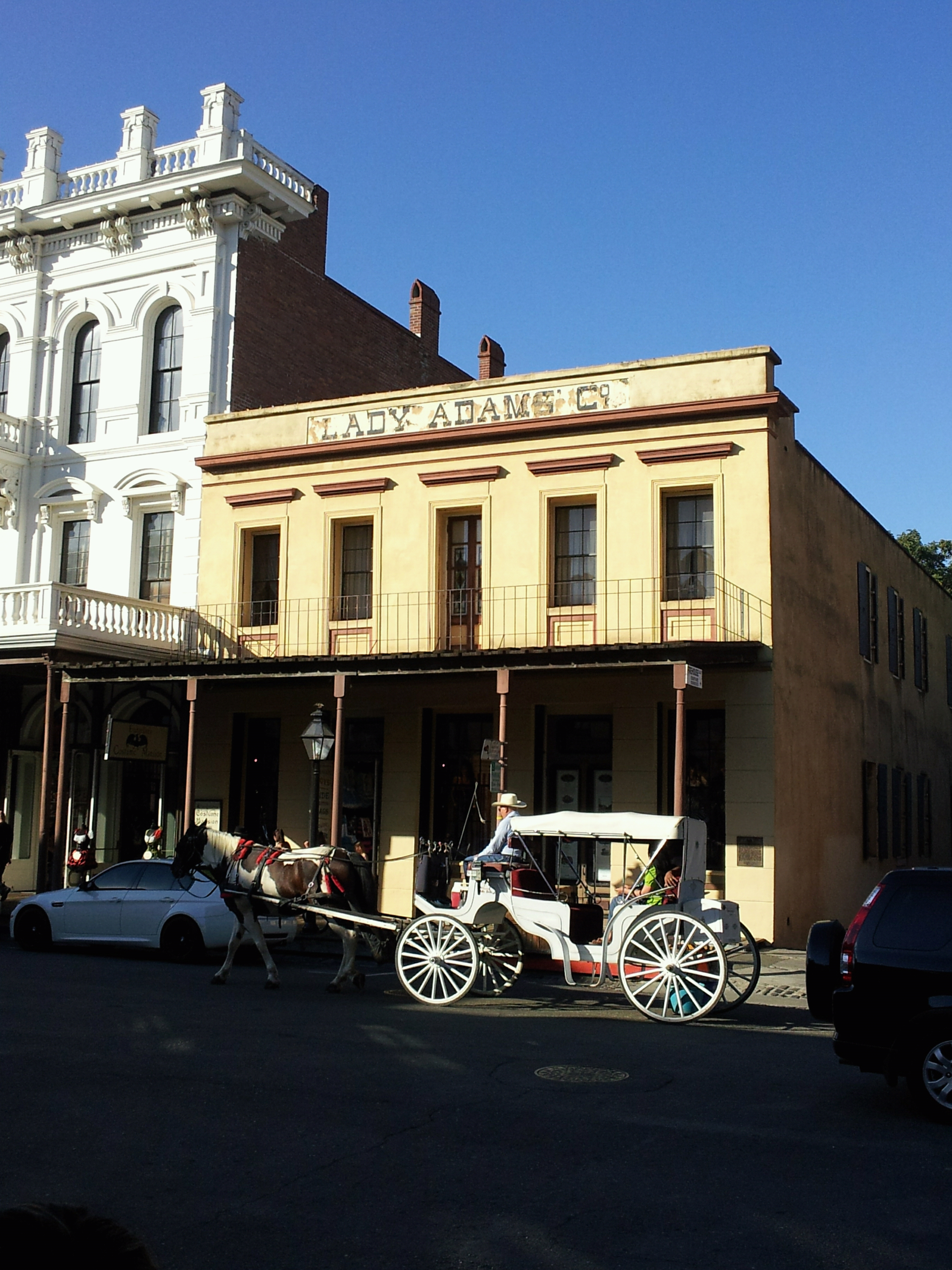

- Location within California Location within the United States
- 38.5823°N 121.5053°W
- Location: 113 K Street; Sacramento, California

History
- Built: 1852

Site notes
- Architect: Julius Fiedler
- Architectural style: Brick two-story

California Historical Landmark
- Designated: May 22, 1957
- Reference no.: 603

Lady Adams Building is a historical building in Sacramento, California. It is California Historical Landmark No. 603. Lady Adams Building was built in 1852 for $29,000 (Note: equivalent to $1.12 million in 2025 adjusted for inflation) and opened as a store and office building; it is the oldest building in Old Sacramento. The store specialized in goods from the East Coast of the United States that sailed through the Strait of Magellan in the brigantine sailing ship, Lady Adams. The building architect was Julius Fiedler. The building is at 113 K Street, Sacramento.

The Lady Adams Building was a wholesale and import house. Arriving on the Lady Adams in 1849, four immigrants from Germany set up the wholesale store. The wholesale store started by selling good off the ship Lady Adams at the Sacramento River docks as Lady Adams Mercantile Company starting in 1849 to support the California Gold Rush boom. Part of the ships went in to building the K Street Lady Adams Building. Lady Adams Mercantile Co. went bankruptcy in 1861. In 1861 it became the Fogus & Coghill grocery store. The city had a 13-year program in the 1860s and 1870s, to raise the buildings and streets in Sacramento to stop the flooding problem in the city, like the Great Flood of 1862. The Lady Adams Building was raised 15 feet in 1865. In 1868 it became the Mebius & Company Wholesale Grocers. For some year the building was vacant during part of the 1950s. The roof collapsed in 1970 from age but was repaired.

Since 1974, Evangeline’s Costume Mansion has occupied the Lady Adams building as well as the adjacent Howard House (built in the 1860s). In June 2025, Evangeline's was damaged by a fire in the Howard House portion of the business, but "(f)ire sprinklers had kicked in by the time firefighters arrived, helping keep the flames from spreading through the rest of the building as well as into other nearby businesses," as reported by the local CBS News affiliate.

== See also ==
- California Historical Landmarks in Sacramento County
- Adams and Company Building
- B.F. Hastings Bank Building
