= John Pintard =

American merchant and philanthropist (1759–1844)

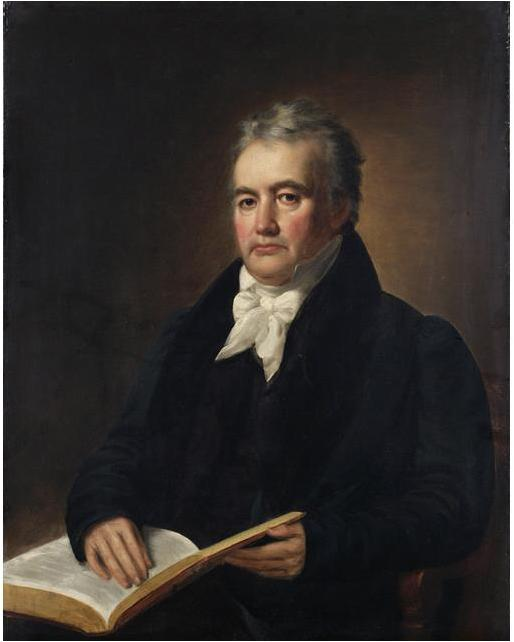
- Born: John Pintard, Jr. May 18, 1759; New York
- Died: June 21, 1844 (aged 85); New York
- Spouse: Elizabeth Brashear
- Parent(s): John Pintard, Sr. Mary Cannon
- Relatives: Antoine Pintard, ancestor

John Pintard Jr. (May 18, 1759 – June 21, 1844) was an American merchant and philanthropist. He cofounded the Massachusetts Historical Society and the New York Historical Society, served as Secretary of the New York Chamber of Commerce, and popularized the modern concept of Saint Nicholas as Santa Claus.

== Biography ==
He was a descendant of Antoine Pintard, a Huguenot from La Rochelle, France. He was orphaned when his mother died when he was "a fortnight old" and his father died when he was about eighteen months old. His father, John, was a seagoing merchant, and his mother was Mary Cannon. He was raised by his uncle, Lewis Pintard, and attended grammar school under the Reverend Leonard Cutting at Hempstead, New York.

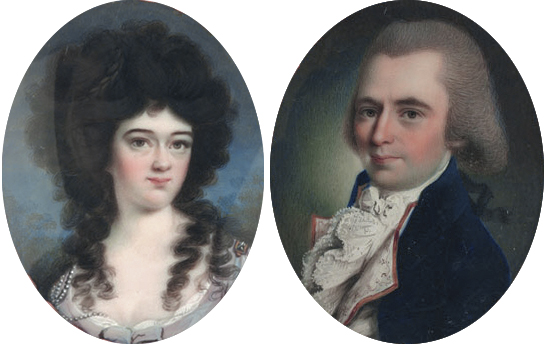
John and Elizabeth Pintard (John Ramage, 1787)

He attended the College at New Jersey (which later became Princeton University), but left school to join the patriot forces when the British arrived at New York. He went on various expeditions to harass the enemy. He returned to school briefly and received the degree of A.B. in 1776. He served as deputy commissary of prisoners at New York under his uncle Lewis. His duties were to examine and relieve the wants of the prisoners. On November 12, 1784, he married Elizabeth Brashear, daughter of Colonel Abraham Brashear of Paramus, New Jersey.

Pintard had inherited a legacy from his maternal grandfather, John Cannon, and this allowed him to go into the China and East India trade. Like his father and his grandfather before him, John served as an alderman to the City of New York. Pintard drafted the constitution of the Tammany Society, developed the titles of the members, and urged the canonization of Christopher Columbus within the society. The society was renamed The Society of St. Tammany or Columbian Order in the City of New York in the late 1780 or early 1790s but removed the canonization process and names from its title in 1792. He was rated as one of New York's most successful and prosperous merchants when in 1792 he lost his fortune by engaging with William Duer in a scheme to fund the national debt. He had personally endorsed notes for over a million dollars and was imprisoned for the debt. John Pintard resided in Newark, New Jersey for eight years and declared bankruptcy in New York. He never recovered his old fortune, but his position and respect in the community enabled him to contribute generously to the projects he sponsored.

Coat of Arms of John Pintard

In 1803, John Pintard went to New Orleans to seek his fortune but decided not to settle there. He filed a very favorable report of the French colony to Albert Gallatin, secretary of the treasury, and minister to France James Monroe, a relative by marriage to his wife's aunt. Pintard's report was instrumental in convincing Thomas Jefferson to purchase the Louisiana Territory. He served as first city inspector of New York City for many years after 1804, and was authorized by the corporation of New York to issue fractional notes during the War of 1812.

John was secretary of the Mutual Assurance Company from 1809 to 1829. From 1819 to 1829 he served as Secretary of the New York Chamber of Commerce. He served as treasurer of the Sailor's Snug Harbor from 1819 to 1823 and was instrumental in the purchase of the property on Staten Island where the home is now located. He also was a founder of the New York Historical Society and the Massachusetts Historical Society. John Pintard served as manager of the state lotteries and was first sagamore of the Tammany Society. He was also elected a member of the American Antiquarian Society in 1814.

In 1832 he was in New York City during the second cholera pandemic.

On February 19, 1805 he began the efforts which became the present free school system in New York. He was also active in the movement that resulted in the building and completion of the Erie Canal. John Pintard surveyed the plans for the streets and avenues in upper New York City. A deeply religious man, he was one of the chief supporters of the General Theological Seminary and helped found the American Bible Society, which he always called his "brat." He was vestryman for the Huguenot Church of New York City for thirty-four years and his translation of the Book of Common Prayer from English to French is still used today. In 1822, the degree of LL.D. was conferred on him by Allegheny College.

Pintard was an active Freemason, serving as Master for his Lodge in New York.

=== Saint Nicholas as Santa Claus ===
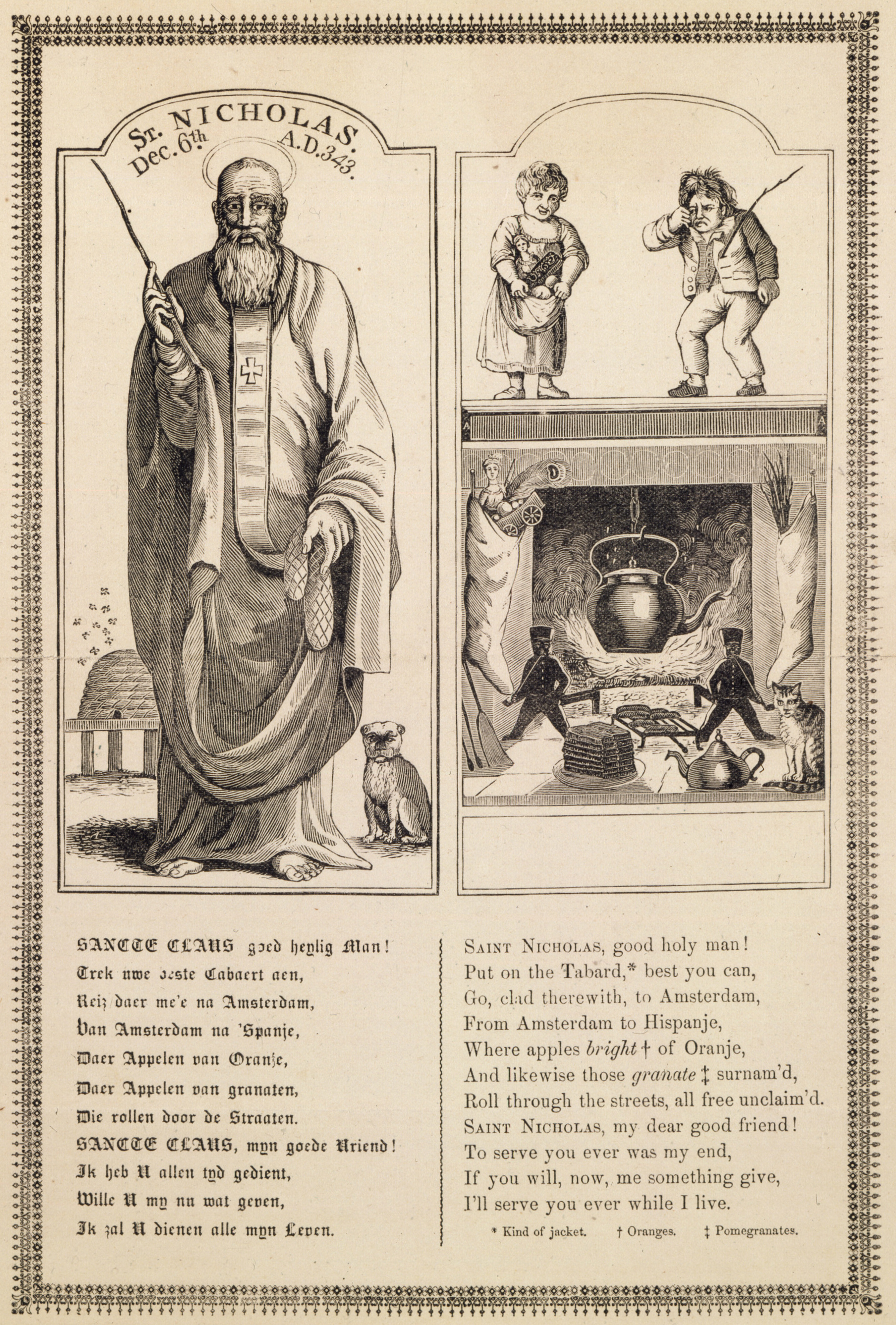
"Saint Nicholas" by John Pintard (1810)

Perhaps Pintard's greatest contribution to American society, however, was his role in establishing the modern popular conception of Santa Claus based upon the Dutch legend of Sinterklaas. His papers demonstrate that he personally observed the feast of Saint Nicholas in an era when such remembrances were still frequently considered "hagiolatry" in America and when almanacs of the day omitted reference to such a feast day. Protestants, he argued, unlike Catholics and even pagans, had systematically suppressed the kind of “religious festivals” at which “mechanics and laborers” could find officially sanctioned and organized “processions” that would allow them to release their “pent-up” energies in satisfying but orderly ways. To remedy this, he directed considerable energy toward constructing a renewed Winter holiday involving Saint Nicholas. His publication in 1810 of a pamphlet proposing Saint Nicholas as the patron saint of New York City, and Patron Saint of his newly established New York Historical Society became a theme just following his friend Washington Irving publishing A History of New York in 1809, (itself coming from Irving's January 25, 1808 article in Salmagundi magazine). Irving's publication being the first widely published record of Santa Claus as Saint Nicholas in New Amsterdam (old New York City), and Pintard lending gravitas to the cause of Saint Nicholas for many years to follow.

According to Dr. Niels Henry Sonne, former director of the library, John Pintard also was a patron of the library of the General Theological Seminary in New York, and helped establish their first collection of books.

Blind in his later years, he died at the home of his daughter, Louise, in New York on June 21, 1844.
