= Booth Company =

Historical Landmark in Sacramento, United States

Booth Company Building
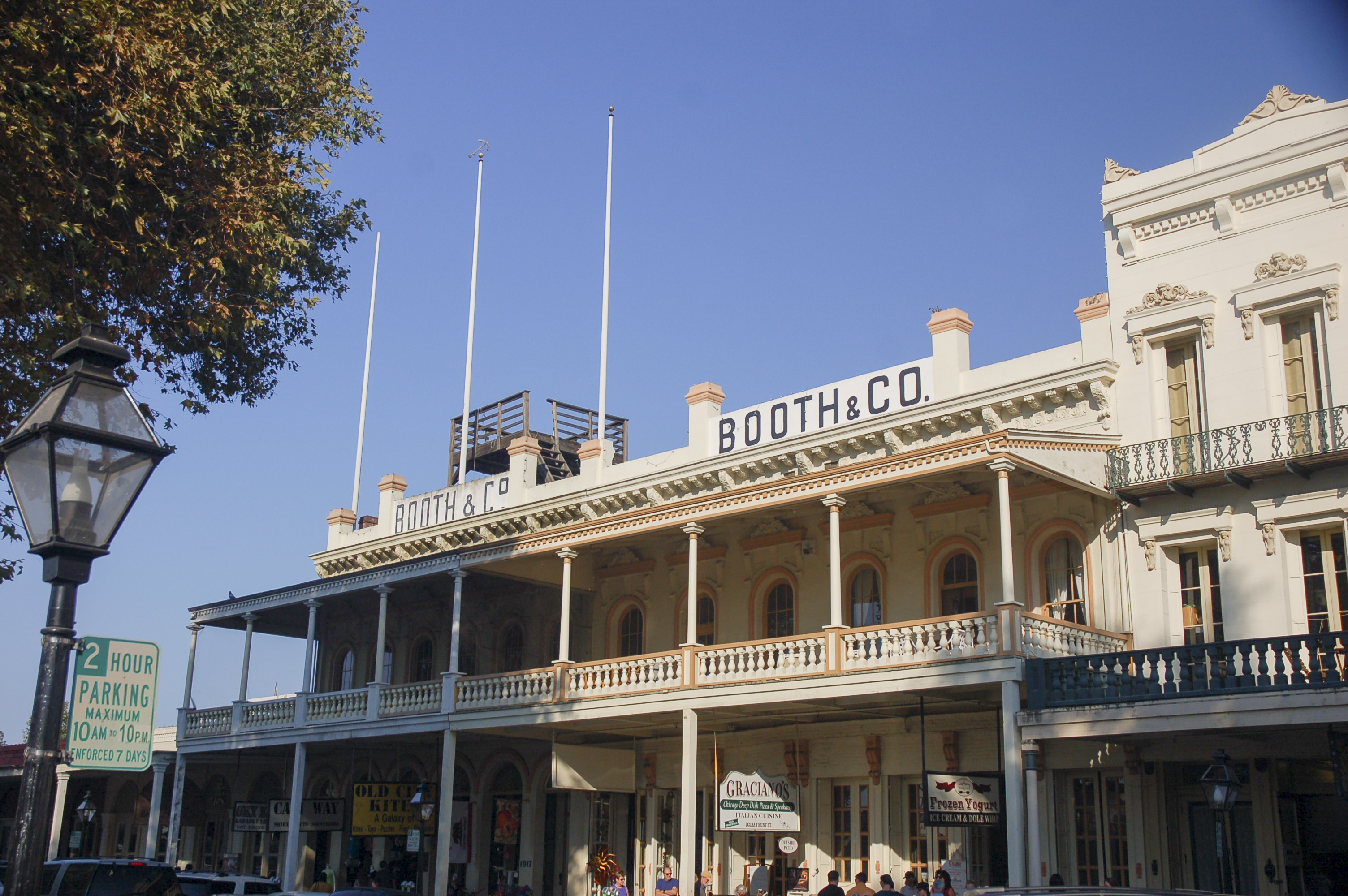
- Booth Company Building

- Location within California Location within the United States
- 38.5832°N 121.5054°W
- Location: 1019 Front Street Sacramento, California

History
- Built: 1850

California Historical Landmark
- Reference no.: 607

The Booth Company Building is a historic building in Sacramento, California. It is California Historical Landmark No. 607 and is located at 1019–1021 Front Street in Old Sacramento State Historic Park. Booth Company was opened by lawyer Newton Booth as a wholesale grocery store and general store. Booth had a platform built on the roof of the building from which his employees could signal ships coming into the Port of Sacramento, so he could get ahead of his competitors in buying goods. A historical plaque was placed in front of the Booth Company by the Native Sons of the Golden West.

Booth became a politician, and was the 11th governor of California from December 8, 1871, to February 27, 1875. Then he became a United States senator from California from March 4, 1875, to March 3, 1881. Booth's inaugural ball as governor of California was held in the ballroom on the second floor of the Booth Company Building. The Booth Company Building was used as the Booth's governor's mansion. The next governor's mansion is now the Governor's Mansion State Historic Park. After serving in United States Congress, he returned to his wholesale store in Sacramento. Part of the building was rented to George W. Chesley, also a wholesale grocer, till 1891.

== See also ==
- California Historical Landmarks in Sacramento County
