= California State Capitol (Vallejo, California) =

Historical place in Solano County, United States

Former Vallejo California State Capitol
- Vallejo California State Capitol in 1852

- Location within California Location within the United States
- 38.10007°N 122.2591°W
- Location: 300 York Street, Vallejo, California

History
- Built: 1852

California Historical Landmark
- Designated: April 1, 1957
- Reference no.: 574

From May 4, 1852, to February 4, 1853, a wooden, two-story building in Vallejo, California, served as the California State Capitol. The building had a half set basement and was located at 300 York Street. General Mariano Guadalupe Vallejo offered the site to the state government after the Sacramento First Courthouse, then the state capitol, burnt to the ground in large fire on July 13, 1854.

On February 3, 1853, the capitol moved to a building in Benicia. The site is California Historical Landmark #153. Then, on February 24, 1854, the capitol moved back to Sacramento, Historical Landmark #869.

The former Vallejo capitol building was lost on August 20, 1859, as hay stored in the basement caught fire. Now a city parking lot on the 200 block of York Street, the Vallejo site was listed as California Historical Landmark number 574 on April 1, 1957.

A historical marker as placed at the Vallejo site by the Native Sons of the Golden West Historic Landmark Committee in 1938. The marker is located at the northwest corner of the lot, adjacent to the Vallejo Transit Center. There is a second, smaller marker as well.

== See also ==
- California Historical Landmarks in Solano County
