= Elk Grove Free Library =

Historical Landmark in Sacramento, United States

First County Free Library In California
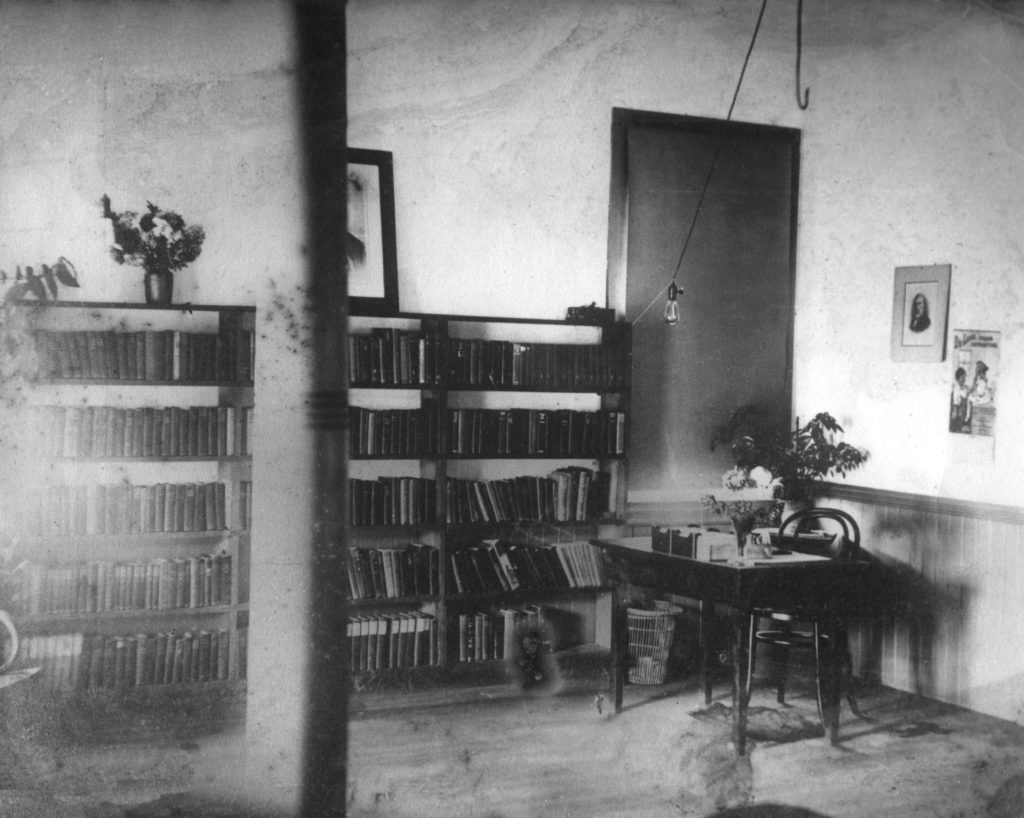
- Elk Grove Library in 1909

- Location within California Location within the United States
- 38.4090°N 121.3612°W
- Location: 9125 Elk Grove; Elk Grove, California

History
- Built: 1908

California Historical Landmark
- Designated: June 1, 1967
- Reference no.: 817

Site of First County Free Library Branch in California, is a historical site in Elk Grove, California in Sacramento County. The Free Library Branch opened in 1908 though the work of the principal of Elk Grove Union High School, Miss Harriet G. Eddy. The site of the County Free Library is at 9125 Elk Grove Boulevard, Elk Grove. With the success of the Elk Grove County Free Library other County Free Libraries started.

The site is California Historical Landmark No. 817, registered on June 1, 1967. At the site a historical marker was placed by State Department of Parks and Recreation working with Elk Grove Parlor No. 41, Native Sons of the Golden West and Liberty Parlor No. 213 Native Sons of the Golden West on September 9, 1967. The site is now home to Elk Grove Grange #86. The current Elk Grove Library is at 8900 Elk Grove Boulevard.

Principal of Elk Grove Union High School was Miss Harriet G. Eddy. Eddy was Principal from 1906 to 1909. Eddy was key is started Free Public Libraries in California then the idea spread around the world. The First County Free Library opened on October 19, 1908. At the Eddy became time Principal, Elk Grove Union High School had not passed the school accreditation standards, set by the Western Association of Schools and Colleges (WASC). Thus seniors that graduated Elk Grove Union High School, had go through a one year at accredited school if they wished to go to college or university. One of the missing parts of accreditation was to have a library. Elk Grove Union High School only had a mobile State Library, started in 1903 by the California State Librarian, Ames Gillis. Gillis learned about an Ohio tax that funded its State Library system in rural towns. Sacramento City Librarian, Lauren Ripley also wanted to expand the Library system. James Gillis, Lauren Ripley and the Harriet Eddy worked to start the new Library system. Eddy got a contract between the Sacramento County Board of Supervisors and the Elk Grove for an Elk Grove Library branch that opened October 19, 1908. At first the Schools hallway was used for the Library, this was too small and not a good, so the Woman's Christian Temperance Union building next to the school donated a room to used as the Library, that started with 1,000 books and grew. The Woman's Christian Temperance Union had donated rooms for classes till the 1893 school was built. Principal Eddy was the community librarian. In 1909 Eddy stepped down Principal, she had worked with Gillis State Librarian in Sacramento, she went to work for Gillis at the State Library Office from 1909 to 1919. At the State Library Office she help open Public libraries around the state. In 1919 she help set up library systems in Russia, Yugoslavia and then other European countries.

== See also ==
- California Historical Landmarks in Sacramento County
