= First Jewish Synagogue (Sacramento, California) =

Historical Landmark in Sacramento, United States

Site of First Jewish synagogue in Sacramento
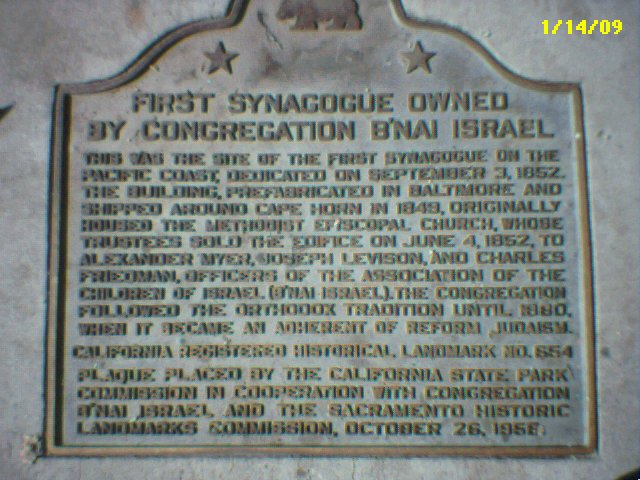
- Plaque of Congregation B'nai Israel located at 7th and Capitol Light Rail Station, Sacramento.

- Location within California Location within the United States
- 38.578°N 121.498°W
- Location: 1215 7th Street; Sacramento, California

History
- Built: 1852

California Historical Landmark
- Designated: October 26, 1958
- Reference no.: 654

Sacramento First Jewish synagogue sit is a California Historical Landmark No. 654 listed on October 26, 1958. The first and oldest Jewish Synagogue in Sacramento was dedicated on September 3, 1852. The Synagogue was used by California Gold Rush Jewish settlers to hold High Holy Days Services. B'nai Israel Sacramento, Association of the Children of Israel, was the first Jewish Synagogue on the Pacific coast of the United States. The founders of B'nai Israel were: Alexander Myer, Joseph Levison, and Charles Friedman. The B'nai Israel congregation was an Orthodox Jewish congregation until 1880. In 1880 B'nai Israel congregation changed to follow Reform Judaism. The 1852 Synagogue building, was previously a Methodist Episcopal church. The Jewish community purchased the church building on June 4, 1852. The building was built in Baltimore, Maryland, taken apart in shipped around Cape Horn and assembled in Sacramento in 1849 and called the Baltimore Chapel, founded on October 28, 1849. The Methodist Episcopal church moved to a building on 6th Street, now the First United Methodist Church Sacramento. The 1852 Synagogue building was lost in a fire in November 1852. The site of the First Jewish Synagogue is now at 1215 7th Street an office building.

== See also ==
- California Historical Landmarks in Sacramento County
