= Western Hotel (Sacramento, California) =

Historical Landmark in Sacramento, United States

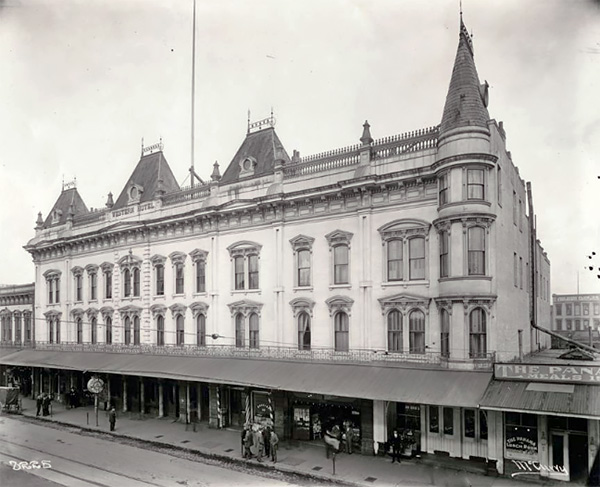
- Western Hotel built in 1875

- Location within California Location within the United States
- 38.582°N 121.503°W
- Location: 215 K Street; Sacramento, California

History
- Built: 1875

California Historical Landmark
- Designated: May 22, 1957
- Reference no.: 601

Western Hotel built in 1853, at 215 K Street, was destroyed on January 9, 1875, fire

Western Hotel, was an historical hotel in Sacramento, California. The site of the former hotel is a California Historical Landmark No. 601 listed on May 22, 1957. The Western Hotel was at/near the intersection of 2nd street and K Street, Sacramento and owned by William Land. The site is now a Parking lot under the Interstate 5 in California.

The site has had two hotels built at the location: An 1853 Hotel, and later the second Western Hotel, was built on the site in 1875 by William Land. The 1875 Hotel was one of the largest and grandest hotels in the western states at the time of completion. The 1854 Hotel supported the California Gold Rush Pioneers, it was built two blocks from the Sacramento waterfront and Central Pacific Railroad station. The 1875 building was removed when the Interstate 5 highway was built though the town in the 1960s. The original Sacramento Bee Building, California Historical Landmark No. 611 was also taken down at the same time.

== 1854 Western Hotel ==
The 1854 Western Hotel was owned by N.D. Thayer and sold to William Land in 1871. The 1854 three-story wooden Western Hotel burned to the ground on January 9, 1875. A fire started at 2:30 pm in the lamp room and quickly spread out, claiming three guest's lives out of the six guests in the hotel. The lamp room was used to refill the hotel's oil lamps. The fire department stopped the fire before other buildings caught fire. William Land had purchased the 1854 Western Hotel in 1871.

== 1875 Western Hotel ==
William Land had a new Western Hotel constructed on the spot. Work started in February 1875 and was completed July 1875. The new Western Hotel was larger with 350 guest rooms. It was made of brick, three-stories tall, and cost $200,000 to build. The hotel was 100 feet wide at the street and was 160 feet deep into the block. The 1875 Western Hotel was demolished during the Interstate Highway 5 development in the 1960s.

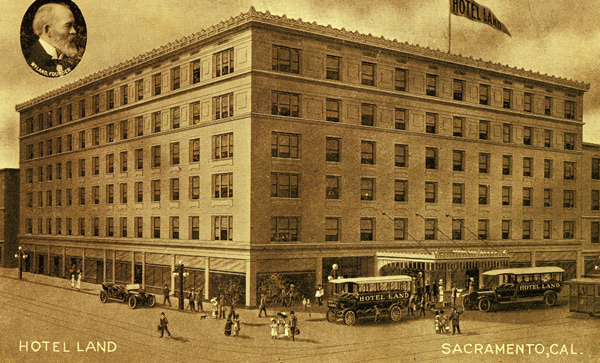
1910 Land Hotel in 1915, was at the corner of 10th Street and K street.

== William Land ==
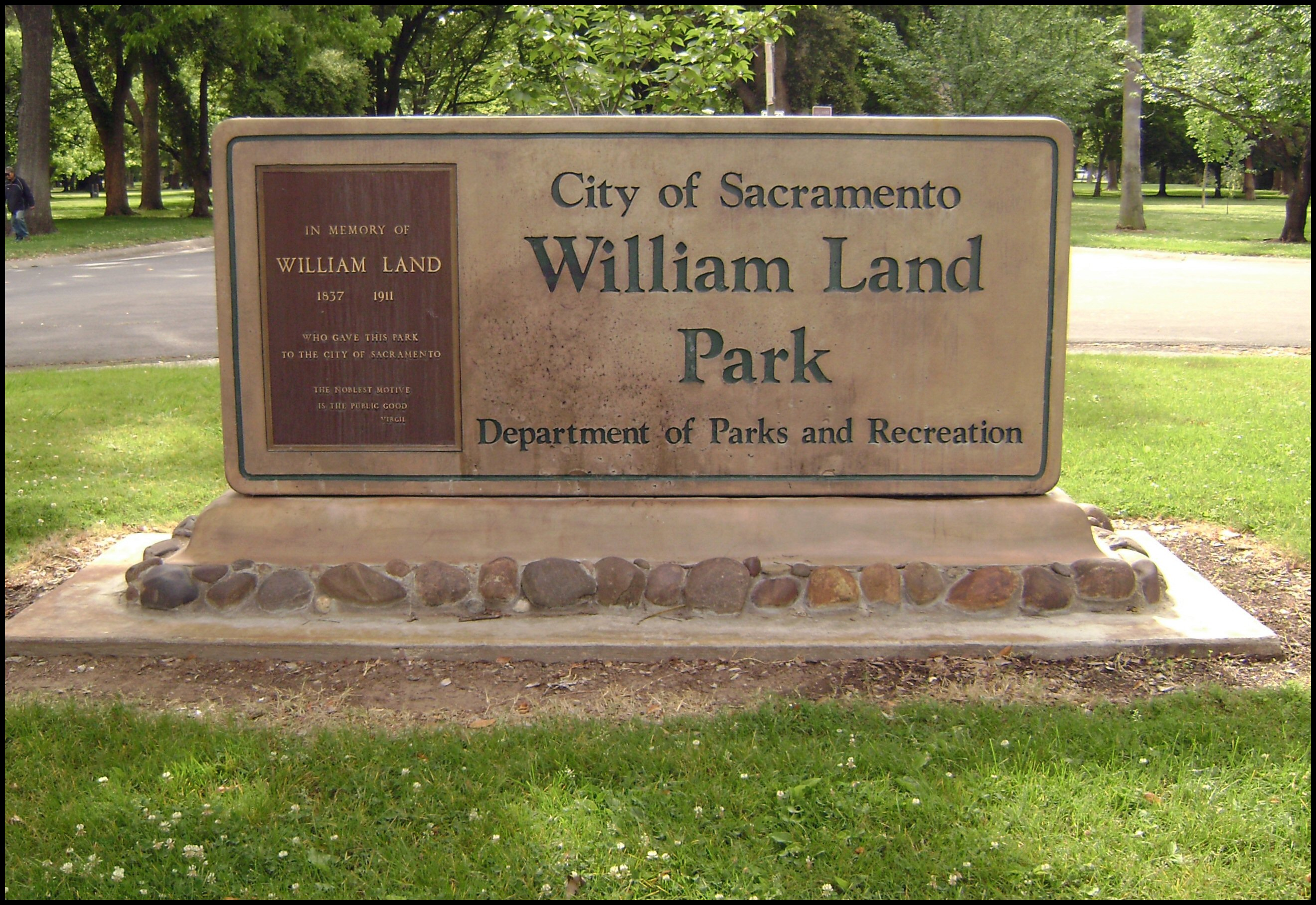
William Land Park Sacramento

William Land was born in 1836 in Herkimer, New York. With 14 children, Land's father sold William Land for $50 per year into indentured servitude. After William Land saved up and was able buy his freedom, he went to Iron City Commercial College in Pittsburgh, Pennsylvania. Broke, Land came to California looking for an opportunity in San Francisco in 1860. From San Francisco Land walked to the Western Hotel in Sacramento and rented a 50-cent room. At the Western Hotel he got a cleaning job and was a bell boy. After 11 years working at the hotel, Land had saved money and was able to buy the hotel from its owner, N.D. Thayer. To increase business, Land took out ads to promote his 207-room Western Hotel and restaurant.

With his profits, Land was able to purchase land lots next to the Western Hotel. Some of the lots were used to expand the Western Hotel. With his acquired wealth, he purchased the State House Hotel in 1892. State House Hotel was at the corner of 10th and K Streets. He had the State House Hotel taken down in 1909 and built a new five-story Hotel, The Land Hotel which opened on the site in 1910. The 300-guest room, Hotel Land, stood until it was demolished in 1961.

William Land was the mayor of Sacramento from 1898 to 1899. A wealthy man in Sacramento, and while mayor, he gave the city an $80,000 interest-free loan, rather than having the city pay high interest rates on city bonds. William Land died in 1911, at age 74. After his death, his will and testament gave away $450,000. Of this, $250,000 was to be used for a Sacramento public park. Then $200,000 to the City of Sacramento for income of which is to be used for the care of the indigent poor. Giving: $10,000 to the Sacramento Orphanage, and $5,000 each to Catholic Convent, YMCA, and YWCA. Of the $250,000 the city received, the city purchased 238 acres of land for a park in 1918, in what was called Sutterville. The 238 acres of land is now the William Land Regional Park, Land Park Playground, and William Land Golf Course. The William Land Park is bordered by Sutterville Road to the South, Freeport Boulevard to the East, 13th Avenue to the North, Land Park Drive to the West. The Sacramento Zoo is adjacent to the park.

== See also ==
- California Historical Landmarks in Sacramento County
- Adams and Company Building
