= Orleans Hotel =

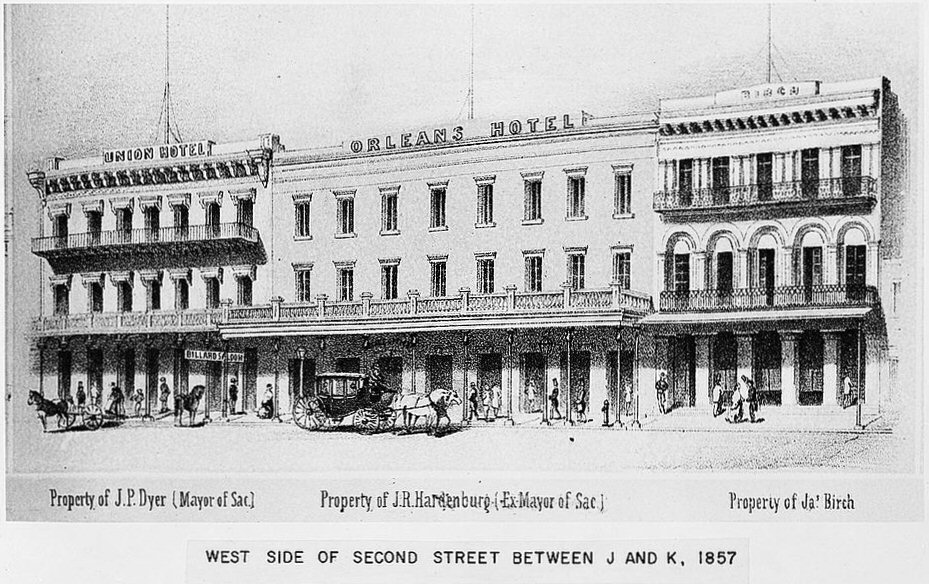
- 1857 sketch of Orleans Hotel with its neighboring buildings
- Interactive map of Orleans Hotel
- Location: 1018 2nd Street, Sacramento, California (Old Sacramento)
- Coordinates: 38°34′57″N 121°30′17″W
- Built: 1852

California Historical Landmark
- Reference no.: 608

The Orleans Hotel is a building listed as a California Historical Landmark. Formerly a prominent hotel in Sacramento, California, it now serves as upscale apartments in Old Sacramento.

== History ==
The original Orleans Hotel was built by materials from New Orleans shipped around Cape Horn by its owner Maria Hastings. There were 40 rooms and a saloon downstairs that served as a frequent stop for stagecoaches that were on their way to the mines during the California Gold Rush. Mark Twain had even resided in the hotel in 1866 during his employment at the Sacramento Union. The building burned down in 1852 along with many other Sacramento buildings in a large fire. It was rebuilt by the next year, this time in brick, only to meet the same fate in another fire in 1923.

Several attempts were made to build on the site of the former Orleans Hotel since 1975, but none succeeded until a business owner financed a new mixed-use building in 2007, with construction finished in 2008.

Today the new Orleans Hotel replica is a four-story building with an exterior that matches the Gold Rush-era original. There are 24 rental lofts on the upper floors and was built with plans for a restaurant and other retail opportunities on the bottom floor.

== See also ==
- History of Sacramento
