= Folsom Depot =

Former train station in Folsom, California

Folsom
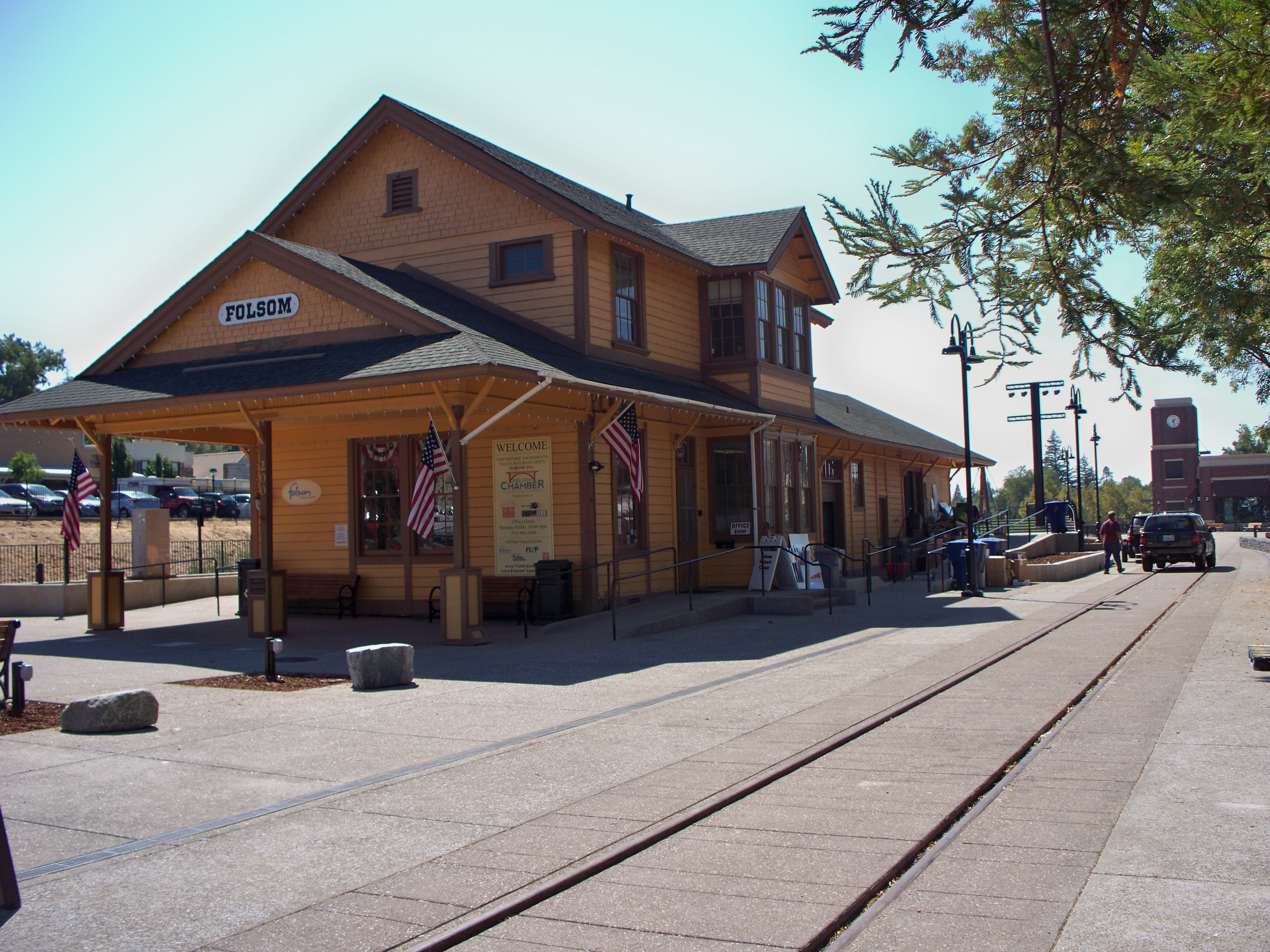
- The station building in 2008

General information
- Location: 200 Wool Street; Folsom, California
- Owner: Sacramento Valley Railroad (1856–1877); Sacramento and Placerville Railroad (1877–1888); Northern Railway (1888–1898); Southern Pacific Railroad (1898–1970); City of Folsom (1970– )

History
- Opened: February 22, 1856
- Rebuilt: c. 1906

Services
Preceding station	Southern Pacific Railroad	Following station
Orangevale toward Sacramento	Placerville Branch	Cameron Park toward Placerville
- Folsom Depot
- U.S. National Register of Historic Places
- California Historical Landmark
- Coordinates: 38.679167°N 121.179722°W
- Built: c. 1906
- Built by: Southern Pacific Railroad
- NRHP reference No.: 82002229
- CHISL No.: 558
- Added to NRHP: February 19, 1982
Location

Folsom Depot is a former train station in Folsom, California.

== History ==
The station site was established as the eastern terminal of the Sacramento Valley Railroad. The rail yard and initial station layout were engineered by Theodore Judah. Service began on February 22, 1856, as the first passenger railroad in the state.

After a series of acquisitions and mergers, the facility came under the ownership of the Southern Pacific Railroad. The railroad constructed a new station building by 1906. The depot was wired for electricity in 1909 and in 1916 the second story was added. Fire damage in 1924 and 1930 was repaired with minor alterations.

The property, minus the turntable stands, were donated to the City of Folsom in 1970. In 1972, Ashland Station building of the Sacramento, Placer, and Nevada Railroad was moved to the site.

The depot and freight yard were listed as a California Historical Landmark under the name Folsom Terminal in 1956. The station building, turntable, and tracks was added to the National Register of Historic Places on February 19, 1982.

When the railway line was rebuilt as light rail in the 2000s, the Folsom terminal was built two blocks to the southwest at Historic Folsom station.

== Design ==
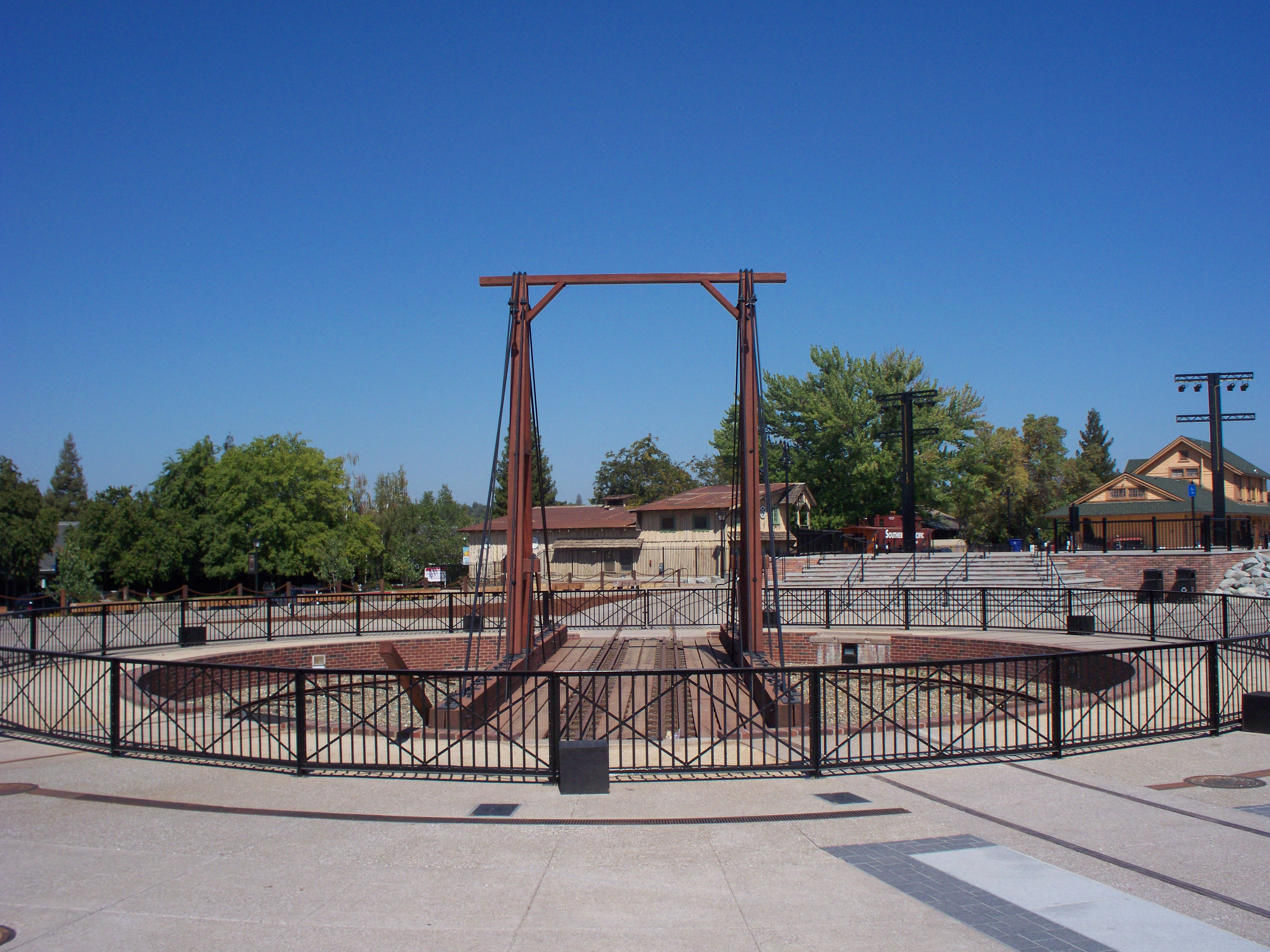
Replica of the original turntable at the Folsom Terminal

The station building was initially constructed as a single story building, but was eventually finished to a standard design: Two-Story Combination Depot No. 22.
