= D.O. Mills Bank Building =

Historical Landmark in Sacramento, United States

Mills Bank Building
- Mills Bank Building and J Street in 1912

- Location within California Location within the United States
- 38.5827°N 121.5042°W
- Location: 629 J Street, Sacramento, California

History
- Built: 1852

Site notes
- Architect(s): Willis Polk & Co.
- Architectural style: Neoclassical

California Historical Landmark
- Reference no.: 609

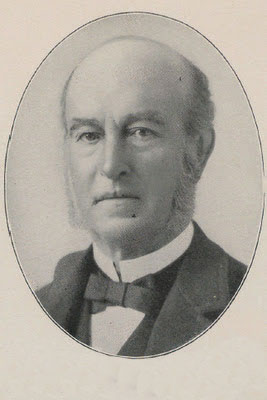
Darius Ogden Mills

Mills Bank Building, also called the D. O. Mills Bank Building, is a historical bank in Sacramento, California, built in 1852 in Old Sacramento. It is a California Historical Landmark No. 609, registered on May 22, 1957. It was built by Darius Ogden Mills and was the oldest and largest bank of early California.

== History ==
Darius O. Mills moved to Sacramento in 1848 at age 22 from North Salem, New York, set on looking for gold, but changed to trading. He sold goods in San Francisco and took them up the San Joaquin River for California Gold Rush miners. From this he saw the need for bank to support them. With his brothers, he started the bank on the corner of 3rd Street and J Street. He incorporated the National Gold Bank of D. O. Mills and Company in 1872. The bank was very successful and, in 1912, a new building was built at 7th Street and I Street. Mills died on January 3, 1910, at Millbrae, California, at the age of 84.

In 1925, there was a merger of California National Bank, the California Trust & Savings Bank and the National Bank of D. O. Mills. The 3rd Street and J Street building was expanded and called the California National Bank. The bank closed in 1933, after President Franklin D. Roosevelt's Emergency Banking Act of 1933. No depositors lost their funds after the closure. The building was sold to the State of California and used for the California Bureau of Vital Statistics, the California Industrial Accident Claims Board and other California offices. The Bank of Sacramento opened at 812 J Street in 1963 and moved to the former State building May 1966. The Bank of Sacramento was merged into Security Pacific National Bank in August 1979. In 1990, the bank building was sold to private owners.

The building's first floor is the Sacramento Grand Ballroom. In 2017, a food court was added. Some of the bank building has been saved including the original antique brass teller cages and the Italian Marble bar railing. "National Bank of D. O. Mills & Co." and the numerals 1912 are set into the granite front of the building.

== See also ==
- California Historical Landmarks in Sacramento County
- Adams and Company Building
