= Ebner's Hotel =

Historical hotel

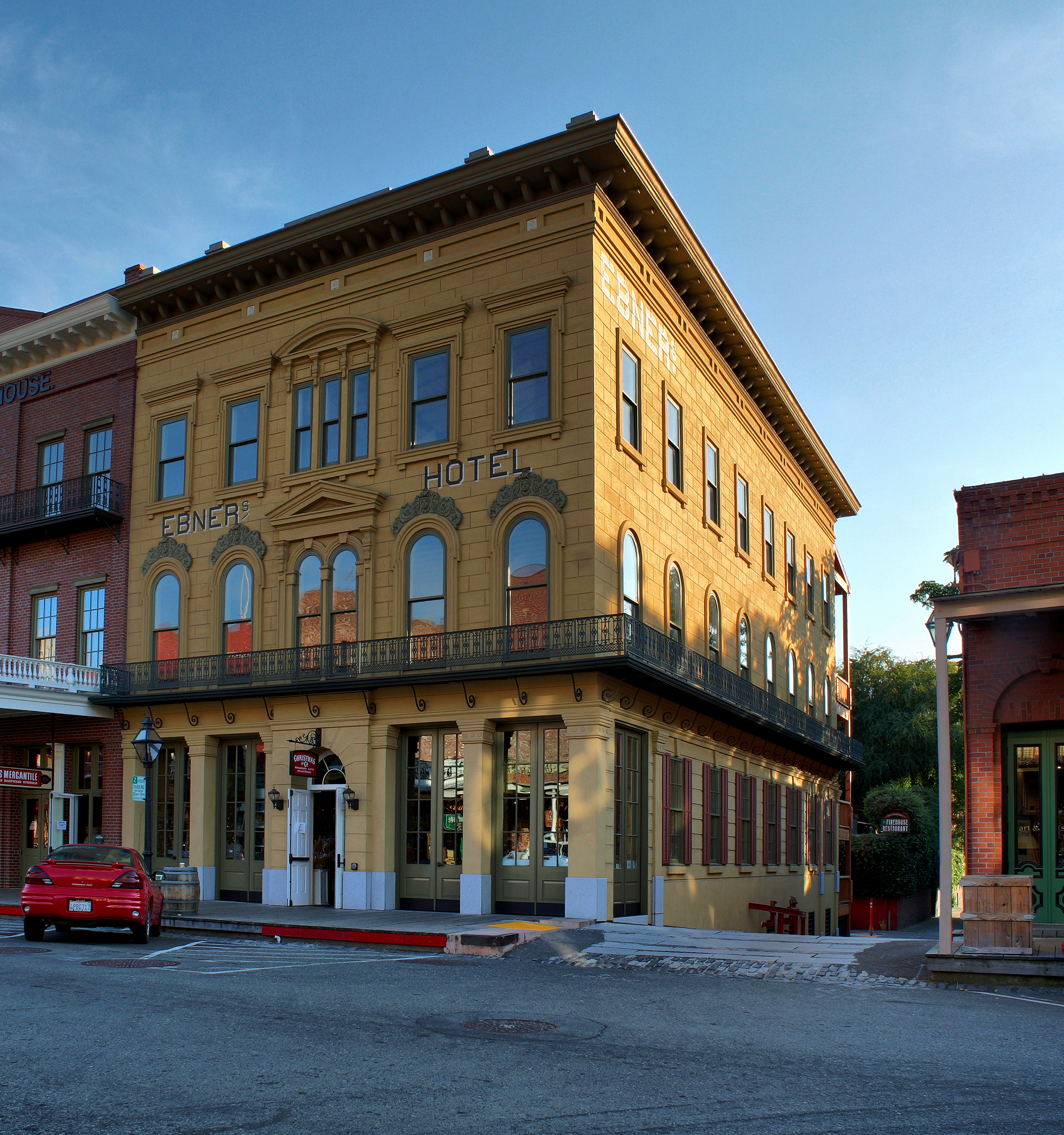
- Ebner's Hotel, modern replica in 2011
- Location: 116 1/2 K St., Sacramento, California (Old Sacramento)
- Coordinates: 38.582°N 121.5052°W
- Built: 1856
- Architect: Charles and Francis (Frank) Ebner

California Historical Landmark
- Reference no.: 602

Ebner's Hotel was a historic hotel located in Sacramento, California, listed as a California Historical Landmark, that was built in 1856 for and possibly by the Ebner brothers, Charles and Francis (Frank) Ebner.

== History ==
A "luxurious landmark" for its period, the Ebner brothers built the 36-room hotel themselves on the site of previous hotels at 116 1/2 K Street, close to the Sacramento River—a major source of transportation throughout the area at that time. The cupola that rose high enough to mark the skyline was an indicator to incoming travelers who could see it that they had nearly reached Sacramento. Charles Ebner, in addition to managing the hotel, also ran a liquor business from the hotel's basement. One source of pride for the hotel was the fact that John Sutter had been known to have lodged there as he was a friend of the Ebner brothers and frequented their saloon.

By 1863, the Ebner brothers had leased out the hotel management so that they could focus on their liquor-selling prospects. The hotel reportedly had a good reputation until the 1870s when the railroad moved into the area, changing the feel for the neighborhood, and other, bigger hotels were located closer to modern-day Downtown Sacramento. The section of Sacramento that Ebner's Hotel was located in was now referred to as "West End." In time, the region was to be known as a slum, and Ebner's Hotel was to be classified as a flophouse. In the 1930s, the area began to fall into disrepair as transportation moved from the rivers to roads, leaving the area, in essence, and the hotel itself began to draw the homeless.

In their 1980 report of the building, the Historic American Buildings Survey noted that the facade had been stripped of its ornamentation, and a city historian noted that the once famed cupola likely had been removed when bits and pieces had chipped off due to neglect.

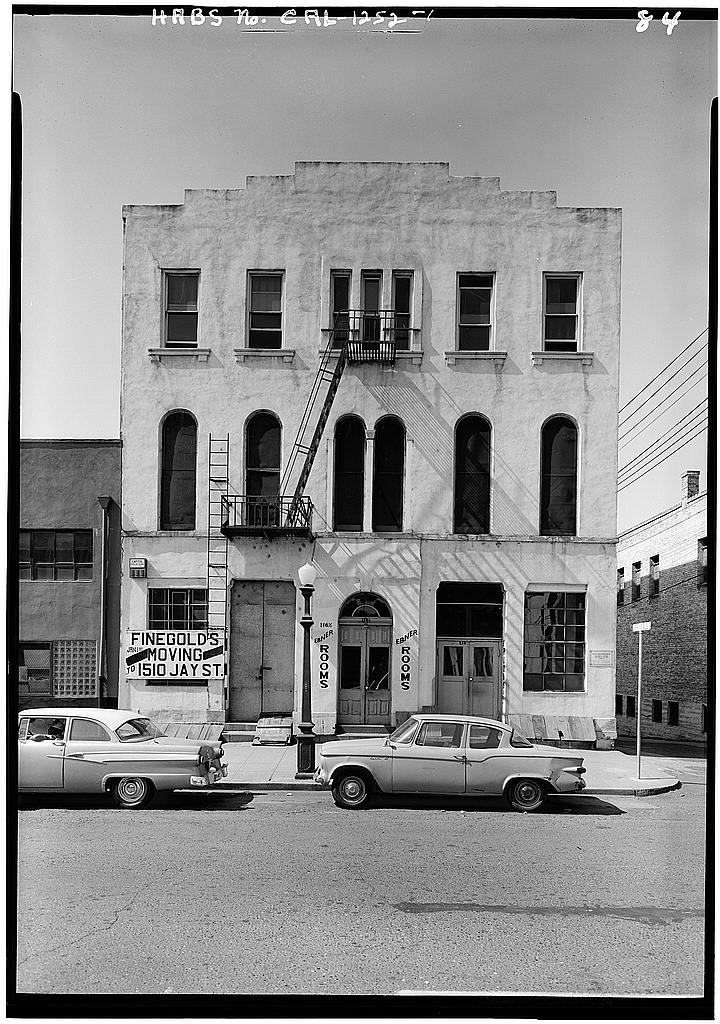
Original Ebner's Hotel, July 1965

== 21st century ==
As the building entered the 21st century, it was one of two buildings still in existence in Old Sacramento that had not been rehabilitated and one of the few original buildings of Sacramento left. The City of Sacramento responded to requests for demolition by hiring an engineering firm to assess it. It was ultimately deemed that the structure was too unsound to repair. The city then deliberated on whether to stabilize the current building (sans repairs) or whether to raze it, with many local vendors calling for the demolition of the building as its condition required that alley access near it be cut off—thus reducing foot traffic to stores.

The city eventually decided to demolish the building and replace it with a "rebuilt replica."
