= Pioneer First Congregational Church =

Historical Landmark in Sacramento, United States

Sacramento First Congregational Church
- Rev. Joseph A. Benton, founder of First Congregational Church, the first church in Sacramento

- Location within California Location within the United States
- 38.582°N 121.498°W
- Location: 915 6th Street; Sacramento, California

History
- Founded: 1849
- Built: 1854

California Historical Landmark
- Designated: May 22, 1957
- Reference no.: 613

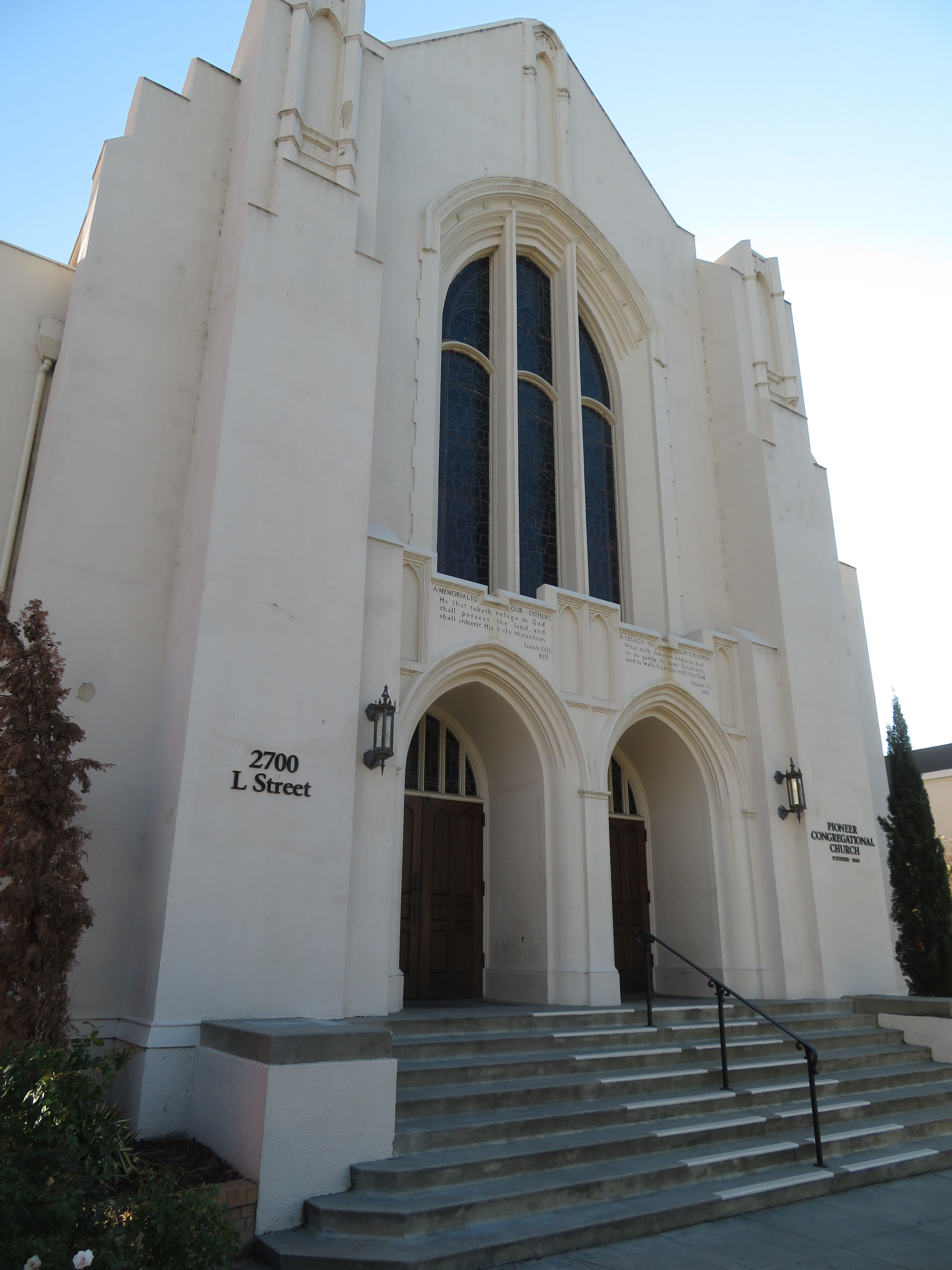
The 1926 Pioneer Congregational Church building at 2700 L Street

Sacramento First Congregational Church (Pioneer Congregational Church) was the first church in Sacramento, California. It was founded in 1849. The site of the First Congregational Church building is a California Historical Landmark, No. 612, listed on May 22, 1957.

The first church in Sacramento was founded in 1849 by Rev. Joseph A. Benton, who was the pastor from 1849 to 1863. The church building was at 915 6th Street, built in 1854. A cornerstone ceremony was held on September 21, 1854. Before the structure was built, the church used a small one-room schoolhouse on the northwest corner of I and 3rd streets, 303 I Street, in Old Sacramento. The attendees at the founding were mostly Swiss and German settlers of Sutter's Fort and New Helvetia. The church grew with the California Gold Rush pioneers coming to California. The site is now an office building on L Street.

In 1926 Pioneer Congregational Church built a new church building, its third building, at 2700 L street, which is still in use.

== Rev. Joseph A. Benton ==
Rev. Joseph Augustine Benton (Dr. Joseph A. Benton) was born in Connecticut on May 7, 1818. He arrived at San Francisco in 1849 on the ship Edward Everett, then moved to Sacramento as an early California pioneer. He moved back to San Francisco in 1864 to pastor a church from 1863 to 1869. He worked at Pacific Theological Seminary as a senior professor of Biblical literature from 1869 to 1892. He was a founding trustee of College of California (University of California) in Oakland, California in 1853. He was elected into the California State Senate from Sacramento in 1863.

Benton married Frances Sargent Benton (1772–1853) in 1863.

Benton died on April 8, 1892, at age 73 in Oakland.

== See also ==
- California Historical Landmarks in Sacramento County
