= Pony Express Terminal =

Historic commercial building in Sacramento, California

- U.S. National Register of Historic Places
- U.S. National Historic Landmark
- U.S. Historic district – Contributing property
- California Historical Landmark
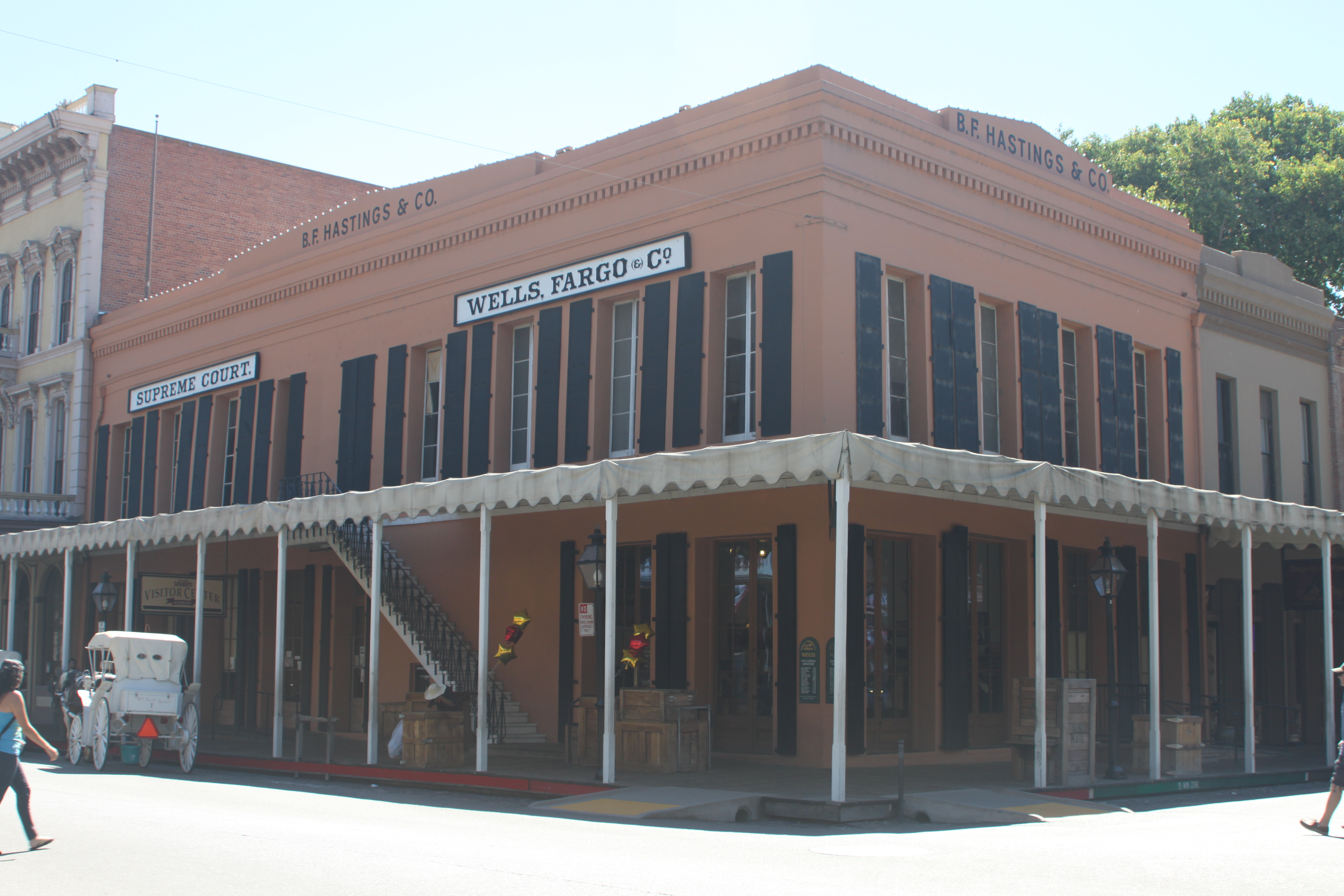
- B. F. Hastings Bank Building

- Location within Sacramento, California Location within California Location within the United States
- Location: 1000 2nd St., Sacramento, California
- Coordinates: 38°34′59″N 121°30′11″W
- Area: less than one acre
- Built: 1852
- Part of: Old Sacramento Historic District (ID66000219)
- NRHP reference No.: 66000220
- CHISL No.: 606

Significant dates
- Added to NRHP: October 15, 1966
- Designated NHL: July 4, 1961
- Designated CP: January 12, 1965

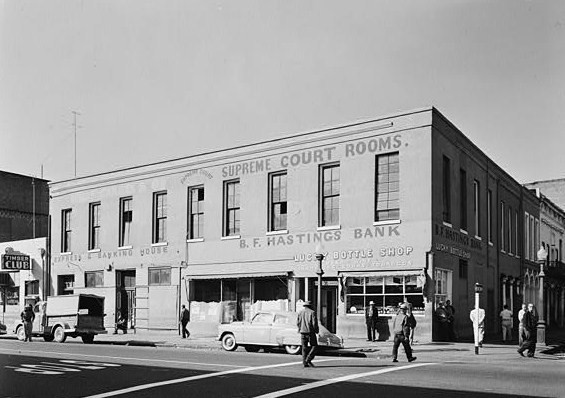
B. F. Hastings Bank Building in 1960

The Pony Express Terminal, also known as the B. F. Hastings Bank Building, is a historic commercial building at 1000 2nd Street in Sacramento, California. Built in 1852, it was the western endpoint of the Pony Express from 1860 to 1861, the period of the service's operation. It was declared a National Historic Landmark in 1966. It now houses a museum dedicated to the history of Wells Fargo, and is part of Old Sacramento State Historic Park, itself a National Historic Landmark District. The B. F. Hastings Bank Building is a California Historical Landmark No. 606.

== Description ==
The B.F. Hastings Bank Building is located in Sacramento's historic downtown area, at the southwest corner of 2nd and J Streets. It is an architecturally undistinguished two-story brick structure, presenting four bays to J Street and nine to 2nd Street. A single-story canopy extends across the sidewalk in front of both facades, supported by simple square posts. A metal staircase rises in the middle of the 2nd Street facade to an entrance on the second floor.

== History ==
The building was constructed in 1852. When the Pony Express began service in 1860, this building was selected by its operators as the western terminus of the service, whose eastern end was in St. Joseph, Missouri, more than 1,800 miles (2,900 km) away. The building was also the first location of the California Supreme Court.

The building is now home to one of two museums about the history of Wells Fargo in Sacramento. This location features a re-created 19th-century Wells Fargo Express Company office, artifacts of company history and the California Gold Rush era, and exhibits about the company's role in California Gold Rush commerce. (The other Wells Fargo History Museum in Sacramento is located in the Wells Fargo Center.)

== See also ==
- History of Sacramento, California
- Old Sacramento State Historic Park
- California Historical Landmarks in Sacramento County
- California Historical Landmarks in Sacramento County, California
- List of National Historic Landmarks in California
- National Register of Historic Places listings in Sacramento County, California
- Index: Historic districts in California
