= Adams and Company Building =

Historical Landmark in Sacramento, United States

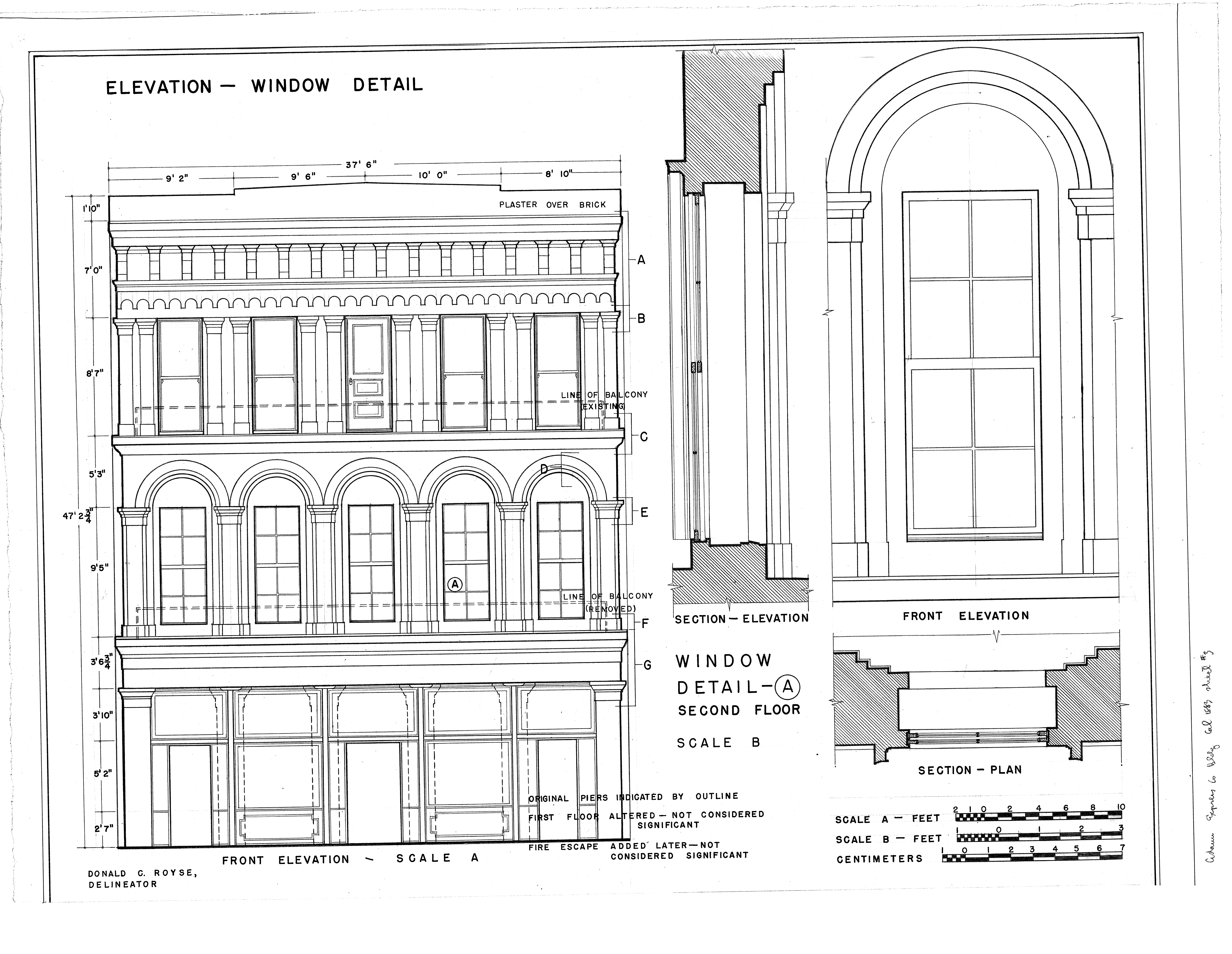
- Adams and Company Building

- Location within California Location within the United States
- 38.5826°N 121.5044°W
- Location: 1014 2nd Street Sacramento, California

History
- Built: 1853

Site notes
- Architect: Historic American Buildings Survey

California Historical Landmark
- Reference no.: 607

Adams and Company Building is a historic brick-and-granite building (with granite from quarries near present-day Folsom) in Sacramento, California associated with early communications, finance, and transportation services. The building is designated California Historical Landmark No. 607 and stands at 1014 2nd Street in Old Sacramento State Historic Park. Adams and Company ceased operations after its banker, Page, Bacon & Company, failed in 1855.

The Adams and Company Building has been used for:

- Adams and Company's express and banking house, 1853–1855.
- Alta Telegraph Company.
- California State Telegraph Company.
- Pacific Express Company, founded on March 1, 1855, by former Adams and Company employees; closed in 1857.
- California Stage Company.
- Sacramento City Bank, 1850, John M. Rhodes (Rhodes, Sturges & Co), with a Shasta branch; failed February 12, 1857.
- Wells Fargo & Co. offices in the 1850s.
- Central Overland (Pony Express) office in 1861.
- State Telephone Company.
- Western Union.
- Old Sac Leather Works, founded in 1983.

== See also ==
- California Historical Landmarks in Sacramento County
