= California State Route 275 =

Highway in California

State Route 275
- SR 275 highlighted in red (just the length of the Tower Bridge crossing the Sacramento River), with relinquished portions in pink

Route information
- Maintained by Caltrans
- Length: 0.14 mi (230 m)
- Existed: 1965–1996, 2010–present
- History: State highway in 1910; became US 40/US 99 (later US 99W) in 1928–1929, I-5/I-80 in 1964, and SR 275 in 1967

Major junctions
- West end: West side of the Sacramento River in West Sacramento (State maintenance)
- East end: East side of the Sacramento River in Sacramento (State maintenance)

Location
- Country: United States
- State: California
- Counties: Yolo, Sacramento

Highway system
- State highways in California; Interstate; US; State; Scenic; History; Pre‑1964; Unconstructed; Deleted; Freeways
← SR 274	→ I-280

State Route 275 (SR 275) is an unsigned state highway in the U.S. state of California running between West Sacramento and Downtown Sacramento. Since 1996, the highway has been legally defined to be just the length of the Tower Bridge crossing the Sacramento River. Prior to that year, SR 275 was also known as the West Sacramento Freeway, and was a short spur connecting Interstate 80 Business (BL 80) / U.S. Route 50 (US 50) in West Sacramento, and the Tower Bridge. SR 275 also extended east into Sacramento along the Capitol Mall from the bridge to 9th Street, just west of the California State Capitol. West Sacramento completed a project to replace the freeway with a pedestrian-friendly street initially named Tower Bridge Gateway. The street was renamed Cabaldon Parkway in honor of former West Sacramento mayor Christopher Cabaldon. Nevertheless, some maps may still continue to mark SR 275 as running between BL 80 / US 50 and 9th Street.

== Route description ==
Since 1996, SR 275 has been defined to be the length of the Tower Bridge, a four-lane lift bridge across the Sacramento River that formerly carried a Sacramento Northern Railroad track in the center. Section 575 of the California Streets and Highways Code specifically states, "Route 275 is the Tower Bridge from the west side of the Sacramento River near the City of West Sacramento to the east side of the Sacramento River near the City of Sacramento".

Prior to 1996, SR 275 was part of the West Sacramento Freeway. The West Sacramento Freeway designation begins on Interstate 80 at exit 81 (West Capitol Avenue), the east end of the Yolo Causeway. It soon splits, with I-80 exiting to bypass Sacramento to the north and Interstate 80 Business (legislatively U.S. Route 50) continuing east via exit 82 towards downtown. After one interchange, at Harbor Boulevard (exit 1/1B), the freeway splits again, with Bus. 80 turning abruptly southeast over the Pioneer Memorial Bridge to avoid downtown Sacramento. The original SR 275 designation then began here, at exit 3 of Bus. 80, with full access to and from the intersecting Jefferson Boulevard (State Route 84).

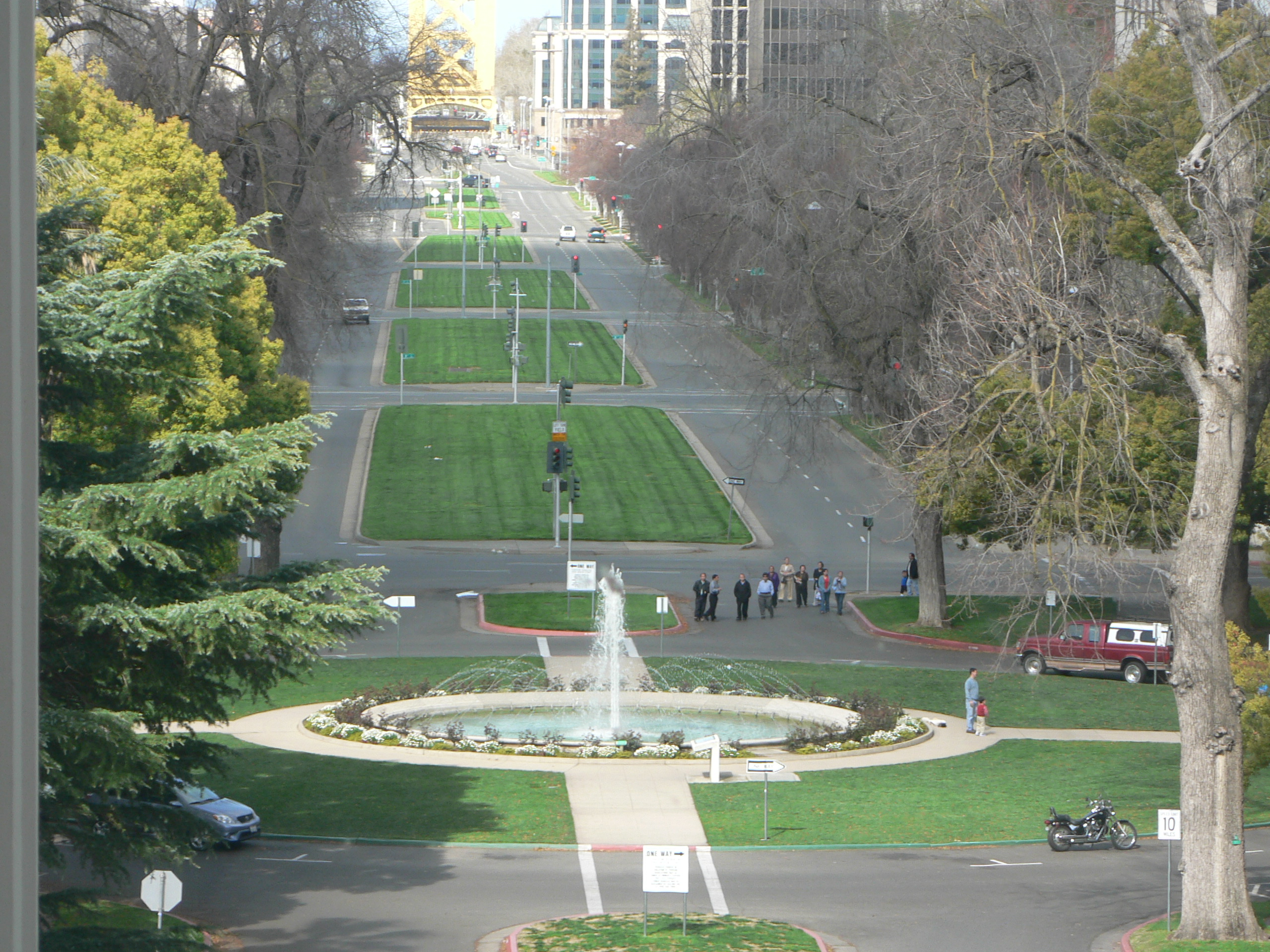
Capitol Mall, with 9th Street — the former east end of SR 275 — behind the fountain

After the Jefferson Boulevard interchange, the road — now maintained by the city of West Sacramento as Cabaldon Parkway — crosses the new Grand Street at an at-grade intersection. This intersection replaced a partial trumpet interchange, oriented towards West Capitol Avenue with a missing westbound entrance, in 2007. After Cabaldon Parkway crosses under the Union Pacific Railroad line that used to cross the Tower Bridge, it approaches an intersection with 5th Street. It was formerly a ramp that entered the westbound lanes from the intersection of West Capitol Avenue and 5th Street, which completed the former interchange at Riske Lane. Two blocks to the east, Cabaldon Parkway approaches its final intersection in West Sacramento with 3rd and Riverfront Streets. A westbound offramp formerly led to West Capitol Avenue and 3rd Street, with eastbound access to Broderick to the north and the formerly industrial area to the south, now containing Sutter Health Park.

State maintenance resumes once again as SR 275 as the road crosses the Sacramento River on the Tower Bridge. At the east end of the bridge, SR 275 ends and the roadway becomes Capitol Mall, maintained by the city of Sacramento, and crosses over Interstate 5. Seven blocks later, the main road ends at 9th Street; the last block of Capitol Mall to 10th Street, on which the State Capitol fronts, is a two-lane road with a mid-block traffic circle around a fountain.

SR 275 is part of the National Highway System, a network of highways that are considered essential to the country's economy, defense, and mobility by the Federal Highway Administration.

== History ==
SR 275 began as part of Legislative Route 6, one of the shorter main routes of the initial system funded by the 1910 bond issue. This highway, which included the several-mile-long Yolo Causeway, connected Sacramento with the north–south Route 7 at Davis, thereby linking the capital city with the San Francisco Bay Area. Route 6 traffic initially left Sacramento on the 1911 I Street Bridge, heading southwest through the small settlement of Washington via D Street, 5th Street, and present Tower Court to West Capitol Avenue. The state highway was moved to the M Street Bridge in 1926, as part of an improvement that also took it through a two-lane subway under the Sacramento Northern Railroad, still present on West Capitol Avenue. The M Street Bridge was replaced by the Tower Bridge in 1935.

U.S. Routes 40 and 99 (soon 99W) were marked along Route 6 in 1928. These two routes remained on West Capitol Avenue until 1954, when the new West Sacramento Freeway opened, connecting the west end of the Tower Bridge with the east end of the Yolo Causeway. Traveler-oriented businesses along the bypassed West Capitol Avenue were hit hard by the shifting of through traffic.

The entire freeway was designated as part of Interstate 80 in the late 1950s. However, two bypasses were planned — a realignment of Route 6 that would take I-80 over a new bridge and around the south side of downtown, and a northern bypass of the entire city (I-880). Since the southerly bypass had not been completed in time for the 1964 renumbering, the route over the Tower Bridge — and along downtown streets — became Route 80, but US 99W signage remained (initially following Capitol Mall to near the State Capitol, later turning south onto 3rd and 5th Streets east of the bridge) until the late 1960s, before I-5 had finished replacing old US 99W north of Woodland.

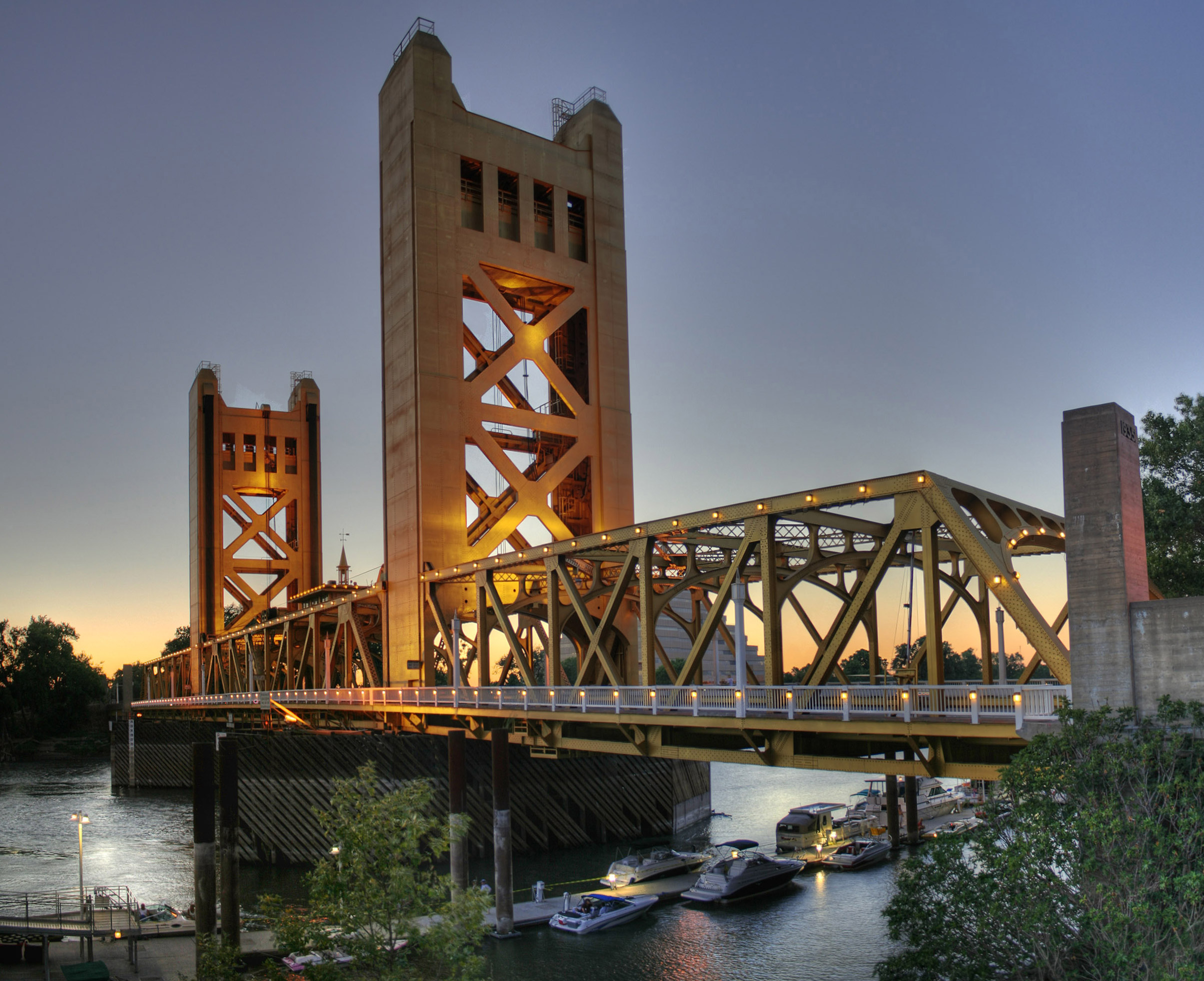
The Tower Bridge

Normally, upon completion of the new I-80 south of downtown, the old alignment over the Tower Bridge and through downtown would be relinquished to local control. The legislature recognized that it might be useful to keep a state highway to the Capitol, and so in 1966 it passed a concurrent resolution requesting that the California Highway Commission delay relinquishment west of 9th Street until the last day of the 1967 legislative session. During that session, a new Route 275 was created from that portion of former Route 80. This consisted of the eastern part of the West Sacramento Freeway, the Tower Bridge, and Capitol Mall up to 9th Street, just west of the capitol building. The portion in Sacramento, east of the bridge, was not to be beautified with state highway funds. Due to the cancellation of a replacement of the North Sacramento Freeway, I-80 was moved to former I-880 around the city in 1981, giving the West Sacramento Freeway three numbers: I-80, US 50, and SR 275.

In 1993, the West Sacramento City Council approved the "Triangle Specific Plan" for a new downtown in the triangle bounded by the Sacramento River, SR 275, and US 50; this plan included downgrading the freeway to a surface road. The state legislature passed a law in 1994 that allowed Caltrans to come to an agreement with West Sacramento or Sacramento for the relinquishment of any part of SR 275. Although no portions had yet been relinquished, the legislature deleted Route 275 from the Streets and Highways Code in 1996.

The Triangle redevelopment happened slowly, with the first part — Raley Field (now Sutter Health Park) — opening in 2000. Effective January 1, 2001, Caltrans relinquished SR 275 to West Sacramento between postmiles 12.4 (west of Riske Lane) and 13.0 (the west end of the Tower Bridge). The city renamed the road Tower Bridge Gateway and demolished the Riske Lane overpass in early 2007, replacing it with a signalized intersection that now serves the new Garden Street (later renamed Grand Street).

The city of Sacramento also wished to modify its section of SR 275, which, while not a freeway, was still designed for motor vehicle traffic. Capitol Mall east of postmile 0.11 (the east end of the Tower Bridge) was relinquished to the city effective January 1, 2006. A ramp from the bridge to N Street was closed in July 2007, allowing the block it had cut diagonally through to be sold. The ramp's counterpart, from L Street to the Tower Bridge, remained open, though the lot that includes it was sold to the Sacramento Housing and Redevelopment Agency in 2005. The ramp finally closed to traffic in 2016 in conjunction with a project to connect 2nd Street in Old Sacramento to Capitol Mall.

These 2001 and 2007 relinquishments left Caltrans maintaining only two pieces of SR 275 — the Tower Bridge and the west end through the Jefferson Boulevard (SR 84) interchange — for a total of about 0.9 miles (1.4 km), under half of the 1967-2001 length. A joint project to widen the bridge sidewalks was carried out by Sacramento, West Sacramento, and Caltrans. The project was completed in May 2008.

A second phase to convert the remaining section of freeway of Tower Bridge Gateway to a city street began in 2010. The 3rd Street underpass and subsequent interchange was removed and signalized intersections at 5th and 3rd Streets were constructed. The project was completed in November 2011.

The legislature added Route 275 back to the Streets and Highways Code in 2010, but its definition now only includes "Tower Bridge from the west side of the Sacramento River near the City of West Sacramento to the east side of the Sacramento River near the City of Sacramento."

On November 6, 2024, Tower Bridge Gateway was renamed Cabaldon Parkway in honor of former West Sacramento mayor Christopher Cabaldon.

As of 2024, only two interchanges of the former SR 275 remain: a diamond interchange at Jefferson Boulevard (SR 84) and the split at Business Loop 80 / US 50.

== Major intersections ==
Except where prefixed with a letter, postmiles were measured on the road as it was in 1964, based on the alignment of Route 80 as it existed at that time, and do not necessarily reflect current mileage. Postmile prefixes include: R reflecting a realignment in the route since then, M indicating a second realignment, L referring to an overlap due to a correction or change, and T indicating postmiles classified as temporary. Segments that remain unconstructed or have been relinquished to local control may be omitted. The numbers reset at county lines; the start and end postmiles in each county are given in the county column.

County	Location	Postmile	Destinations	Notes
Yolo; YOL 11.70-13.08	West Sacramento	12.90	Cabaldon Parkway	Continuation beyond 3rd Street; former US 40 west / US 99W north / SR 275 west; formerly Tower Bridge Gateway; connects to US 50 west
Yolo; YOL 11.70-13.08	West Sacramento	12.90	3rd Street / Riverfront Street	Former interchange with South River Road and West Capitol Avenue; west end of SR 275
Sacramento River		13.08 0.00	Tower Bridge	
Sacramento; SAC 0.00-0.70	Sacramento	0.07	Neasham Circle	No left turn from SR 275 east; east end of SR 275
Sacramento; SAC 0.00-0.70	Sacramento	0.07	Capitol Mall	Continuation beyond Neasham Circle; former US 40 east / US 99W south / SR 275 east; connects to I-5 via a right turn at 3rd Street
1.000 mi = 1.609 km; 1.000 km = 0.621 mi: Incomplete access
