= Tower Bridge (Sacramento, California) =

Bridge in Sacramento and West Sacramento, California

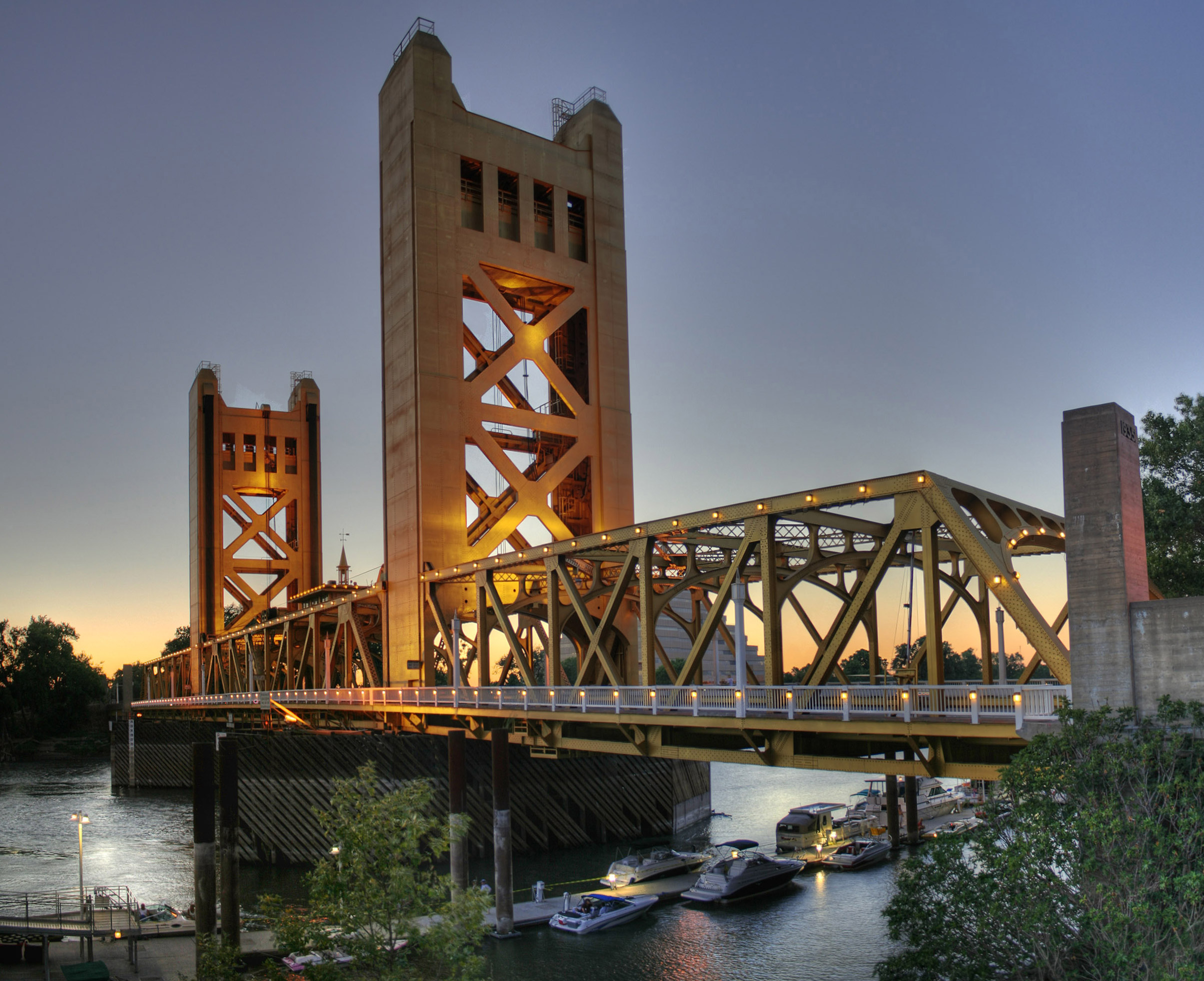
- The Tower Bridge just after sunset
- Coordinates: 38.580556°N 121.508333°W
- Carries: Cars, bicycles, pedestrians, and previously railroad on 4 vehicle lanes and 2 bicycle lanes of SR 275 (Cabaldon Parkway/Capitol Mall)
- Crosses: Sacramento River, West Sacramento/Sacramento city limits, and Yolo/Sacramento county line
- Locale: West Sacramento and Sacramento, California
- Maintained by: Caltrans
- NBI: 22 0021

Characteristics
- Design: Vertical lift bridge
- Total length: 737 ft (225 m)
- Width: 52 ft (16 m)
- Height: 160 ft (49 m)
- Longest span: 209 ft (64 m) lift span
- No. of spans: 8
- Piers in water: 2
- Clearance below: 100 ft (30 m) above high water

History
- Architect: Alfred Eichler
- Constructed by: George Pollock & Company
- Construction cost: US$994,000 (equivalent to $23,340,000 in 2025)
- Opened: December 15, 1935
- Replaces: 1910 Sacramento Northern Railway swing through-truss bridge
- Tower Bridge
- U.S. National Register of Historic Places
- Architect: Alfred Eichler
- Architectural style: Span Drive Type
- NRHP reference No.: 82004845
- Designated: 1982

Location
- Interactive map of Tower Bridge

The Tower Bridge is a vertical lift bridge across the Sacramento River, linking West Sacramento in Yolo County to the west, with the capital of California, Sacramento, in Sacramento County to the east. It has also been known as M Street Bridge. It was previously a part of U.S. Route 40 until that highway was truncated to east of Salt Lake City as well as US Route 99W, which served the western portion of the Sacramento Valley from Sacramento to Red Bluff. The bridge is maintained by the California Department of Transportation as State Route 275 and connects West Capitol Avenue and Cabaldon Parkway (formerly Tower Bridge Gateway) in West Sacramento with the Capitol Mall in Sacramento.

In 1982, the Tower Bridge was added to the National Register of Historic Places.

== History ==
=== Developing the bridge ===
The Tower Bridge replaced the 1911 M Street Bridge in Sacramento, which was originally a swing through-truss railroad bridge. Later, 9-foot (2.7 m) roadway sections were added as cantilevered sections on both sides of the existing rail bridge. Sacramento's population more than doubled between 1910 and 1935, rendering the existing bridge inadequate. In 1933, the city realized that it needed a better crossing over the Sacramento River in case of war.

On December 22, 1933, the State of California, Sacramento County, and the Sacramento Northern Railway held a conference to plan the new bridge, with an agreement reached on March 8, 1934. Under the terms of the agreement, Sacramento Northern Railway relinquished its rights to the 1911 M Street Bridge in return for the rights to rail traffic over the new bridge until March 21, 1960, which was the original expiration date of its franchise to operate rail traffic over the 1911 bridge. Construction commenced on July 20, 1934. Road traffic was diverted to the I Street Bridge, and rail traffic was diverted to a temporary timber-and-steel "shoofly" bridge approximately 75 ft (23 m) of the existing M Street Bridge.

=== Design ===
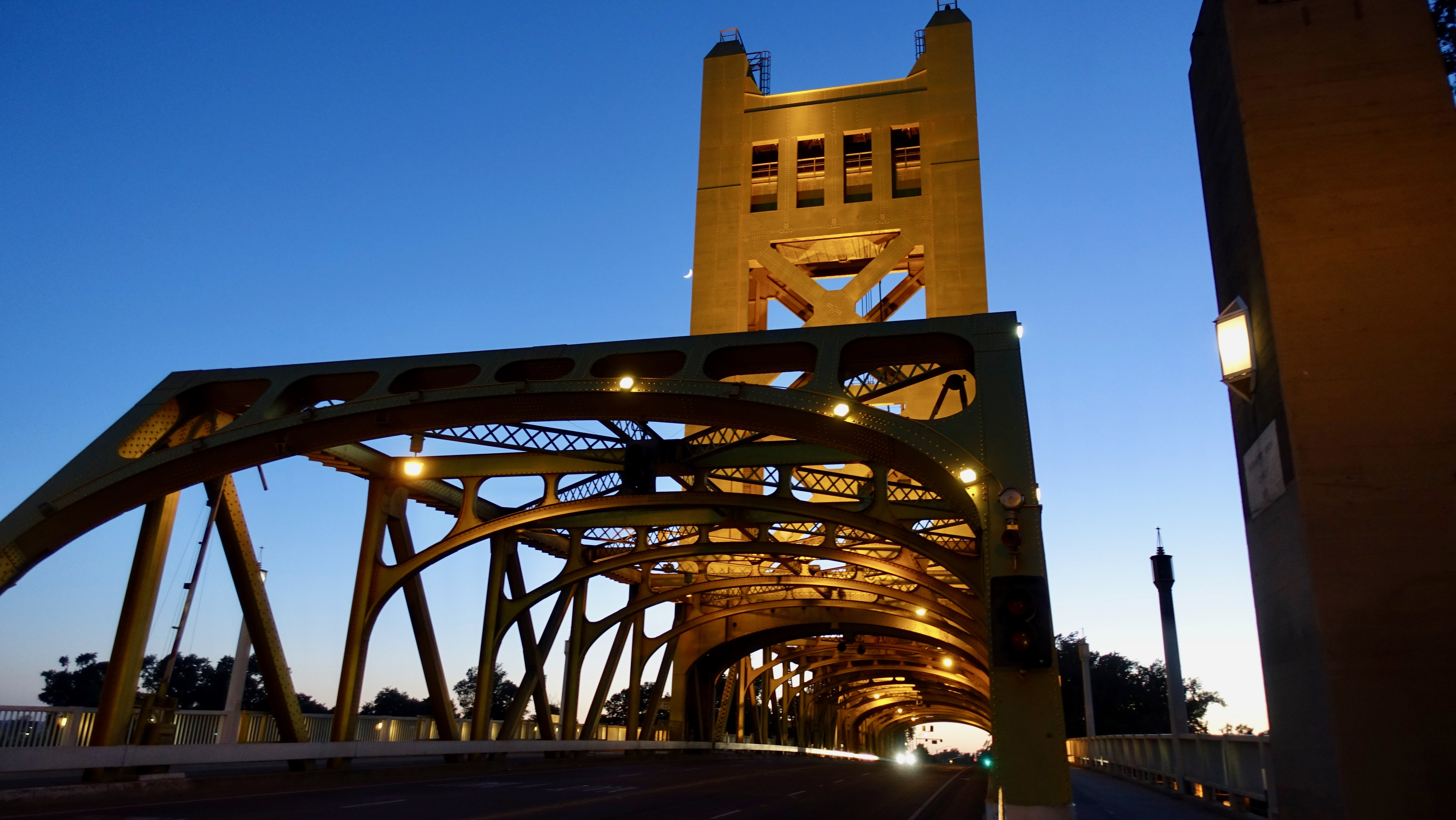
Tower Bridge at dusk.

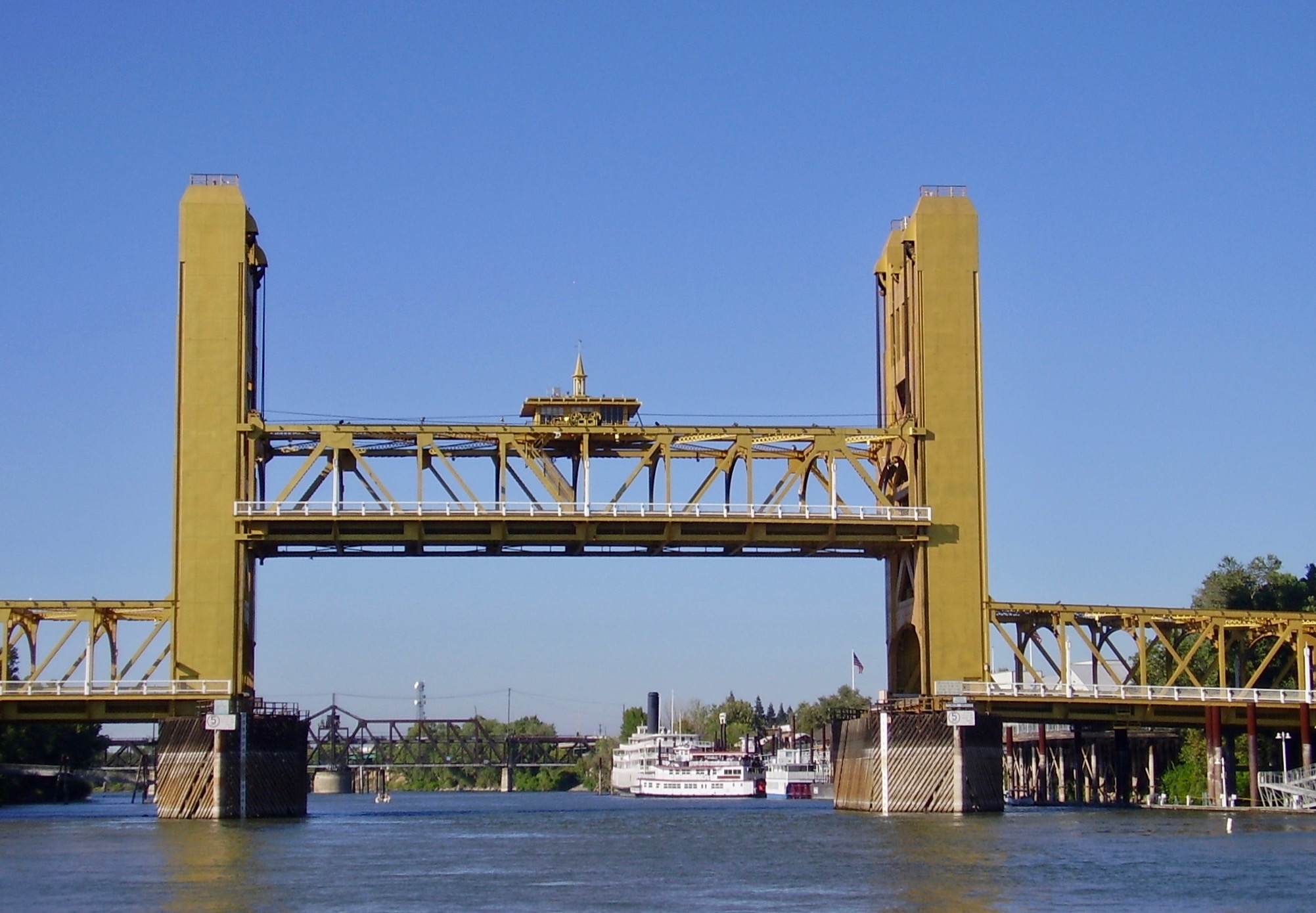
The Tower Bridge raised halfway

Tower Bridge was initially designed with a 52 ft (16 m) wide roadway with sidewalks, with single lanes for cars flanking a large 13-foot (4.0 m) center lane for trains. The towers are 160 ft (49 m). From east to west, the bridge consists of a 30 ft (9.1 m) long girder span, a 167 ft (51 m) long eastern truss approach span, the 209 ft (64 m) long central lift span, a 193 ft (59 m) long western approach span and four 34 ft (10 m) long girder spans. With the draw up, there is 100 feet (30 m) of vertical clearance above high water with a 172-foot (52 m) wide navigation channel between the timber pier fenders. Although the lift span weighs 1,150 short tons (1,040 t), the use of an equal amount of counterweights (located in each tower) means the span is operated with two relatively small 100-horsepower (75 kW) electric motors.

The bridge style represents a rare use of Streamline Moderne architectural styling in a lift bridge, making it an outstanding expression of the social and architectural climate of the period of construction. The lift span towers were sheathed in steel to streamline its appearance. The American Institute of Steel Construction gave the Tower Bridge an honorable mention for its Class B prize bridge award in 1935.

On December 15, 1935, then-governor Frank Merriam dedicated the bridge, and led the inaugural parade across it. 1000 homing pigeons were released to carry the news throughout California. The first train had crossed the bridge on November 7, 1935. The Tower Bridge was the first vertical lift bridge in the California Highway System after it was formally accepted by the state on January 11, 1936.

The final trains ran over the bridge in 1962, and the railroad tracks were removed the following year. With the removal of the tracks, the roadway was restriped for four automobile lanes. Due to the nearby railroad tracks, the grade crossing on the east side is designed to act as a secondary barrier to exclude vehicular traffic while the bridge is raised. When the warning siren sounds, the crossing activates to block traffic until the bridge is safe for use.

=== Repainting the bridge ===
For years, the bridge was painted with a silver aluminum paint under a special work order, but people complained about glare off the bridge. The concrete pylons were initially painted a sky-blue color. In June 1976 as part of Bicentennial projects, it was painted a yellow-ochre color to match the gold leafed cupola on the nearby State Capitol.

In 2001, as the old paint job could hardly be distinguished, residents who lived within 35 mi (56 km) of the capital voted on a new color scheme. Their choices were all-gold; green, gold and silver; or burgundy, silver and gold. The winning choice was all gold, and it was repainted in 2002. However, that did not lessen the bridge's color controversy. Some people complained that the new paint was not as gilded as advertised. Others have suggested that copper would have been a far better color choice, especially in the context of nearby buildings. The new coat is expected to last 30 years.

=== Reinstalling rail ===
As of 1963, the bridge is used for pedestrian and vehicle traffic only. By 2007, regional transportation agencies were considering the possibility of adding trolley traffic across the bridge. In 2020, these plans had changed to call for an extension of SacRT light rail to utilize the deck to provide service to West Sacramento.

== See also ==
- Capitol Mall
- History of Sacramento, California
- Old Sacramento State Historic Park
- List of bridges documented by the Historic American Engineering Record in California
- National Register of Historic Places listings in Sacramento County, California
- California Historical Landmarks in Sacramento County, California
- Sacramento Northern Railroad
