= Unruh Building =

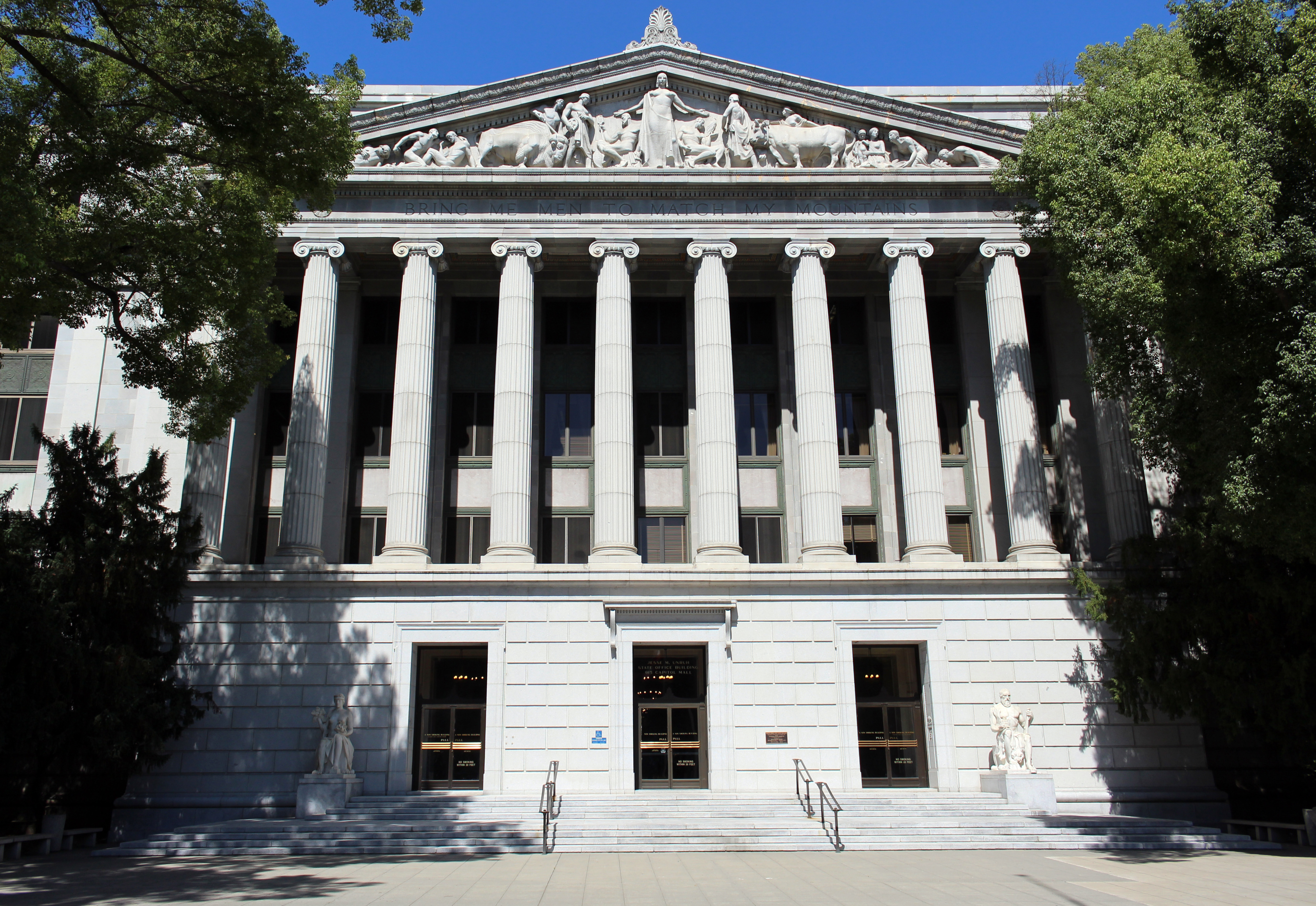
- South facade of the building

- Location within California

General information
- Location: 915 Capitol Mall, Sacramento, California
- Coordinates: 38.5778°N 121.4974°W
- Construction started: 1922
- Completed: 1928

Design and construction
- Architect: Weeks and Day

The Jesse M. Unruh State Office Building is a government of California building in Sacramento, located at the east end of Capitol Mall. It was designed by the architectural firm Weeks and Day.

It was previously known as the California State Office Building or the California State Treasurer's Building, but in 1987, it was renamed as the Jesse M. Unruh Building by Gov. George Deukmejian in honor of Democratic politician Jesse M. Unruh. The state treasurer's main office is still based in the building.

It is located at 915 Capitol Mall and is managed by the California Department of General Services.

The phrase displayed on the south facade, "Bring Me Men To Match My Mountains," is a famous line from the poem The Coming American by Sam Walter Foss.

In September 2008, The Sacramento Bee ranked it the fifth worst state building in Sacramento; its aging interior needed over $10 million in repairs.

Since 1975, El Soldado Memorial has been located beside the Unruh Building, facing the California Capitol.
