= Nisei VFW Post 8985 =

Historic building in California, United States

- Nisei Memorial VFW Post 8985
- U.S. National Register of Historic Places
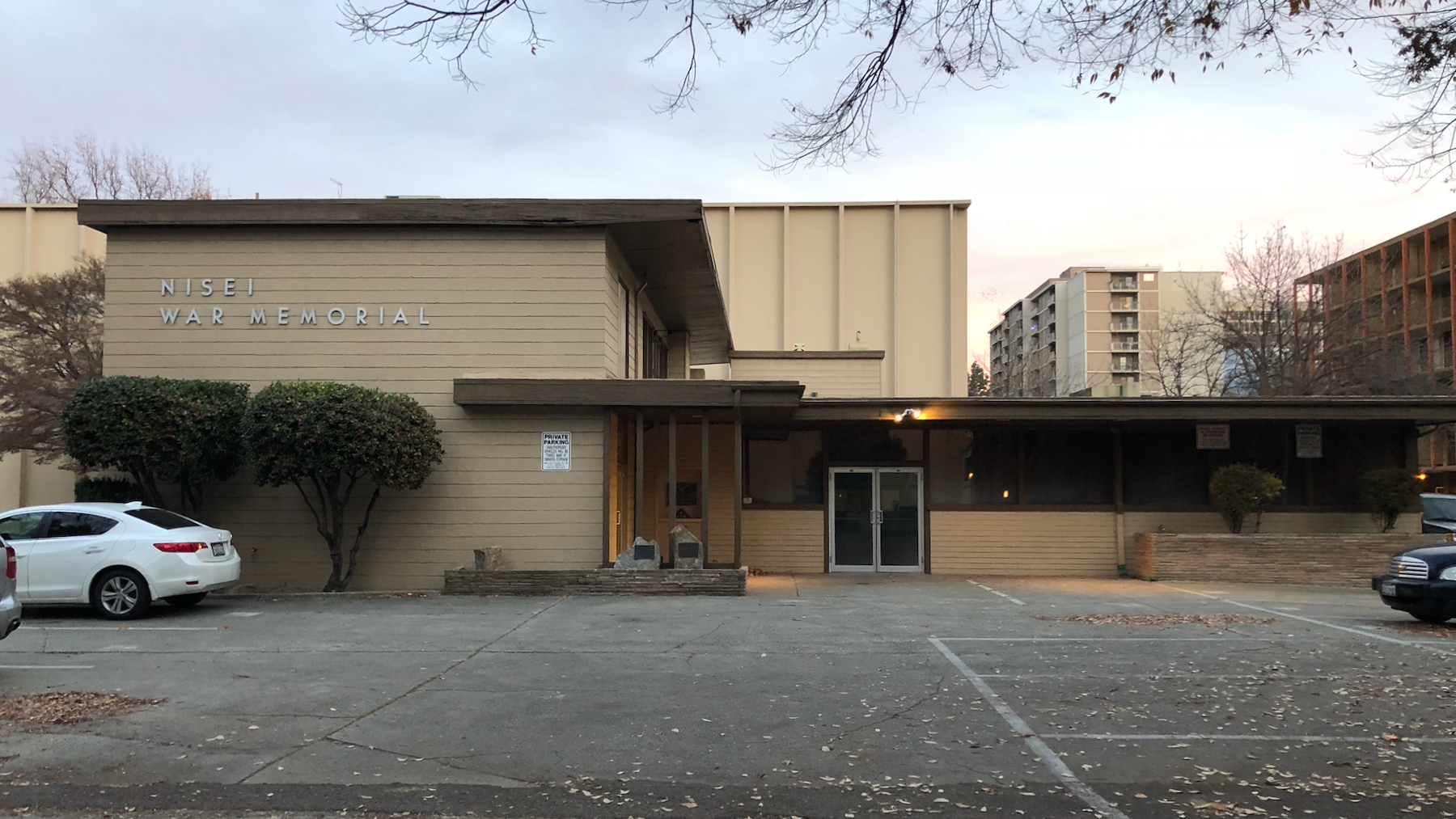

- Location within Sacramento, California Location within California Location within the United States
- Location: 1515 Fourth St. Sacramento, California
- Coordinates: 38°34′35″N 121°30′13″W
- Built: 1951
- Architect: Roy Swedin, AIA
- Architectural style: International Style
- NRHP reference No.: 100005713
- Added to NRHP: October 20, 2020

Nisei Memorial VFW Post 8985 was founded in 1947 by Japanese-American World War II veterans of the 442nd RCT and the Military Intelligence Service in Sacramento, California. Its members would form the first of 14 segregated Nisei VFW posts chartered in California. The post's clubhouse, originally built as a restaurant, was purchased with assistance from the local JACL in 1955, and is now the last remaining property associated with what was once Sacramento's historic Japantown.

== History ==
As Japanese-Americans soldiers returned home from World War II service in Europe and the Pacific, they still faced discrimination despite their exemplary service record. Many VFW and American Legion posts refused to accept Nisei veterans, some even going to the extreme of removing members who previously served in World War I.

Unable to join existing veterans organizations, the Nisei veterans in Sacramento decided to form their own post, appealing to fellow WW2 veteran Alva J. Fleming, a rising star in VFW's district leadership, and receiving a charter to establish a segregated post on 7 February 1947. Fleming would eventually become the VFW state commander for California in 1957 and prove instrumental in founding 14 Nisei VFW posts throughout California, posts 8985 in Sacramento, Monterey post 1629, Gardena post 1961, Garden Grove post 3670, San Fernando post 4140, San Diego post 4851, Hanford post 5869, Oceanside post 6945, Fresno post 8499, Watsonville post 9446, San Francisco post 9879, East Los Angeles post 9902, Los Angeles post 9938, and San Jose post 9970.

Caucasian former 442nd officers sponsored the Nisei American Legion post 1183 in Chicago, while Nisei in the Pacific Northwest would found the independent Nisei Veterans Committee when neither organization would accept them.

Post 8985 initially met at the Sacramento Buddhist Church, then at 4th and O streets, while attempting to raise money to build their own meeting hall. They would eventually buy a parcel down the street on 7th and T streets in 1950, and form a committee to raise the necessary capital to build a meeting hall.

During the war, many African-Americans moved to Sacramento to assist with the war effort and found available housing within the former Japantown mostly vacated due to the incarceration of Japanese-Americans during the war. One of those African-Americans was local entrepreneur Phelix Flowers, who commissioned architects A.E. Kimmel and Roy Swedin to build his Flower Garden restaurant next to the Buddhist church in 1951. The property featured two banquet halls to facilitate African-American members of the Capital City Elk's Lodge 1147, who like their Nikkei neighbors, were prohibited from using the main Elks Tower on Eleventh and J. Unfortunately for Flowers, the business had difficulty finding success and declared bankruptcy in 1954. Post 8985 jumped on the opportunity to purchase the property, and together with proceeds from the sale of the parcel on T and assistance from the JACL, were able to acquire the property in 1955, dedicating the property as the Nisei War Memorial Hall with an honor roll listing the names of their brothers in arms lost during the war.

Prior to the war, over 40 Japantowns existed in California with the highest per capita in Sacramento county with over 8,000 residents comprising 5.6% of the population by 1930. While smaller in total population than in Los Angeles, Sacramento's Japantown was ranked 4th in size in the country. While many of Sacramento's Nikkei population returned to the city after the war, anti-Japanese sentiment remained strong and Sacramento's Japantown never fully recovered as it did in Los Angeles and San Francisco. The death knell for Sacramento's Japantown came in 1957 as Sacramento's city council voted to bulldoze and redevelop the heart of the neighborhood to create what is now Sacramento's Capitol Mall.

As Sacramento prospered in the post-war era, Post 8985 would find the neighboring Buddhist church (and the post's first meeting hall) move south to Riverside, the rest of the once flourishing Japanese community scattered and dispersed throughout the city, and soon found themselves as the sole remaining Nikkei owned property within the boundaries of the former Japantown.

== Present day ==
Post 8985 still serves as a non-profit organization, memorial, and community center, and has evolved into the 21st century serving as a reminder of Sacramento's greater Japanese-American history with a Japanese-American civil liberties monument placed on the outside edge of the property containing interpretive panels, text, and photographs describing Sacramento's Japantown and the internment period. Their membership has also diversified into serving the greater Asian Pacific community and continues to sponsor a boy scout troop and other non-profit organizations.

The property has been nominated for National Register of Historic Places recognition in 2019, and received landmark designation M20-004 by the Sacramento Register of Historic and Cultural Resources in 2021.

== See also ==
- 442nd Infantry Regiment
- Japanese Americans
- Japanese American Memorial to Patriotism During World War II
- Japanese American National Museum
- Military Intelligence Service
