= Capitol Mall =

Major street in Sacramento, California

- Capitol Mall Boulevard
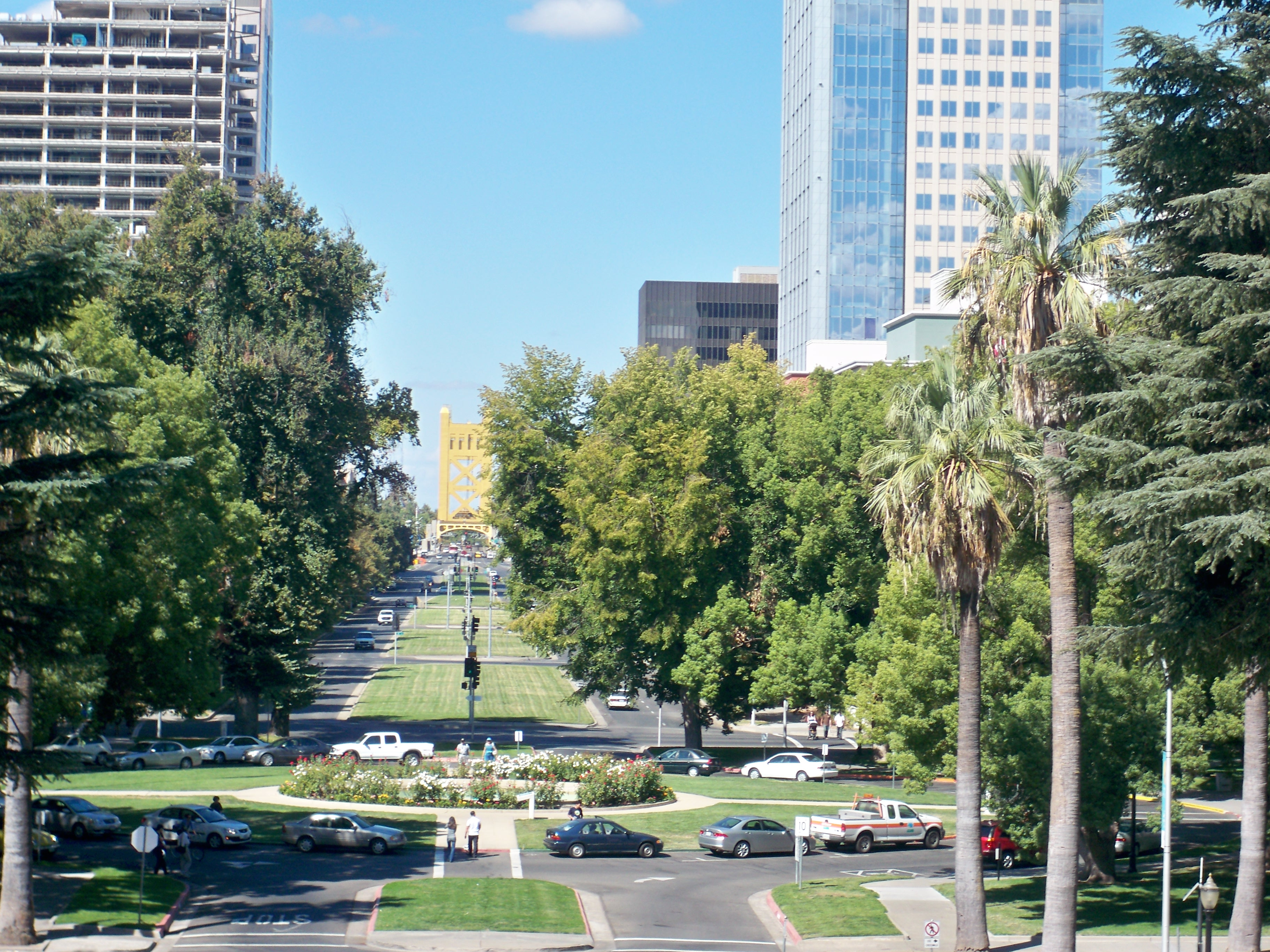
- Westward view of the Capitol Mall
- Interactive map of Capitol Mall
- Maintained by: Sacramento, California
- Coordinates: 38.57865°N 121.50164°W
- West end: Tower Bridge
- East end: 10th Street

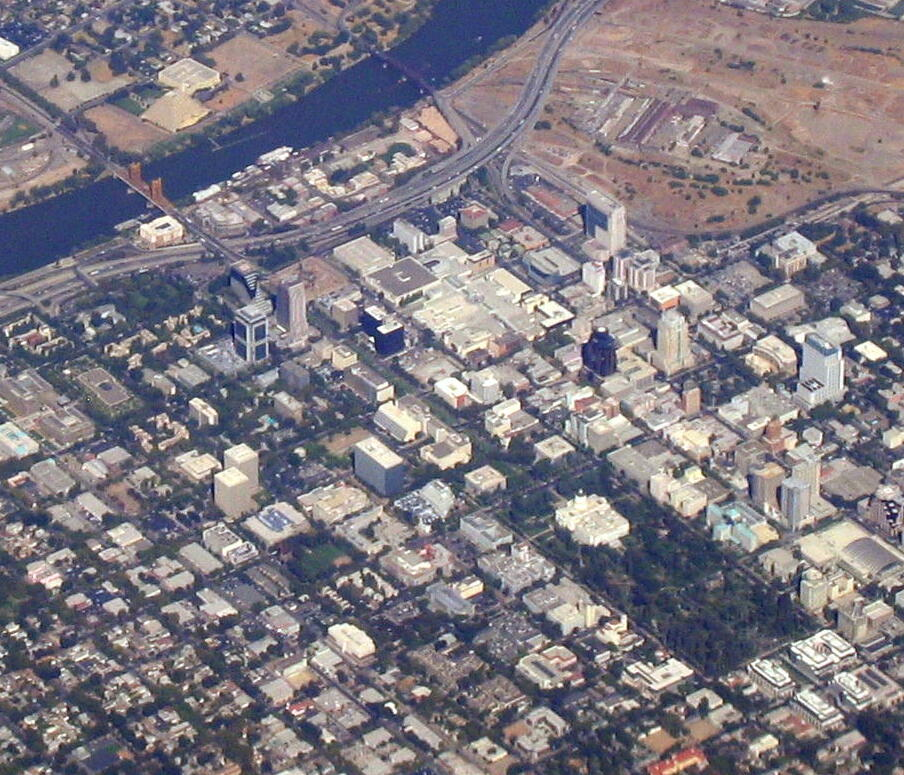
Aerial view of the Mall, Capitol Park in lower right, 2006

The Capitol Mall or Capitol Mall Boulevard is a major street and landscaped parkway in the state capital city of Sacramento, California, United States. Formerly known as M Street, it connects the city of West Sacramento in Yolo County to downtown Sacramento. Capitol Mall begins at the eastern approach to the Tower Bridge, and runs east to the California State Capitol.

== Route description ==
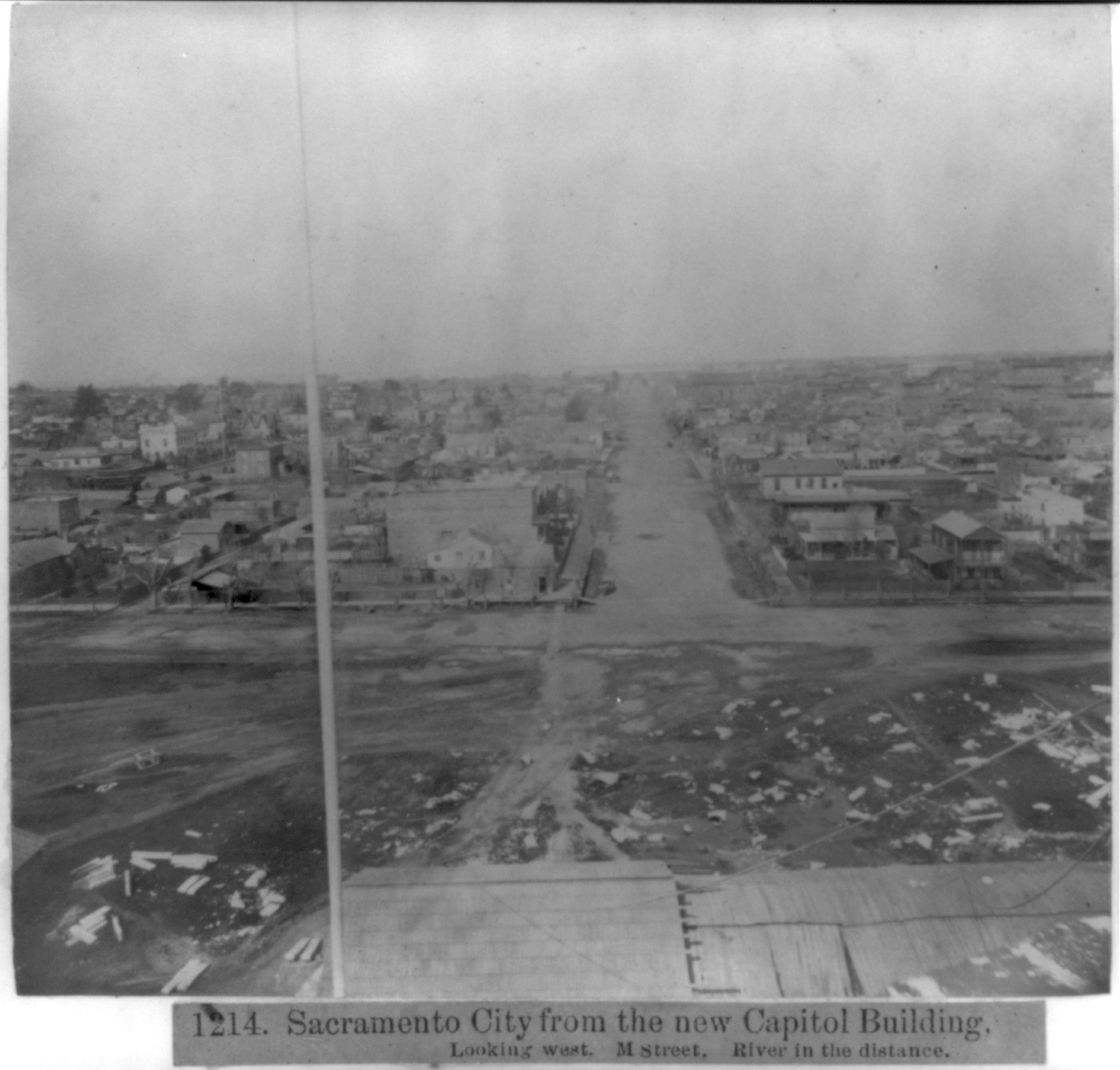
Looking west down M Street from the Capitol, 1866

Capitol Mall begins at the eastern end of Tower Bridge, which crosses the Sacramento River to West Sacramento. It runs eastward past the Riverfront Promenade park, and over the Interstate 5 until the California State Capitol building.

Some of Sacramento's major businesses and law firms are located on the Capitol Mall. Due to Sacramento's street grid system downtown, which predates the construction of the Capitol, Capitol Mall was once known as M Street. It was renamed Capitol Avenue by Governor C. C. Young in 1928.

The Capitol Mall was previously part of State Route 275, but was relinquished to the city in January 2006.

== History ==
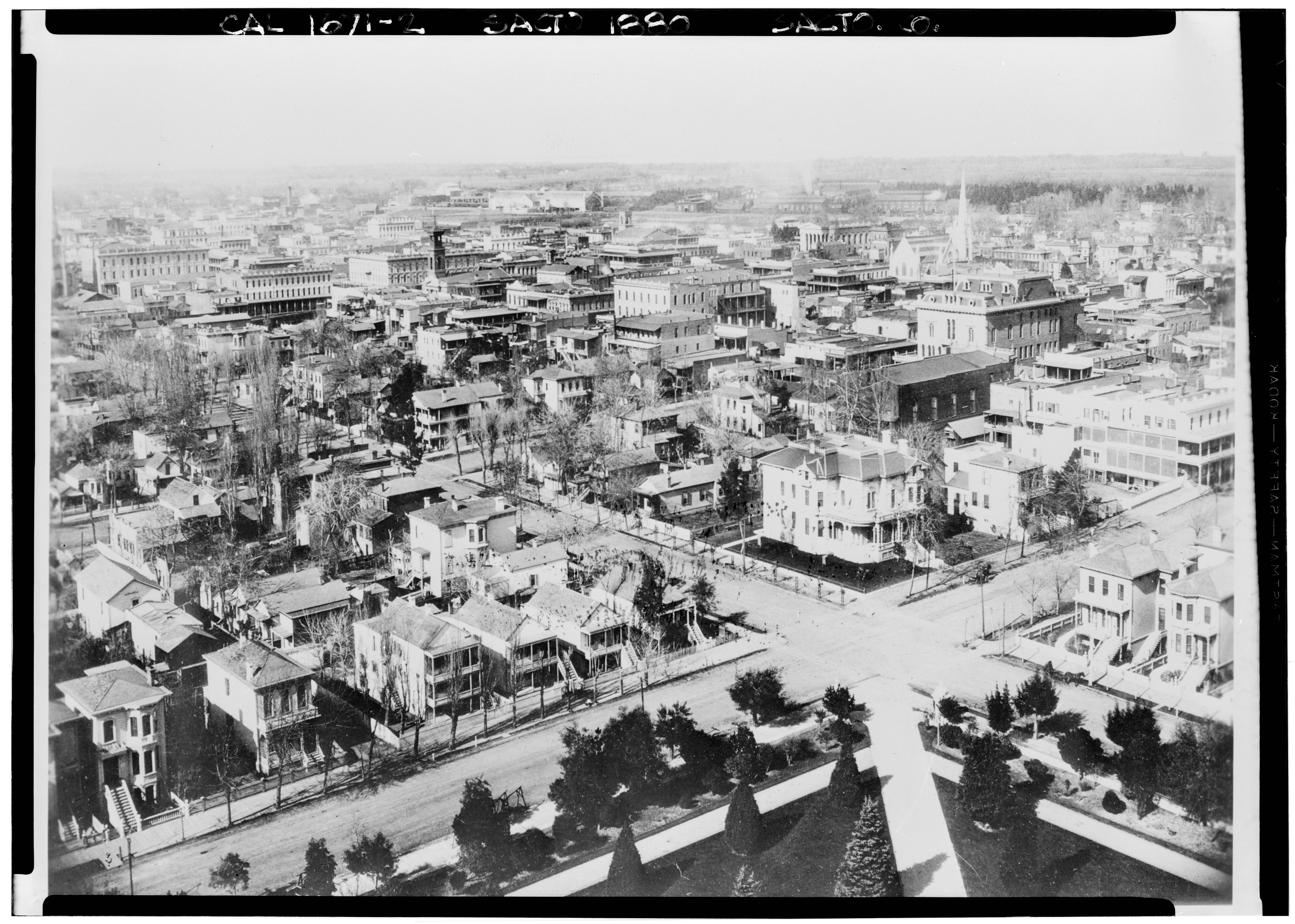
Looking NW at 10th and L streets from the Capitol, c.1900

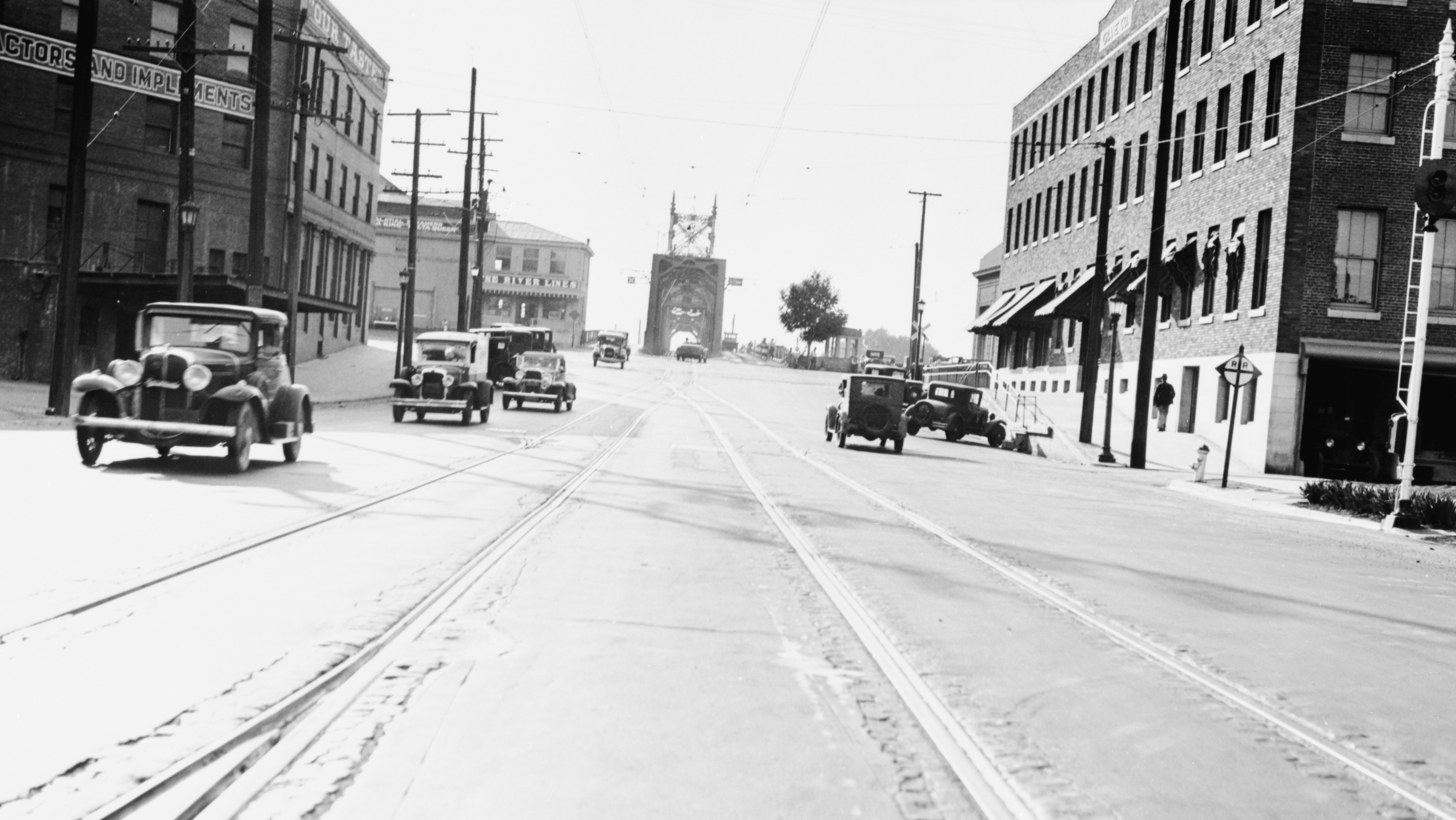
Looking west down M Street towards the old bridge, 1911

Following California's cession by Mexico and entry into the union as a state in 1850, San Jose, Vallejo, and Benicia each briefly served as the state Capitol until the legislature decided Sacramento best suited their needs for the state in 1854. Their initial allocation for the construction of the dedicated Capitol building in 1860 only provided for a 4 block parcel of land bordered by L, N, 10th, and 12th streets.

Previously just another minor lettered street, M Street suddenly became a focal point for visitors to the Capitol as they arrived at the Central Pacific Railroad station or the docks via riverboat in Old Sacramento. The advent of the automobile and the new Legislative Route 6 leading to the Capitol further emphasized how the appearance of the Capitol from the riverfront reflected California's fortunes, as urban planning advocate Charles Mulford Robinson petitioned the city and the state to emulate Pierre L’Enfant's ideals for the National Mall in Washington, D.C. in 1907.

Although the city acquired the two additional blocks west of the Capitol for the construction of State Office Building No. 1 and the Library and Courts Building in 1913, the area between 9th street and the river continued to be developed with residential, commercial, and community properties, including Sacramento's historic Japantown, which spanned M street at 4th street from K to P streets, clogging the view of the Capitol such that the noted city planner Werner Hegemann wrote, "that even walking on the sidewalks of “M” street the Capitol Building cannot be seen," and that clearing such, "is of the greatest importance for the future of Sacramento."

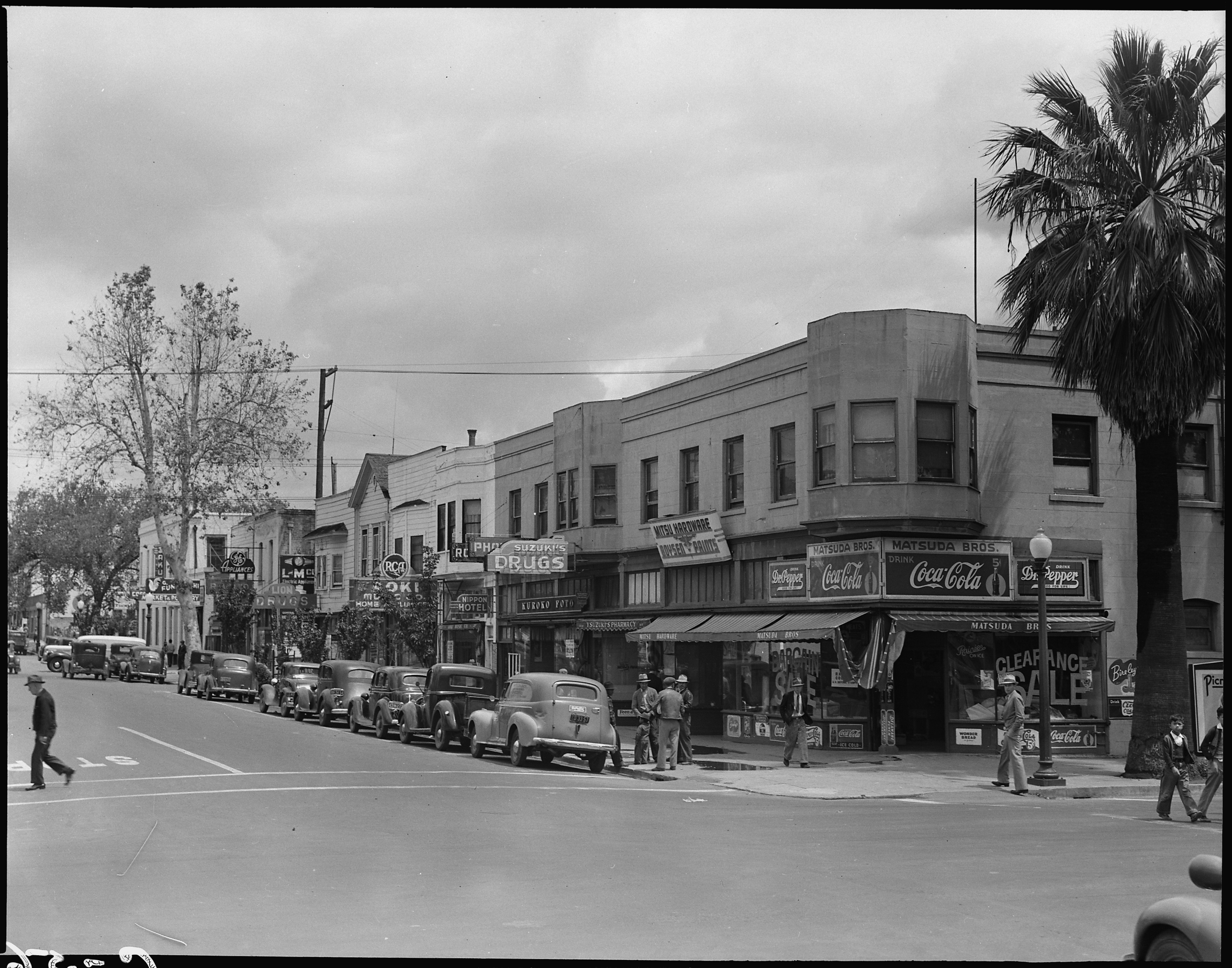
Corner of Fourth and Capitol, 1942

Governor C. C. Young renewed efforts for the widening of M Street into a grand mall to create “the Pennsylvania Avenue of California” in 1929. He also advocated for renaming M Street as Capitol Avenue, and building a new, larger bridge to replace the old M Street railroad bridge over the river with a combination rail and automobile bridge that would become the Sacramento's iconic Tower Bridge, forming a grand western gateway to the mall.

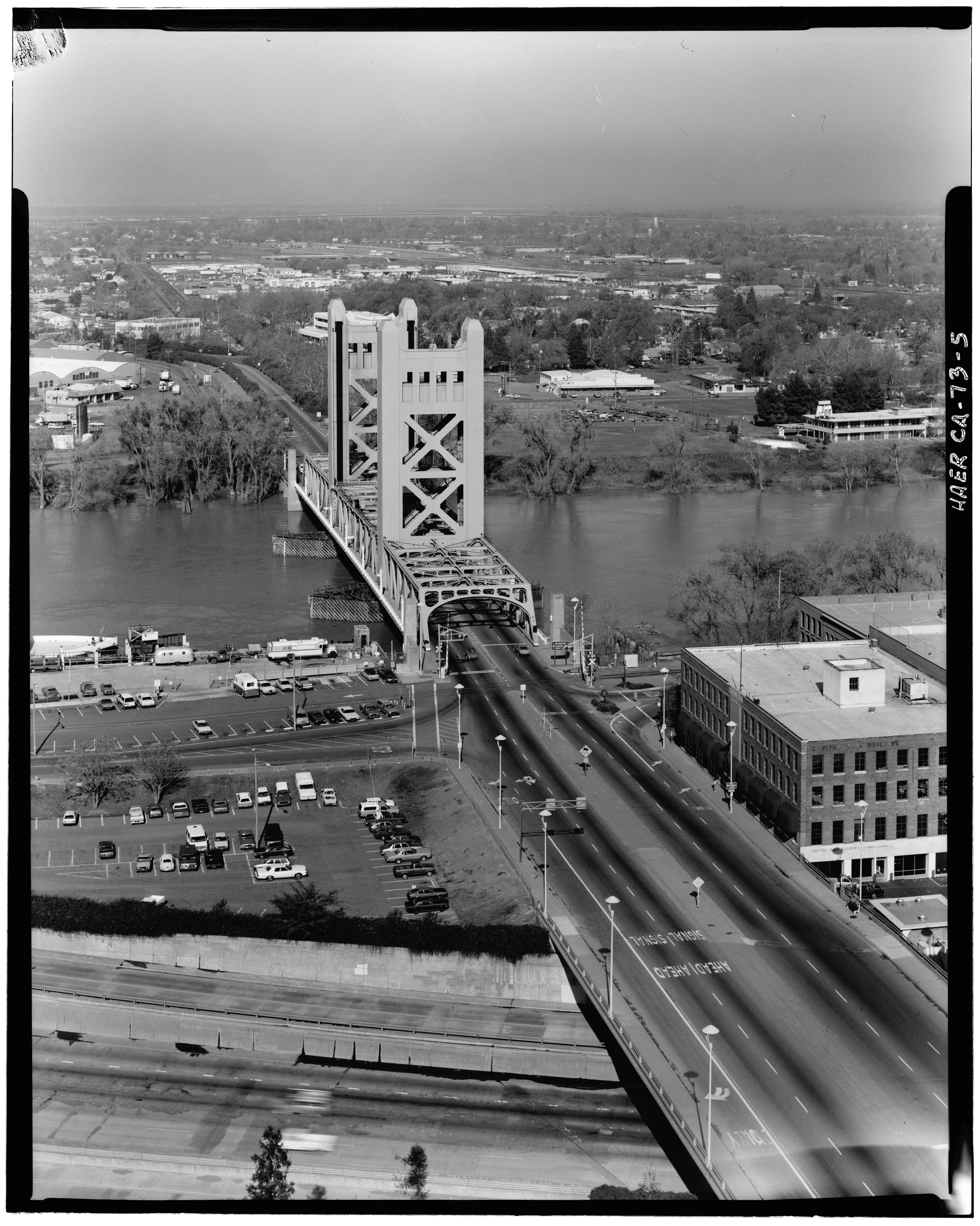
Interstate 5 passing below grade underneath Capitol Mall, 1985

Mall proposals were placed on the backburner during the wars, and despite the fact much of Sacramento's Japantown was decimated by the evacuation and incarceration of Japanese Americans during the war, California's population doubled due to its strong wartime defense industry production, many who moved into the vacated Japanese areas, especially those who were prohibited from finding housing elsewhere else due to racial housing covenants, often far exceeding the capacity for those properties as affluent residents moved out to the growing suburburan migration of the 1950s.

That migration and federal investment in urban renewal during the post war era jumpstarted the city's attention towards finally creating the Mall, if only to give government the excuse to seize the overcrowed ethnic ghettos through eminent domain, such as what was then called Sacramento's "West End" filled with minorities with no place else to go.

Sacramento's city council approved a plan to acquire land and create a Civic Improvement District around the Capitol all the way down to the river in 1947, recommending a 40 foot building setback from Capitol Avenue. The Sacramento Redevelopment Agency (SRA) was created in 1950 to deal with the challenge of enforcing the State's wishes, acquiring approximately 15 square blocks for the Capitol Mall Project, and publicly demolishing an 1870's private home acquired through eminent domain by the agency in a special ceremony in what was publicized as a “slum clearance project,” and opening those parcels up to private investment compatible with the State's mall concept.

By 1961, the initial plan to create a 52 foot grassy median separating 2 wide streets with an 8 footwide landscape setback planted with Linden trees for a total of 180 feet between the buildings north and south of the Mall was underway. J. W. Wilson from the State Division of Highways was assigned as the design engineer for the project with Donald Van Riper as the landscape architect. Unfortunately, an earlier plan to include a round-about encircling a monument or obelisk on the western end of The Mall was abandoned due to the unanticipated construction of Interstate 5 to run along the river through the city, and deliberately built below grade so not to interrupt the clear line of sight between the Capitol and the Tower Bridge. Both the mall and the interstate would be completed by 1965 and aesthetically remains today much as it did then.

== Capitol Mall Boulevard landmarks ==
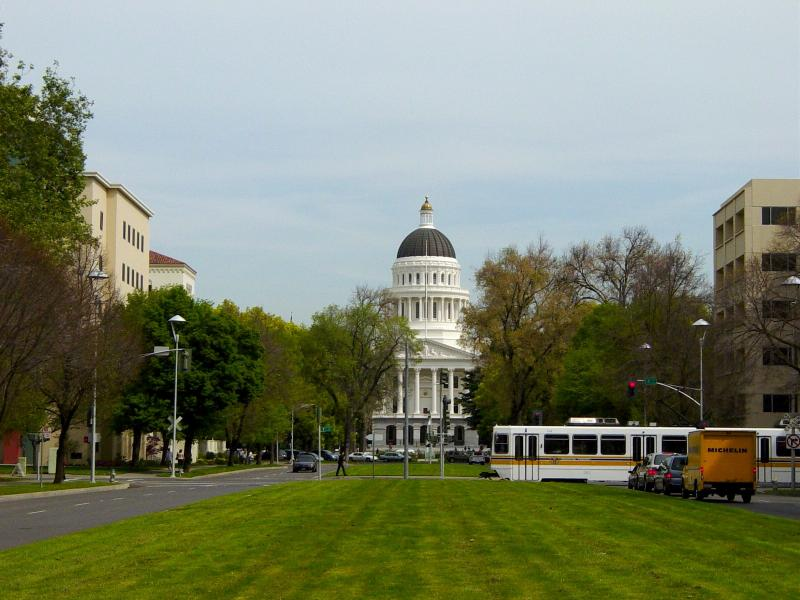
Eastward view of the Capitol Mall, towards the Capitol

Landmarks on the Capitol Mall, from the west (Tower Bridge and Sacramento River) to the east (California State Capitol), include:

=== 1 Capitol Mall ===
Located at 1 Capitol Mall, Drexel University Sacramento is the California campus of renowned Drexel University, based in Philadelphia. It is located near the iconic Tower Bridge, between the Sacramento River and the Mall's crossing over Interstate 5.

=== 100 Capitol Mall ===
Located at 100 Capitol Mall near the Tower Bridge, the 242 room 'Embassy Suites Sacramento - Riverfront Promenade' is a hotel popular with tourists, due to its proximity to Old Town in the Old Sacramento State Historic Park and the Riverfront Promenade park along the Sacramento River.

=== 300 Capitol Mall ===
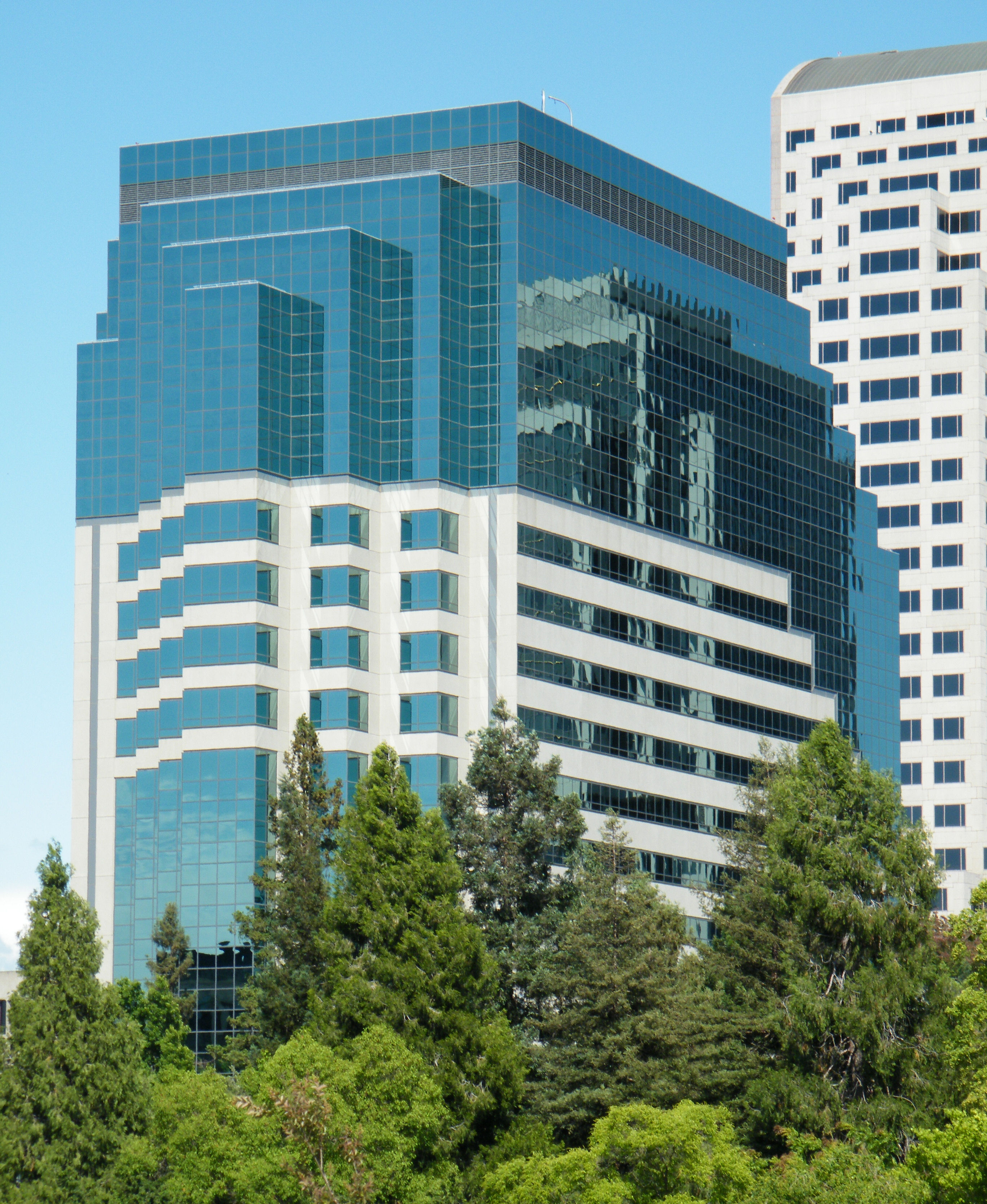
300 Capitol Mall office tower.

Located at the gateway to downtown, the busy intersection of 3rd Street and Capitol Mall, 300 Capitol Mall stands 18 stories high with 383,238 square feet of rentable area. The tower was designed by Daniel, Mann, Johnson & Mendenhall (DMJM) and completed in 1984.

=== 301 Capitol Mall ===
301 Capitol Mall is the site of the former home of the Sacramento Union newspaper. Construction began here in 2006 for The Towers on Capitol Mall I & II, two planned 53-story and massive 615 feet (187 m) mixed-use towers. The project had been on hold since January 2007 due to liens being filed against developer.

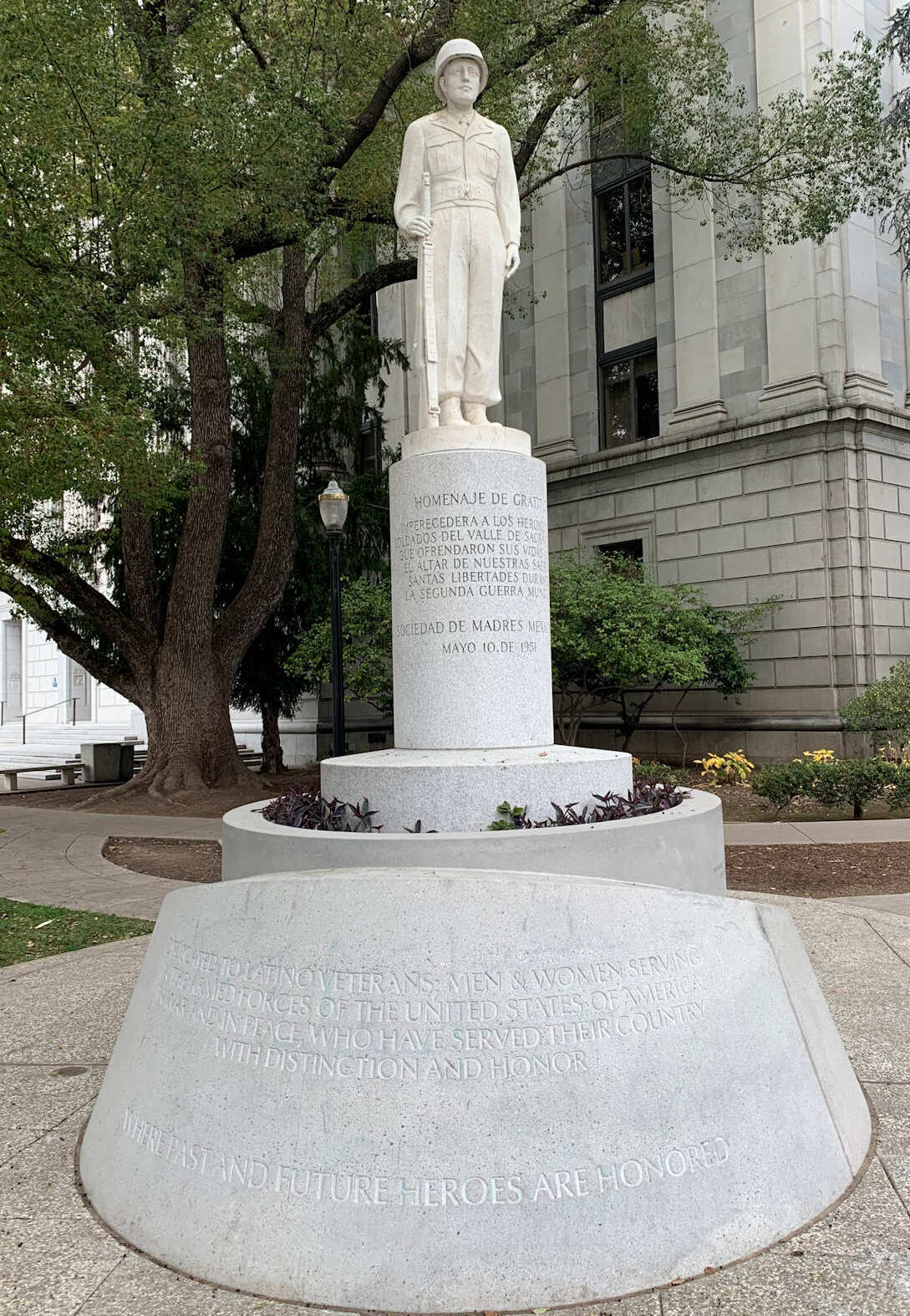
El Soldado Memorial

=== 400 Capitol Mall — Wells Fargo Center ===
Located at 400 Capitol Mall, the 'Wells Fargo Center' is currently the tallest building in Sacramento. It is 429 feet (131 m) high, and has 33 stories, with 29 above the ground floor lobby and 3 below. The skyscraper won the BOMA Building of the Year award in 1994. A museum is located in the lobby, dedicated to the history of Wells Fargo Bank in the Sacramento area. Located within the Wells Fargo Center: Il Fornaio, a popular restaurant; and Price Waterhouse Coopers, a major tenant.

=== 500 Capitol Mall — BMO Tower ===
500 Capitol Mall, also known as the 'BMO Tower' (formerly the 'Bank of the West Tower'), is a 25-story 433,508-square-foot (40,274.2 m^{2}) high-rise on Capitol Mall in downtown Sacramento with a 10-level, 800 stall parking garage. The building consists of a 5-story atrium/lobby, ground floor retail, office space, and a 2-level penthouse restaurant or meeting facility. The structure has a steel frame and features a granite curtain wall with stone-on-precast and stone-on-truss panels on the exterior. The building, opened for business and welcomed its first tenant on May 26, 2009.

=== California State Capitol ===
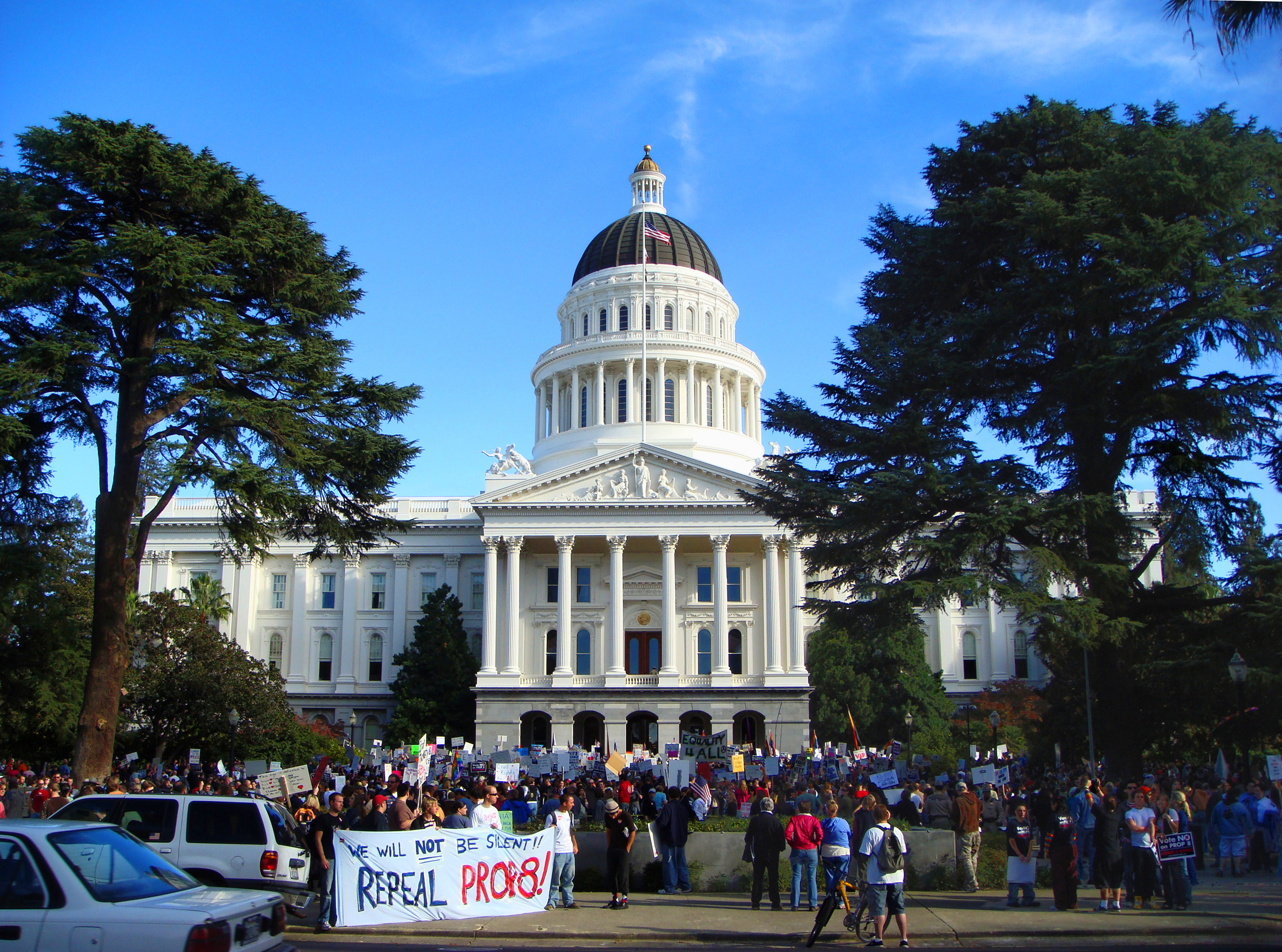
The west entrance of the Capitol from the Mall.

At the eastern terminus of the Capitol Mall, the landmark California State Capitol stands. It and the surrounding grounds contain the California State Capitol Museum. The Beaux-Arts and Neoclassical style building with dome was under construction from 1860 to 1874. The capitol and grounds are a California Historical Landmark, a National Historic Landmark District, and on the National Register of Historic Places in Sacramento County, California.

== Public transportation ==
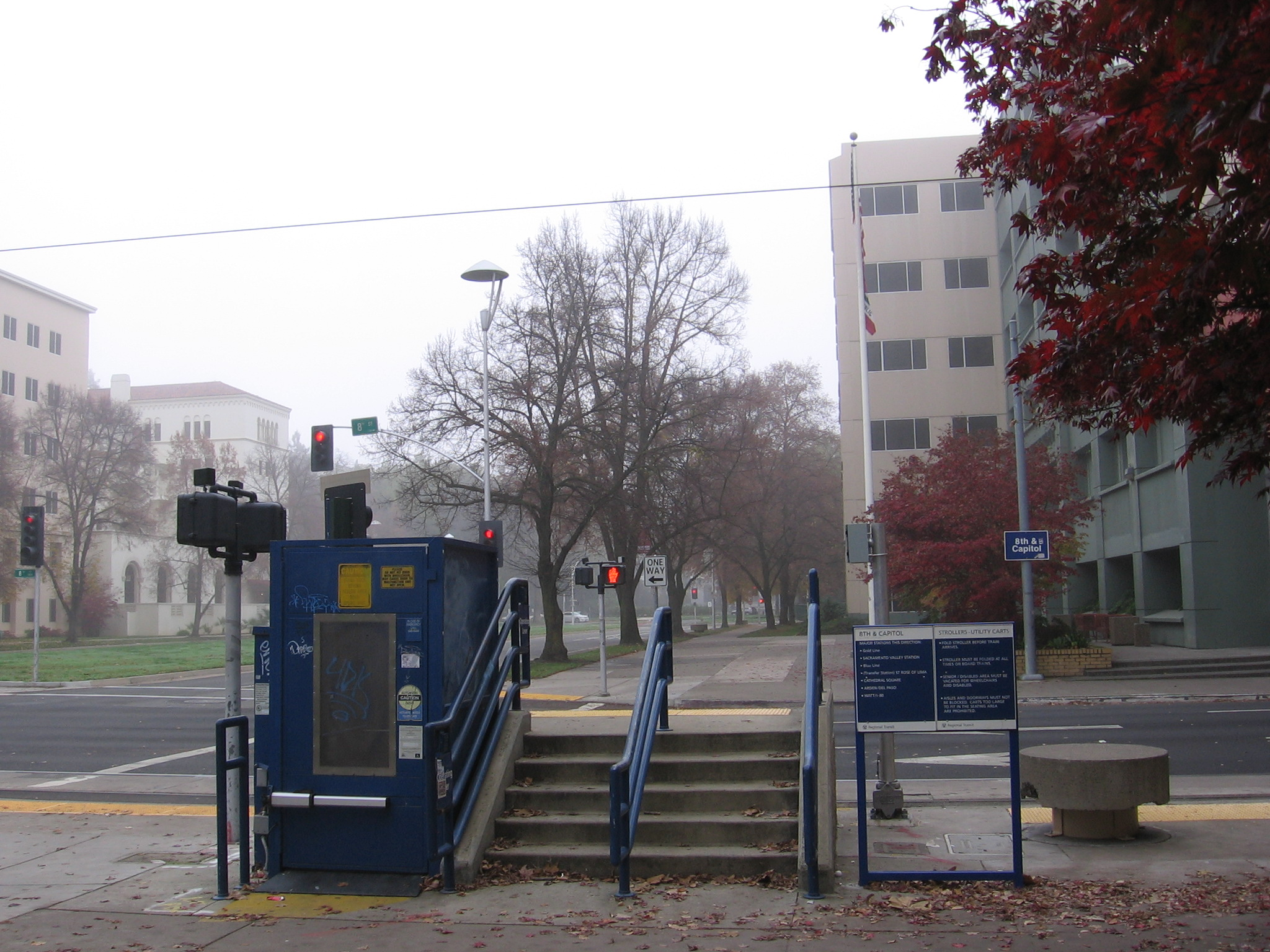
8th & Capitol Stop for northbound Sacramento RT light rail lines.

Sacramento Regional Transit District—RT serves public transport to/from and along the Capitol Mall. RT serves the city of Sacramento, and much of the northern portion of Sacramento County.

Light rail

RT has two light rail stops located on the Capitol Mall. The 7th & Capitol Stop is only for southbound trains, while the 8th & Capitol Stop is only for northbound trains. The two stops serve all three RT light rail routes: the Gold Line, Blue Line, and Green Line.

Buses

There are also bus stops located on the Capitol Mall operated by RT, with service between 5:00 a.m. and 9:00 p.m. daily. The bus fleet is powered by compressed natural gas.

== Major intersections ==
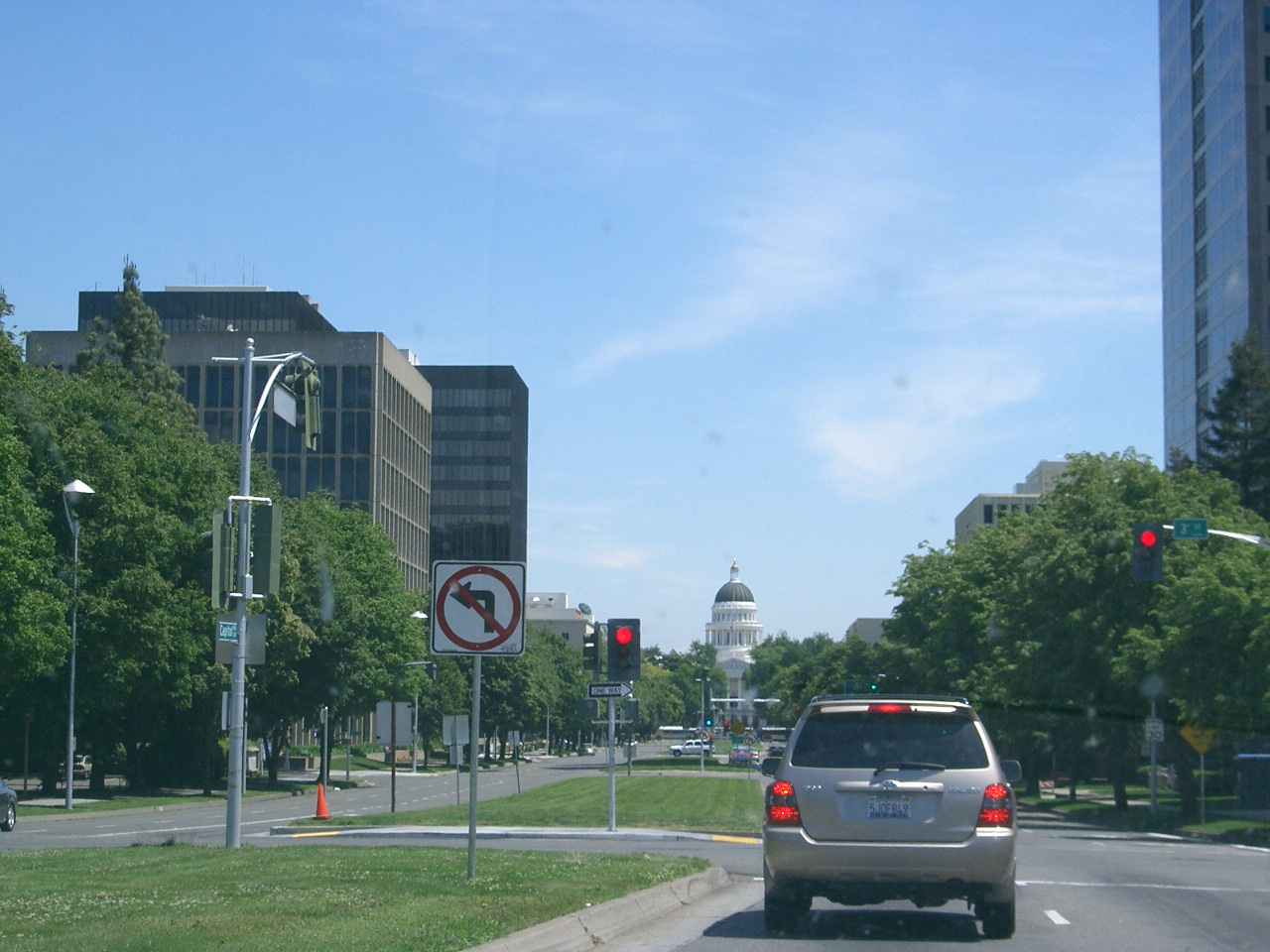
Eastbound along the verdant Capitol Mall.

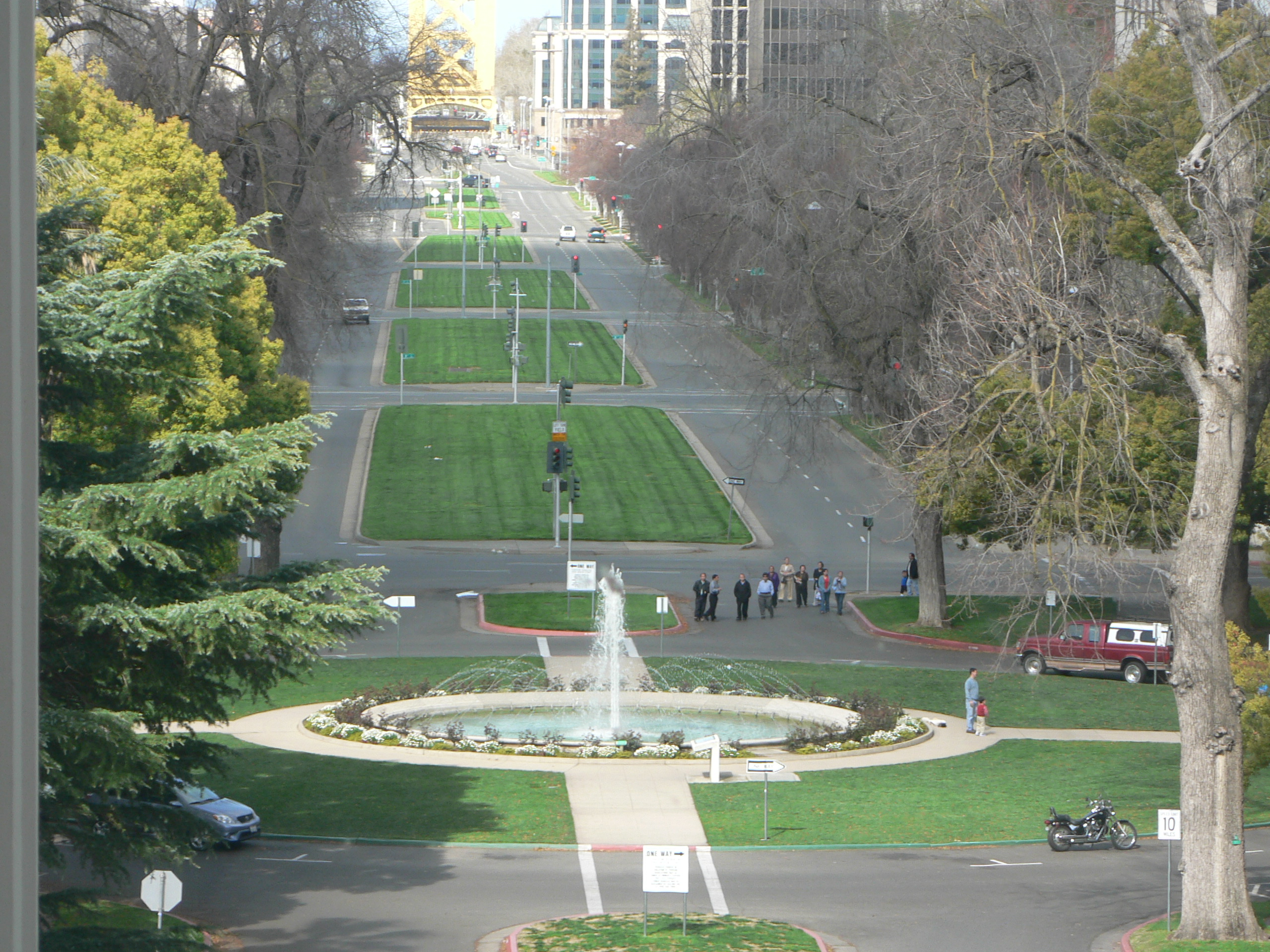
Looking west along the Mall towards the Tower Bridge

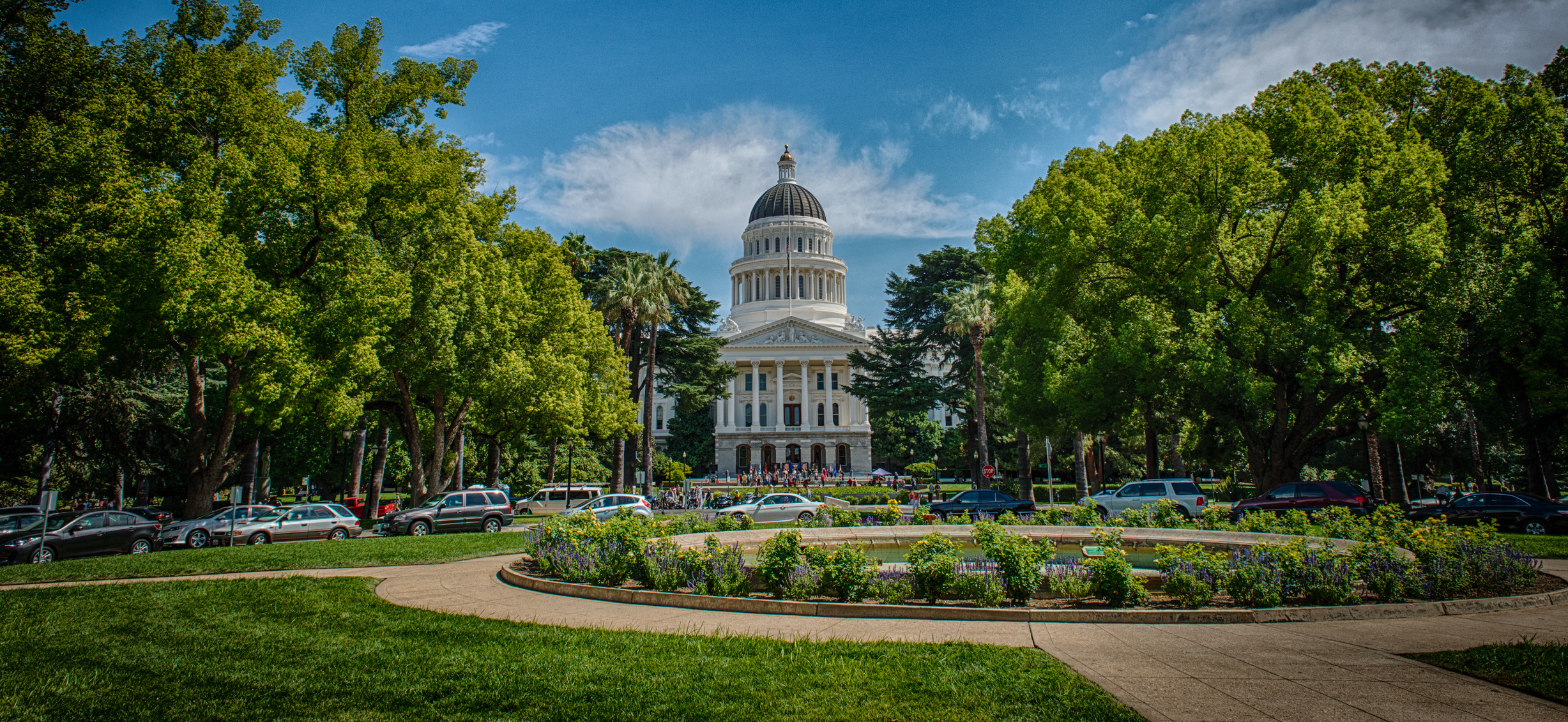
Roundabout at the eastern terminus of the Mall

The entire route is in Sacramento, Sacramento County.

mi	km	Destinations	Notes
0.0	0.0	Tower Bridge (SR 275 west) to I-80 west – West Sacramento	Continuation beyond Neasham Circle; drawbridge; serves Sutter Health Park; connects to US 50 west; former US 40 west / US 99W north; eastern terminus of SR 275
0.0	0.0	Neasham Circle – Old Sacramento	Western terminus; no left turn eastbound
		L Street	Closed; former westbound entrance only interchange
		N Street	Closed; former eastbound exit only interchange; accessible via 3rd Street
0.2	0.32	3rd Street	One-way southbound; former SR 24 west / SR 99 south; connects to I-5
0.3	0.48	5th Street to I-5 / SR 99 / SR 70 – Marysville, Old Sacramento	No left turn westbound; former SR 16 west / SR 24 east / SR 99 north
0.5	0.80	7th Street	One-way southbound; former SR 16 east / former US 40 east / US 99W south
0.6	0.97	8th Street	One-way northbound
0.6	0.97	9th Street	One-way southbound; former eastern terminus of SR 275; west end of roundabout
0.7	1.1	10th Street	Eastern terminus; one-way northbound; east end of roundabout; all eastbound traffic must turn left
1.000 mi = 1.609 km; 1.000 km = 0.621 mi: Closed/former; Incomplete access

== See also ==
- Old Sacramento State Historic Park — Historic district, 2 blocks north of the Mall
- China Slough - Sacramento's Chinatown, cleared to make way for the train station, further inundated by the Mall
- Crocker Art Museum — former residence of Edwin B. Crocker, 2 blocks south of the Mall
- Nisei VFW Post 8985 - sole survivor of Sacramento's former Japantown, cleared to make way for the Mall
- Leland Stanford Mansion - formerly residence of Governor Leland Stanford, 1 block south of the Mall
- Sacramento Convention Center Complex - modern convention complex rebuilt in 2019, 1 block north of the Mall
- List of tallest buildings in Sacramento
