= El Soldado Memorial =

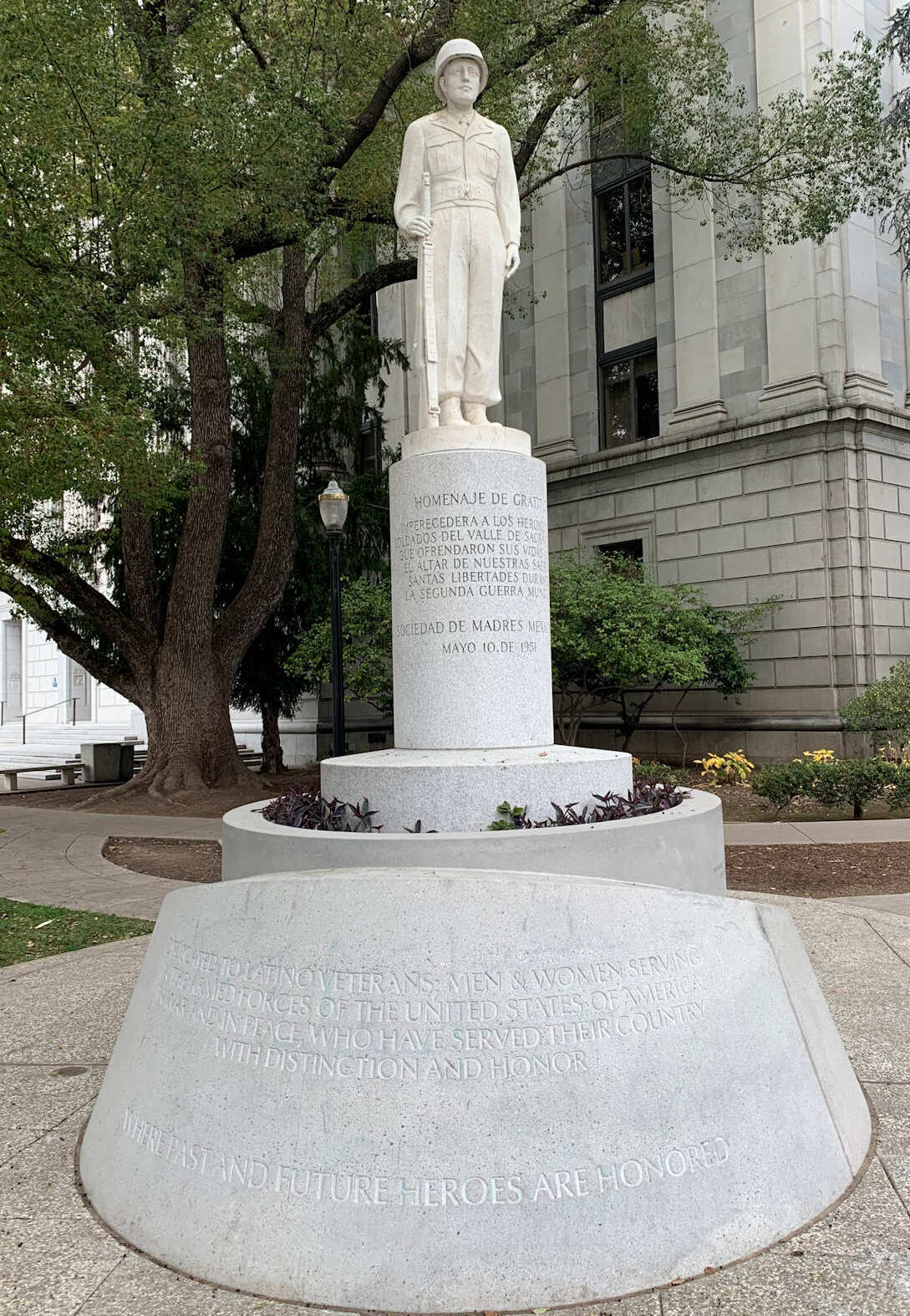
- Location: Capitol Mall, Sacramento, California
- Material: Marble
- Completion date: 1951
- Dedicated to: Mexican-American & Chicano veterans from California

The California Mexican-American Veterans Memorial (Spanish: Memorial a los Veteranos Mexicoamericanos de California), more commonly known as El Soldado Memorial (Monumento El Soldado), is a marble war memorial in Sacramento, California, honoring the contributions of California's Mexican-American/Chicano veterans. It is located on the Capitol Mall, directly across from the California State Capitol and beside the Unruh Building.

== History ==
In 1948, a group of Mexican/Chicano mothers formed La Sociedad de Madres Mexicanas (the Society of Mexican Mothers) with the goal of creating a memorial for their sons and husbands who served and gave their lives in World War II. The group held a series of grassroots fundraisers, including selling tamales, to raise money for the memorial. The monument originally honored only the Chicano/Mexican-American veterans from the Sacramento Valley that served during World War II, but was later expanded to all Californian Chicano/Mexican-American veterans of all wars.

The memorial was sculpted in Italy, to a cost of $4,000, and erected at the former Sacramento Mexican-American Center on May 10, 1951 (Mexican Mothers’ Day). It stood there until 1975, when it was moved to its current location across from the California State Capitol. In 1985, Assembly Member Richard Polanco sponsored legislation that ceded the state grounds to the memorial and authorized its expansion.

In 2016, the monument was restored and its grounds were expanded.

== Inscription ==
The Spanish inscription on the monument reads:

HOMENAJE DE GRATIDUD

IMPERECEDERA A LOS HEROICOS
SOLDADOS DEL VALLE DE SACRAMENTO
QUE OFRENDARON SUS VIDAS ANTE
EL ALTAR DE NUESTRAS SACRO-
SANTAS LIBERTADES DURANTE
LA SEGUNDA GUERRA MUNDIAL

SOCIEDAD DE MADRES MEXICANAS
MAYO 10 DE 1951

The inscription translated into English reads:

Homage in Gratitude

Everlasting to the Heroic
Soldiers of the Valley of Sacramento
That Offered Their Lives Before
The Altar of Our Sacro-
Sanct Liberties During
The Second World War

Society of Mexican Mothers
May 10 of 1951
