= Eagle Theatre (Sacramento, California) =

- The reconstructed Eagle Theatre in Old Town Sacramento in its exact historic location

- Location in Sacramento Eagle Theatre (Sacramento, California) (California) Eagle Theatre (Sacramento, California) (the United States)
- 38.58369°N 121.50514°W

History
- Built: 1849

Site notes
- Architect(s): Hubbard, Brown & Co.

California Historical Landmark
- Reference no.: 595

The Eagle Theatre in Gold Rush-era Sacramento was the first permanent theatre to be built in the state of California. Established in 1849 this relatively small structure was originally wood-framed and canvas-covered with a tin roof and a packed earth floor. The theatre was flooded on Jan 4, 1850.

Located at 925 Front Street, it was one of the earliest structures in the new city. It featured many different types of entertainment for a rough crowd of wild west pioneers and gold miners from the small but rapidly growing area. Tickets to the theater could be obtained at a nearby saloon for two dollars and three dollars, most likely the Round Tent Saloon then located just to the south of the theatre.

Today the theatre is owned by California Department of Parks and Recreation and is administered by the California State Railroad Museum as part of the Old Sacramento State Historic Park.

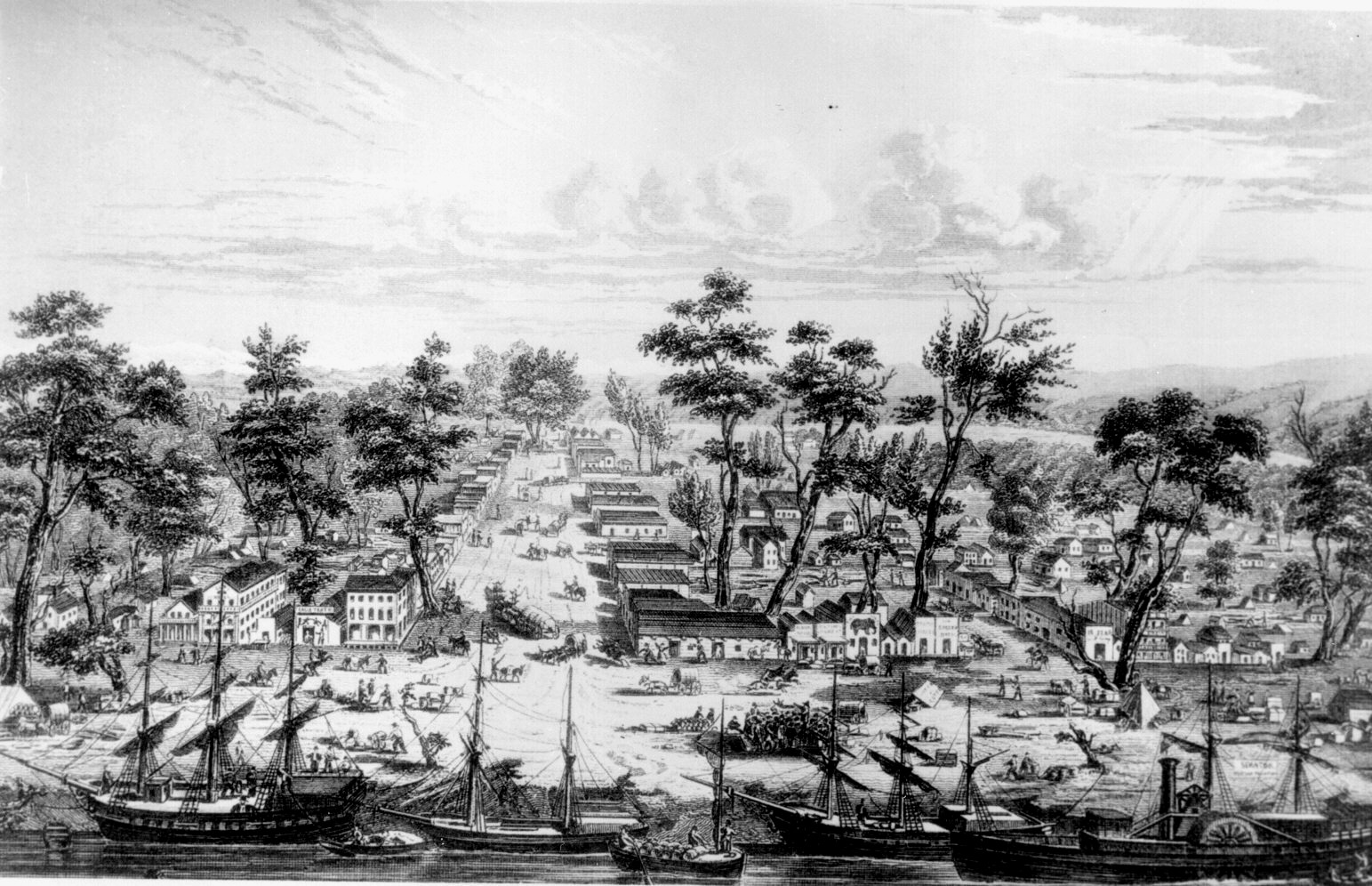
Sacramento in 1855 showing the original Eagle Theatre in the grouping of buildings to the left.
