= The Firehouse Restaurant =

Restaurant in Sacramento, California

Coordinates: 38°34′53.9142″N 121°30′18.77″W

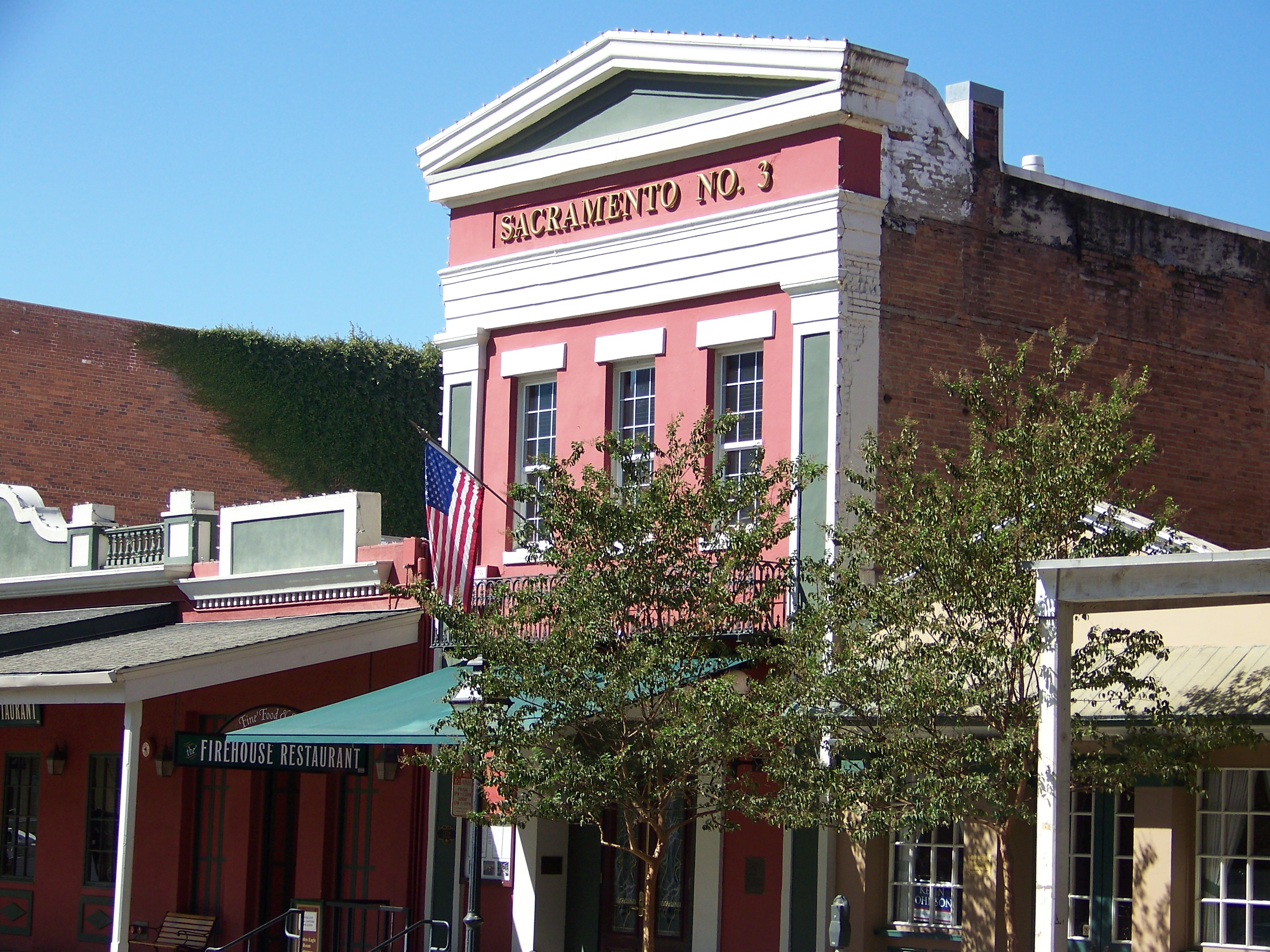
- Type: Private
- Industry: Restaurants
- Headquarters: Old Sacramento, Sacramento, California, USA
- Products: Food services
- Website: FirehouseOldSac.com

The Firehouse Restaurant is a fine dining establishment located in historic Old Sacramento, housed in an 1853 redbrick firehouse. It opened as a restaurant in 1960.

== History ==
In 1850, Sacramento organized California's first fire department. After two major fires resulted in extensive damage to the area, a new brick firehouse was built in 1853 to house the fire chief and volunteer crew of Engine Company No. 3.

A succession of owners and tenants were custodians of the building until its purchase by Newton Cope in 1959. Mr. Cope along with his brothers and partners, Carl Cope and Lawrence Cope, undertook a major renovation on the firehouse building, converting it into a small bar and restaurant reminiscent of the Gold Rush Era. This was the first building renovation of the new Historic District. The Firehouse was later designated as a historical landmark.

The Firehouse Restaurant officially opened for business in 1960. The restaurant has since attracted governors, politicians, diplomats, sports and entertainment celebrities, international business people, tourists and locals. The Firehouse wine list represents more than 2,100 individual labels and its wine cellar houses more than 18,000 bottles.

As the governor of California, Ronald Reagan held both of his inaugural dinners at The Firehouse.

In 1999 Harvego Enterprises purchased the restaurant.

The restaurant has a staircase which was previously used in the Preston Castle (now the Preston School of Industry) until it was closed and portions of the castle sold at auction.

In 2004, the building was used as a set in the 2005 film, Her Minor Thing.

In 2009, Amgen held a press conference at the restaurant to announce that the city would be included in the 2010 Amgen Tour of California.

The Sacramento chapter of The Salvation Army held its first meeting at the Firehouse Restaurant on May 19, 1885. On May 19, 2010, the Firehouse Restaurant hosted the chapter's 125th anniversary meeting.

== Awards & recognitions ==
- “Award of Excellence” from Wine Spectator Magazine
- Sacramento magazine readers voted The Firehouse for various dining awards, including “Best Wine List, Best Special Occasion, Best Outdoor Dining and Best Old Favorite.”
- Received Sacramento magazine's Editor's Choice Award “The Firehouse Courtyard—Best Atmosphere for Dining.”
- Citysearch awarded The Firehouse the “Best Special Occasion” award.
- Awarded the “Award of Unique Distinction” from Wine Enthusiast Magazine in 2006 and 2007.
- California Restaurant Association's Best California Wine List Competition Winner
