= Old Sacramento State Historic Park =

- Old Sacramento Historic District
- U.S. National Register of Historic Places
- U.S. National Historic Landmark District
- California Historical Landmark No. 812
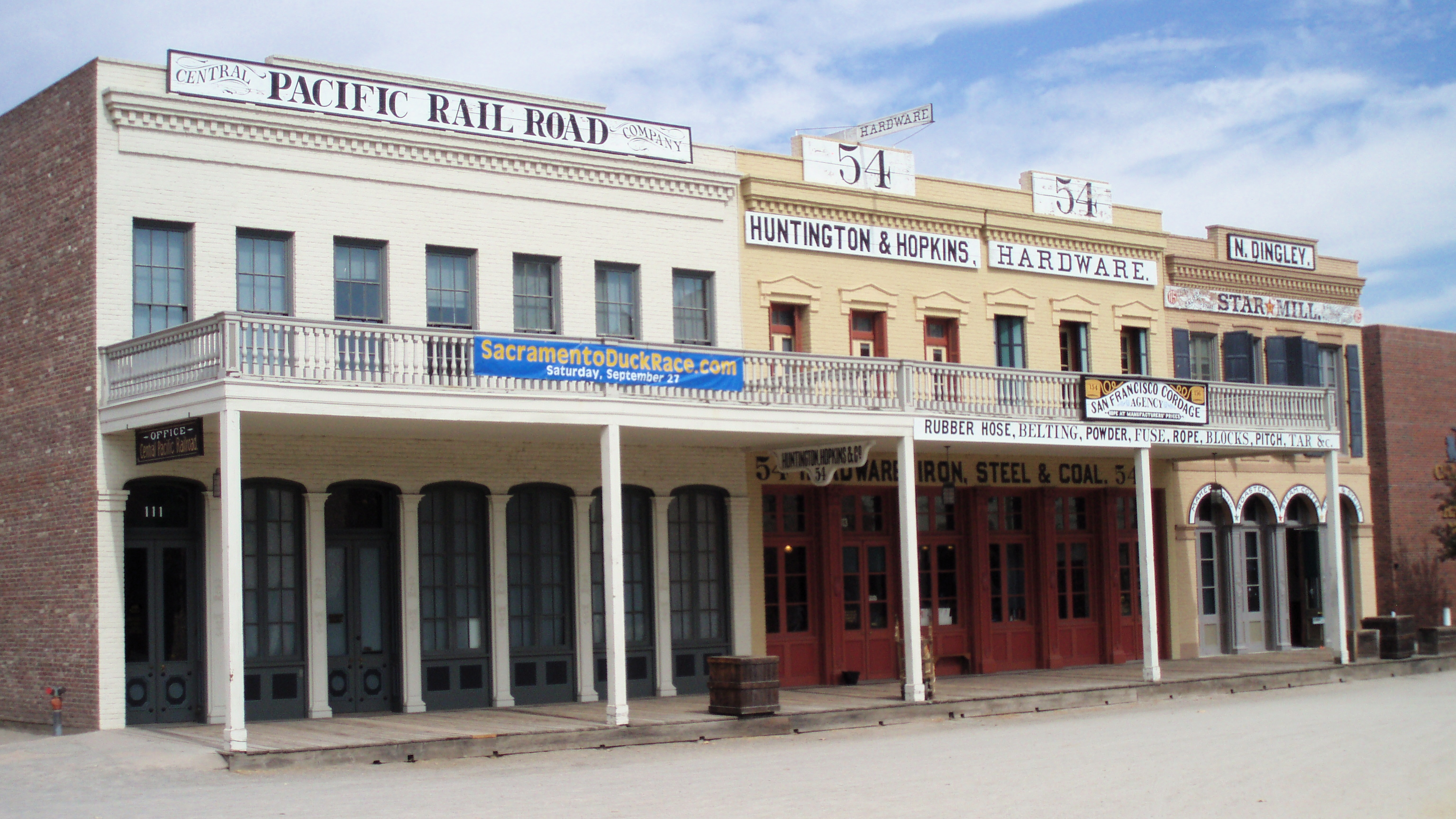
- The Big Four Building, Old Sacramento

- Location within Sacramento, California Location within California Location within the United States
- Location: Sacramento, California
- Coordinates: 38°34′58″N 121°30′12″W
- Built: 1849
- NRHP reference No.: 66000219
- CHISL No.: 812

Significant dates
- Added to NRHP: October 15, 1966
- Designated NHLD: January 12, 1965

Old Sacramento State Historic Park occupies around one third of the property within the Old Sacramento Historic District of Sacramento, California. The Old Sacramento Historic District is a U.S. National Historic Landmark District. The Historic District is sometimes abbreviated as Old Sacramento, Old Sac, or Old Town Sac, and since the 1960s has been restored and developed as a significant tourist attraction.

== History ==
The city of Sacramento grew up in the mid-nineteenth century as a development from Sutter's Fort. However, the Fort was some distance from the Sacramento River, which was the main means of transport to the coast of California, and the area that would become the modern city developed along the waterfront.

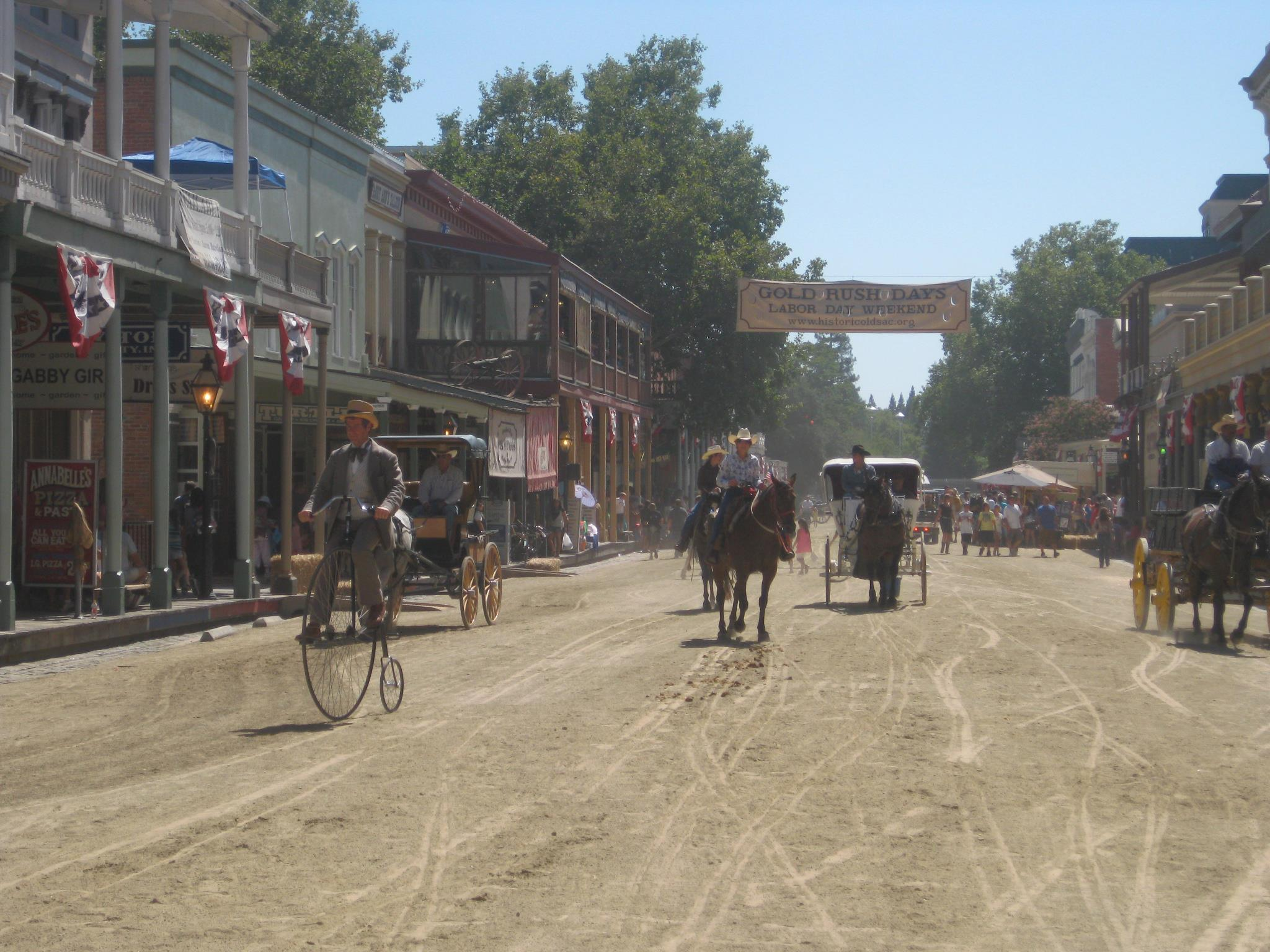
Old Sacramento during Gold Rush Days 2011

Before Sacramento's extensive levee system was put in place, the area flooded quite regularly. Because of this, the city's streets were raised a level. Most of the sidewalks and storefronts have been filled in; however, many tunnels still remain throughout Old Sacramento and the downtown area.

By the 1960s, the area had fallen into disrepair and disrepute. A large effort was made to secure the area's future as an outdoor living history center similar to Colonial Williamsburg in Virginia. Several historically significant buildings were moved or reconstructed. Those that were beyond repair were demolished.

Today, the Old Sacramento Historic District covers the area between the river frontage and Interstate 5, between I Street and the Capitol Mall. The State Historic Park comprises about a third of the total acreage of the district including half of the waterfront, a large grassy area and railroad features. Virtually all the buildings in this area date from the 19th century, the most notable dating back to the period immediately after the disastrous fire of 1852, and show a reasonable approximation of their original appearance, though they have required varying degrees of reconstruction to restore to them to that state. However, few, if any, still serve their original purpose; most of them now house restaurants, gift shops, or other businesses catering to tourists.

Old Sacramento State Historic Park attracts over 5 million visitors annually. Regular events include the Sacramento Music Festival (formerly known as the Sacramento Jazz Jubilee), Gold Rush Days, New Year's Eve events, the St. Patrick's Day Parade, the World Music and Dance Festival and Mardi Gras.

== Architecture ==
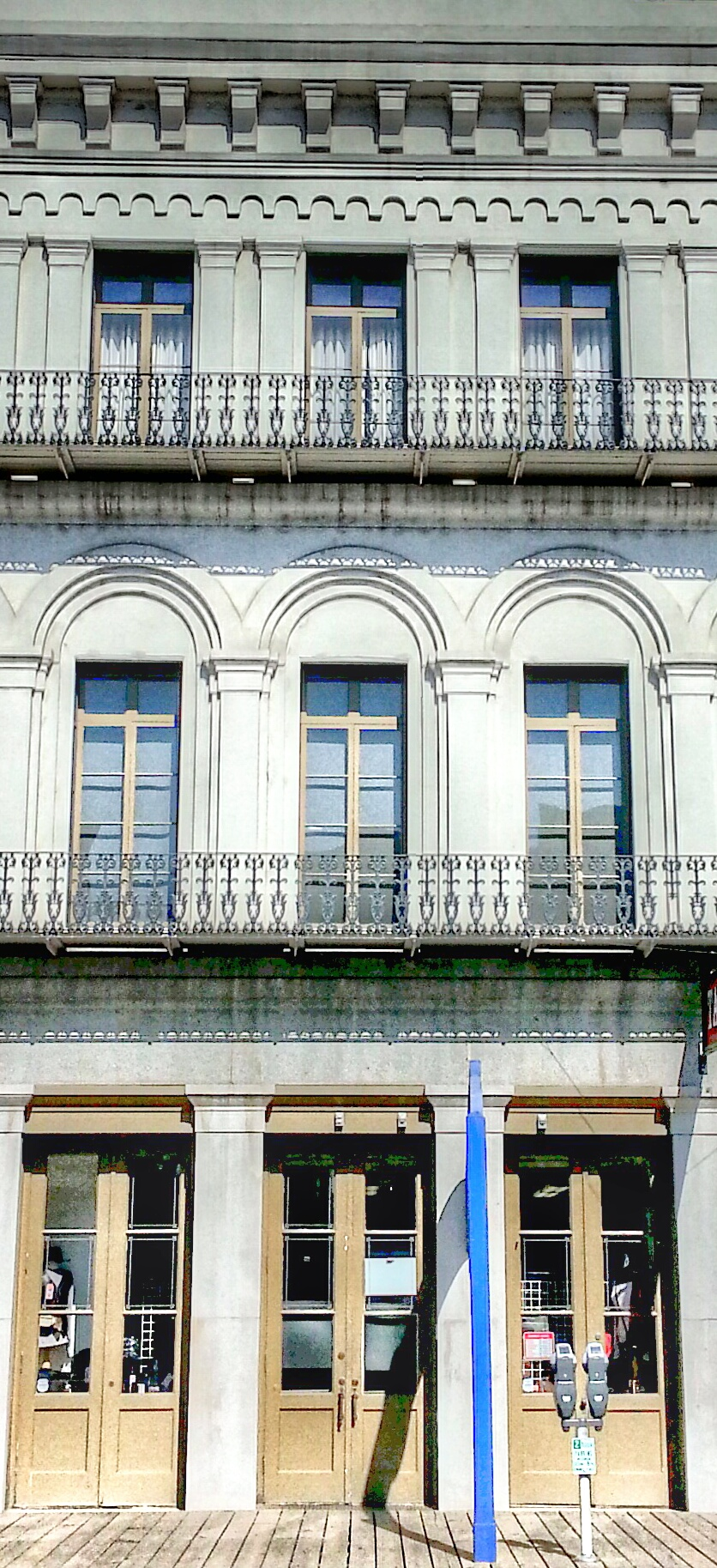
Birch Building on 2nd Street

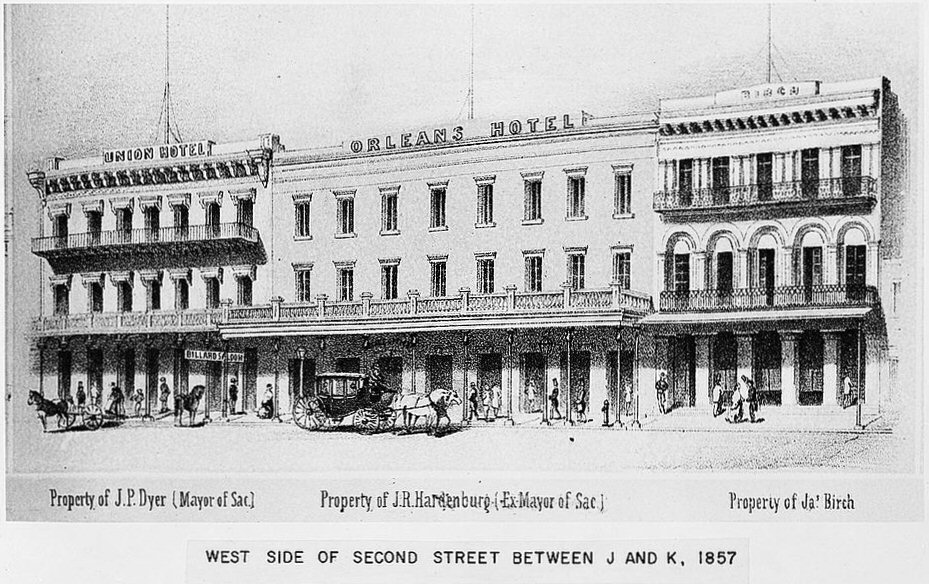
The Union Hotel, Birch Building, and Orleans Hotel (recently reconstructed)

While the architecture from this period is commonly attributed to Victorian gold miners, characteristics of West End, such as multi-storied buildings, large arched doorways, full-height balcony windows and the use of decorative wrought-iron balconies, were most ubiquitous in parts of Spain and the Spanish colonies. This influence may be attributed to the fact that the period of Spanish, then Mexican, rule in California enjoyed immigration from all over the Atlantic, including Spain and the Canary Islands, and the Spanish colonies.

The architecture of Old Town Sacramento (formerly known as West End) exhibits observable characteristics similar to that of San Juan (Puerto Rico), Havana (Cuba), Tampico (Mexico), Seville (Spain), Santa Cruz de Tenerife (Canary Islands) and Madrid (Spain).

While the architectural style of Old Sacramento, with its wrought iron balconies and evenly spaced full-height windows may remind one of Paris, Sacramento's oldest buildings predate the Haussmann Projects that renovated large areas of Paris in that style.

== Historic buildings ==
Notable buildings include:

- B. F. Hastings Building, the National Historic Landmark western terminal of the Pony Express and the first location of the California Supreme Court; also housed the office of the Alta California Telegraph Company; features a branch of the Wells Fargo History Museum
- Big Four House, a National Historic Landmark building constructed through the joint efforts of California's railroad pioneers: Collis Huntington, Mark Hopkins, Leland Stanford and Charles Crocker, known as The Big Four.
- Lady Adams Building - oldest non-residential building in Old Sacramento and is California Historical Landmark No. 603.
- Pioneer Telegraph Station
- Adams and Company Building - California Historical Landmark No. 607.
- Sacramento Engine Company No. 3, the oldest remaining firehouse in Sacramento
- The Firehouse Restaurant (1853), redbrick firehouse; (1960) restaurant
- Old Sacramento Schoolhouse Museum
- Eagle Theatre - only survived from 1849 to 1850 but has been reconstructed
- Sam Brannan House built in 1853, was also Jones Hotel and Vernon House.
- Booth Company Building also California Governor Booth's mansion.
- What Cheer House
- Morse Building - Dr. John Frederick Morse, Sacramento's pioneer doctor.

== Memorials ==
Theodore Judah plaque in Old Sacramento

The district contains many memorials to the founders of the city and of the California and transcontinental railroad and other transport systems, including the Theodore Judah monument and the Pony Express Statue.

== Current attractions ==
Old Sacramento is the site of the California State Railroad Museum, the California State Military Museum, the Sacramento History Museum, the Wells Fargo History Museum and the Old Sacramento Interpretive Center.

Other attractions available for visitors include rides in horse-drawn carriages, historic trains from the former Central Pacific Railroad passenger station, and cruises on historic riverboats. A historic sternwheel riverboat, the Delta King, is moored in the river and serves as a hotel, restaurant and theater. Atrium 916, in the North Public Market, on Front Street with Artist Studios, Art Cafe and Sustainable Sacramento Made goods. The Embarcadero, located north of J Street, allows access to the water's edge.

The Sacramento Valley Rail Station is just a short walk away from Old Sacramento.

== Interpretive programs ==
The Old Sacramento Historical Foundation manages several programs to highlight the history of the city, including historical reenactments by costumed docents, as well as tours of Old Sacramento's underground level. During October, there is also a special Halloween themed ghost tour.

Every Labor Day weekend, Old Sacramento holds its annual Gold Rush Days. During this time, the paved streets are covered with several tons of dirt and automobile traffic is barred from the area. Old Sac's regular corps of costumed docents is supplemented by extra volunteers and professional reenactors to recreate life in Sacramento as it was in the mid to late 1800s.

== See also ==
- California Historical Landmarks in Sacramento County
