= History of Sacramento, California =

The history of Sacramento, California, began with its founding by Samuel Brannan and John Augustus Sutter, Jr. in 1848 around an embarcadero that his father, John Sutter, Sr. constructed at the confluence of the American and Sacramento Rivers a few years prior.

Sacramento was named after the Sacramento River, which forms its western border. The river was named by Spanish cavalry officer Gabriel Moraga for the Santisimo Sacramento (Most Holy Sacrament), referring to the Catholic Eucharist.

Before the arrival of Europeans, the Nisenan Native American tribe inhabited the Sacramento Valley area. The Spanish were the first Europeans to explore the area, and Sacramento fell into the Alta California province of New Spain when the conquistadors claimed Central America and the American Southwest for the Spanish Empire. The area was deemed unfit for colonization by a number of explorers and as a result remained relatively untouched by the Europeans who claimed the region, excepting early 19th Century coastal settlements north of San Francisco Bay which constituted the southernmost Russian colony in North America and were spread over an area stretching from Point Arena to Tomales Bay. When John Sutter arrived in the provincial colonial capital of Monterey in 1839, governor Juan Bautista Alvarado provided Sutter with the land he asked for, and Sutter established New Helvetia, which he controlled absolutely with a private army and relative autonomy from the newly independent Mexican government.

The California Gold Rush started when gold was discovered at Sutter's Mill, one of Sutter, Sr.'s assets in the city of Coloma in 1848; the arrival of prospectors in droves ruined Sutter's New Helvetia and trade began to develop around a wharf he had established where the American and Sacramento Rivers joined. In the region where Sutter had planned to establish the city of Sutterville, Sacramento City was founded; Sutter, Sr. put his son in charge in frustration, and Sutter, Jr. worked to organize the city in its growth. However, its location caused the city to periodically fill with water. Fires would also sweep through the city. To resolve the problems, the city worked to raise the sidewalks and buildings and began to replace wooden structures with more resilient materials, like brick and stone. The city was selected as the state capital in 1854 after Mariano Guadalupe Vallejo failed to convince the state government to remain in the city of his namesake.

== Prior to Sutter's arrival – through 1838 ==
Indigenous people such as the Miwok and Maidu Indians were the original inhabitants of the north Californian Central Valley. Of the Maidu, the Nisenan Maidu group were the principal inhabitants of pre-Columbian Sacramento; the peoples of this tribe were hunter-gatherers, relying on foraged nuts and berries and fish from local rivers instead of food generated by agricultural means.

The first European in the state of California was conquistador Juan Rodriguez Cabrillo, a Portuguese explorer sailing on behalf of the Spanish Empire, in 1542; later explorers included Sir Francis Drake and Sebastián Vizcaíno. However, no explorer had yet discovered the Sacramento Valley region nor the Golden Gate strait, which would remain undiscovered until, respectively, 1808 and 1623. A number of conquistadors had completed cursory examinations of the region by the mid-18th century, including Juan Bautista de Anza and Pedro Fages, but none viewed the region as a potentially valuable region to colonize. Neither did Gabriel Moraga, who was the first European to enter the Sierra in 1808 and was responsible for naming the Sacramento River, although he incorrectly placed the rivers in the region. However, Padres Abella and Fortuni arrived in the region in 1811 and returned positive feedback to the Roman Catholic Church, although the church disregarded their finds as they were in conflict with all previous views of the area. The Mexicans, who had declared independence in 1821, shared Spanish sentiments, and the area remained uncolonized until the arrival of John Sutter in 1839.

The area that would become the city of Sacramento was initially observed by many European and American mapmakers as home to Great Plains-based rivers that stretched across the Rocky Mountains and emptied into the Pacific Ocean. Speculation at the time placed the fabled St. Bonaventura River where the American-Sacramento River complex was; mountain man Jedediah Smith mistook the American and Sacramento Rivers for the St. Bonaventura in his 1827 venture into the region, and named the Sacramento Valley the "Valley of the Bonadventure" before trekking southwards along the Stanislaus River.

== Mexican Territory: Sutter's Colony – 1839 to 1848 ==
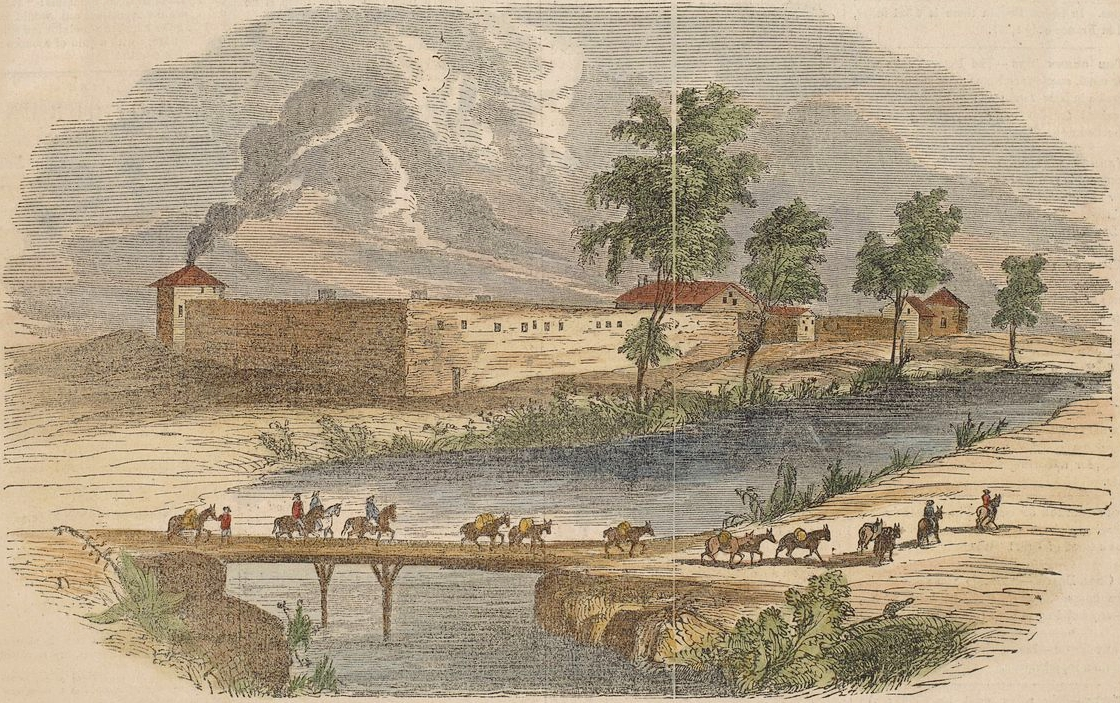
A depiction of Sutter's Fort, as it had appeared in the 1840s.

John Augustus Sutter arrived in the city of Yerba Buena, which would become the city of San Francisco, after encountering a massive storm en route from the city of Sitka, Russian Alaska; he was later redirected by Mexican officials to the colonial capital of Monterey, where he appealed to governor Juan Bautista Alvarado of Alta California his ambitions to establish an "empire of civilization" on "new land". Alvarado noted that he needed to establish a presence in the Sacramento Valley, and realized that Sutter's ambitions allowed him an opportunity to secure the valley without committing extra troops to the region. As a result, he granted Sutter's request on the condition that Sutter would become a Mexican citizen. Sutter commenced to build a fort of his namesake, Sutter's Fort, in 1840; the fort became his base of operations. New Helvetia was roughly 44,000 acres (180 km^{2}) in size until he negotiated an 1841 deal with the Russians to purchase Ft. Ross, which lay in present-day Sonoma County, and consolidated all of Ft. Ross' holdings with those at Fort Sutter.

Sutter's New Helvetia existed within Mexican borders, sporting a large degree of autonomy; John Sutter ruled over New Helvetia with absolute power, and named himself general over a privately developed army composed of Native Americans. John Sutter employed both white people and Native Americans for many mundane and military tasks regarding New Helvetia. After New Helvetia grew to encompass Fort Ross, Sutter's military presence in the region began to garner suspicion from the government of Mexican Alta California; Sutter, who often bragged of his military strength, aggravated the Mexican government with his claims of power. As New Helvetia continued to develop economically, Sutter constructed a ranch at the Nisenan village of Hok and named it "Hock Farm", designating it his official retreat. New Helvetia was considered a stable colony by 1844, and was the only foreigner-friendly locale in Alta California at the time. Among other foreigners, the Donner Party had designated Sutter's Fort their destination during an overland journey that placed them across the Sierra mountains in the wintertime.

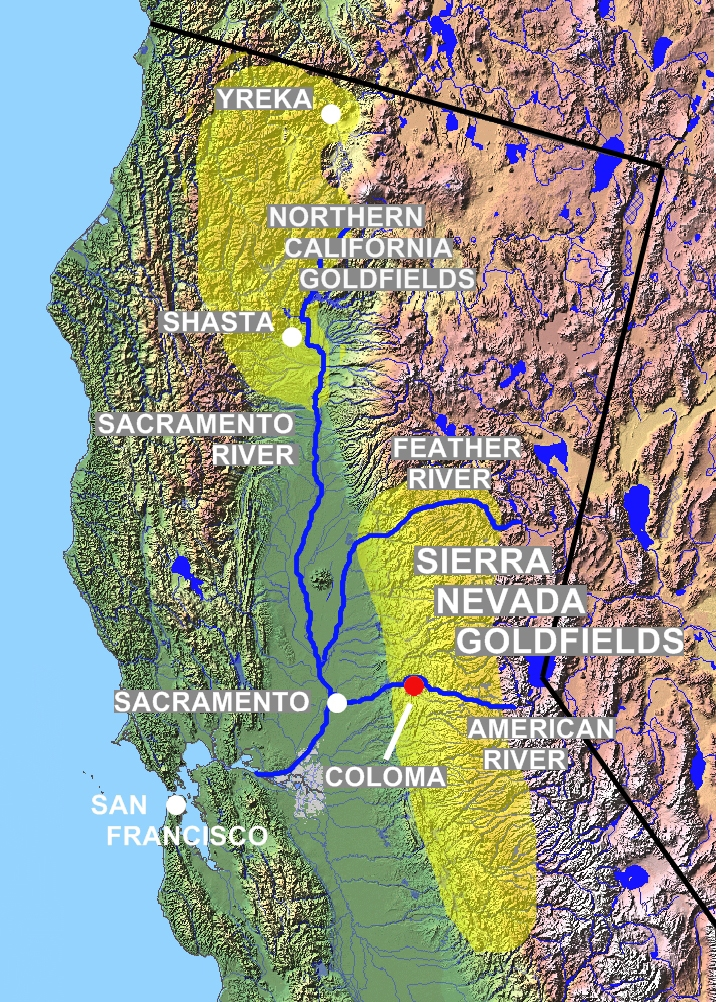
A map of northern California gold fields, in relation to Sacramento and Coloma

Sutter's empire began to disintegrate when he decided to back the unpopular Alta Californian governor Manuel Micheltorena, who was soon overthrown by Alvarado and José Castro in an 1841 coup d'état. Sutter was jailed as a result, but not before Micheltorena issued the Sobrante Grant, which added 88,000 acres (360 km^{2}) of land to New Helvetian territory. In 1845, Castro arrived at Sutter's Fort and offered a deal to purchase New Helvetia; Sutter declined, although he later expressed regret for not accepting Castro's terms. In 1846, the Bear Flag Revolt was initiated by Americans in Sonoma who were frightened by growing Mexican hostility towards foreign presences in the region; taking the city by surprise, general Mariano Vallejo was captured at his headquarters in the city, and the irregular force demanded use of Sutter's prison facilities to host captured Mexican officials. Agreeing reluctantly, Sutter raised the Bear Flag over his fortification. However, he treated the Vallejos, whom he considered friends, as guests and not as prisoners. While the "Bear Flaggers" under William B. Ide and John C. Frémont continued to wage war against the Mexican government, Sutter attempted to resume a state of normalcy in New Helvetia, although the lack of manpower as a result of the revolt left productivity lagging.

The United States initiated the Mexican–American War in 1846 against Mexico in the wake of the U.S. annexation of the Republic of Texas, whose independence Mexico had not recognized. California, along with Nevada, Utah, New Mexico, most of Arizona and Colorado, and parts of Oklahoma, Kansas, and Wyoming, were annexed by the United States in the 1848 Treaty of Guadalupe Hidalgo. Thus, Sutter's New Helvetia fell under U.S. control.

Continuing business as normal, John Sutter dispatched associate James W. Marshall, who was to construct a sawmill in the foothills of the Sierra at the city of Coloma, in 1847. In January 1848, Marshall detected a flake of gold on the ground at the site of Sutter's new mill, and after conducting tests, determined the mineral's authenticity. Word leaked about the discovery nearly immediately. When news reached San Francisco, a rush of hopeful prospectors began to move northwards to the Sacramento Valley, and by the middle of the year, so-called "Argonauts" flooded Sutter's holdings in search of gold. The arrival of Argonauts in the region decimated the economical integrity of Sutter's New Helvetia, as the prospectors slaughtered his herds of livestock, drove out local Native Americans loyal to Sutter, and divided New Helvetia amongst each other without Sutter's consent. Disappointed with what had become of his holdings, Sutter placed his son as head of fort business operations and retired to Hock Farm.

== Foundation – 1848 to 1850 ==
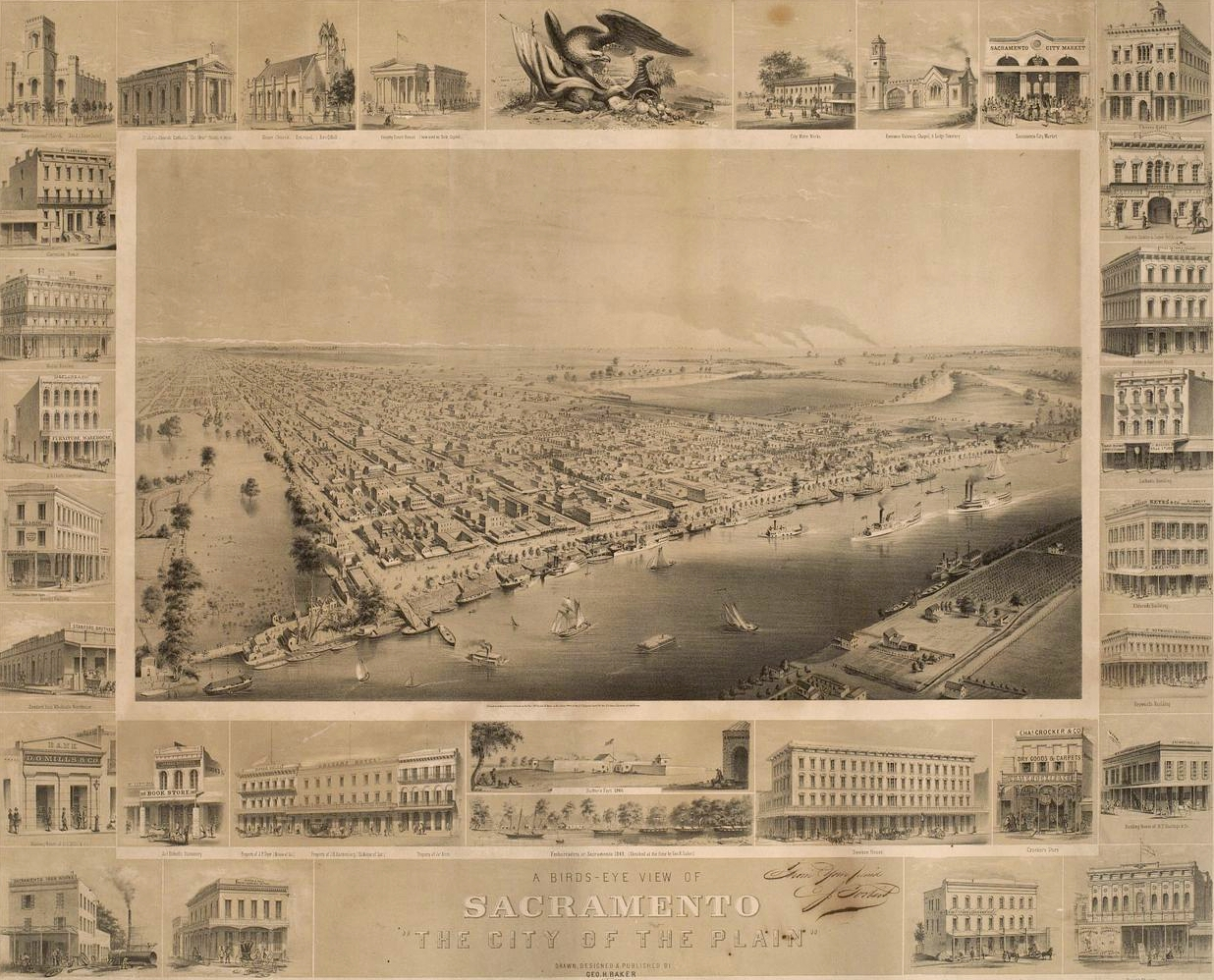
Birds-eye view of Sacramento, ca. 1857

The real city of Sacramento was developed around a wharf, called the Embarcadero, on the confluence of the American River and Sacramento River that Sutter had developed prior to his retirement in 1849 as a result of the gold discoveries which began at Sutter's Mill at Coloma. John Sutter, Sr. had replaced himself with his son, John Sutter, Jr., who noticed growth of trade at the Embarcadero and considered it a viable economic opportunity; the port was used increasingly as a point of debarkation for prospecting Argonauts heading eastwards. Sutter, Jr. had military officials William H. Warner and his assistant, William Tecumseh Sherman, survey his father's holdings for a location where he could establish a new city and create the city over a grid of numbered and lettered streets for organizational purposes. A number of businessmen, including millionaire-to-be Samuel Brannan, future California governor Peter Burnett, and George McDougall, brother of future California governor John McDougall, were attracted to the waterfront location. However, Sutter, Jr. and George McDougall disagreed over the terms of the lease of the location, and a trade war erupted between Sutter's Sacramento City and McDougall's new base of operations at Sutterville. Sutter, Sr., who had opposed many of his son's decisions, resumed control of his business affairs after Sutter, Jr. ended the competition between the two cities; trade in the area was biased toward Sacramento City as a result of Sutter, Jr.'s efforts.

Unlike other settlements of its time and type, Sacramento City did not have gambling houses and saloons until the summer of 1849; the city was free of those businesses for the first few months of its existence. Churches also appeared early on when the Methodist Episcopalian pastor W. Grove Deal established the first church with regular services in May 1849. Catholic reverend Augustine Anderson arrived in 1850 and constructed a church in 1854, while Jews founded a synagogue called Congregation B'Nai Israel in 1852. In 1849, Edward C. Kemble moved north from San Francisco and established the city's first newspaper, The Placer Times. Kemble's newspaper disassembled three months later when Kemble was stricken with sickness. The first Sacramento theatrical stage, located in the Eagle Theatre (Sacramento, California), was founded in October 1849.

Sacramento City did not have a formal government during early and mid-1849, and gambling institutions in the region sought to keep only the loose alcalde government. However, many city residents were swayed in favor of the gambling houses; by the fall of that year, the entire legal structure of Sacramento City was established by a large 296-vote margin on a second proposal. The government of California had only just reorganized itself into county units; days after the overhaul, the California State Legislature verified that Sacramento was officially recognized by means of charter in February 1850. Sacramento City later petitioned the Legislature to drop the "City" from the settlement's name, which was also granted. Sacramento City was serviced by organized public transportation via the rivers and upheld regular street maintenance by 1850; the settlement had reached a "home-and-garden" stage in development by the same time.

== Early development – 1850 to 1860 ==
In January 1850, a major flood devastated the city. Rain from heavy storms had saturated the grounds upon which Sacramento was built, and the American and Sacramento rivers crested simultaneously.

The economic impact was significant because merchandise stationed at the Embarcadero was not secured and washed away in the flood. Sacramento rallied behind Hardin Bigelow, who led efforts to implement emergency measures to protect the city from another disaster of that nature. Responsibility for construction of protective levees and dams won him support, and he was elected first mayor of the city.

A second major flood in March 1850 was averted by Bigelow's efforts. In April of the same year, the city experienced its first major fire. A second fire in November destroyed a number of commercial establishments in the city. In response to growing fear of a potential catastrophe, citizen volunteers founded California's first fire protection organization, named the "Mutual Hook and Ladder Company." The city adapted by implementing iron window shutters to reduce wind draft and make fires harder to spread.

October 1850 brought the arrival of the New World, a riverboat that carried news of California's admittance to the Union. It also brought the cholera epidemic that killed between 800 and 1,000 people within three weeks including between a quarter to half of the city's physicians. Nearly eighty percent of the population fled. Bodies were buried in mass graves at cemeteries across the city.

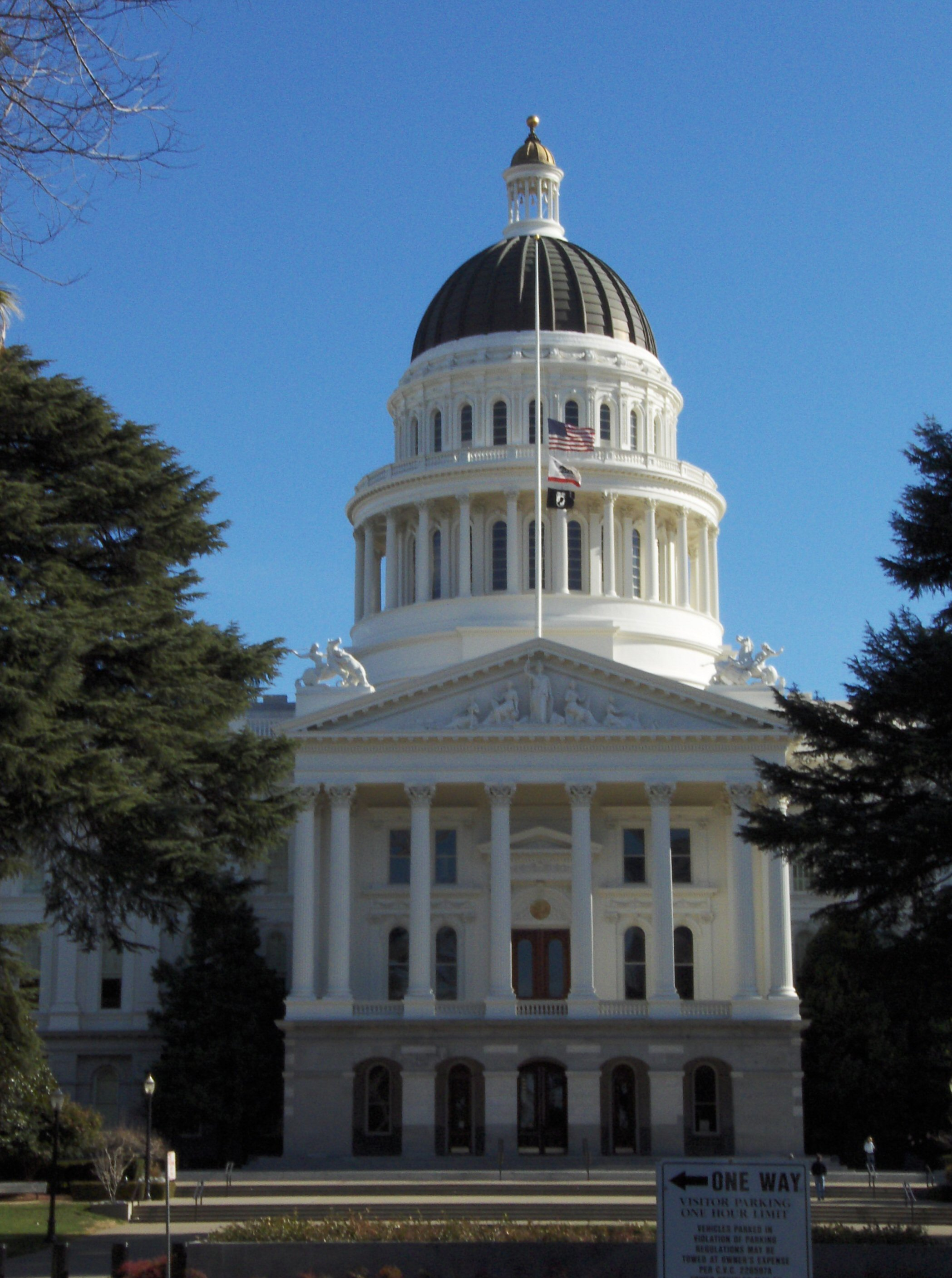
California State Capitol; one of few state capitols to fly POW flag

Those who sought land from 1848 onwards refused to honor the New Helvetian settlement and that Sutter alone held title to so much land; additionally, they refused to recognize the titles of speculators who sold the land at exorbitant prices. The squatters who wished to take from Sutter's land worked to find loopholes in the law that would allow them to claim the land as public and render his, and those of the speculators that bought land from him, invalid. The push for recognition of squatter's rights in the Sacramento area led to the formation of a Law and Order Association amongst the squatters. When a squatter was judged for execution and was denied passage to a squatters' appeals court, the squatters swore that they were prepared for warfare in the case that their claims were denied judgment by higher courts. Rallying under future Kansas governor Charles L. Robinson, the squatters formed militias and prepared to attack the city; however, Hardin Bigelow averted the crisis temporarily by assuring the squatters that arrests will not be made as a result of siding with Robinson. However, violence finally broke out when Bigelow moved to stop Robinson from freeing prisoners held captive aboard the prison brig, the La Grange, on August 14, 1850. Bigelow repelled the force at the cost of his health. The Sheriff, McKinney, moved to attack a retreat near the settlement of Brighton just outside city limits; McKinney and three squatters died, but the event, which came to be known as the Squatters Riot, drew to a close. Additionally, the year afterwards, a group of 213 Sacramentans founded the extra-legal Vigilance Committee after the group of the same name and purpose in the San Francisco Bay Area; lynching a prisoner who was pardoned by the mayor of the city, the committee dissolved soon afterwards, losing support after demanding that the mayor step down for interfering needlessly and when the mayor refused to do so.

By 1852, Sutter's New Helvetia had collapsed completely, and Sutter's Fort had been abandoned. Sacramento's commerce had become reliant on coins, and the city had outgrown its unstable Gold Rush boomtown status and established itself as a fully fledged community; The Embarcadero, which had driven the growth of Sacramento from the start, no longer solely determined if the city would survive or be abandoned. The year 1852 saw a diversification in the Sacramentan economy; pharmacies, attorney firms, brass foundries, and lingerie shops, among others, lined the streets of the city during this era. Additionally, companies were beginning to take advantage of the fish populations in the American and Sacramento Rivers, a resource that Sutter had discovered and utilized during the era of New Helvetia. The Central Valley's capacity for agriculture was also noted, and wheat surpluses that had originated in the Sacramento area were often shipped en route to foreign countries. However, the city caught afire the night of November 2, 1852; nearly 85% of the city was destroyed in the fire. Sacramentans rebuilt the city with brick, rather than the fire-hazardous wood that was the medium for buildings in that era. A second fire in 1854 destroyed twelve newly reconstructed downtown city blocks, including the city courthouse.

The American state of California's government met in Monterey in late 1849, the capital of the former Alta California, to conduct the first State Constitutional Convention; the seat of government was set in San Jose, although the government disliked the locale. Former Mexican general Mariano Guadalupe Vallejo promised a viable capital city at Vallejo in 1852. Vallejo was unable to sufficiently construct the city of Vallejo, and the government was moved to the city of Sacramento temporarily; after Vallejo failed again, he released himself from his contract to the state, and the government moved to Benicia until Sacramento made a bid for the capital that the Legislature accepted completely in 1854. The same year, the state legislature voted to make Sacramento the permanent state capital. Construction on the California State Capitol commenced in 1860; the structure would take fourteen years to complete.

In early 1855, Colonel Charles L. Wilson and Theodore Judah started work on the Sacramento Valley Railroad; the railroad was the first to be chartered west of the Mississippi River and was done so by Colonel Wilson three years prior. A money panic caused by an unfavorable winter forced Wilson to retire from the project, and he was replaced by Joseph Libbey Folsom; Folsom died in July and was replaced by C. K. Garrison. As ongoing difficulties for the project continued to hinder operations, the length of the railroad was limited to the city of Granite City (later renamed for Folsom), twenty-two miles away. After Judah completed the track for the Sacramento Valley Railroad in 1856, he petitioned the U.S. government for a transcontinental railroad. However, tensions over slavery between pro-slavery and anti-slavery forces in the east took precedence over Judah's proposition.

== The Civil War era to the twentieth century – 1861 to 1900 ==
Theodore Judah plaque in Old Sacramento

The California Republican Party was founded in Sacramento on April 18, 1856, when the first mass meeting aggregated in the city. When the American Civil War started, the city was strongly pro-Union, although the opposing side, the Confederate States of America, had active supporters within the city. The city of Sacramento's population was alarmed at the possibility of an invasion by forces that were stationed in Confederate Texas when the Union presence stationed within the city was drawn eastwards for battle. As a result, volunteers organized into military defense forces in case an invasion ever would take place.

As a means of communication meant to replace the inefficient letter delivery via ocean around South America's Cape Horn, the Pony Express was brought to Sacramento in 1860. This was the first cross-continent means of communication and tied California to the states in the east across the Great Plains. However, the Pony Express only lasted eighteen months and was rendered obsolete upon the arrival of the First Transcontinental Telegraph. By 1861, Sacramento was linked to the telegraph lines on the other side of the continent.

December 1861 and January 1862 brought about devastating floods that placed the future of the city in doubt. In order to resolve the situation, the city residents agreed that additional levee construction was necessary. However, the city was divided between camps that supported a relatively small grading of a few feet to raise the city just above the rivers' cresting levels and those that supported a substantial grading to accommodate basements in city businesses. In the upcoming election of 1863, the level at which the city should be raised became a primary factor; a candidate that supported high-level grading won, and high-level grading renovation proceeded. Earth was removed from a dangerous bend nearby the confluence of the two rivers and used to raise city blocks in 1868; the city's sidewalks, until construction was finally finished, were uneven because neighbors of raised city blocks often remained at the pre-construction level. After the filled regions beneath buildings had settled, new streets had to be paved. While planking had been used in the past, newly raised streets chose either the smooth (though undurable) Nicolson pavement or the easily dirtied (though durable) cobblestone pavement. Grading and paving processes were fully completed by 1873, leaving the first floors of many buildings at the time as basements and leaving second floors as new main floors. Today, this system of 19th-century basements is known as the Sacramento Underground.

While the grading of the city commenced, Theodore Judah, who continued to request government grants in an attempt to build a transcontinental railroad, did not receive the reception he wished; instead, he worked with Daniel Strong and generated the Central Pacific Railroad plan. However, the Sacramento Valley Railroad ejected him from its administration, suspicious of his actions. For matters of funding, Judah met with thirty Sacramento businessmen and discussed the possibility of this railroad. Among those businessmen were the Big Four: Mark Hopkins, Jr., Charles Crocker, Collis P. Huntington, and Leland Stanford. Together, the four formed the Central Pacific Railroad of California in 1861. The American Civil War began, and president Abraham Lincoln approved the railroad without the Southern forces that would've normally opposed the operation; ground was broken in downtown Sacramento on January 8, 1863. By 1865, the burgeoning company absorbed the Sacramento Valley Railroad, and the original Western Pacific Railroad was purchased in 1867, which was incorporated to connect Sacramento to Stockton. The California Pacific Railroad Company in 1868 initiated a "war" with the Central Pacific Railroad over control of Sacramento, involving legal and extralegal action. As a result of the endeavors taken between the two railroad companies, the Yolo-Sacramento Bridge was created, the first bridge across the Sacramento river. The "war" ended when the California Pacific Railroad was absorbed into the Central Pacific Railroad Company. The dominance of railroad companies prevailed in Sacramento during this part of its history; mayor William Land, who served in 1898–99, was considered a pawn of the railroad companies, and Southern Pacific Railroad Company executive William Herrin often dodged attempts at reform and bent public policy to better serve his railroad.

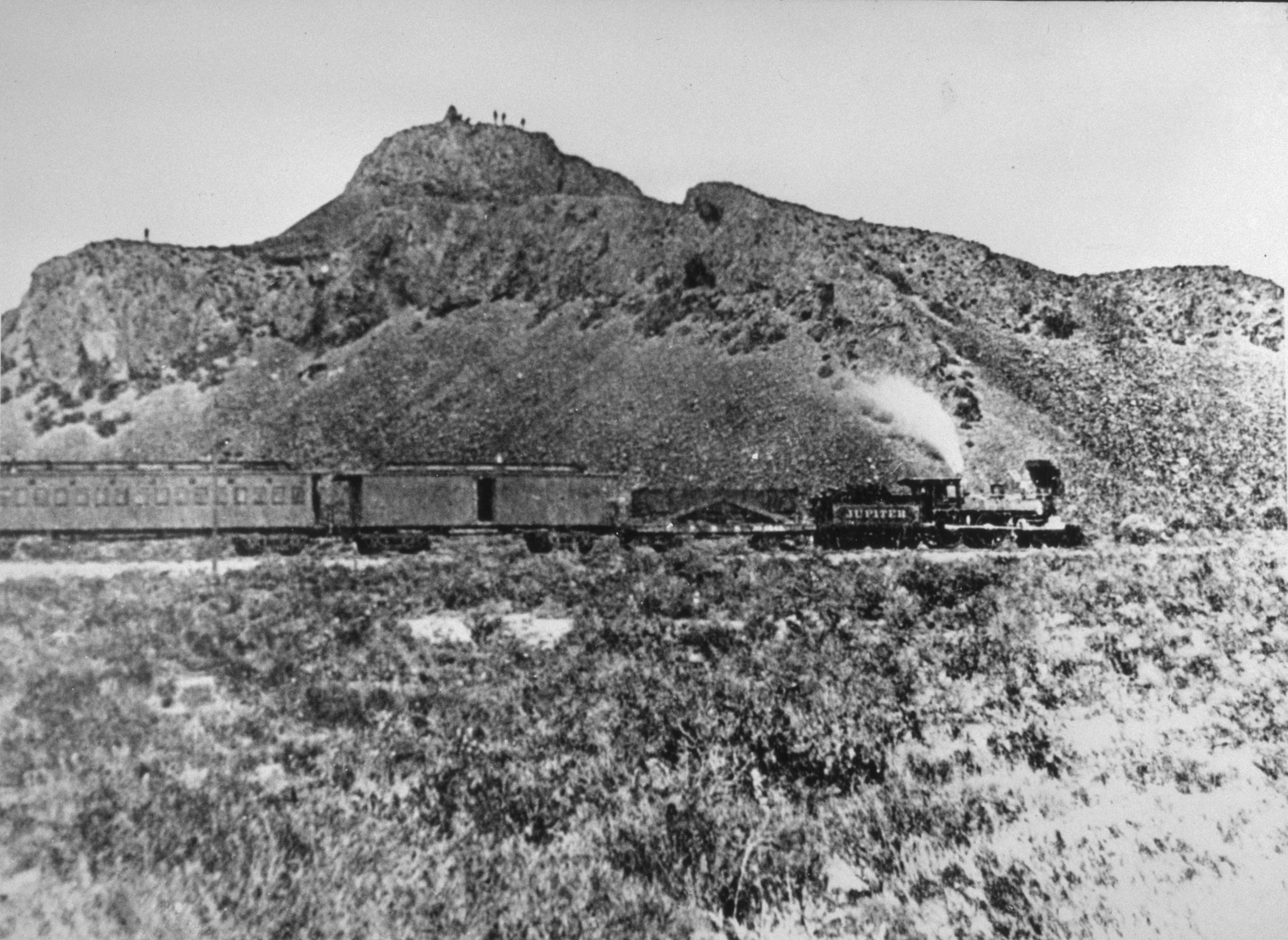
The First transcontinental railroad, whose western component was anchored in Sacramento

With the advent of the railroad and the introduction of refrigeration, wheat prices dropped, and fruit became a significant cash crop. As a result, in 1883 onwards until the start of the 20th century, grain ranches that had previously profited from wheat began to bankrupt and close; the original owners of the ranches soon died off, and the heirs deeded land to those who were seeking it; this era brought about a land boom, and the new fruit ranchers in the region made arable hundreds of thousands of acres through irrigation. However, the passage of the Chinese Exclusion Act in 1882 noticeably dampered the economic growth of Sacramento's agriculture. Despite the anti-Asian sentiment, all types of foreigners were drawn to the city starting in the 1890s, ranging from Europeans that had immigrated from Italy, Portugal, and Croatia to Japanese, Korean, Punjabi, and Filipino arrivals. Many of these immigrants aligned themselves with the local Democratic Party.

Although schoolhouses had existed in Sacramento County since 1853, Sacramento High School, the city's first secondary education institution, was founded in 1856 and instructed students in courses ranging from core English and mathematics to astronomy and bookkeeping. The high school was moved to a permanent location in 1887 as Sacramento's population started to skyrocket, and the high school administration opened twelve elementary feeder schools across the city of Sacramento. Starting in 1894, in tandem with the early civil rights movement, individual schools in the city began to integrate.

== World War I and the Prohibition – 1901 to 1930 ==
The automobile was introduced to the city in 1900 through a local street fair; in 1903, the first car dealership opened, and the year after, twenty-seven Sacramentans owned cars. The number of automobile owners increased exponentially from that point. The advent of the automobile obsoleted careers involving horseback and overland wagon travel and decreased the importance of the steamboat and railroad industries.

A series of Progressive Sacramentan politicians rose to key positions in the city government, implementing various methods of reform. Mayor George H. Clark, Land's successor, worked to end illicit gambling activity in the city's poolhalls; he also passed a referendum that reformed the Sacramentan charter government, equalizing the political power of each of the city's wards so as to avoid dominance in wards that hosted a rapidly growing working class population. 1907 saw a breakage in the monopoly that the Southern Pacific Railroad held over Sacramento when the second Western Pacific Railroad requested permission to construct yards in the city's vicinity, while women's rights activist L.G. Waterhouse, who headed the Sacramento Women's Suffrage Association, worked toward women's suffrage. Sacramentan women were granted the right to vote in 1911, nearly nine years prior to the passage of the nineteenth amendment that enforced this suffrage nationwide.

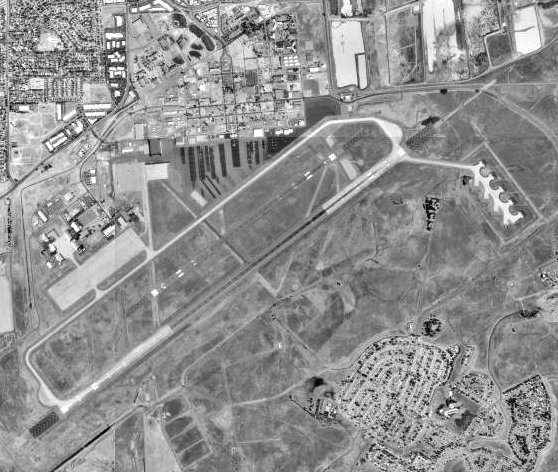
Mather Air Force Base, located in eastern Sacramento, was a significant economic driving force for the city.

At the same time, the Rancho Del Paso and Rancho San Juan Mexican land grants that encompassed much of the northern parts of the county were sold to the public; people who invested in county development would construct the settlement of Citrus Heights on the land designated as the grant; plans for communities like Orangevale, Carmichael, and Fair Oaks were set into motion to complement the city's reputation as a fruit production powerhouse. The city began to expand exponentially after the Sacramento government convinced the residents of East Sacramento and Oak Park to approve annexation. The three cities were officially joined in September 1911. The first automobile-friendly settlement to be founded was North Sacramento, which was bisected by Del Paso Boulevard.

Nearly 4,000 troops destined for battle in Europe's First World War had come from Sacramento and other cities within the county; of those 4,000, about 100 died. The coming of the war also sparked hysteria amongst the population, biasing them against Germans and concepts associated with Germany. Sacramento's Lutheran churches began to preach in languages other than German. Additionally, a Council of Defense searched for and punished signs of disloyalty to the American cause. City tensions increased with the bombing of the governor's mansion in 1917, and suspects affiliated with the Industrial Workers of the World militant party were detained and jailed, although never convicted. When the war ended in 1918, the city celebrated the return of the 363rd Infantry regiment of the 91st Division and the visit of president Woodrow Wilson, who arrived to advocate his League of Nations proposal in 1919 in the face of staunch opposition headed by Governor Johnson and Sacramento Bee editor Charles Kenny McClatchy. The coming of the 1917 American intervention in World War I exponentially increased demand for Curtiss JN-4 biplanes. A contract with the government led to the opening of Mather Air Force Base in the county, and Sacramento grew to rely on the biplanes for continued economic growth up until the end of the war. Surplus military equipment, including the biplanes, were put to use by the Sacramentan populace. In 1929, farmers in the Sacramento area experimented with crop seeding via aerial means; notably, Chinese revolutionary Sun Yatsen, with assistance from Delta farmer Jack Chew, purchased ten surplus aircraft and held sessions for maneuver practice from a local alfalfa field with local Chinese pilots. A growing civilian fascination with aviation in the era was fed by the numerous air shows that were held around the Sacramento area.

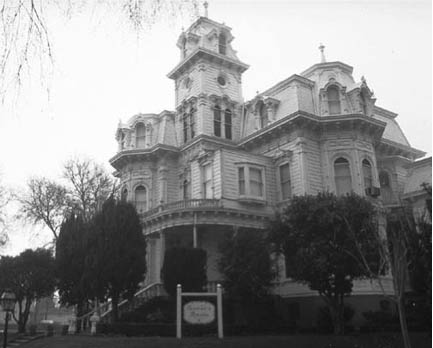
The California Governor's Mansion as seen in 1981. It was bombed in 1917.

In 1920, Sacramento adopted a new charter government that dictated the creation of nine positions on a new Sacramento City Council along with a paid city manager position, which would be held by Illinois journalist Clyde Seavey after the initial rechartering of the government in 1911 that formed five elected nonpartisan commissioner positions failed to effectively serve the city. These actions restricted the power of the mayor and broke the working class' grip over city politics. Seavey pushed strongly for reform, rendering businesses related to clairvoyance nonviable and closing or refusing to license local saloons and poolrooms; Seavey consolidated civic departments to lower the city's budget and reinstated the chain gang punishment to deter crime.

In 1903 the Sacramento Solons a minor league baseball team began to play. The Solons played intermittently in Sacramento between 1903 and 1976, with a continuous stretch between 1918 and 1960. After the end of the Sacramento Solons franchise in 1976, Sacramento went without a minor league baseball team until 2000 when the Sacramento River Cats began playing at Raley Field in West Sacramento.

The eighteenth Constitutional amendment initiated the Prohibition Era in the United States at the end of World War I. As Northern Californian vineyards were major producers of American wines, the significant loss in business forced many, including Sacramento's two largest vineyards, to close; the city was not sympathetic to either prohibition or the temperance movement, although elements of the temperance movement were noticeable in the Sacramento area. In addition, the river front city border with Yolo County, known as the West End, devolved into a slum that was filled, notably, with speakeasies, bordellos, and buildings used for gambling. The slum was regarded one of the worst west of those in Chicago. As an exchange for locating Mather AFB near Sacramento, a member of the United States Department of War demanded that the city deal with the West End's problems.

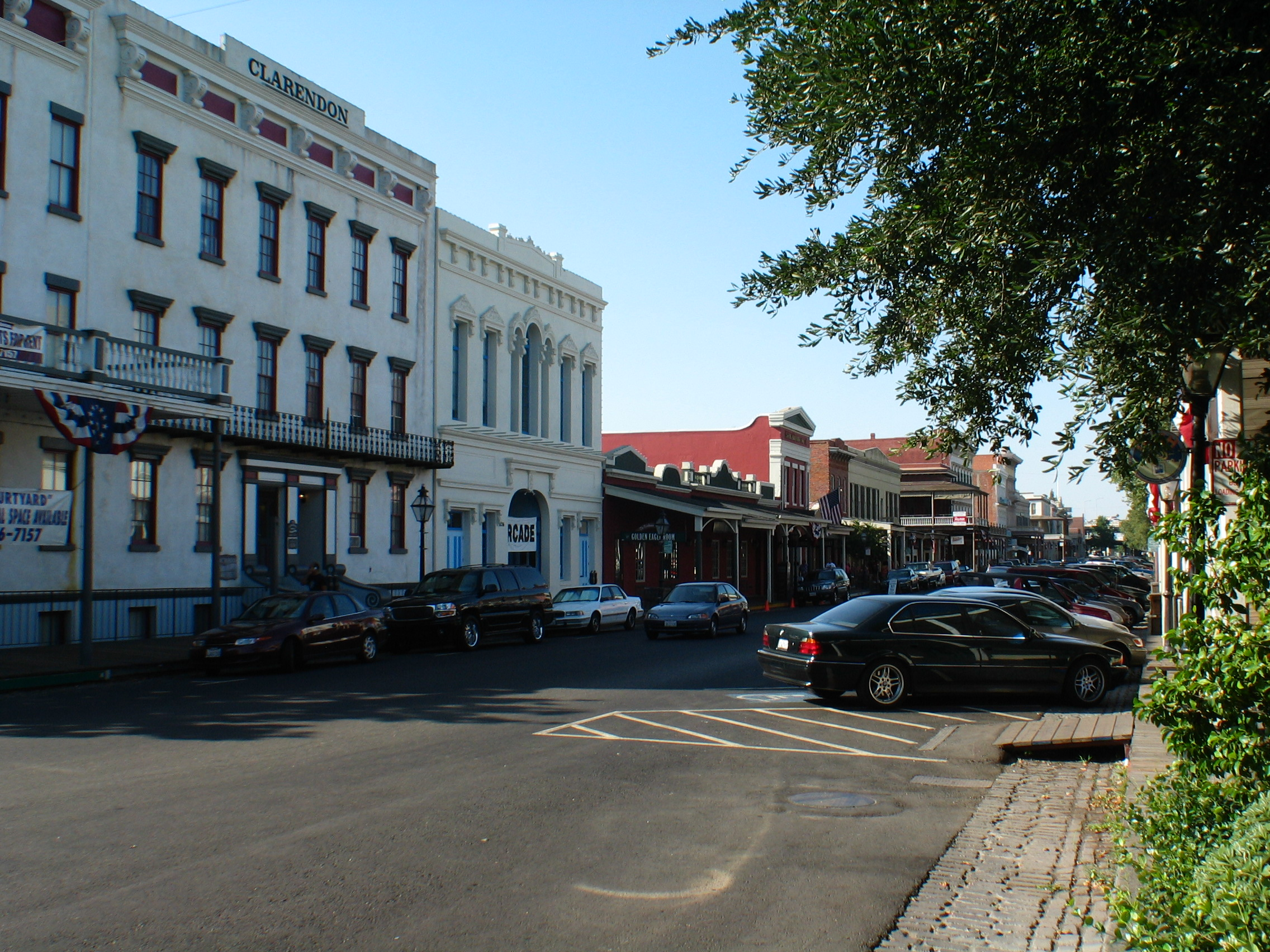
Old Sacramento State Historic Park, previously a slum known as the West End.

The events that followed World War I decreased the popularity for the reformist Progressive movement in the city; hundreds of Sacramentans joined the conservative local chapter Ku Klux Klan. Sacramento's Klansman eyed Catholics, those of more liberal mindsets, and new immigrants with suspicion. However, they worked to portray themselves as anti-racist; notably, the Sacramento Ku Klux Klan helped to paint a local African American church during this time period. Reformers like Seavey worked to dismantle the Ku Klux Klan chapter in Sacramento, although when branded as a "red", Seavey resigned from his position as city manager.

Sacramento grew interconnected with nearby cities like San Francisco, Chico, and Stockton as the automobile continued to grow in popularity; the first bus route in the city opened in between Sacramento and Folsom in 1910, prior to World War I, and, three years prior, the passage of a bond issue made possible the pavement of roads interconnecting settlements in Sacramento County. Wisconsin and Illinois native Arthur Serviss Dudley, who was elected as the executive secretary of the Sacramento Chamber of Commerce, set the city to host the Days of '49 festival in 1922 as a means to convince the city to unite in efforts for urban improvement. A 1915 proposal to filtrate the impure Sacramento tap water passed, and president Calvin Coolidge ceremoniously activated the purification system from Washington, D.C. in 1923. The same year, Sacramento voters approved the creation of SMUD, or the Sacramento Municipal Utility District, a publicly owned utility company which competed with the privately owned Pacific Gas and Electric and Great Western Utility companies.

Sacramento City College was founded in 1916 as the oldest institute of higher education in Sacramento, initially meeting in the upper rooms of Sacramento High School until a bond issue allowed them to construct a new facility when the Sacramento High School moved to a new high school in 1924. The campus was moved to its present location on Freeport Boulevard two years later, alongside a grant that permitted the Sacramento City Unified School District to construct six elementary schools in 1921.

== World War II and the Great Depression – 1931 to 1945 ==
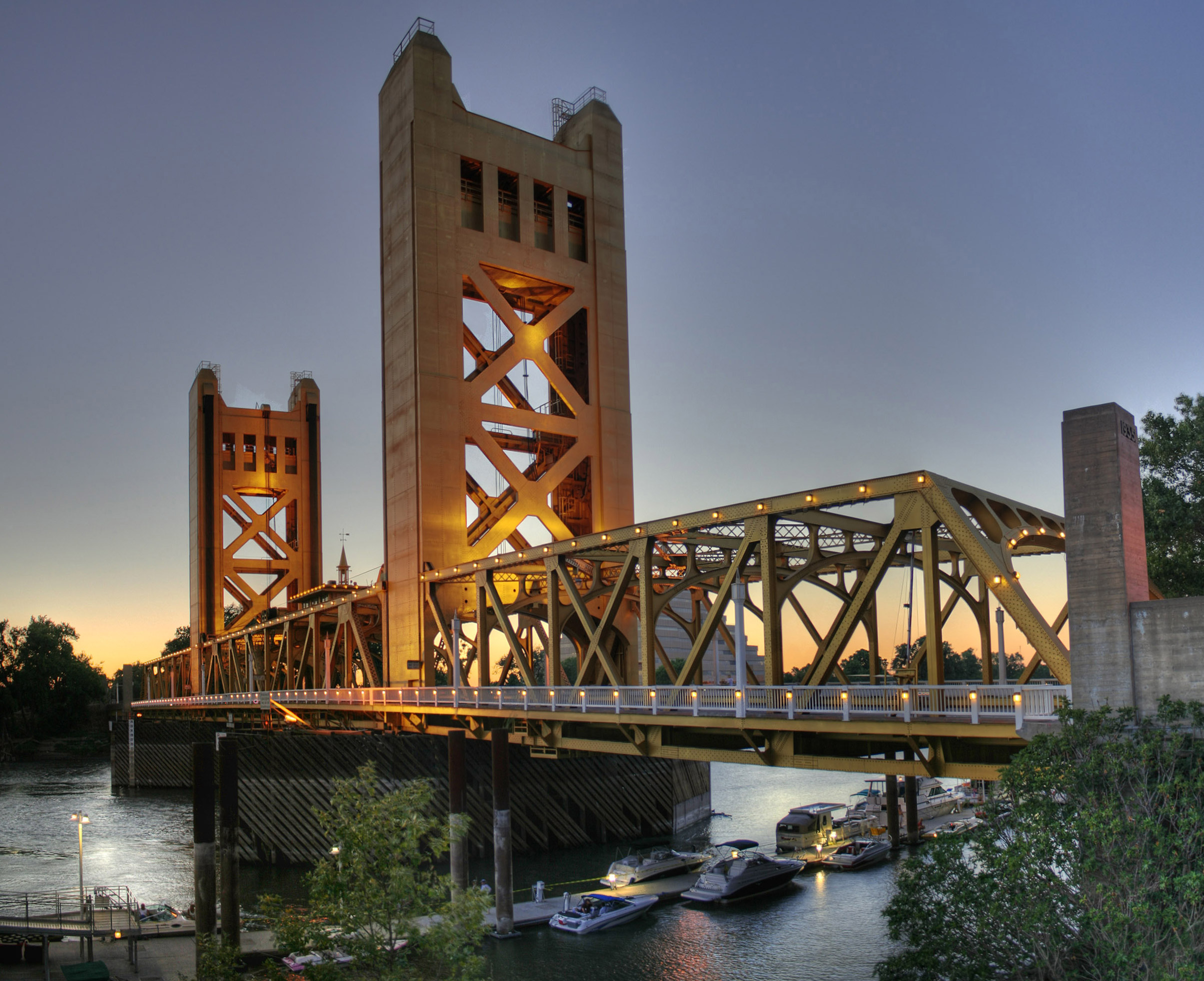
The Tower Bridge, which was completed in 1935.

The Great Depression struck Sacramento alongside the rest of the United States in 1929, driving approximately 15,000 Sacramentans into unemployment by 1932. The local canning industry was affected first as demand for canned goods dropped drastically, laying off workers; a freeze later destroyed half of the Sacramento area's citrus trees in December 1932. Hoovervilles, or large shantytowns created without official authority by homeless people, began appearing across the city. The city of Sacramento in itself did not have to deal with transient vagrants since that was handled by the county government. However, since both entities relied on charities to supply their relief programs, most of the Sacramento area's government-funded programs were discontinued after local charitable organizations began to collapse. When the relief cash flow was stopped, the county's unemployed united to form an Unemployed Council in attempts to pressure the Sacramentan government to increase relief money. The city and county did not comply sufficiently, and large parties of unemployed stormed the Sacramento welfare offices in early and mid-1933. Many of the unemployed who were involved in such activities were labeled as communist or socialist and jailed on a wide range of charges stemming from the communist scare that had set upon the city.

A drastic loss in tax money contributed to Sacramento's application to President Herbert Hoover's Reconstruction Finance Corporation; while this stemmed some economic growth, Sacramento was largely uninvolved with programs in Washington, D.C. until Franklin D. Roosevelt's election to the presidency in 1932. New Deal programs impacted Sacramento's economy greatly; the State Employment Relief Administration and Public Works Administration approved loans for construction and employment in the city.

Initially, long-distance travel was accomplished by train and steamship travel while automobiles composed much local traffic. To accommodate railroad and automobile traffic westwards from the city's downtown across the Sacramento River, the Tower Bridge was erected in 1935; the completion of the bridge facilitated travel between Sacramento and West Sacramento. The bridge, which was funded by the Works Progress Administration, was one of a number of WPA-funded projects, which included 220 miles (350 km) of highway, 46 public buildings, and new runways at local airports. An additional economic boost was provided in the construction of McClellan Air Force Base, which began in 1936 and was completed in 1939, and the reopening of the previously closed Mather AFB in 1936. Additionally, the Sacramento Army Depot was opened in 1942 and later became a major communications equipment repair station under the control of the Signal Corps by 1945.

Pearl Harbor, a deep-water military port nearby Honolulu, Hawaii, was subject to a surprise attack on the morning of December 7, 1941; McClellan AFB was active by 2 pm that day, and hundreds of Martin B-26 Marauders and Curtiss P-40 Warhawks were being readied for battle, destined for assignment in Alaska. Meanwhile, the city government formulated emergency plans; mayor Thomas Monk increased security around public buildings and kept careful watch over the levees on the Sacramento-San Joaquin Delta. The city's first mandated blackout day was on December 8, although the blackouts over Sacramento were not organized or coordinated well until an ordinance issued by Sacramento County established a system to inform its residents accurately when blackouts would start and end. Rationing and conservation of resources impacted the Sacramentan economy significantly; the federal government confiscated 85% of retail profits for war.

Executive Order 9066 was implemented in February 1942, which stated that "any and all persons may be excluded" from "military zones," which were stated to be the western region of Pacific Coast states and in Arizona. A crackdown followed the issue of the order almost immediately; Japanese businessmen and workers were arrested, Japanese-owned businesses were liquidated, and Japanese-owned financial assets were frozen. Internment processes followed suit one month later when Sacramento was placed into a military zone as dictated by Order 9066.

== 1946 to present ==
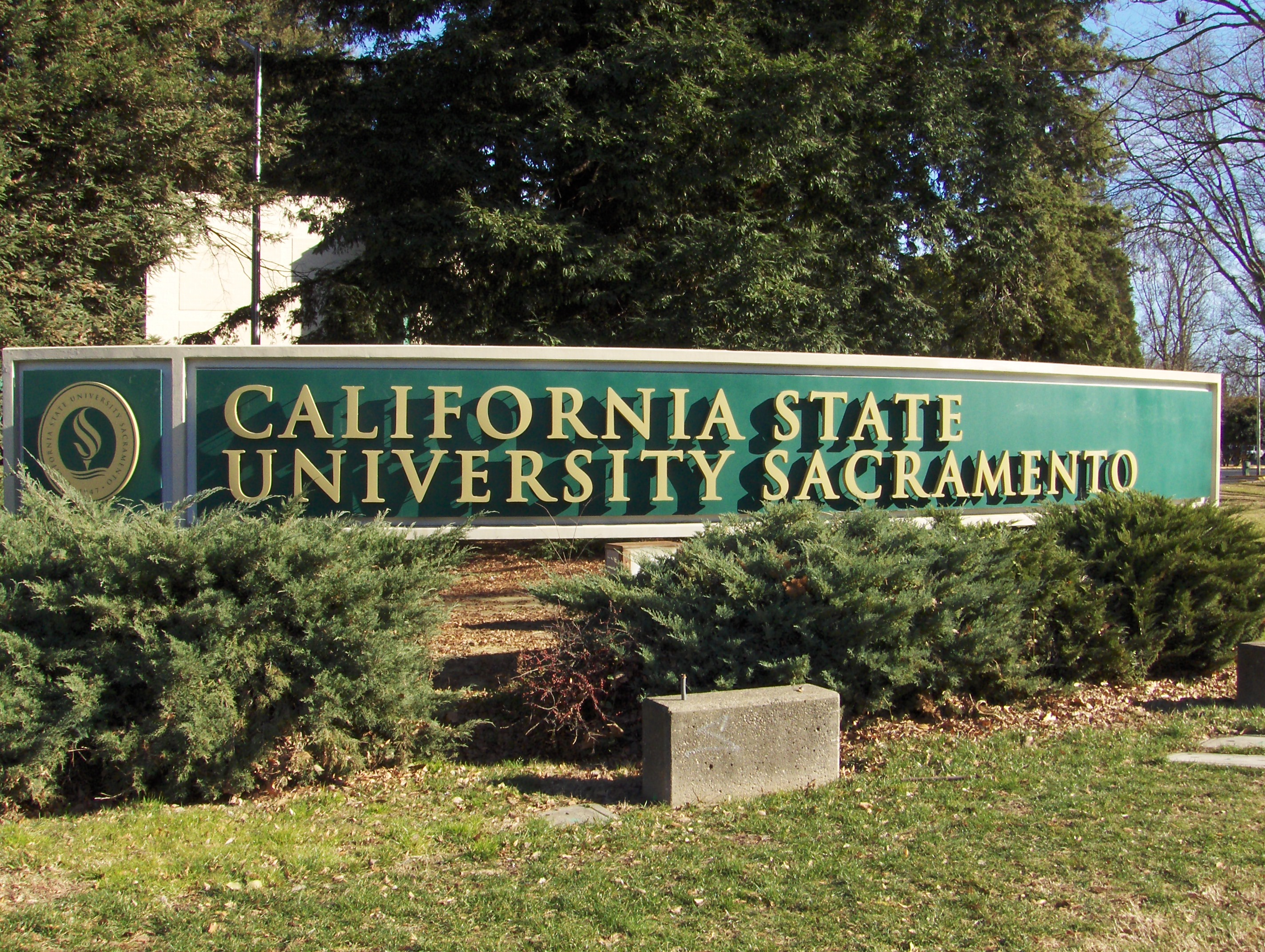
California State University, Sacramento main entrance

Sacramento's preeminent university, California State University, Sacramento (alias Sac State), was founded in 1947.

In 1966, Sacramento was the endpoint of a civil rights march of the United Farm Workers (UFW) led by Cesar Chavez. In the 1990s Joe Serna, Sacramento's first Hispanic mayor, named a park in Downtown Sacramento after Chávez.

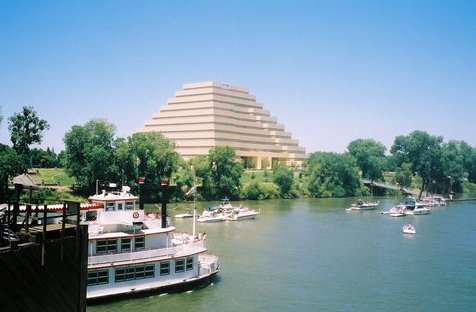
July 4 on Sacramento River 2002

The Sacramento Kings NBA basketball franchise moved to Sacramento in 1985, and are currently Sacramento's only major professional sports team, though the city is home 2 professional minor league franchises, Sacramento Republic FC and the Sacramento River Cats. A new arena for the Kings, Golden 1 Center, was built in time for the opening of the 2016-2017 NBA season, and it appears to be fostering in a new era of growth in Sacramento. Sacramento Republic FC is expected to secure a MLS expansion bid, and build a privately owned stadium in the railyards area.

Despite recent economic woes, Sacramento is still growing very rapidly, and new homes continue to be built in the city as well as in rapidly expanding suburbs such as Natomas, Elk Grove, Folsom, Roseville, Citrus Heights, Rocklin, Lincoln, and Rancho Cordova. One plan for the city's future suggests building a massive park in Downtown Sacramento called Gold Rush Park which would rival in size the largest municipal parks in the nation.

== See also ==
- History of California
- Timeline of Sacramento, California
- Old Sacramento Chinatown
- Bibliography of California history

== Referenced works ==
- Starr, Kevin, California: A History. Modern Library, 2005.
- Severson, Thor (1973). Sacramento: An Illustrated History: 1839 to 1874. California Historical Society. ISBN 0-910312-22-2.
- Various, Authors (1973). Old Sacramento and Downtown. Sacramento, California: California Historical Society. ISBN 0-7385-3123-5.
- Flynn, Dan (1994). Inside Guide to Sacramento: The Hidden Gold of California's Capital. Sacramento, California: Embarcadero Press. ISBN 0-9643150-7-6.
- Avella, Steven (2003). Sacramento: Indomitable City. Charleston, South Carolina: Arcadia Publishing. ISBN 0-7385-2444-1.
