= Heinrich Lienhard =

Swiss immigrant to the United States (1822-1903)

Johann Heinrich Lienhard
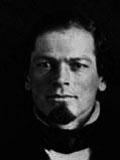
- Born: January 19, 1822; Bilten, Canton of Glarus, Switzerland
- Died: December 19, 1903 (aged 81); Nauvoo, Illinois, United States
- Known for: Description of the California Trail and the California Gold Rush

Johann Heinrich Lienhard (January 19, 1822, Bilten, Canton Glarus – December 19, 1903, Nauvoo, Illinois) was a Swiss immigrant to the United States. He left Switzerland at the age of 21. His memoirs for the years 1822 to 1850 are an important historical source regarding California Trail and Sutter's Fort in California from 1846 to 1850.

== Biography ==
Johann Heinrich Lienhard was born on 19 January 1822 in Switzerland at the hamlet Ussbühl near Bilten, Canton Glarus. He spent his childhood and youth together with his three siblings on the farm of his parents. Knowing that several of his cousins had emigrated to America, his childhood dream of following their example came true when he left Switzerland in 1843 and traveled to New Switzerland, later Highland, in Illinois.

He spent the next two and a half years mainly at that place, it being a time of adjusting to new conditions. At first Lienhard worked as a farm hand and later left the Swiss settlement on occasion to travel up the Mississippi, taking on several jobs along the way in the hope of finding better-paid work. In the spring of 1846, while working in a shop in St. Louis, he met some old friends from Galena with whom only a year before he had talked about emigrating to California. They were just then preparing for that venture, and little effort was needed on their part to persuade him to join them in their undertaking.

The journey of the "Five German Boys," as Heinrich Lienhard and his four companions were called by the other emigrants, lasted six months and led them from Independence, Missouri, to New Helvetia, also called Sutter's Fort, in California. In 1846, there was no fully established trail yet to that Mexican domain for emigrants, let alone for their oxen-drawn wagons, so that especially the second half of the way required the utmost effort and skill of humans and animals alike. In his reminiscences Lienhard describes the exact route and various aspects of daily life on the trail such as the shifting relationships among the emigrants, the encounters with the Indians, the changing landscapes as well as the trials and dangers travelers faced on difficult passages such as the Great Salt Lake Desert and the Sierra Nevada.

Even before arriving at Sutter's Fort, the emigrants were met by a recruiting agent of the United States Army. Urged on by a companion to whom he owed money, Lienhard too signed up for a three months' service in the American military then engaged in war against Mexico in order to annex all its claimed possessions north of the Rio Grande. On the trek to Monterey, however, Lienhard became severely ill and barely survived the ordeal. On his return from Monterey in February 1847, he entered the service of the Swiss John Augustus Sutter (1803–1880). For the next six months he tended Sutter's fruit and vegetable garden on the Yuba River, then served several months as his mayor-domo at the Fort, and briefly also as a supercargo on Sutter's wheat laden schooner traveling to San Francisco. In January 1848 gold was discovered at Coloma where Sutter's sawmill was being built. At that time Lienhard was planting and tending a new garden of fruit trees, vines, vegetables, and flowers near the Fort. He was to join the miners only in August and, like others, in partnership with Sutter.

When Sutter's oldest son John Augustus Sutter, Jr. arrived from Switzerland in September, Sutter, Sr. asked Lienhard to lend him his half of the gold he had mined, so that Sutter could impress his son with a large amount of the precious metal. However, when Lienhard later went to the Fort, Sutter, Jr., having taken charge of his father's debt-ridden business, was unable to return his share of the gold to him. Lienhard finally accepted Sutter's flock of sheep instead and spent the following winter with Jacob Dürr, also a Swiss, at the sheep farm not far from the Fort.

In April 1849 Lienhard and Dürr went as partners to the mines to trade the sheep. Several weeks later Lienhard sold out to Dürr and, back at the Fort, acquiesced in Sutter, Jr.'s request of going to Europe in order to bring the rest of his family to California. Heinrich Lienhard left San Francisco in June 1849, traveling via the Isthmus of Panama to New York and from there via England and Germany to Switzerland. Taking the same route, he returned to San Francisco in January 1850. Only half a year later he decided to leave violence-ridden California for good. Although he loved its climate, prairies, valleys, and mountains, he could not tolerate the lawlessness as well as the exploitation and destruction of the indigenous peoples. On the last day of 1850 and after a journey of six months he was back at his parental home in Switzerland.

In summer 1851 Heinrich Lienhard married Elsbeth Blumer of Bilten. They purchased a homestead in Kilchberg near Zurich, where in 1852 their first son Caspar Arnold and the following year John Henry were born. In September 1853, however, the Lienhards sold their farm and in April 1854 left Zurich, first settling for two years in Madison, Wisconsin, where in 1855 they had their third son, John Jacob. In 1856 they moved to Nauvoo, Illinois, on the Mississippi, where Heinrich Lienhard was to live for 47 years as a well-to-do farmer and respected citizen. In Nauvoo he and Elsbeth Lienhard had six more children, but they lost their oldest son in 1878 and their daughter Dora in 1884. In the same year Lienhard's wife died and in 1892 the youngest daughter Barbara Adela died as well. Heinrich Lienhard died on 19 December 1903 after a brief illness and, like his wife and seven of their children, was buried in Nauvoo's Presbyterian cemetery.

== Heinrich Lienhard's manuscript ==
In the mid-1870s Heinrich Lienhard began to chronicle the experiences of the first 29 years of his life from his childhood and youth in Switzerland up to his return home from California in 1850. In regular and fluent old German script, he filled nearly one thousand pages over several years, thus leaving behind a substantial legacy.

Wherever Lienhard happened to be during his years of traveling, his full attention was drawn to nature in all its variety, to landscapes, climatic conditions, soil quality, geological details, and plants and animals previously unknown to him, while many passages of his account deal with people, with lasting friendships as well as with brief, yet unforgettable encounters. With these portraits he created a monument to many of his friends and acquaintances who otherwise would long be forgotten, portraits, which always reflect his own personality, too. This shows itself in his relationship with the founder of New Helvetia John A. Sutter, whom he got to know well.

Lienhard's keen sense of observation was not limited to outward features, but involved his heart and mind as well. Although he respected the indigenous people from the start as the natives of the land, his early comments are not free from the typical ethnocentric views of the whites. Gradually his perspective changed, especially during his stay at Mimal on the Yuba River, where he lived for six months in isolation from white settlers and in close contact with the indigenous peoples of the surrounding villages. Some gathered regularly at his house, observed his activities with interest, traded, or occasionally helped with garden work. They taught him to become a first-rate archer, now and then took him along to their families, and nursed him back to health when he fell ill. Thus Lienhard began to observe their daily life and marveled at their skill in basketry, hunting and fishing. He often joined them in those pursuits and describes their methods of procuring and preparing food. His observations led him to understand that these people had organized their style of life in creative symbiosis with their surroundings, that their customs, though different, were ingenious, and that assessing them from a culturally biased vantage point did not do them justice. His growing understanding was extraordinary and increasingly run counter to the then dominant views. One night in the winter of 1848–49, he overheard his young Indian herdsmen talking of the times before the whites had invaded their valleys and of the ever worsening conditions. "The subdued talk of the Indians caused me to ponder," he wrote. "In my thoughts I tried to put myself in the position of the Indians; and I wondered whether I would acquiesce if I were driven out of my and my ancestors' homeland as had been the fate of the poor Indians. I confess that I was overwhelmed by strong feelings of revenge, always coming to the conclusion that I would take revenge on the shameless, greedy invaders in every possible way." He knew from first-hand experience, however, that cooperation, escape, or resistance could all mean death for indigenous people.

Thus Lienhard's text can be read on two levels. First, as a detailed account of landscapes, fauna, flora, and peoples of the northern Western Hemisphere and the events of the Anglo-American conquest of those lands. Secondly, it can be read as a complex reflection on racial conquest, wrestling with white intruders' destruction of the environment, of animals, of indigenous peoples and their millennia-old communities, and describing with clarity their forced servitude, sexual exploitation of the indigenous women, expulsion, and death.

== Publications ==
In 1949, a granddaughter sold Heinrich Lienhard's manuscript to the Bancroft Library in Berkeley, California, where it is accessible in its original form as well as on microfilm. Yet it had already awakened the interest of people outside the family in Lienhard's own lifetime. The first to deal with the text was Kaspar Leemann, a friend from Lienhard's days in Kilchberg (1850–54), whose edition was published in 1898, a reprint in 1900. However, Leemann's version contains many errors of transcription, substantial omissions, changes and additions, so that the original is often barely recognizable. Lienhard, then approaching his eighties, was deeply disappointed as notes in the margins of his personal copy reveal.

In the United States the first partial edition, prepared by Marguerite E. Wilbur, was published in 1941 as A Pioneer at Sutter's Fort, 1846–1850: The Adventures of Heinrich Lienhard. Wilbur translated the sections relating to Lienhard's stay in California, excluding his trip to Switzerland in 1849. On the whole she follows the original, yet often omits episodes that, according to her judgment, "proved to be of slight historic value." This severely weakens, partially falsifies the text and also seriously damages its authenticity.

In 1951 J. Roderic Korns and Dale L. Morgan used Lienhard's original text―in their view "a record of the highest importance"―as a source in their research on the "Hastings Cutoff" since Lienhard and his friends were among the first to cross that section of the trail. In 1961 Erwin G. and Elisabeth K. Gudde edited a textually accurate, if somewhat uninspired translation of the trail under the title From St. Louis to Sutter's Fort. In their preface they characterize Lienhard's text as "one of the three classical reports of the great western migration of 1846."

John C. Abbott's book New Worlds to Seek, issued in the year 2000, is a translation of Lienhard's text about his youth and his years in Highland, Illinois. In 2010 Christa Landert published a partial German edition, titled "Wenn Du absolut nach Amerika willst, so gehe in Gottesnamen!". It represents about half of the manuscript and covers the years 1846 to 1849, that is, Lienhard's travel from Missouri to California and his stay in California during the early years of the Anglo-American takeover.

Two newspaper articles written by Heinrich Lienhard were published independently of his manuscript. The first appeared in the Glarner Zeitung after his short stay in Switzerland in 1849. It gives a first-hand account of California, Sutter's Fort, the discovery of gold, and life in the mines as well as the most advantageous route to California, undoubtedly then of much interest for many readers. The second article appeared in 1885 in the San Francisco Daily Examiner. Lienhard had sent it as a letter to the editor to recall that eventful time of the gold discovery and the beginning of the gold rush.
