= Statue of John Sutter =

Statue in Sacramento, US, 1987 to 2020

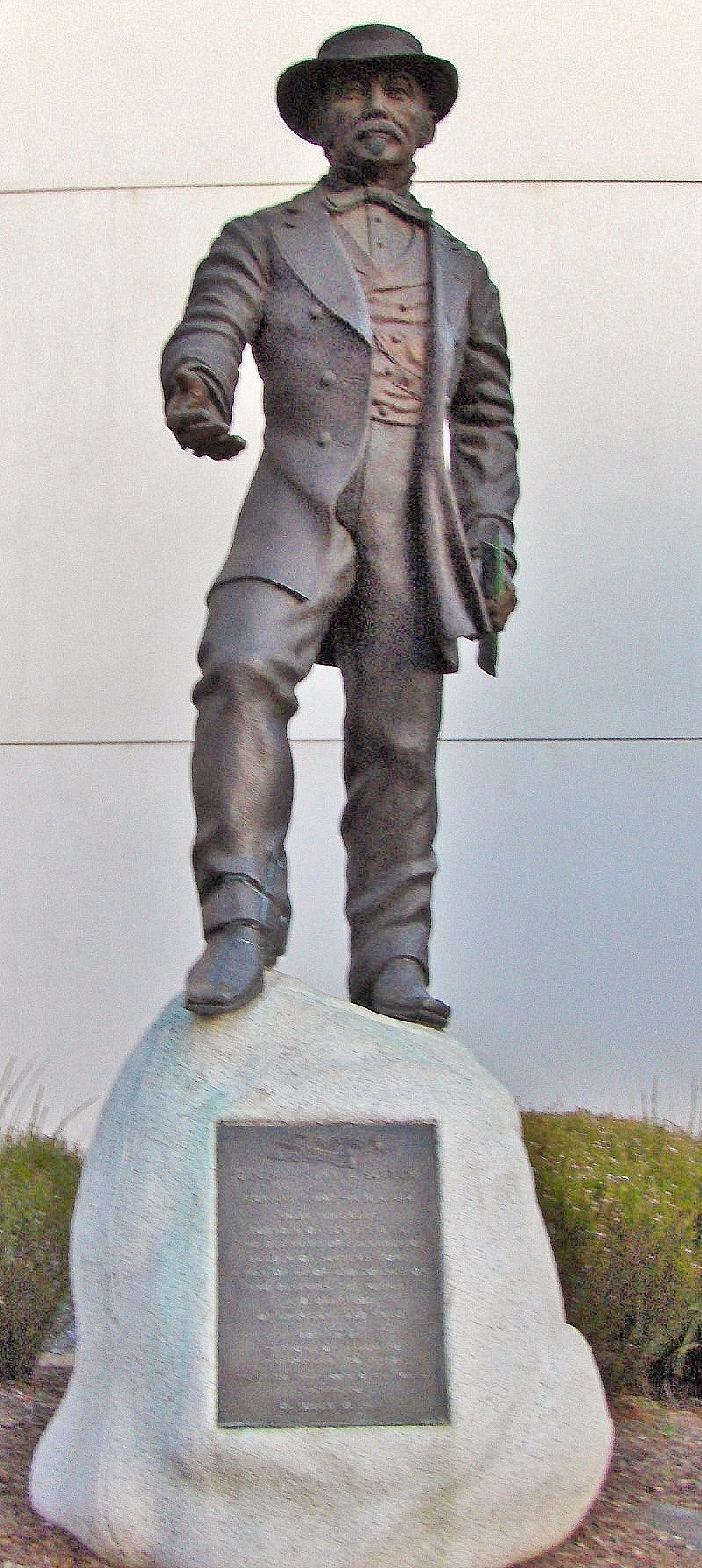
- Year: 1987
- Subject: John Sutter
- Dimensions: 240 cm (8 feet)
- Location: Sacramento, California, US

The statue of John Sutter was created in 1987 and installed in Sacramento, California, United States. John Sutter was a colonizer of California during the Gold Rush and the founder of Sutter's Fort. The statue was removed in June 2020 "over claims it represents slavery and oppression".

== See also ==
- List of monuments and memorials removed during the George Floyd protests
