= John Sutter =

Swiss pioneer of California

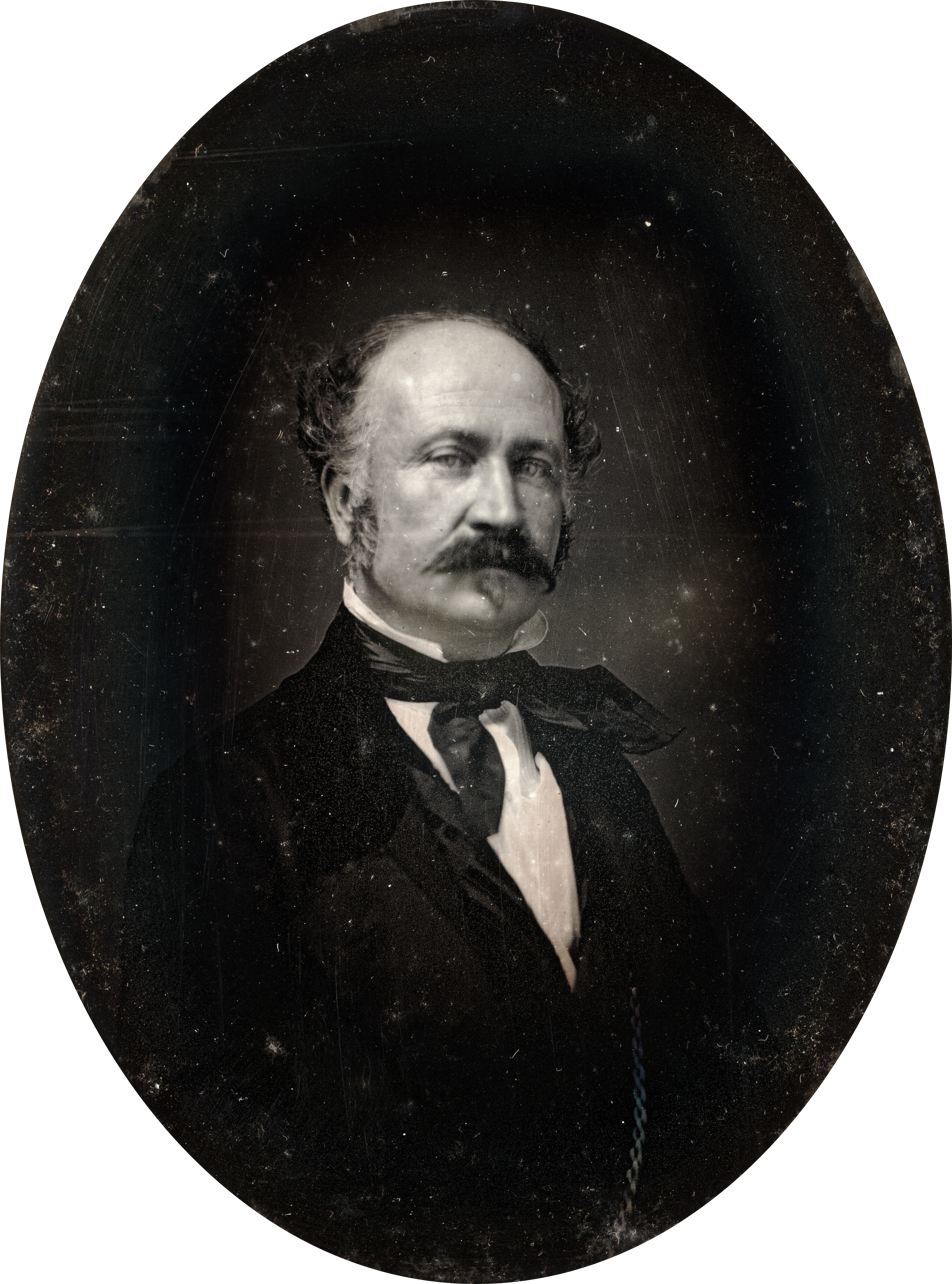
- Sutter c. 1850
- Born: Johann August Sutter; February 23, 1803; Kandern, Margraviate of Baden, Holy Roman Empire
- Died: June 18, 1880 (aged 77); Washington, D.C., U.S.
- Resting place: Moravian Cemetery; Lititz, Pennsylvania
- Citizenship: Swiss; Mexican; American
- Occupations: Pioneer, businessman, landowner
- Known for: Founder of Sutter's Fort
- Spouse: Annette Dubeld (m. 1826)
- Children: 5, including John Augustus Sutter Jr.

John Augustus Sutter (February 23, 1803 – June 18, 1880), born Johann August Sutter and known in Spanish as Don Juan Sutter, was a Swiss immigrant who became a Mexican and later an American citizen, known for establishing Sutter's Fort in the area that would eventually become Sacramento, California, the state's capital. His employee James W. Marshall discovered gold, leading to the founding of the mill-making team at Sutter's Mill. Sutter, however, saw his own business ventures fail during the California gold rush, though those of his elder son, John Augustus Sutter Jr., were more successful.

== Early life ==
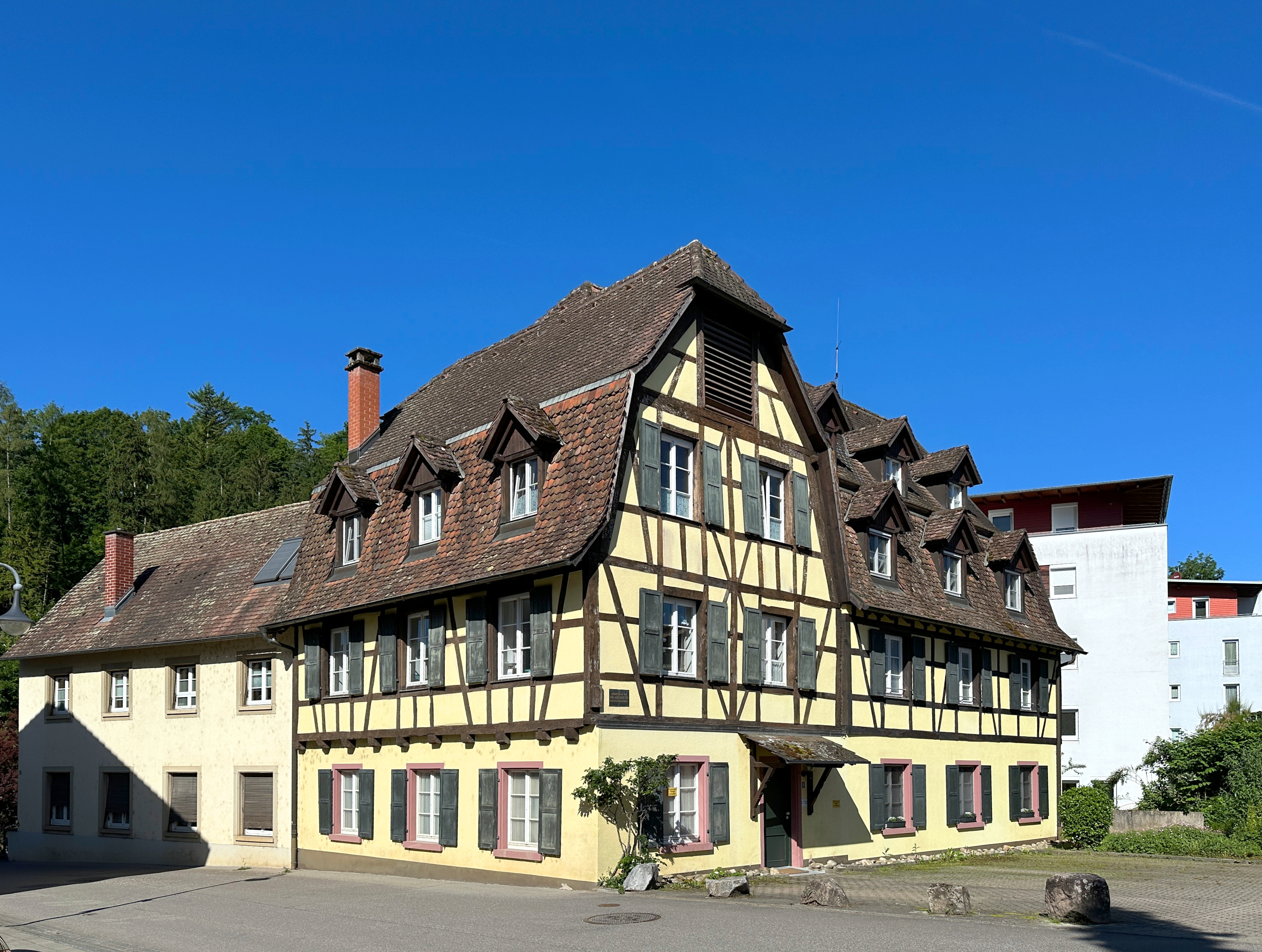
Sutter's birthplace in Kandern, Germany

Sutter was born on February 23, 1803, in Kandern, Baden in present-day Germany, to Johann Jakob Sutter, a foreman at a paper mill, and Christina Wilhelmine Sutter (née Stober). His father came from the nearby town of Rünenberg, in the canton of Basel in Switzerland, and his maternal grandfather was a pastor from Grenzach, on the Swiss-German border.

After attending school in Kandern, Sutter studied at Saint-Blaise from 1818 to 1819. He then worked as an apprentice at the Thurneysen printing and publishing house in Basel until 1823. From 1823 to 1828, he was employed as a clerk in clothing shops in Aarburg and Burgdorf. At age 21, Sutter married the daughter of a wealthy widow. He briefly operated a store but spent more time indulging his interests than managing the business. Facing mounting debts and legal charges that could lead to imprisonment, he fled to America to avoid trial, adopting the name Captain John Augustus Sutter.

In May 1834, he left his wife and five children behind in Burgdorf, Switzerland, and with a French passport, he boarded the ship Sully, which traveled from Le Havre, France, to New York City, where it arrived on July 14, 1834.

== The New World ==
In North America, John Augustus Sutter (as he would call himself for the rest of his life) undertook extensive travels. Before he went to the United States, he had learned Spanish, English, and French. He and 35 Germans traveled from the St. Louis area to Santa Fe, New Mexico (then a province of Mexico), before eventually settling in Westport (modern-day Kansas City). On April 1, 1838, he joined a group of missionaries, led by the fur trapper Andrew Drips, and traveled the Oregon Trail to Fort Vancouver in Oregon Territory, which they reached in October. Sutter originally planned to cross the Siskiyou Mountains during the winter, but acting chief factor James Douglas convinced him that such an attempt would be perilous. Douglas charged Sutter £21 to arrange transportation on the British bark Columbia for himself and his eight followers.

The Columbia departed Fort Vancouver on November 11 and sailed to the Hawaiian Kingdom, reaching Honolulu on December 9. Sutter had missed the only ship outbound for Alta California, and had to remain in the kingdom for four months. Over the months, Sutter developed friendly relations with the European-American community, dining with Consuls of the United States of America and the United Kingdom of Great Britain and Ireland, John Coffin Jones and Richard Charlton, as well as merchants like American Faxon Atherton. The brig Clementine was eventually hired by Sutter to take freight provisions and general merchandise for New Archangel (now known as Sitka), the capital of the Russian-American Company colonies in Russian America. Joining the crew as unpaid supercargo, Sutter, 10 Native Hawaiian laborers, and several other followers embarked on April 20, 1839. Staying at New Archangel for a month, Sutter joined several balls hosted by Governor Kupreyanov, who likely gave help in determining the course of the Sacramento River. The Clementine then sailed for Alta California, arriving on July 1, 1839, at Yerba Buena (now San Francisco), which at that time was only a small seaport town.

=== Beginnings of Sutter's Fort ===
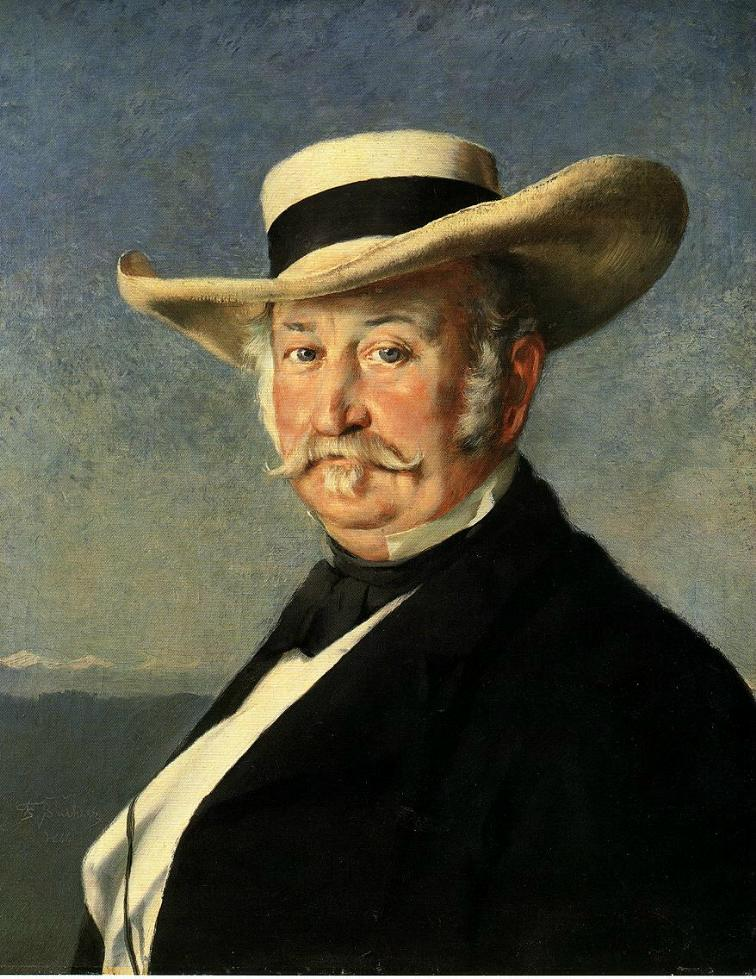
Portrait of John Sutter by Frank Buchser, painted in 1866.

At the time of Sutter's arrival, Alta California was a province of Mexico and had a population of Native Americans estimated at 100,000–700,000. Sutter had to go to the capital at Monterey to obtain permission from the governor, Juan Bautista Alvarado, to settle in the territory. Alvarado saw Sutter's plan of establishing a colony in Central Valley as useful in "buttressing the frontier which he was trying to maintain against Indians, Russians, Americans and British." Sutter persuaded Governor Alvarado to grant him 48,400 acres of land for the sake of curtailing American encroachment on the Mexican territory of California. This stretch of land was called New Helvetia and Sutter was given the right to "represent in the Establishment of New Helvetia all the laws of the country, to function as political authority and dispenser of justice, in order to prevent the robberies committed by adventurers from the United States, to stop the invasion of savage Indians, and the hunting and trading by companies from the Columbia (river)."

The governor required Sutter to meet certain conditions to qualify for land ownership. These included residing in the territory for one year and becoming a Mexican citizen, which Sutter fulfilled on August 29, 1840. After receiving the land grant and building his fort, Sutter did not strictly adhere on his initial agreement to deter European settlers. Instead, he actively supported the migrations of Europeans to California. Sutter later stated, "I gave passports to those entering the country… and this (Bautista) did not like it… I encouraged immigration, while they discouraged it. I sympathized with the Americans while they hated them."

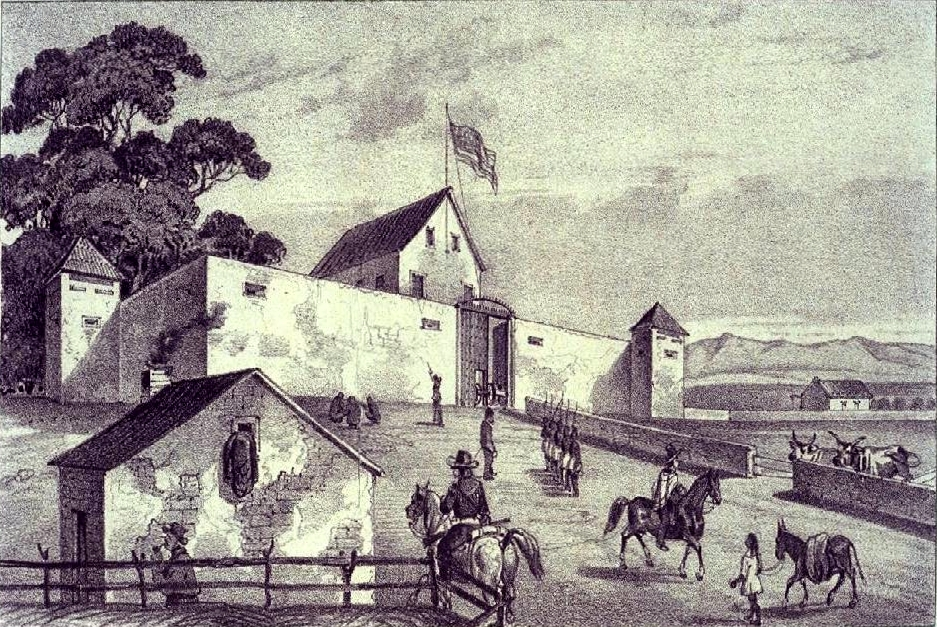
Contemporaneous illustration of Sutter's Fort

Construction began in August 1839 on a fortified settlement which Sutter named New Helvetia, or "New Switzerland," after his homeland. In order to elevate his social standing, Sutter impersonated a Swiss guard officer who had been displaced by the French Revolution and identified himself accordingly as 'Captain Sutter of the Swiss Guard'. When the settlement was completed on June 18, 1841, he received title to 48,827 acres (197.60 km^{2}) on the Sacramento River. The site is now part of the California state capital of Sacramento.

=== Relationship with Native Americans ===
Sutter's Fort had a central building made of adobe bricks, surrounded by a high wall with protection on opposite corners to guard against attack. It also had workshops and stores that produced necessary goods for the New Helvetia settlement.

Sutter employed or enslaved Native Americans of the Miwok, Maidu, Nisenan, and Ohlone tribes, the Hawaiians (Kanakas) he had brought, and also employed some Europeans at his compound. He envisioned creating an agricultural utopia, and for a time the settlement was in fact quite large and prosperous. Prior to the Gold Rush, it was the destination for most immigrants entering California via the high passes of the Sierra Nevada, including the ill-fated Donner Party of 1846, for whose rescue Sutter contributed supplies.

In order to build his fort and develop a large ranching/farming network in the area, Sutter relied on Indian labor. Some Native Americans worked voluntarily for Sutter (e.g. Nisenans, Miwoks, Ochecames), but others were subjected to varying degrees of coercion that resembled slavery or serfdom. Sutter believed that Native Americans had to be kept "strictly under fear" in order to serve white landowners. Housing and working conditions at the fort were very poor, and have been described as "enslavement", with uncooperative Indians being "whipped, jailed, and executed." Sutter's Native American "employees" slept on bare floors in locked rooms without sanitation, and ate from troughs made from hollowed tree trunks. Housing conditions for workers living in nearby villages and rancherías was described as being more favorable. Pierson Reading, Sutter's fort manager, wrote in a letter to a relative that “the Indians of California make as obedient and humble slaves as the Negro in the South". If Indians refused to work for him, Sutter responded with violence. Observers accused him of using "kidnapping, food privation, and slavery" in order to force Indians to work for him, and generally stated that Sutter held the Indians under inhumane conditions. Theodor Cordua, a German immigrant who leased land from Sutter, wrote:

"When Sutter established himself in 1839 in the Sacramento Valley, new misfortune came upon these peaceful natives of the country. Their services were demanded immediately. Those who did not want to work were considered as enemies. With other tribes the field was taken against the hostile Indian. Declaration of war was not made. The villages were attacked usually before daybreak when everybody was still asleep. Neither old nor young was spared by the enemy, and often the Sacramento River was colored red by the blood of the innocent Indians, for these villages usually were situated at the banks of the rivers. During a campaign one section of the attackers fell upon the village by way of land. All the Indians of the attacked village naturally fled to find protection on the other bank of the river. But there they were awaited by the other half of the enemy and thus the unhappy people were shot and killed with rifles from both sides of the river. Seldom an Indian escaped such an attack, and those who were not murdered were captured. All children from six to fifteen years of age were usually taken by the greedy white people. The village was burned down and the few Indians who had escaped with their lives were left to their fate."

Heinrich Lienhard, a Swiss immigrant that served as Sutter's majordomo, wrote of the treatment of the enslaved once captured:

"As the room had neither beds nor straw, the inmates were forced to sleep on the bare floor. When I opened the door for them in the morning, the odor that greeted me was overwhelming, for no sanitary arrangements had been provided. What these rooms were like after ten days or two weeks can be imagined, and the fact that nocturnal confinement was not agreeable to the Indians was obvious. Large numbers deserted during the daytime, or remained outside the fort when the gates were locked."

Lienhard also claimed that Sutter was known to rape his Indian captives, even girls as young as 12 years old. Despite the procurement of fertile agriculture, Sutter fed his Native American work force in pig troughs, where they would eat gruel with their hands in the sun on their knees. Numerous visitors to Sutter's Fort noted the shock of this sight in their diaries, alongside their discontent for his kidnapping of Indian children who were sold into bondage to repay Sutter's debts or given as gifts. American explorer and mountain man James Clyman reported in 1846 that:

"The Capt. [Sutter] keeps 600 to 800 Indians in a complete state of Slavery and as I had the mortification of seeing them dine I may give a short description. 10 or 15 Troughs 3 or 4 feet long were brought out of the cook room and seated in the Broiling sun. All the Labourers grate [sic] and small ran to the troughs like so many pigs and fed themselves with their hands as long as the troughs contained even a moisture."

Dr. Waseurtz af Sandels, a Swedish explorer who visited California in 1842–1843, also wrote about Sutter's brutal treatment of Indian slaves in 1842:

"I could not reconcile my feelings to see these fellows being driven, as it were, around some narrow troughs of hollow tree trunks, out of which, crouched on their haunches, they fed more like beasts than human beings, using their hands in hurried manner to convey to their mouths the thin porage [sic] which was served to them. Soon they filed off to the fields after having, I fancy, half satisfied their physical wants."

These concerns were even shared by Juan Bautista Alvarado, then Governor of Alta California, who deplored Sutter's ill-treatment of indigenous Californians in 1845:

"The public can see how inhuman were the operations of Sutter who had no scruples about depriving Indian mothers of their children. Sutter has sent these little Indian children as gifts to people who live far from the place of their birth, without demanding of them any promises that in their homes the Indians should be treated with kindness."

Despite his promises to the Mexican government, Sutter was hospitable to American settlers entering the region, and provided an impetus for many of them to settle there. The hundreds of thousands of acres which these men took from the Native Americans had been an important source of food and resources. As the White settlers were ranching two million head of livestock, shooting wild game in enormous numbers, and replacing wilderness with wheat fields, available food for Indians in the region diminished. In response, some Indians took to raiding the cattle of White ranchers. In August 1846, an article in The Californian declared that in respect to California Indians, "The only effectual means of stopping inroads upon the property of the country, will be to attack them in their villages." On February 28, 1847 Sutter ordered the Kern and Sutter massacres in retaliation.

Much of Sutter's labor practices were illegal under Mexican law. However, on April 22, 1850, following the annexation of California by the United States, the California state legislature passed the "Act for the Government and Protection of Indians," legalizing the kidnapping and forced servitude of Indians by White settlers. In 1851, the civilian governor of California declared, "That a war of extermination will continue to be waged ... until the Indian race becomes extinct, must be expected." This expectation soon found its way into law. An 1851 legislative measure not only gave settlers the right to organize lynch mobs to kill Indians, but allowed them to submit their expenses to the government. By 1852, the state had authorized over a million dollars in such claims.

In 1856, a San Francisco Bulletin editorial stated, "Extermination is the quickest and cheapest remedy, and effectually prevents all other difficulties when an outbreak [of Indian violence] occurs." In 1860, the legislature passed a law expanding the age and condition of Indians available for forced slavery. A Sacramento Daily Union article of the time accused high-pressure lobbyists interested in profiting off enslaved Indians of pushing the law through, gave examples of how wealthy individuals had abused the law to acquire Indian slaves from the reservations, and stated, "The Act authorizes as complete a system of slavery, without any of the checks and wholesome restraints of slavery, as ever was devised."

==== 'Red Star' and 'Bear Flag' revolts ====
===== Lone star rebellion =====
Red-and-white version of the Lone Star of California, as hoisted during the 1842 Alvarado rebellion. Note: In early 1846, Sutter hoisted perhaps the above version if not another in red, white, and green. In published, period recollections, Bear Flag rebel J. William Russell wrote, "When I got to the fort the 'lone star' flag was flying. The colors was made up of the old Mexican flag."

In 1844–1845, there was a revolt of the Mexican colony of California against the army of the mother country.

Two years earlier, in 1842, Mexico had removed California Governor Juan Bautista Alvarado, and sent Brigadier General Manuel Micheltorena to replace him. It also sent an army.

The army had been recruited from Mexico's worst jails, and the soldiers soon began stealing Californians' chickens and other property. Micheltorena's army was described as descending on California "like a plague of locusts, stripping the countryside bare." Californians complained that the army was committing robberies, beatings, and rapes.

In late 1844, the Californios revolted against Micheltorena. He had appointed Sutter as commandante militar. Sutter, in turn, recruited men, one of whom was John Marsh, a medical doctor and owner of the large Rancho los Meganos. Marsh, who sided with the Californios, wanted no part of this effort. However, Sutter gave Marsh a choice: either join the army or be arrested and put in jail.

In 1845, Sutter's forces met the Californio forces at the Battle of Providencia (also known as the Second Battle of Cahuenga Pass). The battle consisted primarily of an artillery exchange, and during the battle Marsh secretly went over to parley with the other side. There was a large number of Americans fighting on both sides. Marsh met with them and convinced the Americans on both sides that there was no reason for Americans to be fighting each other.

The Americans agreed and quit the fight, and as a result, Sutter’s forces lost the battle. The defeated Micheltorena took his army back to Mexico, and Californian Pio Pico became governor.

===== Mexico's loss in the Mexican–American War =====
During the Mexican-American War, Mexico's control over Alta California weakened significantly. Sutter, who identified himself as a French citizen, reportedly considered mustering British, Canadian, and American immigrants, along with Indigenous peoples, to declare New Helvetia an independent republic under French protection. Sutter wrote to US Counsel Jacob Leese in Yerba Buena: "Very curious reports come to me from below but the poor wretches do not know what they do. The first French frigate that comes here will do me justice. The first step they do against me I will make a declaration of Independence and proclaim California a Republic independent of Mexico."

On July 7, 1846, following the Bear Flag Revolt and the Battle of Monterey, Commodore John B. Montgomery raised the American flag in Monterey. Four days later, on July 11, 1846, Sutter raised an American flag at his fort after receiving it from a messenger sent by Montgomery. In August 1846, Sutter formally transferred control of the fort to the United States after receiving a commission as a lieutenant under US Army Captain John C. Frémont. In March 1847, command returned to Sutter.

=== Beginning of the Gold Rush ===
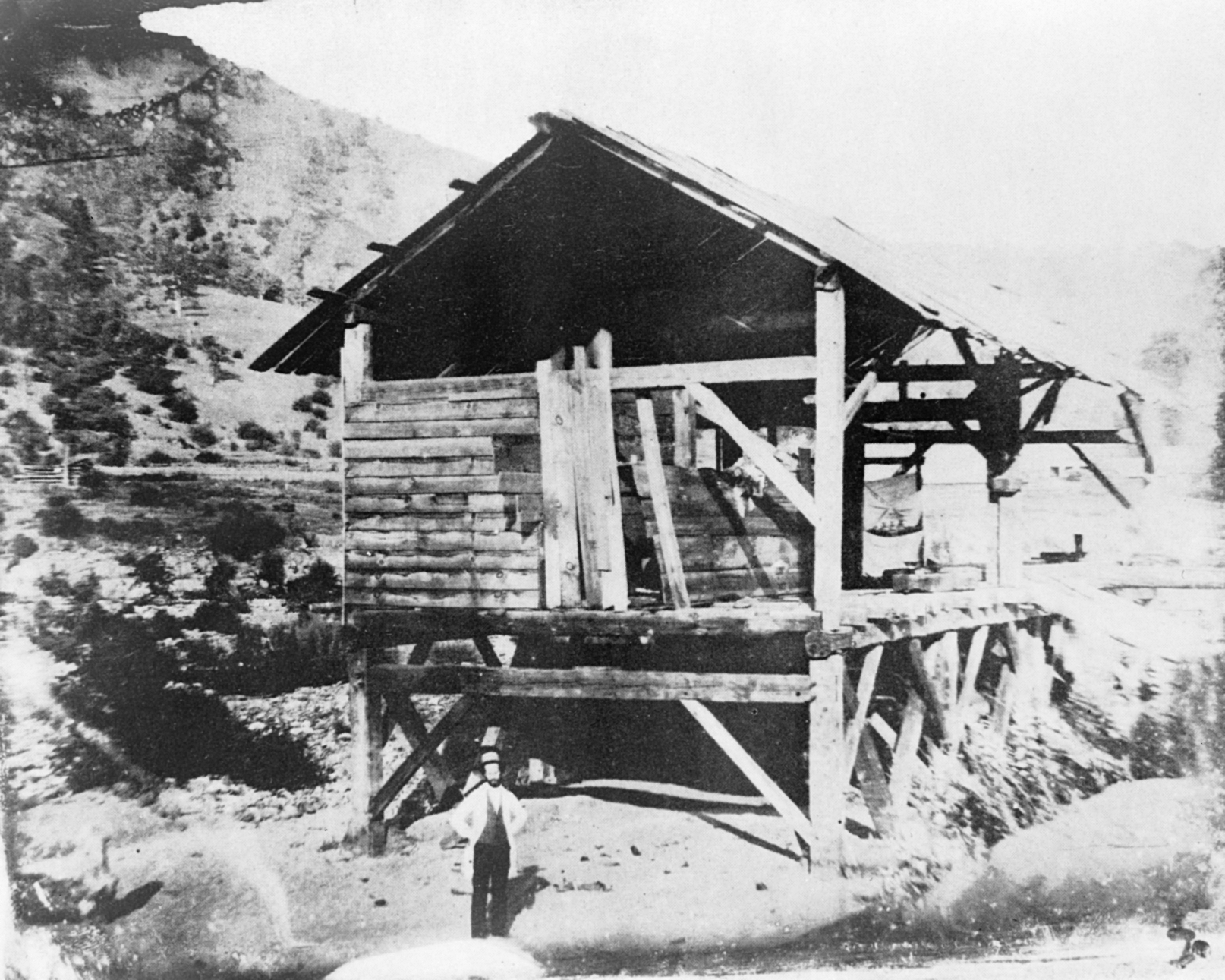
Sutter's Mill in 1850.

In 1848, gold was discovered at Sutter's Mill, by one of Sutter's employees, James W. Marshall. It started when Sutter hired Marshall, a New Jersey native who had served with John C. Frémont in the Bear Flag Revolt, to build a water-driven sawmill in Coloma, along the American River. Sutter was intent on building a city on his property (not yet named Sacramento), including housing and a wharf on the Sacramento River, and needed lumber for the construction. One morning, as Marshall inspected the tailrace for silt and debris, he noticed some gold nuggets and brought them to Sutter's attention. Together, they read an encyclopedia entry on gold and performed primitive tests to confirm whether it was precious metal. Sutter concluded that it was, in fact, gold, but he was very anxious that the discovery not disrupt his plans for construction and farming. At the same time, he set about gaining legitimate title to as much land near the discovery as possible.

Sutter's attempt at keeping the gold discovery quiet failed when merchant and newspaper publisher Samuel Brannan returned from Sutter's Mill to San Francisco with gold he had acquired there and began publicizing the find. Large crowds of people overran the land and destroyed nearly everything Sutter had worked for. To avoid losing everything, Sutter deeded his remaining land to his eldest son, John Augustus Sutter Jr., who had come from Switzerland to join his father in September 1848.

When Sutter Jr. arrived, Sutter Sr. asked his fellow Swiss majordomo Heinrich Lienhard to lend him his half of the gold he had mined, so that the elder Sutter could impress his son with a large amount of the precious metal. However, when Lienhard later went to the Fort, Sutter Jr., having taken charge of his father's debt-ridden business, was unable to return his share of the gold to Lienhard, who finally accepted Sutter's flock of sheep as payment.

The younger Sutter saw the commercial possibilities of the land and promptly started plans for building a new town he named Sacramento, after the Sacramento River. The elder Sutter deeply resented this; he had wanted the town named Sutterville (for both of them) and for it to be built near New Helvetia.

Sutter gave up New Helvetia to pay the last of his debts. He rejoined his family and lived on Hock Farm (north of Sacramento along the Feather River).

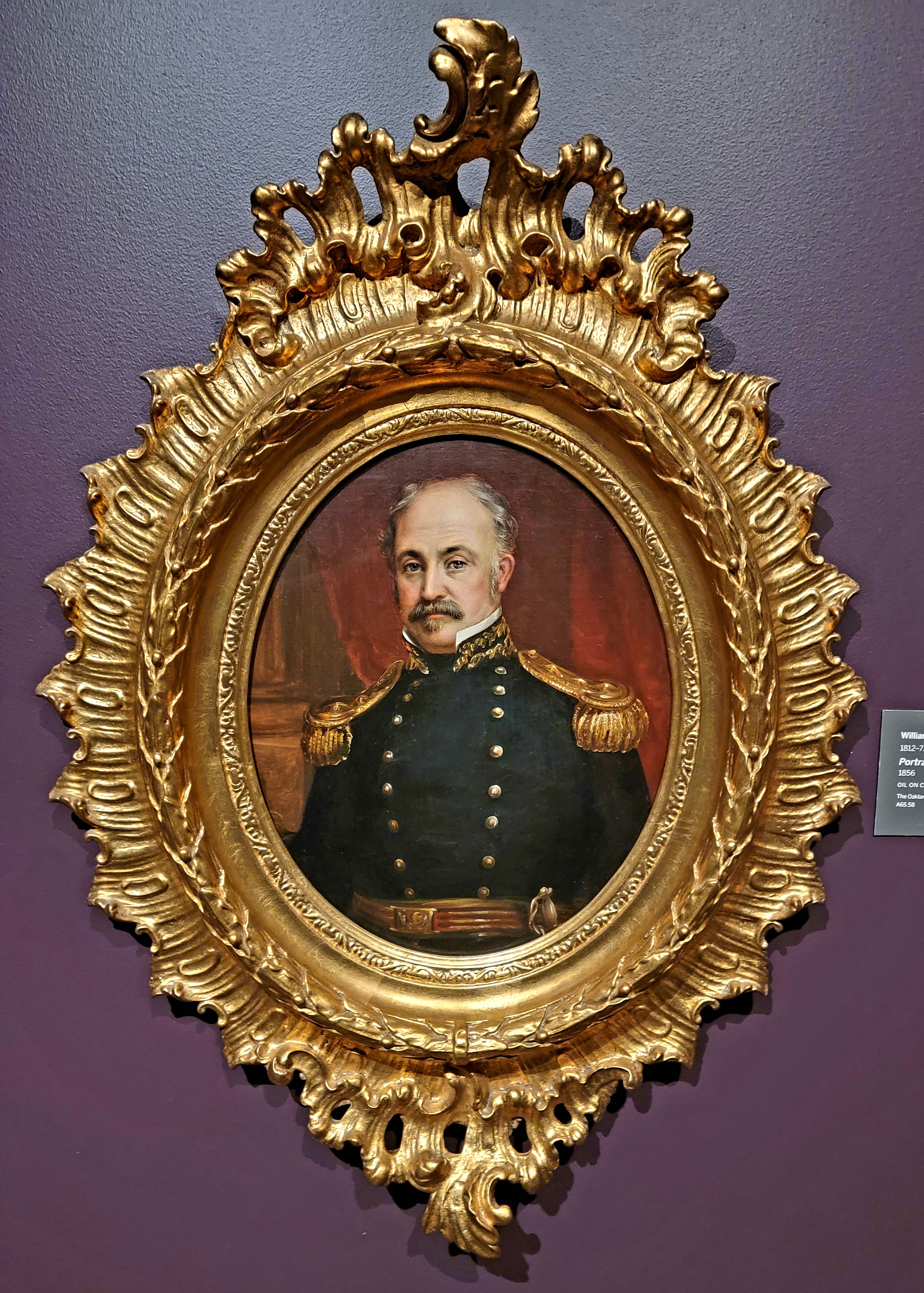
1856 portrait of John A. Sutter in his California Militia uniform at the Oakland Museum of California

In 1853, the California legislature made Sutter a major general in the California Militia.

=== Land grant challenge ===
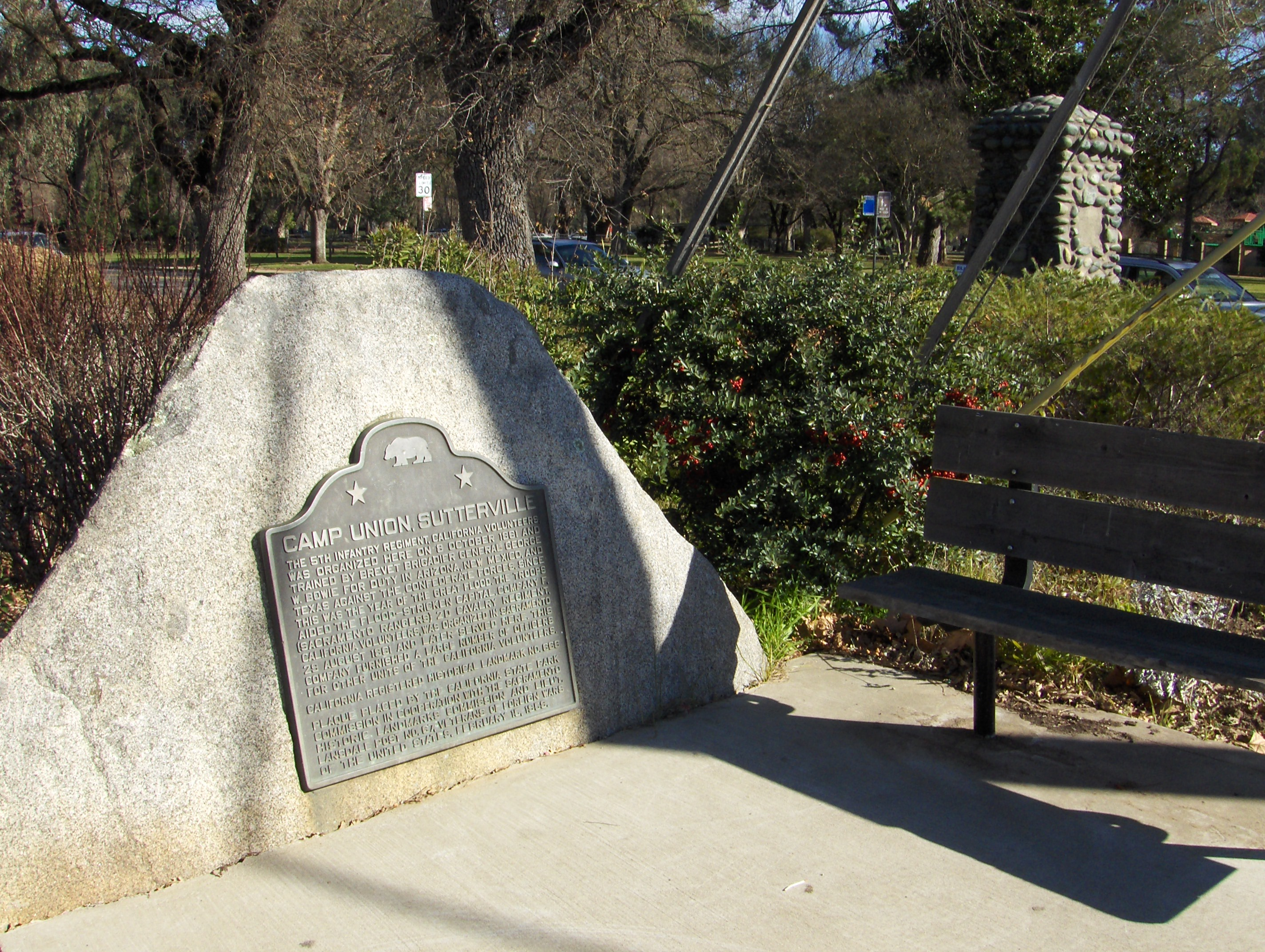
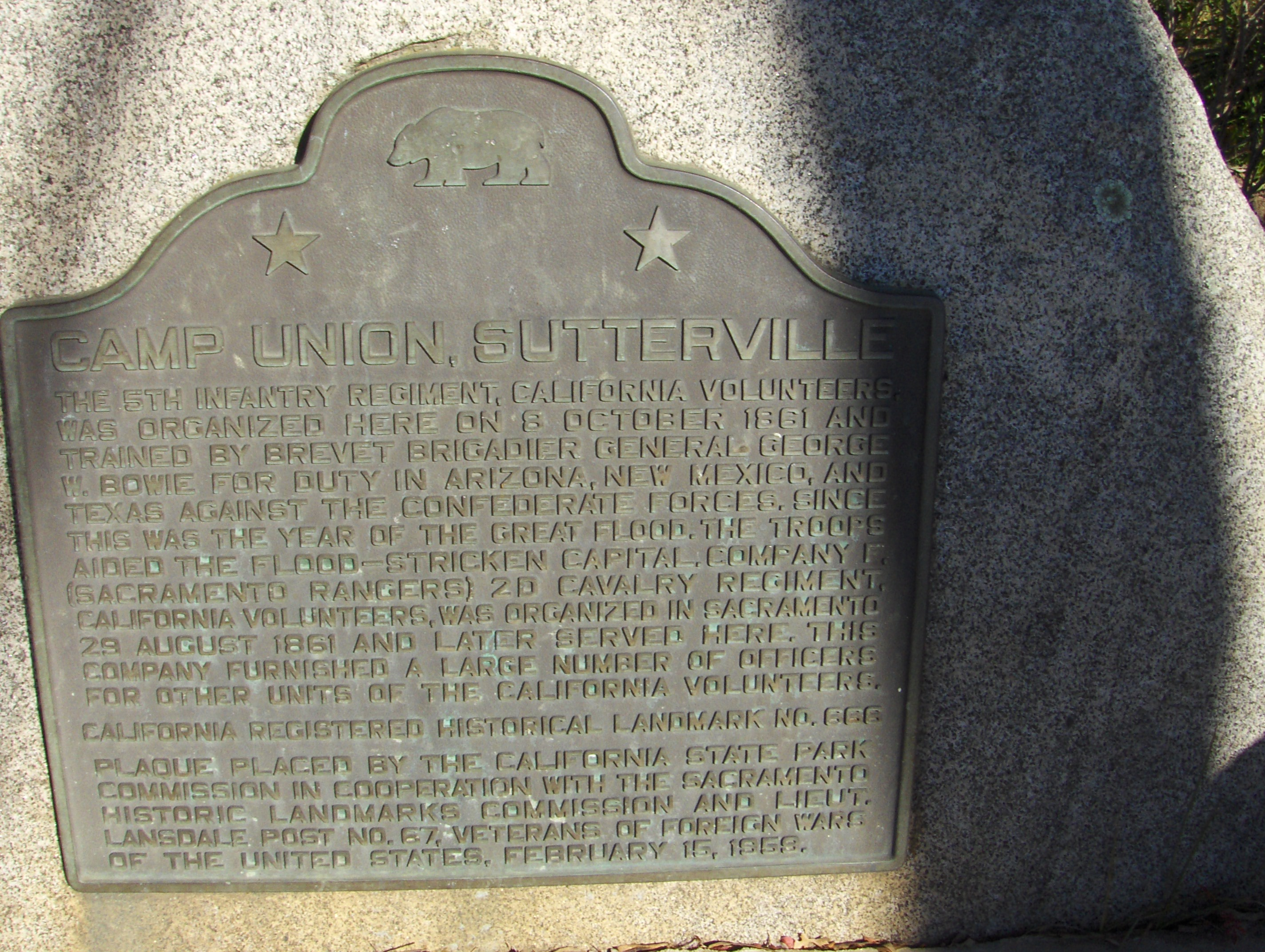
Camp Union, Sutterville State Historical marker.

Sutter's El Sobrante (Spanish for leftover) land grant was challenged by the Squatters' Association, and in 1858 the US Supreme Court denied its validity.

Sutter got a letter of introduction to the Congress of the United States from the governor of California. He moved to Washington, D.C. at the end of 1865, after Hock Farm was destroyed by fire in June of that year. Sutter sought reimbursement of his losses associated with the Gold Rush, and received a pension of US$250 a month as a reimbursement of taxes paid on the El Sobrante grant at the time that Sutter considered it his own.

He and wife Annette moved to Lititz, Pennsylvania in 1871. The proximity to Washington along with the reputed healing qualities of Lititz Springs appealed to the aging Sutter. He also wanted three of his grandchildren (he had grandchildren in Acapulco, Mexico, as well) to have the benefits of the fine private Moravian Schools. Sutter built his home across from the Lititz Springs Hotel (renamed in 1930 as the General Sutter Inn and subsequently as the Lititz Springs Inn & Spa).

After prospectors had destroyed his crops and slaughtered cattle leaving him only his own gold, Sutter spent the rest of his life trying to get the government to pay him for his losses, without success. He continually petitioned Congress for restitution but little was done. On June 16, 1880, Congress adjourned, once again, without action on a bill that would have given Sutter US$50,000 (~$1.39 million in 2024). Two days later, Sutter died in the Mades Hotel in Washington. His body was returned to Lititz and buried adjacent to God's Acre, the Moravian Graveyard; Annette Sutter died the following January and is buried with him.

== Legacy ==
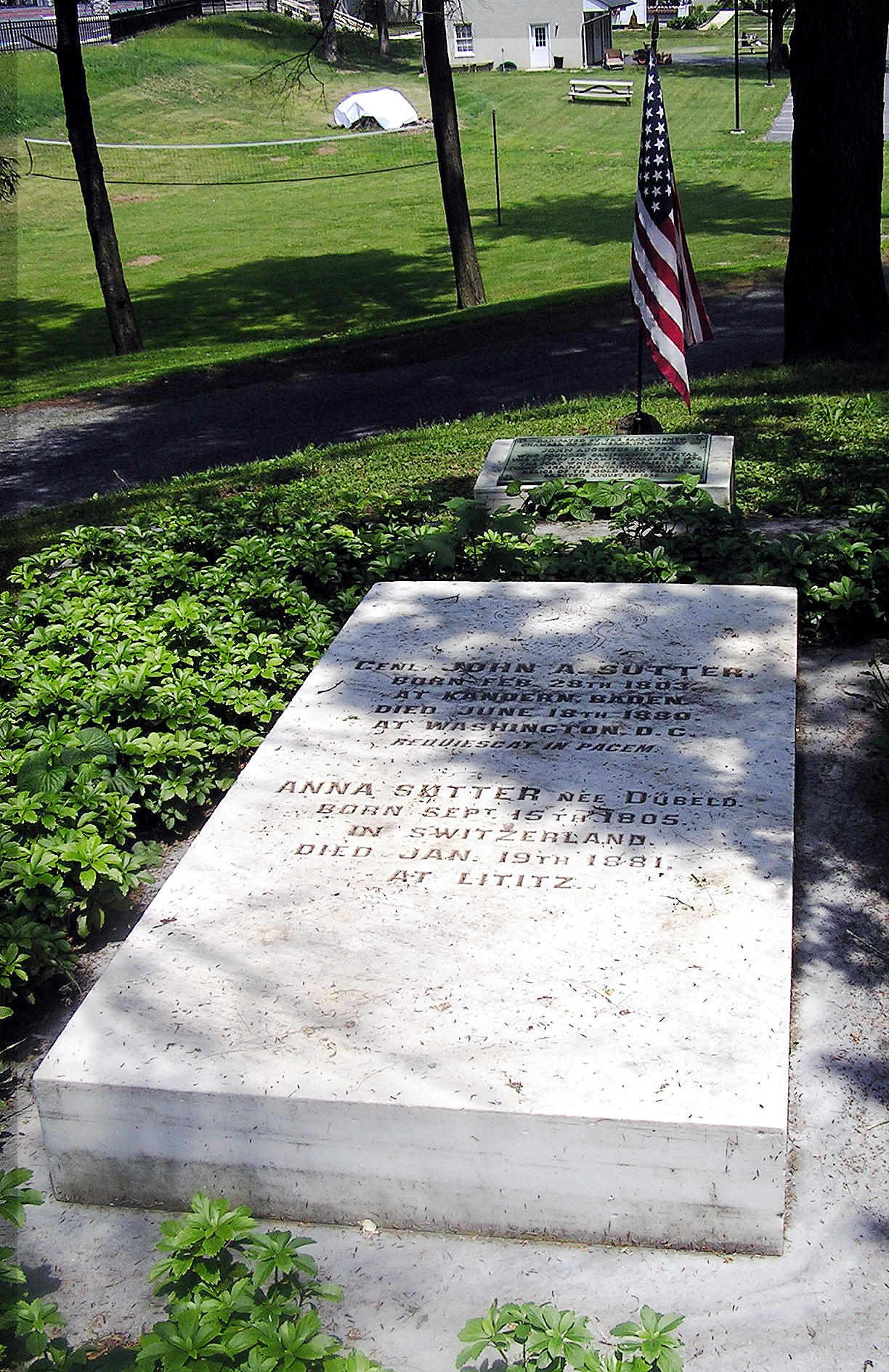
General Sutter's grave in the Lititz, Pennsylvania, Moravian Cemetery

There are numerous California landmarks bearing the name of Sutter: Sutter Street in San Francisco; the Sutterville Bend of the Sacramento River; the non-profit hospital system Sutter Health; the cities of Sutter Creek and Sutter; the Sutter Buttes, a mountain range near Yuba City, California; and Sutter County. In Sacramento, Sutter's Landing; Sutterville Road; Sutter Middle School (renamed Miwok Middle School in 2023); Sutter's Mill School; and Sutterville Elementary School are all named after him. California Governor Jerry Brown, elected to a third term in 2010, had a Welsh corgi named Sutter Brown, affectionately referred to as the First Dog of California.

Beyond California, the property that used to belong to John Augustus Sutter Jr. in Acapulco, Mexico became the Hotel Sutter. The Johann Agust Sutter House in Lititz, Pennsylvania was listed on the National Register of Historic Places in 1982. The 'Sutter's Gold' rose, an orange blend hybrid tea rose bred by Herbert C. Swim, was named after him.

Sutter's treatment of Native Americans has received renewed criticism from historians and activists. During the George Floyd protests in 2020, the statue of John Sutter outside the Sutter Medical Center in Sacramento, California, was vandalized with red paint. On June 15, 2020, amidst the removal of many monuments associated with racial injustice, the statue was removed by the hospital "out of respect for some community members' viewpoints, and in the interest of public safety for patients and staff". In Sutter's hometown of Lititz, Pennsylvania, General Sutter's Inn removed their statue of John Sutter in solidarity and rebranded in October 2020, dropping 'Sutter' from their name.

== Popular culture ==
=== Scholarly studies ===
- Albert L. Hurtado, John Sutter: A Life on the North American Frontier (2006) University of Oklahoma Press, 416 pp. ISBN 0-8061-3772-X.

=== Films ===
- Days of '49 (1924, serial), with Charles Brinley as Sutter
- California in '49 (1924), with Charles Brinley as Sutter
- The Kaiser of California (1936), with Luis Trenker as Sutter
- Sutter's Gold (1936), with Edward Arnold as Sutter
- Kit Carson (1940), with Edwin Maxwell as Sutter
- "The Pathfinder" (The Great Adventure, 1964), with Carroll O'Connor as Sutter
- Fortune (1969), with Pierre Michael as Sutter
- Donner Pass: The Road to Survival (1978), with Royal Dano as Sutter
- The Chisholms, CBS miniseries, role of Sutter played by Ben Piazza (1980)
- California Gold Rush (1981), with John Dehner as Sutter
- Dream West (1986), with Jerry Orbach as Sutter
- General Sutter (1999), with Hannes Schmidhauser as Sutter

=== Comics ===
- Tex Willer Special #9: La Valle del Terrore (1996) by Claudio Nizzi and Magnus

=== Music ===
- "Sutter's Mill", a song by New Riders of the Purple Sage (1972)
- "Sutter's Mill", a song by Dan Fogelberg (1985)

=== Literature ===
- L'Or, a novel by Blaise Cendrars (1925). A character sketch, it portrays his life as more tragic than it really was.
- Stefan Zweig narrates Sutter's story in one of his Sternstunden der Menschheit (1927) called Die Entdeckung Eldorados ("The Discovery of Eldorado").
- In the children's book Mitch and Amy (1967) by Beverly Cleary, Mitch's class is studying the Gold Rush and Mitch uses toothpicks to create a replica of Sutter's mill.
- Luis Trenker Der Kaiser von Kalifornien, 1961 novelization of his 1936 screenplay, in turn based on L'Or
- "John Sutter", a poem by Yvor Winters (1960)

== See also ==
- Fort Ross, California
