= John Augustus Sutter Jr. =

Swiss-American diplomat. Founder of Sacramento, California

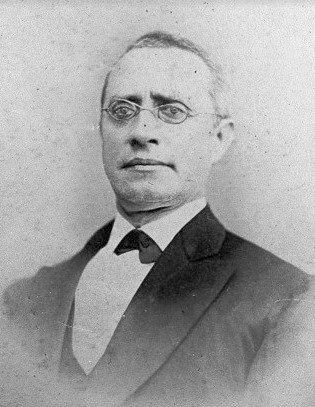
- Born: October 25, 1826; Burgdorf, Switzerland
- Died: September 21, 1897 (aged 70); Acapulco, Guerrero, Mexico
- Resting place: Sacramento Historic City Cemetery
- Occupations: City Planner; U.S. Consul
- Known for: Founding and Planning the City of Sacramento, California
- Spouse(s): María del Carmen Rivas (1850-c.1862); Nicolasa Solís (1870-1897)
- Children: 11
- Parent(s): John Augustus Sutter Sr. Anna Sutter

John Augustus Sutter Jr. (October 25, 1826 – September 21, 1897), known in Spanish as Don Juan Augusto Sutter, was a founder and planner of the City of Sacramento in California, a U.S. Consul in Acapulco, Mexico and the son of noted Californian pioneer John Augustus Sutter Sr.

== Biography ==
John Sutter Jr. was born on Oct. 25, 1826 in Burgdorf, Switzerland. In May 1834, in order to avoid debtors' prison, his father, John Sutter Sr. left his family in Switzerland, departing for the United States. Eventually the elder Sutter settled in California. While in California, initially the father's fortunes had seemed to improve. The son was afterwards raised by his single mother, Anna Sutter, and put through counting school. While the younger Sutter was still a minor living in Europe, Sutter Sr. had decided to transfer to his son, some of his land holdings from the Mexican land grant which he called New Helvetia. Word eventually reached Sutter Jr. that while his father was in California, he had again managed to get himself back into debt. In 1848, with the aim of helping manage his father's business affairs, John Sutter Jr. emigrated to California.

=== Sacramento ===
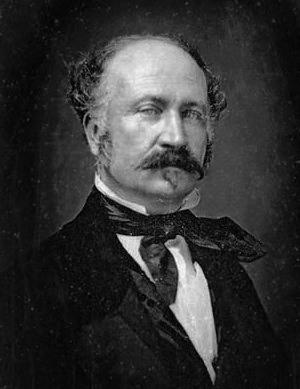
John Augustus Sutter Sr.

When Sutter Jr. arrived at New Helvetia, he found Sutter's Fort to be overrun by loiterers and drunkards, and felt that the situation required improvements in organization and leadership. Soon after his arrival, his father, Sutter Sr., departed for Coloma, California, where gold had recently been discovered, to start a business selling supplies to gold prospectors. Despite the fact that his father had been planning on starting a town to be named Sutterville, Sutter Jr. planned and began to implement his own vision for a city near the fork of the American & Sacramento Rivers. This was the beginning of the City of Sacramento which was then named Sacramento City for real estate promotional purposes.

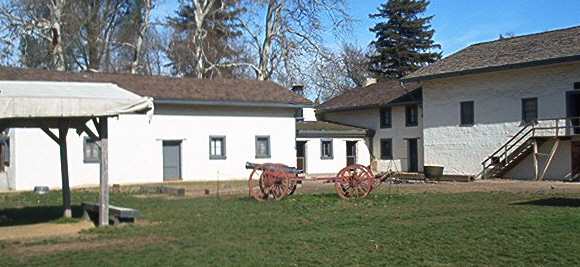
Sutter's Fort in Sacramento, California

The change of plans put a strain on the relationship between father and son. Sutter Jr. became ill and rarely left the family's residence, Hock Farm, on the Feather River. As Sutter Jr.'s illness continued, he grew tired of his responsibilities. He contemplated selling his land, but thought that it would be difficult to sell such a large property. Some businessmen from Sacramento City heard that Sutter Jr. was interested in selling his land. They worked together to buy the land from Sutter Jr., but not by the most honest means. The businessmen, including Sam Brannan, would not bring the contract to purchase the land to Sutter Jr. at Hock Farm, so he took a powerful medicine and met them in Sacramento City to sign the terms of the deal. After reading the contract Sutter Jr. did not like the terms, but the businessmen urged him to sign the contract, get out of California and go somewhere with a climate more suitable to his condition. He reluctantly signed the deal.

=== Acapulco ===
Being rid of the property and the obligation to take care of it, in 1850, Sutter Jr. moved south to find a climate that suited his needs. He made it as far as Acapulco, Mexico. There he met his first wife, María del Carmen Rivas. They were married in the latter part of 1850. Having recovered his health but never any money from his earlier business dealings he returned to California to try and force payment. Brannan waited until Sutter Jr. was desperate then offered him $40,000 as payment in full for what was the final slice of his father's land. Panic stricken young Sutter agreed but even then received no cash, only notes for which he signed receipts for $100,000 of which he also never saw a dime. Brannan's company then buried Sutter Jr. with lawsuits to the point that he gladly received a mere $3,500 after which Sutter Jr. still found himself in debt just over $300. With his nerves and health in shambles again and with nothing left to sell he again ran back to Mexico amid accusations of his squandering his father's fortune. In 1852, his first son, John Sutter III, was born in Northwest Mexico. During this time Sutter Jr. was involved in many court cases over the sale of his property to Brannan and the lack of payment for the property. In some instances, these court cases went all the way to the Supreme Court of California. These court cases did not benefit Sutter Jr. except to release him of the burden of caring for the estate.

In Acapulco, Sutter Jr. worked and was partner in a small general store. When the principal owner died, Sutter took his share of the business. Because the business did so well, the Sutters were able to build a house near the ocean. In 1865, Sutter Jr., on the recommendation of a U.S. Commercial Agent, became the Vice-Commercial Agent for the Port of Acapulco. Because of the ill health of the Commercial Agent, Sutter took his position in 1868. Many of Sutter's friends and business associates in the U.S. and Mexico wrote letters to President Johnson requesting that Sutter be made a U.S. Consul. The United States Department of State granted the requests and opened a full consulate in the District and Port of Acapulco. Sutter was named the U.S. consul by President Grant and U.S. Secretary of State Hamilton Fish on July 13, 1870.

Sometime around 1862, Sutter Jr.'s wife, María, left him. In 1870 Sutter Jr. met Nicolasa Solís and began a relationship with her. This relationship would last until Sutter Jr.'s death. Because he could not properly take care of the divorce from his first marriage, Sutter Jr. and Solís did not marry until 1894. On May 24, 1887, he retired from his post as U.S. Consul to Acapulco. He and his wife lived on their plantation near Acapulco until his death. After his death, his wife had a difficult time keeping their property in Mexico. At this time, there was a revolution in Mexico. The Indians wanted land that they felt originally belonged to them. The revolutionaries targeted many American citizens and made life hard for the Sutters. Much of their property was destroyed. Solís moved, with her children, to San Francisco and for years fought to get back the Mexican land and some of the land in Sacramento that she felt belonged to her and her children, but to no avail.

=== Death ===
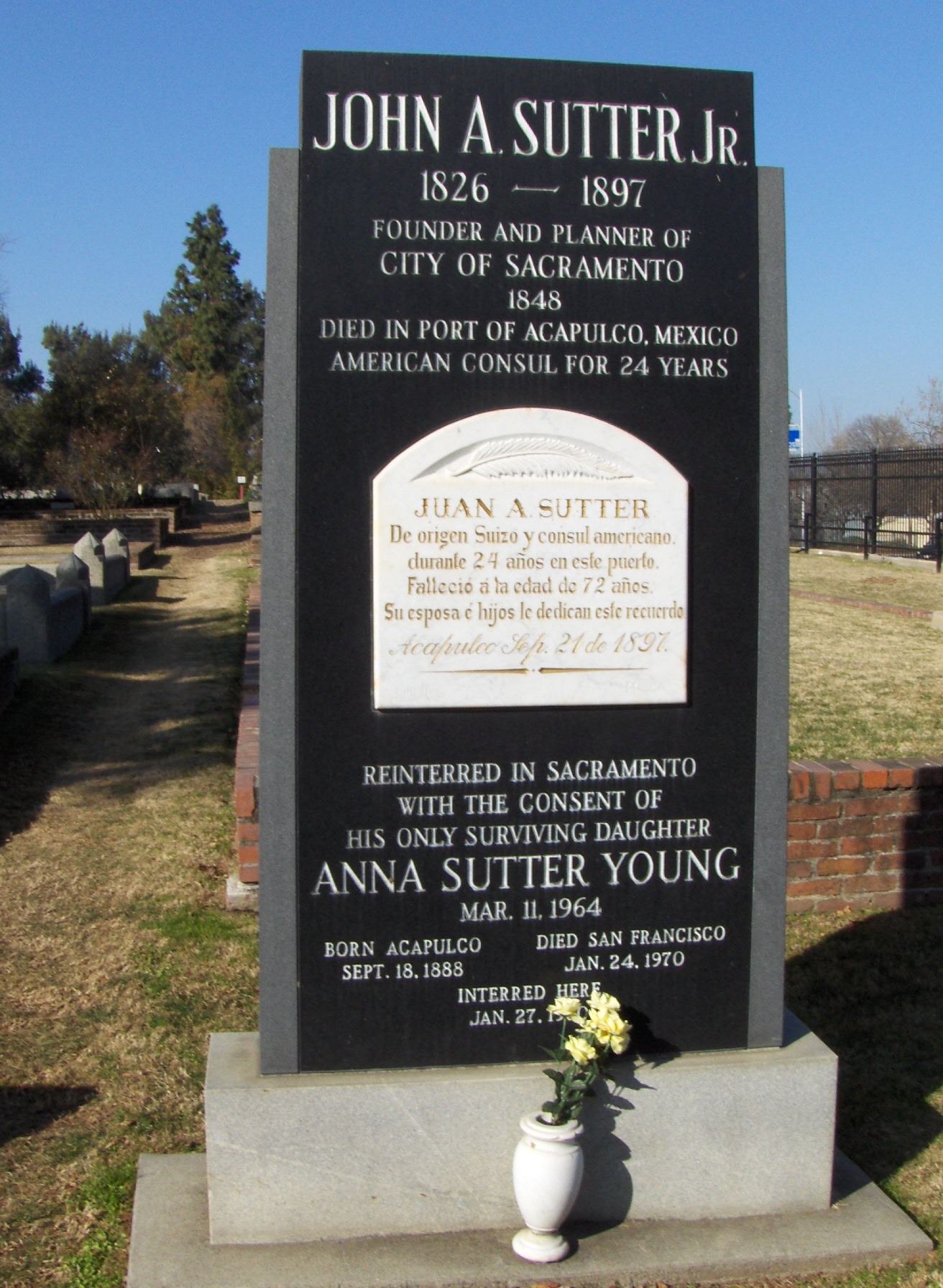
Grave of John A. Sutter Jr.

Sutter Jr. died in Acapulco, Mexico on September 21, 1897. He was originally interred in Acapulco, but was reinterred in the Sacramento Historic City Cemetery in Sacramento, California at the request of his daughter, Anna Sutter Young.
