= Sutter Hock Farm =

Company based in the state of California, United States

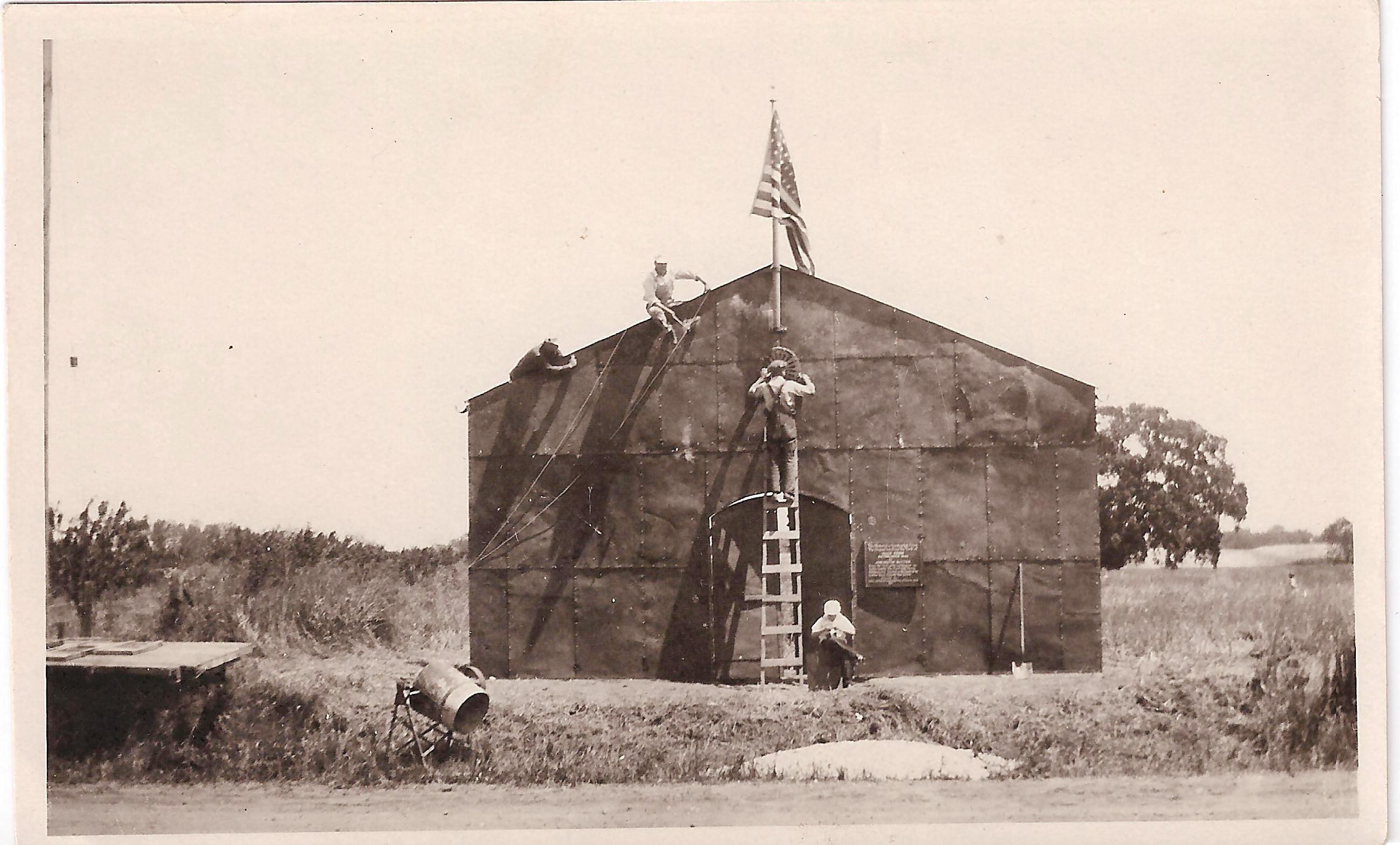
- Local Yuba-Sutter residents restoring the Sutter Hock Farm facade in 1927
- Location: 5320 Garden Hwy, Yuba City, California
- Coordinates: 39°2′56″N 121°38′0″W
- Founded: 1841

California Historical Landmark
- Official name: Hock Farm (Site of)
- Designated: August 8, 1939
- Reference no.: 346

The Sutter Hock Farm is the first non-Indian settlement in Sutter County, USA established in 1841 by John Augustus Sutter. John Sutter's Hock Farm was the first large-scale agricultural settlement in Northern California, composed of grain, cattle, orchards and vineyards. Located on the Feather River, Hock Farm was intended by Sutter to be a retirement location where he would relocate his wife and children. By 1864–65 Sutter could no longer maintain the farm as the California Gold Rush had depleted the area of manpower and Sutter could no longer hire workers due to his dwindling financial situation, squatters looting his beloved property of its cattle and timber and his own son, August Sutter, losing vast amounts of property holdings to swindlers as well as Capt. Sutter's own failed business dealings with swindlers and thieves that left him nearly penniless. The Mansion located on Hock Farm was destroyed by an arson fire on June 21, 1865, deliberately set by a vagrant ex-soldier, whom Sutter allowed to loaf around the farm, who retaliated against Sutter for having him bound and whipped after being caught stealing. The blaze destroyed all of Sutter's personal records of his pioneer life as well as works of art and priceless relics except for a few treasured medals and portraits that Sutter was able to save. Despite the vast land holdings given him by the Mexican government Sutter ultimately lost Hock Farm as well due to the enormous cost of litigation trying to perfect his land titles in the now United States courts. Sutter left Hock Farm and California completely five months after the fire and went to Washington DC to petition congress for redress, where he died in a Pennsylvania hotel room in 1880.

== See also ==
- Sutter's Mill
