= List of historic properties in Yuma, Arizona =

- City
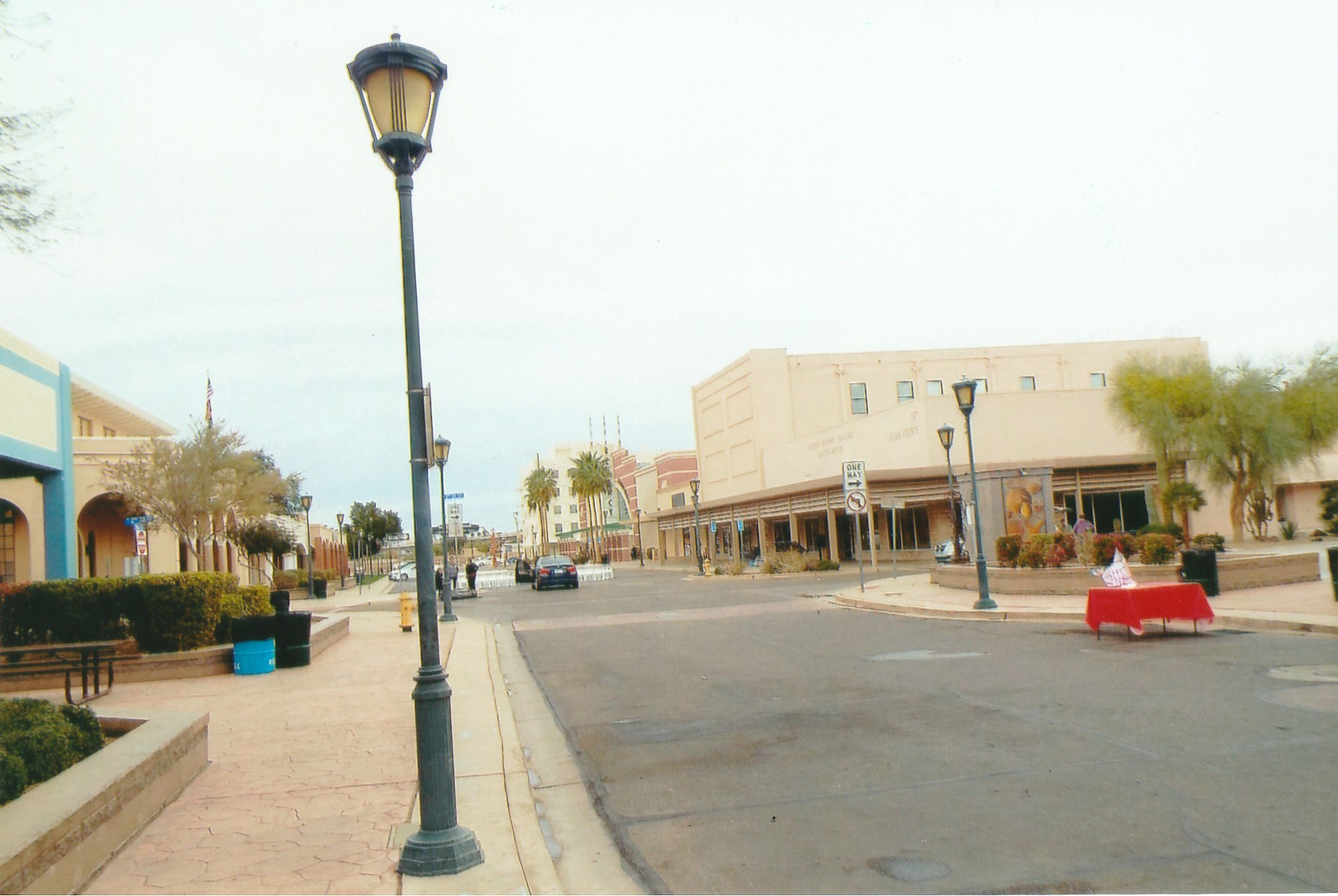
- Historic Downtown Main Street

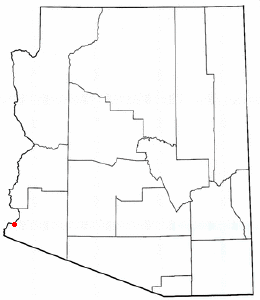
- Location of Yuma in Yuma County, Arizona.
- Coordinates: 32°41′32″N 114°36′55″W

This is a list of historic properties in Yuma, Arizona, which includes a photographic gallery of some of the remaining historic structures and monuments. Yuma is the county seat of Yuma County, Arizona, United States. It is located in the southwestern corner of the state. Yuma is the site of one of the few National Historic Landmarks in the Southwest. Included in this list are photographs of some of the structures within the Yuma Downtown Historic District, the Yuma Quartermaster Depot, which today is a state historic park and the Yuma Territorial Prison a Yuma landmark.

== Brief history ==
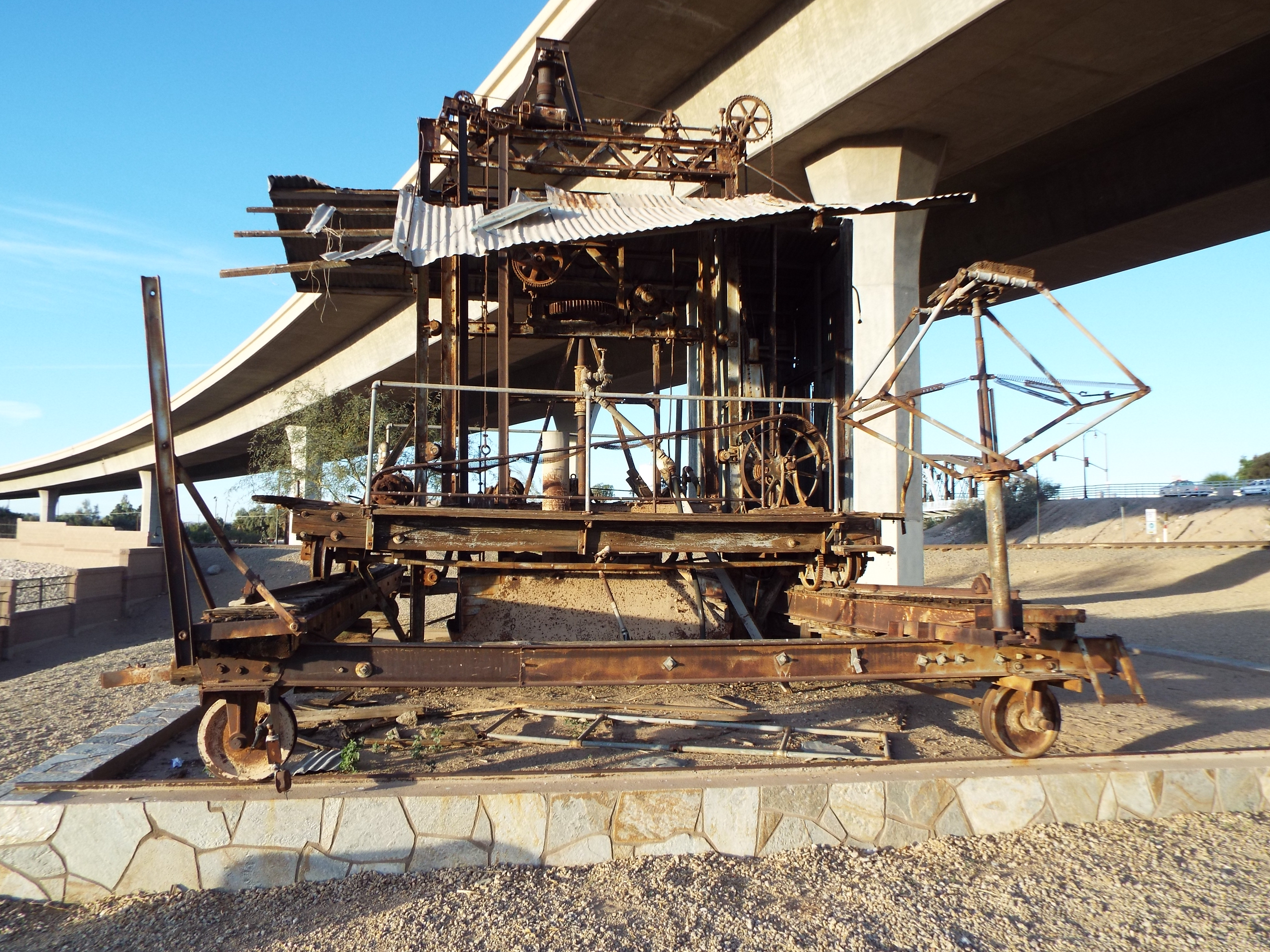
The 1902 Blaisdell Slow Sand Filter Washing Machine

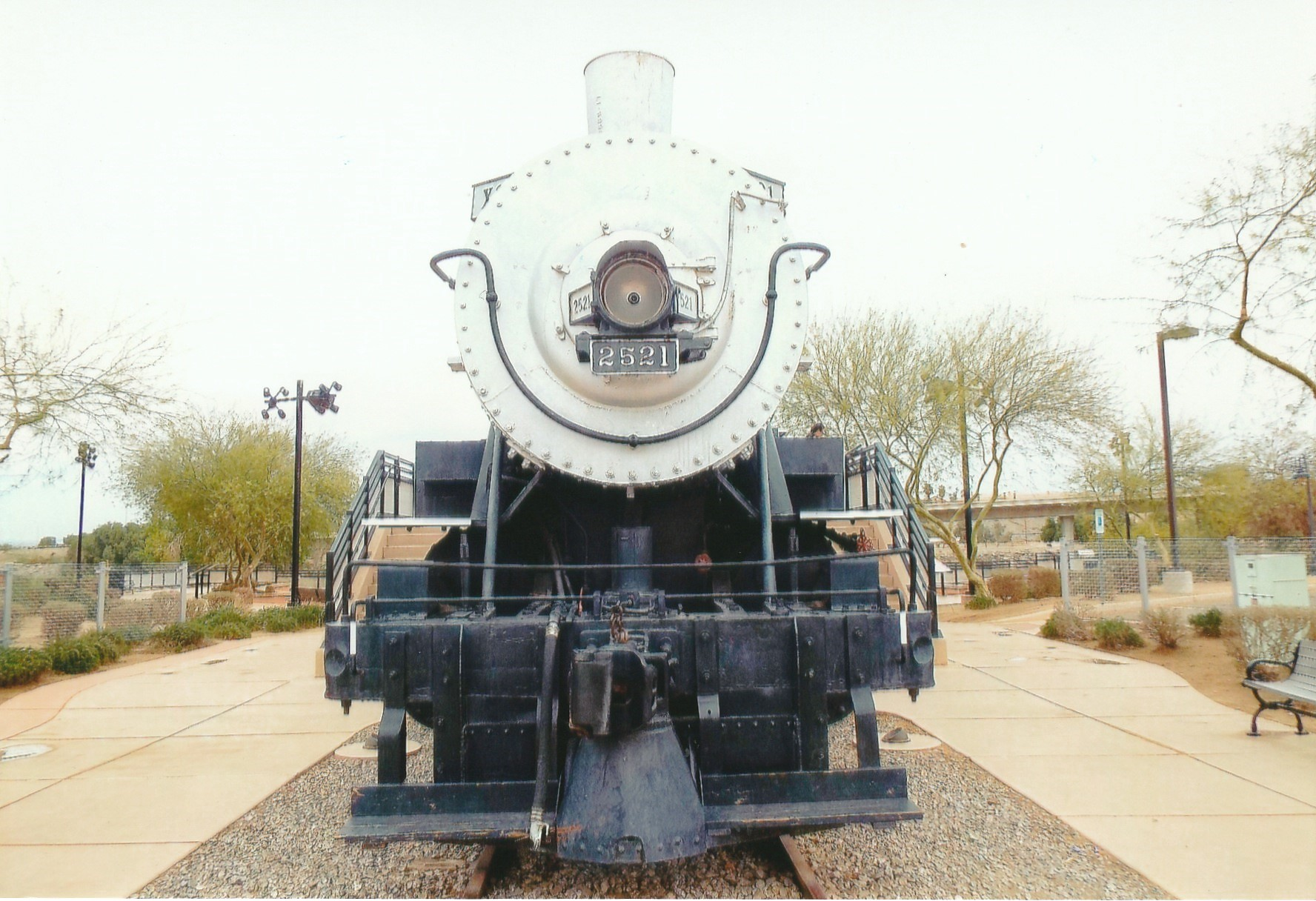
1907-Southern Pacific Railroad Locomotive X2521

The area where the city of Yuma is located was once occupied by the Yuma tribe, also known as the Quechan. Hernando de Alarcón and Melchior Diaz were Spanish Conquistadors who in 1540 visited the area during the Spanish colonial expeditions. They believed that the narrow crossing of the Colorado River would be ideal for the establishment of a city.

At first the relations between the Yuman and the Spaniards was cordial, however the relation between the two became hostile and the Yuman were forced to submit to the rule of the Spanish government and most were enslaved.

In 1853, Yuma ceased to be part of Mexico and became a United States Territory (New Mexico Territory) as a result of Gadsden Purchase. The United States established Fort Yuma and an influx of settlers and farmers of European descent invaded the area. The Yuma Crossing was ideal during and after the California Gold Rush to the late 1870s. It was known for its ferry crossings for the Southern Emigrant Trail.

The Yuma tribe fiercely resisted the invasion of their homelands and fought against the US in the Yuma War (1850–1853). They were defeated and were forced to move to Indian Reservations such as the one in western Yuma County in what eventually become the State of Arizona.

In 1853, Arizona City, a small settlement was established on the high grounds across Fort Yuma. The settlement continued to grow and the government established the Yuma Quartermaster Depot. From 1864, the Yuma Quartermaster Depot, today a state historic park, supplied all forts in present-day Arizona, as well as large parts of Colorado and New Mexico. After Arizona became a separate territory, Yuma became the county seat for Yuma County in 1871, replacing La Paz County, the first seat. Arizona City was renamed Yuma in 1873.

== Yuma County Historical Society ==
The mission of the Yuma County Historical Society is to preserve the structures of historic significance in the city and county of Yuma. To this end the society has teamed up with the Arizona Historical Society. They collaborated in restoration of the E. F. Sanguinetti (1867–1945) House located at 240 S. Madison Ave. It serves as the home to the Arizona Historical Society museum. Among the plans of the society is the restoration of the historic adobe Molina Block, Yuma's first commercial building.

== Historic properties ==
=== Historic Districts ===
The following three districts are considered historical by the National Register of Historic Places:

- The Brinley Avenue Historic District – bounded by 29–96 W. 2nd St., 198–200 S. Main, 201 S. 1st, and 102–298 Madison Aves. Listed in the National Register of Historic Places on March 10, 1994, reference #94000068. Pictured is the historic Yuma Theater located at 254 S. Main Street which was built in 1911.
- The Yuma Century Heights Conservancy Residential Historic District – roughly bounded by 4th Ave., 8th St., and 1st and Orange Aves. Listed in the National Register of Historic Places on November 10, 1988.
- The Yuma Main Street Historic District – bounded by 170–387 S. Main St. and 10–29 W. 3rd St. Listed in the National Register of Historic Places on December 7, 1982, reference #82001625. Pictured is the historic Kress Building located at 284 S. Main Street which was built in 1926.
Historic Districts

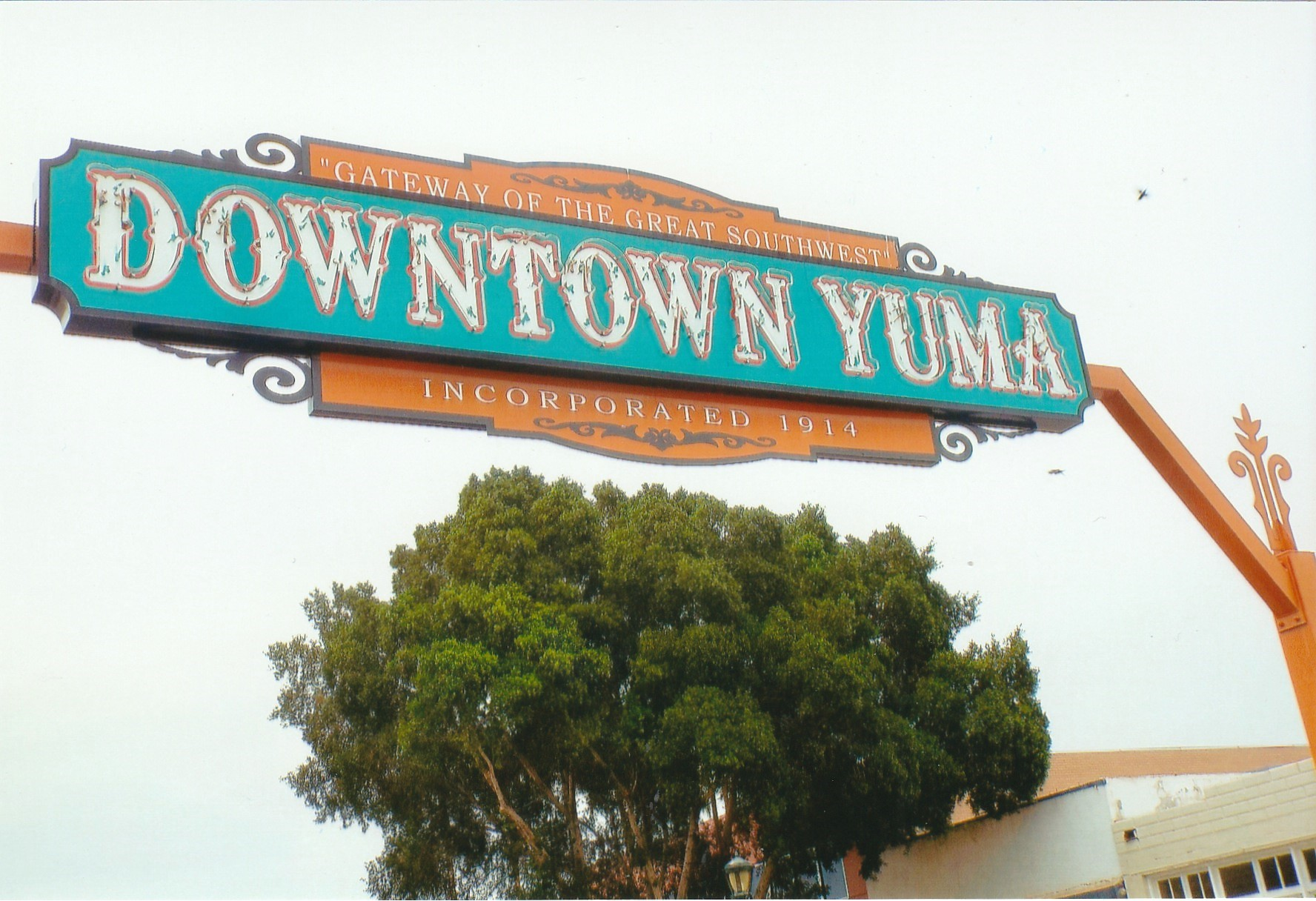
Welcome to the Downtown Main Street Historic District

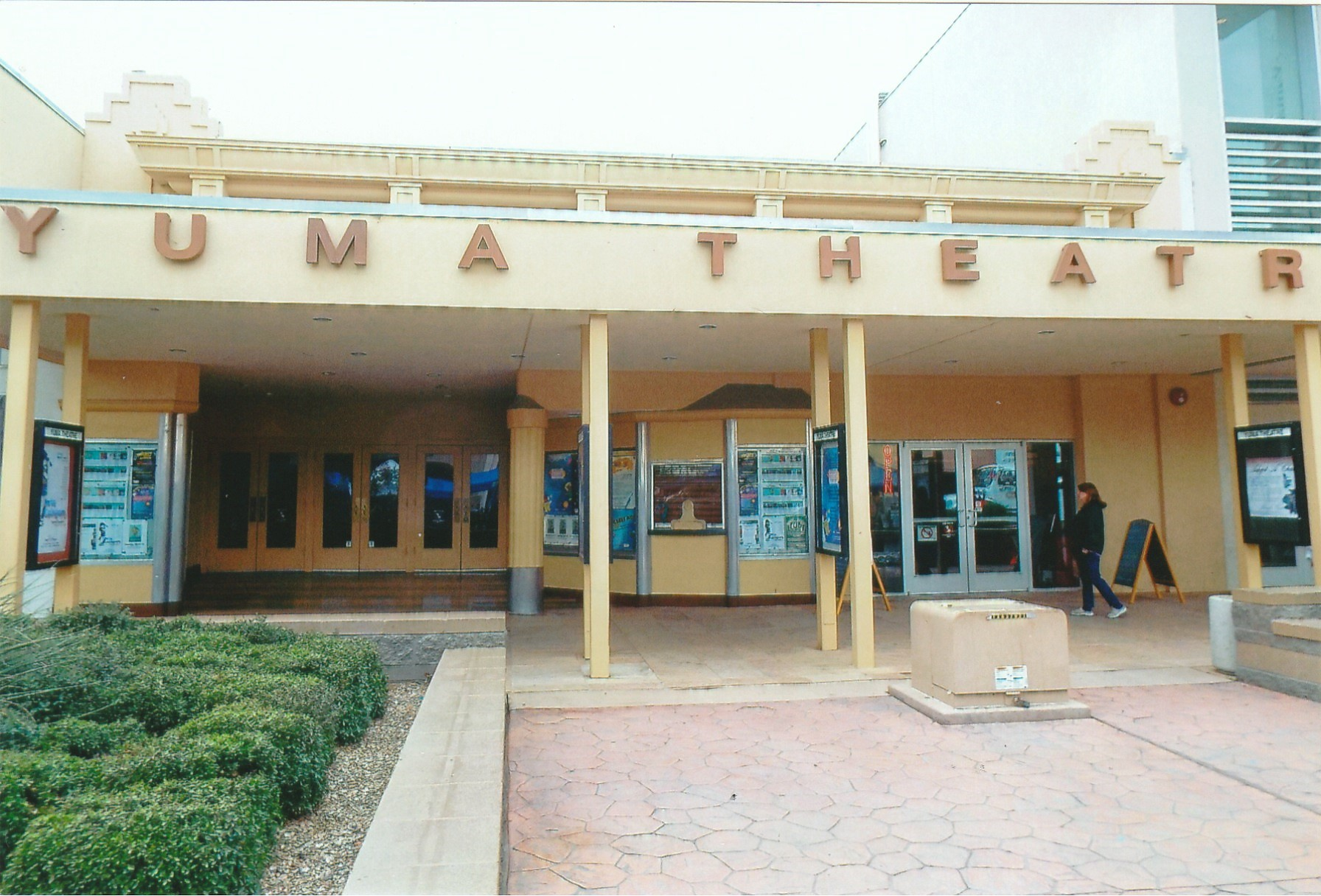
Yuma Theater – 1911

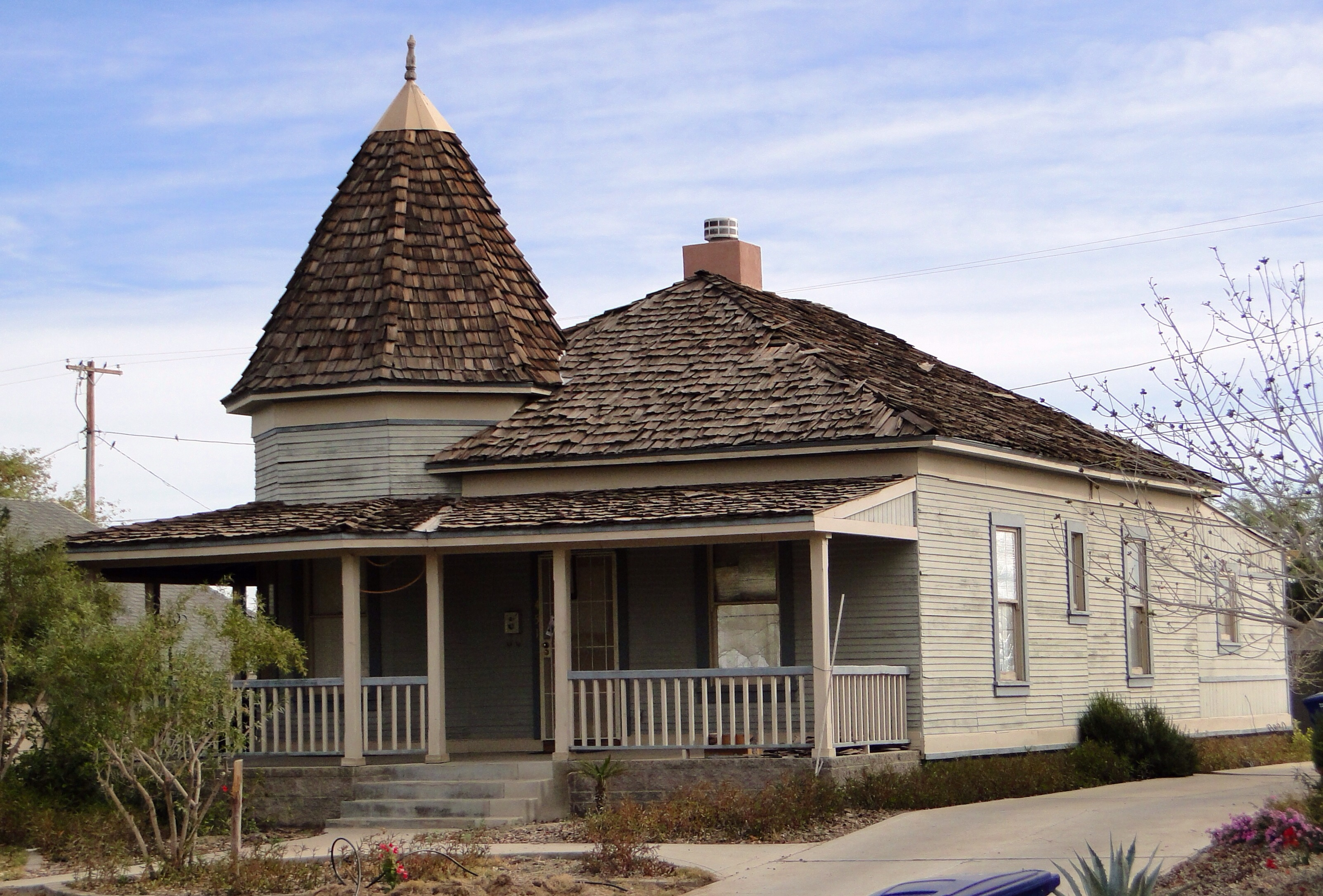
Century Heights Historic District

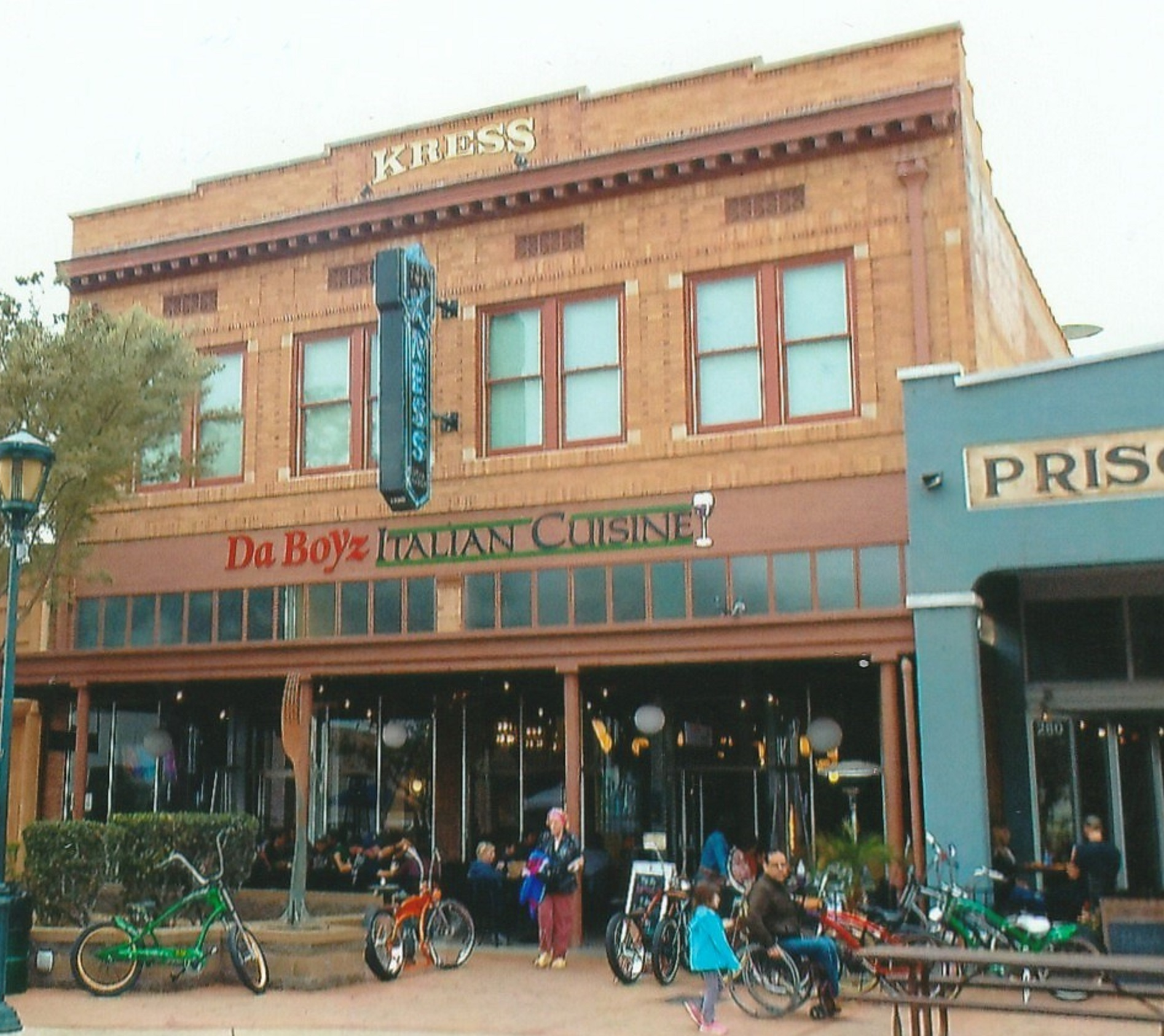
Kress Building – 1926

=== Bridge ===
- The Ocean-to-Ocean Bridge – was built in 1914 and was listed in the National Register of Historic Places on September 11, 1979, reference # 79000431. It was the first highway crossing of the Colorado River. Its name derives from the fact that it was a critical link in one of the nation's first transcontinental highways.
- Also pictured is the Southern Pacific Railroad Bridge which was built in 1923.
Ocean to Ocean Bridge

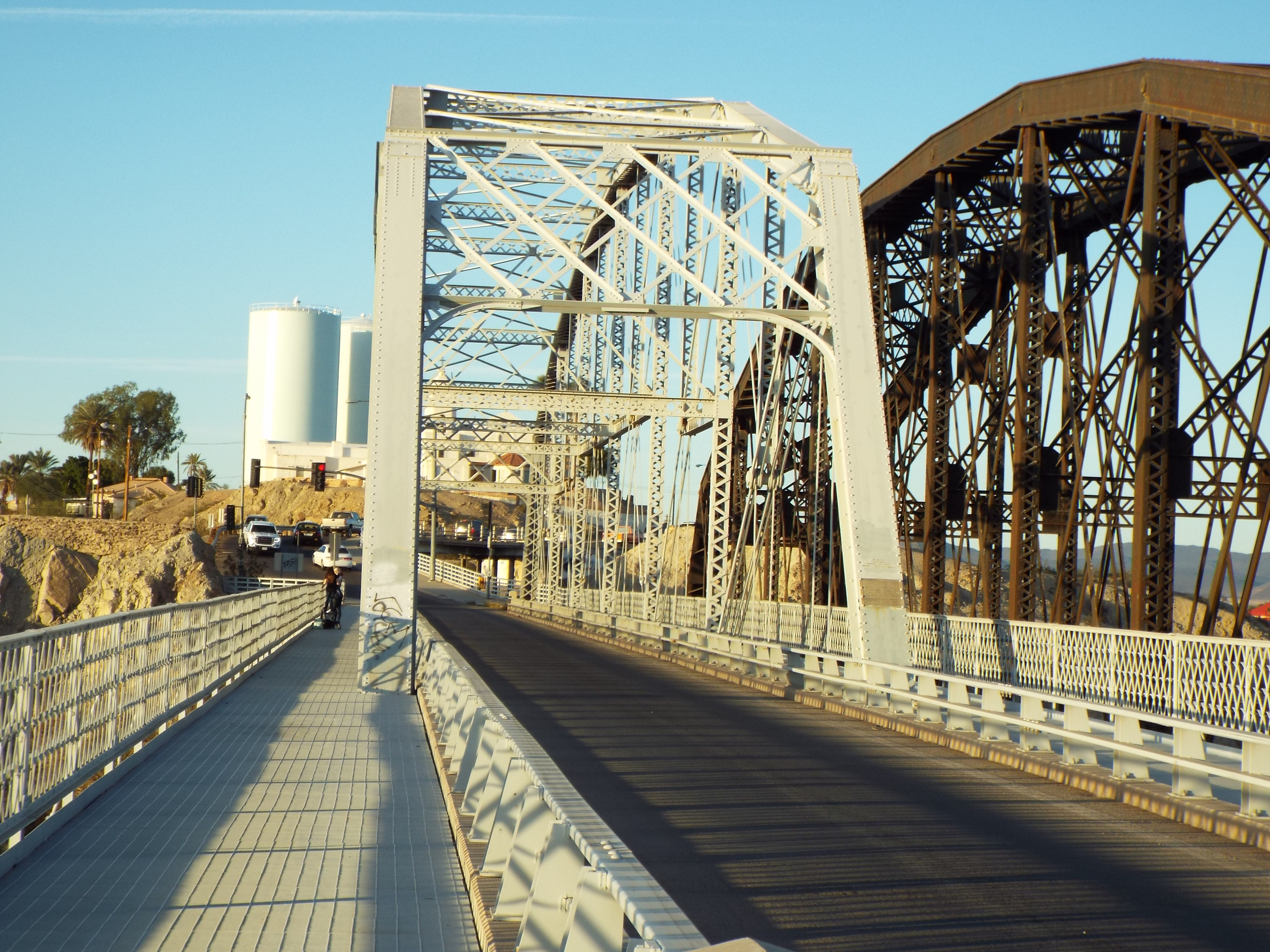
Ocean-to-Ocean Bridge

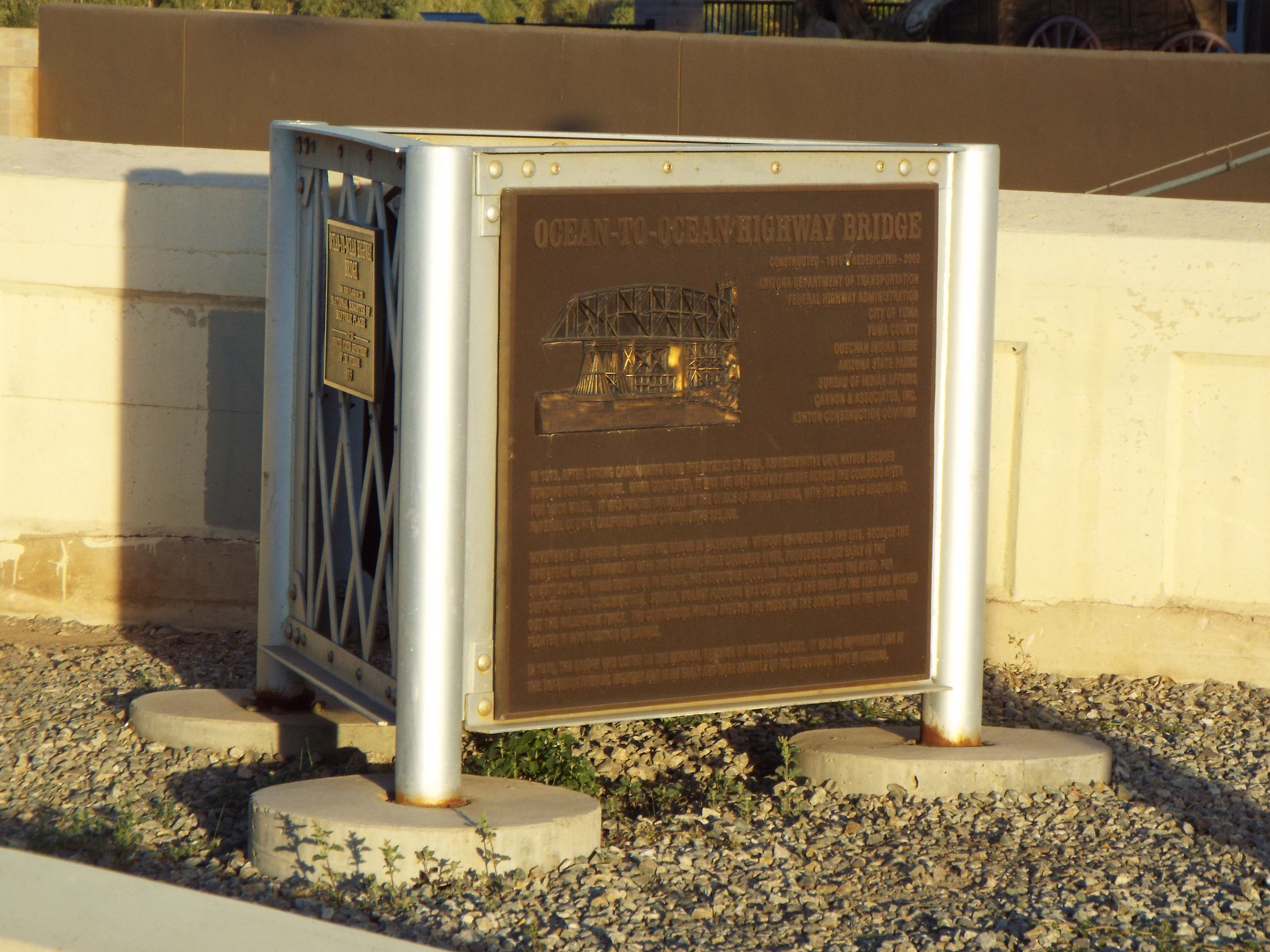
2002 Ocean to Ocean Bridge re-dedication

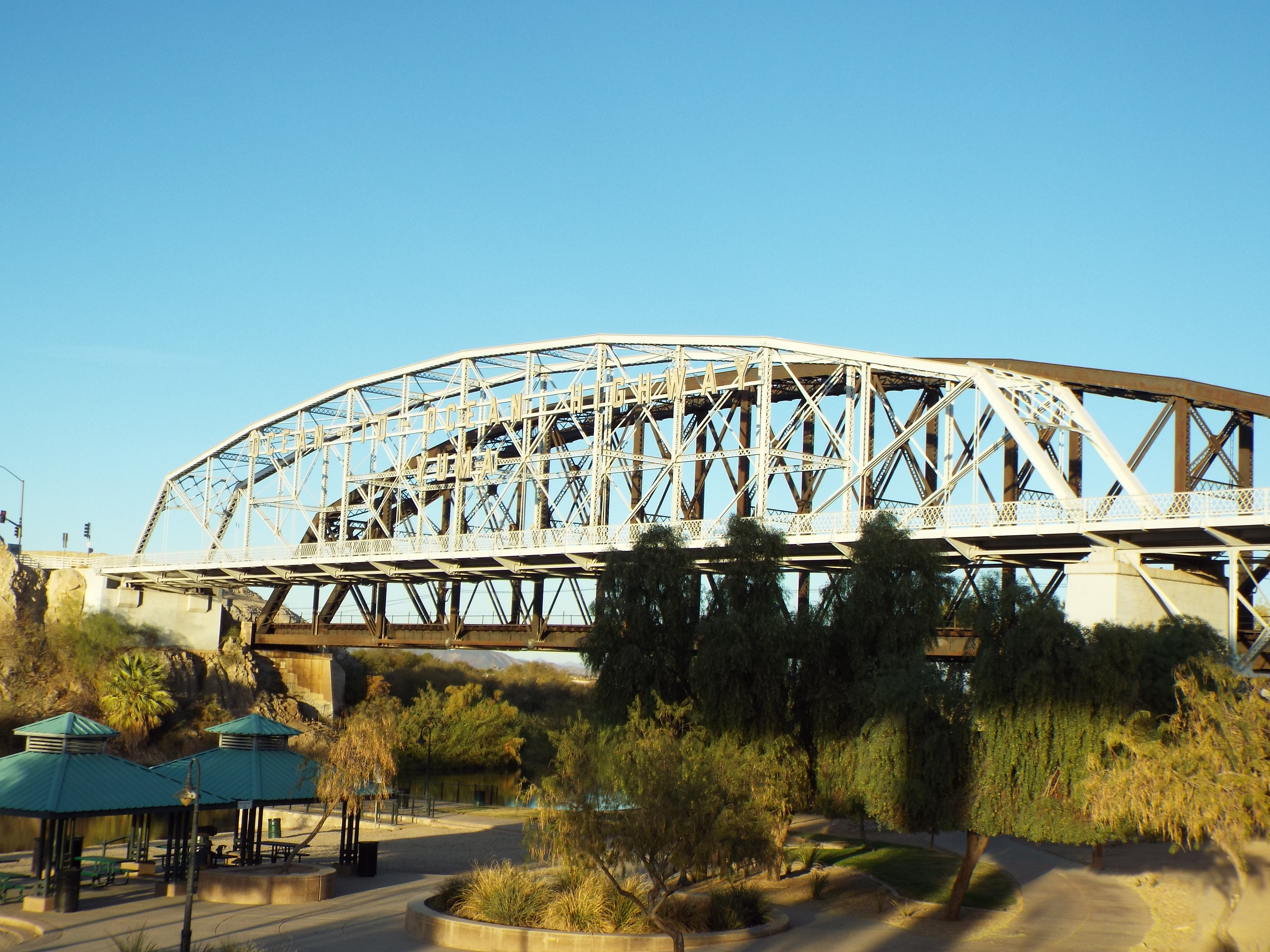
Different view of the Ocean to Ocean Bridge – 1914.

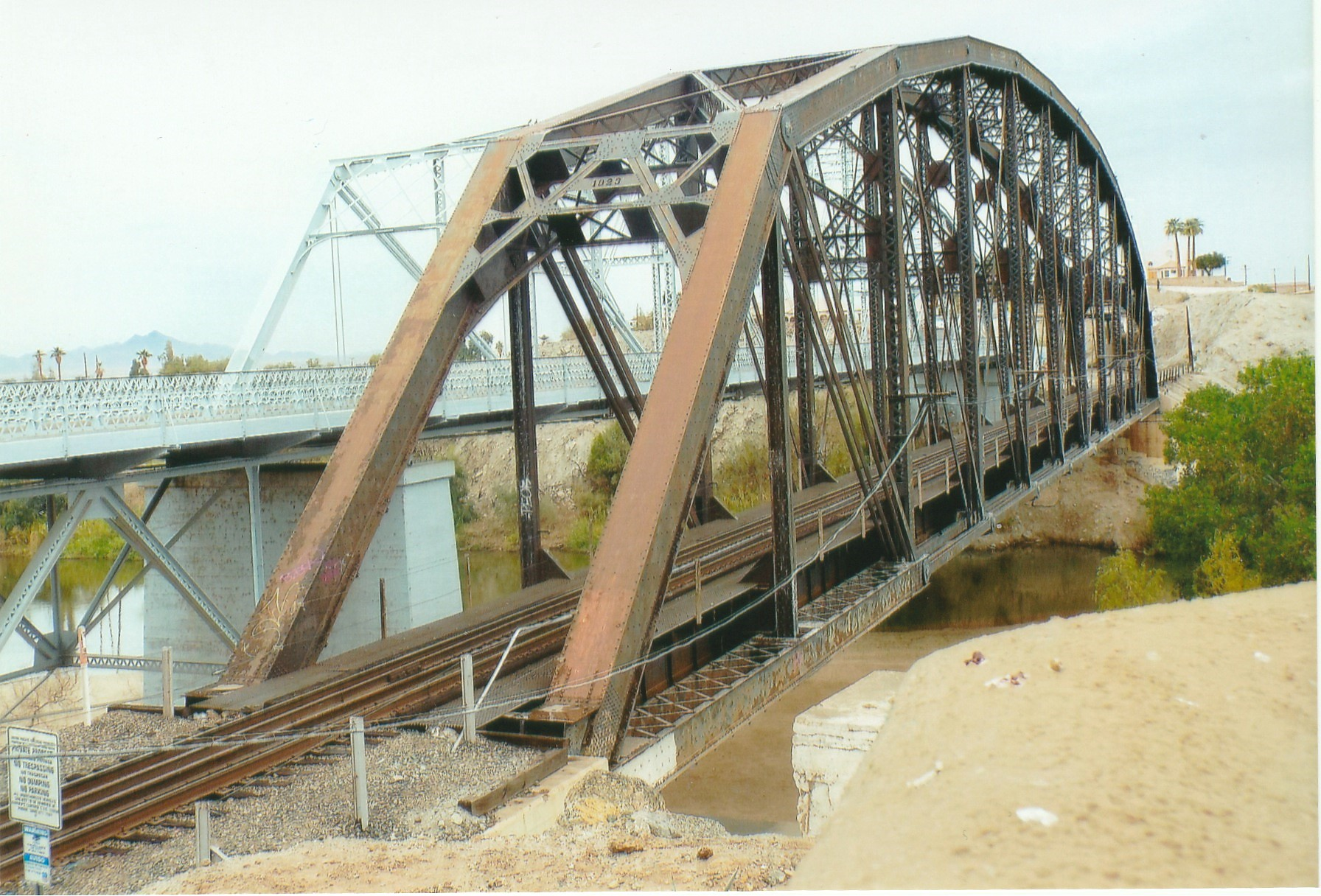
The Southern Pacific Railroad Bridge – 1923.

=== Buildings ===
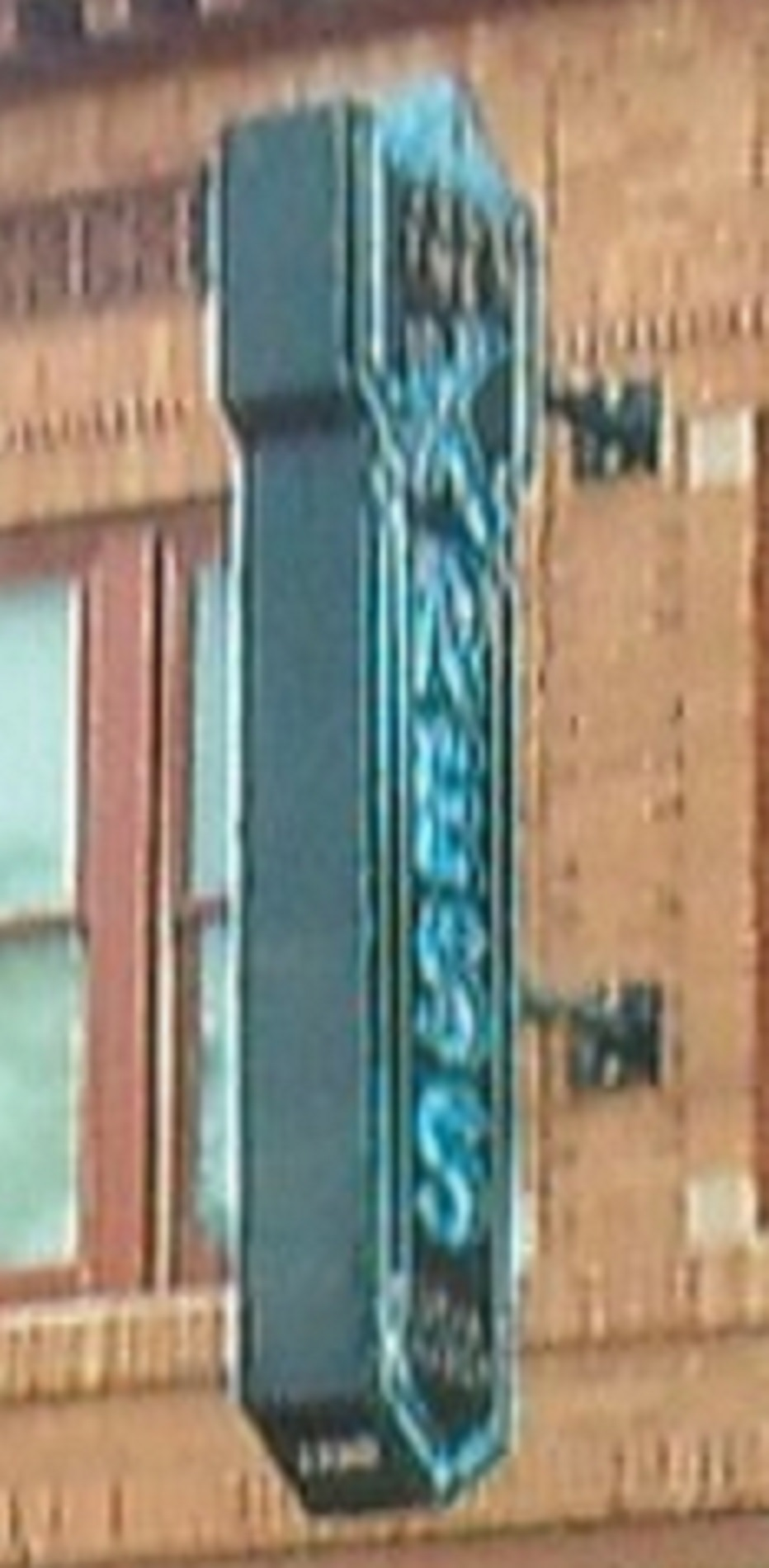
1926 Kress Building sign

The following is a brief description with the images of the historic buildings in Yuma.

- Cactus Press-Plaza Paint Building and roof fixture – built in 1925 and located at 30–54 E. 3rd St. Listed in the NRHP on April 24, 1987.
- The Dressing Apartments – located at 146 1st. Ave. was built in 1915–17 and listed in the National Register of Historic Places on December 7, 1982, reference #82001630.
- Gandolfo Theater – located at 200 1st Ave. was built in 1917 and listed in the National Register of Historic Places on December 7, 1982, reference #82001636.
- Fredley Apartments – located at 406 2nd Ave. Listed in the NRHP on December 12, 1982.
- Power Apartments – built in 1900 and located at 20 W. 3rd St. It was listed in the National Register of Historic Places on December 7, 1982, ref. #82001653.
- Hotel del Ming (Sol) – located at 300 Gila Street was built in 1926 and listed in the National Register of Historic Places on December 7, 1982, reference # 82001639. In the 1990s this building was used in the crime chase movie "The Getaway" starring Alec Baldwin and Kim Basinger.
- Lee Hotel – located at 390 Main Street was built in 1917 and listed in the National Register of Historic Places on April 12, 1984, reference #84000750.
- Masonic Temple – located at 153 2nd Ave. was built in 1931 April and listed in the National Register of Historic Places on il 12, 1984, reference #84000752.
- Pauley Apartments – located at 490 West. 1st Street was built in 1926 and listed in the National Register of Historic Places on December 7, 1982, reference #82001652.
- San Carlos Hotel – located at 106 1st. Street was built in 1930 and listed in the National Register of Historic Places on April 12, 1984, reference # 84000754.
- Stoffela Store – located at 447 Main Street was built in 1899 and listed in the National Register of Historic Places on December 7, 1982, reference #82001659
- U.S. Post Office/Yuma Main – located at 370 Main Street was built in 1922 and listed in the National Register of Historic Places on December 3, 1985, reference #85003109.
- Yuma City Hall – located at 181 1st. Street was built in 1921 and listed in the National Register of Historic Places on December 7, 1982, reference #82001660.Yuma County Courthouse 168 S. 2nd Ave. 1982-12-07
- Yuma County Court House – located at 168 2nd Ave. was built in 1928 and listed in the National Register of Historic Places on December 7, 1982, reference #82001661.
- Southern Pacific Freight Depot – located at 430 Main Street was built in 1891 and listed in the National Register of Historic Places on April 24, 1987, reference #87000614.
- Southern Pacific Railroad Depot – located on Gila St. Listed in the NRHP on June 22, 1976.
- Molina Block – built in 1870 and located at 272 Madison Ave. The Molina Block, was constructed as a business building for E. F. Sanguinetti.
- Drake Hotel – built in 1922 and located at 29–30 W. 2nd St.
Buildings

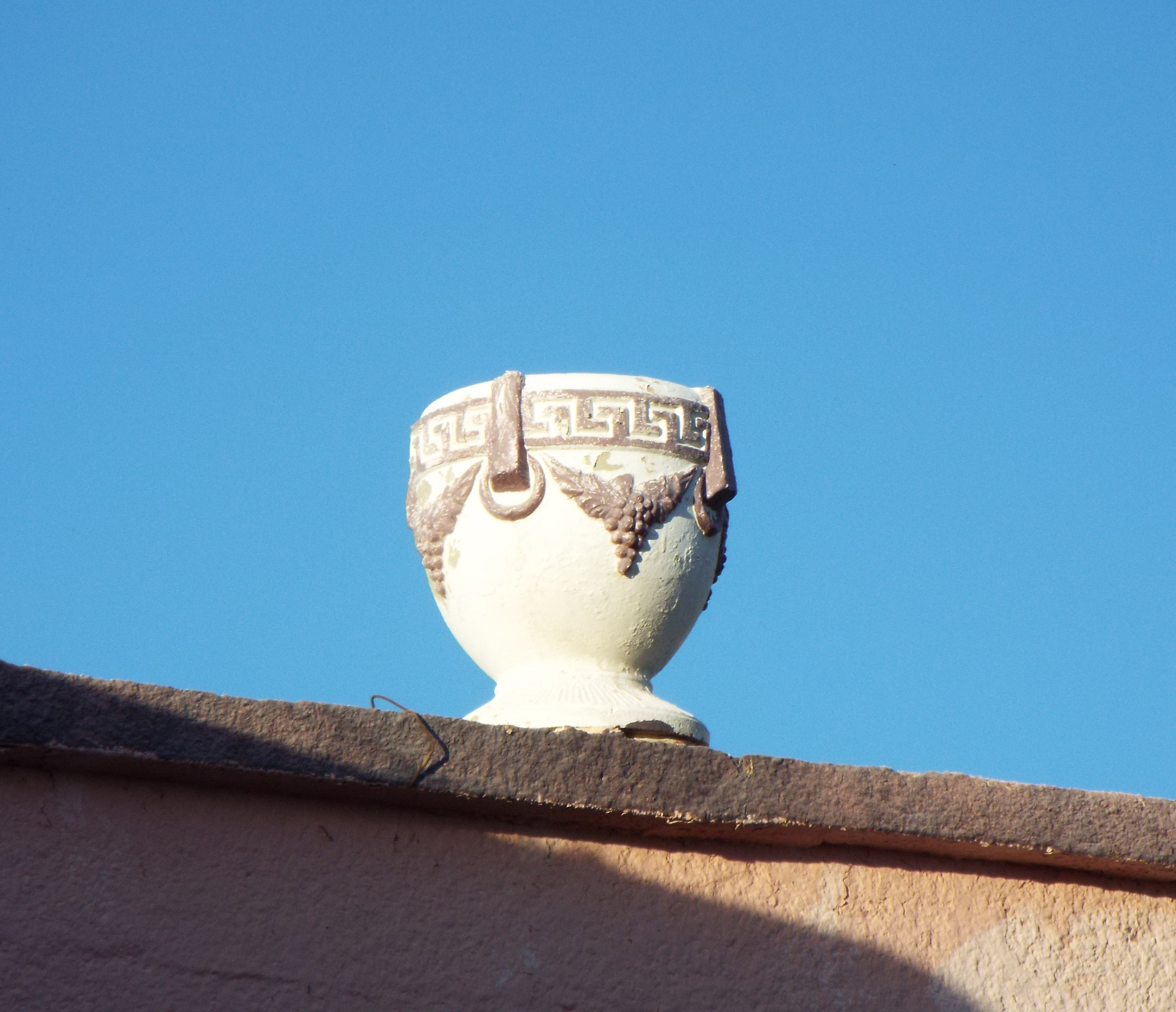
Cactus Press Plaza Paint Building roof fixture

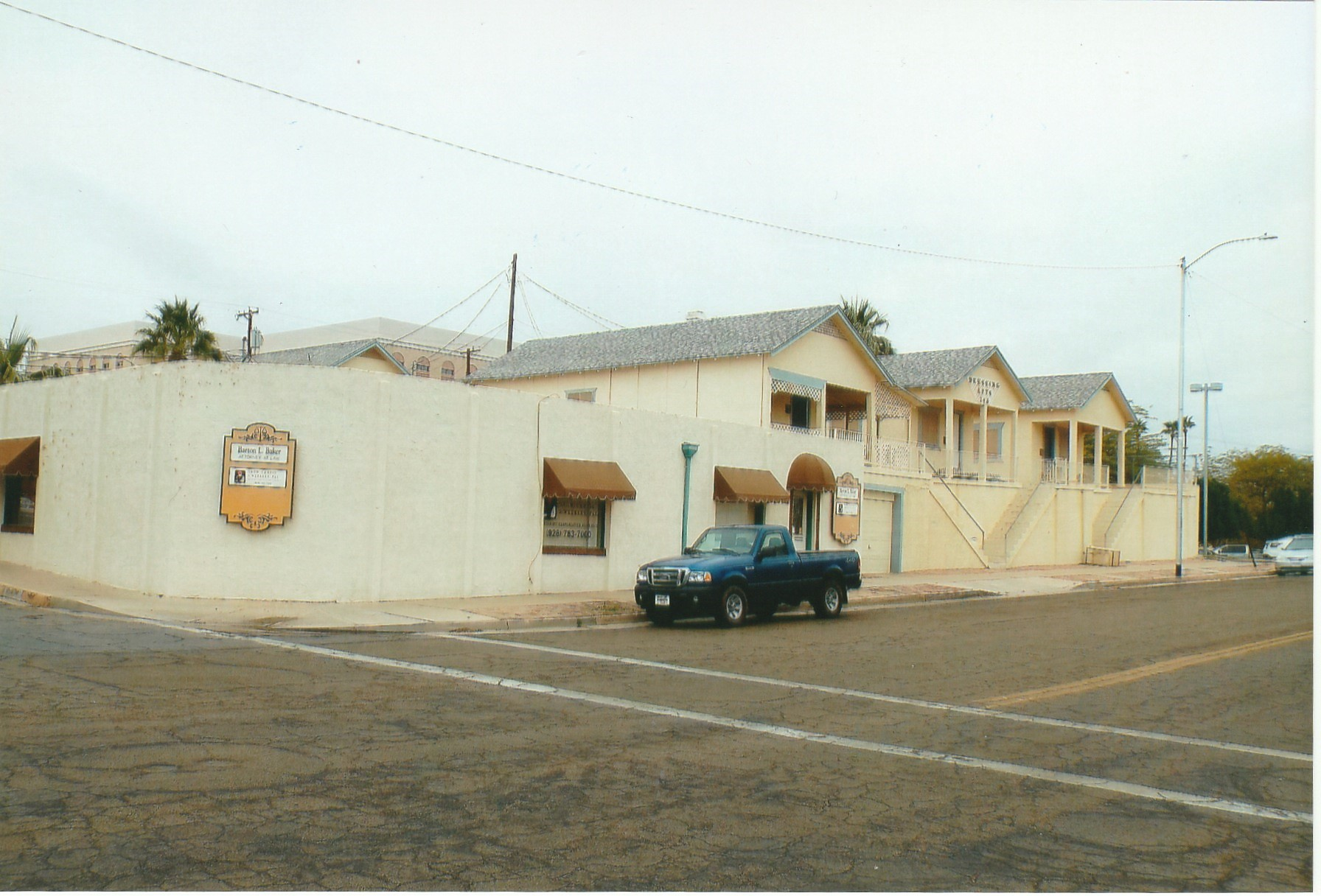
Dressing Apartments – 1915

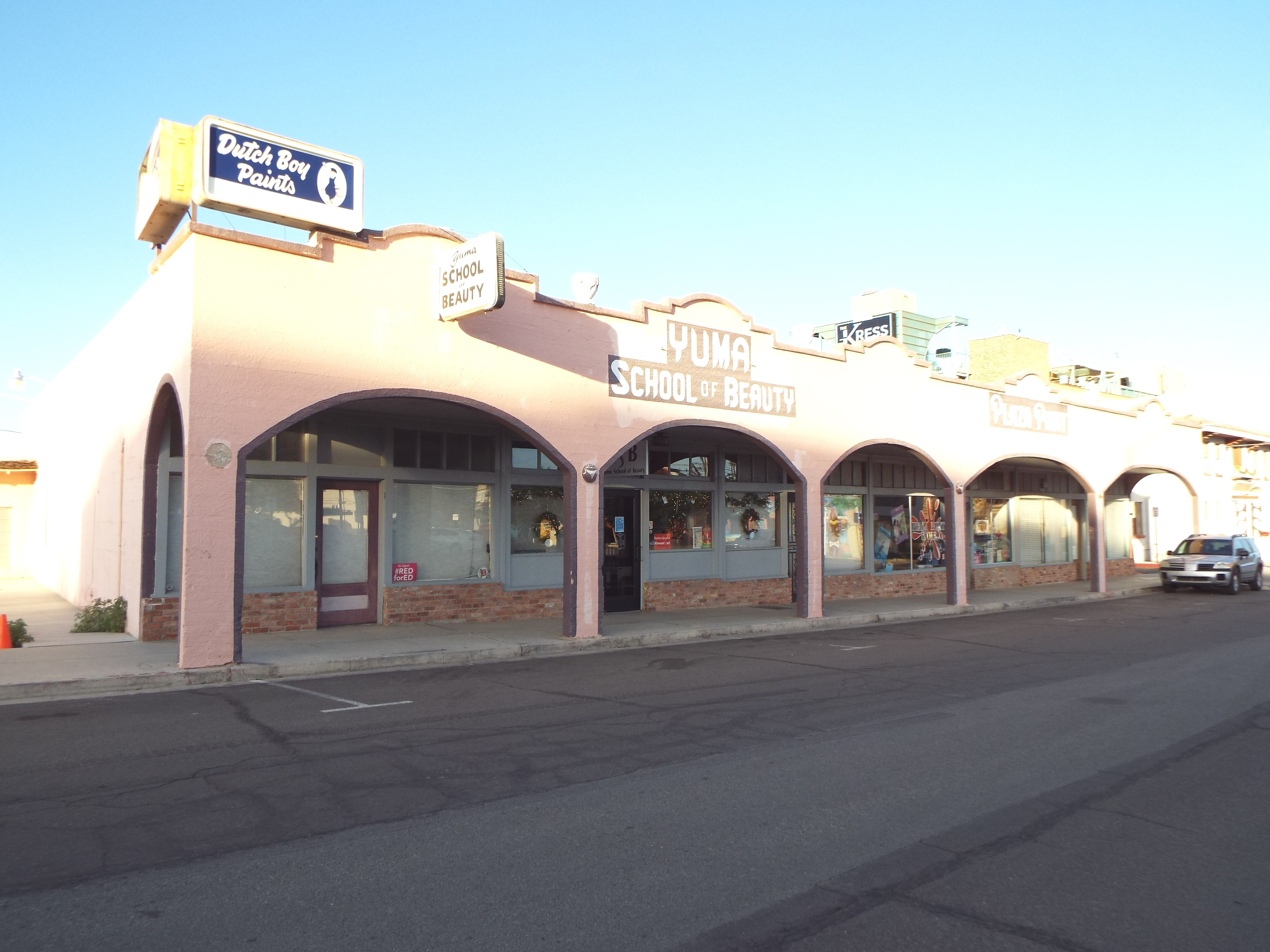
Cactus Press Plaza Paint Building – 1925

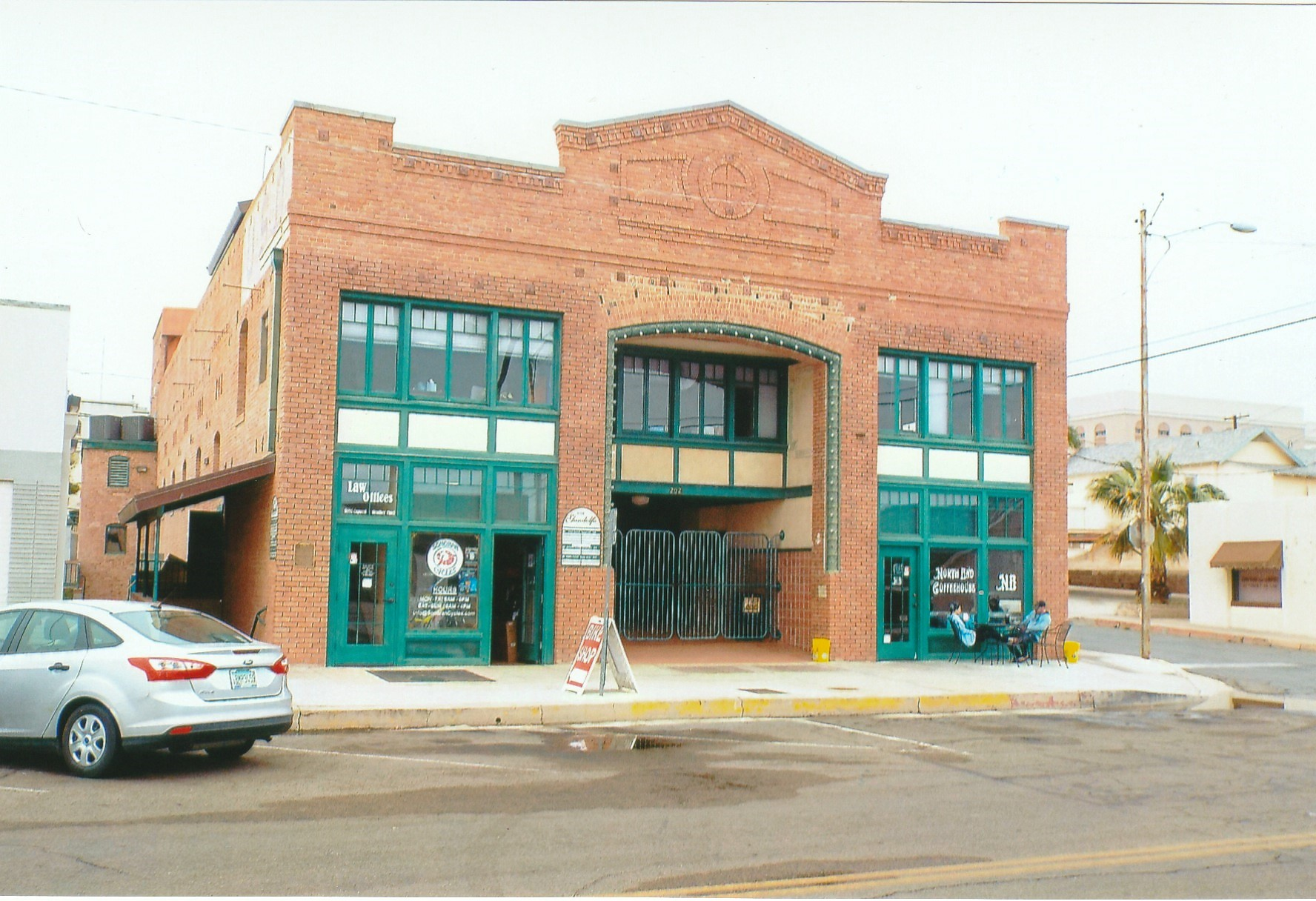
Gandolfo Theater – 1917

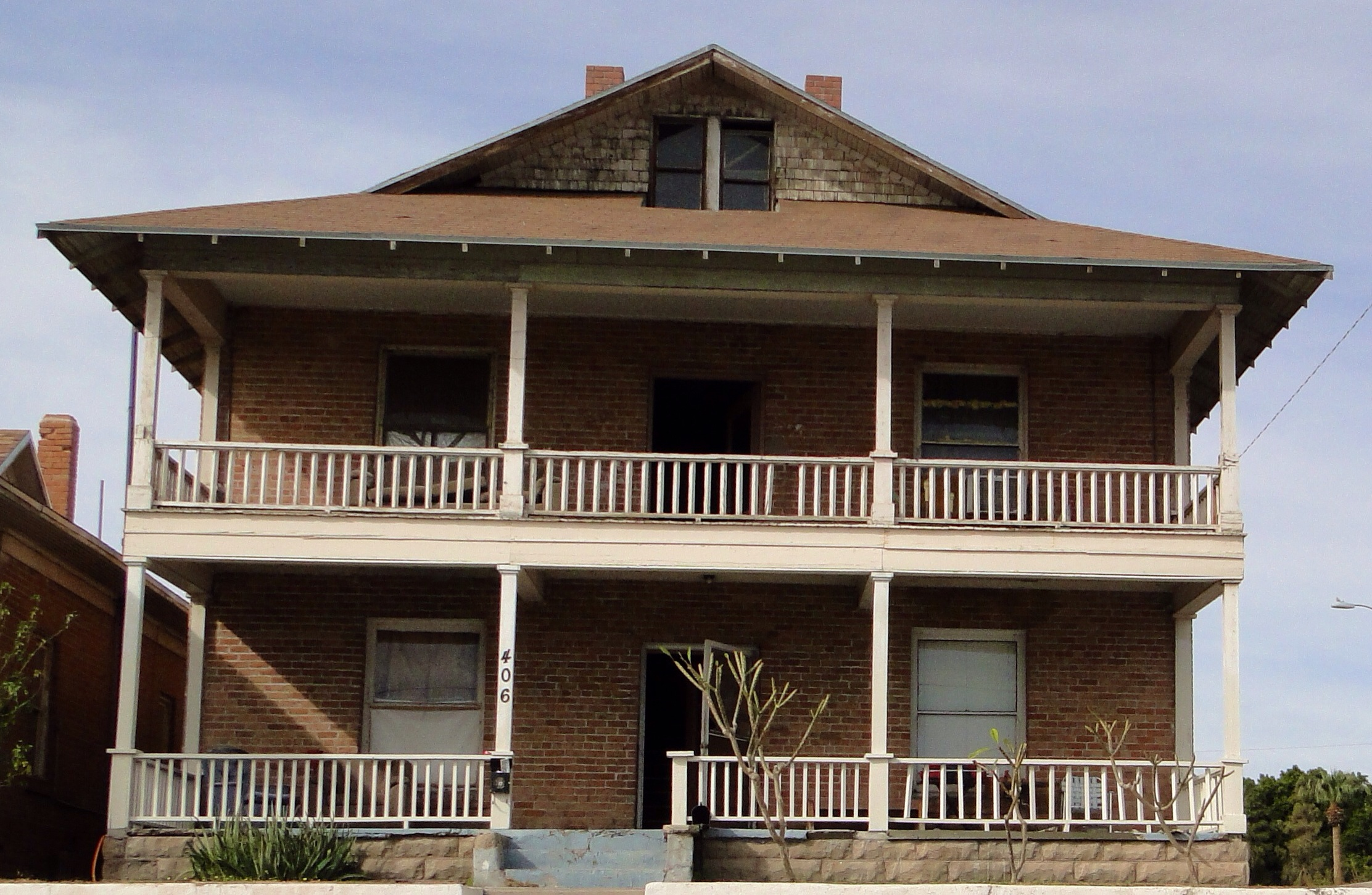
Fredley Apartments – 1900 (demolished)

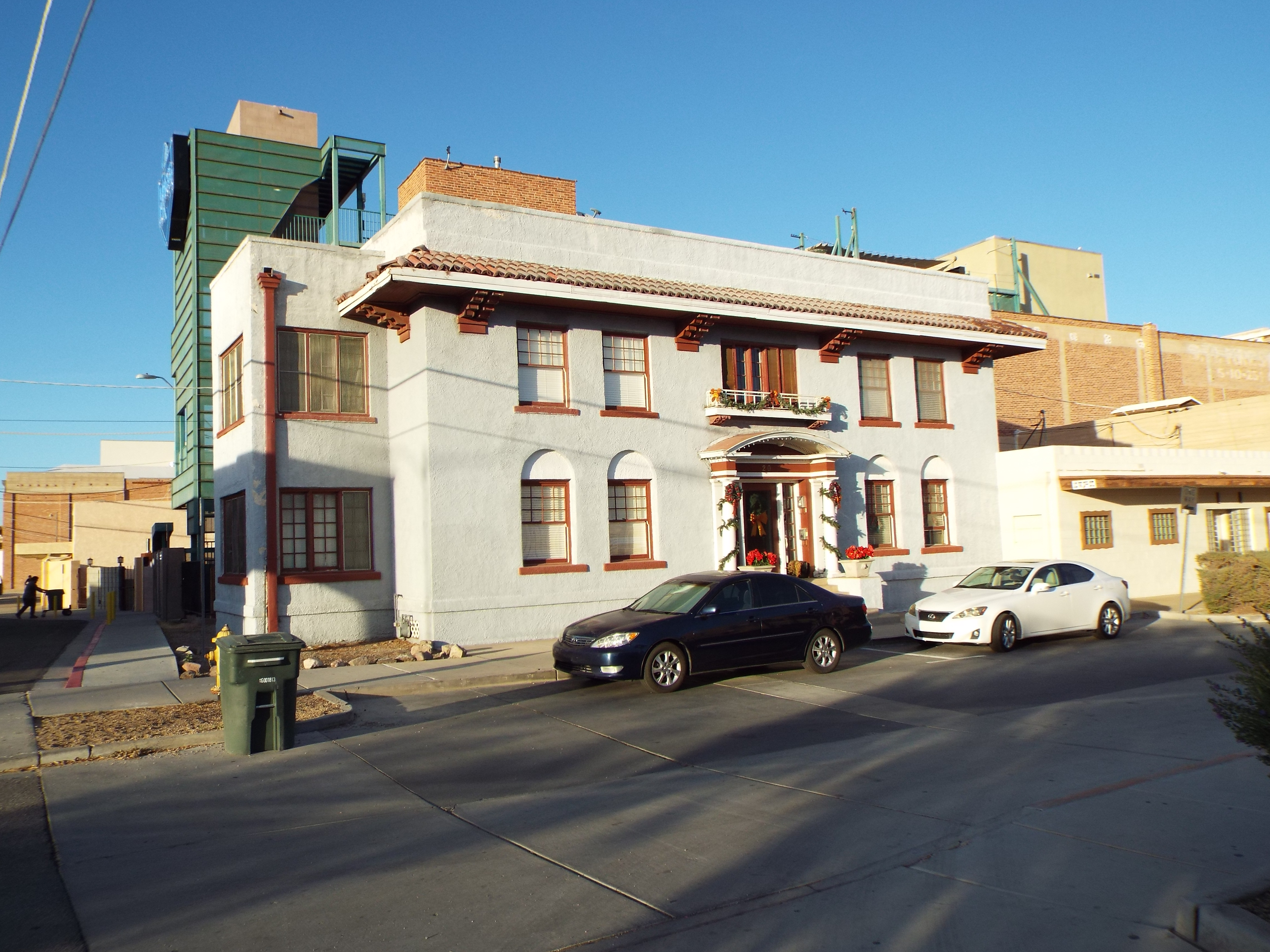
Power Apartments – 1900

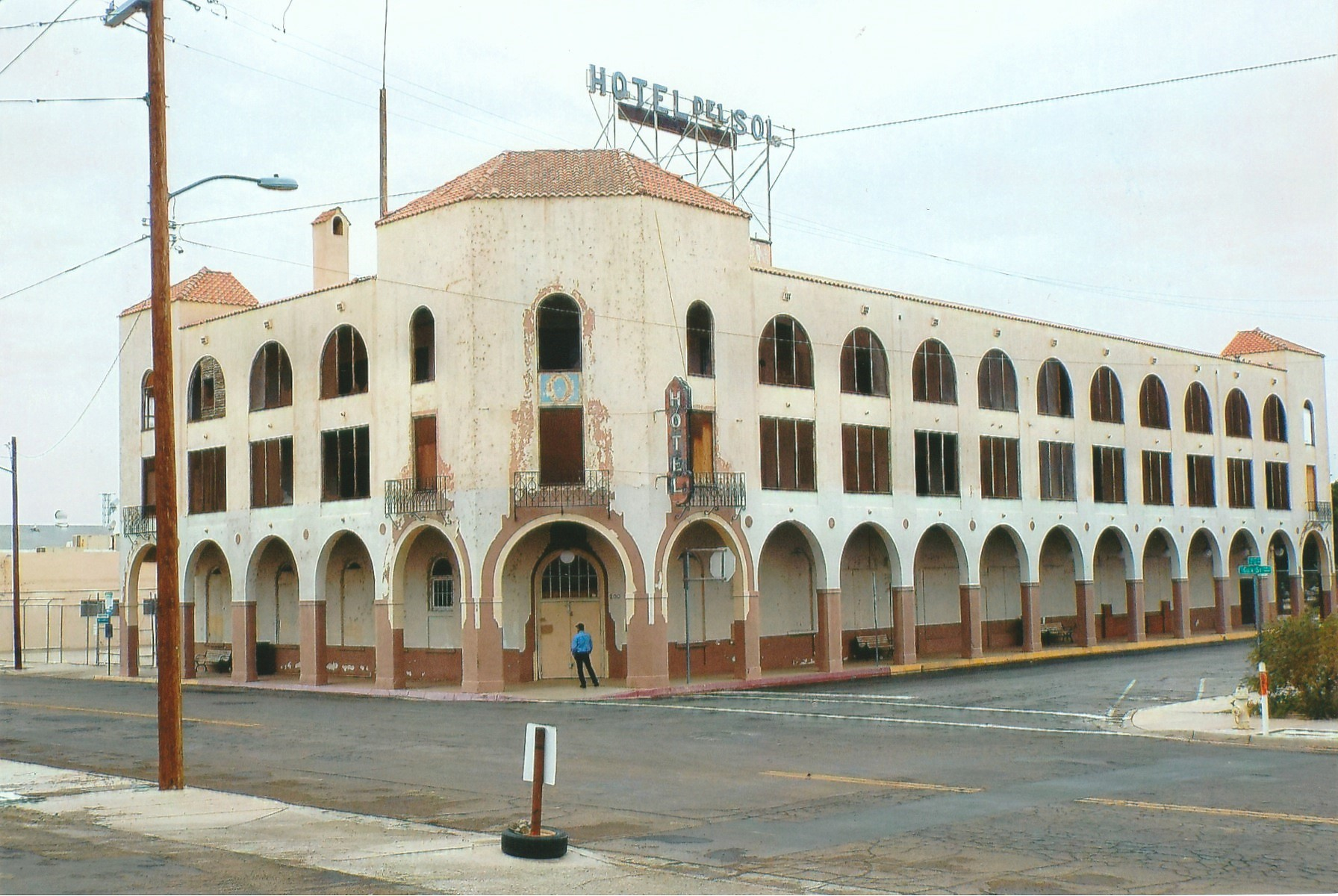
Hotel del Ming (Sol) – 1926

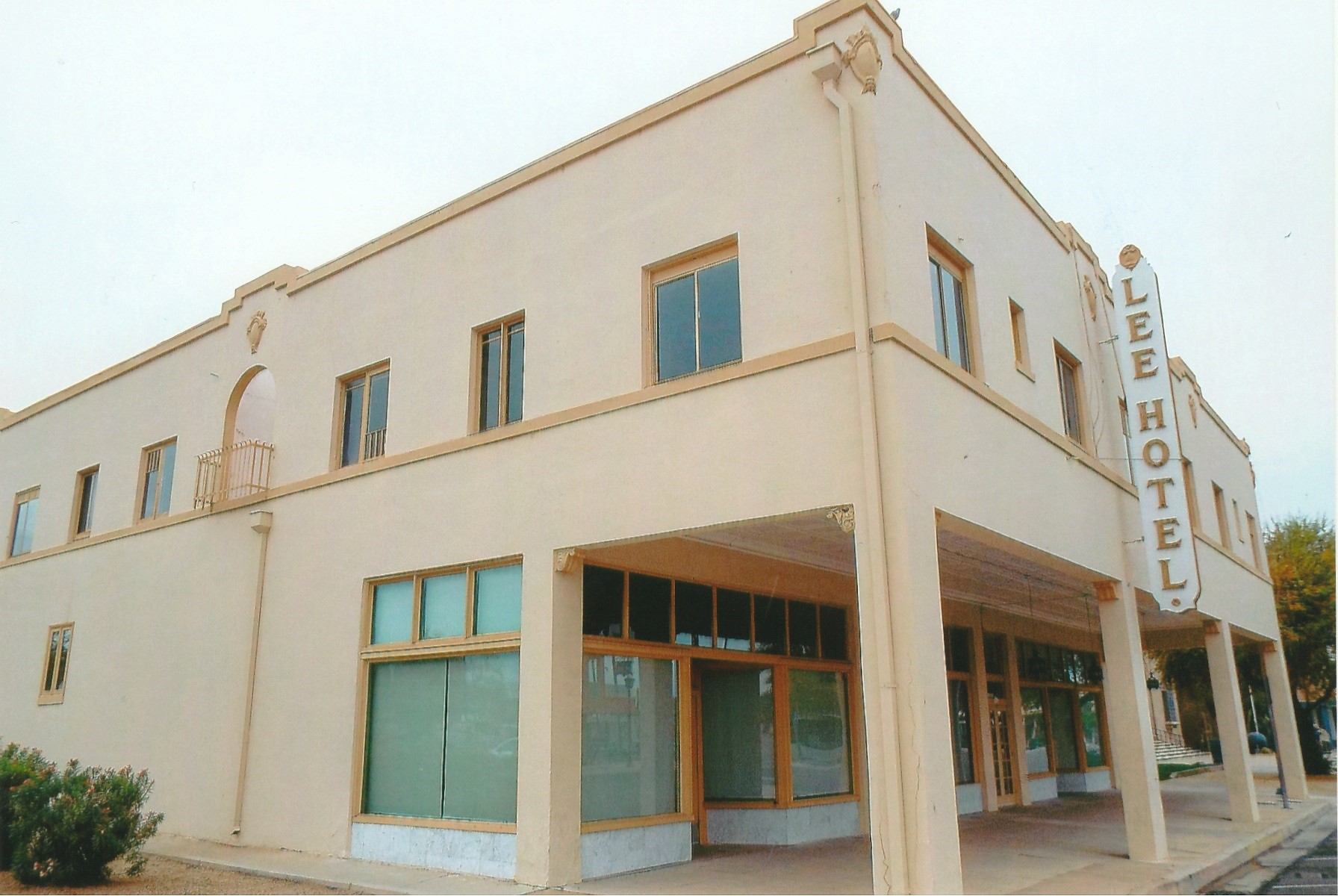
Lee Hotel – 1917

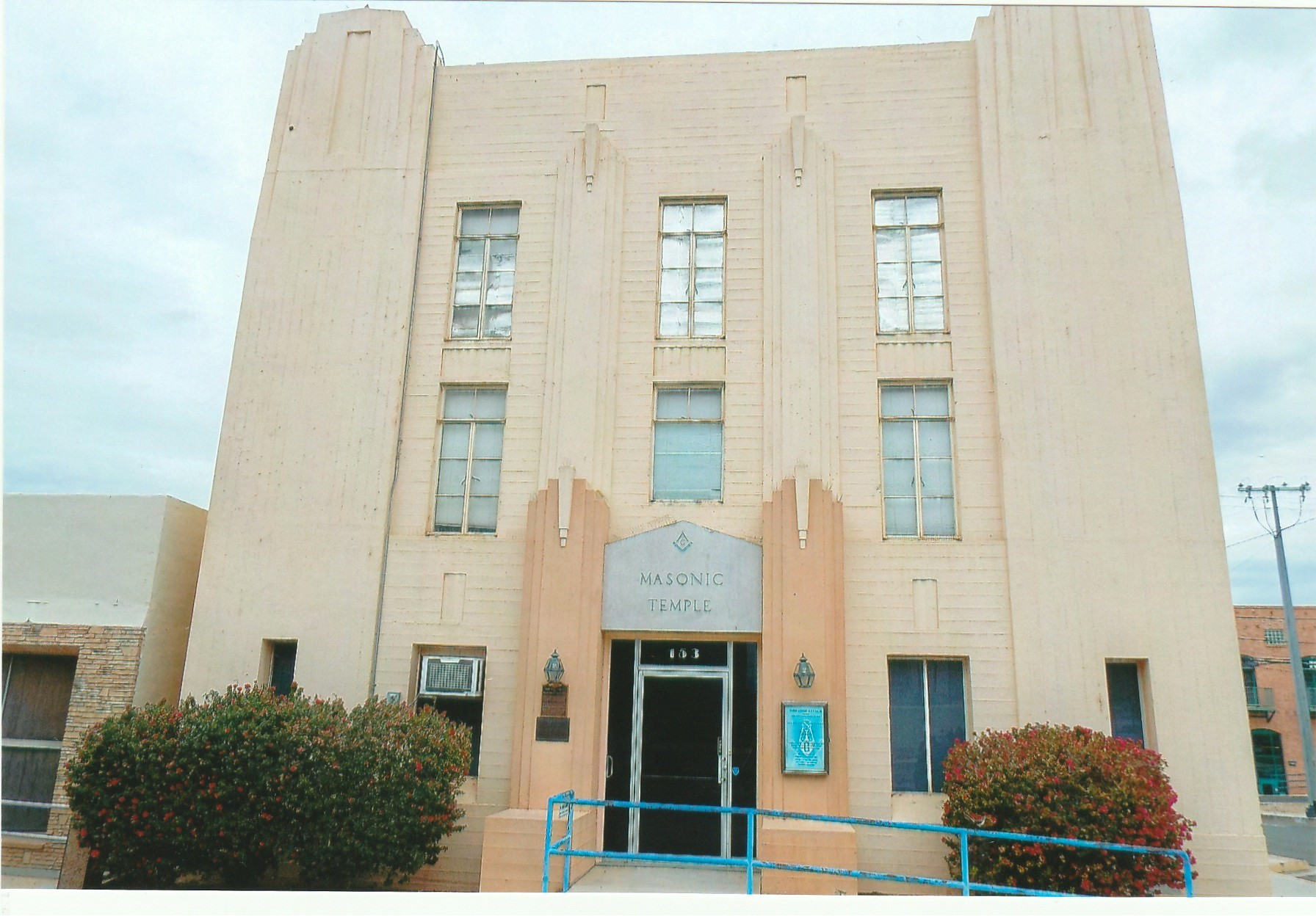
Masonic Temple – 1931

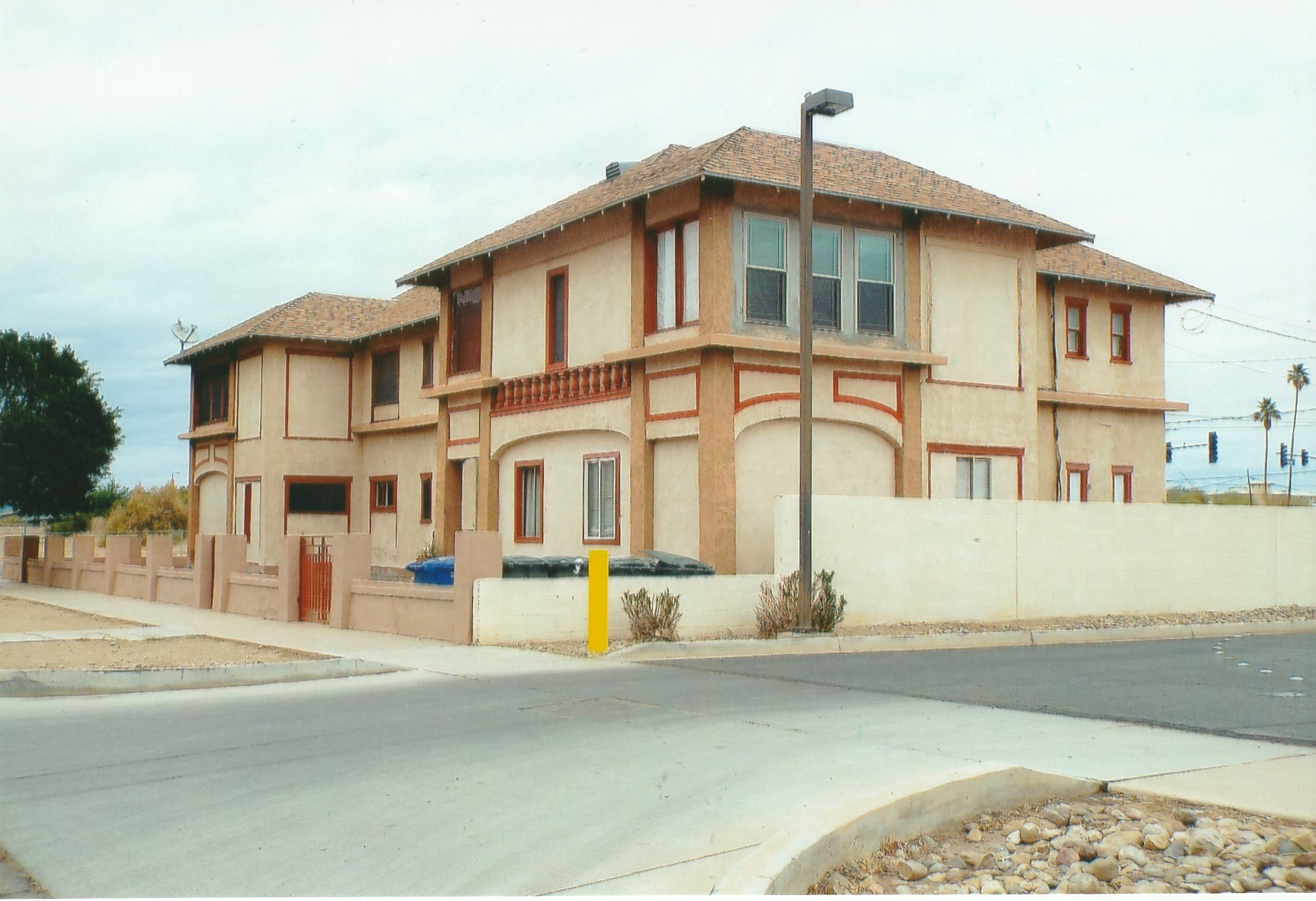
Pauley Apartments – 1926

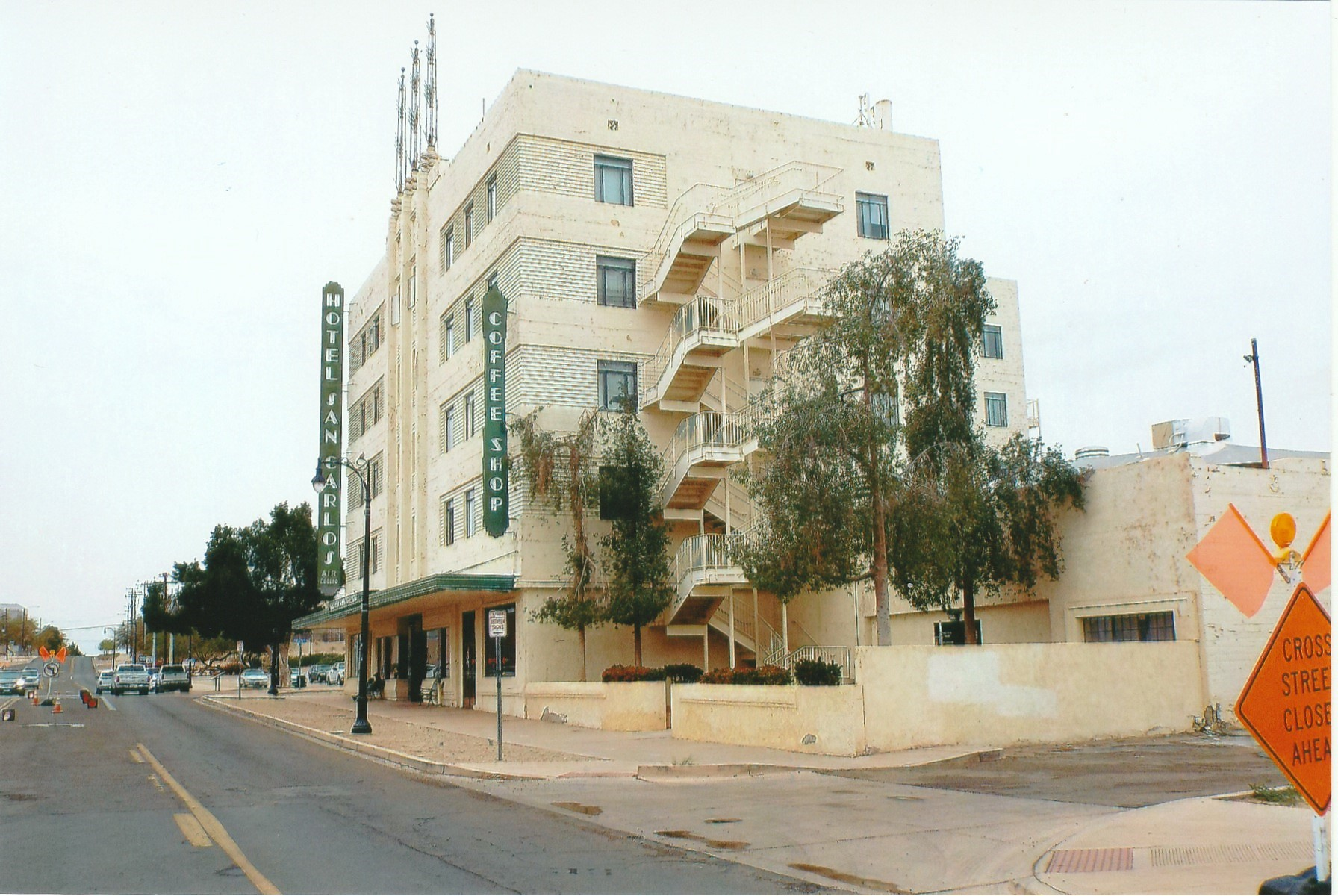
San Carlos Hotel –1930

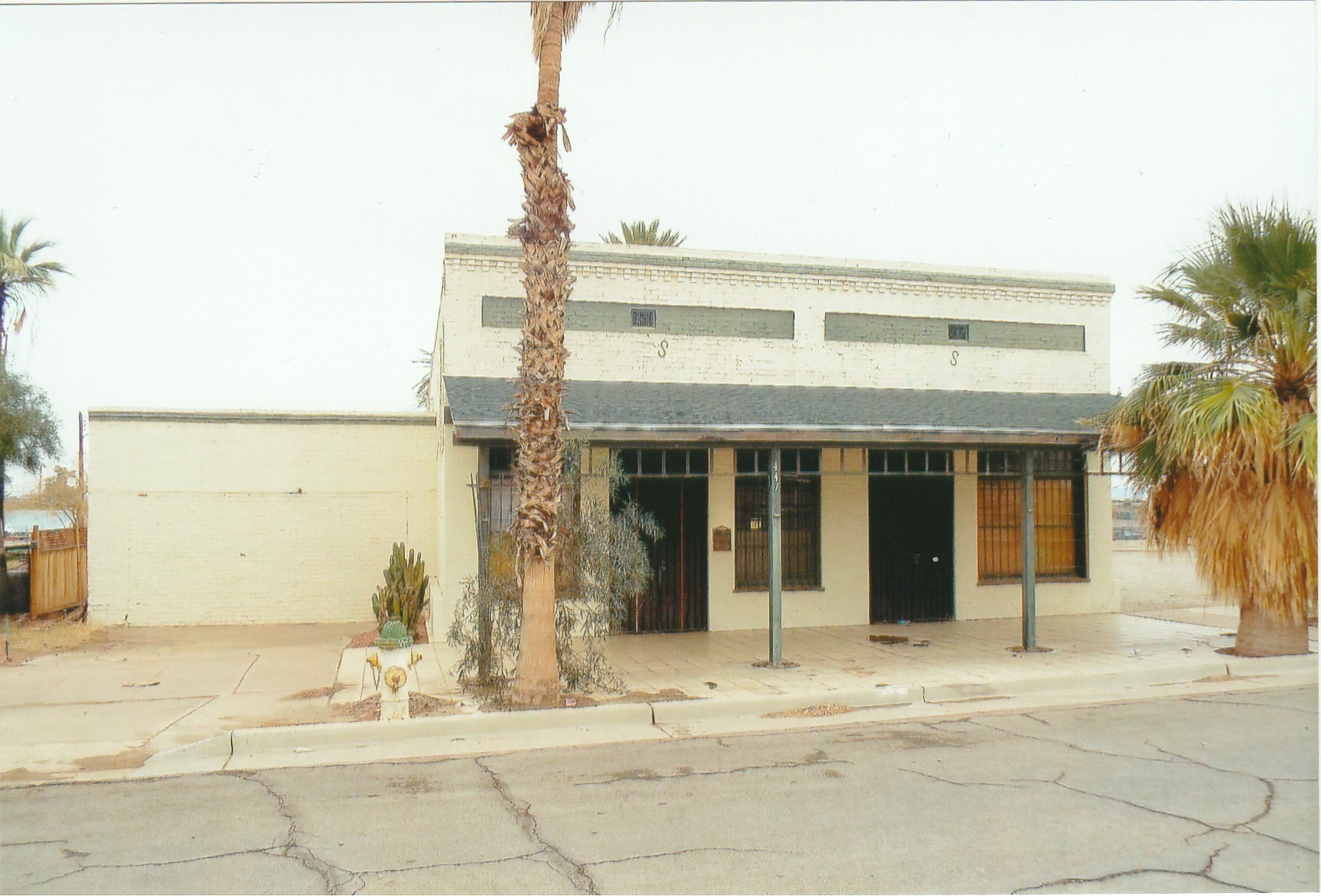
Stoffela Store – 1899

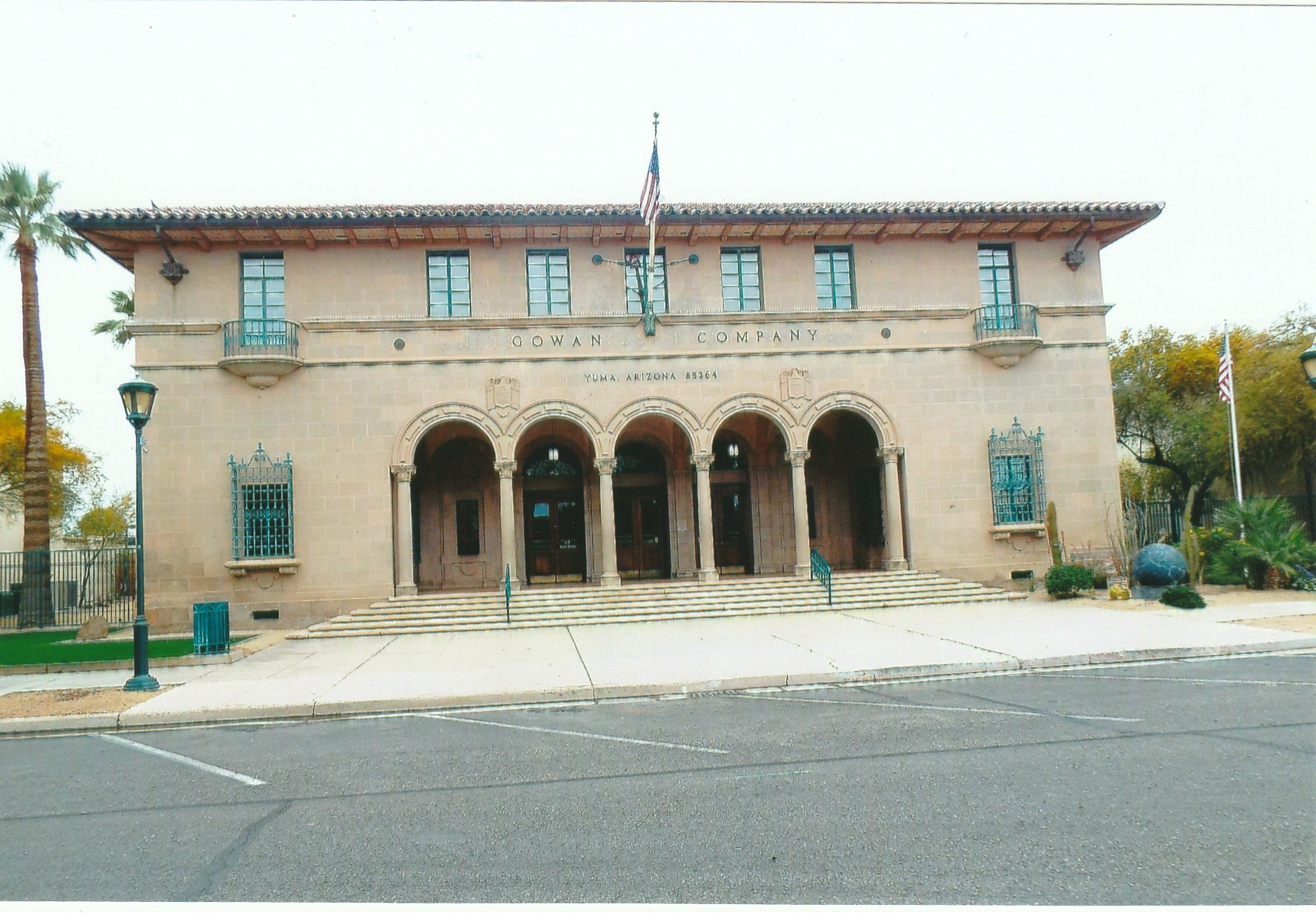
US Post Office/Yuma Main – 1922

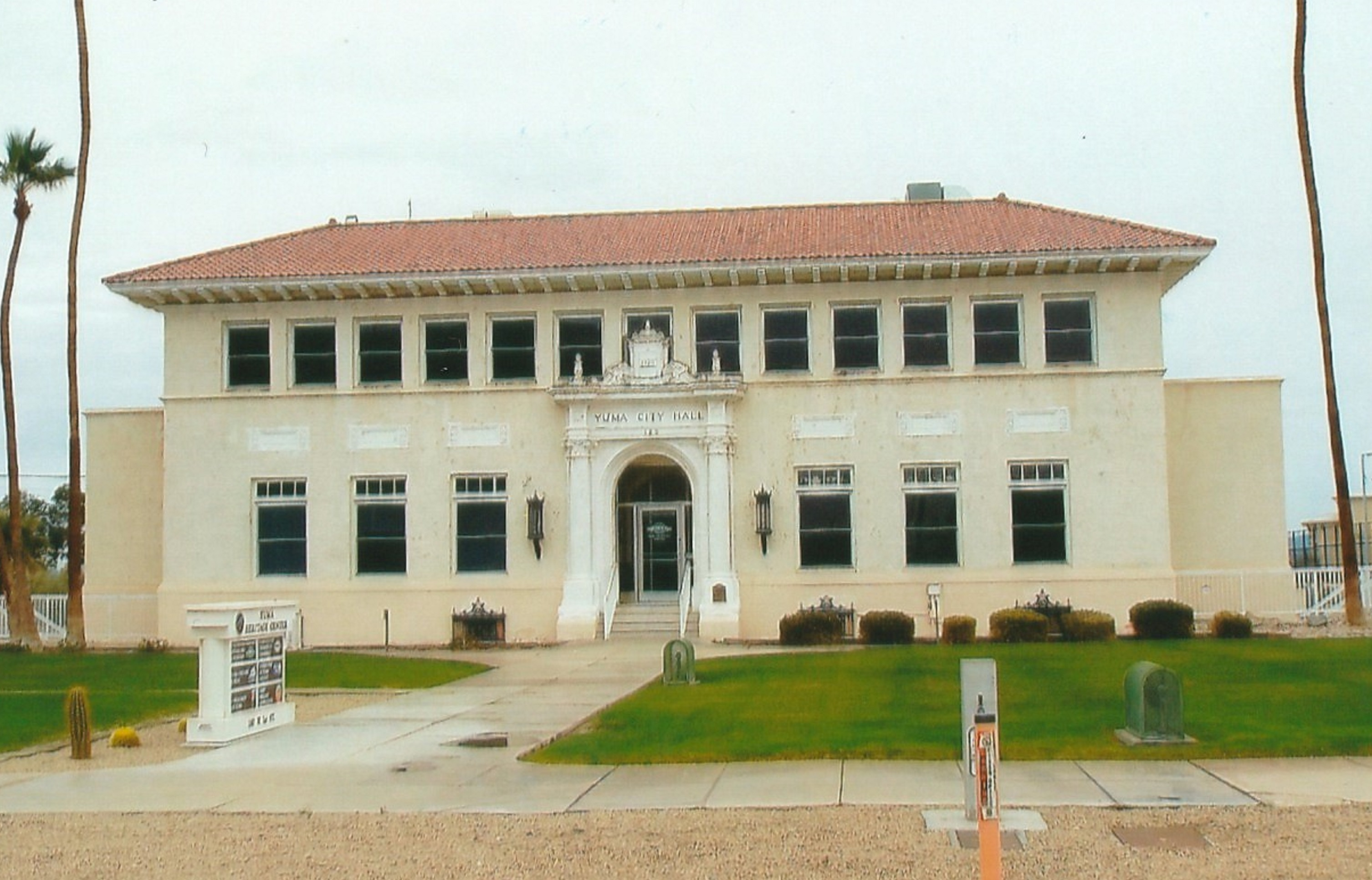
Yuma City Hall – 1921

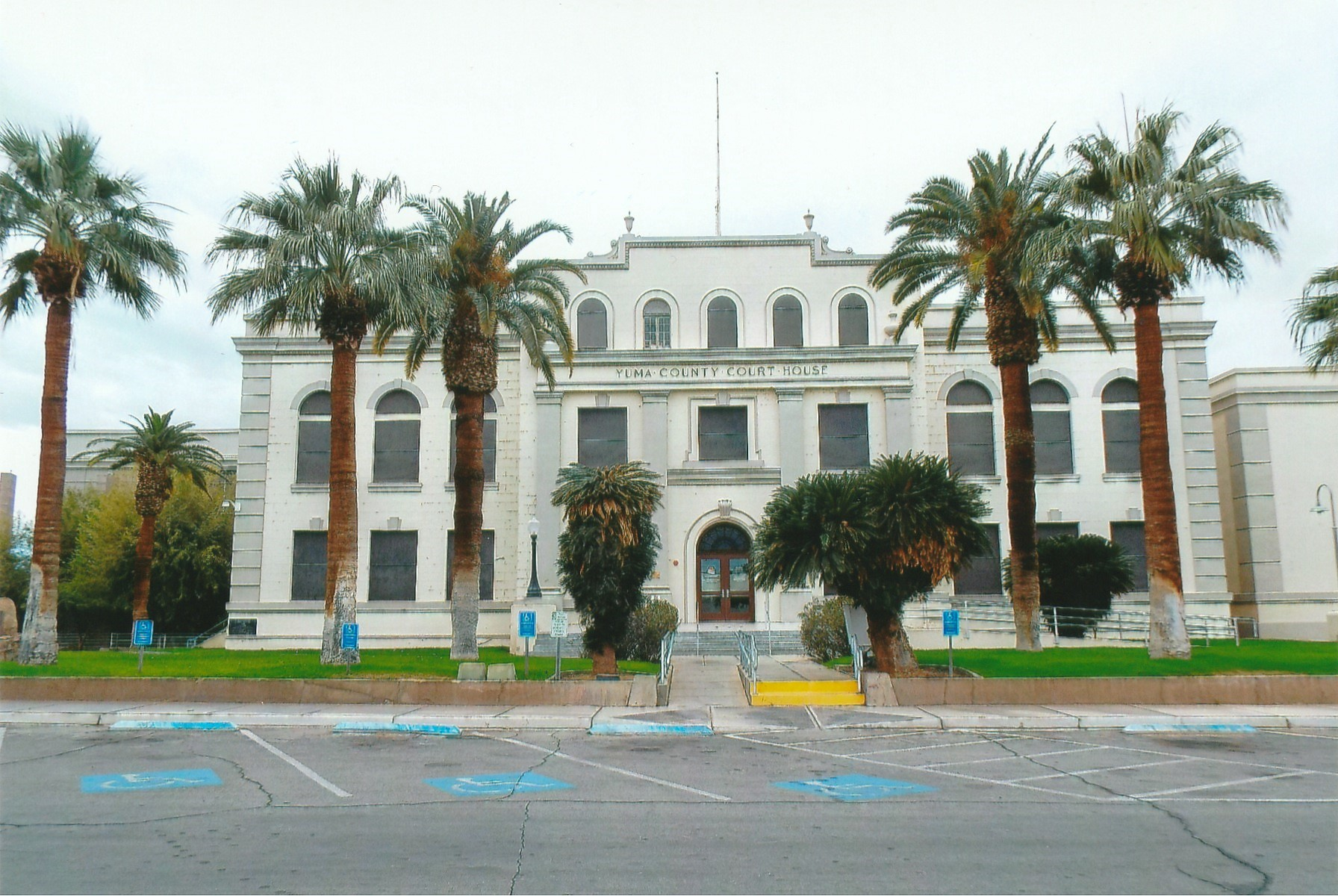
Yuma County Court House – 1928

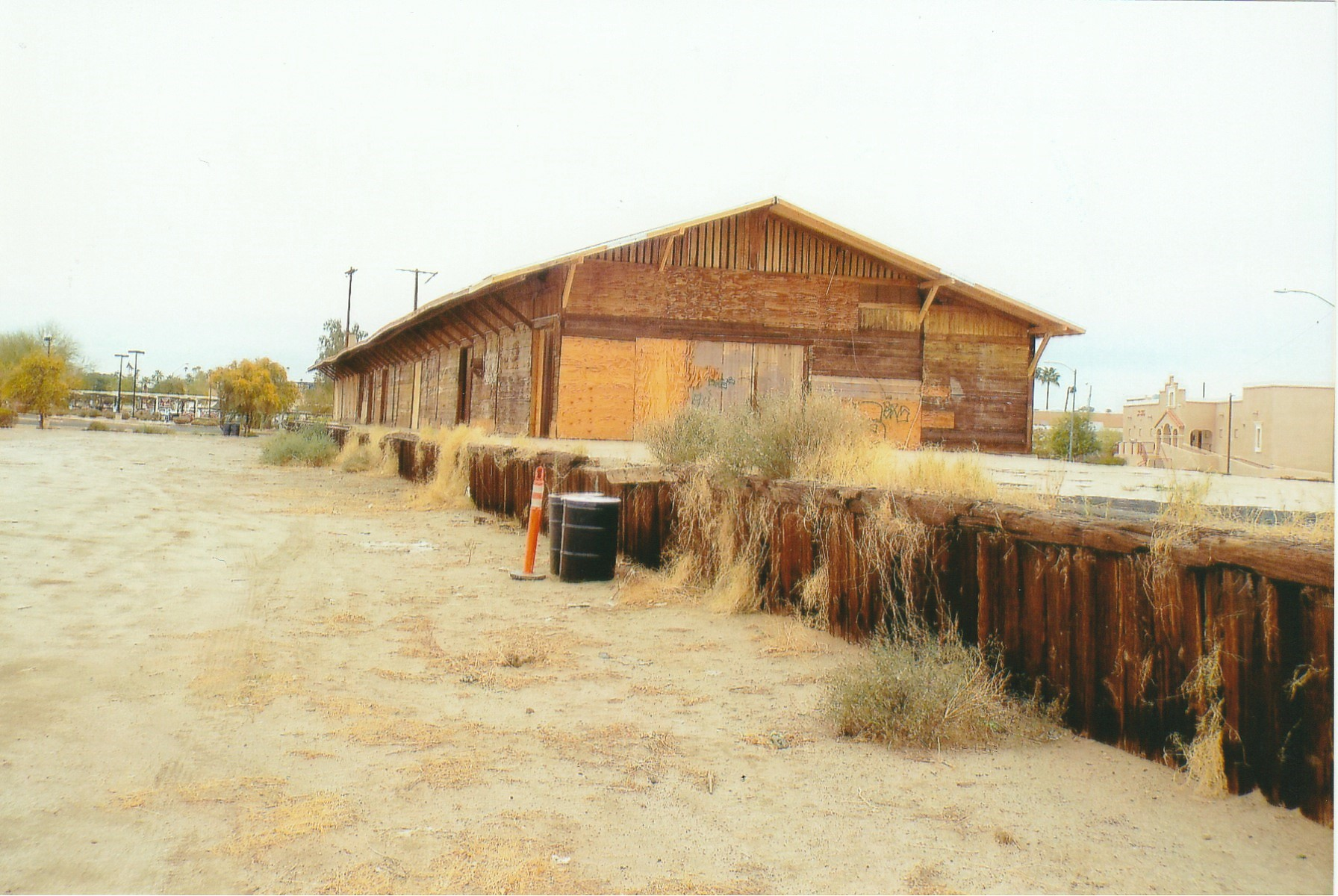
Southern Pacific Freight Depot – 1891

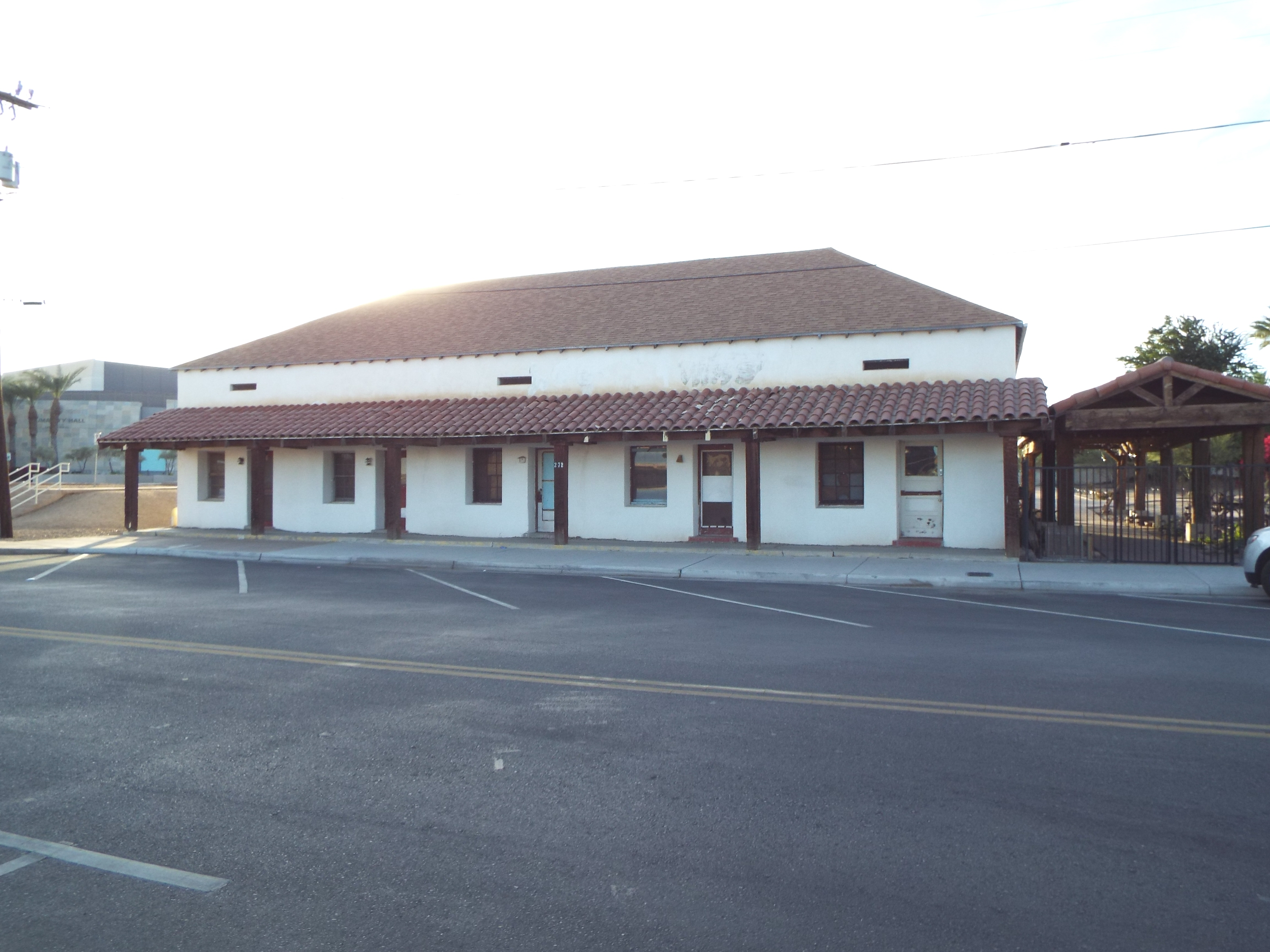
Molina Block – 1870

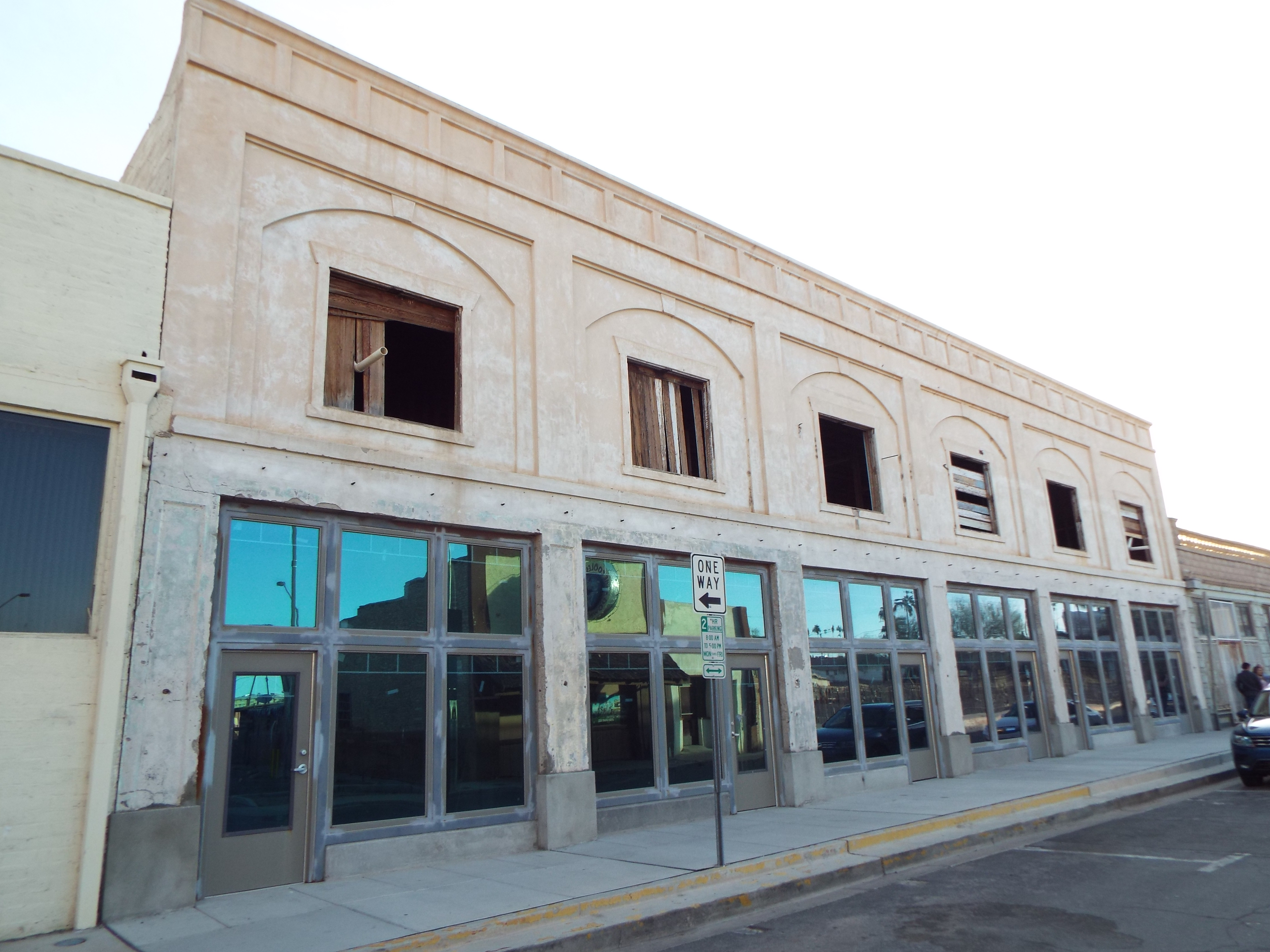
Drake Hotel – 1922

=== Educational institutions ===
The educational institutions considered historical are:

- The Fourth Avenue Jr. High School – located at 450 4th Ave. was built in 1920 and listed in the National Register of Historic Places on December 7, 1982, reference #82001633.
- The Mohawk Valley School – located at 5151 South Ave. 39 East. Added to the NRHP on December 29, 1986.
- The Roosevelt School – located at 550 W. 5th St. was added to the NRHP on December 7, 1982.
- The Mary Elizabeth Post Elementary School – located at 400 5th Ave. was built in 1940. The school was named in honor of Mary Elizabeth Post, an educator who was involved with women in politics. In 1903, she organized the first woman's club in Yuma. After working tirelessly to establish the Carnegie Library in Yuma, she became a member of its board on which she served for the remainder of her life.
Educational institutions

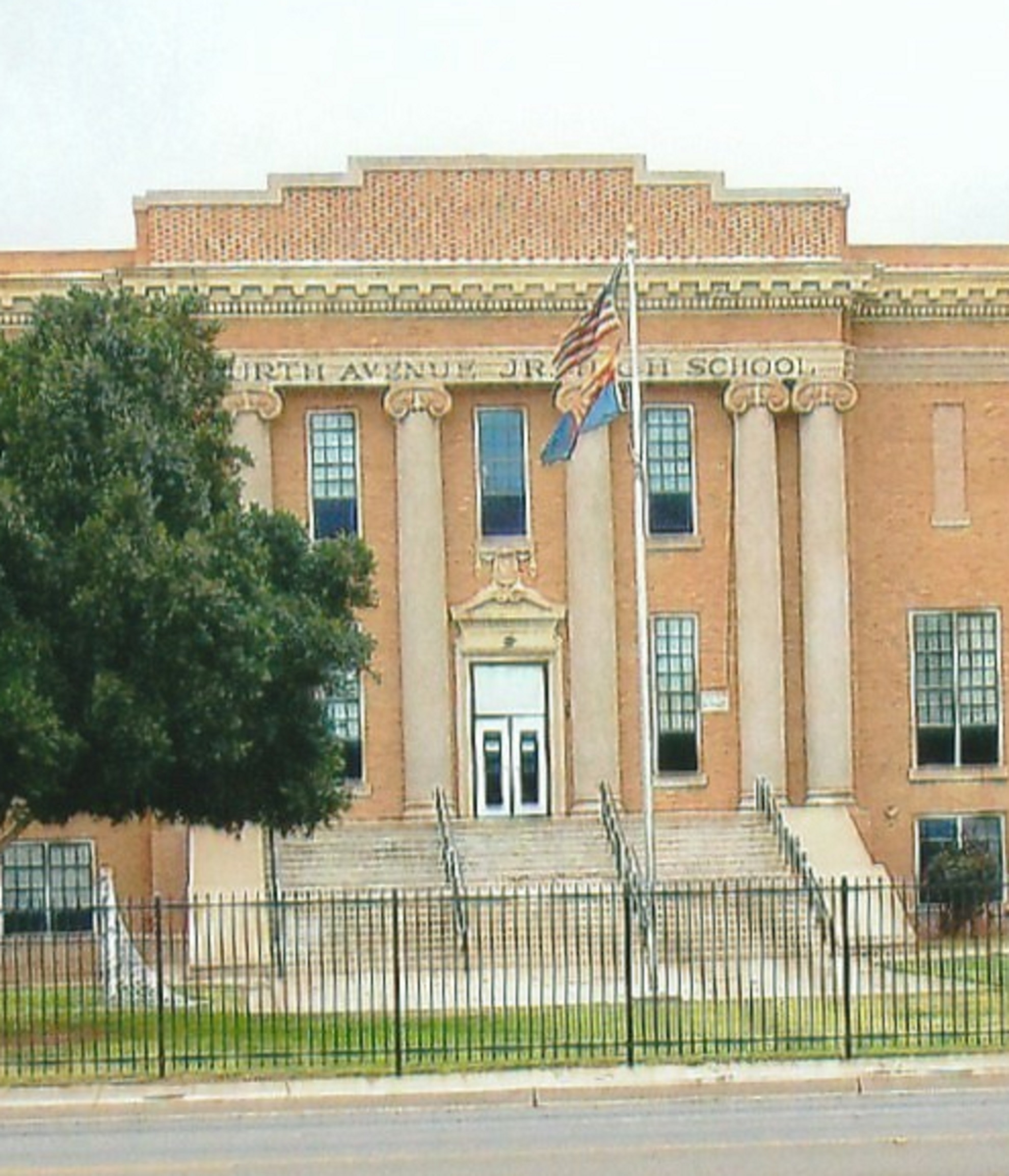
Fourth Avenue Jr. High School entrance

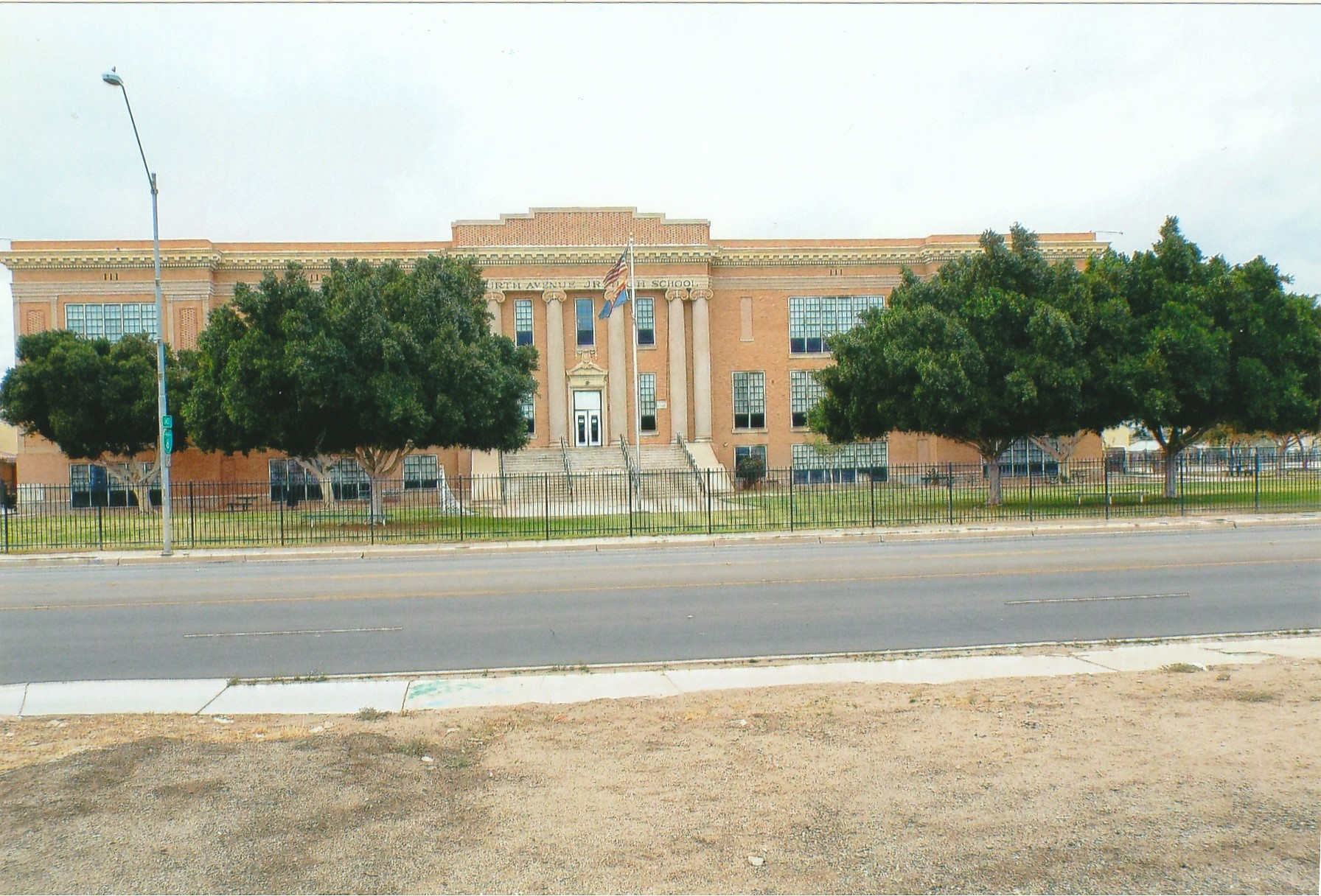
Fourth Avenue Jr. High School – 1920

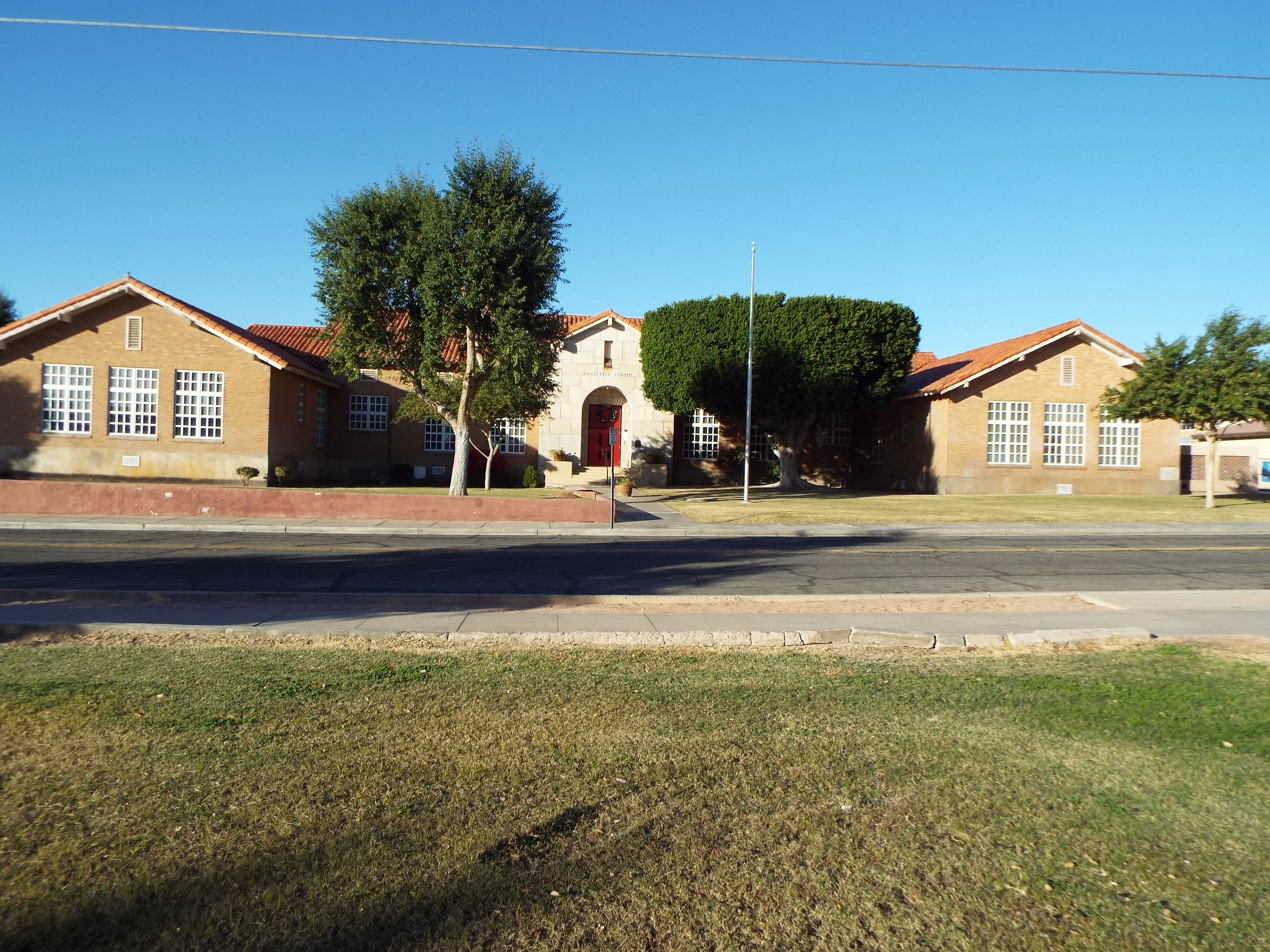
Roosevelt School – 1926

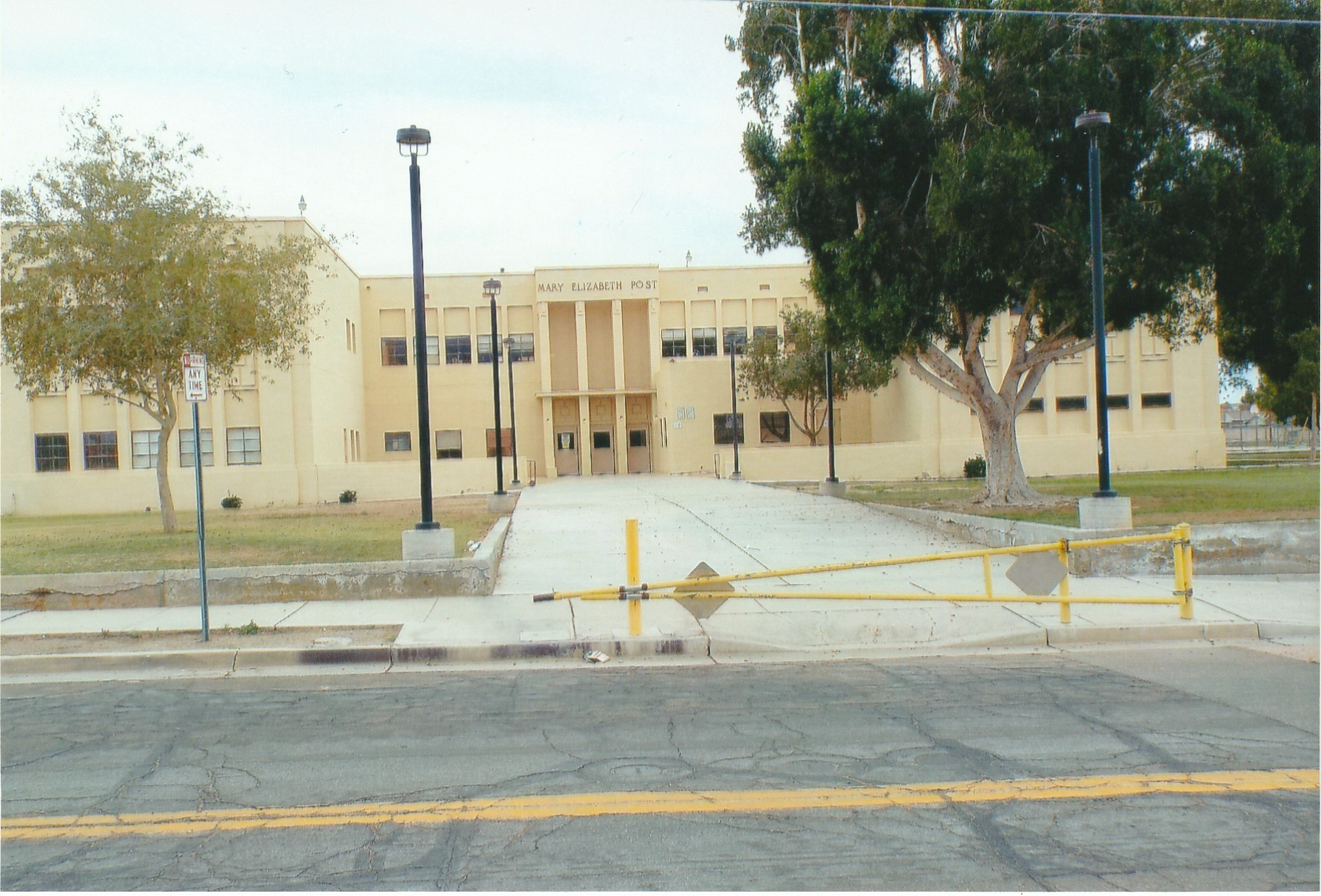
Mary Elizabeth Post Elementary School – 1940

=== Houses of religious worship ===
The following houses of religious worship are listed as historic:

- The Methodist Church – located at 256 1st. Ave. was built in 1905 and listed in the National Register of Historic Places on December 7, 1982, reference #82001645.
- The Methodist Parsonage – located on 248 1st. Ave. was built in 1893. It was listed in the National Register of Historic Places on December 7, 1982, reference #82001646.
- St. Paul's Episcopal Church – located at 637 2nd Ave. was built in 1909 and listed in the National Register of Historic Places on December 7, 1982, reference #82001657.
- Golden Marriage Bell Wedding Chapel – located at 106 S. Madison Street. Originally the "Popular Drug Store" it was built in 1891. Listed in the National Register of Historic Places on March 10, 1994, as part of the Brinley Avenue Historic District, reference #94000068.
Houses of Religious Worship
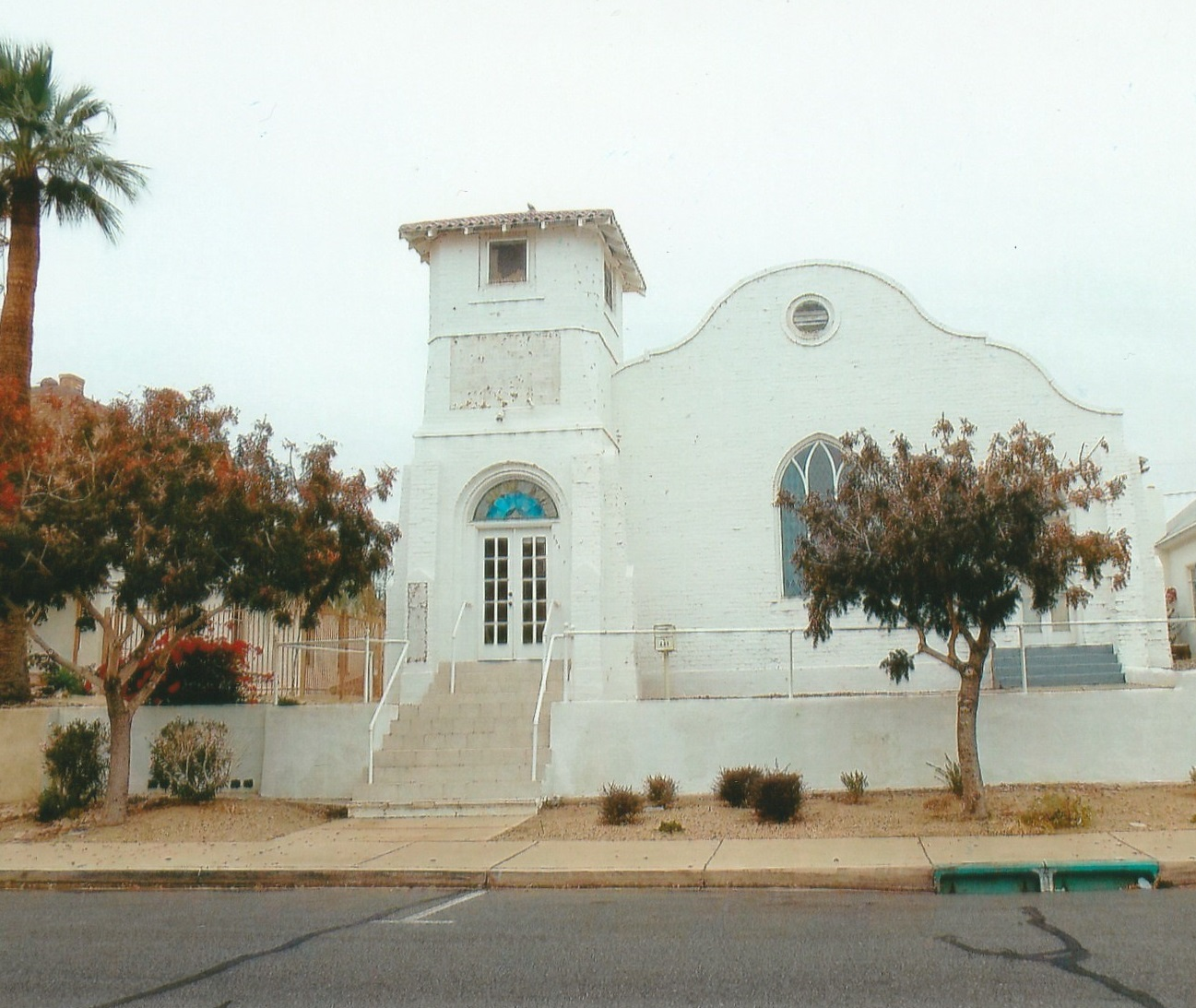
Methodist Church – 1905

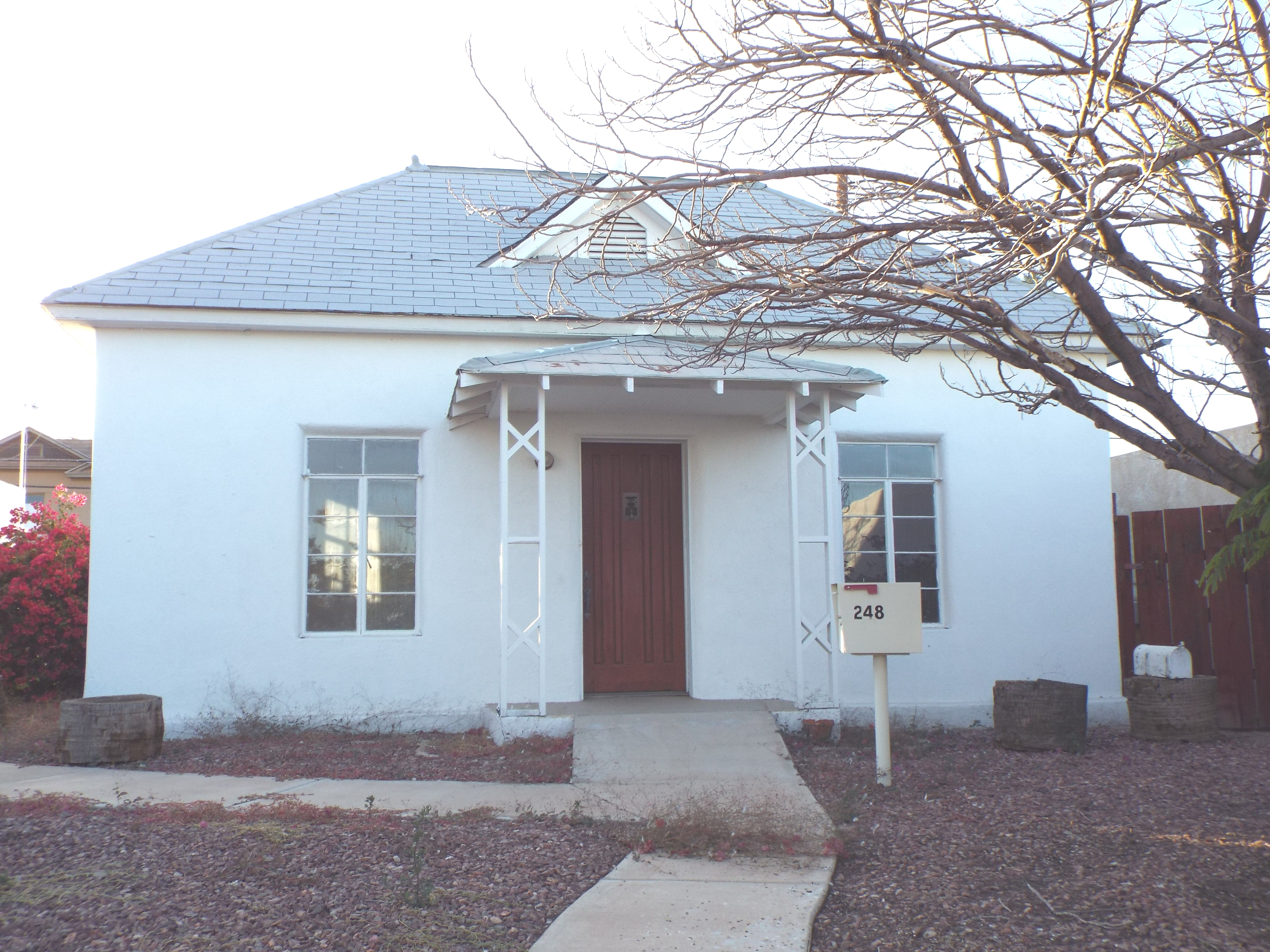
Methodist Parsonage – 1893

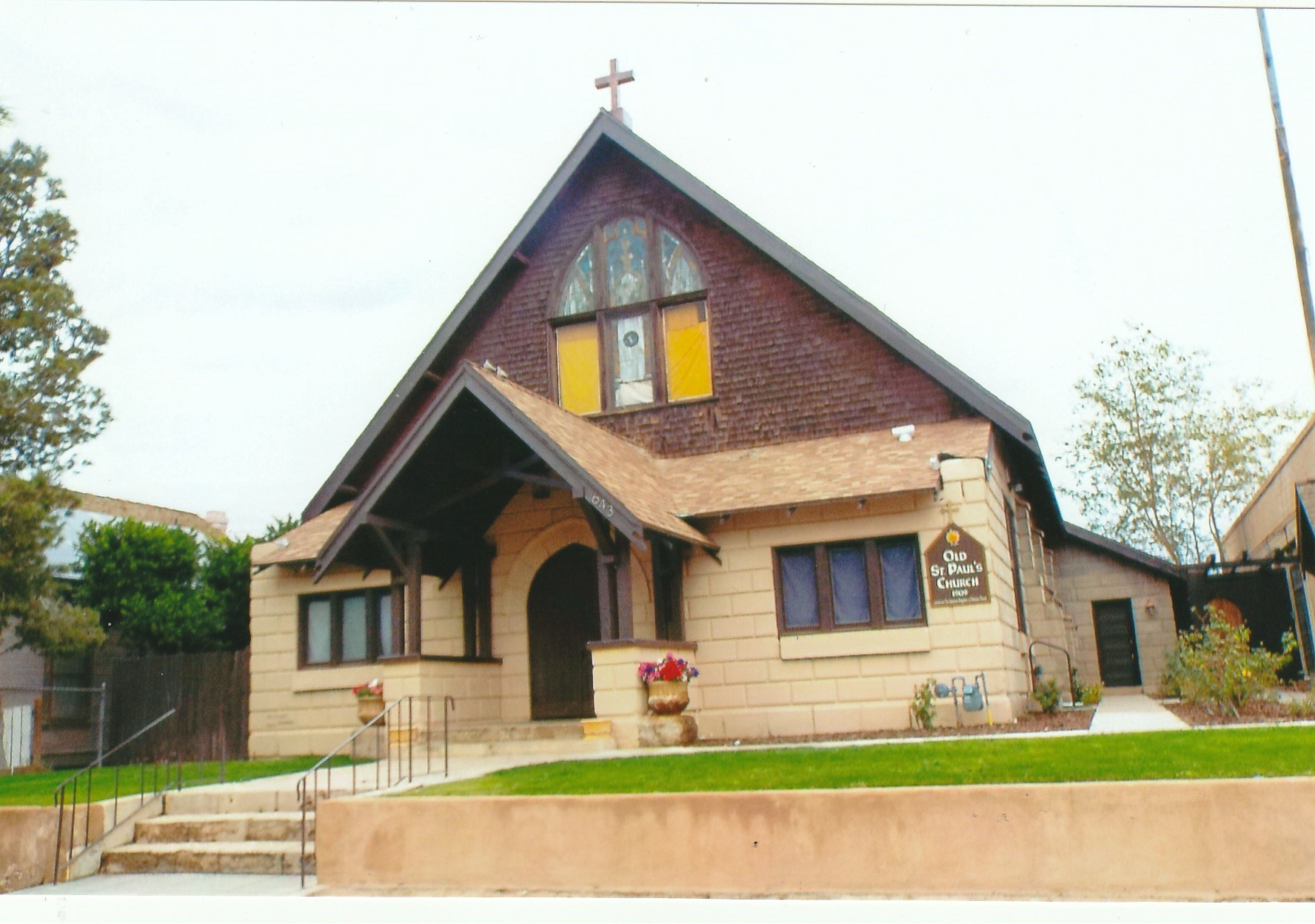
St. Paul's Episcopal Church – 1909

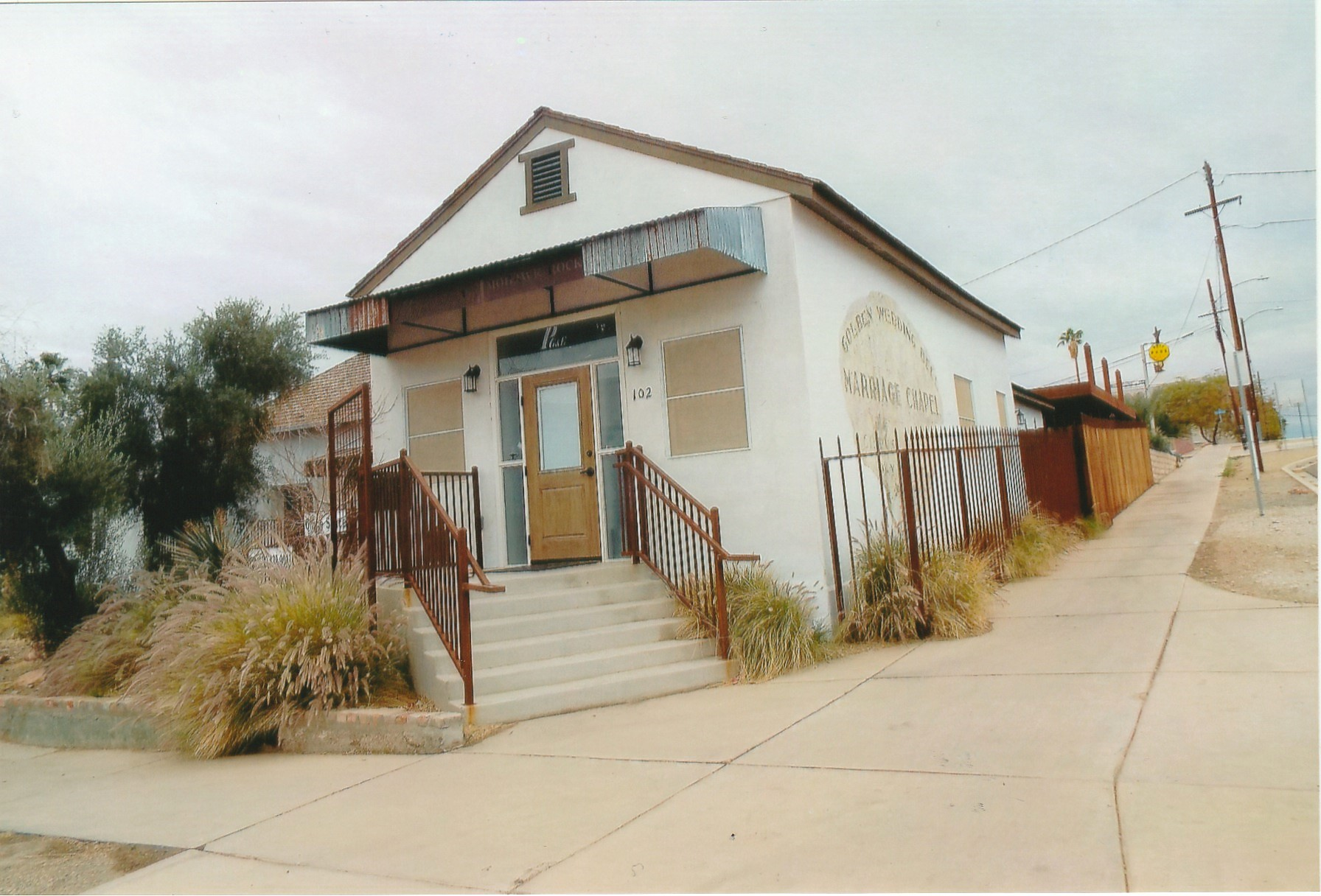
Golden Marriage Bell Wedding Chapel – 1891

=== Houses ===
The following is brief description of the houses in Yuma which are listed as historical by the National Register of Historic Places:

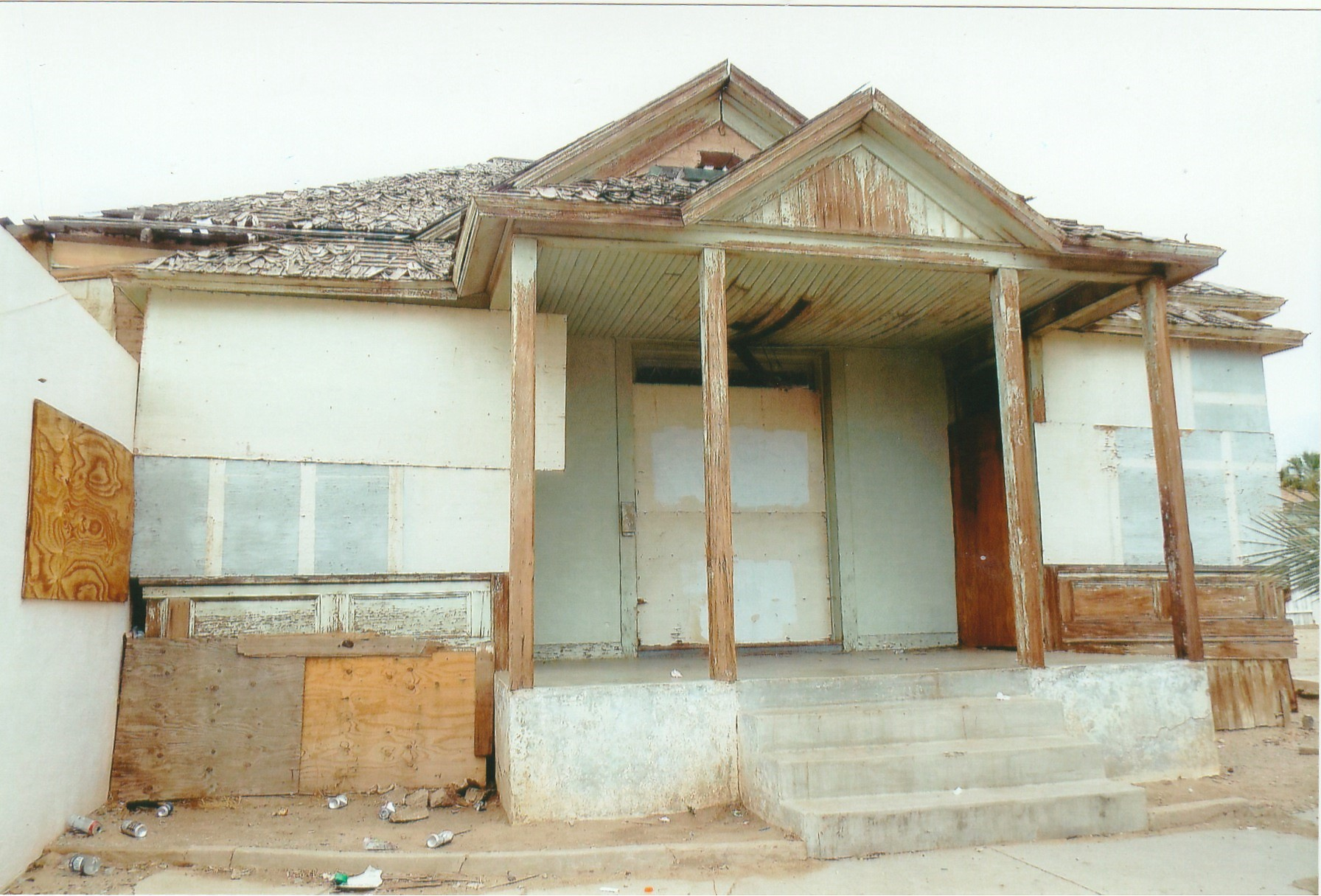
The state of the Peter Hodge House is an example of how some historic properties end up in total abandonment

- The Caruthers House located at 441 2nd Ave. Listed in the National Register of Historic Places on December 7, 1982.
- The Connor House located at 281 S. 1st Ave. Listed in the National Register of Historic Places on December 7, 1982.
- The Double Roof House located at 553 4th Ave. Listed in the National Register of Historic Places on December 7, 1982.
- The Balsz House located at 475 2nd Ave. Listed in the National Register of Historic Places on December 7, 1982.
- The Frank Ewing House located at 406 2nd Ave. was built in 1920 and listed in the National Register of Historic Places on December 7, 1982, reference #82001632. Frank Ewing was a businessman who invested and owned property. He served two terms as Mayor in Yuma.
- The Ruth Ewing House located at 712 2nd Ave. was built in 1906 and listed in the National Register of Historic Places on December 7, 1982, reference #82004844.
- The Fredley House located at 408 2nd Ave. Listed in the National Register of Historic Places on December 7, 1982.
- The Alfred Griffin House located at 641 1st. Ave. was built in 1905 and listed in the National Register of Historic Places on December 7, 1982, reference #82001637. Alfred Griffin, caretaker of the Yuma Grammar school.
- The Peter Hodge House located at 209 Orange Ave. was built in 1905 and listed in the National Register of Historic Places on December 7, 1982, reference #82001638.
- The E. B. Jackson House located at 572 1st. Ave. was built in 1906 and listed in the National Register of Historic Places on December 7, 1982, reference #82001640.
- The Jerry Kent House located at 450 3rd Ave. Listed in the National Register of Historic Places on December 7, 1982.
- The Henry Levy House located at 602 2nd Ave. Listed in the National Register of Historic Places on December 7, 1982.
- The George Marable House located at 482 Orange Ave. was built in 1906 and listed in the National Register of Historic Places on December 7, 1982, reference #82001643.
- The Carmelita Mayhew House located at 660 1st. Ave. was built in 1909 and listed in the National Register of Historic Places on December 7, 1982, reference #82001644. Carmelita was the wife of Felix Mayhew, the discoverer of the North Star Mine.
- The A.B. Ming House located at 468 Orange Ave. Listed in the NBational Register of Historic Places on December 7, 1982.
- The Norton House located at 226 S. 1st Ave. Listed in the National Register of Historic Places on December 7, 1982.
- The Ortiz House 206 S. located at 1st Ave. Listed in the National Register of Historic Places on December 7, 1982.
- The Pancrazi House located at 432 Madison was built in 1905 and listed in the National Register of Historic Places on December 7, 1982, reference #82001651. Ange T. Pancrazi was an immigrant from France who became a businessman, U.S. Postmaster and City Treasurer.
- The Clara Smith Riley House located at 734 2nd Ave. was built in 1909 and listed in the National Register of Historic Places on December 7, 1982, reference #82001654.
- The Russell-Williamson House located at 652 2nd Ave. Listed in the National Register of Historic Places on December 7, 1982.
- The J. Homer Smith House located at 600 5th Ave. Listed in the National Register of Historic Places on December 7, 1982.
- The Brown House located at 268 1st. Ave. was built in 1893 and listed in the National Register of Historic Places on December 7, 1982, reference #82001626
- The Polhamus House located at 224-226 Madison was built in 1869. The house was purchased by steamboat pilot Captain Isaac Polhamus in 1884. It was used as a hospital during the 1891 typhoid epidemic and in 1915 became Yuma's first public library.
- The Sanguinetti House built in 1870 and located at 240 Madison Ave. The house was built for businessman E.F. Sanguinetti and his family. It now houses the Sanguinetti House Museum and Gardens.
- The Ghiotte House built in 1915 and located at 90 W. 2nd Street. The house was built for John Ghiotti, an immigrant from Genoa Italy, who first worked at the Gandolfo store and later operated four grocery stores of his own.
Houses
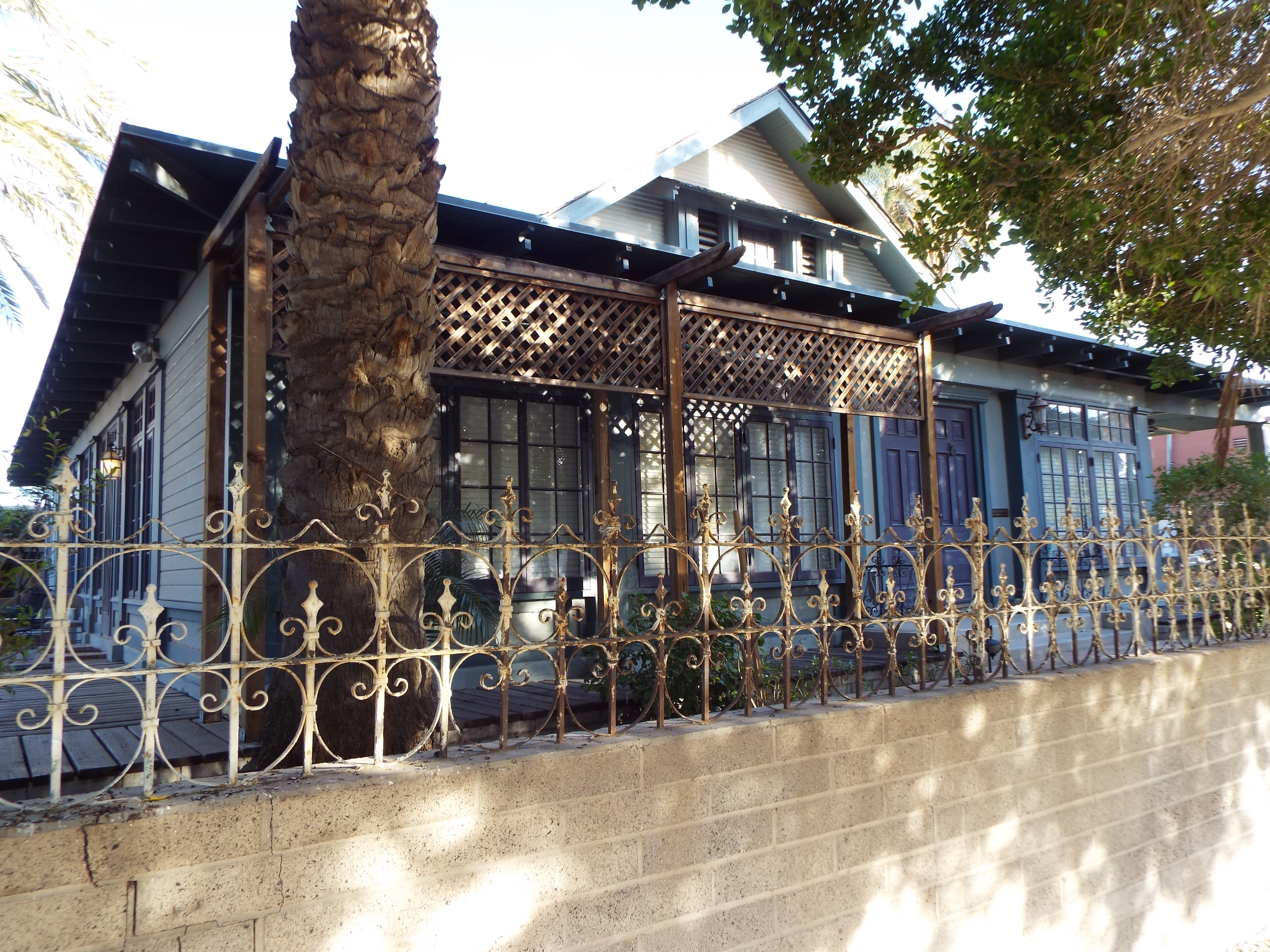
Caruthers House – 1875

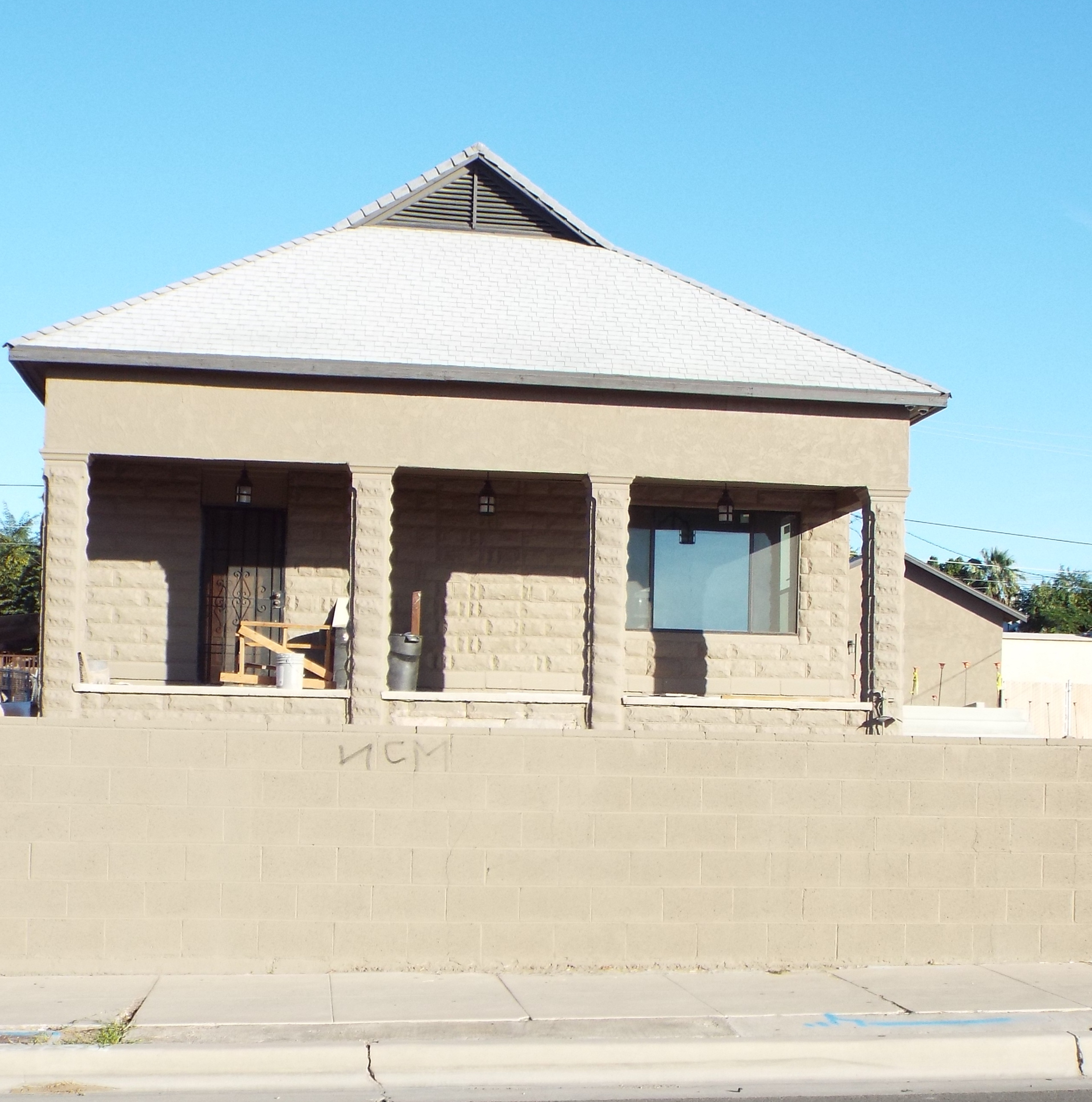
Double Roof House – 1900

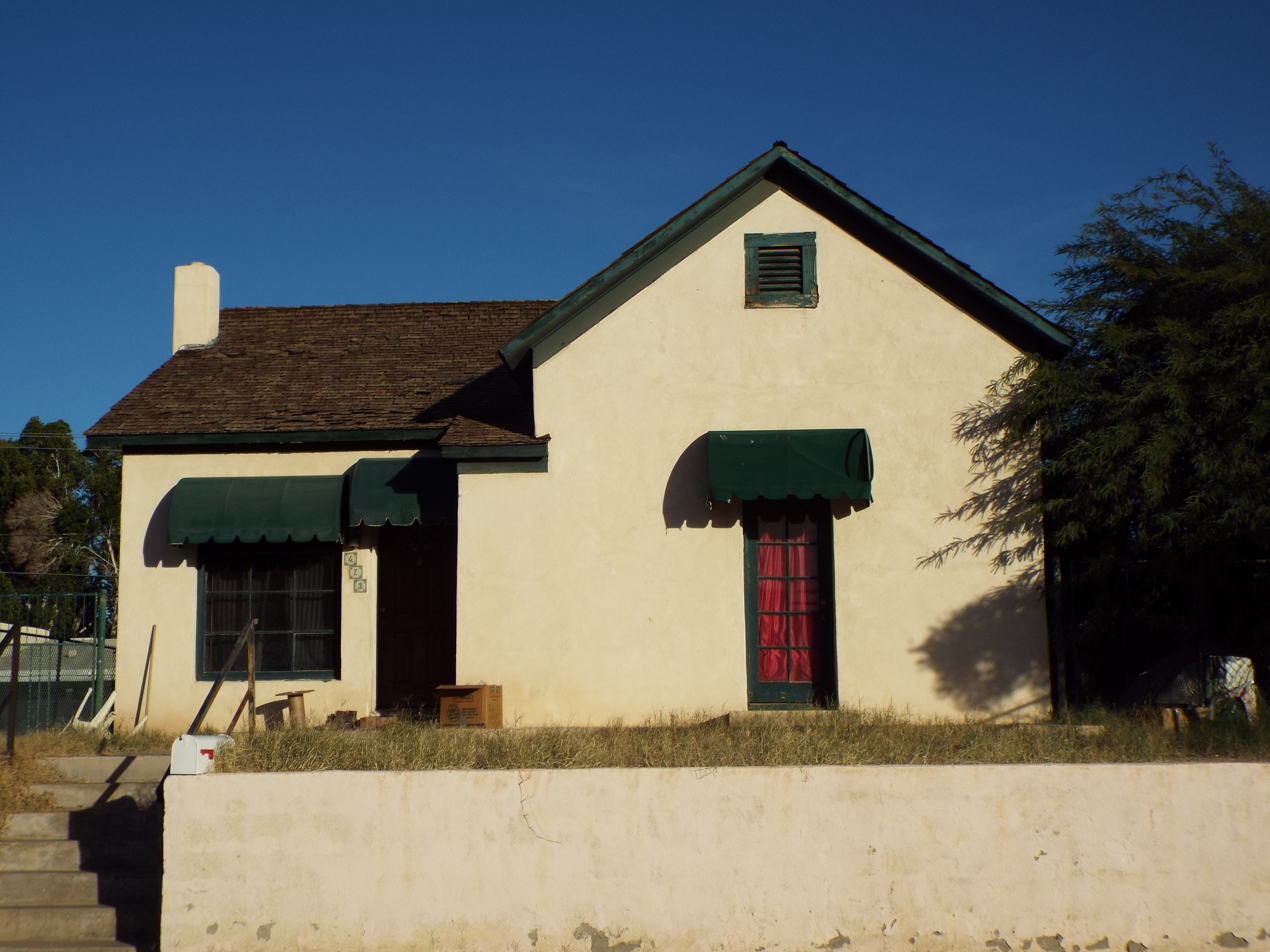
Balsz House – 1875

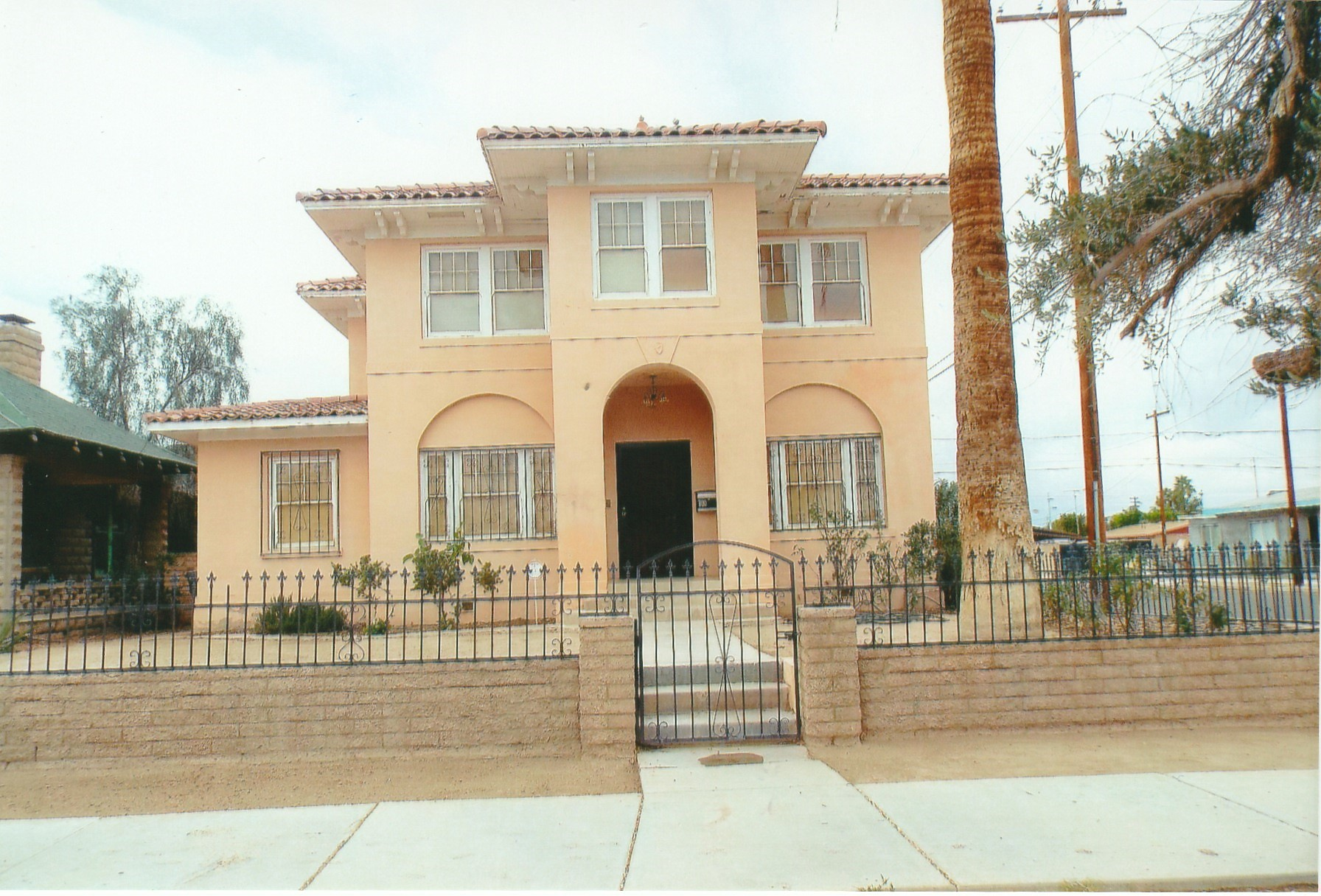
Frank Ewing House – 1920

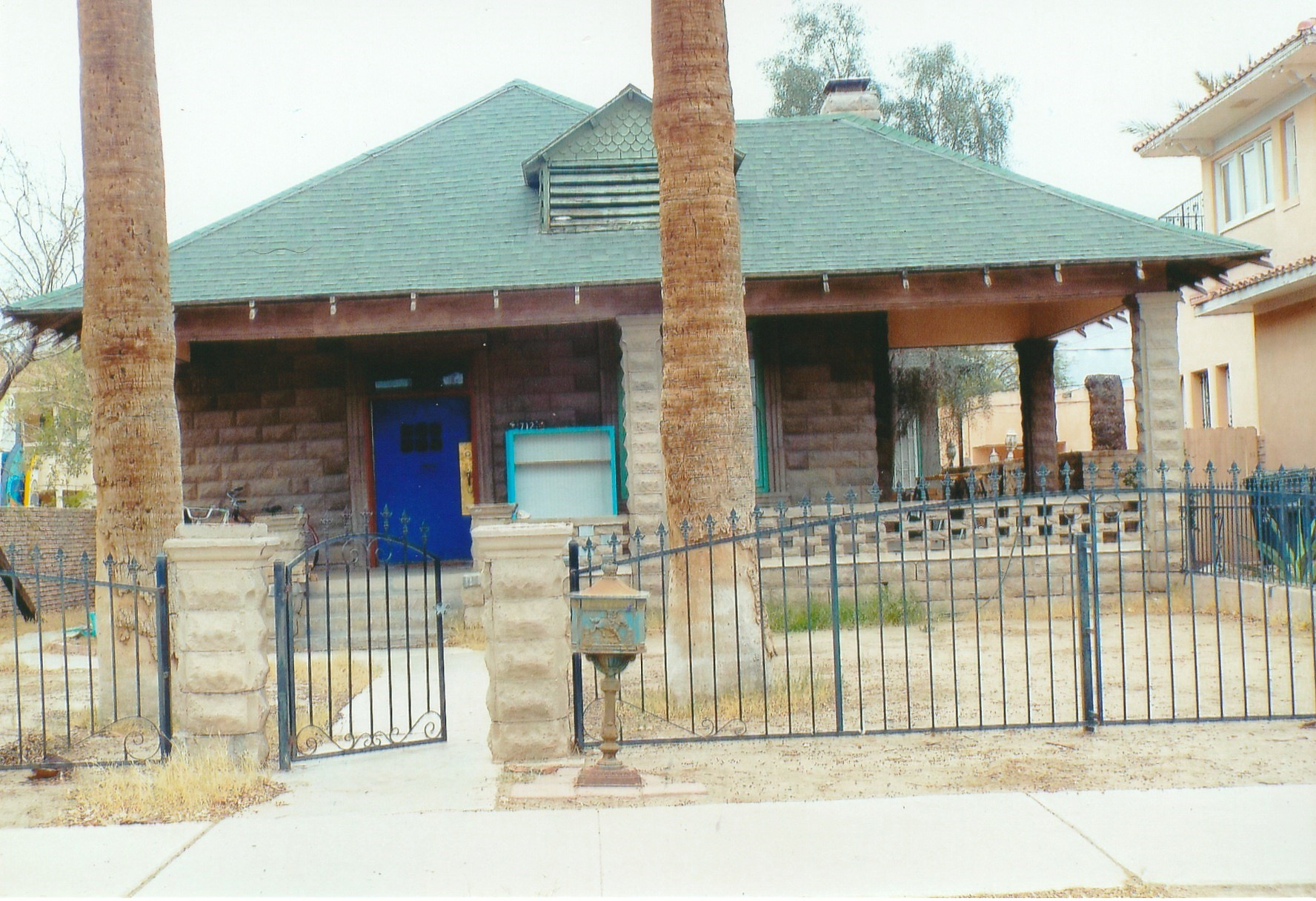
Ruth Ewing House – 1906

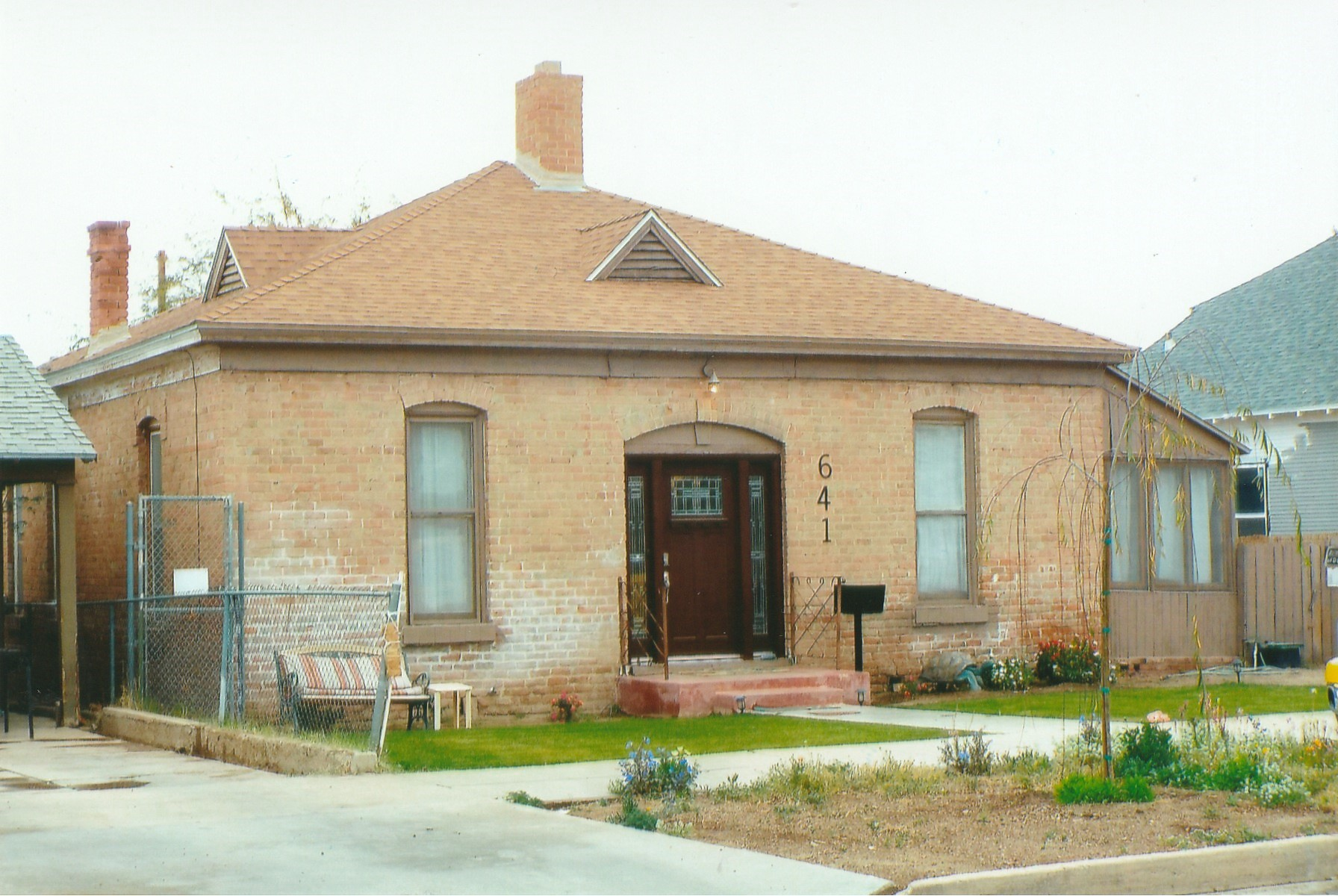
Alfred Griffin House – 1905

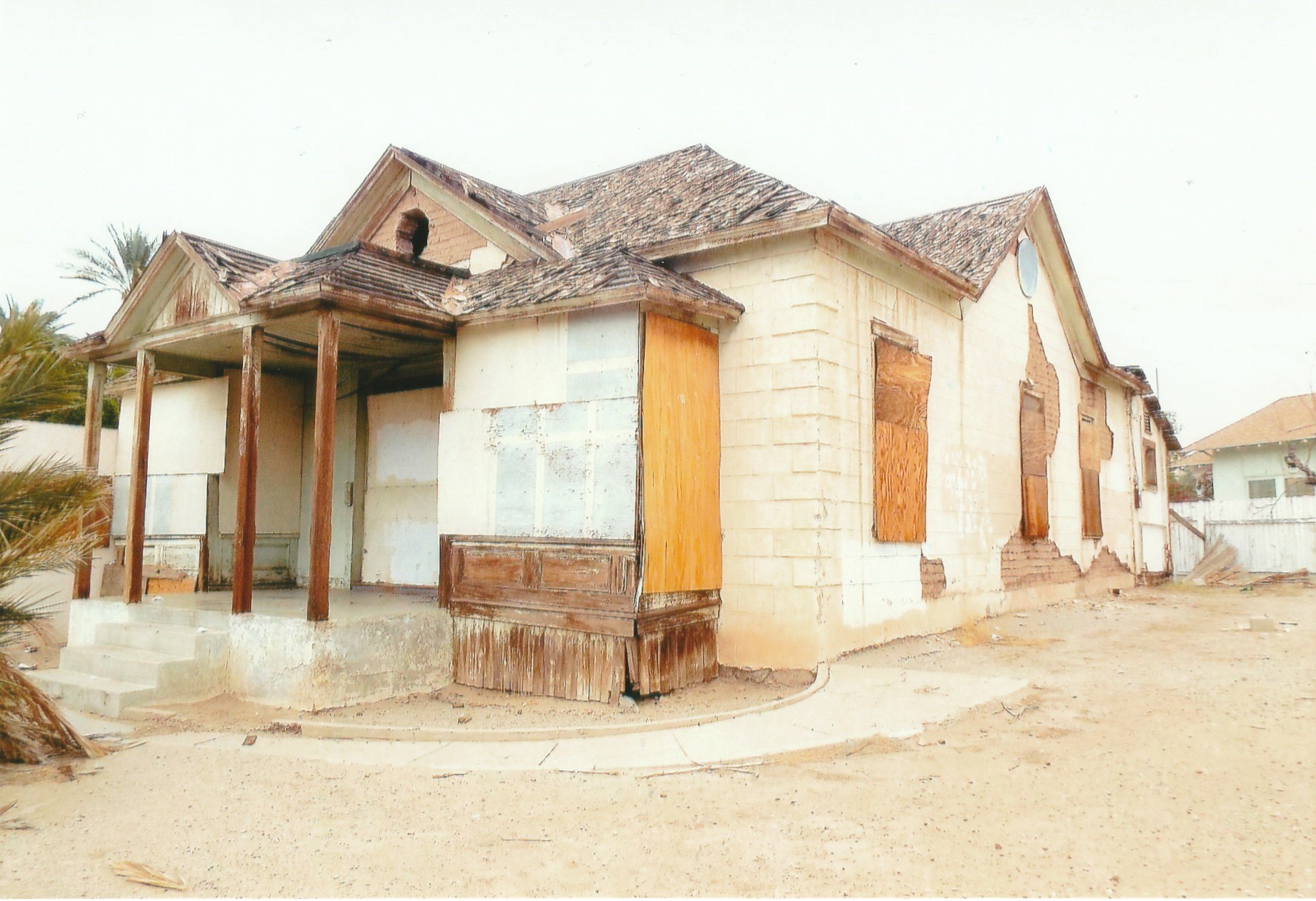
Peter Hodge House – 1905

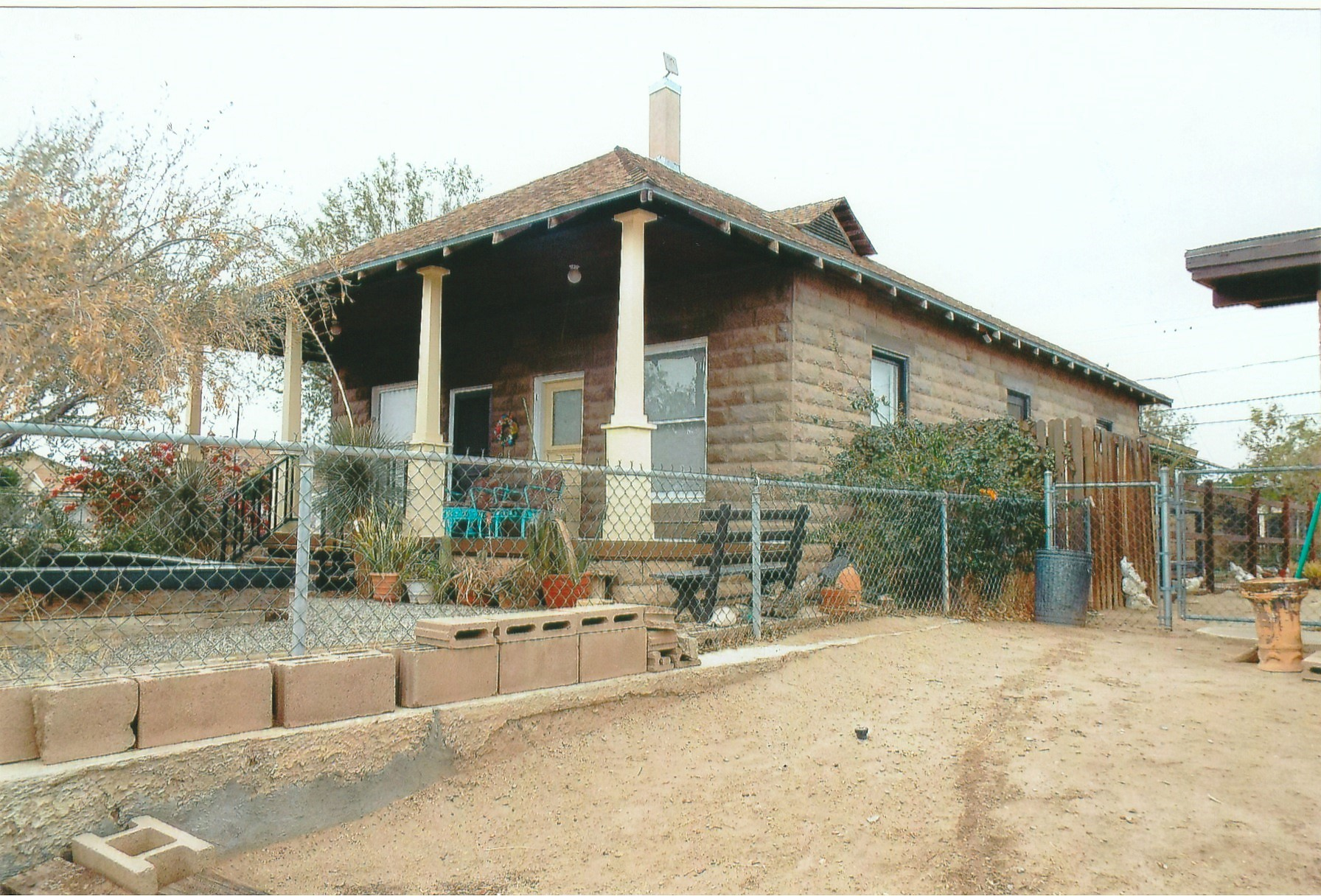
E. B. Jackson House – 1906

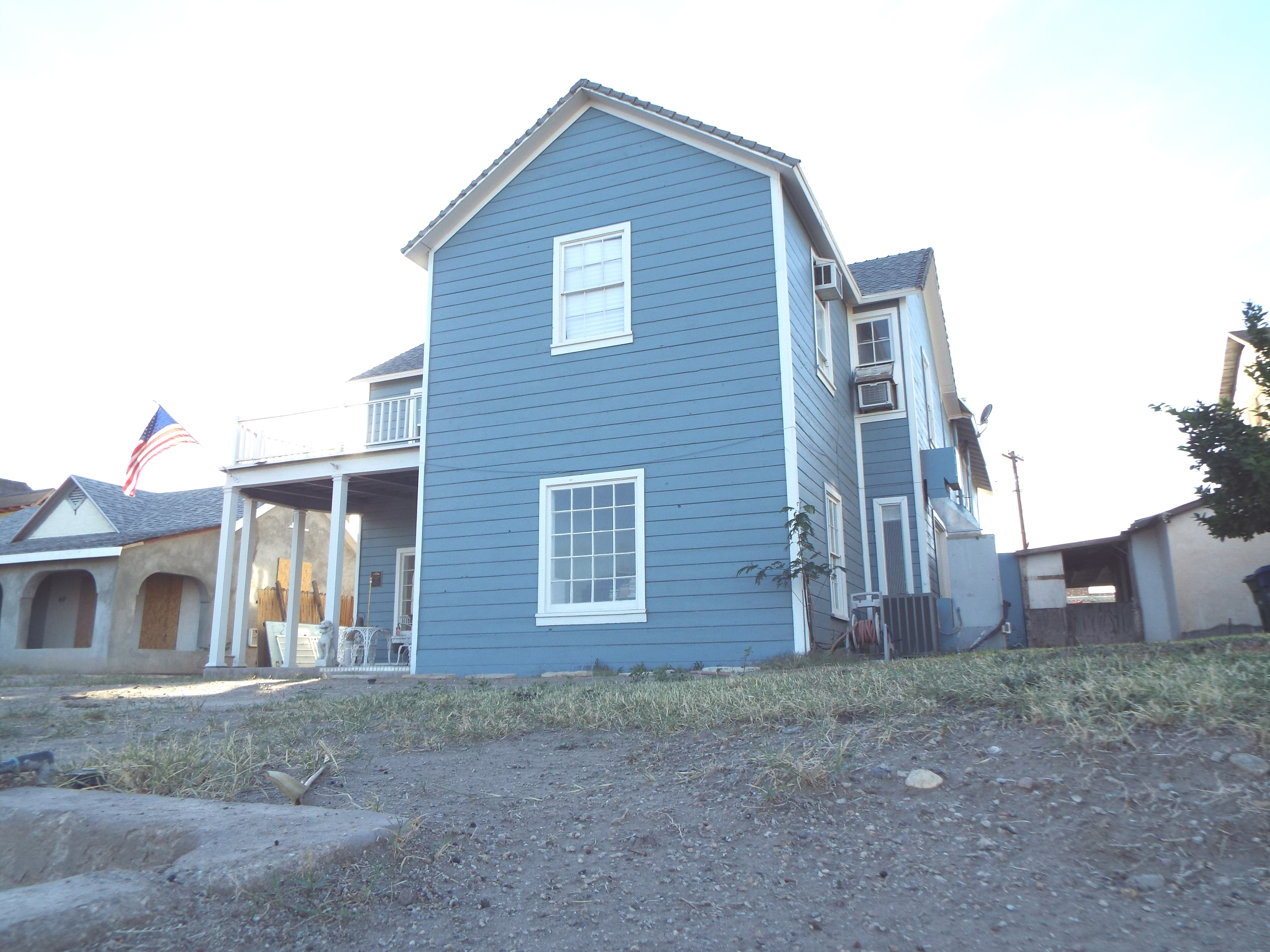
Jerry Kent House – 1900

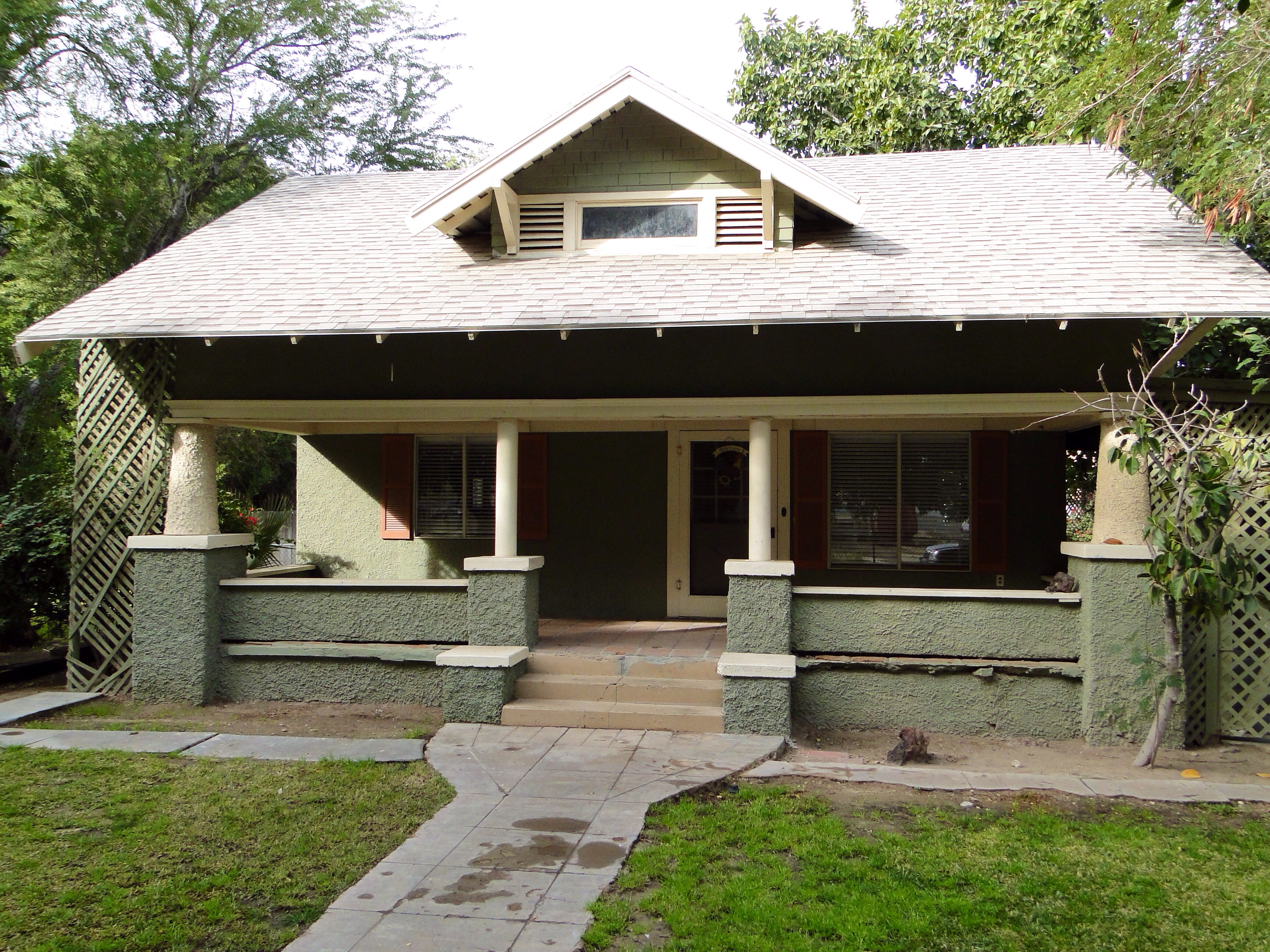
Henry Levy House – 1900

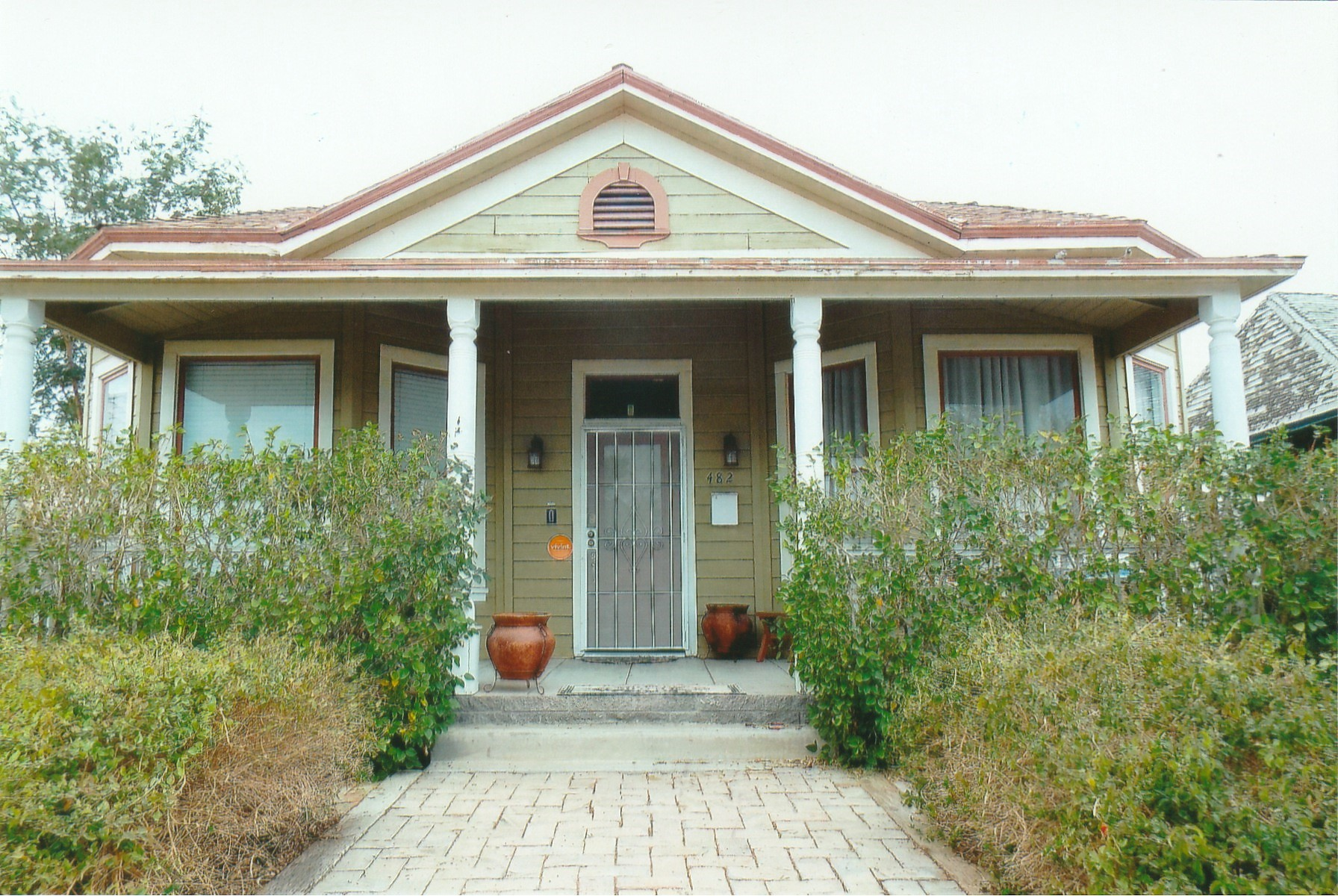
George Marable House – 1906

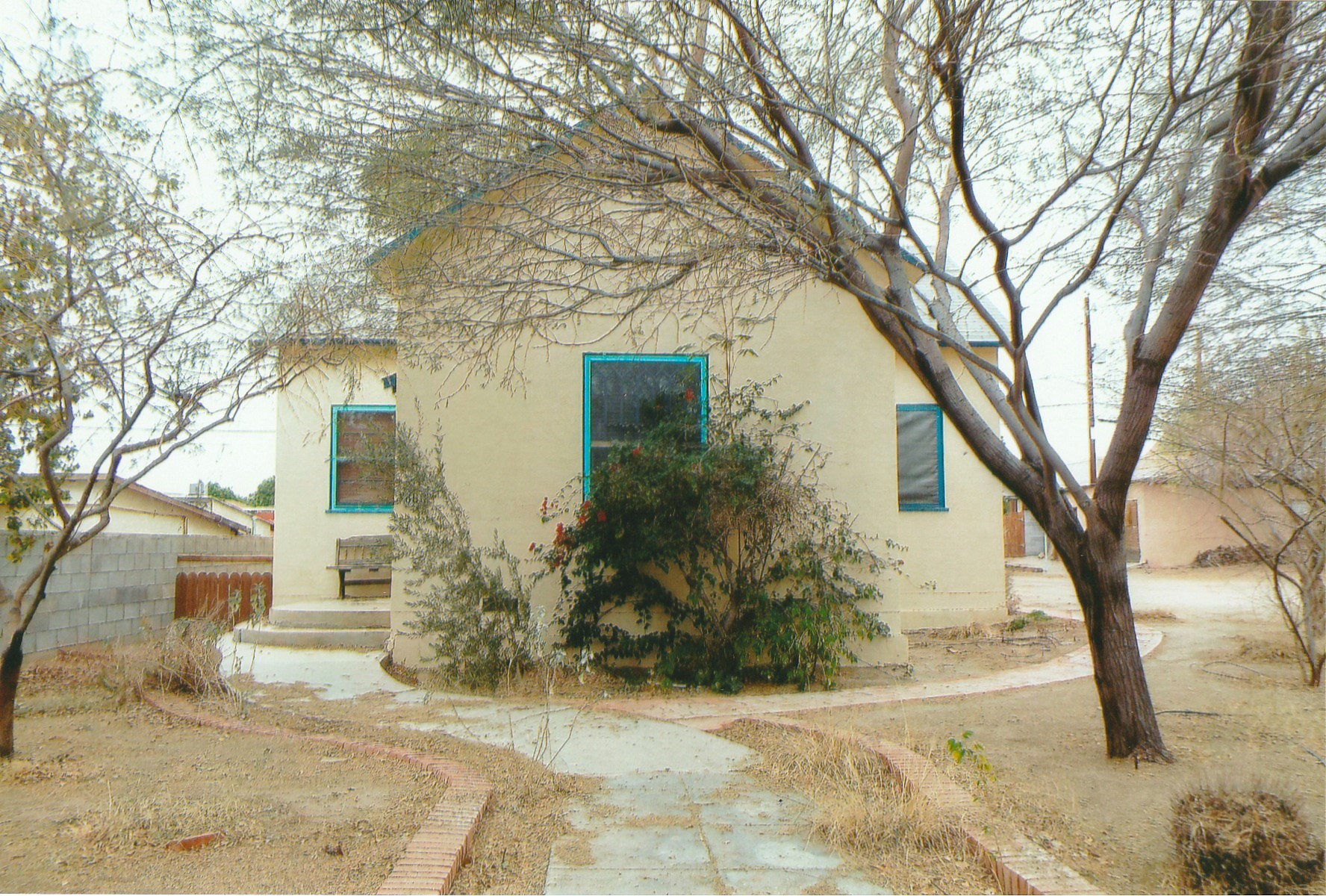
Carmelita Mayhew House – 1909

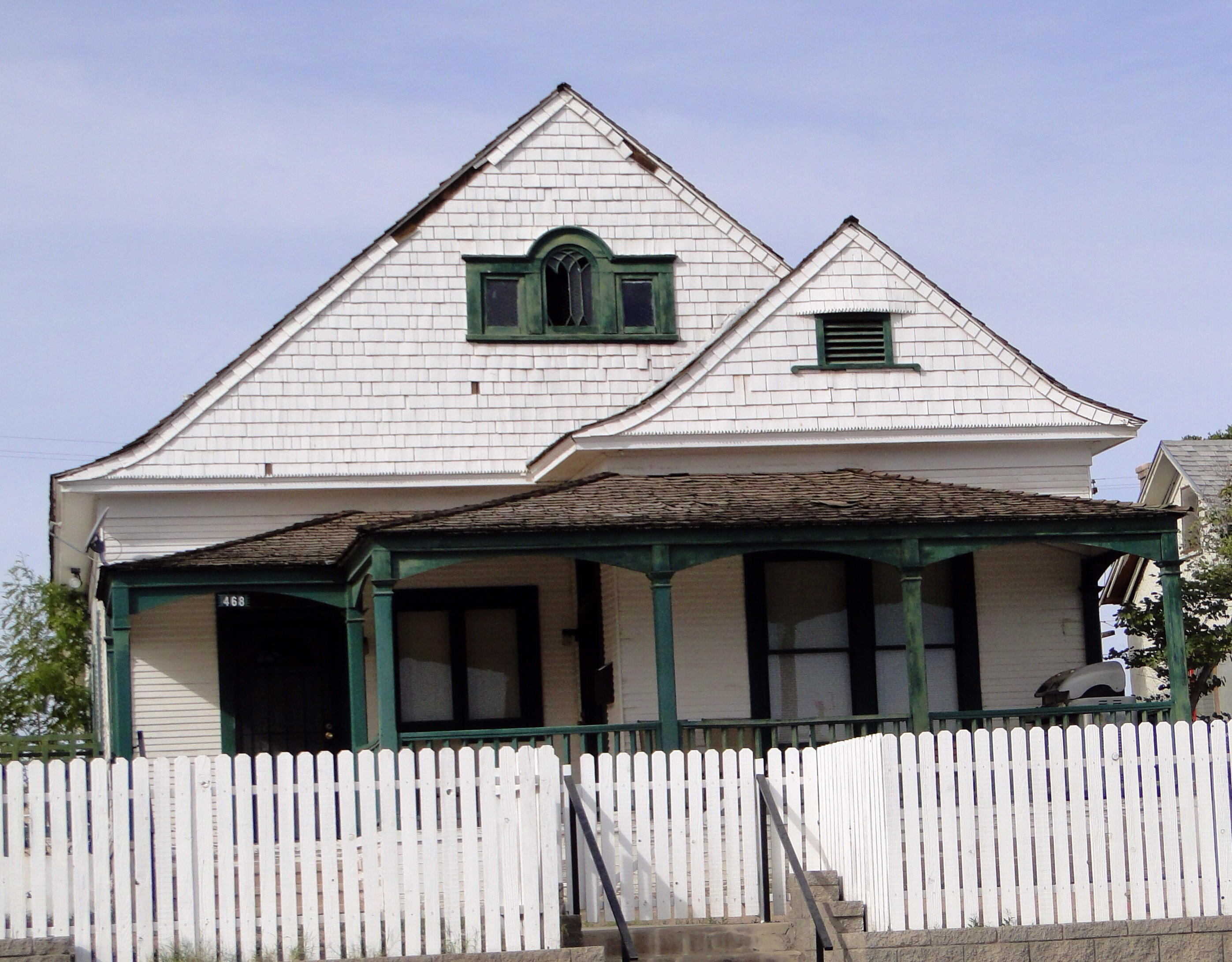
A. B. Ming House – 1906

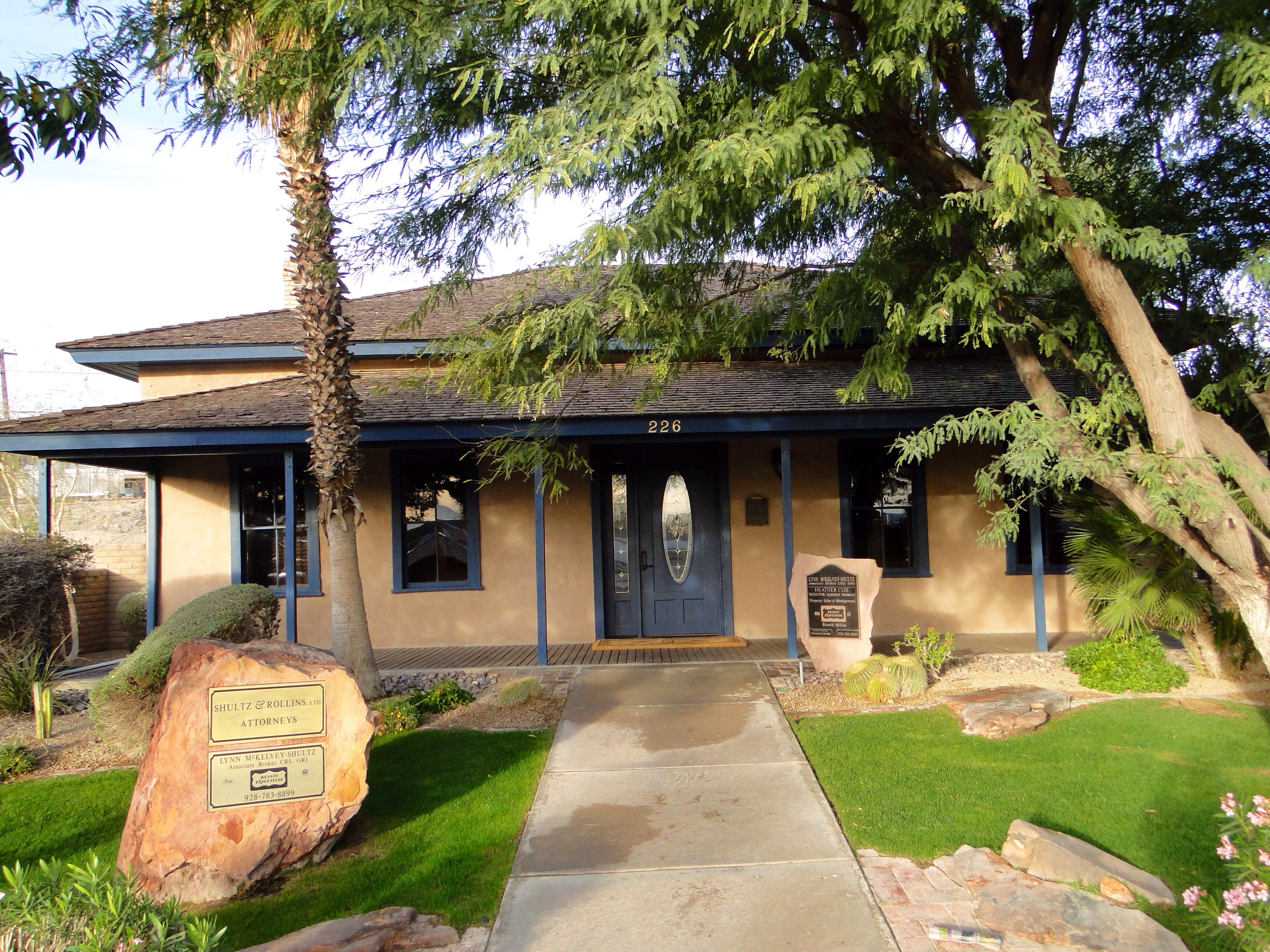
Norton House – 1894

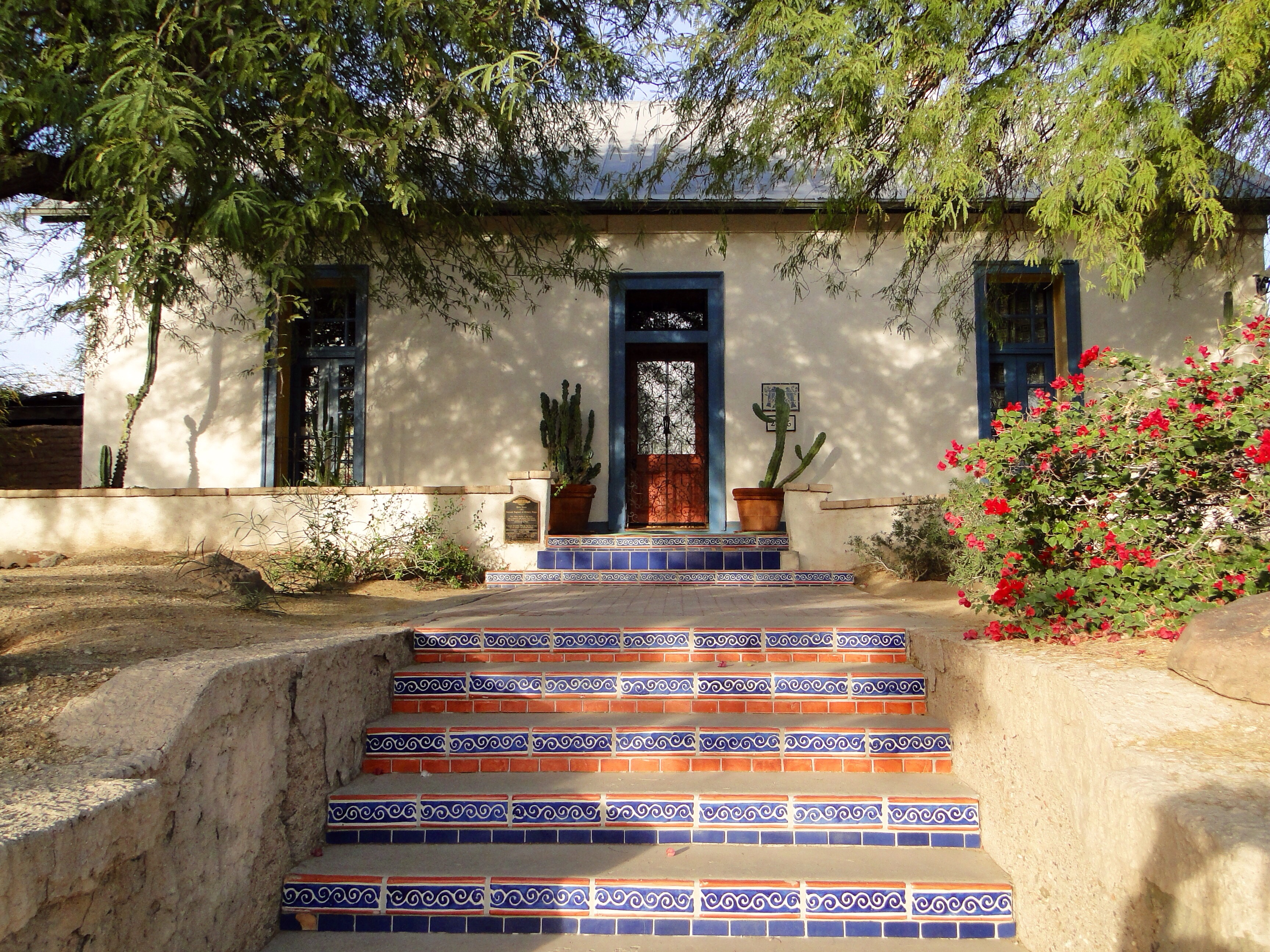
Ortiz House – 1901

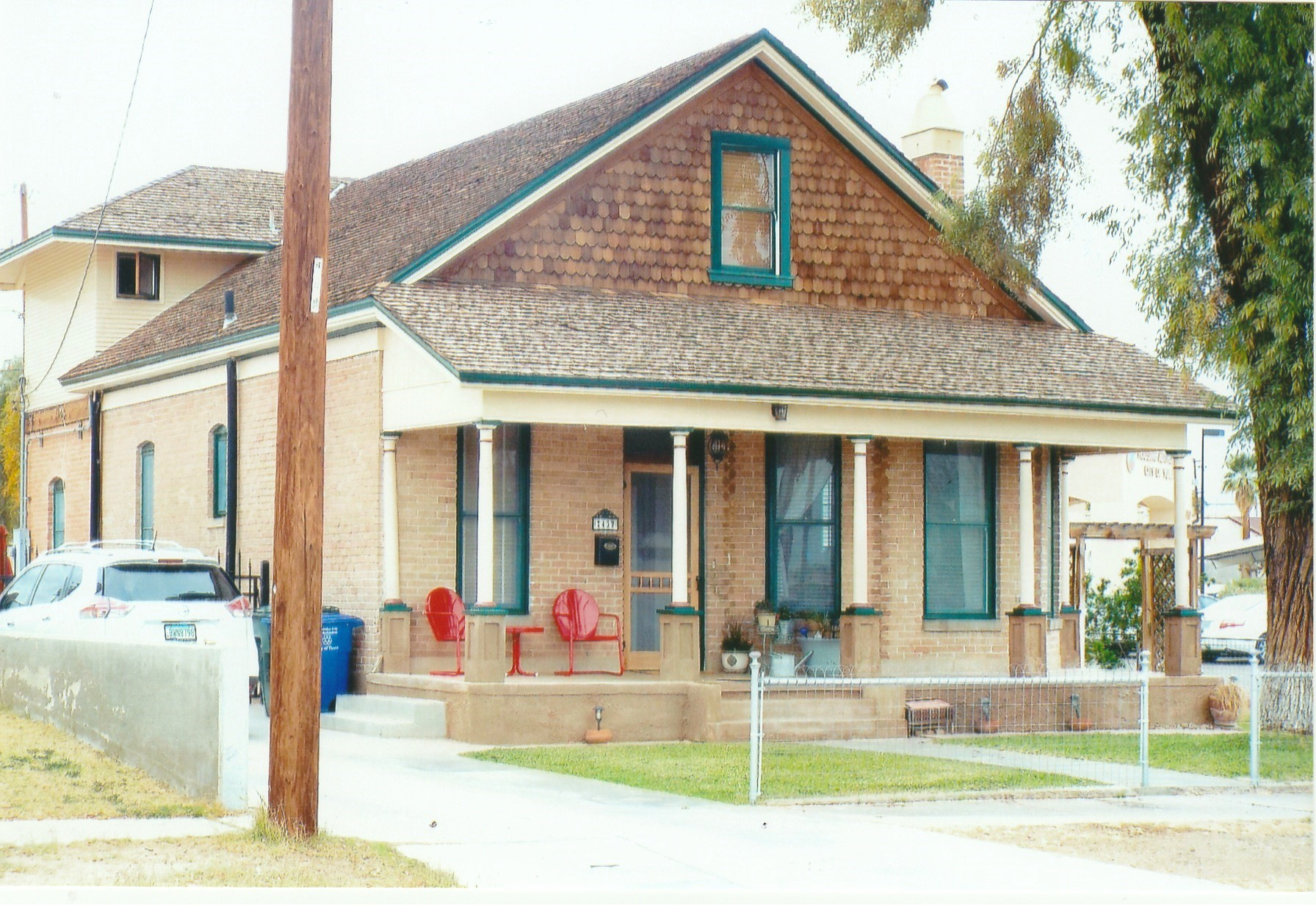
Pancrazi House – 1905

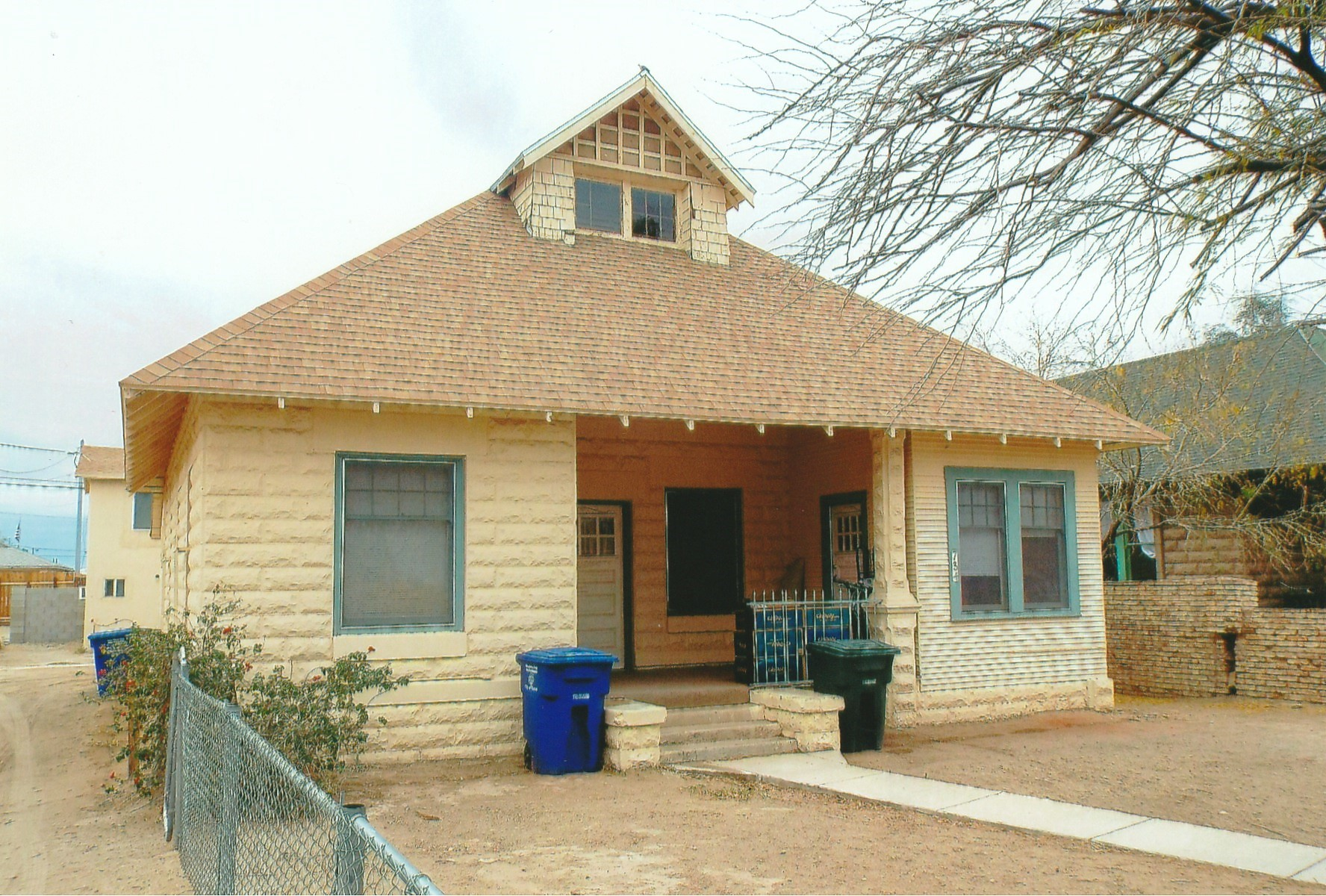
Clara Smith Riley House – 1909

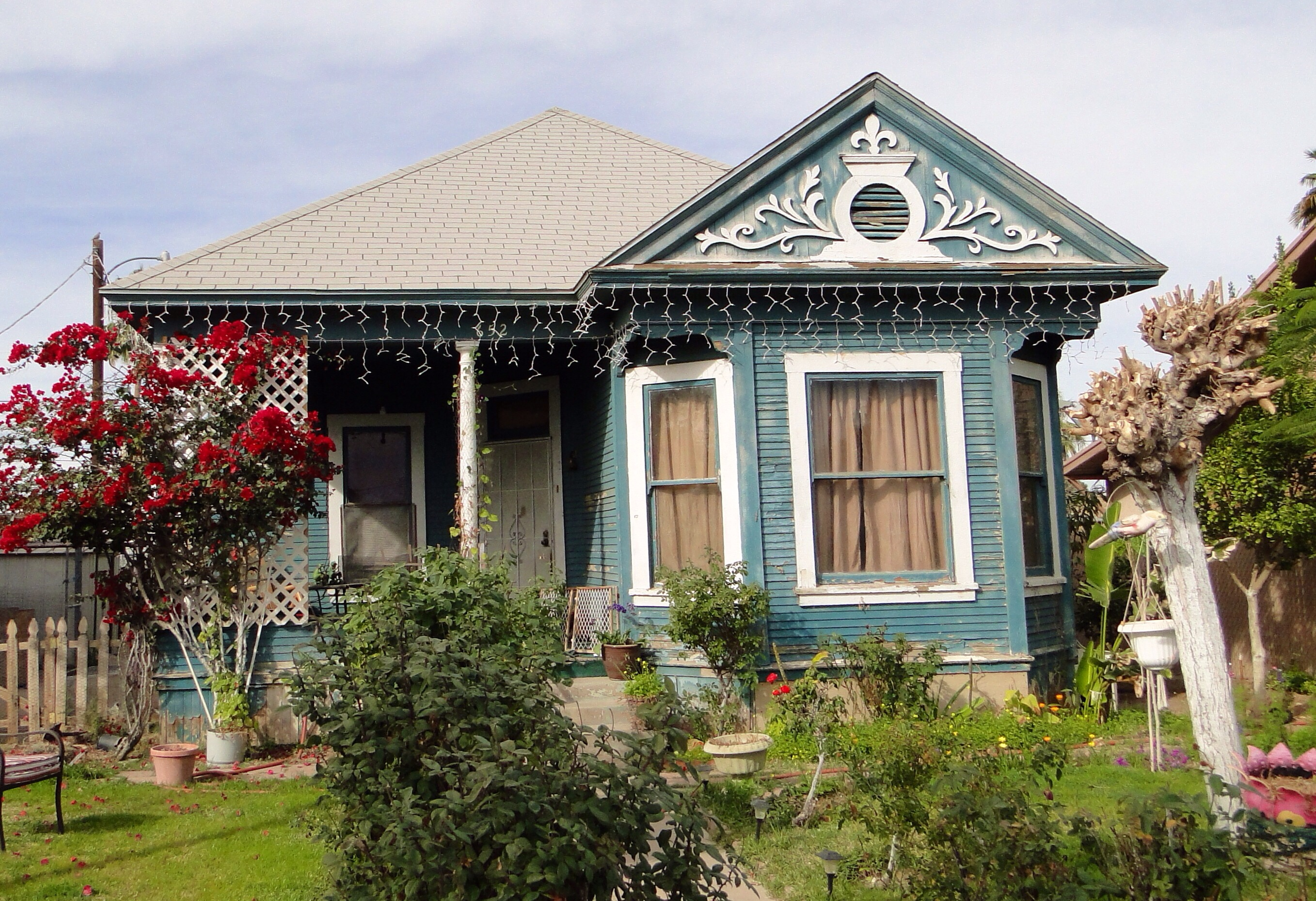
Russell-Williamson House – 1907

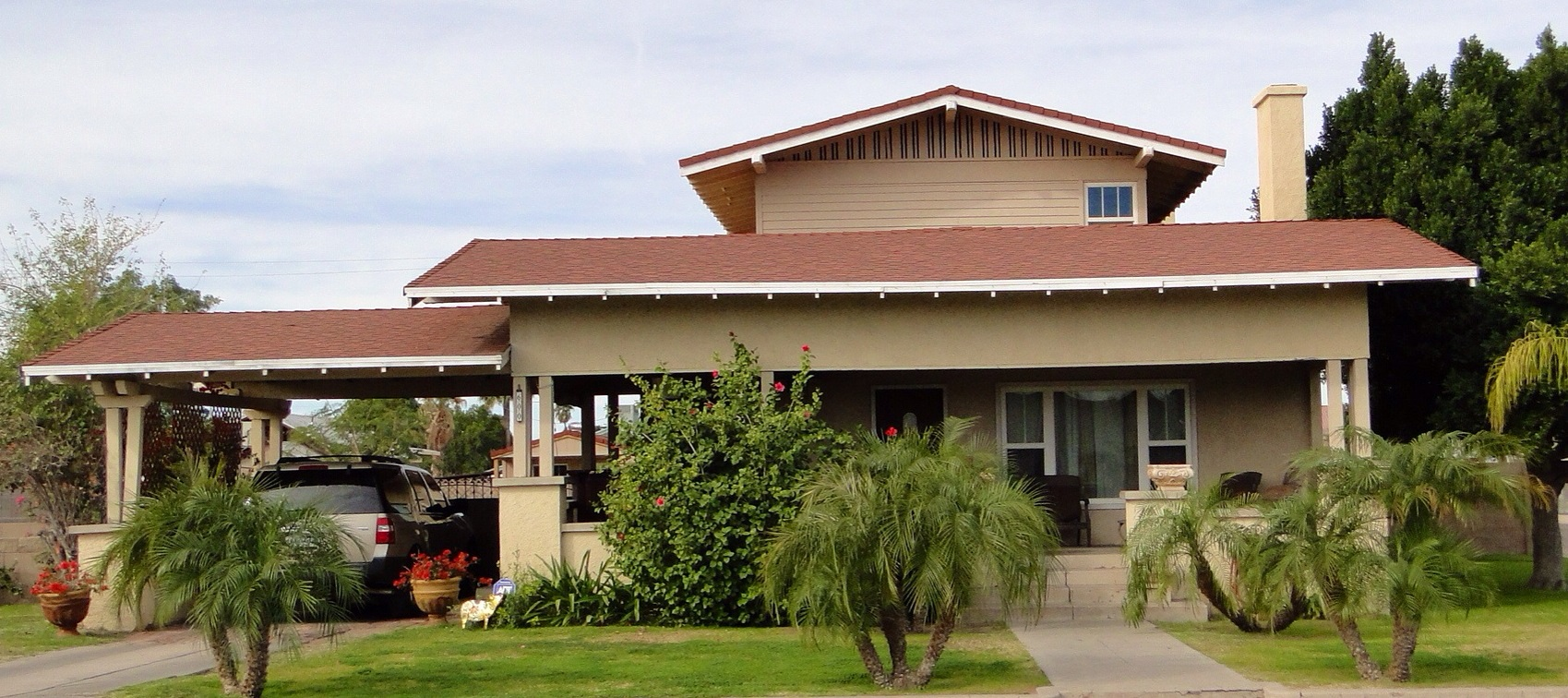
J. Homer Smith House – 1917

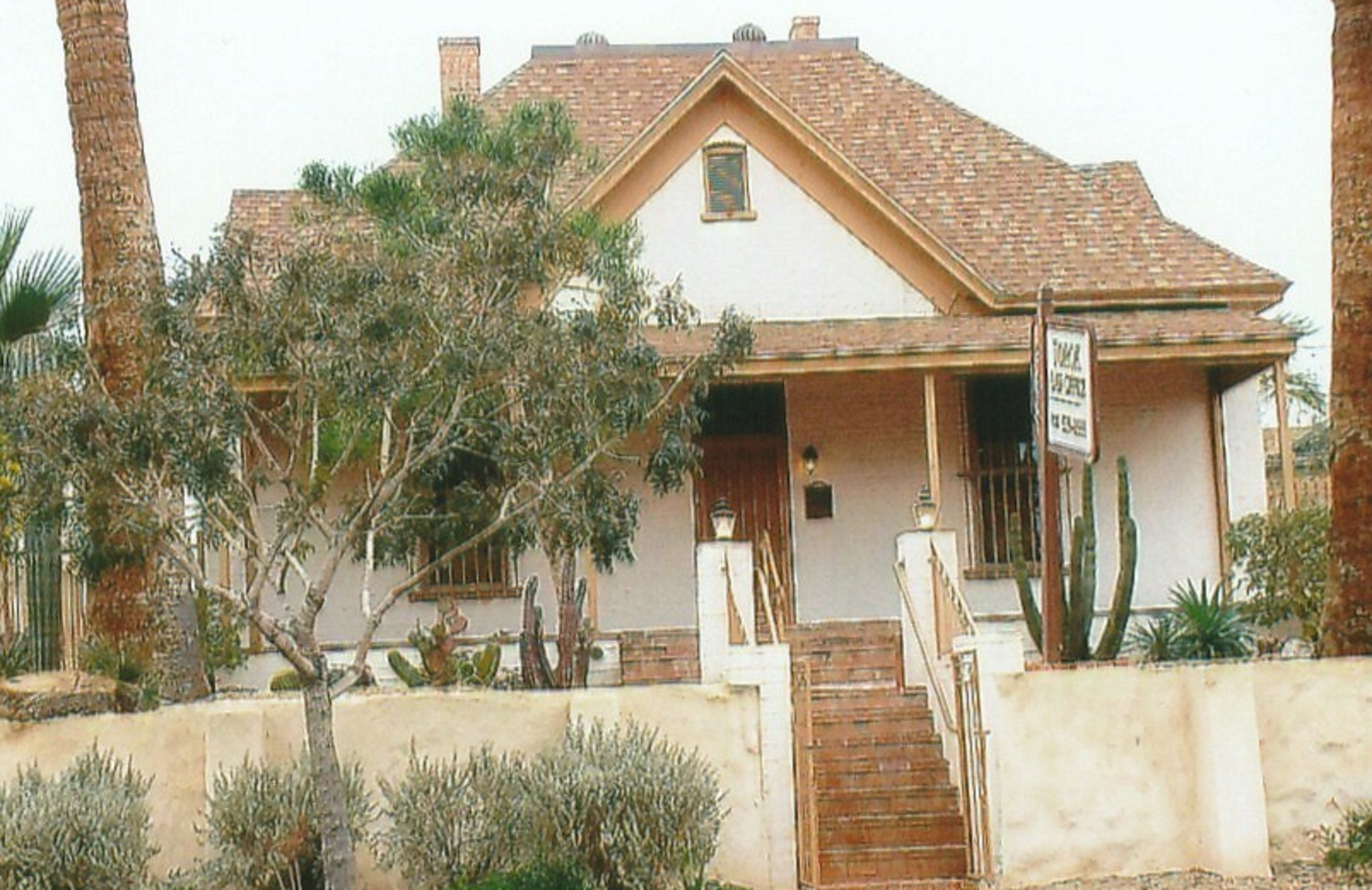
Brown House – 1893

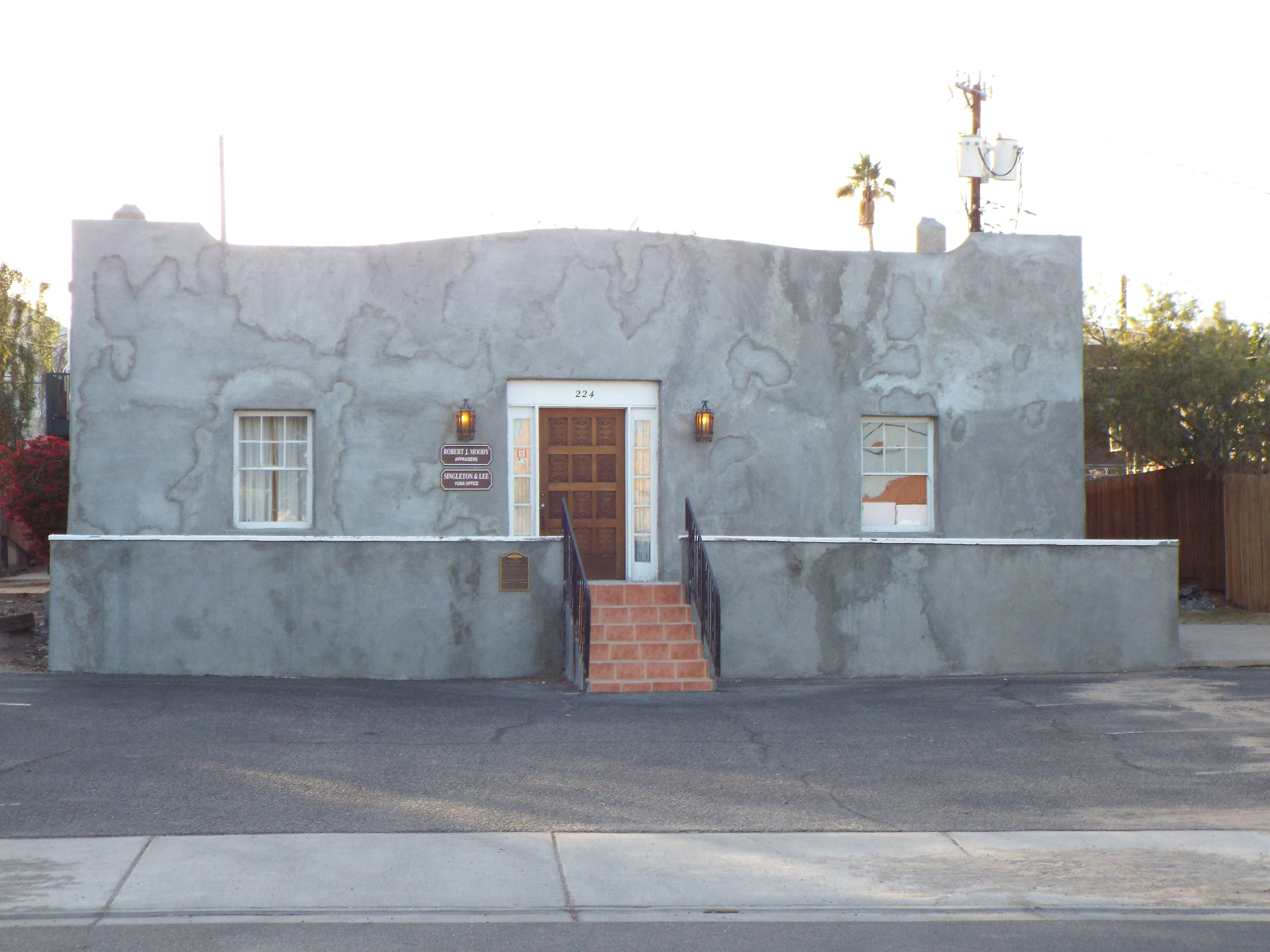
Polhamus House – 1893

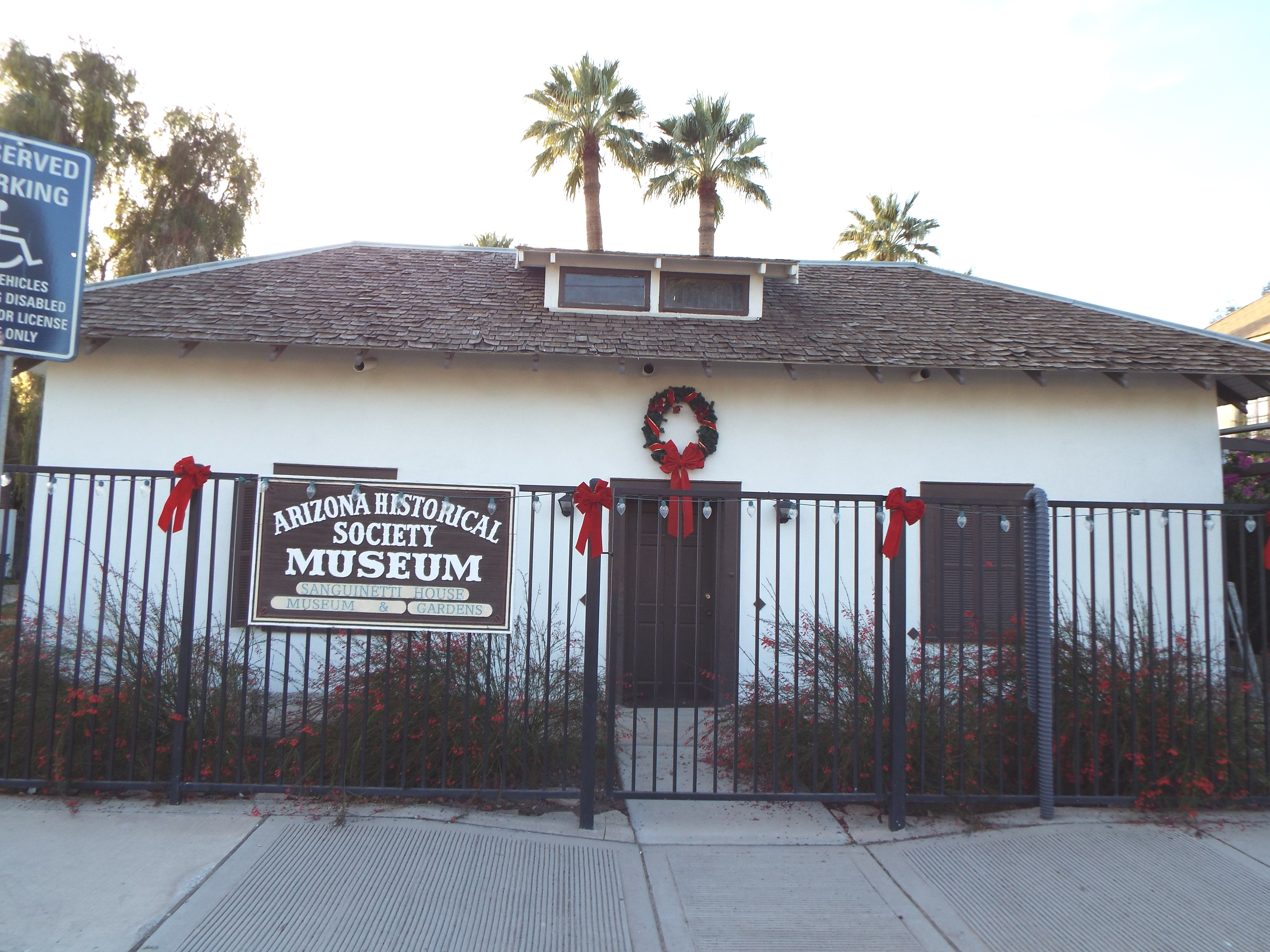
Sanguinetti House – 1870

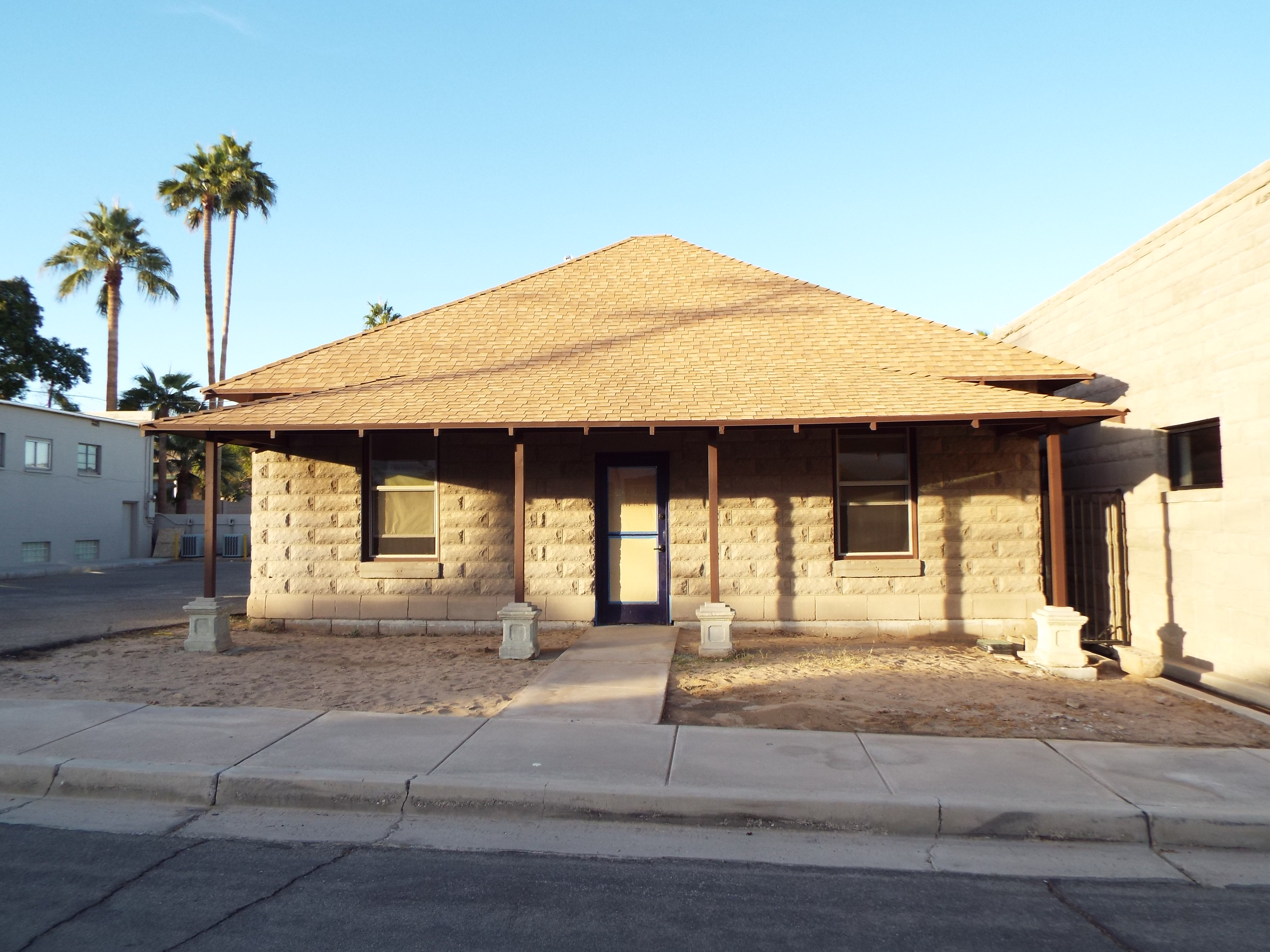
Ghiotte House – 1915

=== Yuma Pioneer Cemetery ===
The Yuma Pioneer Cemetery was established on June 24, 1895. It is located at 1415 1st, Avenue. Among those who are interred in the cemetery is Jack Swilling. the founder of Phoenix. He is buried in the Hodges family cemetery plot.

Yuma Pioneer Cemetery
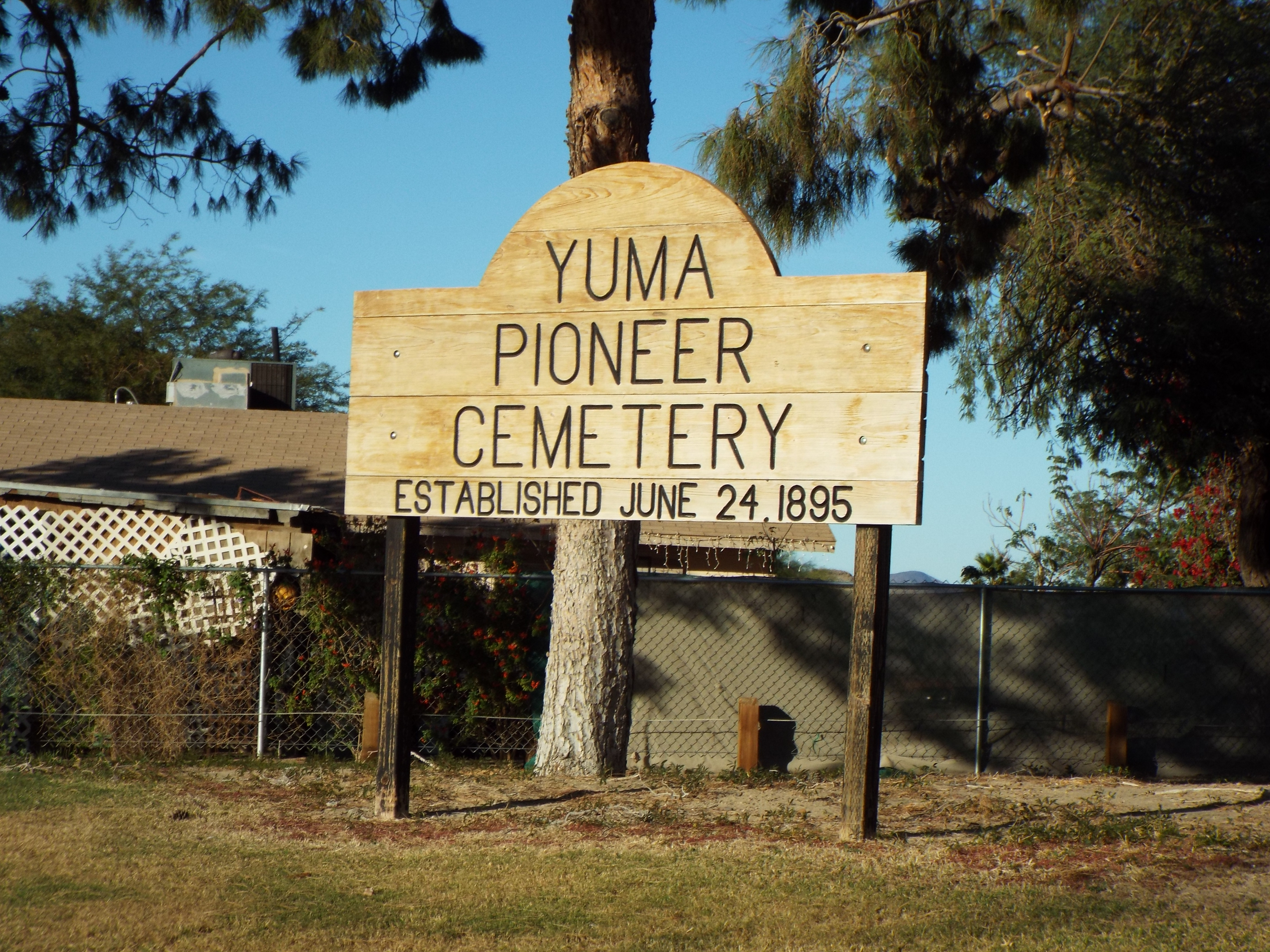
Yuma Pioneer Cemetery – 1895.

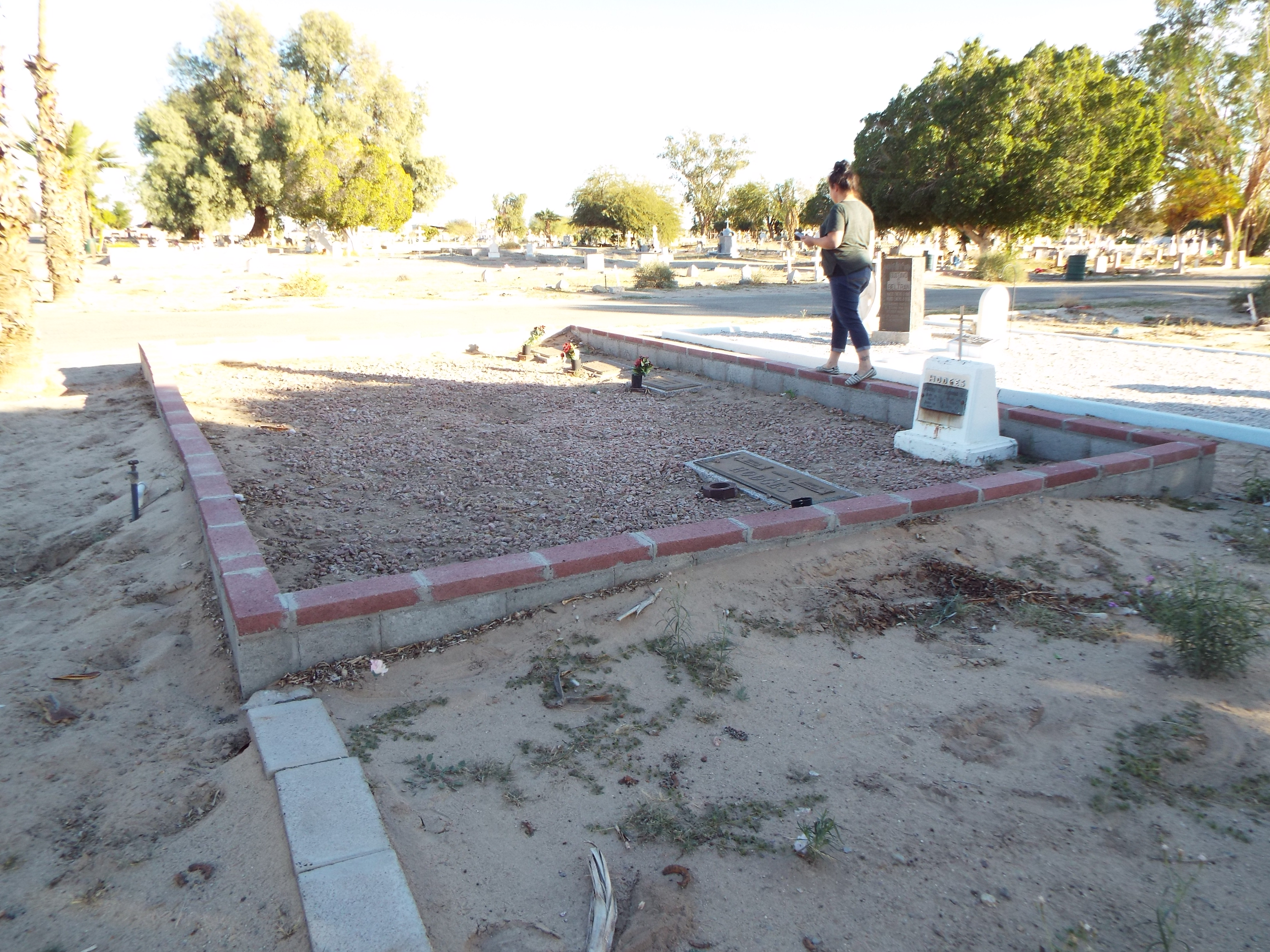
Hodges family plot where Jack Swilling is buried.

=== Yuma Territorial Prison ===
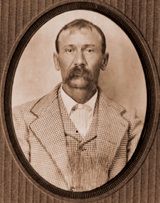
Outlaw Bill Downing

The Yuma Territorial Prison was a prison built by prisoners in 1875. The prison opened while Arizona was still a U.S. territory. Conditions in the prison were harsh. Some prisoners had to sleep in steel bunkbeds. The prison also has a "Dark Room" in which some prisoners were sent for solitary confinement as a form of punishment. During the next 33 years, 3,069 prisoners were incarcerated there, including 29 women. Among the notable prisoners was Jack Swilling, a.k.a. the "Father of Phoenix", who was accused and incarcerated for a crime that he did not commit. Swilling died in the prison in 1878. Also, among those incarcerated were:

- Burt Alvord – Cochise County lawman and train robber
- Bill Downing – Notorious outlaw and train robber
- William J. Flake – Mormon pioneer imprisoned for violating the Edmunds Act
- Pearl Hart – stagecoach robber
- "Buckskin Frank" Leslie – gunfighter and killer of Billy Claiborne
- Ricardo Flores Magón – Mexican revolutionary, founder of the Partido Liberal Mexicano
- Pete Spence – outlaw involved in the Earp-Clanton feud

The prison is one of the Yuma Crossing and Associated Sites on the National Register of Historic Places in the Yuma Crossing National Heritage Area. The site is now operated as a historical museum by Arizona State Parks as Yuma Territorial Prison State Historic Park.

Yuma Territorial Prison

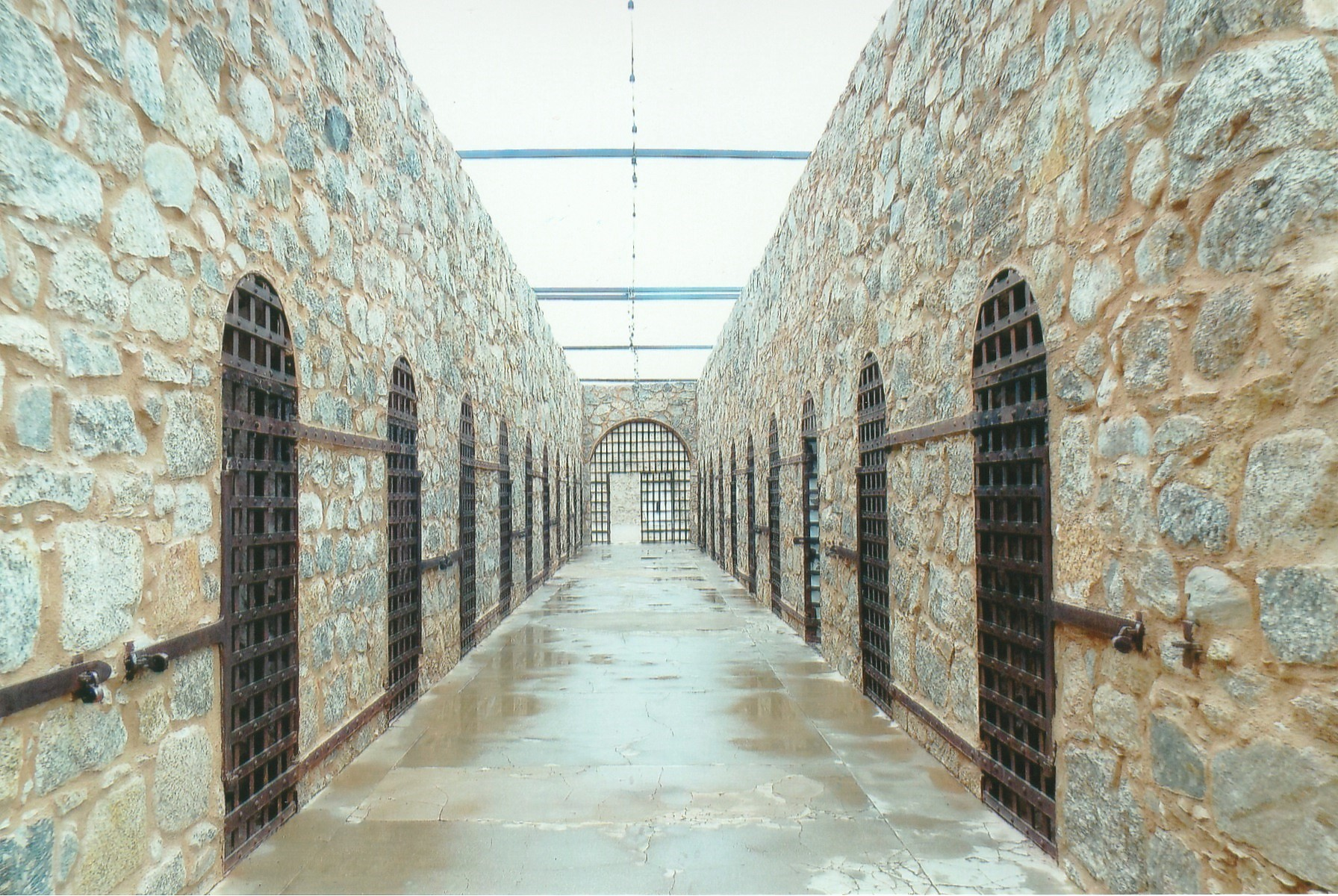
Yuma Territorial Prison

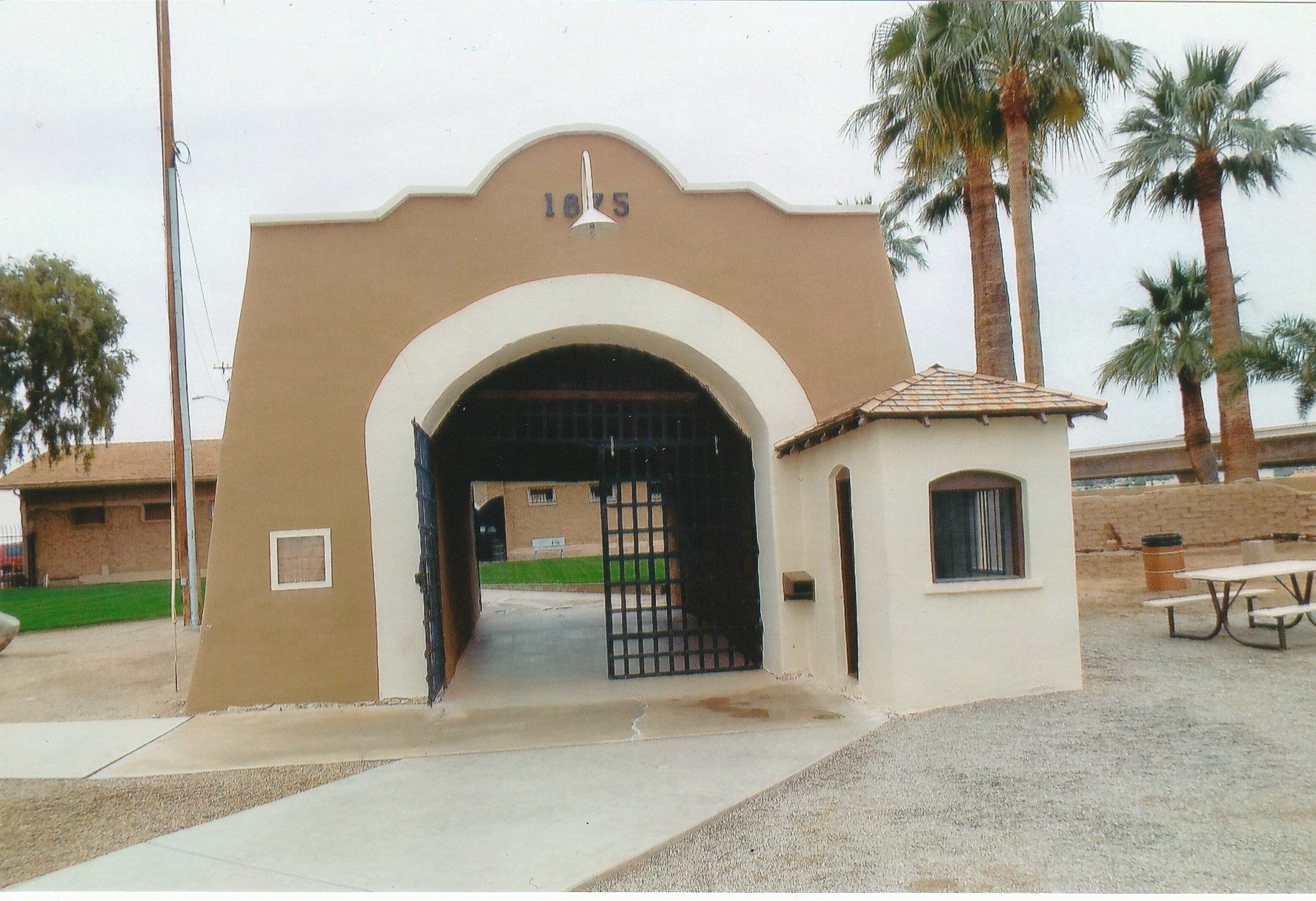
Prison main entrance.

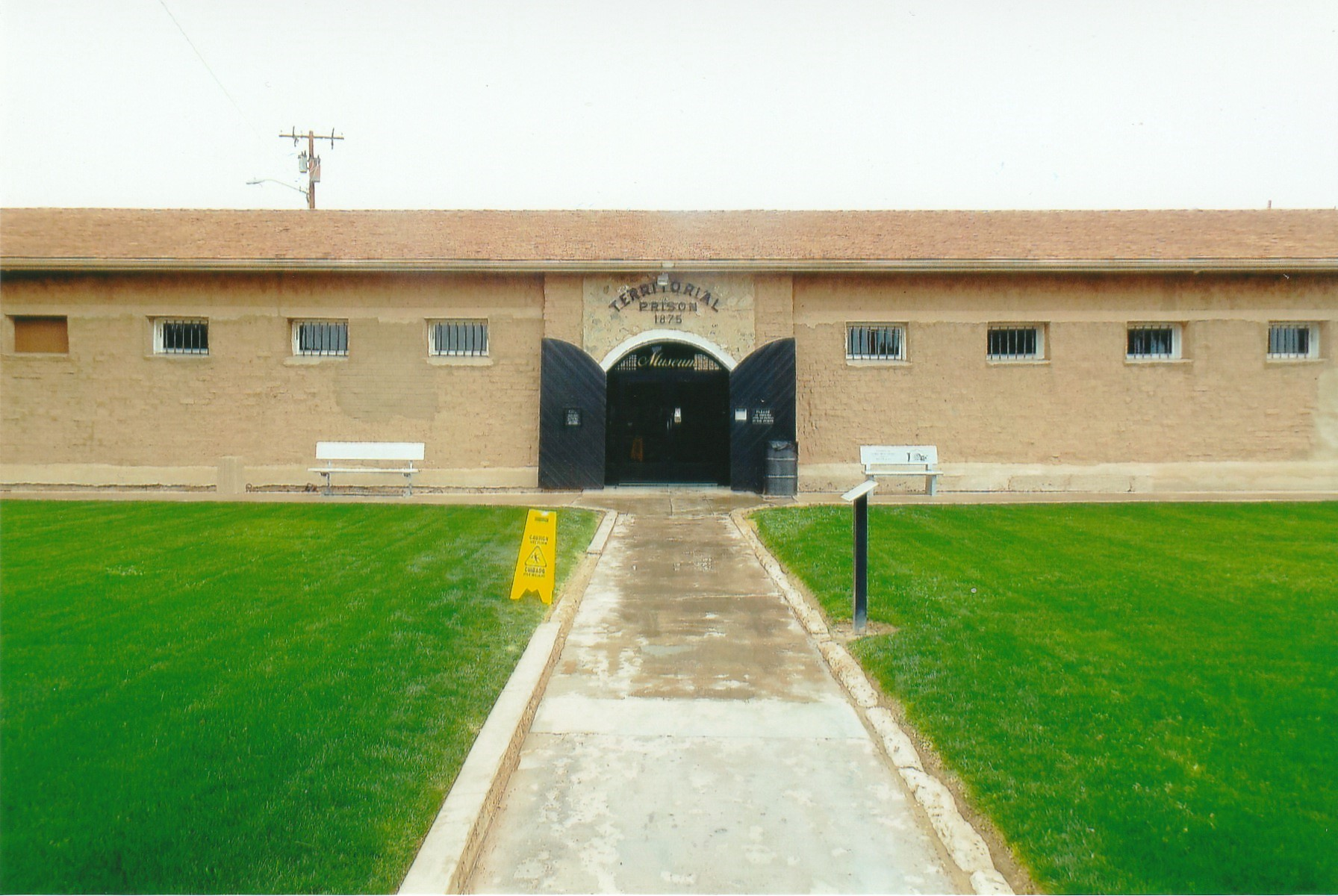
Main building now used as a museum.

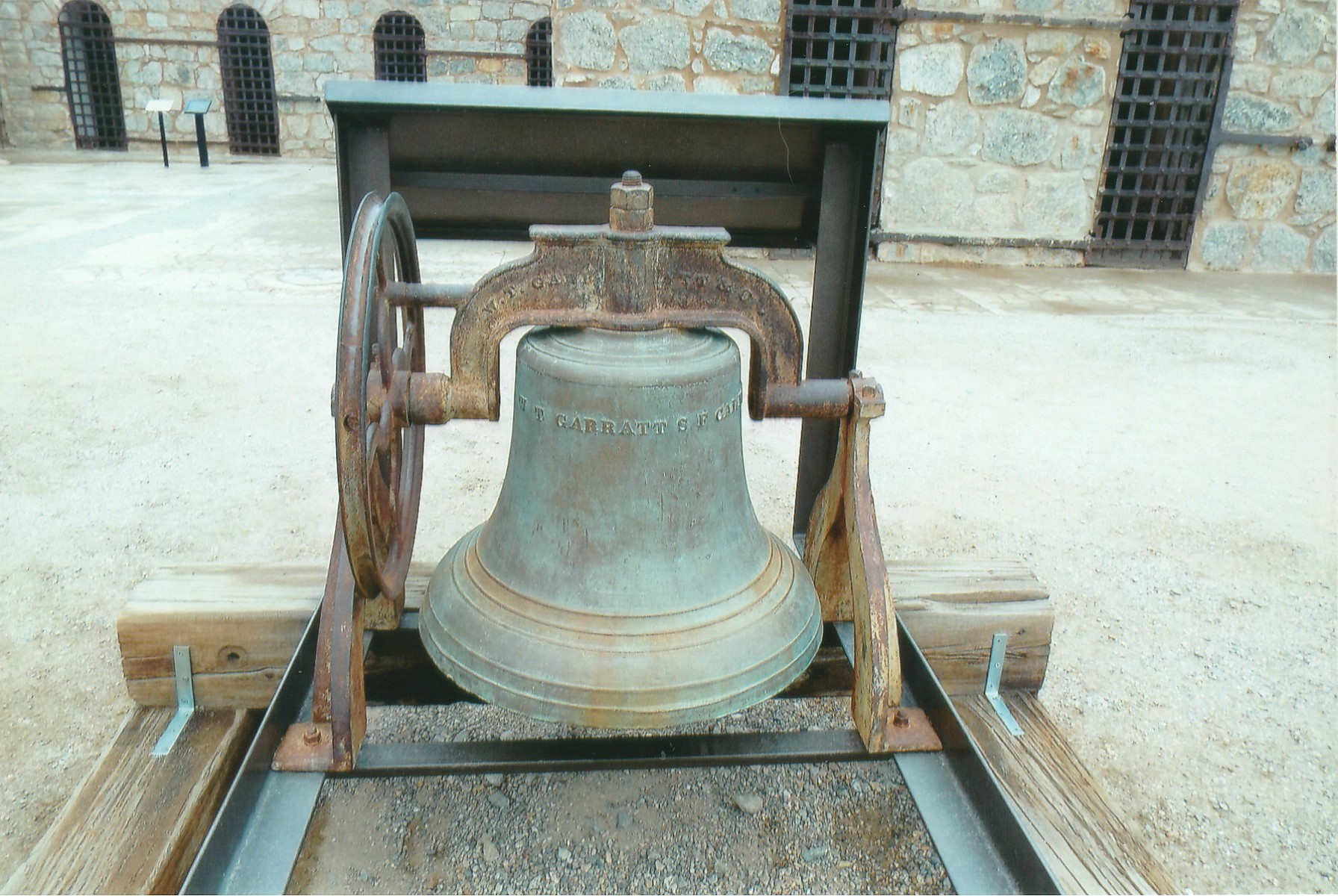
Prison bell cast in 1875.

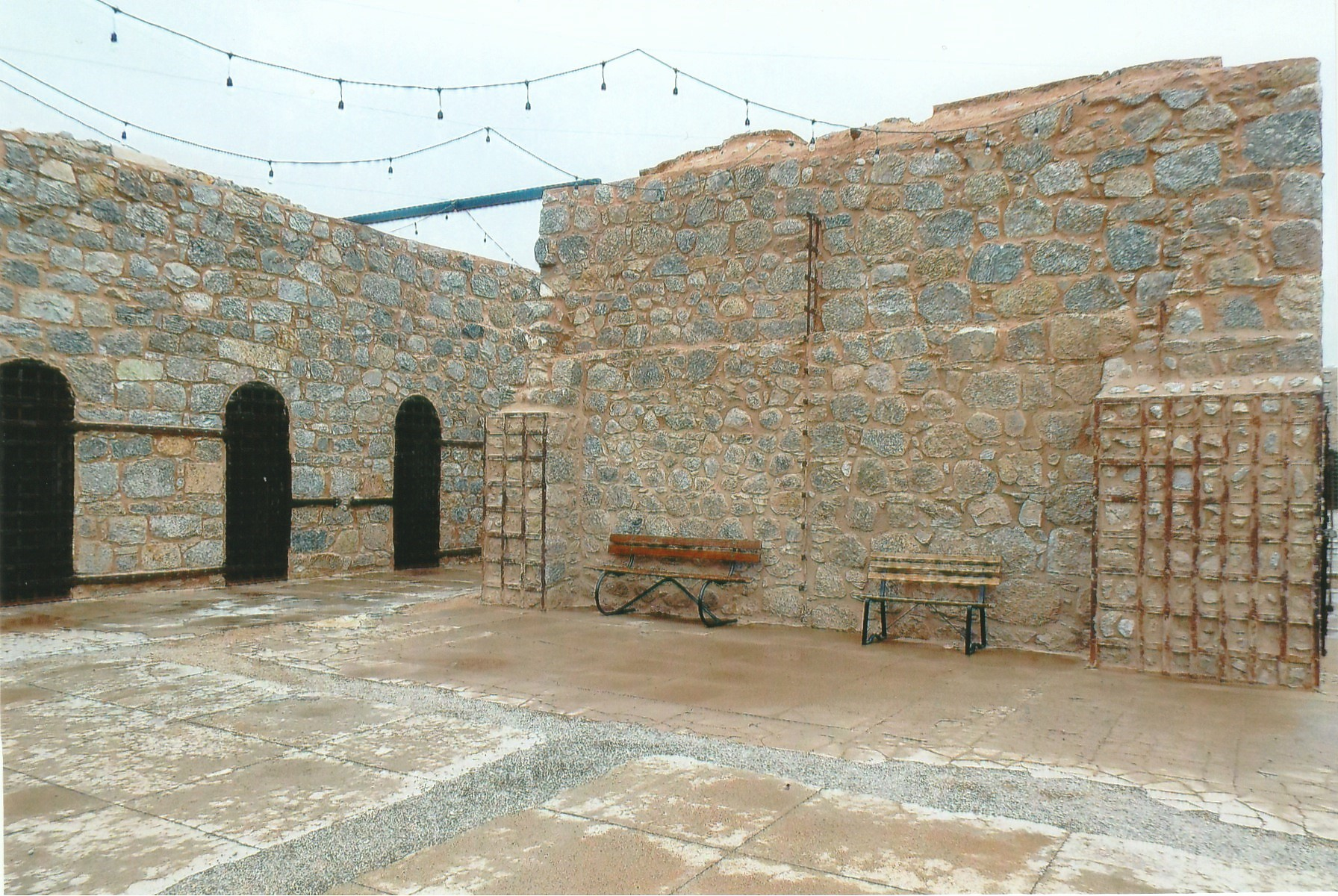
Prison front yard.

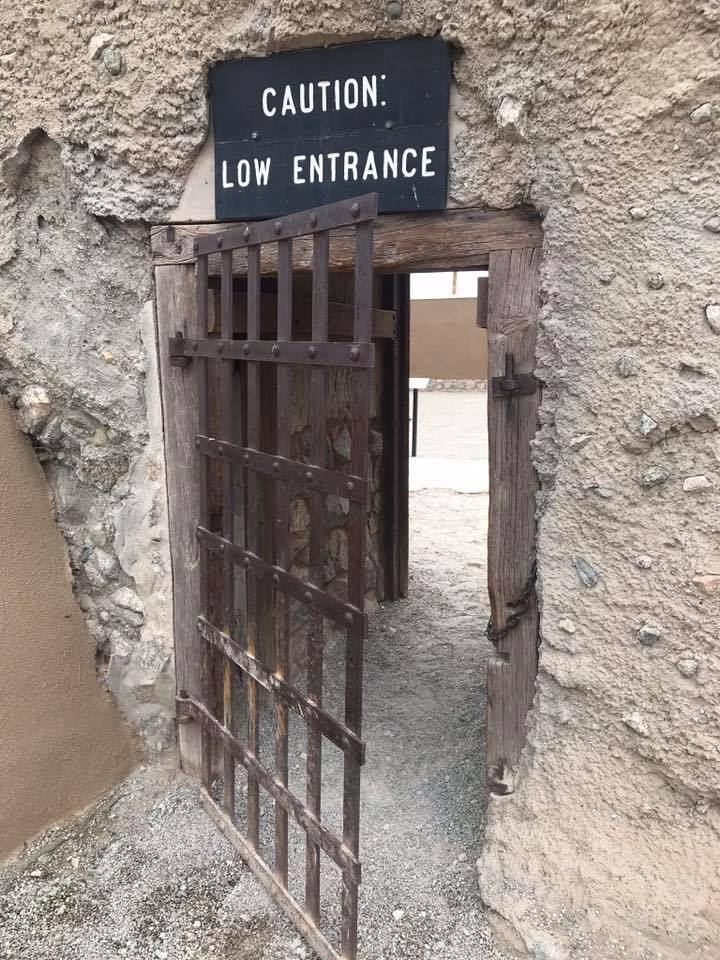
Cell gate.

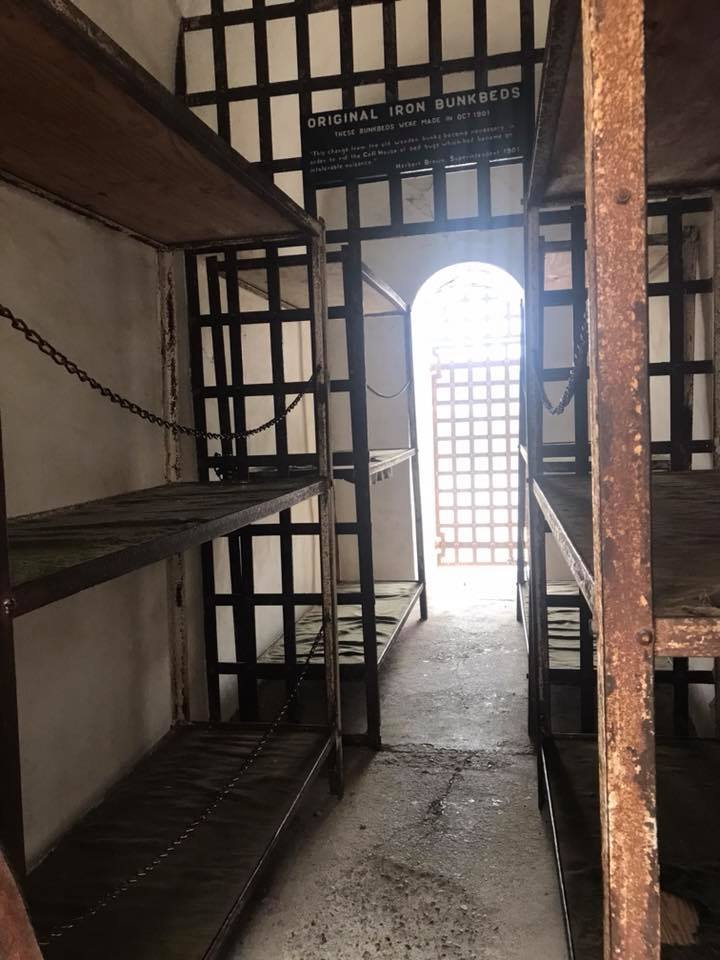
Prisoners slept on steel bunkers.

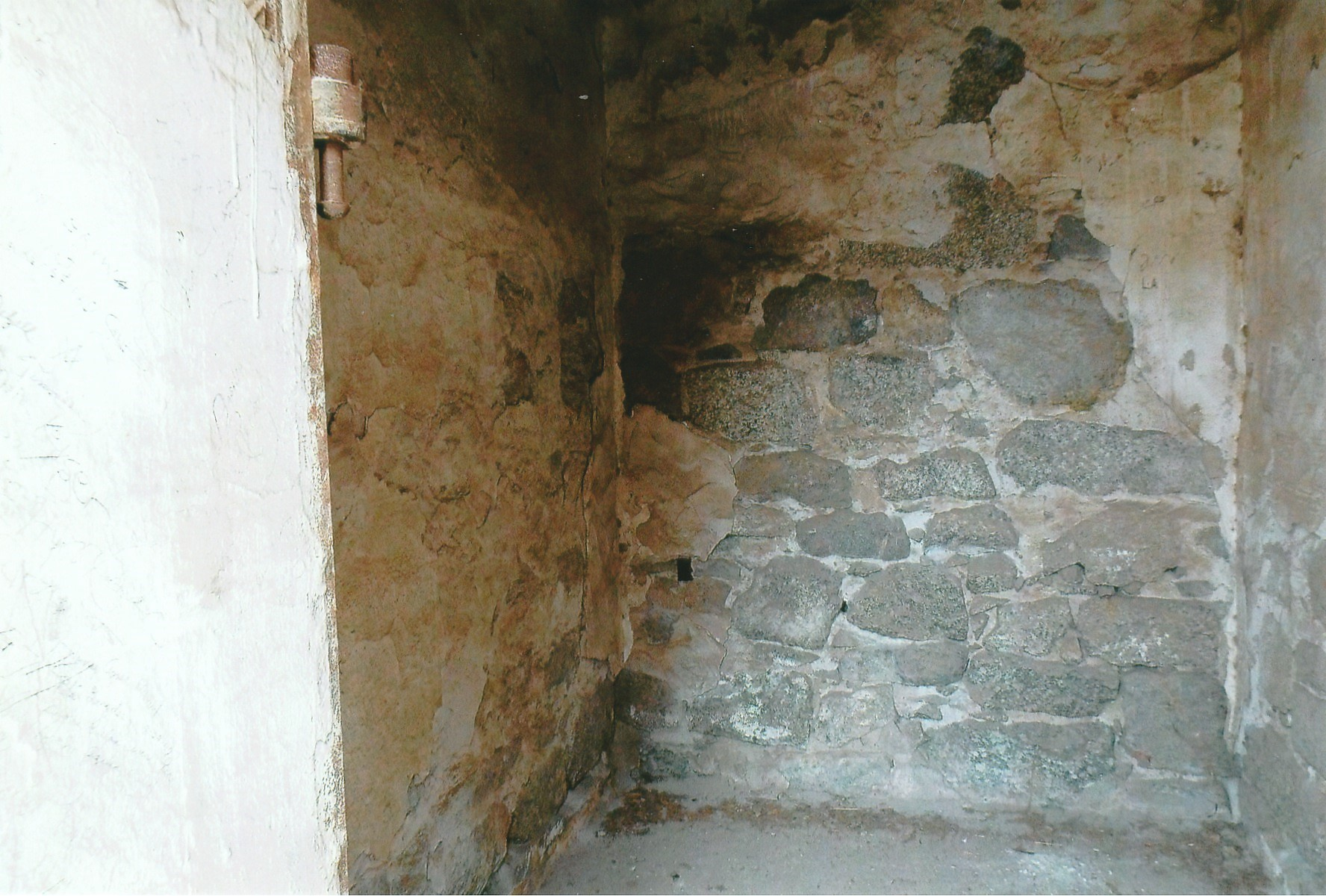
Inside a cell.

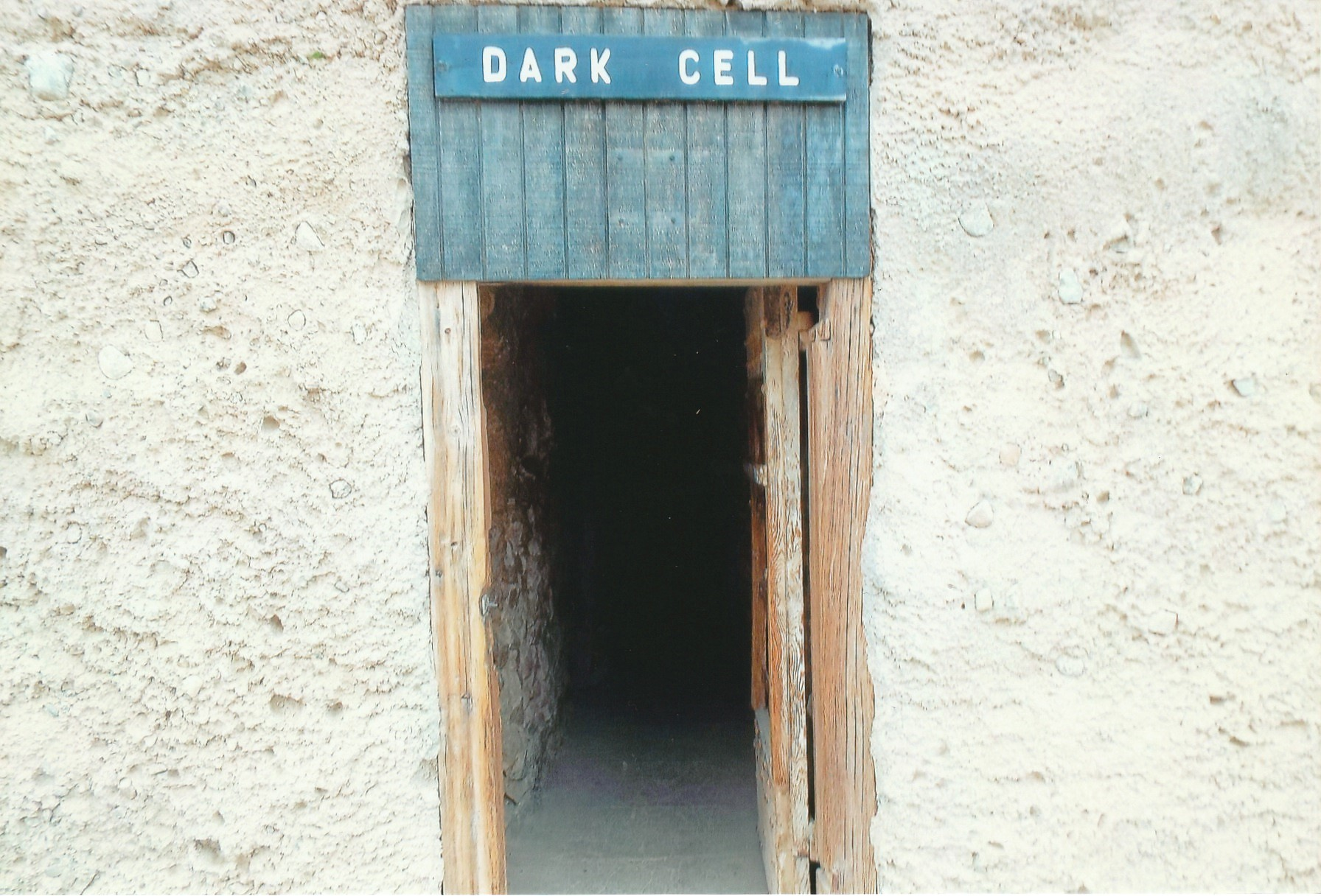
The "Dark Room".

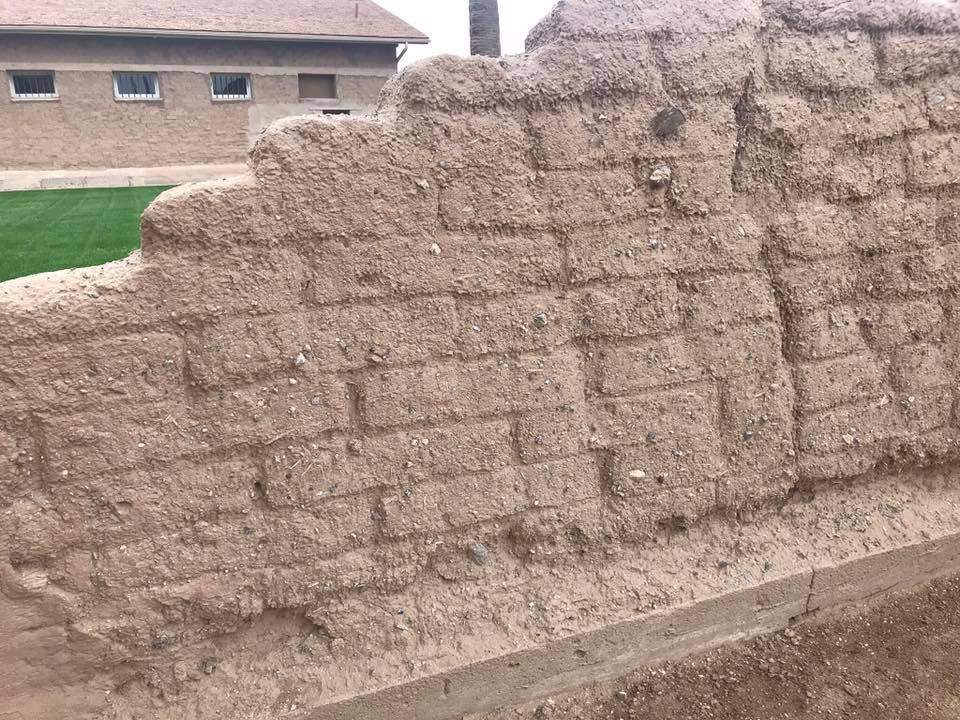
Prison ruins.

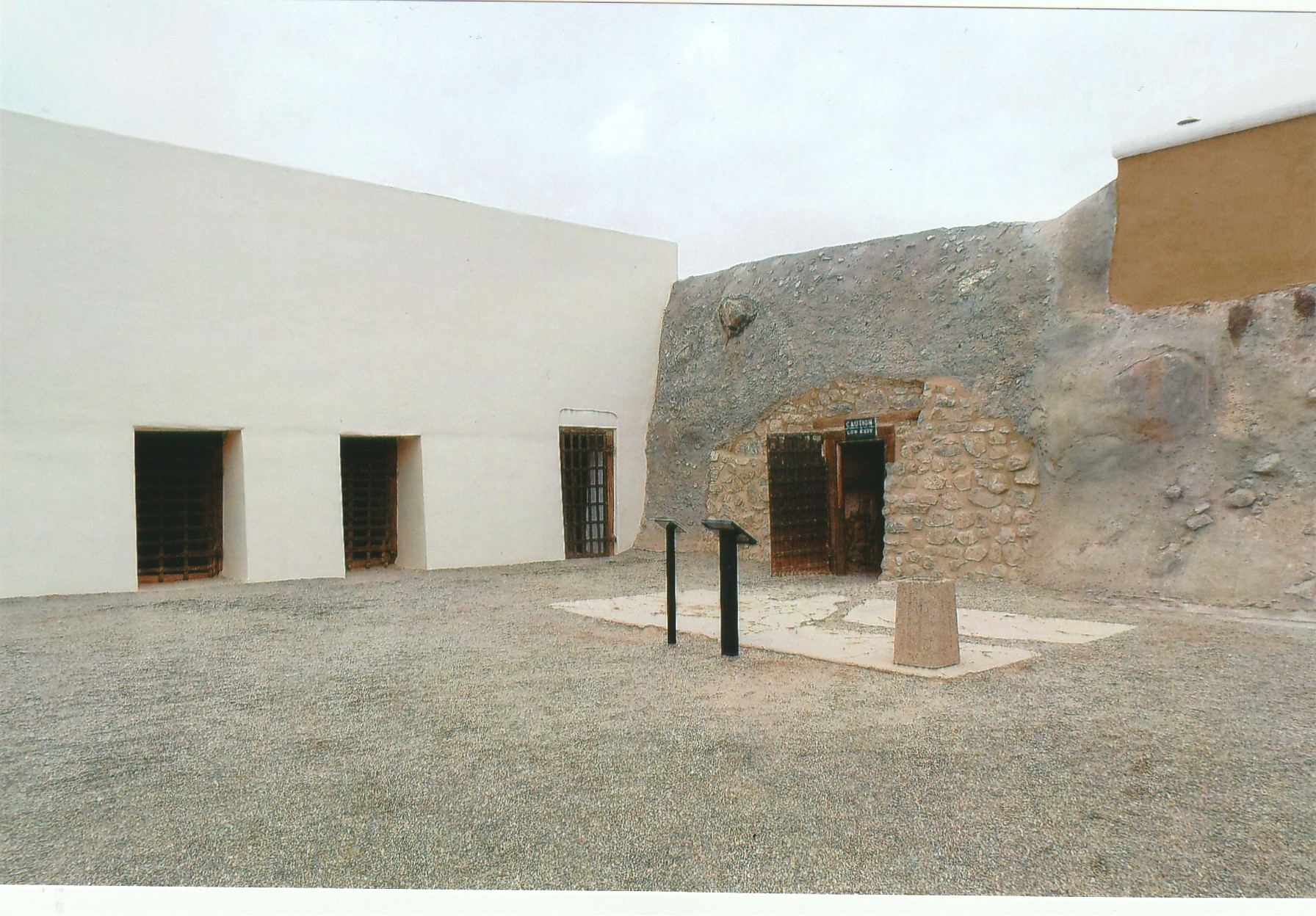
Prison backyard.

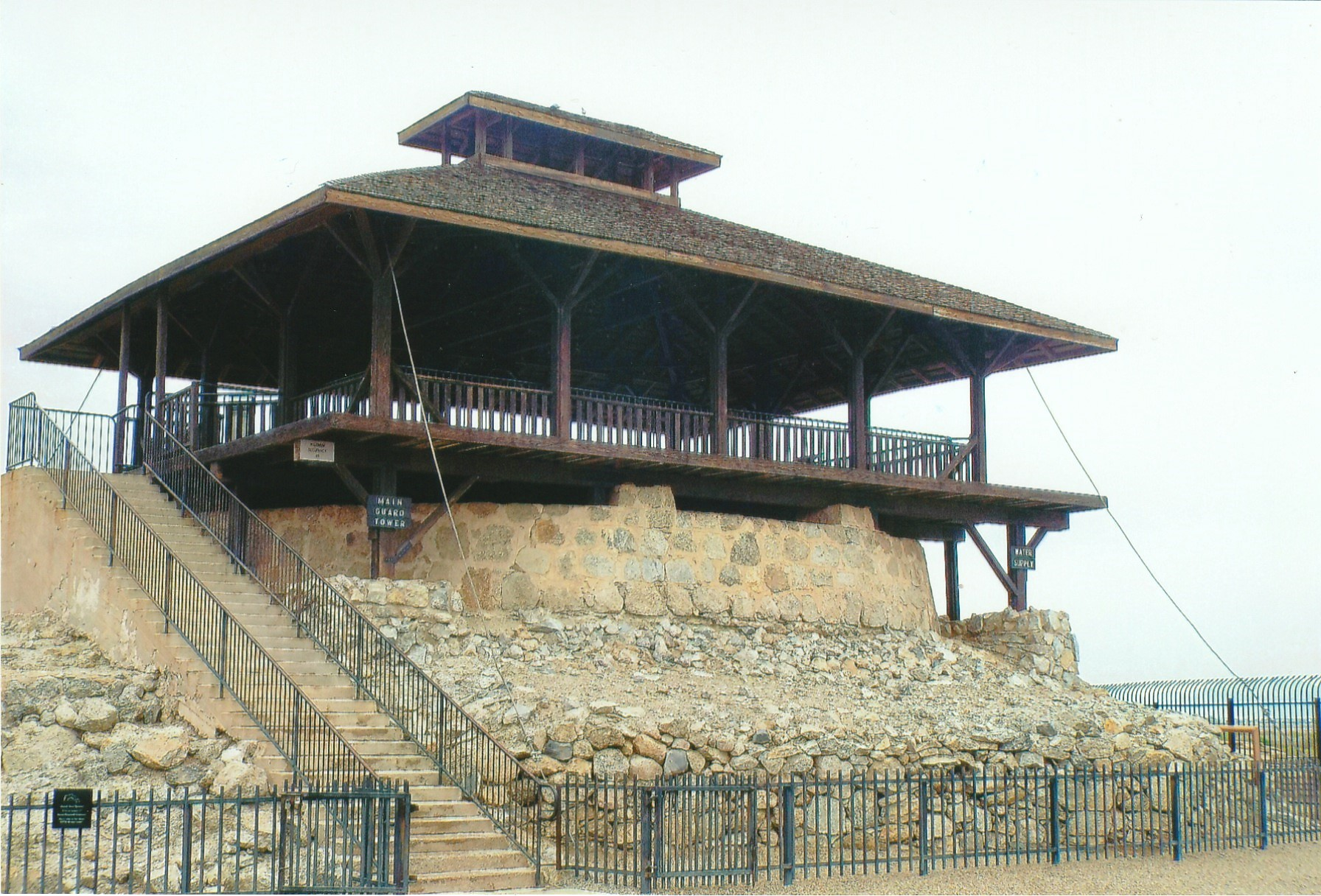
Guard house.

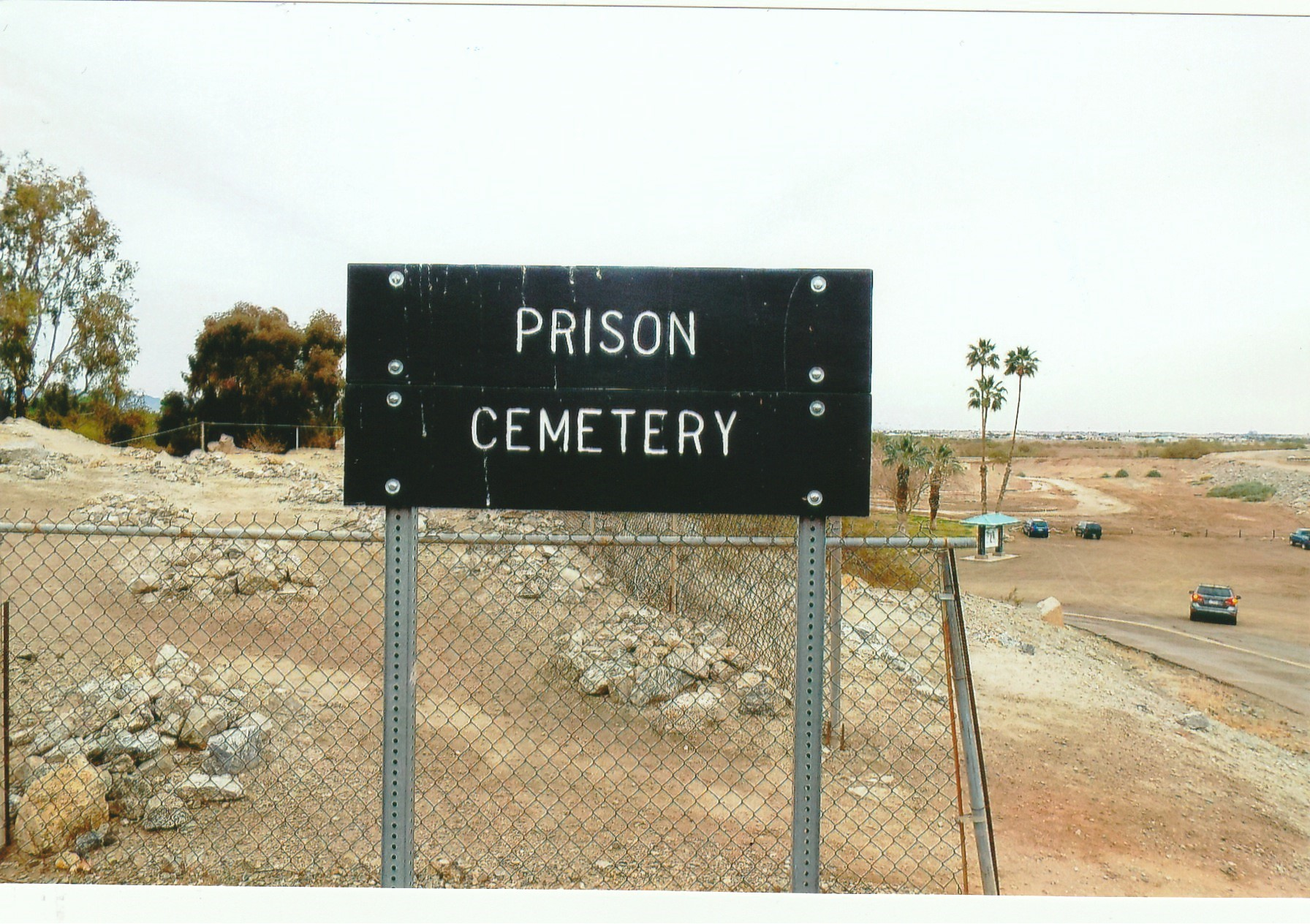
Prison Cemetery.

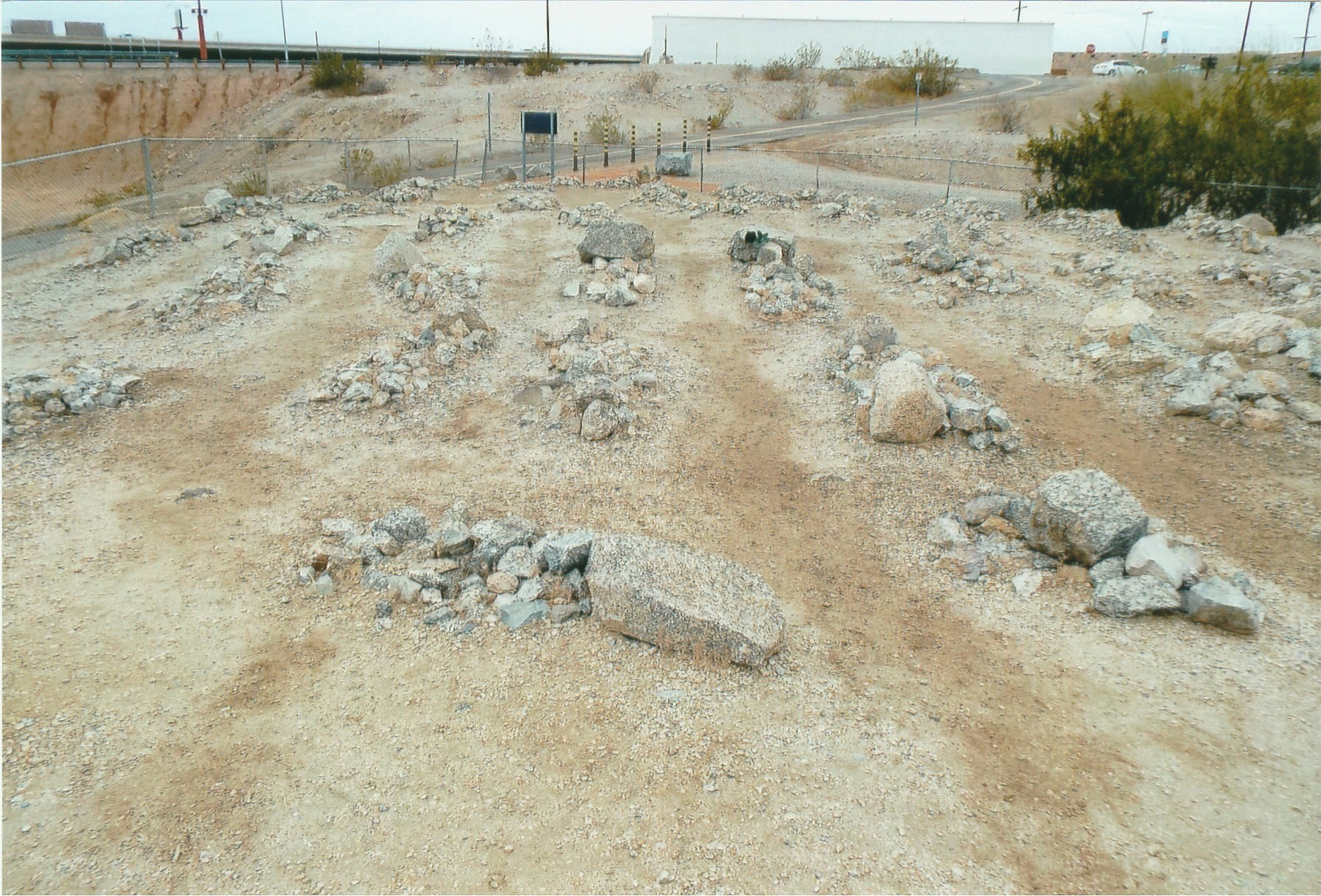
Graves of prisoners.

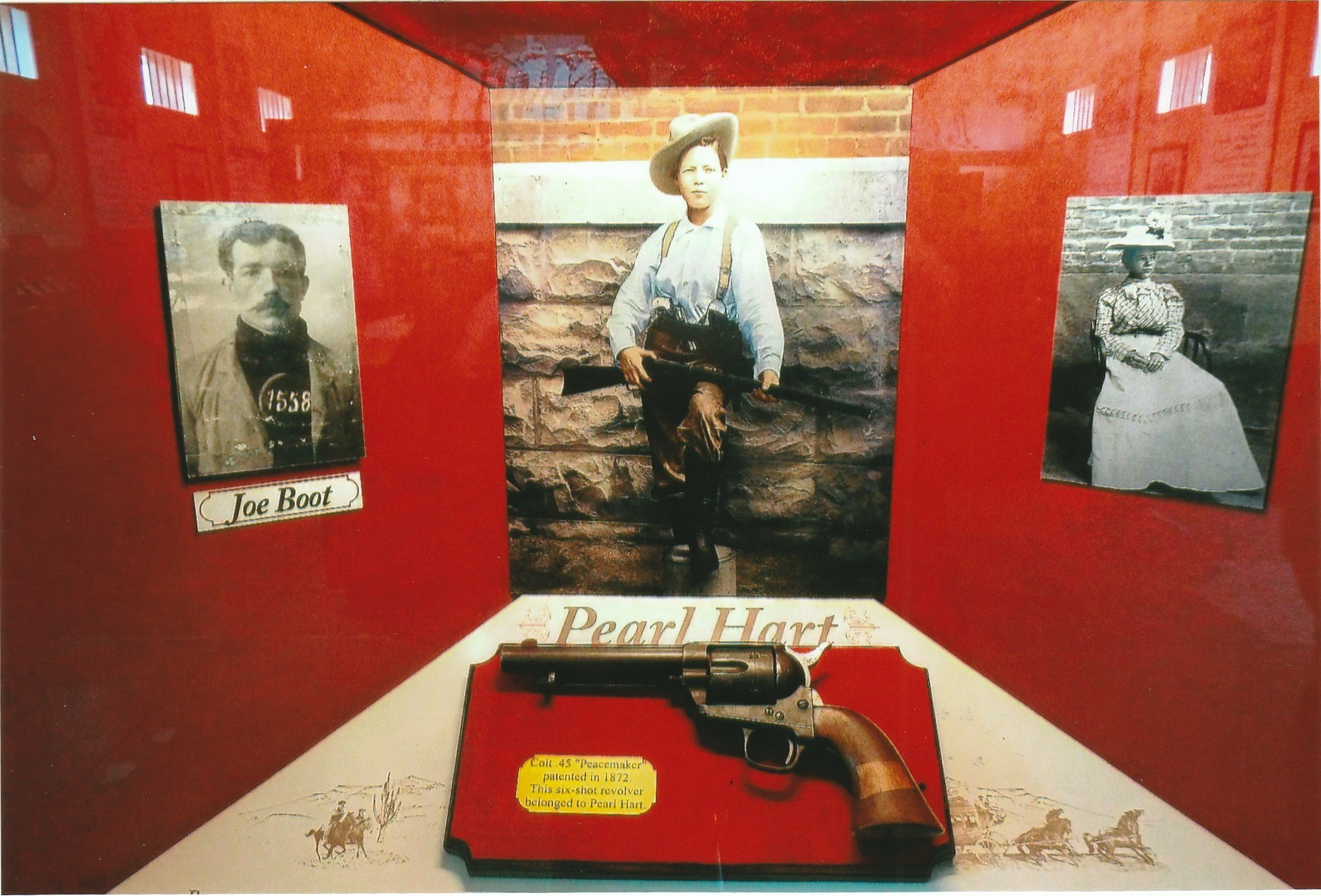
Pearl Hart's gun.

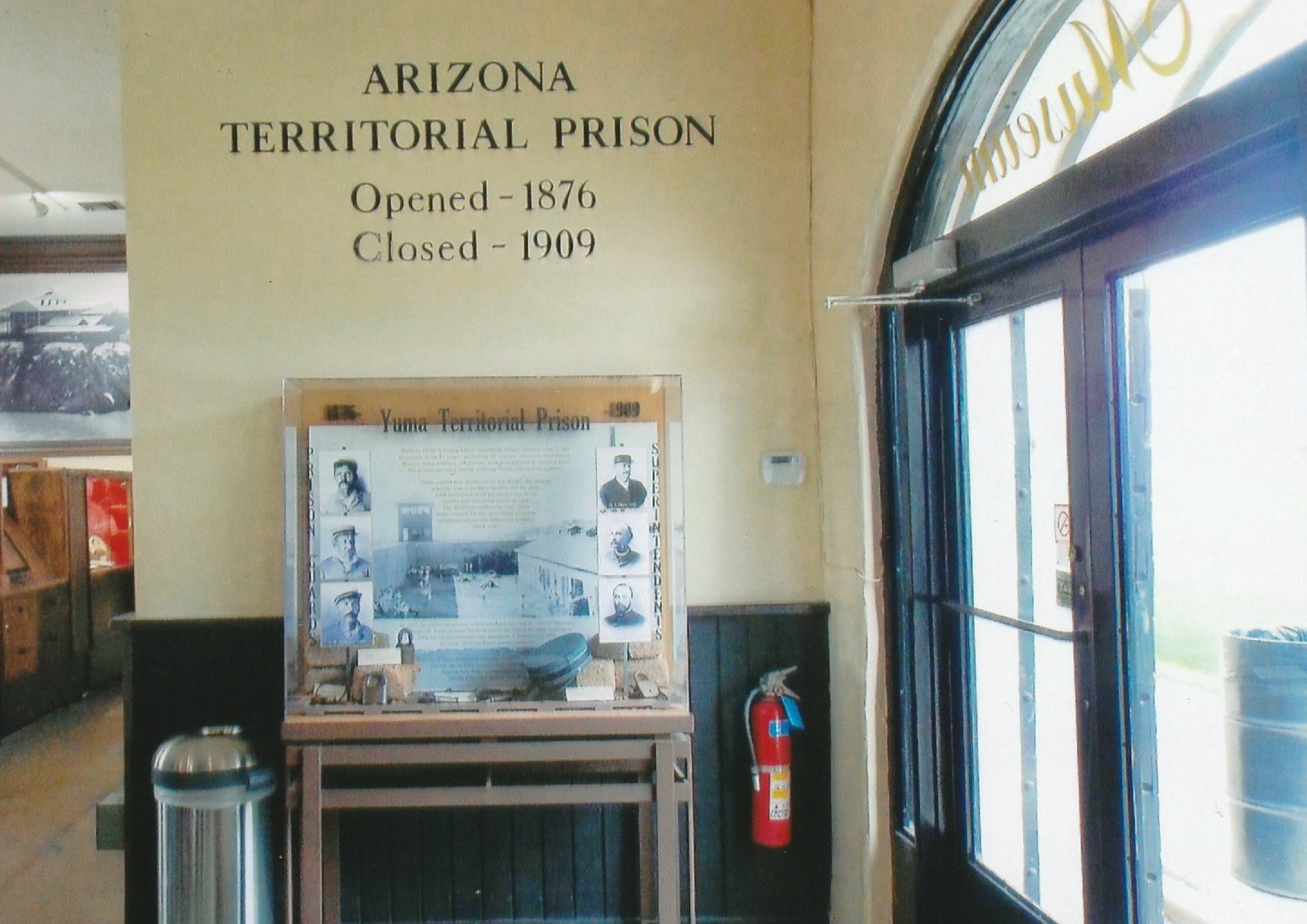
Museum display.

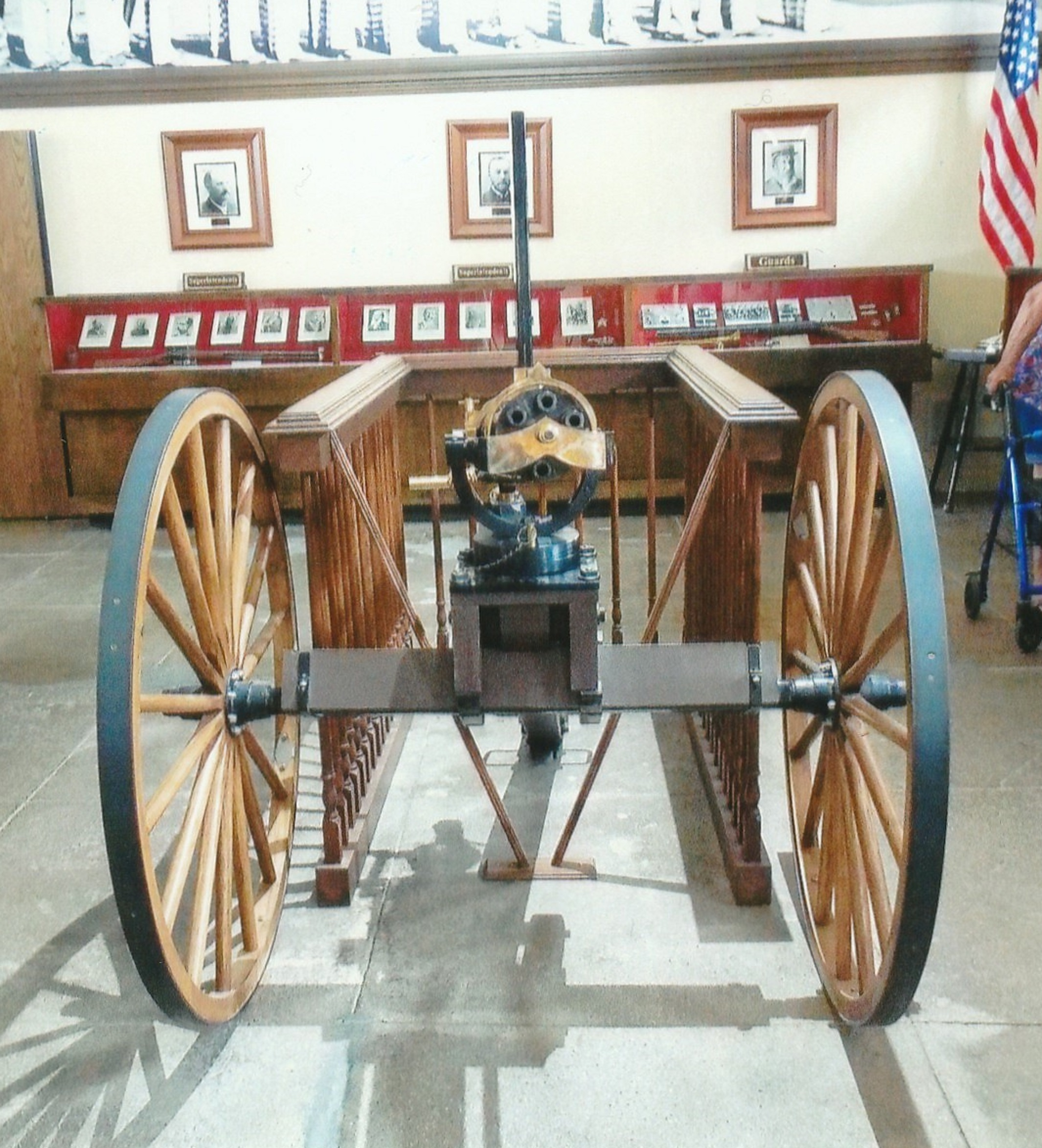
Gatling gun.

=== Yuma Quartermaster Depot ===
The Yuma Crossing is a site in Arizona and California that is significant for its association with transportation and communication across the Colorado River during the Spanish colonial and the American expansion eras. The Yuma Quartermaster Depot served as a historic Army supply depot that operated during Arizona's Indian Wars period from 1865 to 1883. The supplies gathered at the quartermaster depot, which is located along the Colorado River, were shipped throughout the southwest via river boats and overland on mule team freight wagons. Up to 900 mules were kept in stables at Yuma Quartermaster Depot. Pictured are the following images related to the Yuma Crossing and the Yuma Quartermaster Depot in the Yuma Quartermaster Depot State Historic Park.

- The Yuma Crossing Marker located on the Banks of the Colorado River. Listed in the National Register of Historic Places on November 13, 1966, reference #66000197.
- The Yuma Quartermaster Depot was built in 1864. It was listed in the National Register of Historic Places on November 13, 1966, as part of the Yuma Crossing, reference #66000197.
- The Southern Pacific Railroad Passenger Coach Car – S.P. X7 – was built in 1875 and listed in the National Register of Historic Places on March 2, 2000, reference #00000101.
- Southern Pacific Railroad Locomotive X2521 – was built by the Baldwin Locomotive Works in Eddystone (Philadelphia) PA in August 1907.
Yuma Quartermaster Depot State Historic Park

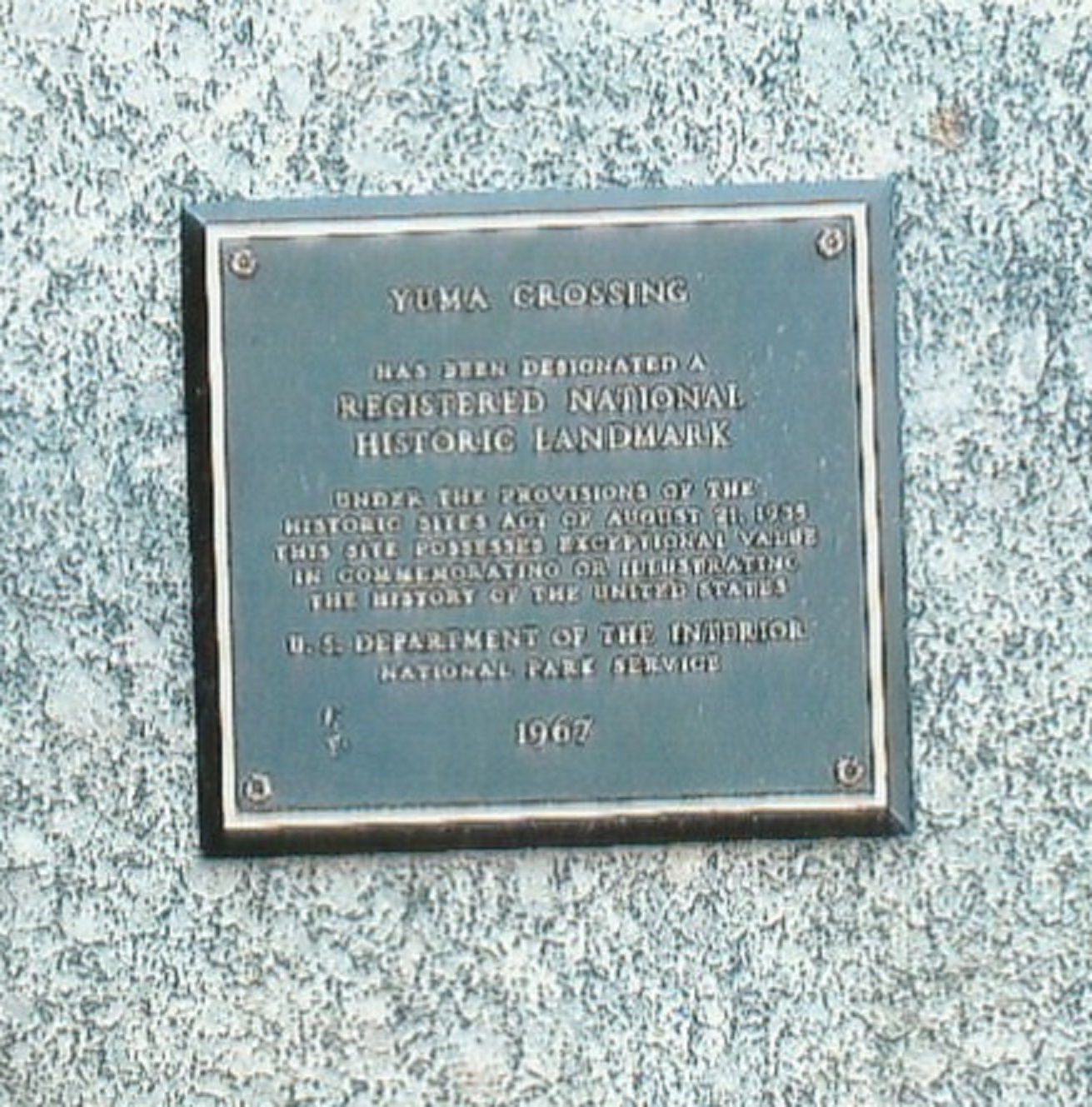
Yuma Crossing Marker

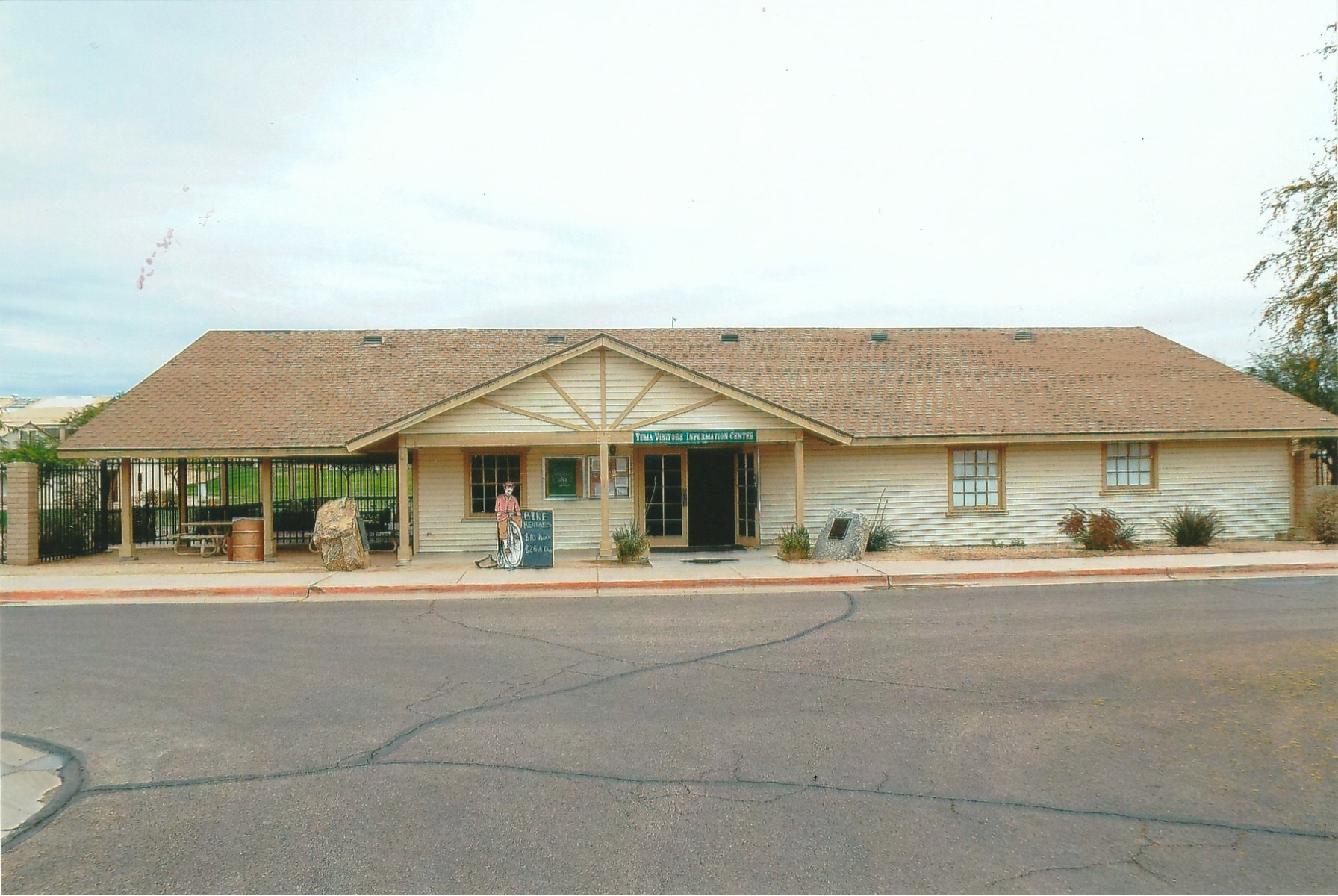
Yuma Quartermaster Depot.

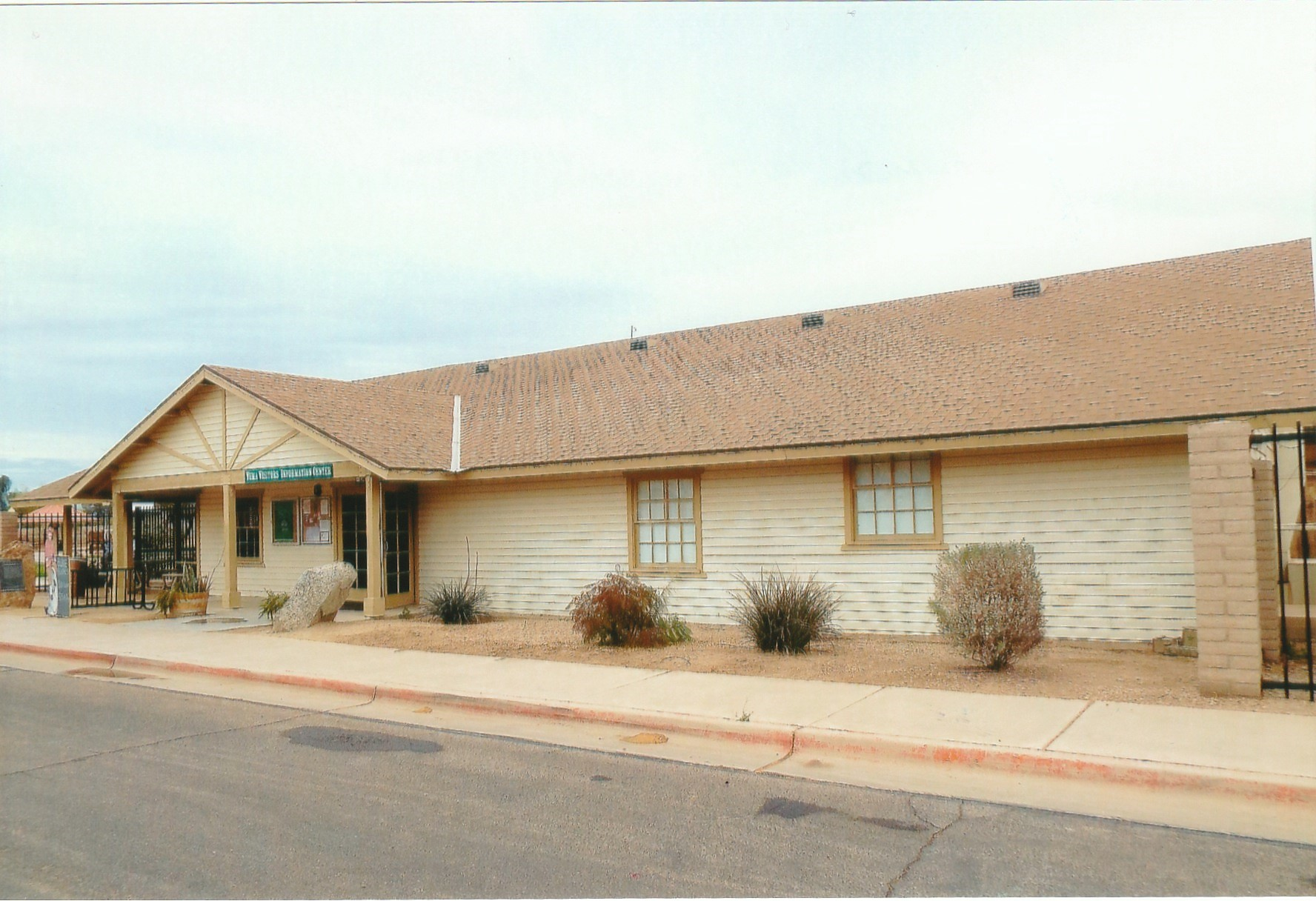
Different view of the Yuma Quartermaster Depot.

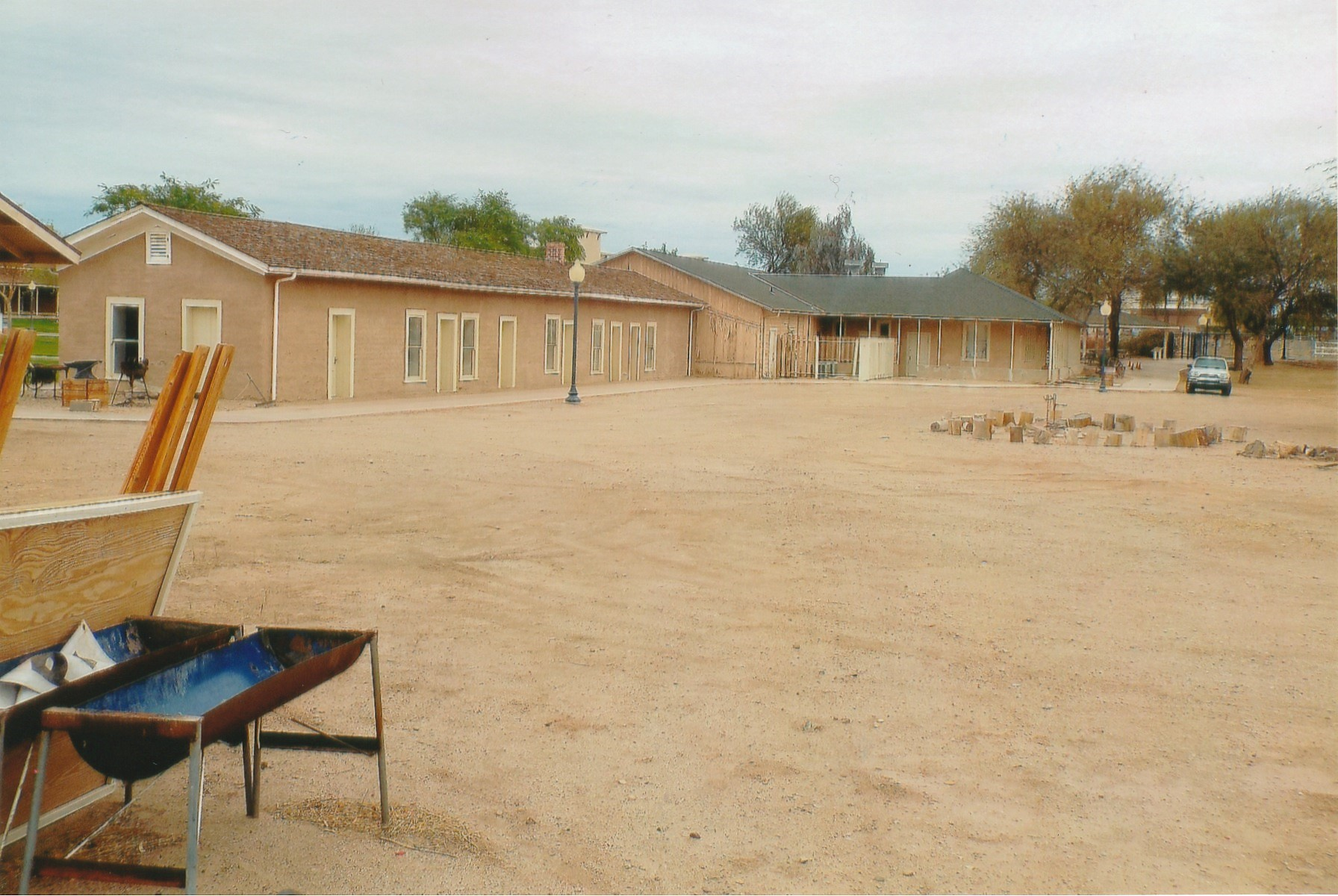
Yuma Quartermaster Depot buildings.

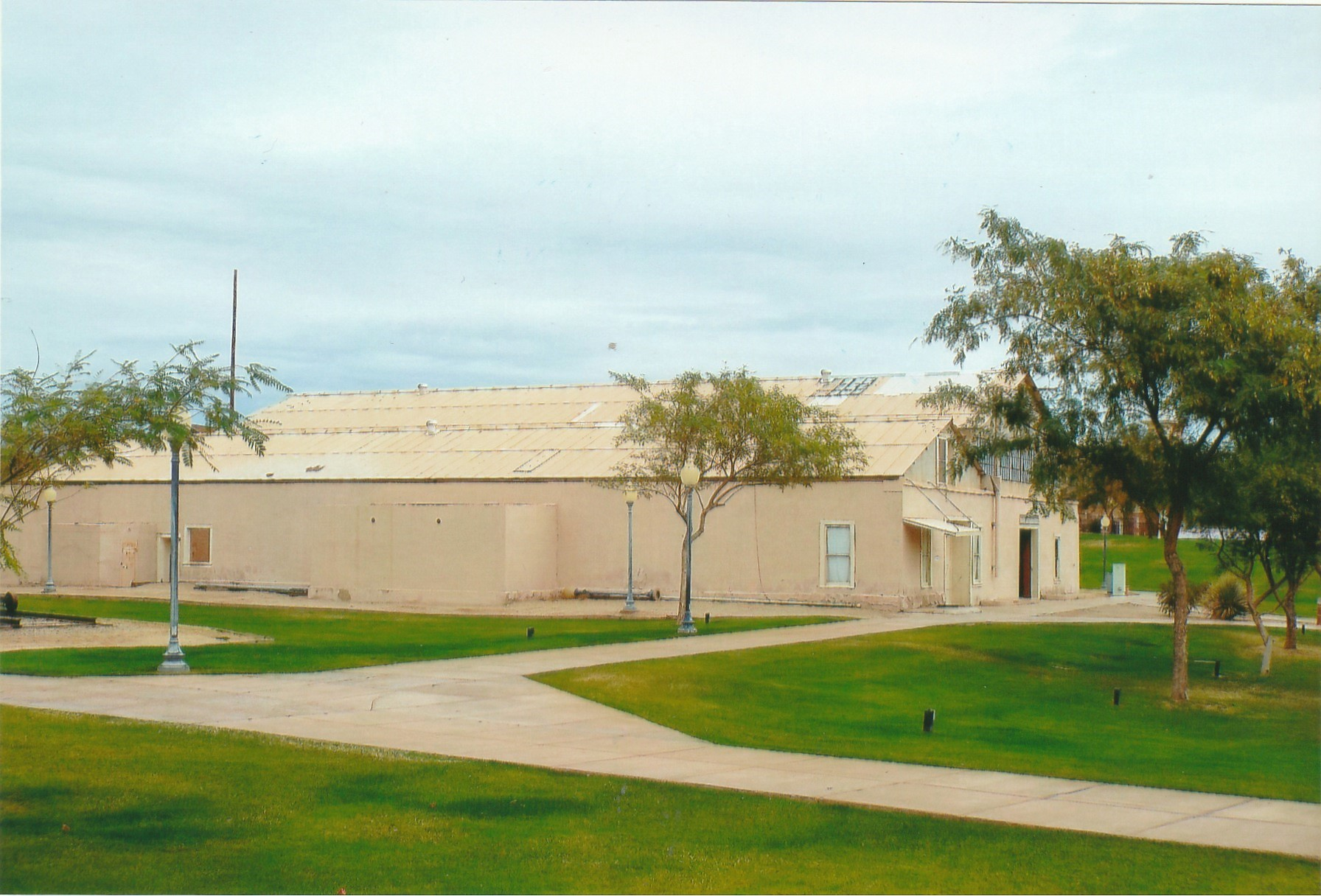
Yuma Quartermaster Depot warehouse.

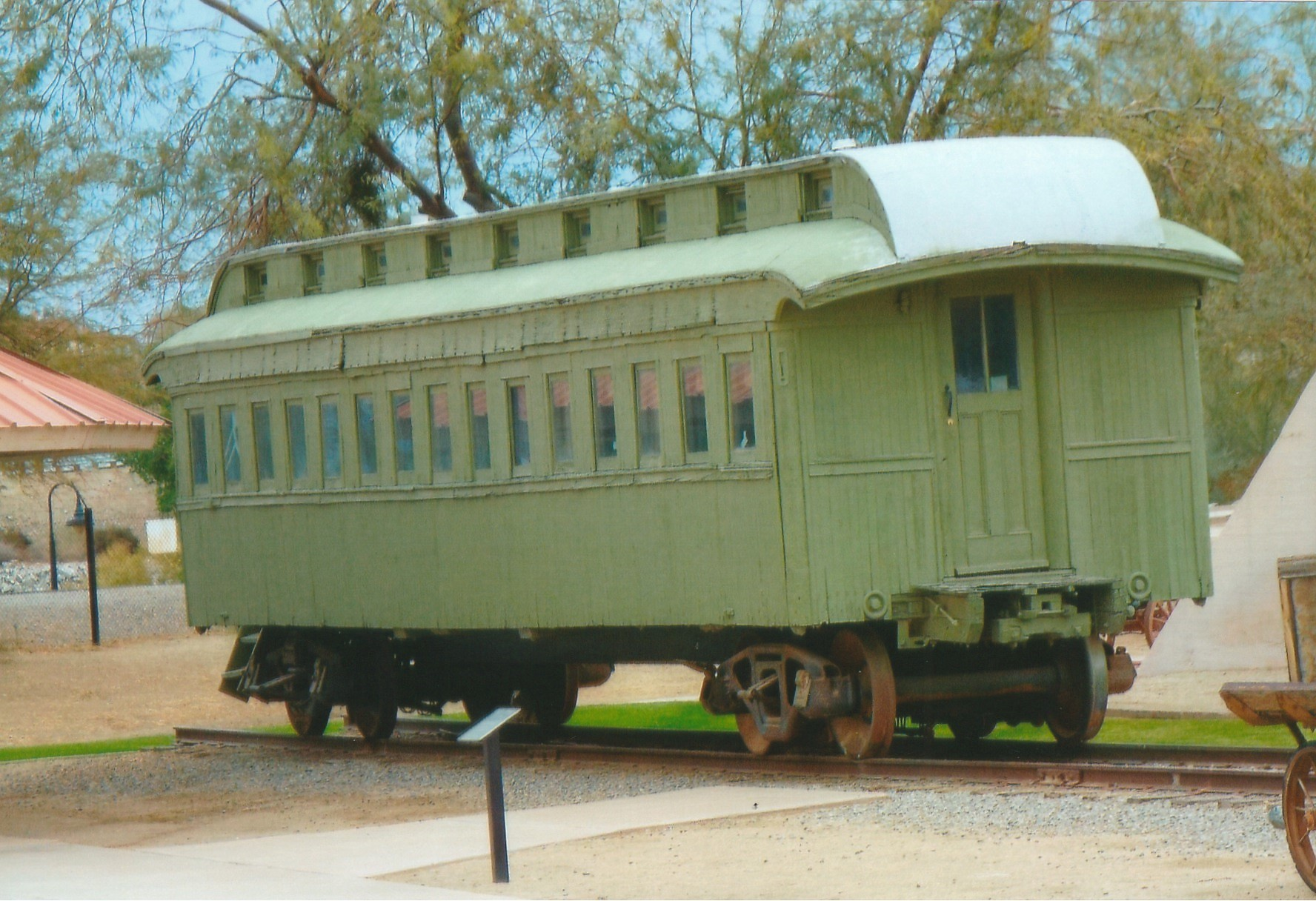
Southern Pacific Railroad Passenger Coach Car-S.P. X7

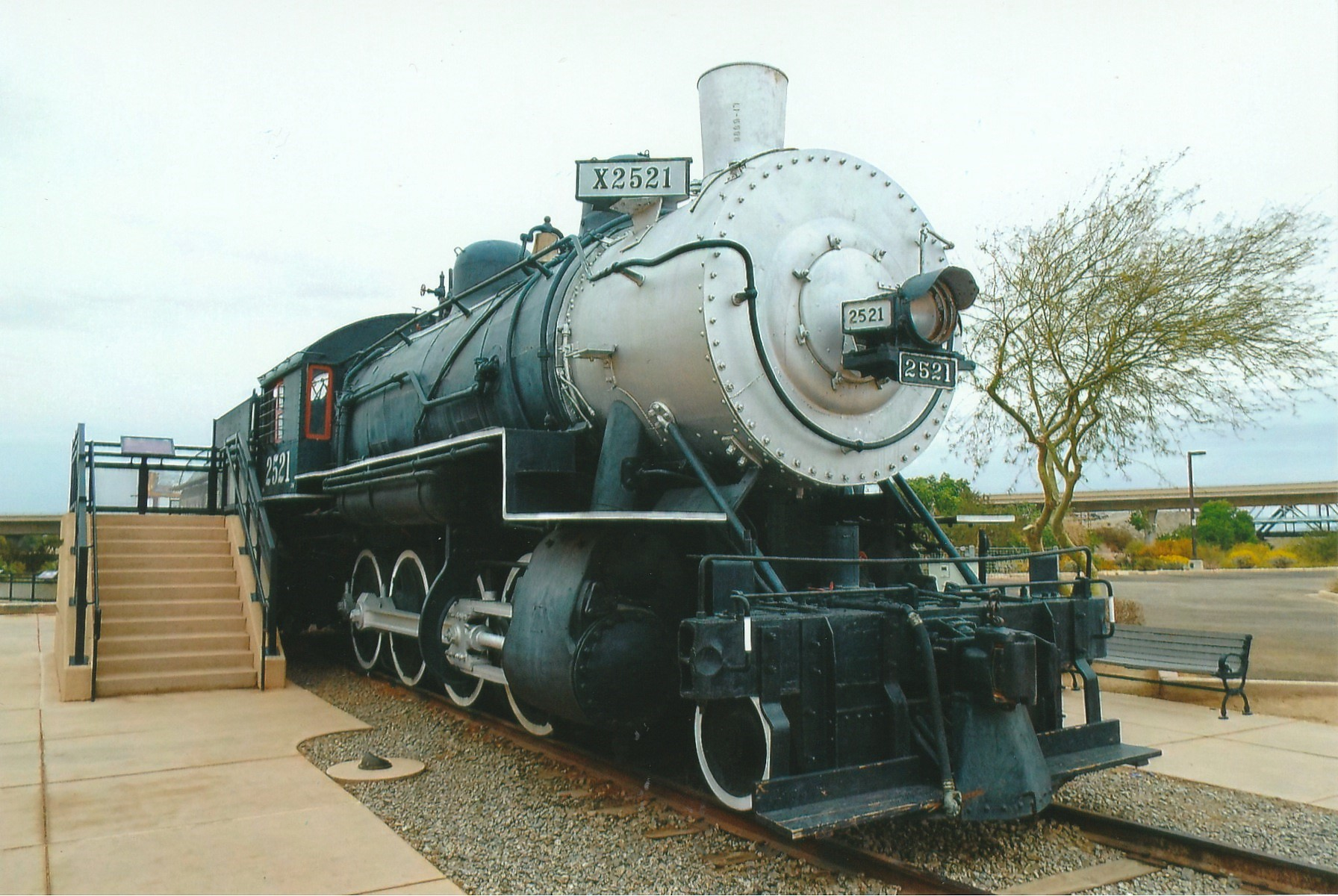
Southern Pacific Railroad Locomotive X2521

== See also ==
- Yuma Quartermaster Depot State Historic Park
- National Register of Historic Places listings in Yuma County, Arizona
