= National Register of Historic Places listings in Yuma County, Arizona =

Location of Yuma County in Arizona

This is a list of the National Register of Historic Places listings in Yuma County, Arizona. It is intended to be a complete list of the properties and districts on the National Register of Historic Places in Yuma County, Arizona, United States. The locations of National Register properties and districts for which the latitude and longitude coordinates are included below, may be seen in a map.

There are 57 properties and districts listed on the National Register in the county, including 1 that is also a National Historic Landmark. Another three properties were once listed, but have since been removed.

This National Park Service list is complete through NPS recent listings posted May 1, 2026.

== Listings county-wide ==
	Name on the Register	Image	Date listed	Location	City or town	Description
1	Antelope Hill Highway Bridge	Antelope Hill Highway Bridge	June 28, 1979 (#79003444)	Northwest of Tacna spanning the Gila River; 32°43′08″N 114°00′43″W	Tacna	
2	Balsz House	Balsz House	December 7, 1982 (#82001624)	475 2nd Ave. 32°43′08″N 114°37′18″W	Yuma	
3	Blaisdell Slow Sand Filter Washing Machine	Blaisdell Slow Sand Filter Washing Machine	January 18, 1979 (#79000430)	N. Jones St. 32°43′38″N 114°37′00″W	Yuma	
4	Brinley Avenue Historic District	Brinley Avenue Historic District	December 7, 1982 (#82001625)	29-96 W. 2nd St., 198-200 S. Main, 201 S. 1st, and 102-298 Madison Aves. 32°43′25″N 114°37′07″W	Yuma	
5	Brown House	Brown House	December 7, 1982 (#82001626)	268 S. 1st Ave. 32°43′20″N 114°37′13″W	Yuma	
6	Brownstetter House	Brownstetter House	December 7, 1982 (#82001627)	627 Orange Ave. 32°42′56″N 114°37′24″W	Yuma	
7	Cactus Press-Plaza Paint Building	Cactus Press-Plaza Paint Building	April 24, 1987 (#87000613)	30-54 E. 3rd St. 32°43′21″N 114°37′06″W	Yuma	
8	Camp Horn Monument	Camp Horn Monument	September 12, 2003 (#03000900)	Approximately 8 miles north of Interstate 8; 32°55′07″N 113°33′55″W	Dateland	
9	Caruthers House	Caruthers House	December 7, 1982 (#82001628)	441 2nd Ave. 32°43′09″N 114°37′20″W	Yuma	
10	Connor House		December 7, 1982 (#82001629)	281 S. 1st Ave. 32°43′19″N 114°37′13″W	Yuma	
11	Double Roof House	Double Roof House	December 7, 1982 (#82001631)	553 4th Ave. 32°43′01″N 114°37′25″W	Yuma	
12	Dressing Apartments	Dressing Apartments	December 7, 1982 (#82001630)	146 1st Ave. 32°43′28″N 114°37′13″W	Yuma	
13	El Camino Del Diablo	El Camino Del Diablo	December 1, 1978 (#78000560)	Northwest of Lukeville; 32°04′20″N 113°23′12″W	Lukeville	
14	Frank Ewing House	Frank Ewing House	December 7, 1982 (#82001632)	700 2nd Ave. 32°42′51″N 114°37′19″W	Yuma	
15	Ruth Ewing House	Ruth Ewing House	December 7, 1982 (#82004844)	712 2nd Ave. 32°42′50″N 114°37′21″W	Yuma	Concrete block cottage built in 1906
16	Fourth Avenue Junior High School	Fourth Avenue Junior High School	December 7, 1982 (#82001633)	450 S. 4th Ave. 32°43′07″N 114°37′28″W	Yuma	
17	Gandolfo Theater	Gandolfo Theater	December 7, 1982 (#82001636)	200 S. 1st Ave. 32°43′24″N 114°37′13″W	Yuma	
18	Alfred Griffin House	Alfred Griffin House	December 7, 1982 (#82001637)	641 1st Ave. 32°42′55″N 114°37′11″W	Yuma	
19	Peter B. Hodges House	Peter B. Hodges House	December 7, 1982 (#82001638)	209 Orange Ave. 32°43′09″N 114°37′20″W	Yuma	The Hodges House is in a total state of abandonment
20	Hotel del Ming	Hotel del Ming	December 7, 1982 (#82001639)	300 Gila St. 32°43′21″N 114°36′56″W	Yuma	
21	E.B. Jackson House	E.B. Jackson House	December 7, 1982 (#82001640)	572 1st Ave. 32°43′00″N 114°37′15″W	Yuma	
22	Jerry Kent House	Jerry Kent House	December 7, 1982 (#82001641)	450 3rd Ave. 32°43′07″N 114°37′24″W	Yuma	
23	Lee Hotel	Lee Hotel	April 12, 1984 (#84000750)	390 Main St. 32°43′16″N 114°37′04″W	Yuma	
24	Henry Levy House	Henry Levy House	December 7, 1982 (#82001642)	602 2nd Ave. 32°42′57″N 114°37′17″W	Yuma	
25	George Marable House	George Marable House	December 7, 1982 (#82001643)	482 Orange Ave. 32°43′10″N 114°37′18″W	Yuma	
26	Martinez Lake Site (AZ-050-0210)	Martinez Lake Site (AZ-050-0210)	September 10, 1987 (#87001446)	Address Restricted	Fisher's Landing	
27	Masonic Temple	Masonic Temple	April 12, 1984 (#84000752)	153 S. 2nd Ave. 32°43′29″N 114°37′18″W	Yuma	
28	Carmelita Mayhew House	Carmelita Mayhew House	December 7, 1982 (#82001644)	660 1st Ave. 32°42′54″N 114°37′15″W	Yuma	
29	McPhaul Suspension Bridge	McPhaul Suspension Bridge	August 13, 1981 (#81000140)	West of Dome; 32°45′34″N 114°25′14″W	Dome	
30	Methodist Episcopal Church	Methodist Episcopal Church	December 7, 1982 (#82001645)	256 S. 1st Ave. 32°43′20″N 114°37′13″W	Yuma	
31	Methodist Parsonage	Methodist Parsonage	December 7, 1982 (#82001646)	248 S. 1st Ave. 32°43′21″N 114°37′13″W	Yuma	
32	Mexican Consulate		December 7, 1982 (#82001647)	129 W. 4th St. 32°43′11″N 114°37′16″W	Yuma	
33	A.B. Ming House	A.B. Ming House	December 7, 1982 (#82001648)	468 Orange Ave. 32°43′09″N 114°37′19″W	Yuma	
34	Mohawk Valley School	Mohawk Valley School	December 29, 1986 (#86003525)	5151 South Ave. 39 East; 32°45′06″N 113°58′47″W	Roll	
35	Norton House	Norton House	December 7, 1982 (#82001649)	226 S. 1st Ave. 32°43′22″N 114°37′13″W	Yuma	
36	Ocean to Ocean Bridge	Ocean to Ocean Bridge	September 11, 1979 (#79000431)	Penitentiary Ave. 32°43′42″N 114°36′53″W	Yuma	
37	Ortiz House	Ortiz House	December 7, 1982 (#82001650)	206 S. 1st Ave. 32°43′23″N 114°37′13″W	Yuma	
38	Pancrazi House	Pancrazi House	December 7, 1982 (#82001651)	432 S. Madison Ave. 32°43′11″N 114°37′08″W	Yuma	
39	Pauley Apartments	Pauley Apartments	December 7, 1982 (#82001652)	490 W. 1st St. 32°43′30″N 114°37′32″W	Yuma	
40	Power Apartments	Power Apartments	December 7, 1982 (#82001653)	20 W. 3rd St. 32°43′21″N 114°37′08″W	Yuma	
41	Clara Smith Riley House	Clara Smith Riley House	December 7, 1982 (#82001654)	734 2nd Ave. 32°42′50″N 114°37′19″W	Yuma	
42	Roosevelt School	Roosevelt School	December 7, 1982 (#82001655)	550 W. 5th St. 32°43′06″N 114°37′35″W	Yuma	
43	Russell-Williamson House	Russell-Williamson House	December 7, 1982 (#82001656)	652 2nd Ave. 32°42′54″N 114°37′19″W	Yuma	
44	St. Paul's Episcopal Church	St. Paul's Episcopal Church	December 7, 1982 (#82001657)	637 2nd Ave. 32°42′54″N 114°37′16″W	Yuma	
45	San Carlos Hotel	San Carlos Hotel	April 12, 1984 (#84000754)	106 1st St. 32°43′32″N 114°37′04″W	Yuma	
46	San Ysidro Hacienda	San Ysidro Hacienda	October 10, 1975 (#75000371)	Address Restricted	Yuma	
47	Sears Point Archaeological District	Sears Point Archaeological District	October 16, 1985 (#85003150)	Address Restricted	Gila Bend	
48	J. Homer Smith House	J. Homer Smith House	December 7, 1982 (#82001658)	600 5th Ave. 32°42′57″N 114°37′29″W	Yuma	
49	Southern Pacific Freight Depot	Southern Pacific Freight Depot	April 24, 1987 (#87000614)	Main St. 32°43′13″N 114°37′03″W	Yuma	
50	Southern Pacific Railroad Passenger Coach Car-S.P. X7	Southern Pacific Railroad Passenger Coach Car-S.P. X7	March 2, 2000 (#00000101)	201 N. 4th Ave. 32°43′40″N 114°37′19″W	Yuma	
51	Stoffela Store/Railroad Exchange	Stoffela Store/Railroad Exchange	December 7, 1982 (#82001659)	447 S. Main St. 32°43′10″N 114°37′07″W	Yuma	
52	US Post Office-Yuma Main	US Post Office-Yuma Main	December 3, 1985 (#85003109)	370 W. 3rd St. 32°43′17″N 114°37′02″W	Yuma	
53	Yuma Century Heights Conservancy Residential Historic District	Yuma Century Heights Conservancy Residential Historic District	October 11, 1988 (#88001834)	Roughly bounded by 4th Ave., 8th St., and 1st and Orange Aves. 32°43′00″N 114°37′17″W	Yuma	
54	Yuma City Hall	Yuma City Hall	December 7, 1982 (#82001660)	181 W. 1st St. 32°43′32″N 114°37′13″W	Yuma	
55	Yuma County Courthouse	Yuma County Courthouse	December 7, 1982 (#82001661)	168 S. 2nd Ave. 32°43′26″N 114°37′18″W	Yuma	
56	Yuma Crossing and Associated Sites	Yuma Crossing and Associated Sites	November 13, 1966 (#66000197)	Banks of the Colorado River; 32°43′48″N 114°37′05″W	Yuma	
57	Yuma Main Street Historic District	Yuma Main Street Historic District	March 10, 1994 (#94000068)	170-387 S. Main St. and 10-29 W. 3rd St. 32°43′21″N 114°37′01″W	Yuma	

== Former listings ==
	Name on the Register	Image	Date listed	Date removed	Location	City or town	Description
1	Fredley Apartments	Fredley Apartments	December 7, 1982 (#82001634)	May 17, 2018	406 2nd Ave. 32°43′10″N 114°37′17″W	Yuma	
2	Fredley House		December 7, 1982 (#82001635)	May 17, 2018	408 2nd Ave. 32°43′09″N 114°37′17″W	Yuma	
3	Southern Pacific Railroad Depot	Southern Pacific Railroad Depot	June 22, 1976 (#76000384)	August 22, 2019	Gila St. 32°43′24″N 114°36′54″W	Yuma	Became the Yuma Art Center. Destroyed by fire April 19, 1993.

== See also ==
- List of National Historic Landmarks in Arizona
- National Register of Historic Places listings in Arizona
