= Ruth Ewing House =

- U.S. National Register of Historic Places
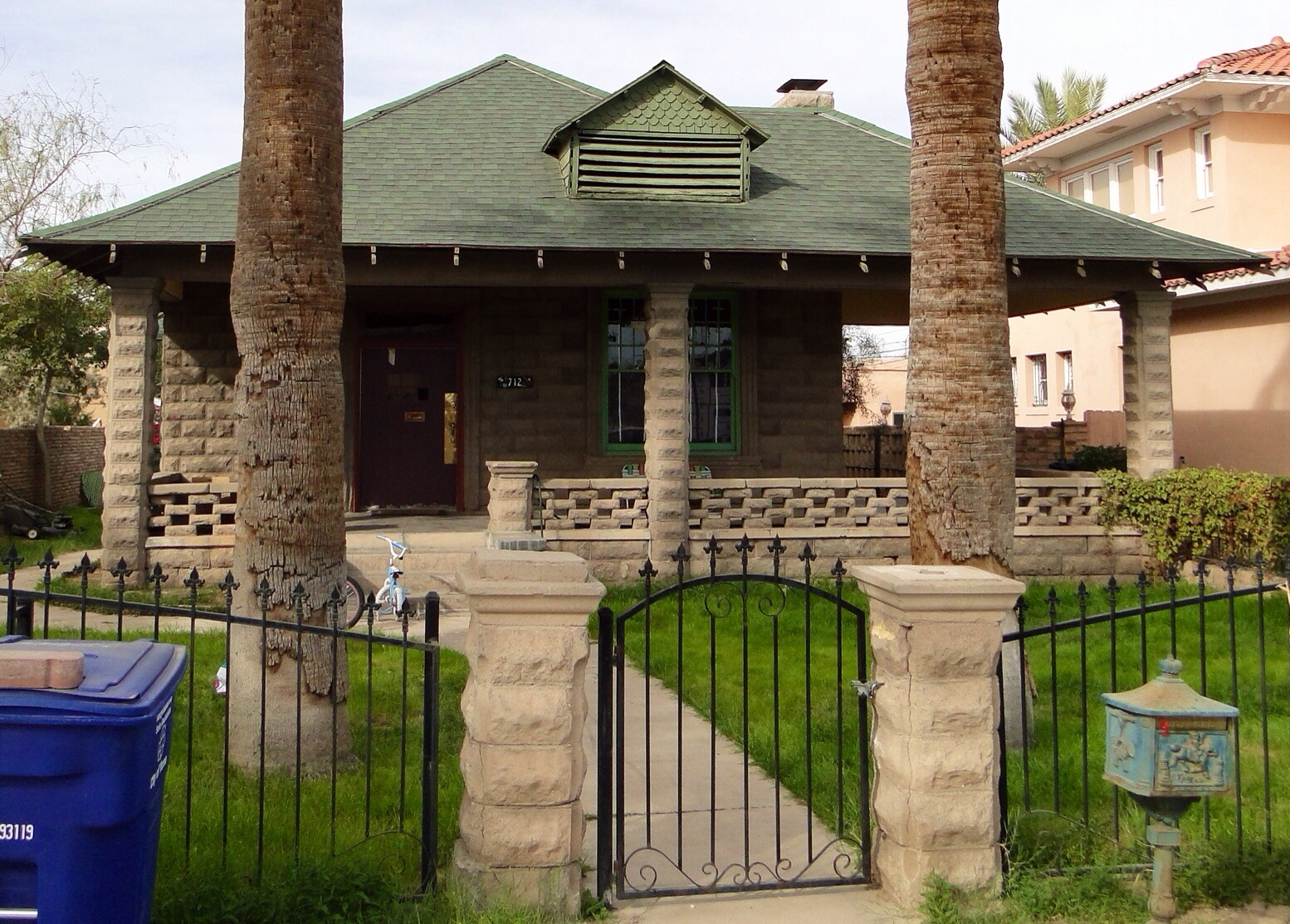
- The house in 2014

- Location within Arizona
- Location: 712 2nd Avenue, Yuma, Arizona
- Coordinates: 32.714006°N 114.622394°W
- Area: less than one acre
- Built: 1906
- Architectural style: concrete block cottage
- MPS: Yuma MRA
- NRHP reference No.: 82004844
- Added to NRHP: December 7, 1982

The Ruth Ewing House is a historic concrete block cottage in Yuma, Arizona, with a hipped roof. It was built in 1906 for Ruth Ewing, a parishioner of the St. Paul's Episcopal Church. Ewing bequeathed the house to the church, and it was later purchased by Reverend R. W. Dixon. It has been listed on the National Register of Historic Places since December 7, 1982.
