= San Carlos Hotel =

San Carlos Hotel may refer to:

- San Carlos Hotel (Pensacola, Florida), formerly on the U.S. National Register of Historic Places, demolished in 1994
- Hotel San Carlos (Phoenix), Arizona, also known as (and listed on the NRHP as) San Carlos Hotel
- San Carlos Hotel (Yuma, Arizona), listed on the NRHP
