= Lee Hotel =

- U.S. National Register of Historic Places
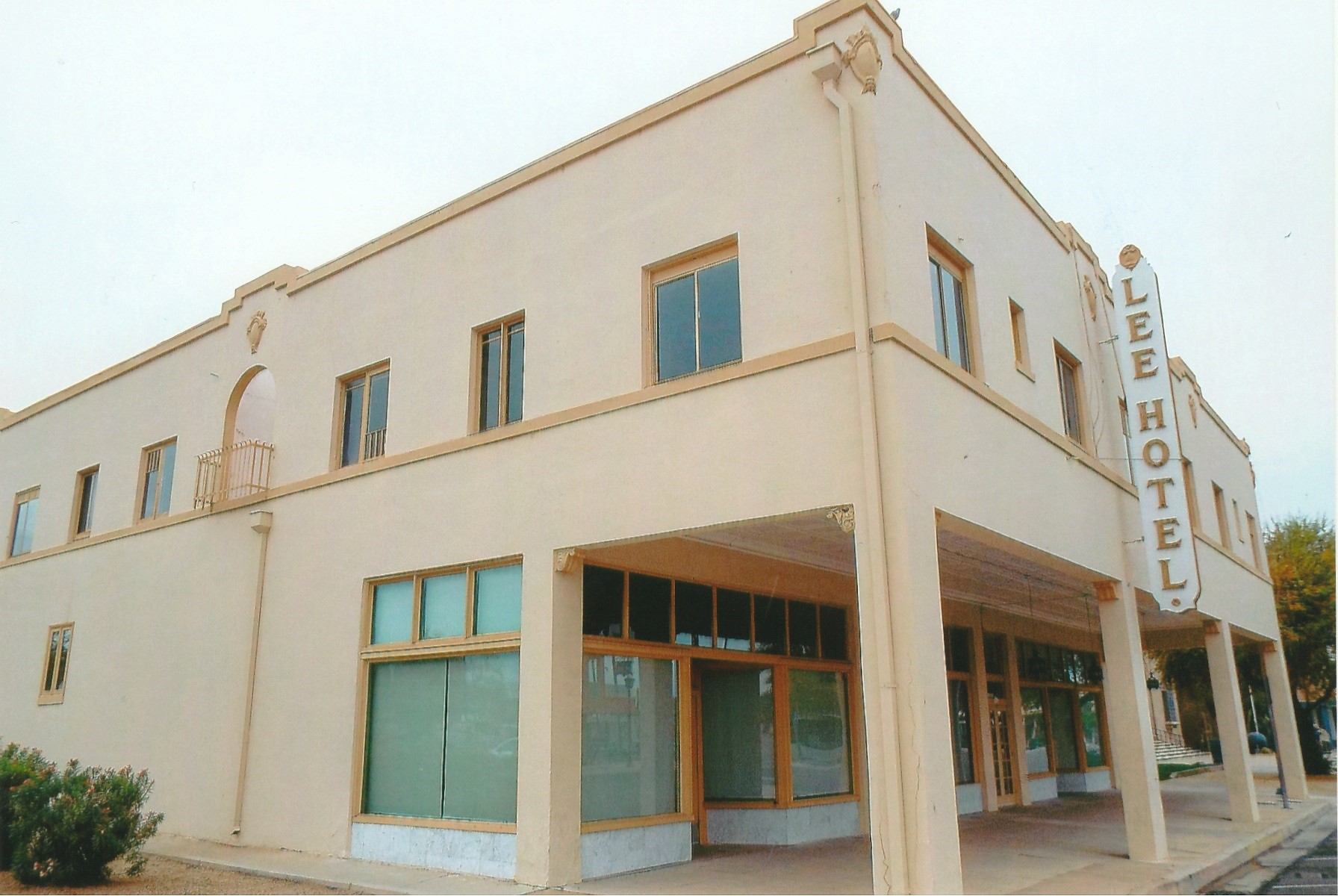
- The hotel in 2018

- Location within Arizona
- Location: 390 Main Street, Yuma, Arizona
- Coordinates: 32°43′16″N 114°37′04″W
- Area: less than one acre
- Built: 1917
- Architectural style: Spanish Colonial Revival
- MPS: Yuma MRA
- NRHP reference No.: 84000750
- Added to NRHP: April 12, 1984

The Lee Hotel is a “haunted” historic hotel in Yuma, Arizona. It is a two-story building, with 30 hotel rooms, completed in 1917. It was opened by Mary Darcy, who named it for Confederate General Robert E. Lee. It was designed in the Spanish Colonial Revival architectural style. It has been listed on the National Register of Historic Places since April 12, 1984.
