= Gandolfo Theater =

United States historic place in Yuma County, Arizona

- U.S. National Register of Historic Places
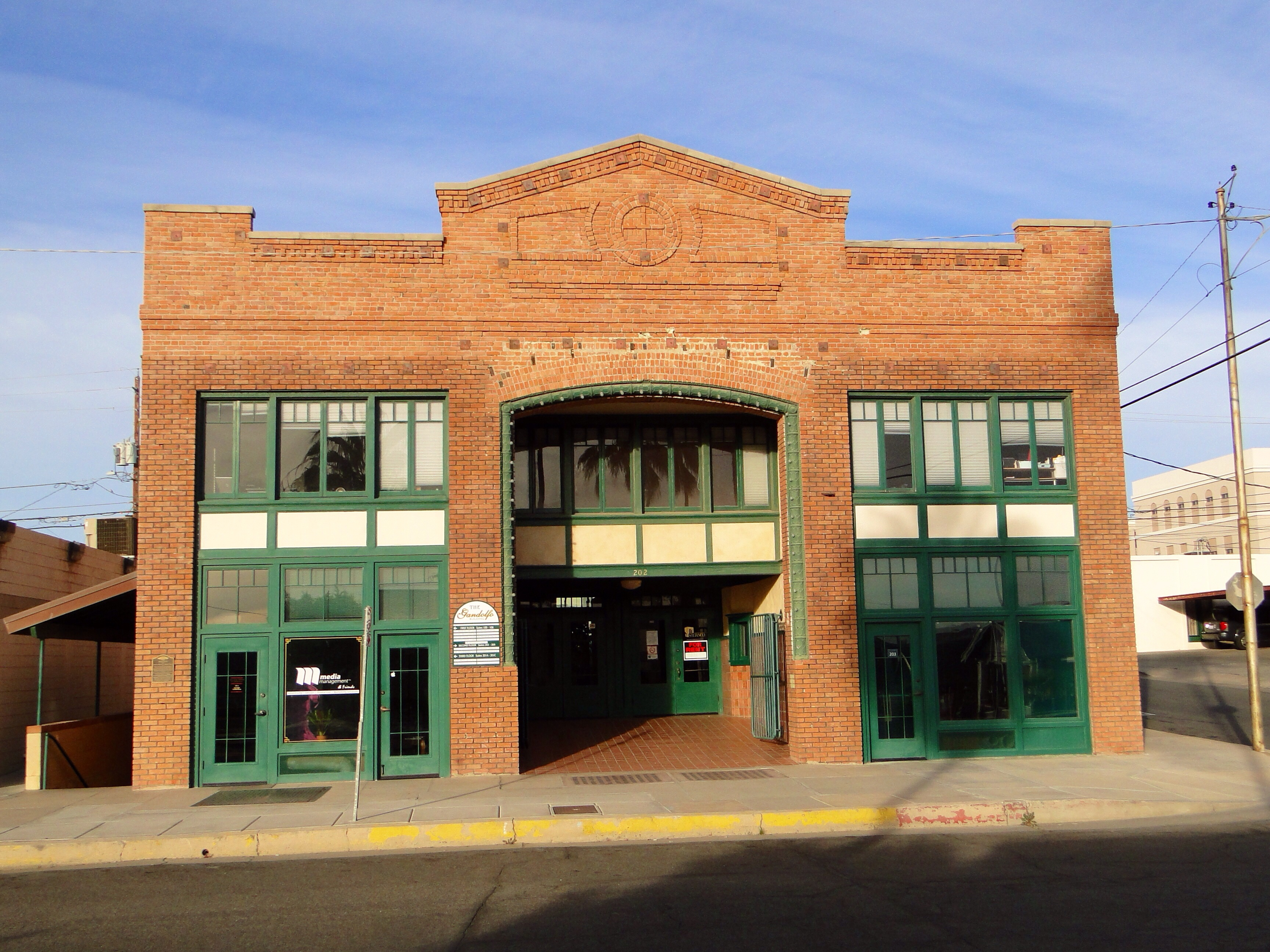
- The theater in 2014

- Location within Arizona
- Location: 200 South 1st Avenue, Yuma, Arizona
- Coordinates: 32°43′24″N 114°37′13″W
- Area: less than one acre
- Built: 1917
- Built by: John Gandolfo
- Architectural style: Early Commercial
- MPS: Yuma MRA
- NRHP reference No.: 82001636
- Added to NRHP: December 7, 1982

The Gandolfo Theater is a historic building in Yuma, Arizona. It was built by John Gandolfo in 1917. It showed plays and movies, and it was also a meeting place for Elks and Freemasons until the third floor burned down in 1927. The theater closed down in 1950. It has been listed on the National Register of Historic Places since December 7, 1982.
