= Yuma City Hall =

- U.S. National Register of Historic Places
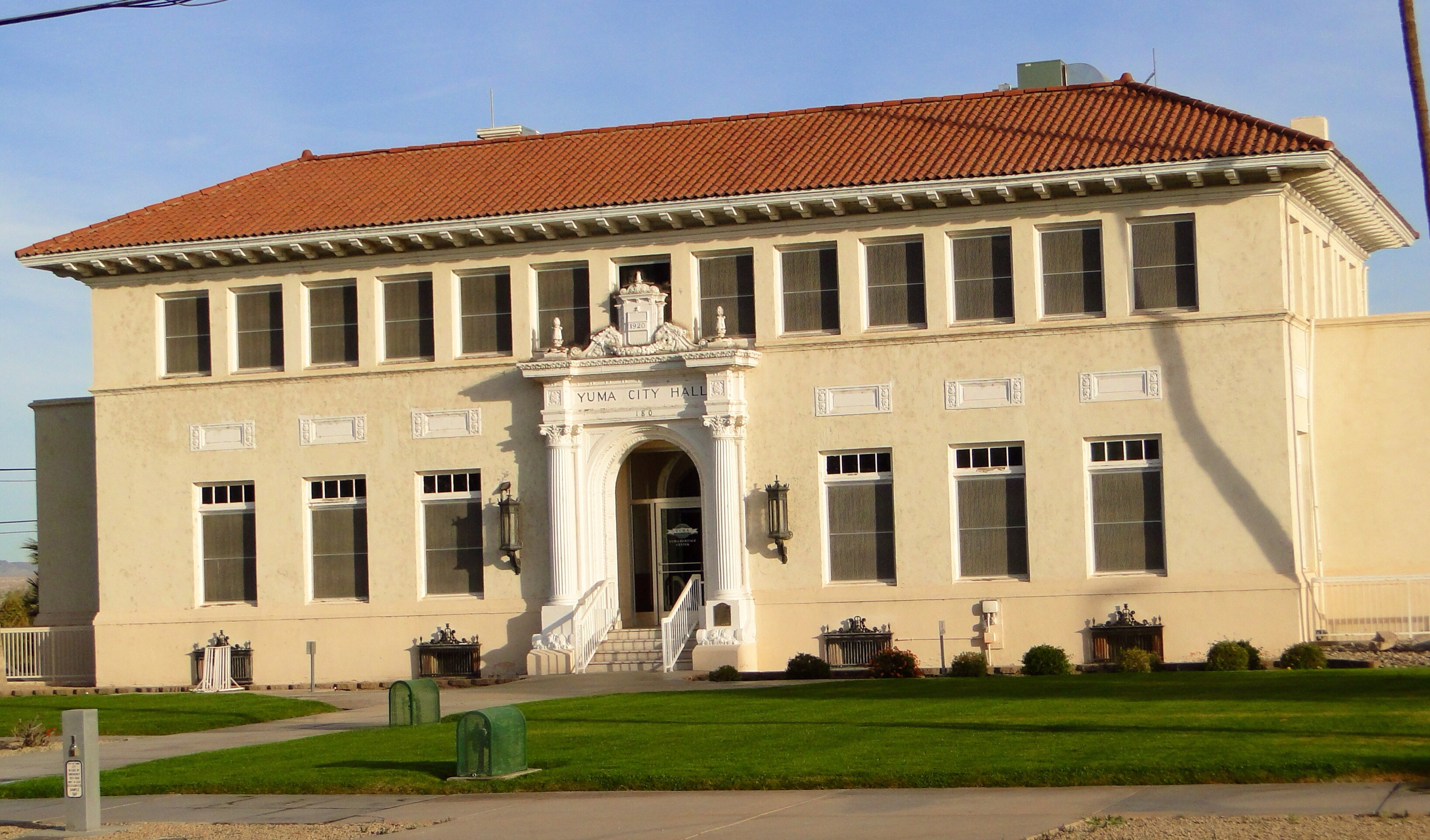
- The Old Yuma City Hall in 2014

- Location within Arizona
- Location: 181 West 1st Street, Yuma, Arizona
- Coordinates: 32°43′32″N 114°37′13″W
- Area: less than one acre
- Built: 1921
- Architect: Lyman & Place
- Architectural style: Spanish Colonial Revival
- MPS: Yuma MRA
- NRHP reference No.: 82001660
- Added to NRHP: December 7, 1982

The Yuma City Hall is a historic building in Yuma, Arizona. It was built in 1921, and it served as Yuma's city hall for many years. It was designed by Lyman & Place in the Spanish Colonial Revival architectural style. It has been listed on the National Register of Historic Places since December 7, 1982.
