= United States Post Office–Yuma Main =

- US Post Office – Yuma Main
- U.S. National Register of Historic Places
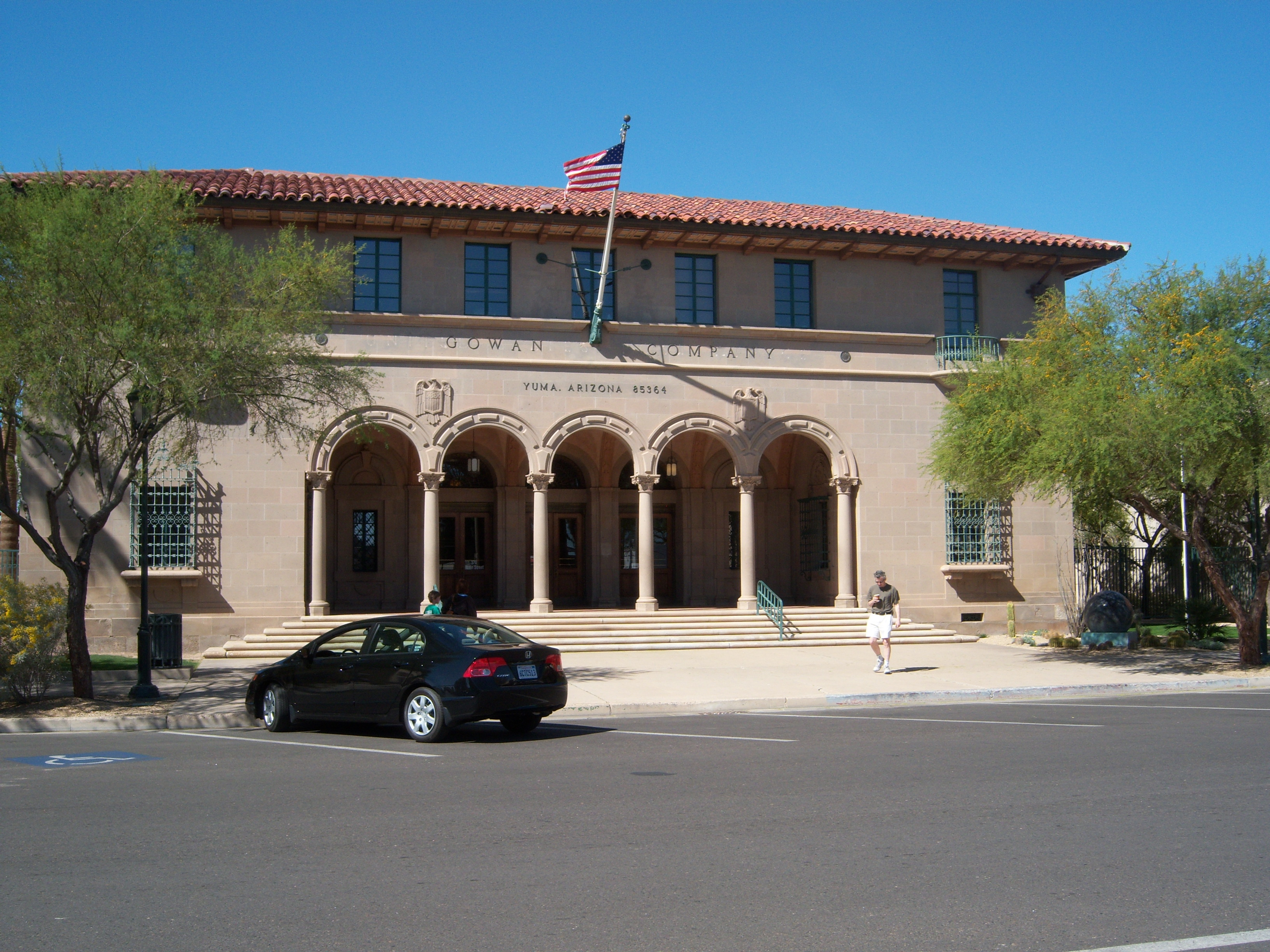

- Location within Arizona Location within the United States
- Location: 370 S. Main St., Yuma, Arizona
- Coordinates: 32°43′17″N 114°37′2″W
- Area: 0.5 acres (0.20 ha)
- Built: 1933
- Built by: Bannister Field Co.
- Architect: Place, Roy
- Architectural style: Beaux Arts, Spanish Colonial Revival
- MPS: Historic US Post Offices in Arizona, 1900–1941, TR
- NRHP reference No.: 85003109
- Added to NRHP: December 3, 1985

The Gowan Company Building, formerly known as the Yuma Main Post Office or Yuma Downtown Postal Annex, is a historic building in Yuma, Arizona. Constructed in 1933 to serve as the city's main post office, the building's design, a work of architect Roy Place, is a blend of the Beaux Arts and Spanish Colonial Revival styles. The design includes a loggia supported by Corinthian columns, wrought iron railings and window bars, a molded belt course between the building's two stories, a projecting bracketed cornice, and a red tile roof. The post office was built toward the end of the Beaux-Arts phase of federal building design, as government architects shifted to a "starved classicism" style in the ensuing years.

The building was added to the National Register of Historic Places on December 3, 1985 as the U.S. Post Office—Yuma Main. It was purchased by the Gowan Company in 1996 for preservation and use as its headquarters.

== See also ==
- National Register of Historic Places listings in Yuma County, Arizona
- List of historic properties in Yuma, Arizona
- List of United States post offices
