= Brown House (Yuma, Arizona) =

Historic house in Arizona, United States

- U.S. National Register of Historic Places
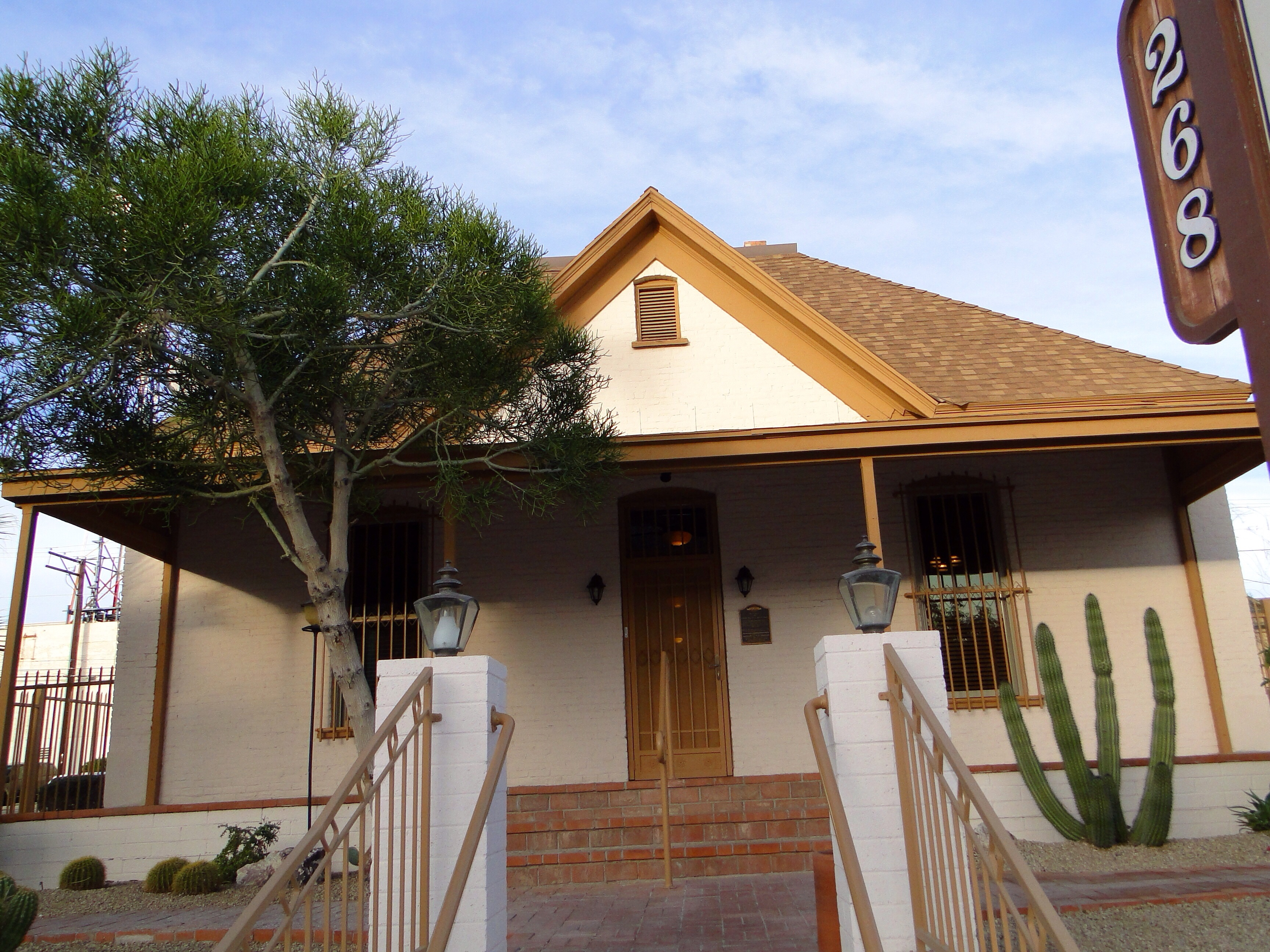
- Brown House, Feb. 2014

- Location within Arizona Location within the United States
- Location: 268 S. 1st Ave., Yuma, Arizona
- Coordinates: 32°43′20″N 114°37′13″W
- Built: 1893
- Built by: F.B. Wightman
- MPS: Yuma MRA
- NRHP reference No.: 82001626
- Added to NRHP: December 7, 1982

The Brown House is a late 19th-century house in Yuma, Arizona, built of brick in the 1893.

Built in 1893 by F. B. Wightman, the house was recognized in 1982 as "a well preserved example of a lodging house from the turn of the century." It served primarily as a stopover for railroad workers traveling between Los Angeles and Tucson. In 1907, C. L. Brown acquired the property and used it as a family residence until 1943. Excepti for reshingling the roof and enclosing the breezeway between the kitchen and the main building, the structure remains largely unchanged from its original appearance. Situated on a rise at the south end of the historic district, the house is considered a prominent local landmark."

The house was added on the U.S. National Register of Historic Places in 1982. It may also be a contributing property to the Yuma Crossing and Associated Sites, a designated U.S. National Historic Landmark.

== See also ==
- List of historic properties in Yuma, Arizona
- National Register of Historic Places listings in Yuma County, Arizona
