= Methodist Episcopal Church (Yuma, Arizona) =

Historic church in Arizona, United States

- U.S. National Register of Historic Places
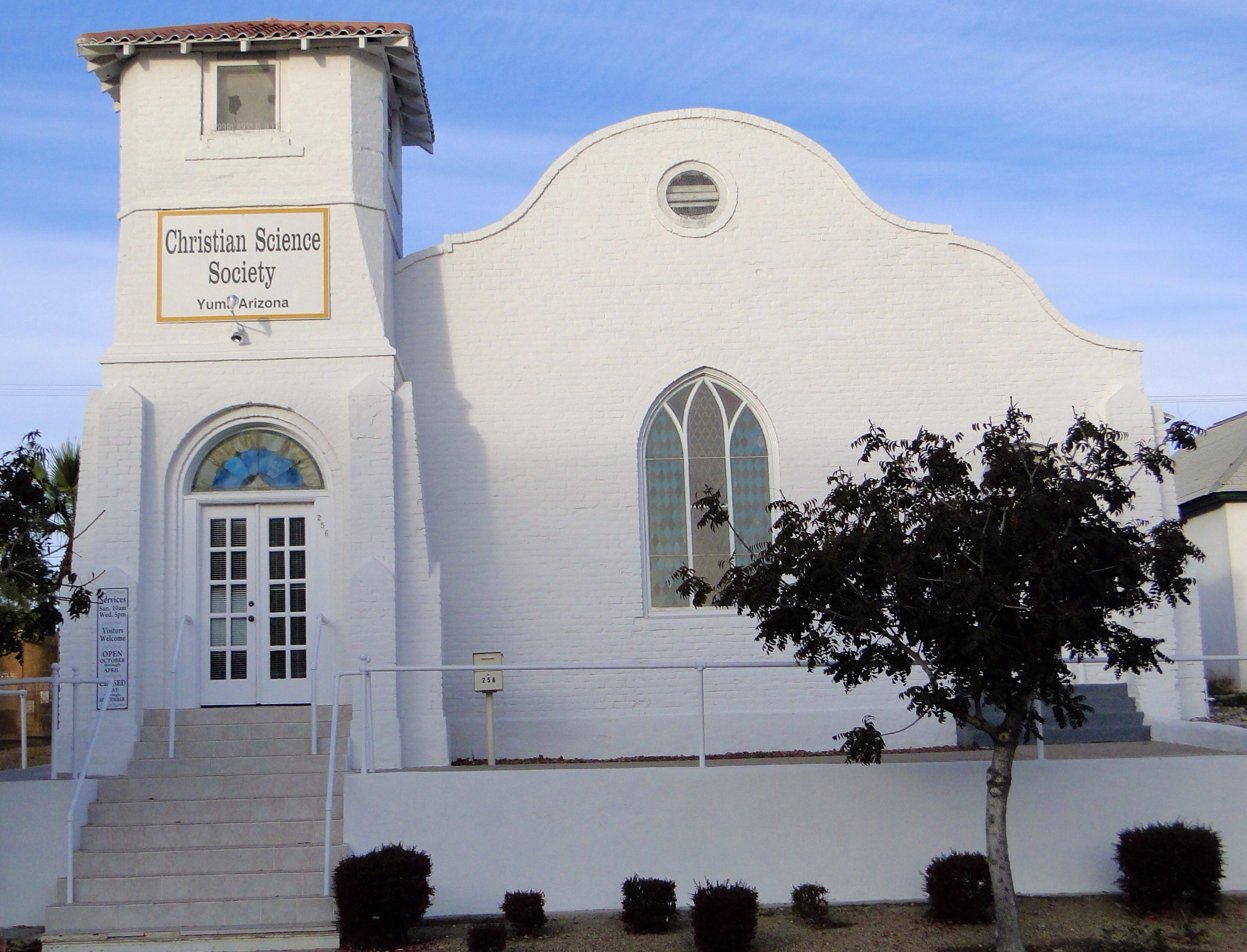

- Location within Arizona Location within the United States
- Location: 256 S. 1st Ave., Yuma, Arizona
- Coordinates: 32°43′20″N 114°37′13″W
- Area: less than one acre
- Built: 1905
- Architectural style: Mission Revival / Spanish Colonial Revival
- MPS: Yuma MRA
- NRHP reference No.: 82001645
- Added to NRHP: December 7, 1982

The Methodist Episcopal Church is a historic Methodist Episcopal church, located at 256 S. 1st Avenue in Yuma, Arizona. It was long home to the Christian Science Society – Yuma, starting in 1946. The building is currently an event venue.

The Mission Revival Style church was built in 1905.

It was added to the National Register of Historic Places in 1982.

== See also ==
- List of historic properties in Yuma, Arizona
- National Register of Historic Places listings in Yuma County, Arizona
