= Balsz House =

- U.S. National Register of Historic Places
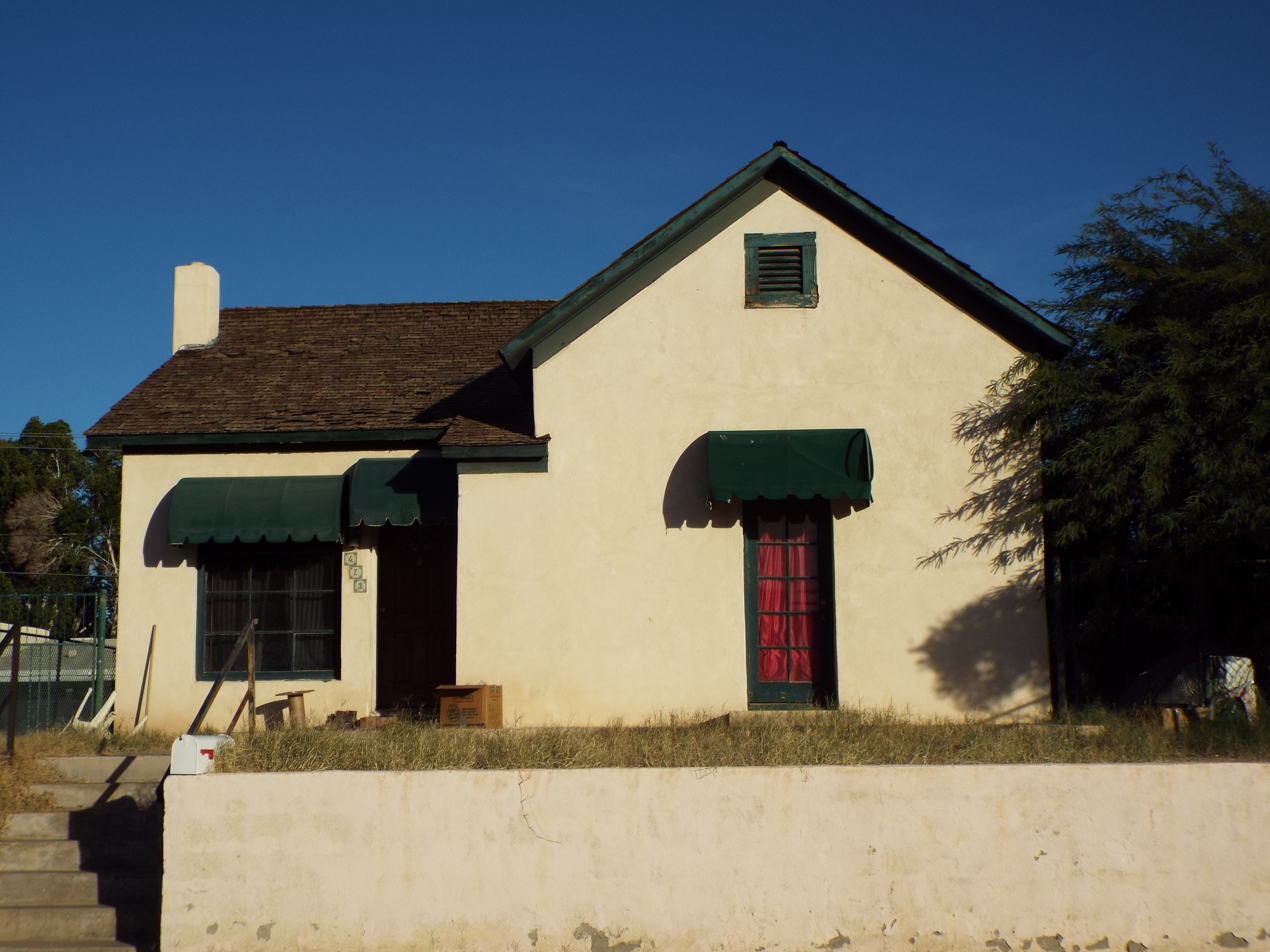
- The house in 2018

- Location within Arizona
- Location: 475 2nd Avenue, Yuma, Arizona
- Coordinates: 32°43′08″N 114°37′18″W
- Area: less than one acre
- Built: 1899
- MPS: Yuma MRA
- NRHP reference No.: 82001624
- Added to NRHP: December 7, 1982

The Balsz House is a historic adobe house in Yuma, Arizona. It was built in 1899 by Harry Neahr, and it belonged to the Balsz family from 1919 to 1976. The Balszes worked in the meat industry. The house is "a well preserved example of middle class housing in Yuma at the turn of the century." It has been listed on the National Register of Historic Places since December 7, 1982.
