= Jerry Kent House =

- U.S. National Register of Historic Places
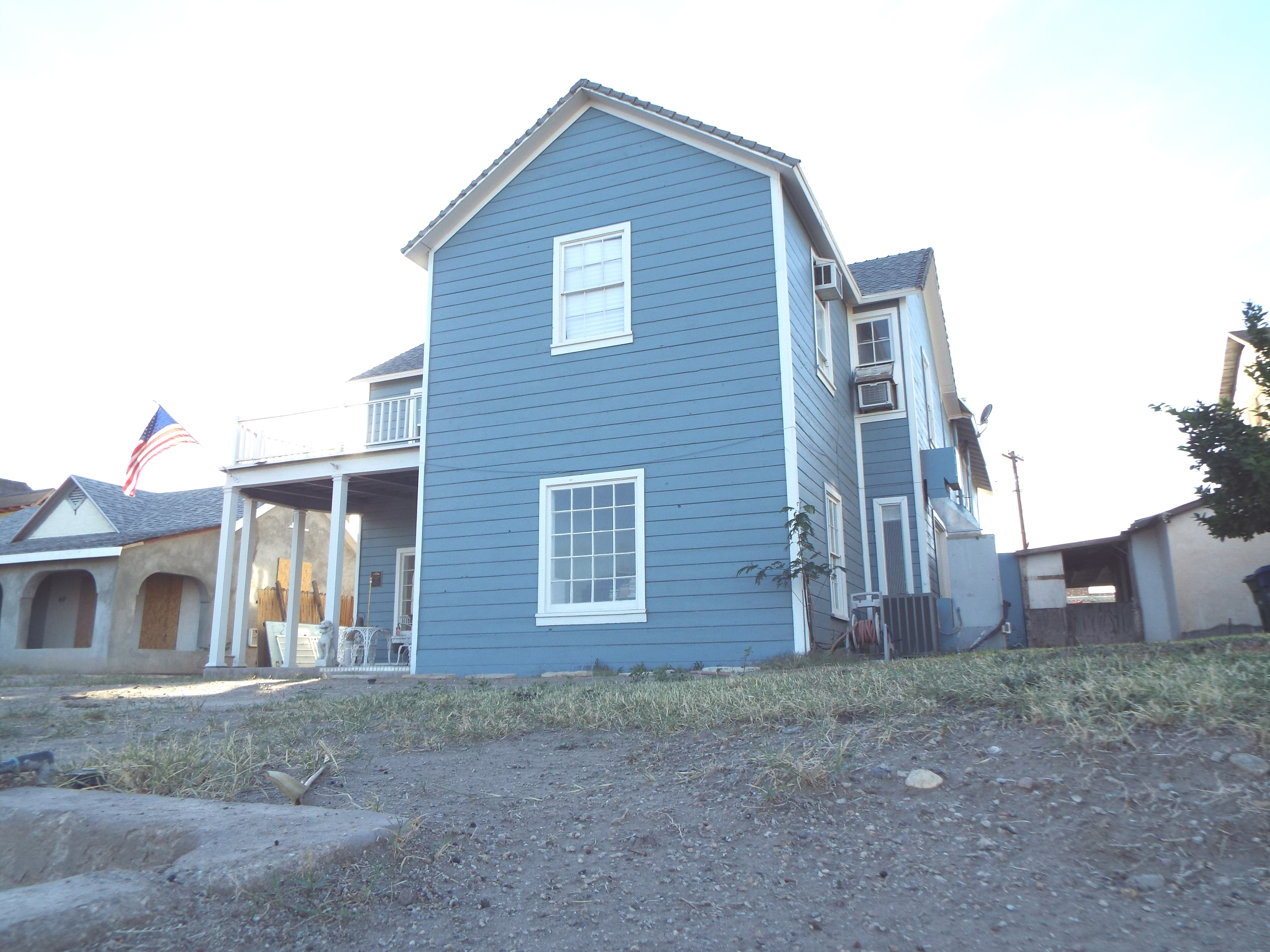
- The house in 2018

- Location within Arizona
- Location: 450 3rd Avenue, Yuma, Arizona
- Coordinates: 32°43′07″N 114°37′24″W
- Area: less than one acre
- Built: 1905
- Architectural style: Classical Revival
- MPS: Yuma MRA
- NRHP reference No.: 82001641
- Added to NRHP: December 7, 1982

The Jerry Kent House is a historic house in Yuma, Arizona. It was built in 1905 for Jennie Kent, a schoolteacher. It was purchased by J. P. Yemen, a dentist, in 1920. The house was designed in the Classical Revival architectural style. It has been listed on the National Register of Historic Places since December 7, 1982.
