= Cactus Press-Plaza Paint Building =

- Cactus Press--Plaza Paint Building
- U.S. National Register of Historic Places
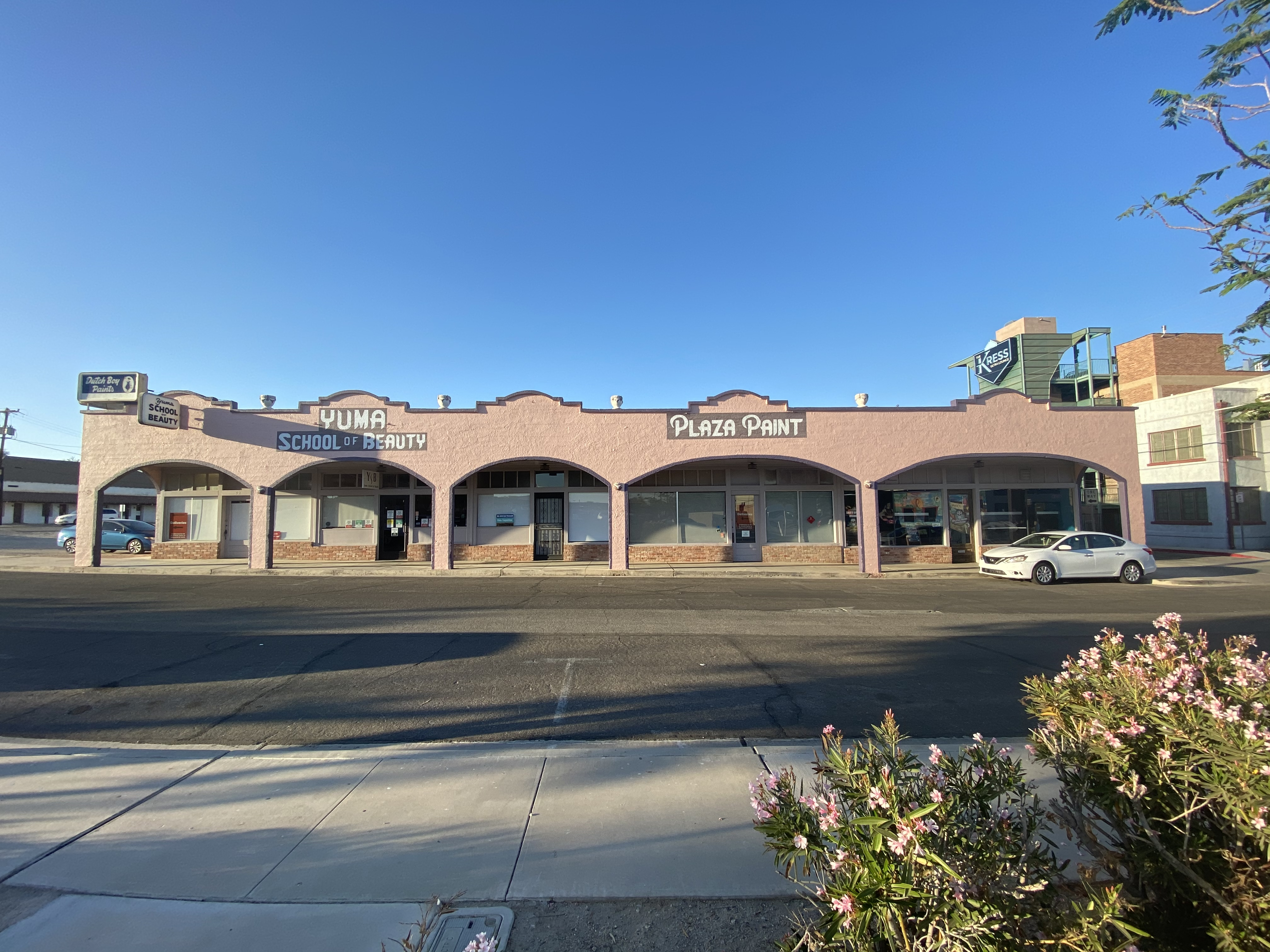
- The building in 2020

- Location within Arizona
- Location: 30–54 East Third Street, Yuma, Arizona
- Coordinates: 32°43′21″N 114°37′06″W
- Area: 1.1 acres (0.45 ha)
- Architectural style: Spanish Colonial Revival
- MPS: Yuma MRA
- NRHP reference No.: 87000613
- Added to NRHP: April 24, 1987

The Cactus Press-Plaza Paint Building is a historic building with an arcada in Yuma, Arizona. It was built in 1927, and designed in the Spanish Colonial Revival architectural style. It is "the only single story arcaded, poured concrete commercial structure extant in the Main Street area," and the style is typical of traditional shopping arcades in the Southwestern United States. The structure has been listed on the National Register of Historic Places since April 24, 1987.
