= Frank Ewing House =

Historic house in Arizona, United States

- U.S. National Register of Historic Places
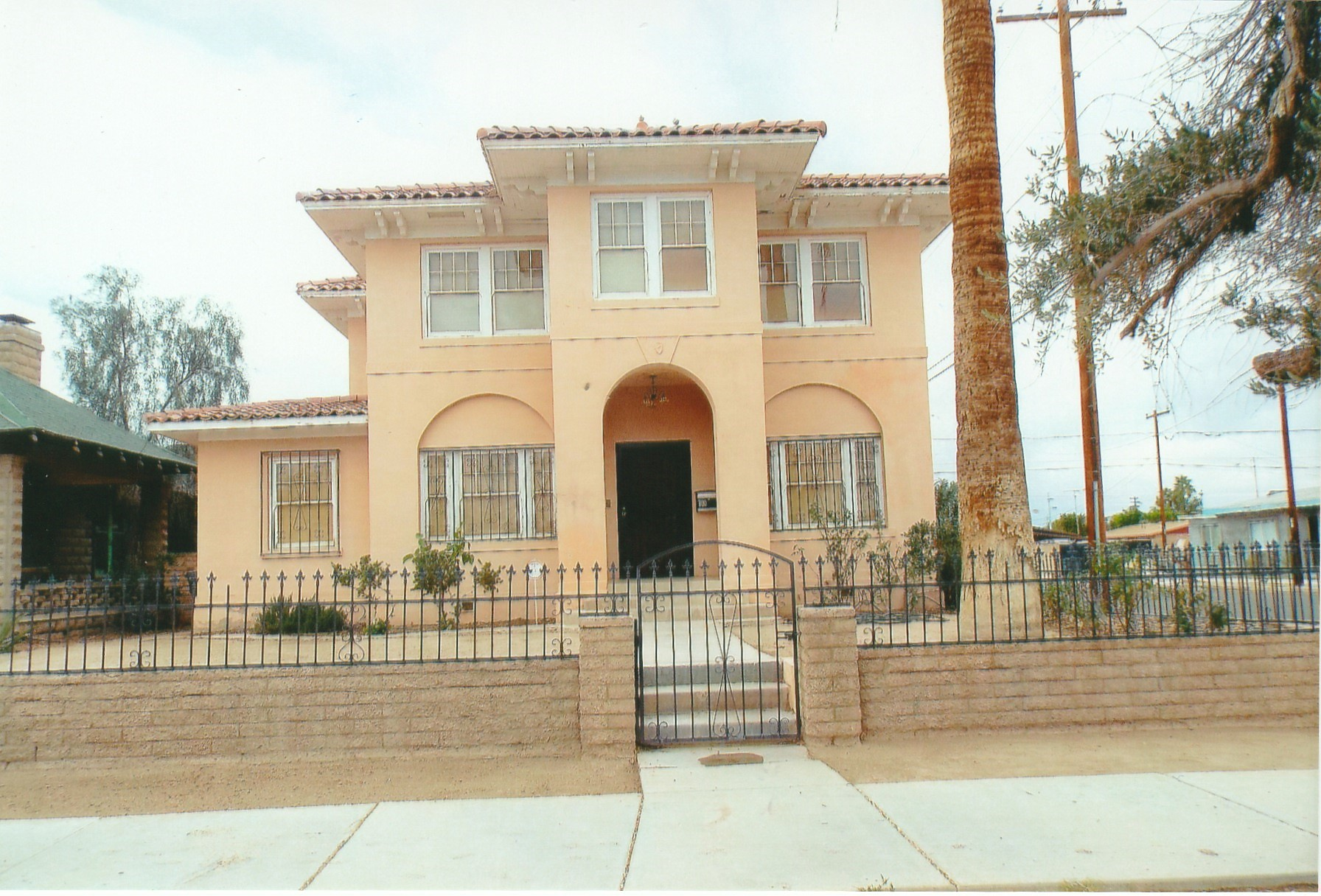

- Location within Arizona
- Location: 700 2nd Avenue, Yuma, Arizona
- Coordinates: 32.714162°N 114.622367°W
- Area: less than one acre
- Built: 1920
- Architectural style: Mission/spanish Revival
- MPS: Yuma MRA
- NRHP reference No.: 82001632
- Added to NRHP: December 7, 1982

The Frank Ewing House is a historic house in Yuma, Arizona. It was built in 1920 for Frank L. Ewing, a businessman.

The house was designed in the Spanish Colonial Revival architectural style. It has been listed on the National Register of Historic Places since December 7, 1982.
