= Brownstetter House =

- U.S. National Register of Historic Places
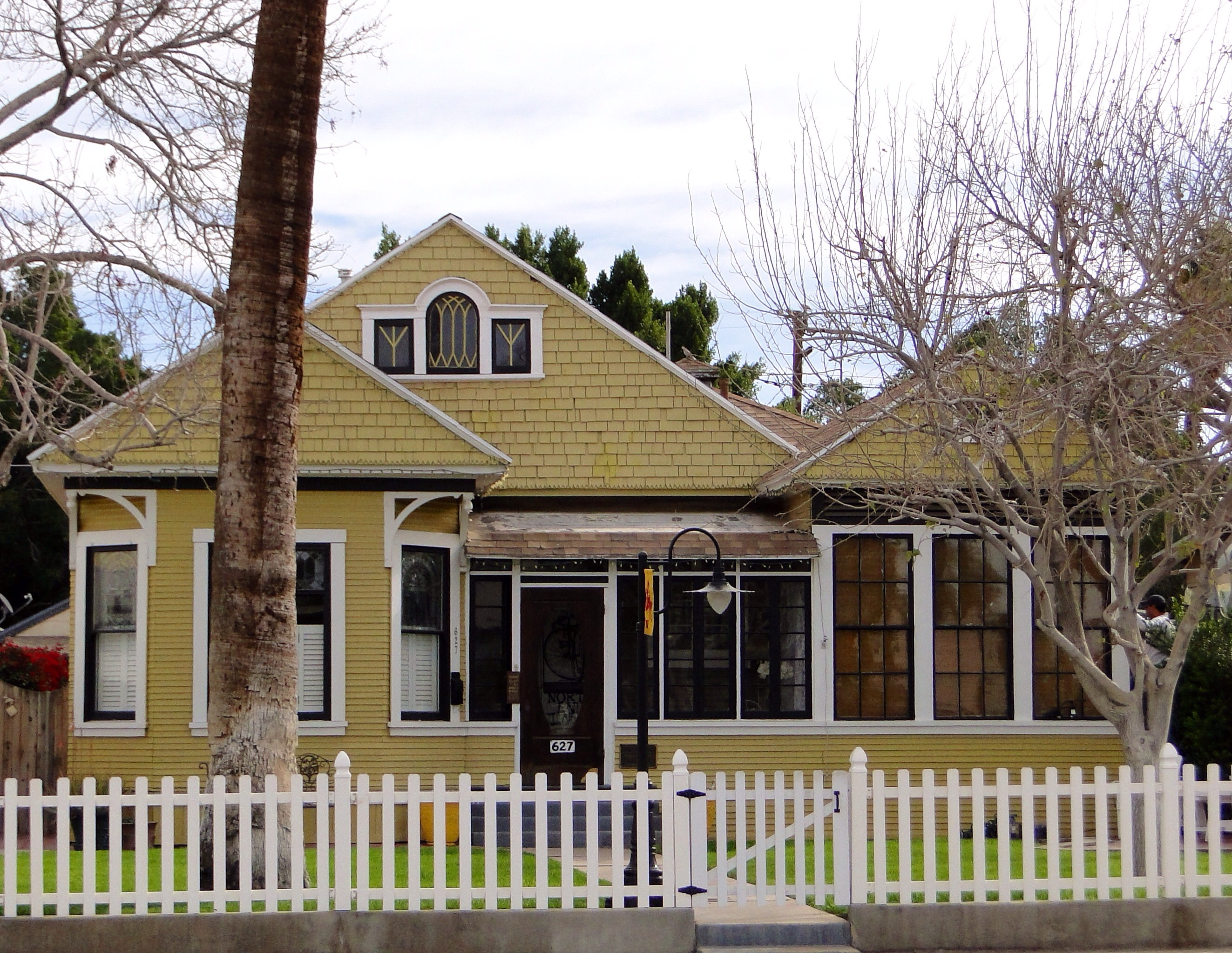
- The house in 2014

- Location within Arizona
- Location: 627 Orange Avenue, Yuma, Arizona
- Coordinates: 32°42′56″N 114°37′34″W
- Area: less than one acre
- Built: 1909
- Architectural style: Bungalow/craftsman
- MPS: Yuma MRA
- NRHP reference No.: 82001627
- Added to NRHP: December 7, 1982

The Brownstetter House is a historic house in Yuma, Arizona. It was built in 1909. From 1912 to 1949, it belonged to Harry Brownstetter, "a successful merchant, real estate developer, and financier." The house was designed in the American Craftsman and the Victorian architectural styles.

Its roof has three front-facing gables, the central one holding a Palladian window.

It has been listed on the National Register of Historic Places since December 7, 1982.
