= J. Homer Smith House =

United States historic place in Yuma County, Arizona

- U.S. National Register of Historic Places
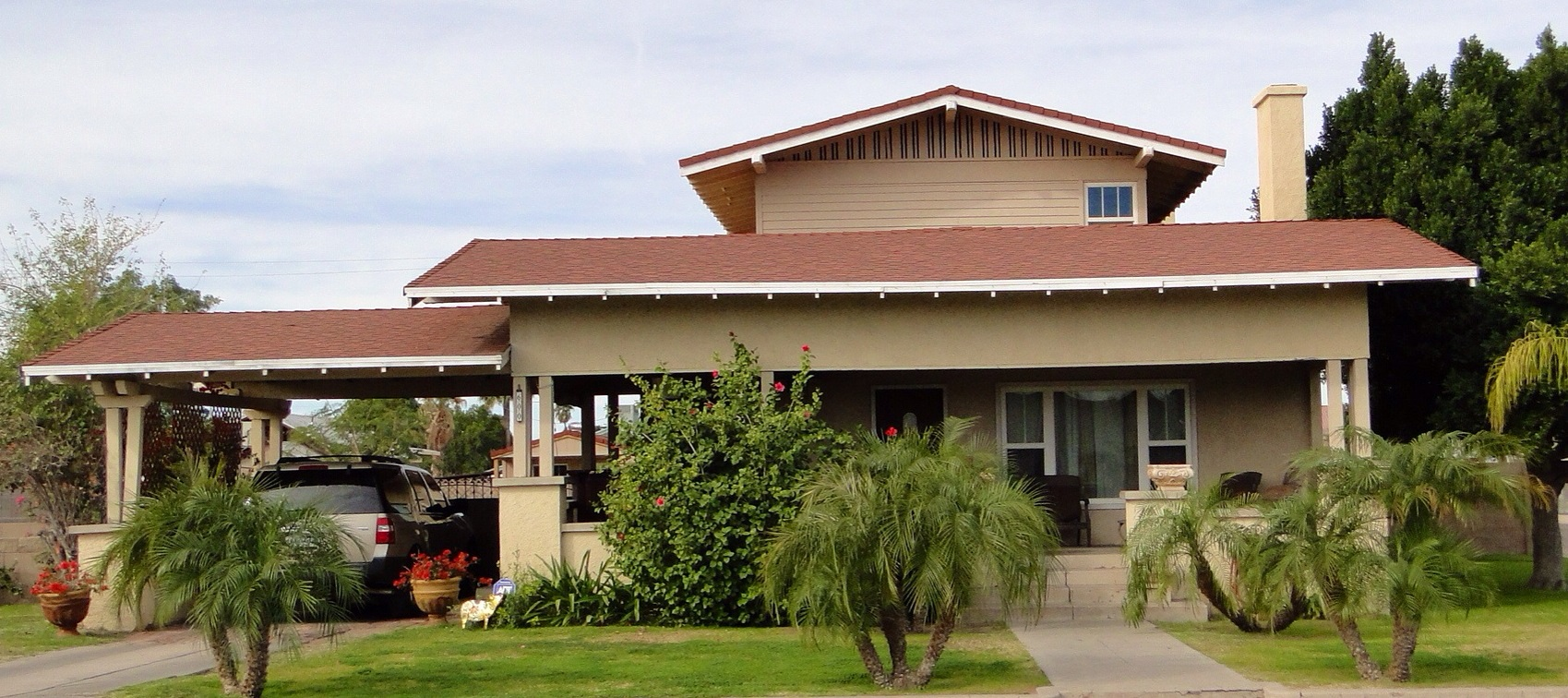
- The house in 2014

- Location within Arizona
- Location: 600 5th Avenue, Yuma, Arizona
- Coordinates: 32°42′57″N 114°37′29″W
- Area: less than one acre
- Built: 1917
- Architectural style: Bungalow/craftsman
- MPS: Yuma MRA
- NRHP reference No.: 82001658
- Added to NRHP: December 7, 1982

The J. Homer Smith is a historic house in Yuma, Arizona. It was built in 1917 for J. Homer Smith, a druggist and banker who served as the mayor of Yuma. He later moved to Tucson, and he died in 1936. The house was designed in the American Craftsman architectural style. It has been listed on the National Register of Historic Places since December 7, 1982.
