= Hotel del Ming =

Historic hospital in arizona

- U.S. National Register of Historic Places
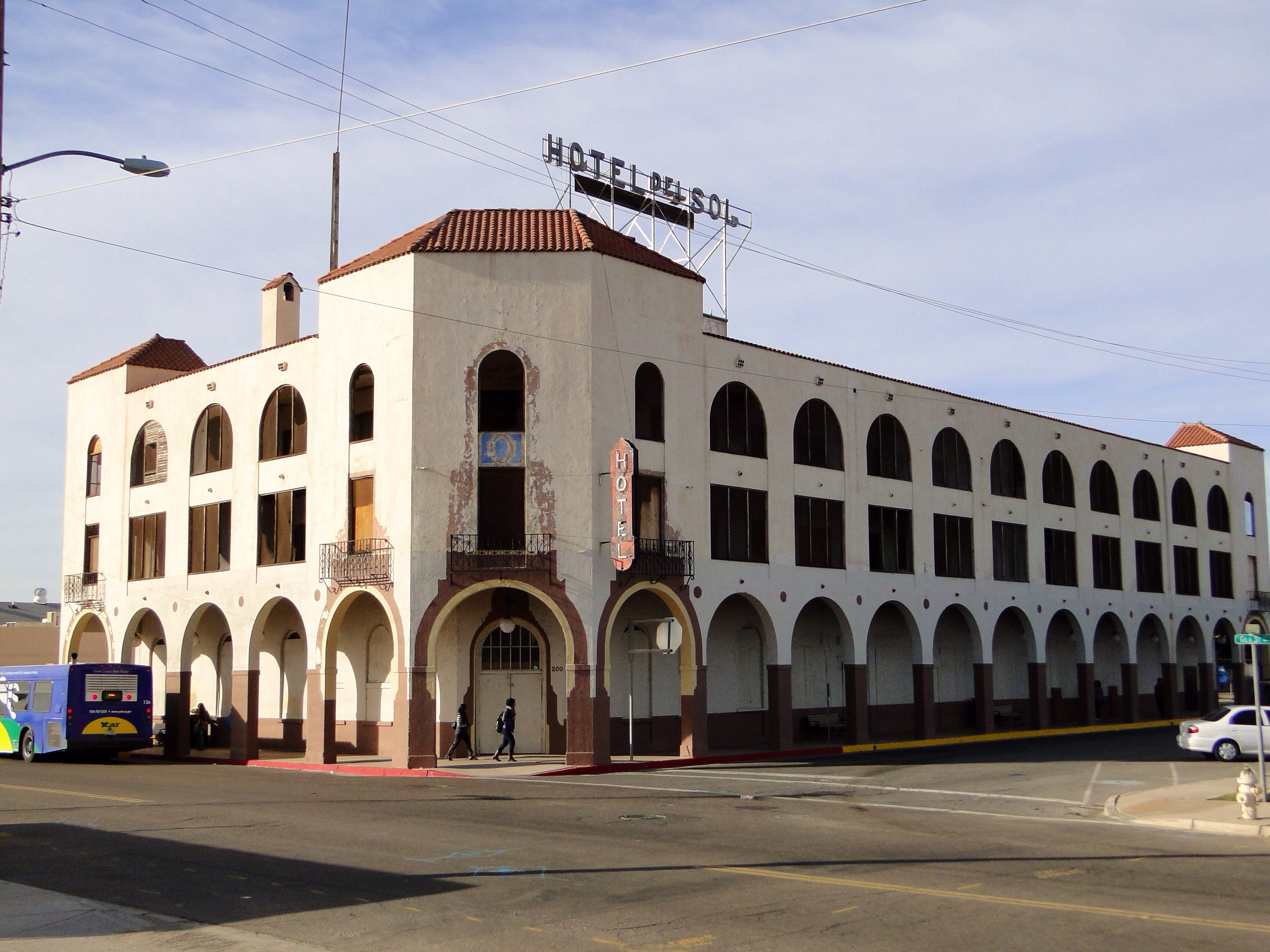
- The hotel in 2014

- Location within Arizona
- Location: 300 Gila Street, Yuma, Arizona
- Coordinates: 32°43′21″N 114°36′56″W
- Area: less than one acre
- Built: 1926; 100 years ago
- Architect: Taylor & Taylor
- Architectural style: Mission/spanish Revival
- MPS: Yuma MRA
- NRHP reference No.: 82001639
- Added to NRHP: December 7, 1982

The Hotel del Ming is a historic hotel in Yuma, Arizona. It was built in 1926. The hotel was dedicated on December 20, 1926. It was designed in the Spanish Revival architectural style by Taylor & Taylor, two architects from Los Angeles, California. It has been listed on the National Register of Historic Places since December 7, 1982.
