= Mexican Consulate (Yuma, Arizona) =

- U.S. National Register of Historic Places
- Location within Arizona
- Location: 129 West 4th Street, Yuma, Arizona
- Coordinates: 32°43′11″N 114°37′16″W
- Area: less than one acre
- Built: 1892
- Architectural style: Cottage
- MPS: Yuma MRA
- NRHP reference No.: 82001647
- Added to NRHP: December 7, 1982

The Mexican Consulate is a historic adobe house in Yuma, Arizona. It was built circa 1892 for Dionicio Sanchez and his wife, Mary. In 1897, it was purchased by John Stoffela, who rented it to Henry M. Gandolfo, the Mexican consul, in the 1900s. The house housed the Mexican consulate in Yuma while Gandolfo resided there. It remained in the Stoffela family until 1978. It has been listed on the National Register of Historic Places since December 7, 1982.
