= Masonic Temple (Yuma, Arizona) =

- U.S. National Register of Historic Places
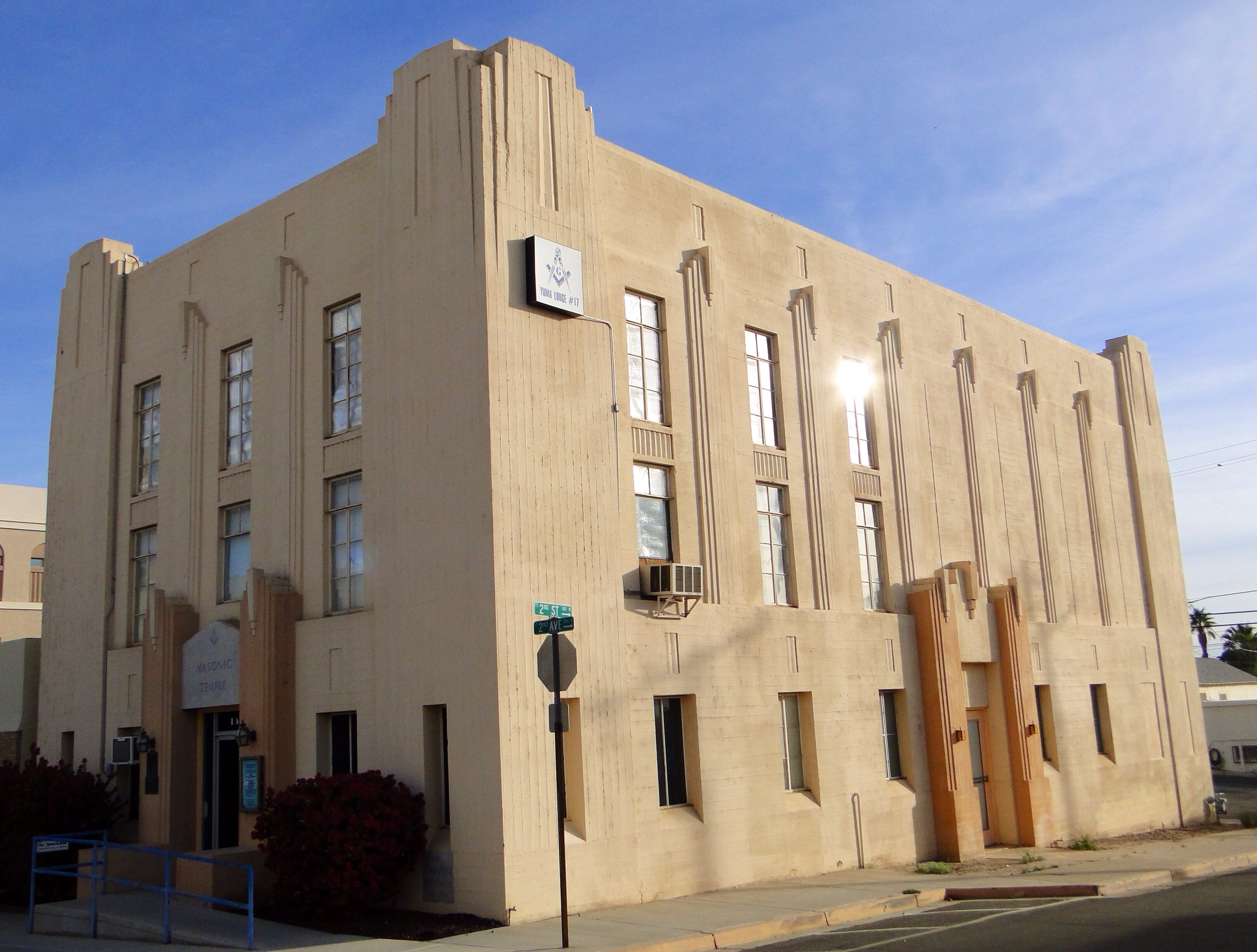

- Location within Arizona Location within the United States
- Location: 153 S. 2nd Ave., Yuma, Arizona
- Coordinates: 32°43′29″N 114°37′18″W
- Area: 0.9 acres (0.36 ha)
- Built: 1931
- Architect: Edward Gray Taylor; Ellis Wing Taylor
- Architectural style: Art Deco Streamline Moderne
- MPS: Yuma MRA
- NRHP reference No.: 84000752
- Added to NRHP: April 12, 1984

The Masonic Temple in Yuma, Arizona, was built in 1931 in the late Art Deco style of Moderne. It was designed by Los Angeles–based architects Edward Gray Taylor and Ellis Wing Taylor. In 1933, at the depth of the Great Depression, the Masonic lodge lost all its funds in a bank closure. On November 16, 1933, the building's ownership was turned over to the Pacific Mutual Life Insurance Company "in satisfaction of a $16,900 realty mortgage." It was later rented back to the Masonic chapter and on May 10, 1940, ownership was restored.

It is significant as one of few major Modernist Art Deco Style buildings surviving in Yuma. It was given a "substantive review" indicating historical merit in the Yuma Multiple Resource Area MPS of 1979. The Masonic Temple was listed on the National Register of Historic Places in 1984.

== See also ==
- List of historic properties in Yuma, Arizona
- National Register of Historic Places listings in Yuma County, Arizona
