= Caruthers House =

- U.S. National Register of Historic Places
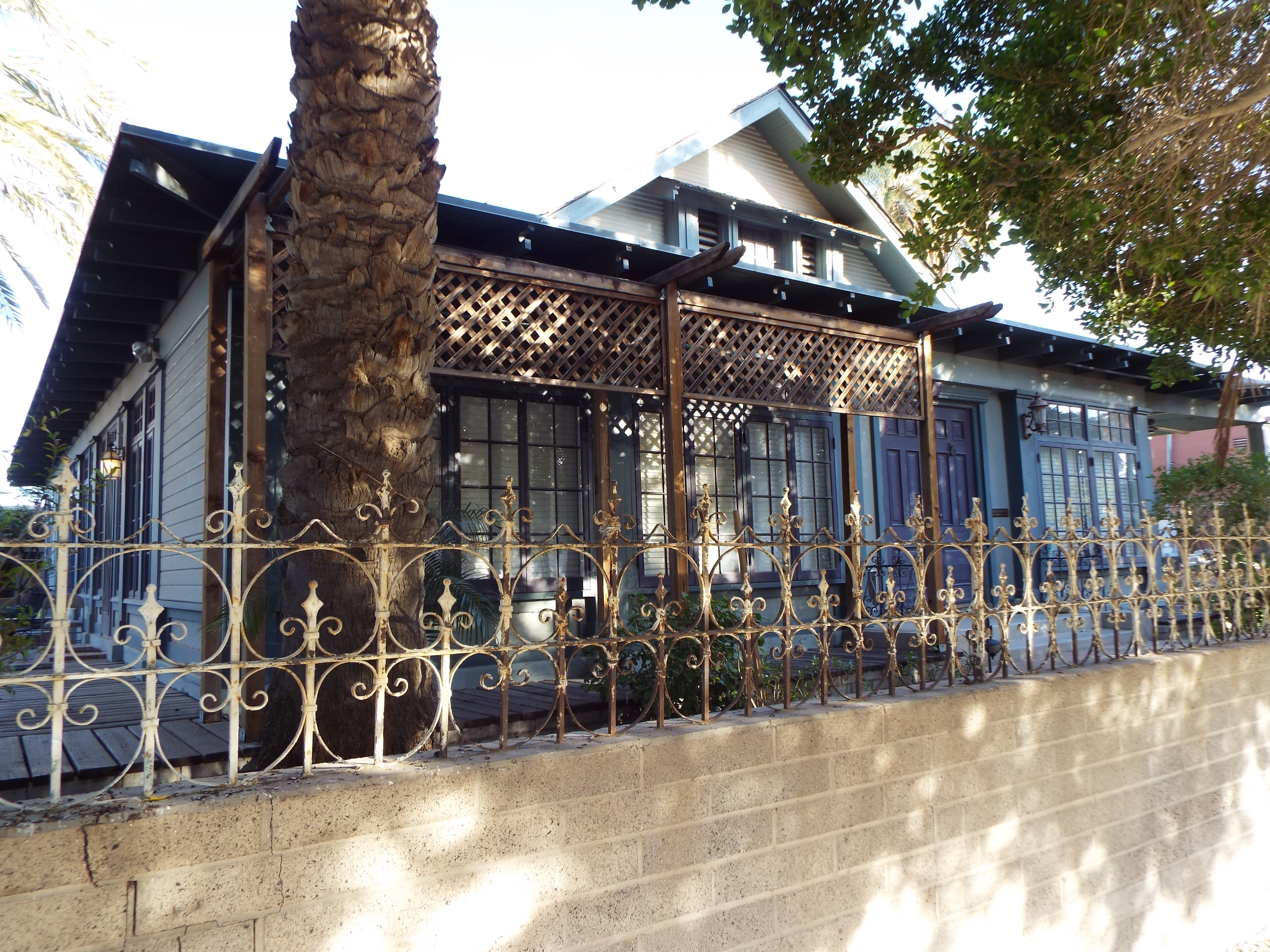
- The house in 2018

- Location within Arizona
- Location: 441 2nd Avenue, Yuma, Arizona
- Coordinates: 32°43′09″N 114°37′20″W
- Area: less than one acre
- Built: 1895, 1906
- Architectural style: Bungalow/craftsman
- Part of: Yuma Century Heights Conservancy Residential Historic District
- MPS: Yuma MRA
- NRHP reference No.: 82001628
- Added to NRHP: December 7, 1982

The Caruthers House is a historic house in Yuma, Arizona. It was built in 1895 for F. B. Logan and was extensively remodeled in 1906. It was purchased by C. E. Eichelberger in 1900, and by E. G. Caruthers in 1906. The latter was a banker. The house was designed in the American Craftsman architectural style. It has been listed on the National Register of Historic Places since December 7, 1982.

It is also a contributing building in the Yuma Century Heights Conservancy Residential Historic District.
