= St. Paul's Episcopal Church (Yuma, Arizona) =

Historic church in Arizona, United States

- U.S. National Register of Historic Places
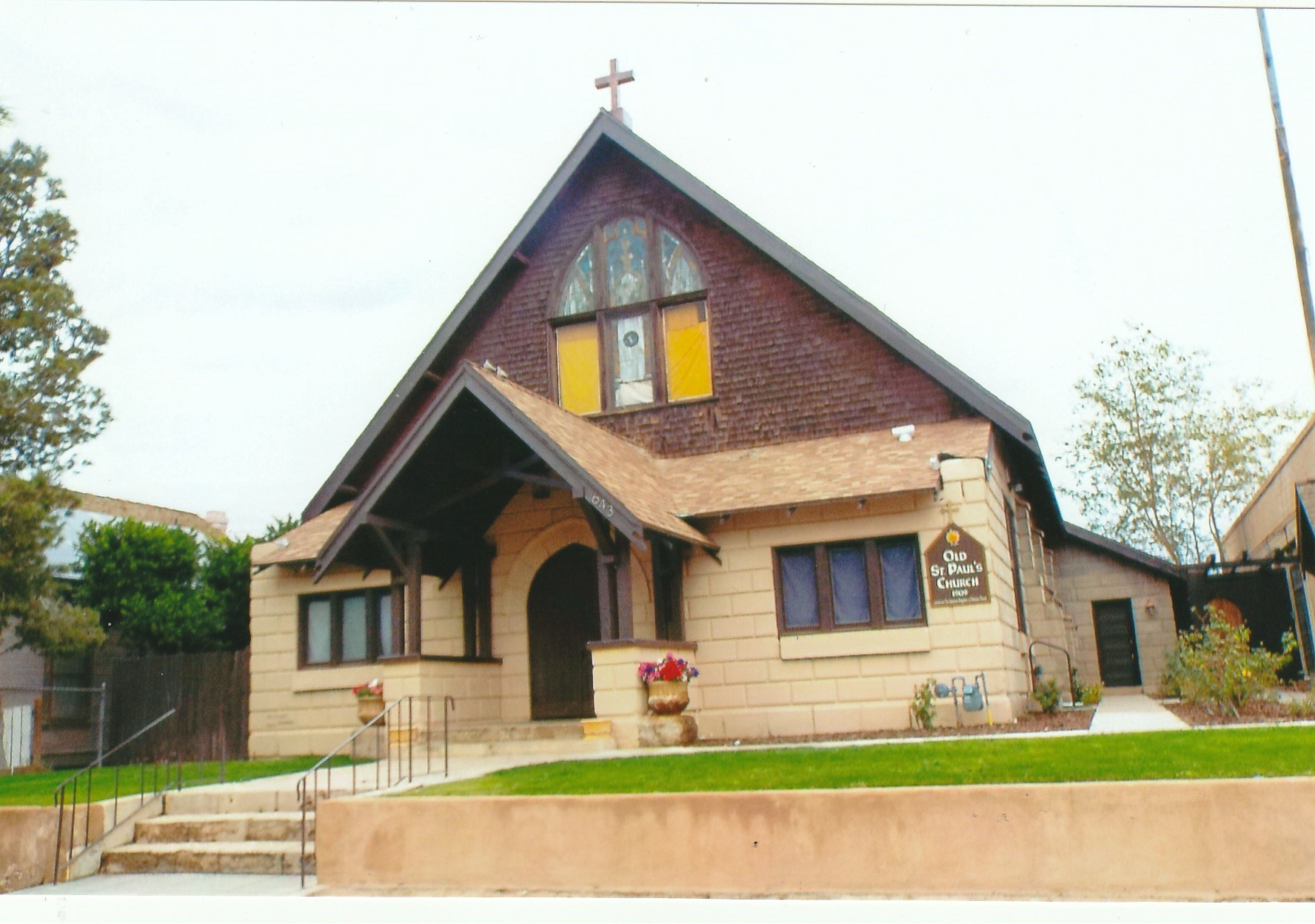
- St. Paul’s Episcopal Church

- Location within Arizona Location within the United States
- Location: 637 2nd Ave., Yuma, Arizona
- Coordinates: 32°42′54″N 114°37′16″W
- Area: less than one acre
- Built: 1909
- Architectural style: Late 19th and Early 20th Century American Movements
- MPS: Yuma MRA
- NRHP reference No.: 82001657
- Added to NRHP: December 7, 1982

St. Paul's Episcopal Church is a historic church at 637 2nd Avenue in Yuma, Arizona, United States. It was built in 1909 and added to the National Register of Historic Places in 1982. It currently serves as a cultural center.

Its Arizona State historic property registration describes it:

Stylistically, St. Paul's Episcopal Church is unique among the institutional structures in Yuma. Its most distinctive features include a broad shingled roof, rusticated masonry base, and articulated framing in the porch – all characteristics of the Shingle Style and its derivative the Western Stick Style. As both of these styles are more commonly associated with residential design its use for St. Paul's is exceptional. However, since the church is situated in the midst of a residential area with many Bungaloid homes, the design) of the church was quite appropriate.

== See also ==
- List of historic properties in Yuma, Arizona
- National Register of Historic Places listings in Yuma County, Arizona
