= Brinley Avenue Historic District =

Historic district in Arizona, United States

- U.S. National Register of Historic Places
- U.S. Historic district
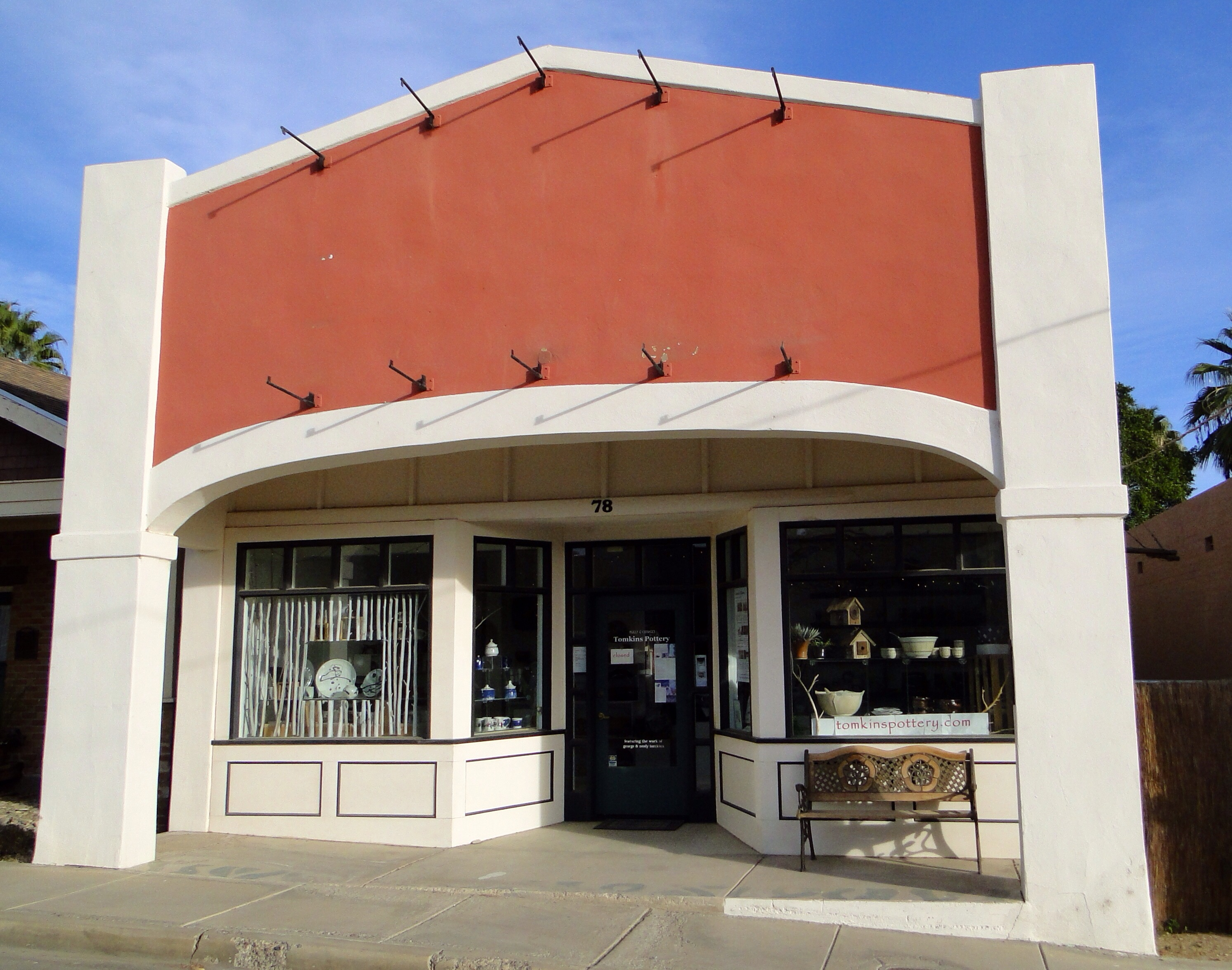
- Venegas Store

- Location within Arizona Location within the United States
- Location: 29-96 W. 2nd St., 198-200 S. Main, 201 S. 1st, and 102-298 Madison Aves., Yuma, Arizona
- Coordinates: 32.7241°N 114.61959°W
- Area: 8.4 acres (3.4 ha)
- MPS: Yuma MRA
- NRHP reference No.: 82001625
- Added to NRHP: December 7, 1982

The Brinley Avenue Historic District is a historic district in downtown Yuma, Arizona, that runs along Madison Avenue (formerly Brinley Avenue) from 1st to 3rd Streets and along Second Street from Main Street to 1st Avenue. The district connected Yuma's historic commercial center along Main Street with its government center on 2nd Avenue and was actively developed from 1900 to 1925. The district was added to the National Register of Historic Places in 1982 and is also included in the larger Yuma Crossing National Heritage Area.

The historic district includes 10 structures that have been designated as "significant" and 12 structures that have been designated as "contributing".

== Important structures ==
The structures designated as "significant" or "contributing" include:

- The Dorrington Block, 45 2nd Street (Yu203). This commercial arcade was built in 1908 in a Neo-Classical Revival style. Built on the site of J. W. Dorrington's office, print shop and home, it has been designated as a "significant" property to the district.
- Napoleon House, 96 2nd Street (Yu217). This adobe structure, built in 1901, is located at the western edge of the district along 2nd Street. It is an example of Anglicized Sonoran style architecture and has been designated as a "significant" structure as an example of middle class housing at the turn of the 20th century.
- Jagoda House, 94 2nd Street (Yu218). The brick structure has been designated as a "contributing" property.
- Ghiotto House, 90 2nd Street (Yu219). This brick home was built in 1915 for John Ghiotto an immigrant from Genoa, Italy, who first worked at the Gandolfo store and later operated four small grocery stores of his own. The structure has been designated as a "contributing" property as an example of typical middle class housing of the period.
- Venegas Store, 78 2nd Street (Yu220). This commercial structure was built in 1924 in the sheltered arcade style and operated by Jose Maria Venegas as a storehouse and dry goods store. It has been designated as a "significant" structure. The Venegas family also operated the Yuma Steam Laundry.
- Trautman Building, 190 Madison Avenue (Yu223). This commercial block was built in 1908 for J. W. Dorrington and leased to Ernest Trautman, a jeweler and optician. It has been designated as a "contributing" property.
- Mary Neahr Pancrazi House, a.k.a. the Pancrazi honeymoon cottage, 116 Madison Avenue (Yu225). This adobe house was built in 1899 by David Neahr for his daughter Fryda Mary Neahr upon her marriage to ferryman Mateo Pancrazi. It has been designated as a "contributing" property.
- Neahr-Iaeger-Martinez House, 106 Madison Avenue (Yu226). This adobe residence was built in approximately 1860. It has been the residence of (1) David Neahr, builder of the Yuma Territorial Prison, (2) Louis Iaeger, a Colorado River ferryman, and (3) Gabriel Martinez, namesake of Martinez Lake.
- Popular Drug Store, a.k.a. Golden Wedding Bell Marriage Chapel, 102 Madison Avenue (Yu227). This frame and stucco structure was built in 1891 and operated as a drug store from 1891 to 1914, the Yi-Lee Chinese Laundry in the 1920s, and as the Golden Wedding Bell Marriage Chapel from 1940 to 1957.
- Yuma County Administration Building, 198 S. Main Street (Yu231). Originally occupied by the Yuma National Bank, the building was rehabilitated and dedicated as the county administration building in 1990.

== Gallery ==
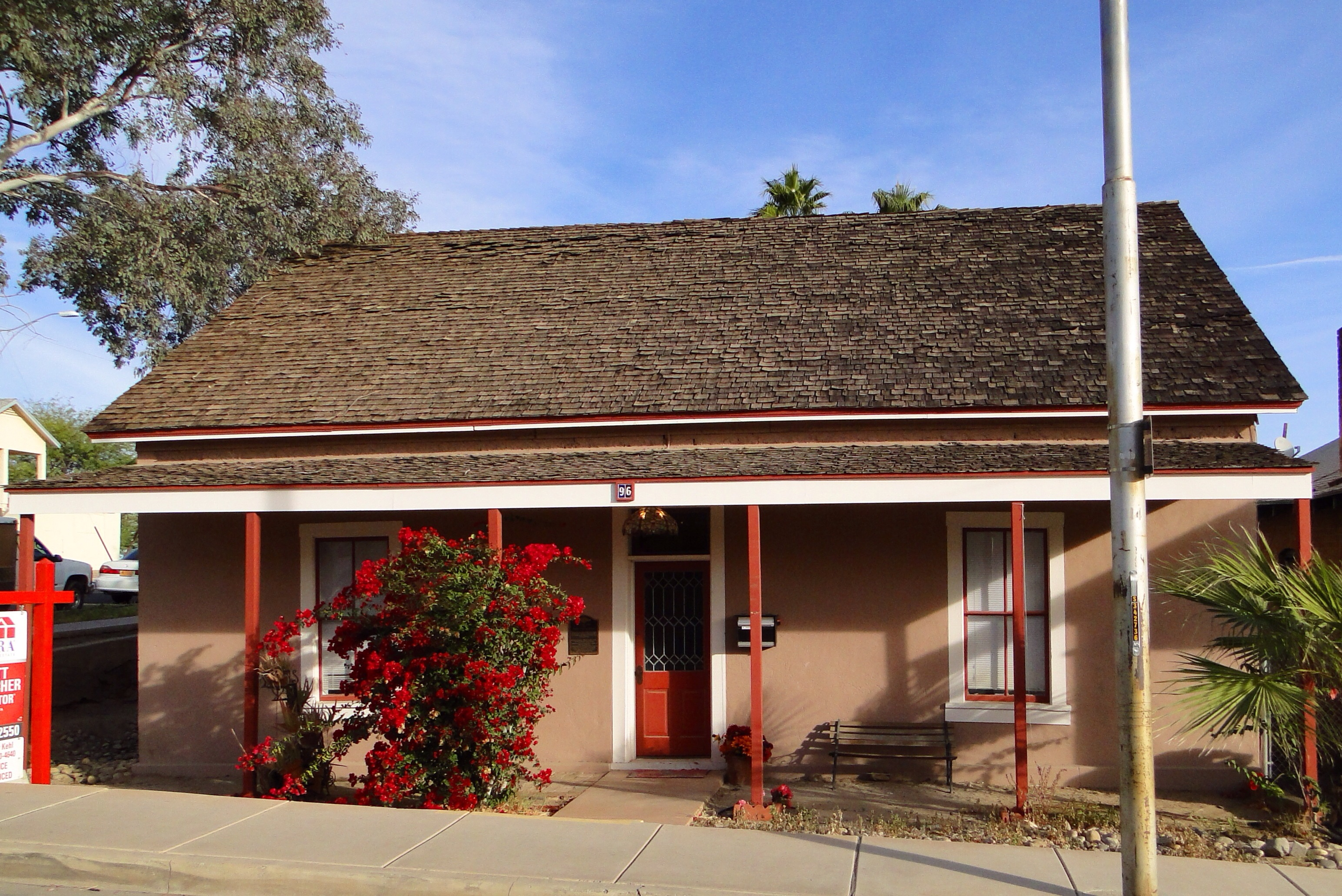
Napoleon House

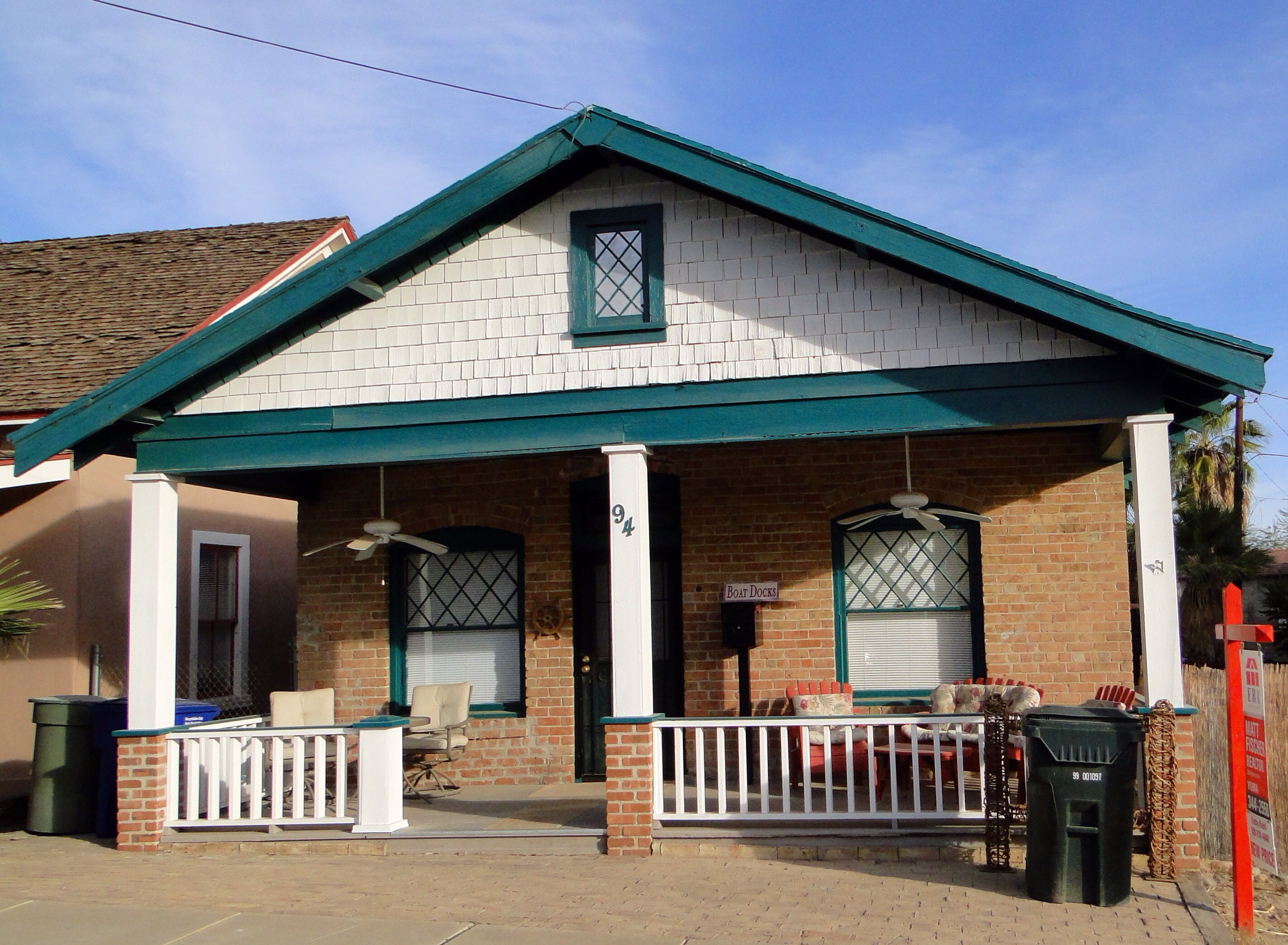
Jagoda House

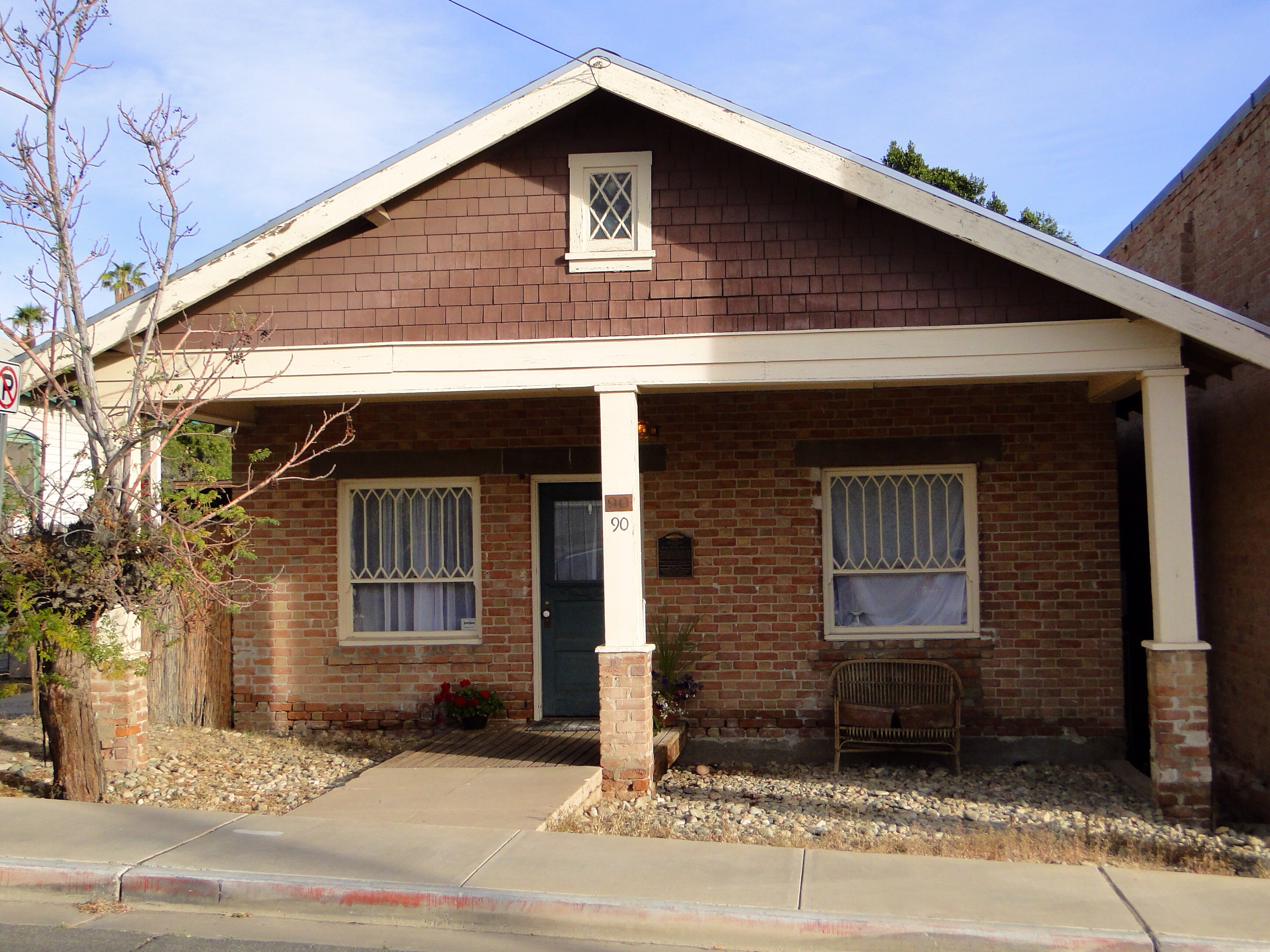
Ghiotto House

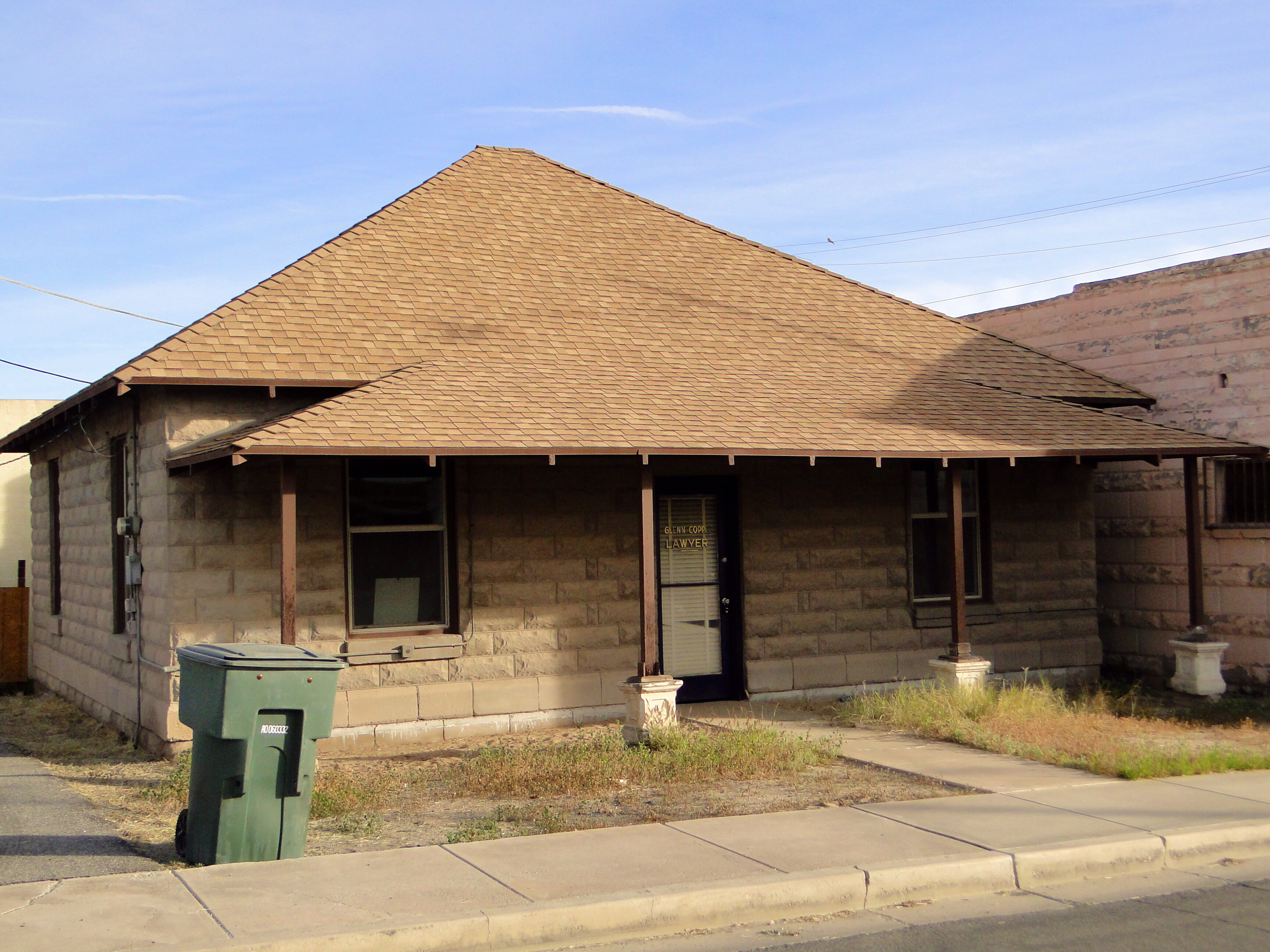
Glenn Copple Office

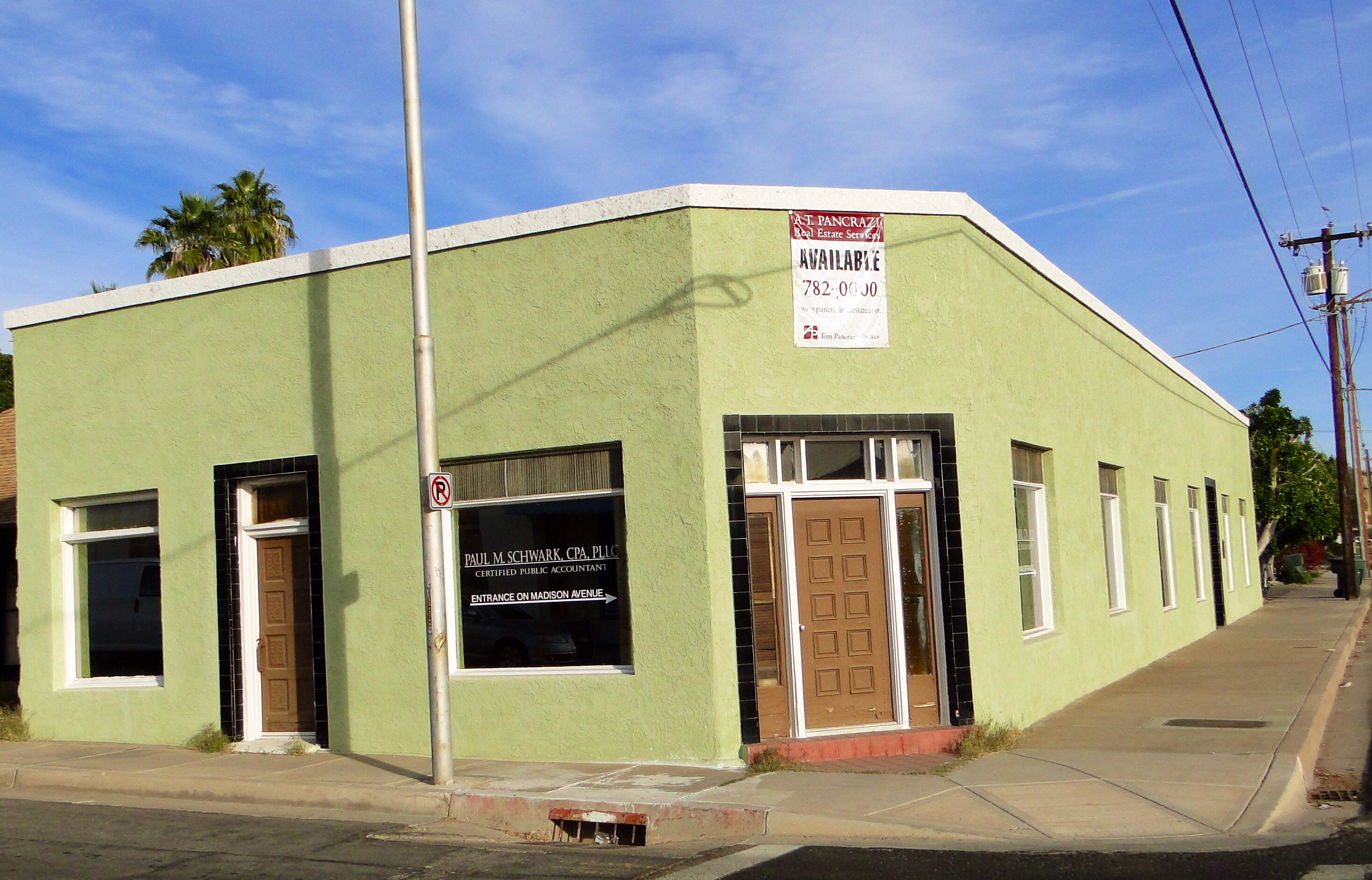
Trautman Building

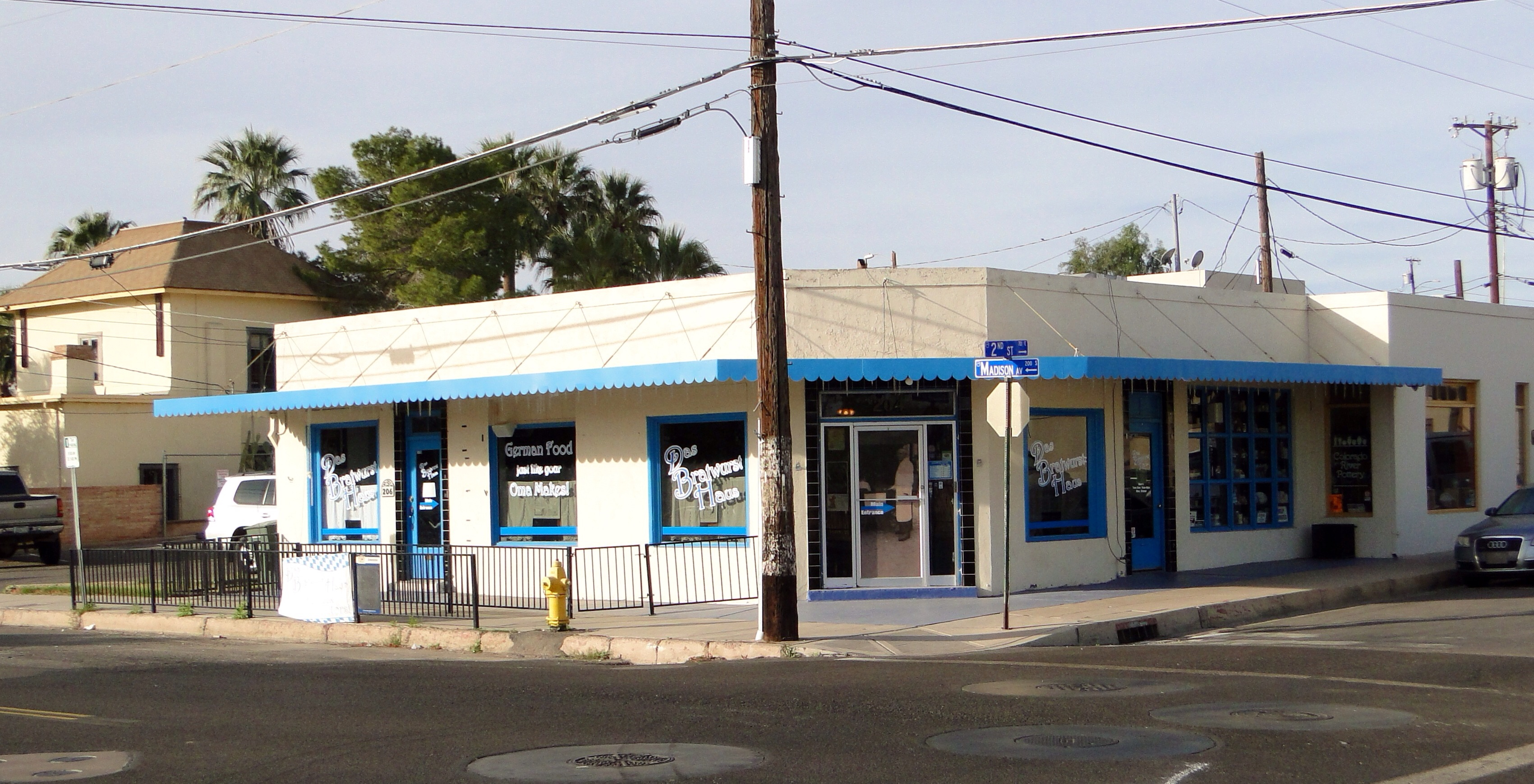
Das Bratwurst Haus

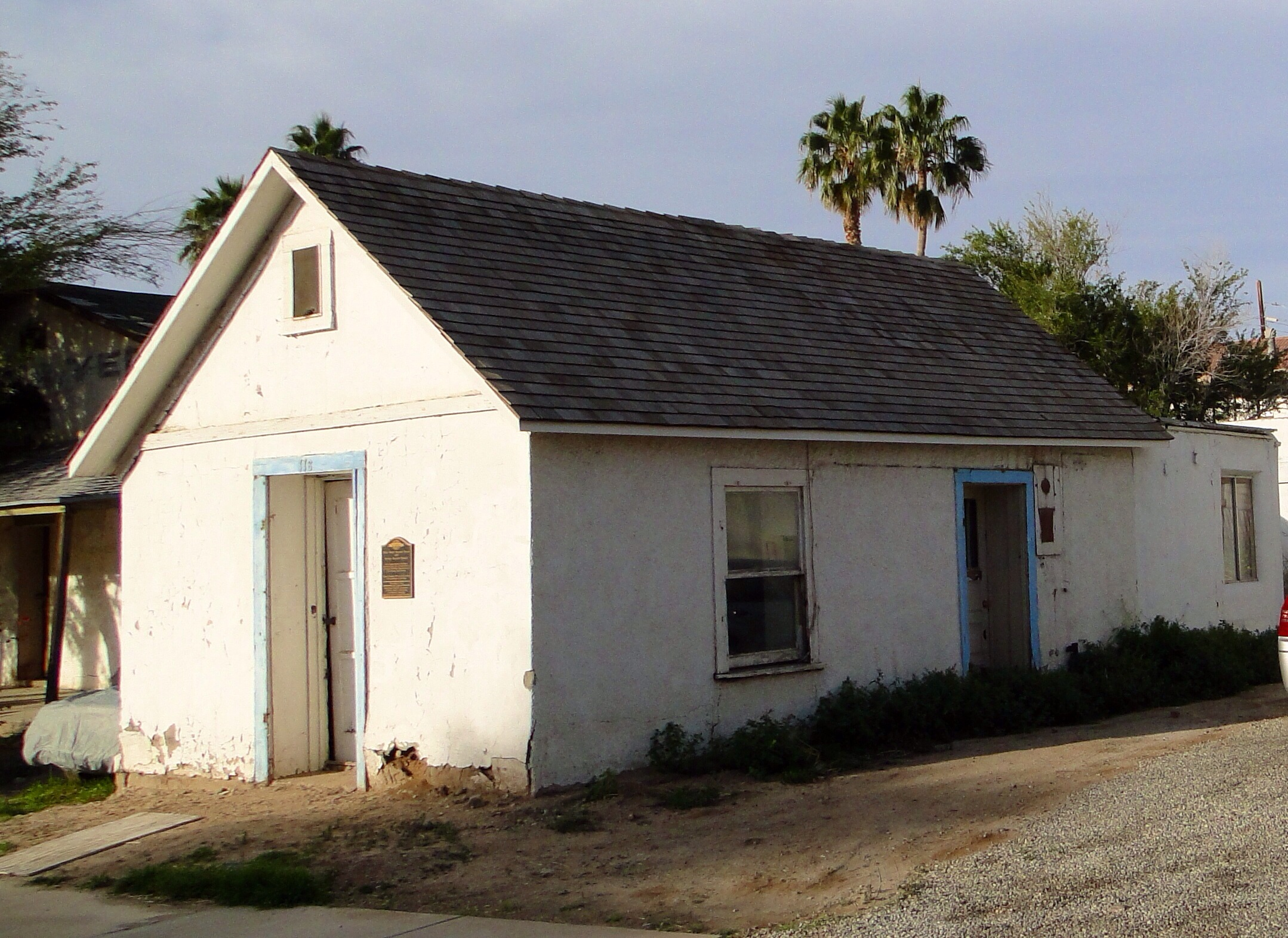
Mary Neahr Pancrazi House

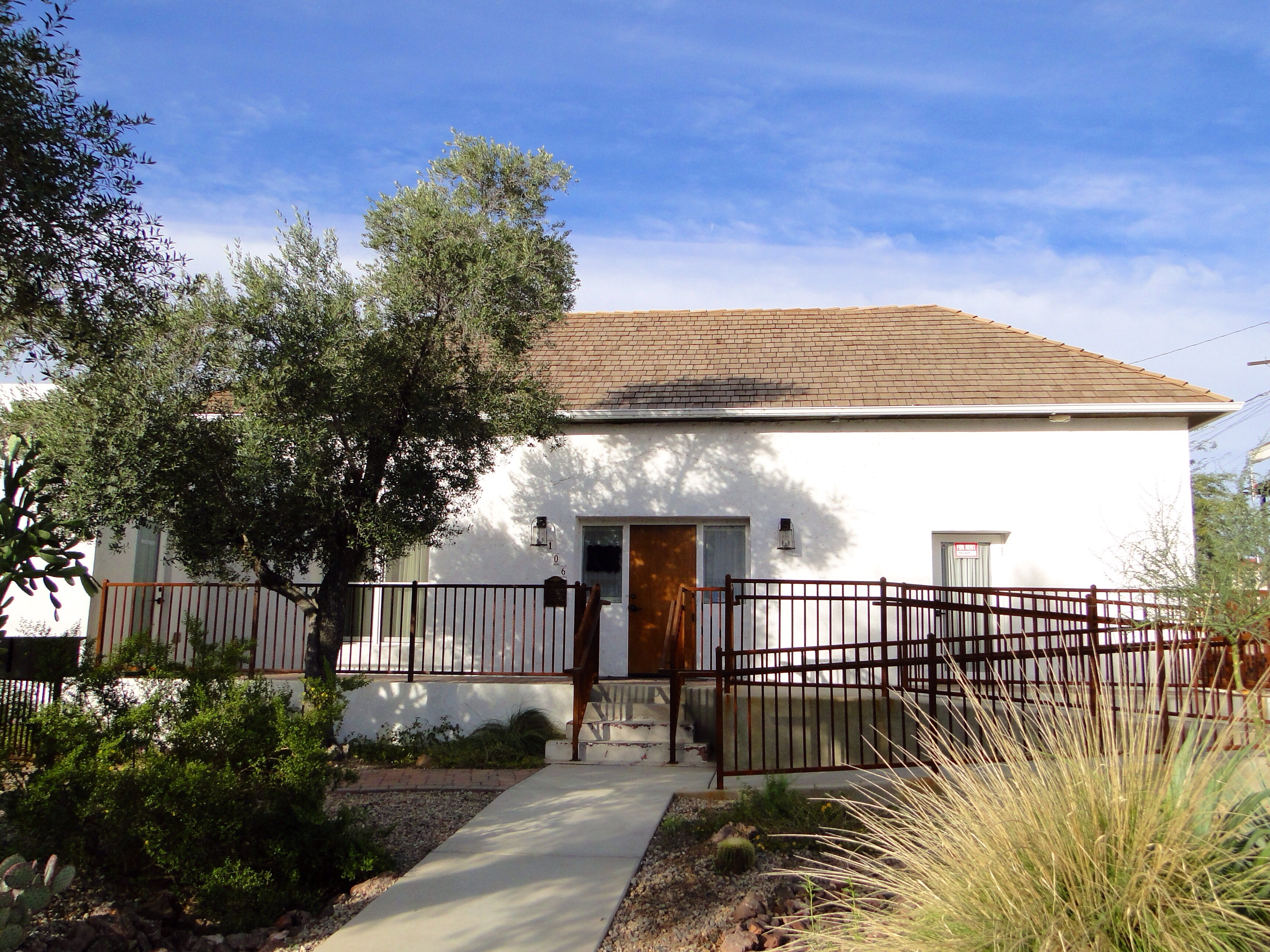
Neahr-Iaeger-Martinez House

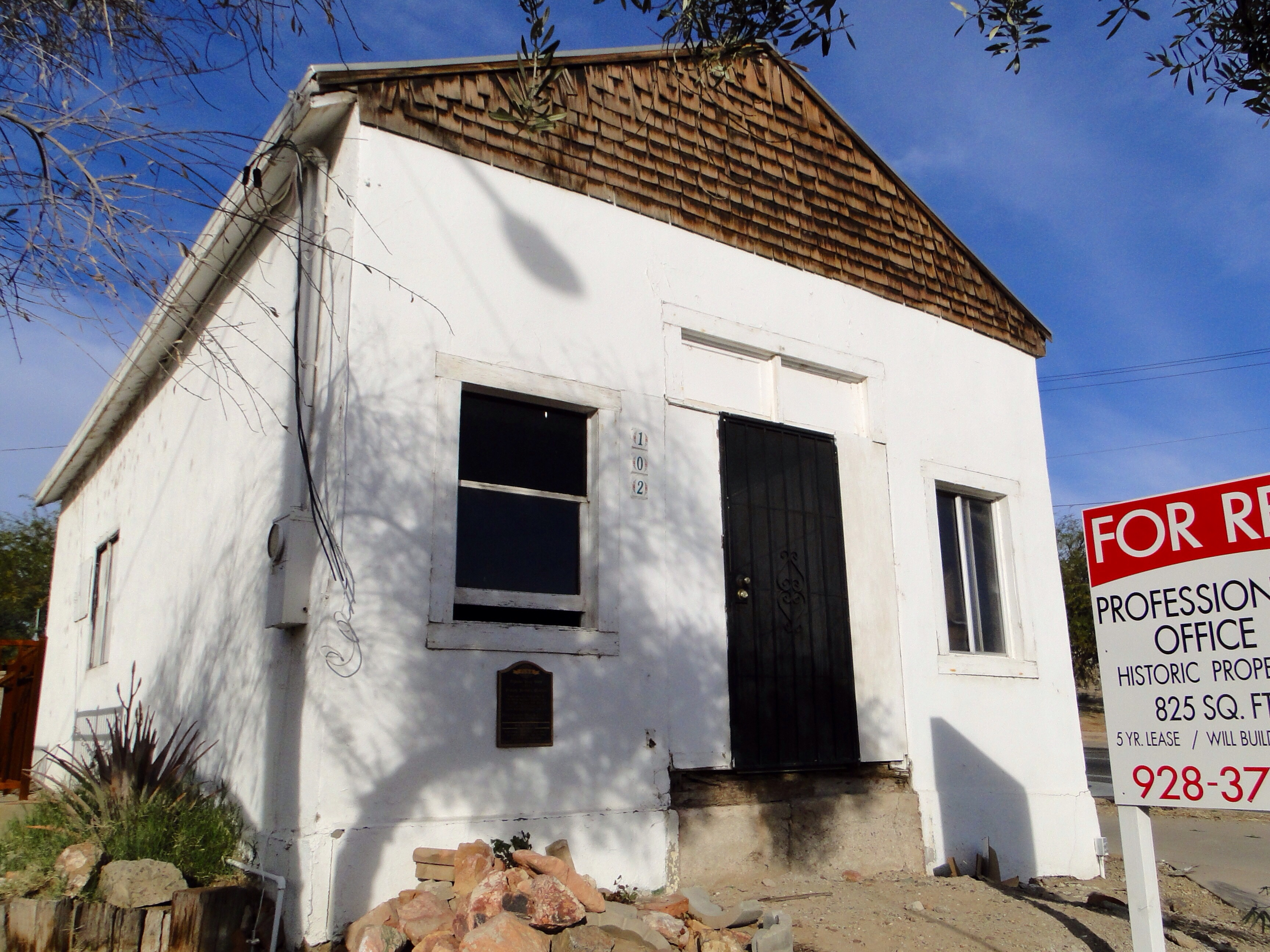
Popular Drug Store-Wedding Chapel

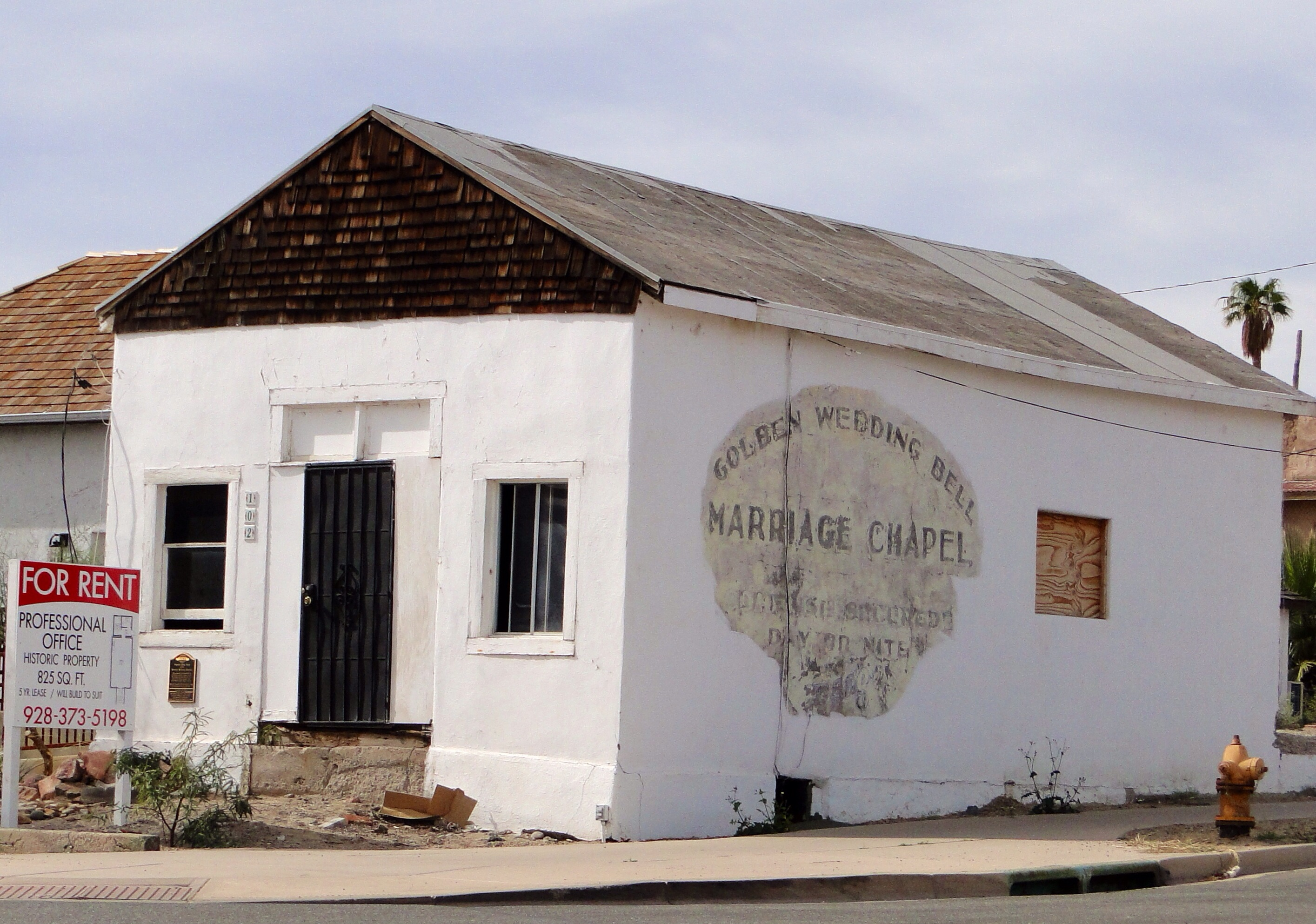
Golden Wedding Bell Marriage Chapel

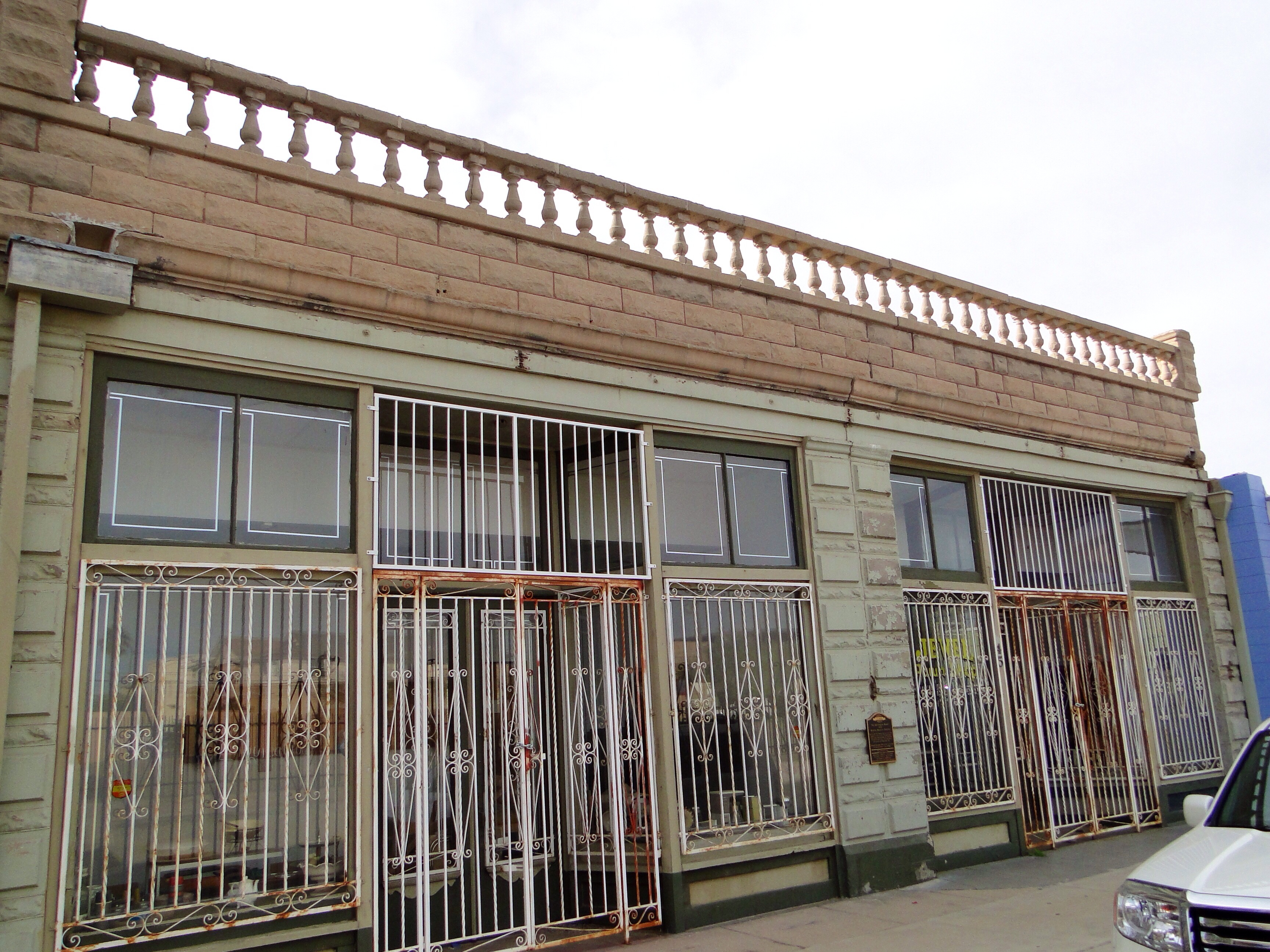
The Dorrington Block

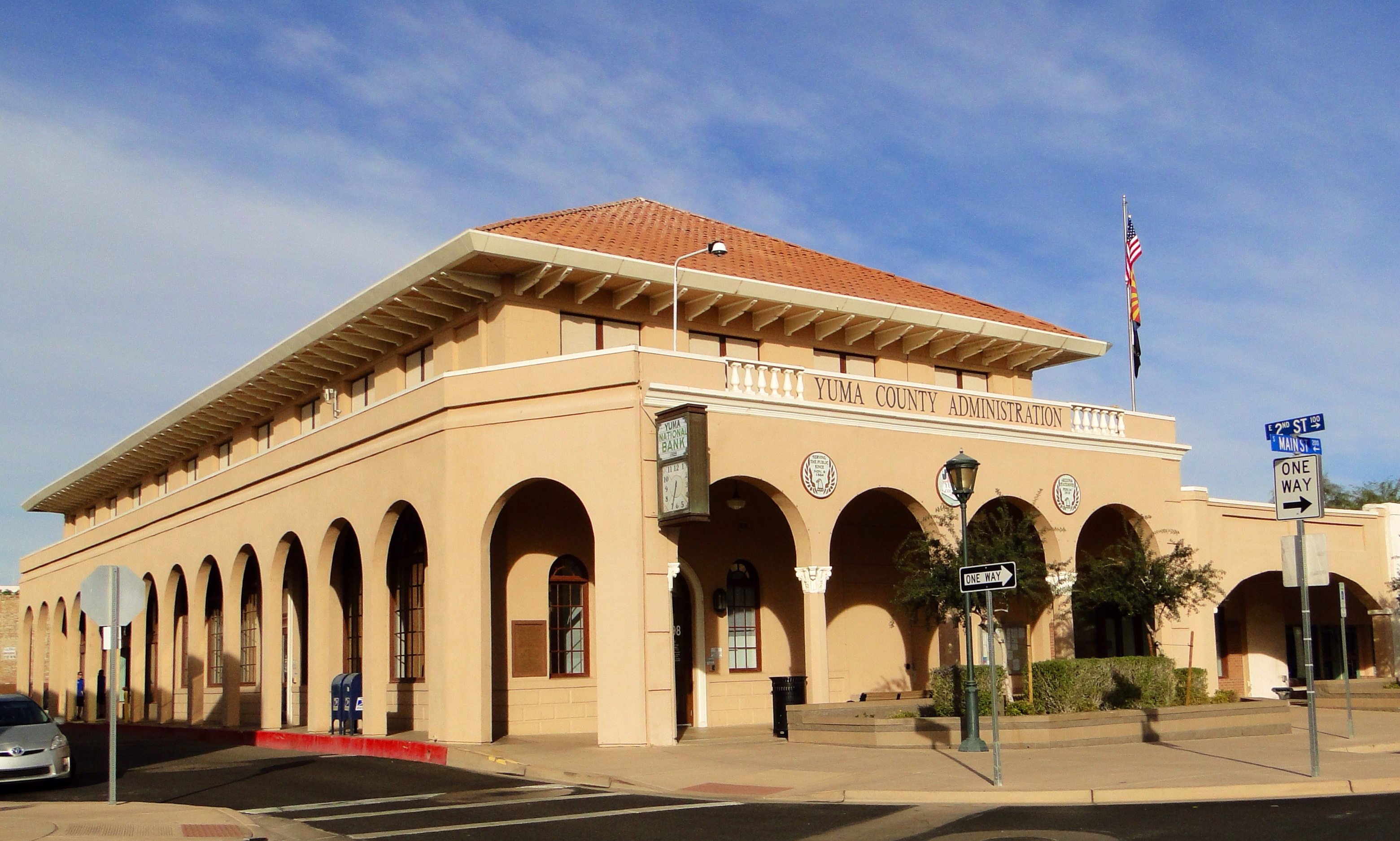
Yuma County Administration Building

== See also ==
- List of historic properties in Yuma, Arizona
