= Blaisdell Slow Sand Filter Washing Machine =

- U.S. National Register of Historic Places
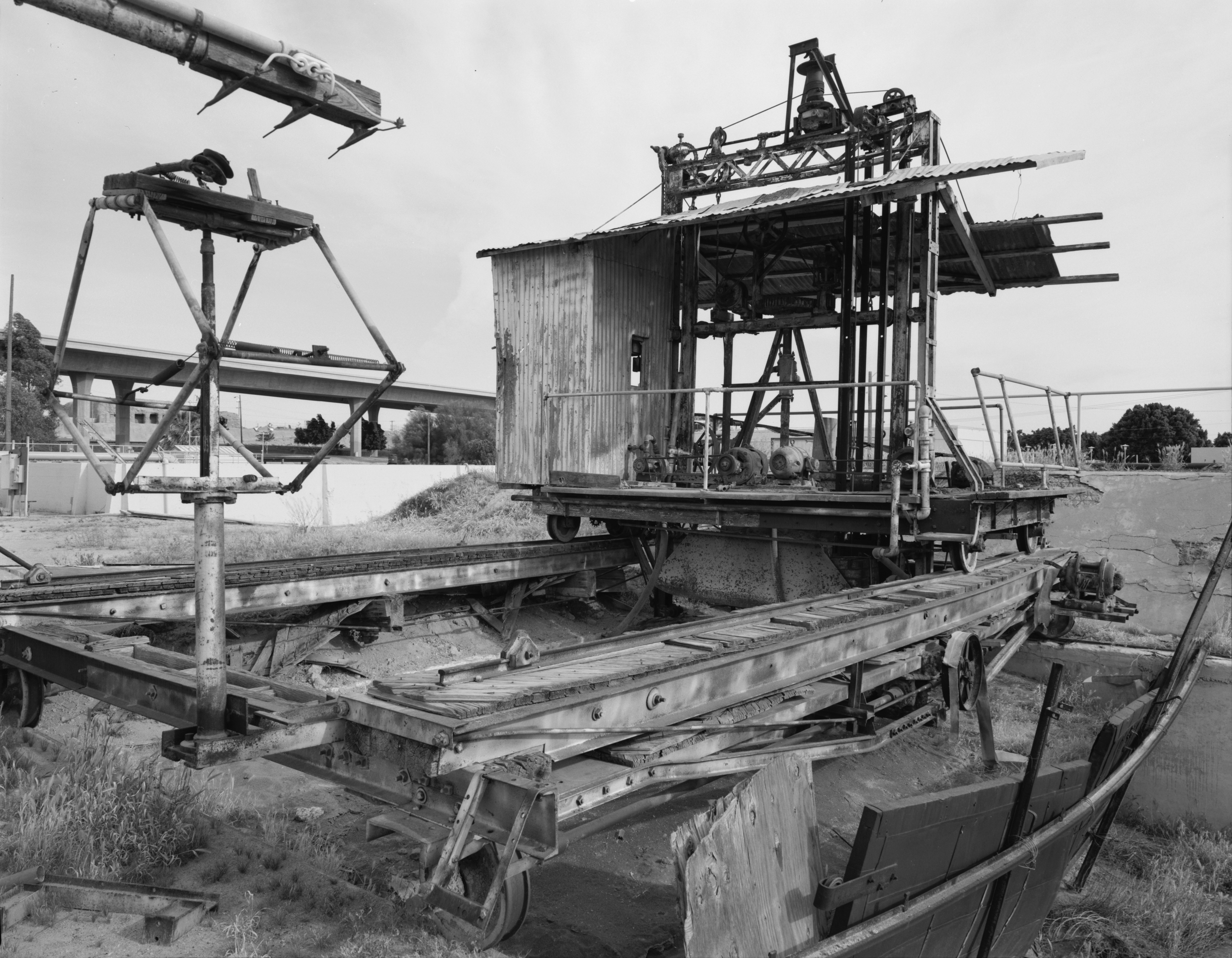

- Location within Arizona Location within the United States
- Location: N. Jones St., Yuma, Arizona
- Coordinates: 32°43′38″N 114°37′0″W
- Area: 0.5 acres (0.20 ha)
- Built: 1902
- Built by: Blaisdell, Hiram W.
- NRHP reference No.: 79000430
- Added to NRHP: January 18, 1979

The Blaisdell Slow Sand Filter Washing Machine at Yuma, Arizona is a device invented by Hiram W. Blaisdell to wash sand filters used in the treatment of drinking water. The machine was built in 1902 at Blaisdell's privately operated waterworks, which treated the muddy water of the Colorado River for local consumption. Blaisdell patented the device and marketed it throughout the United States. The Yuma filter is now on City of Yuma property, and has been preserved as the first of its kind.

== Description ==
The Blaisdell machine traveled along steel tracks laid on top of the walls of rectangular filter basins, bridging the walls with its structure. The washing chamber was lowered from the moving bridge frame into the basin. The chamber measures about 5 feet (1.5 m)wide, 2 feet (0.61 m) deep and 6 feet (1.8 m) long, and contains a 4-foot (1.2 m) diameter circular washing unit. The washing unit stirred the surface of the sand bed, dislodging sediment and flushing it away through two suction pumps at the top of the box, avoiding contamination of the surrounding water. The mechanism was controlled by an operator in a corrugated metal enclosure.

The Blaisdell machine was placed on the National Register of Historic Places on January 18, 1979.

== See also ==
- List of historic properties in Yuma, Arizona
