= San Carlos Hotel (Yuma, Arizona) =

- U.S. National Register of Historic Places
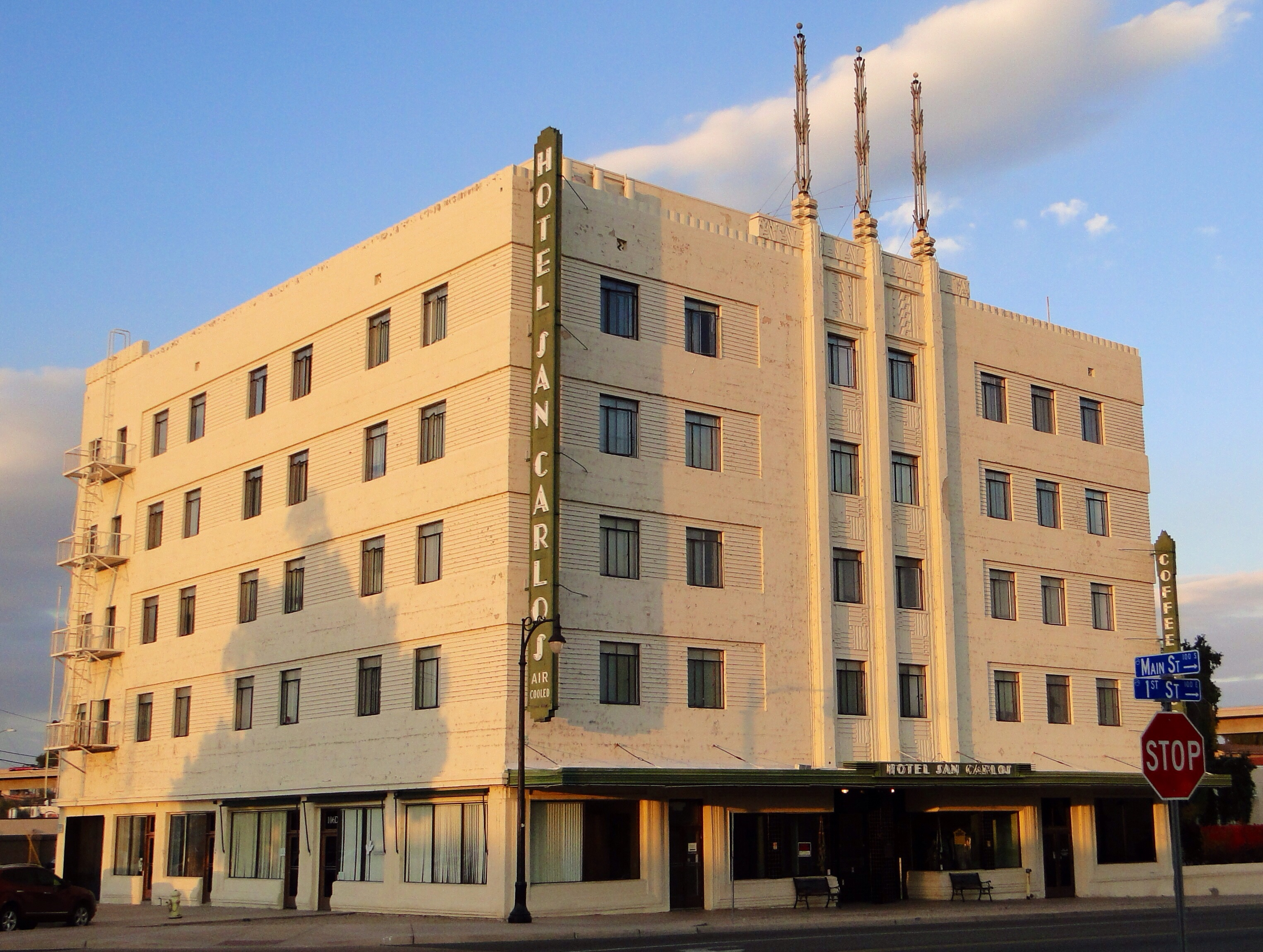
- The San Carlos Hotel in 2014

- Location within Arizona
- Location: 106 1st Street, Yuma, Arizona
- Coordinates: 32°43′33″N 114°37′19″W
- Area: less than one acre
- Built: 1930
- Architect: Dorr & Gibbs
- Architectural style: Art Deco
- MPS: Yuma MRA
- NRHP reference No.: 84000754
- Added to NRHP: April 12, 1984

The San Carlos Hotel is a historic hotel in Yuma, Arizona. Its construction cost $300,000, and it was completed in 1930. It was five stories high, with 107 bedrooms. The hotel closed in 1962. It was remodelled into 59 residential apartments in the 1980s. The current owner announced plans to sell the building in 2024.

The building was designed in the Art Deco architectural style by Dorr and Gibbs, a firm based in Los Angeles. It has been listed on the National Register of Historic Places since April 12, 1984.
