= Southern Pacific Depot =

The names Southern Pacific Depot, Southern Pacific Railroad Station, Southern Pacific Railroad Depot, and variations, apply to a number of train stations operated by the Southern Pacific Railroad:

== Arizona ==
- Southern Pacific Railroad Depot (Casa Grande, Arizona), listed on the NRHP in Pinal County
- Southern Pacific Railroad Depot (Safford, Arizona), listed on the NRHP in Graham County
- Southern Pacific Freight Depot (Yuma, Arizona), NRHP-listed
- Southern Pacific Railroad Depot (Yuma, Arizona), NRHP-listed
- Yuma (Amtrak station), at the site of a former Southern Pacific Railroad Depot

== California ==
- 16th Street station (Oakland)
- Benicia Southern Pacific Railroad Passenger Depot, NRHP-listed
- Berkeley Station
- Southern Pacific Depot (Chico, California), NRHP-listed
- Colfax Depot, Colfax, California
- Danville Southern Pacific Railroad Depot, NRHP-listed
- Davis (Amtrak station), listed on the NRHP as Southern Pacific Railroad Station
- Fillmore station (Southern Pacific Railroad)
- Folsom Depot, NRHP-listed
- Southern Pacific Depot (Fresno, California), NRHP-listed
- Glendale Southern Pacific Railroad Depot, now the Glendale Amtrak station, NRHP-listed
- Goleta Depot
- Lodi Transit Station
- Central Station, Los Angeles, main passenger terminal in Los Angeles, California
- Southern Pacific Depot (Millbrae, California), NRHP-listed
- Southern Pacific Railroad Depot (Modesto, California)
- Niles Depot, Fremont, California, now the Niles Depot Museum
- NoHo Arts District, Los Angeles (North Hollywood Depot)
- Palms-Southern Pacific Railroad Depot
- Sacramento Valley Station, Sacramento, listed on the NRHP as Sacramento Depot
- Saint Helena Southern Pacific Railroad Depot, NRHP-listed
- San Carlos station, listed on the NRHP as Southern Pacific Depot
- Saticoy Southern Pacific Railroad Depot, NRHP-listed
- Santa Susana Depot, Simi Valley
- Southern Pacific Depot (San Jose, California), now known as Diridon Station, NRHP-listed
- Southern Pacific Depot, Sanger, California
- Southern Pacific Train Depot (Santa Barbara, California), NRHP-listed
- Suisun–Fairfield station
- Southern Pacific Depot, Sunol, California
- Southern Pacific Railroad Depot, Whittier, NRHP-listed

== Louisiana ==
- Southern Pacific Railroad Depot (New Iberia, Louisiana), NRHP-listed

== Nevada ==
- Reno station, listed on the NRHP as Reno Southern Pacific Railroad Depot

== Oregon ==
- Canby Depot Museum, Canby, Oregon
- Eugene–Springfield station, listed on the NRHP as Southern Pacific Passenger Depot, in Eugene
- Lebanon Southern Pacific Railroad Depot, NRHP-listed
- Medford Southern Pacific Railroad Passenger Depot, NRHP-listed
- Salem station (Oregon), listed on the NRHP as Salem Southern Pacific Railroad Station
- Southern Pacific Railroad Passenger Station and Freight House, Springfield, NRHP-listed

== Texas ==
- Southern Pacific Railroad Freight Depot (Brenham, Texas), listed on the NRHP in Washington County, Texas
- Southern Pacific Railroad Depot (Nacogdoches, Texas), listed on the NRHP in Nacogdoches County, Texas
- Southern Pacific Depot Historic District, San Antonio, Texas, listed on the NRHP in Bexar County, Texas
- Southern Pacific Railroad Passenger Station (San Antonio, Texas), now San Antonio station, NRHP-listed

== See also ==
- Southern Pacific Railroad Locomotive No. 1673, Tucson, AZ, listed on the NRHP in Arizona
- Southern Pacific Railroad Passenger Coach Car-S.P. X7, Yuma, AZ, listed on the NRHP in Arizona
- Southern Pacific Steam Locomotive No. 745, Jefferson, LA, listed on the NRHP in Louisiana
- Southern Pacific Railroad: Ogden-Lucin Cut-Off Trestle, Ogden, UT, listed on the NRHP in Utah
- Southern Pacific Railroad Section Superintendent House, Folsom, CA, NRHP-listed in Sacramento County
- Southern Pacific Company Hospital Historic District, San Francisco, CA, listed on the NRHP in San Francisco, California
