= Southern Pacific Railroad Passenger Coach Car-S.P. X7 =

- Southern Pacific Railroad Passenger Coach Car--S.P. X7
- U.S. National Register of Historic Places
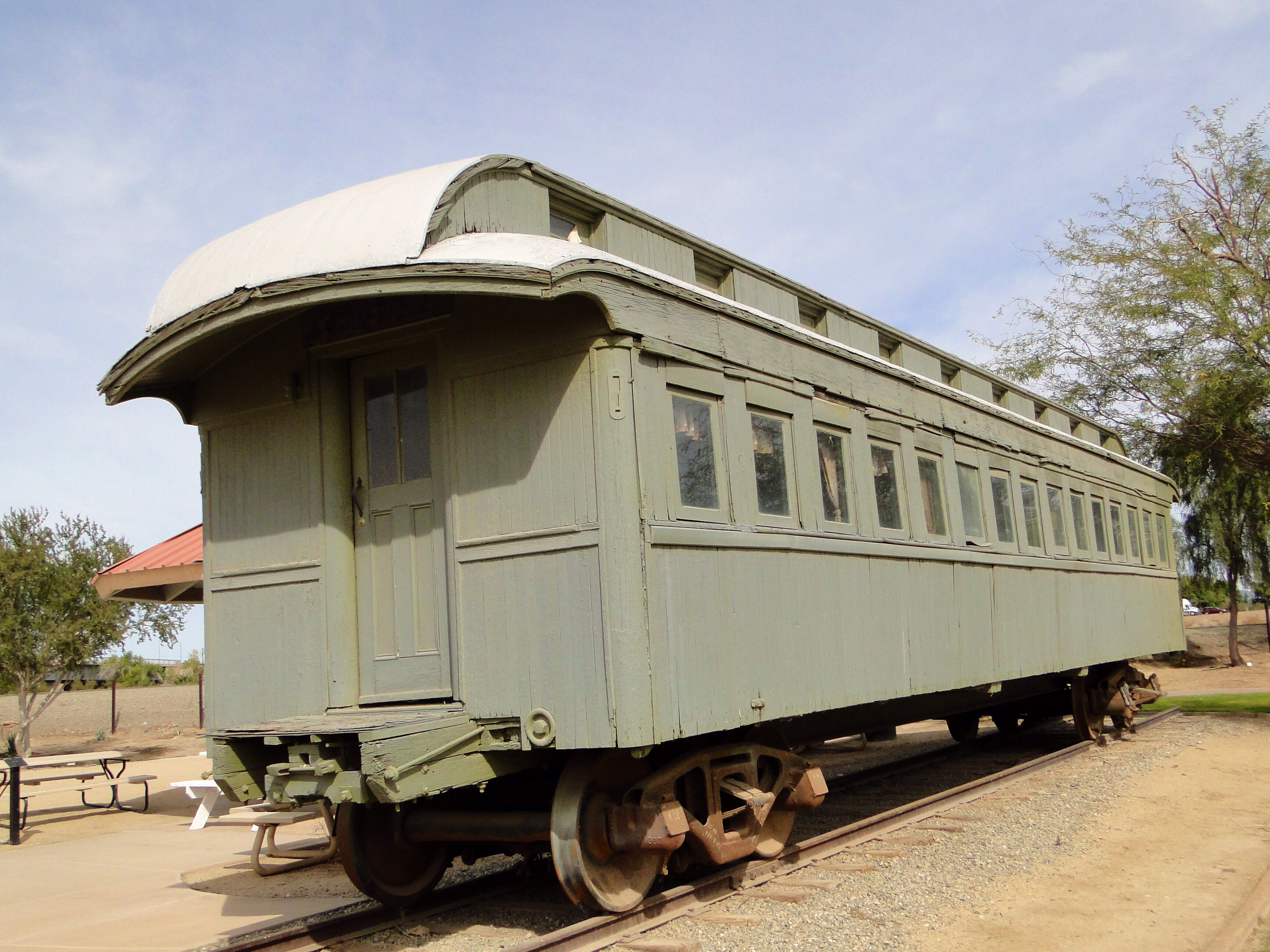
- At the Yuma Quartermaster Depot State Historic Park in 2014

- Location within Arizona Location within the United States
- Location: 201 N. 4th Ave., Yuma, Arizona
- Coordinates: 32°43′40″N 114°37′19″W
- Built: 1875
- Architect: Southern Pacific Railroad Shops
- Architectural style: SPRR passenger car
- NRHP reference No.: 00000101
- Added to NRHP: March 2, 2000

Southern Pacific Railroad Passenger Coach Car-S.P. X7 dates from c. 1875 and was used until 1938. It is a former passenger coach of the Southern Pacific Railroad's Southern Division. The railway vehicle was listed on the National Register of Historic Places in 2000, at which time it was located in Yuma, Arizona.

It is a representative example of the type of passenger coach car used when the Southern Pacific Railway entered Arizona, in September 1877, at Yuma Crossing.

A historic photo documents Geronimo beside a similar coach car in Texas in 1886.

== See also ==
- List of historic properties in Yuma, Arizona
- Southern Pacific Railroad Depot (Yuma, Arizona) – also NRHP listed.
- Southern Pacific Freight Depot (Yuma, Arizona) – also NRHP listed.
- National Register of Historic Places listings in Yuma County, Arizona
