= Amtrak California =

Caltrans passenger rail services

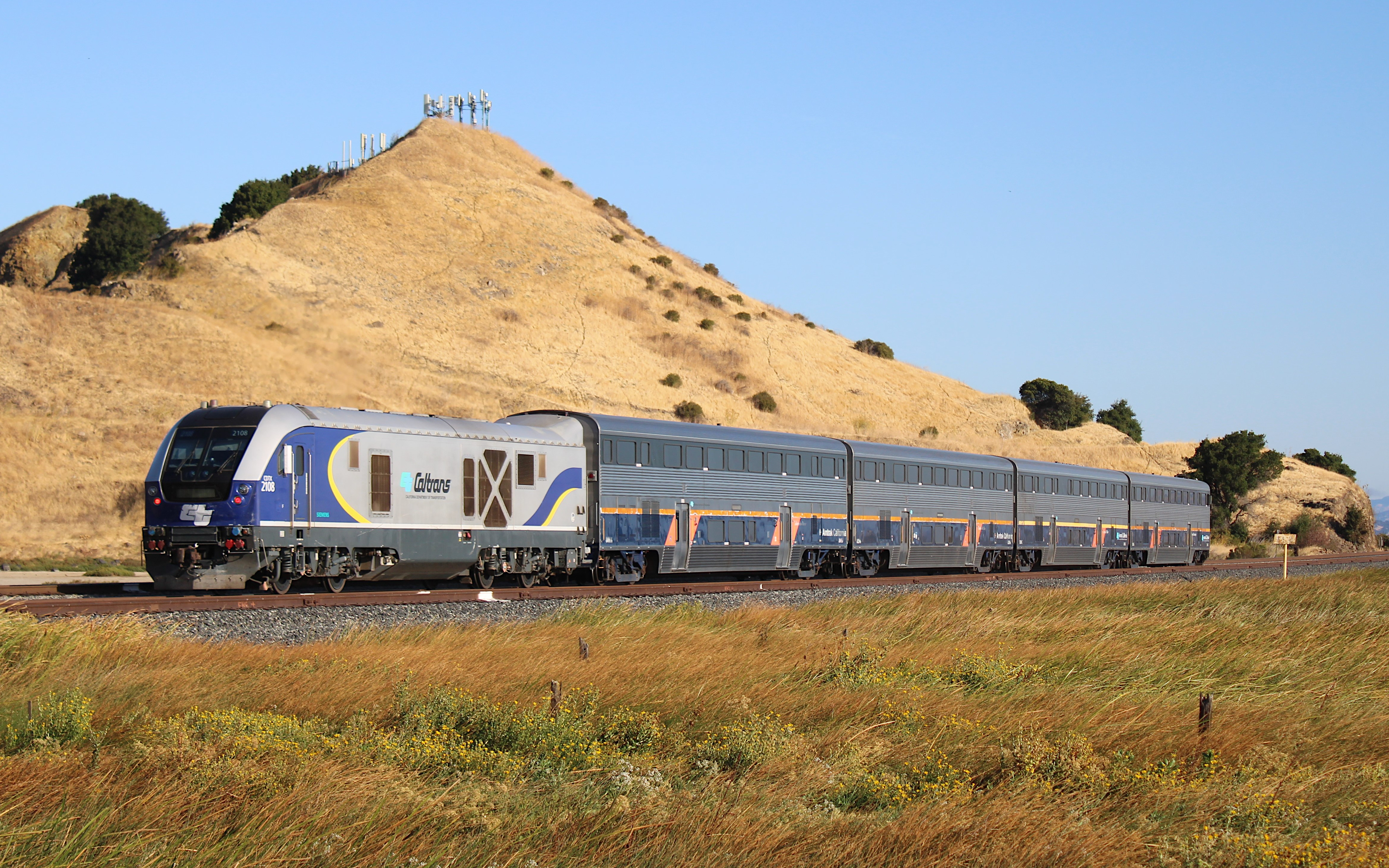
- A Capitol Corridor train in Benicia, California, 2024

Overview
- Owner: Caltrans Division of Rail
- Locale: California
- Transit type: Inter-city rail
- Number of lines: 3
- Headquarters: Sacramento, California
- Website: amtrakcalifornia.com

Operation
- Began operation: 1976
- Operator: Amtrak
- Reporting marks: CDTX

Technical
- Track gauge: 4 ft 8 1/2 in (1,435 mm) standard gauge
System map
Key

Amtrak California (reporting mark CDTX) is a brand name used by the California Department of Transportation (Caltrans) Division of Rail for three state-supported Amtrak regional rail routes in California – the Capitol Corridor, the Pacific Surfliner, and the Gold Runner – and their associated connecting network of Amtrak Thruway transportation services.

== History ==
Older logo of Amtrak California, still seen on some equipment

The National Railroad Passenger Corporation (Amtrak) assumed operation of almost all intercity passenger rail in the United States in 1971. Service in California, as in most of the United States, was basic and infrequent. In 1976 California began providing financial assistance to Amtrak. Around 1990, the Caltrans Division of Rail was formed to oversee state-financed rail operations and the brand Amtrak California started appearing on state-supported routes. Prior to that, rail management and oversight at Caltrans was part of the Division of Mass Transportation. The two divisions have since been merged into the Division of Rail and Mass Transportation.

In 1990, California passed Propositions 108 and 116, providing $3 billion for transportation projects ($7.4 billion after inflation), with a large portion going to rail service. As a result, new locomotives and passenger cars were purchased by the state, and existing inter-city routes expanded. A more distinct image for Amtrak California, such as painting locomotives and passenger cars in "California Color" of blue and yellow, was established with the arrival of new rolling stock.

In 1998, while still funded by the state, the management of the Capitol Corridor was transferred to the Capitol Corridor Joint Powers Authority (CCJPA), formed by local jurisdictions of the line serves. In 2015, the management of the Gold Runner (then called the San Joaquins) and the Pacific Surfliner were similarly transferred to the San Joaquin Joint Powers Authority (SJJPA) and the Los Angeles-San Diego-San Luis Obispo Rail Corridor Agency (LOSSAN Corridor JPA), respectively. As a result, the Amtrak California brand became less prominent in the websites and marketing materials. Caltrans still has a role in reviewing annual business plans submitted by the three JPA's.

As of 2022, Caltrans is studying Amtrak service to the Coachella Valley.

== Routes ==
=== Pacific Surfliner ===
The Pacific Surfliner serves Southern California on a route between San Luis Obispo and San Diego via Los Angeles; most trains only travel a portion of the route. It hugs the California coast for most of the route – coming as close as 100 ft (30 m) – providing views of the Pacific Ocean. With 2.7 million passengers in fiscal year 2013, it is Amtrak California's most heavily used service and the most used Amtrak service outside the Northeast Corridor, behind only the Northeast Regional and the Acela Express. It is also the oldest, dating to 1939 with the Santa Fe's San Diegan. The train shares codes with Metrolink's Ventura County Line.

=== Gold Runner ===
The Gold Runner, formerly San Joaquins, operates 14 trains (7 in each direction) each day between Bakersfield and Stockton. From Stockton, five trains from Bakersfield continue west to Oakland, while two trains proceed north to the state capital of Sacramento. Central Valley communities served include Fresno, Corcoran, Hanford, Lodi, Madera, Merced, Modesto, Turlock/Denair and Wasco. Delta/Bay communities of Antioch, Martinez, and Richmond are also served by the Gold Runner. Los Angeles is not served on this route due to the bottleneck of the Tehachapi Pass line, where the Union Pacific prohibits passenger train use due to freight traffic along the world's busiest single-track railway. Formerly called the San Joaquins, the Gold Runner has operated since 1974.

=== Capitol Corridor ===
The Capitol Corridor route, operating since 1991, runs north from San Jose through the East Bay to Oakland and Richmond, then east through the Delta communities of Martinez and Suisun City, and the Sacramento Valley cities of Davis and Sacramento. One Capitol Corridor train per day continues east of Sacramento during the afternoon commute to the small Sierra Nevada town of Auburn, returning in the morning. It is the fourth-busiest Amtrak route nationwide.

=== Thruway services ===
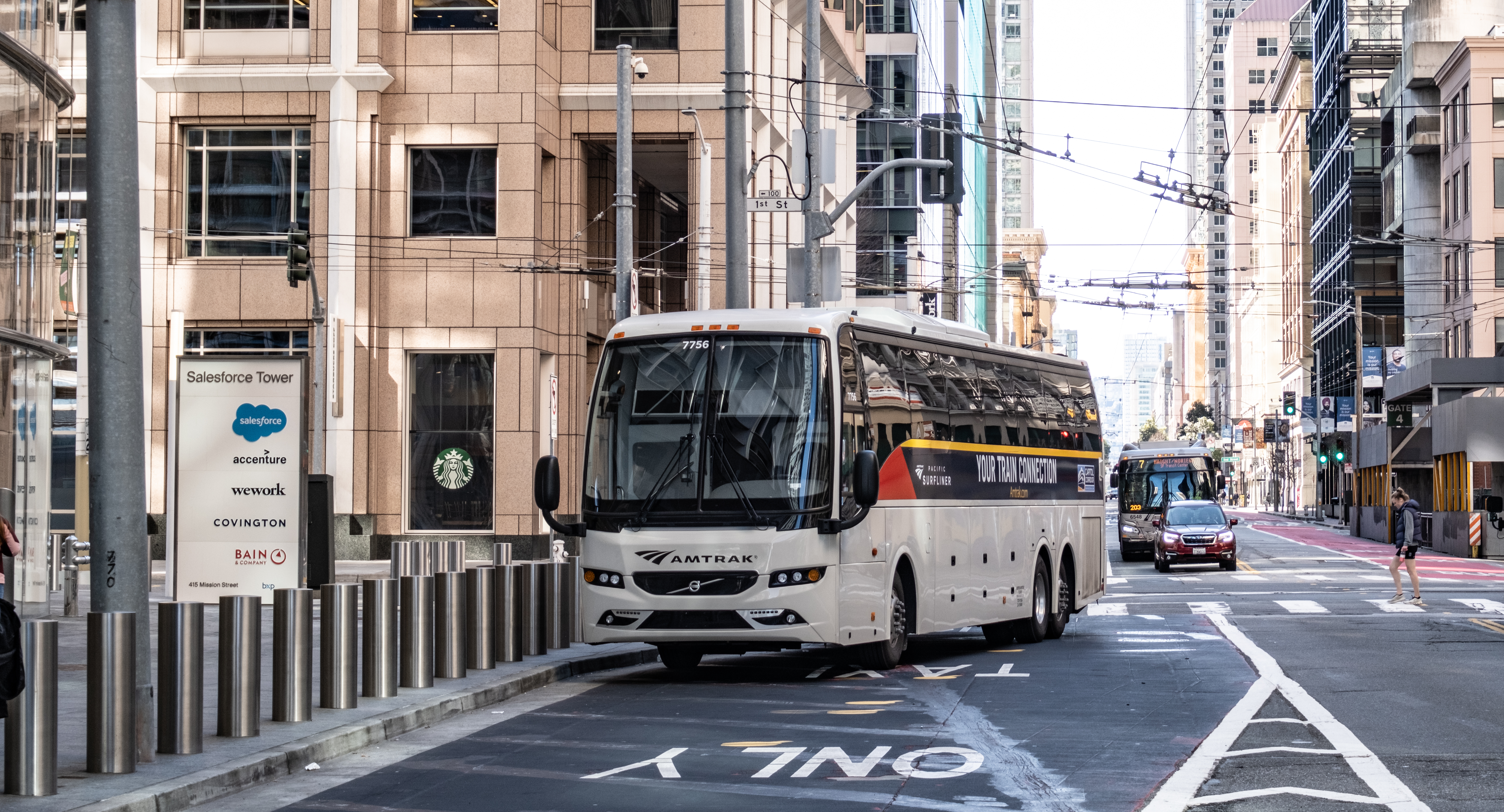
Amtrak California Thruway bus in San Francisco

Amtrak California also contracts for Amtrak Thruway bus services. As a result of a 2019 state law, most Thruway routes in California are available to passengers using only buses without connecting to an Amtrak train.

Route	Termini	
Route	Southern/Western	Northern/Eastern
1	San Diego	Bakersfield
1C	Santa Monica	Bakersfield
3	Stockton–San Joaquin Street	Redding
6	Santa Cruz	Stockton–San Joaquin Street
7	Martinez	Cal Poly Humboldt
10	UC Santa Barbara	Las Vegas, Nevada
15	Yosemite	Mammoth Lakes
15A	Merced	Yosemite
15B	Fresno	Yosemite
17	Santa Barbara	Oakland
18	Santa Maria	Visalia
19	San Bernardino	Bakersfield
20	Sacramento	Sparks, Nevada
20C	Sacramento	Stateline, Nevada
21	Santa Barbara	San Jose
39	Fullerton	Indio
99	San Francisco	Emeryville

=== Future ===
In order to provide rail service in the Coachella valley, the Riverside County Transportation Commission, along with Caltrans are planning the Coachella Valley - San Gorgonio Passenger Rail service under the Amtrak California brand to bypass opposition from Union Pacific

== Rolling stock ==
=== Locomotives ===
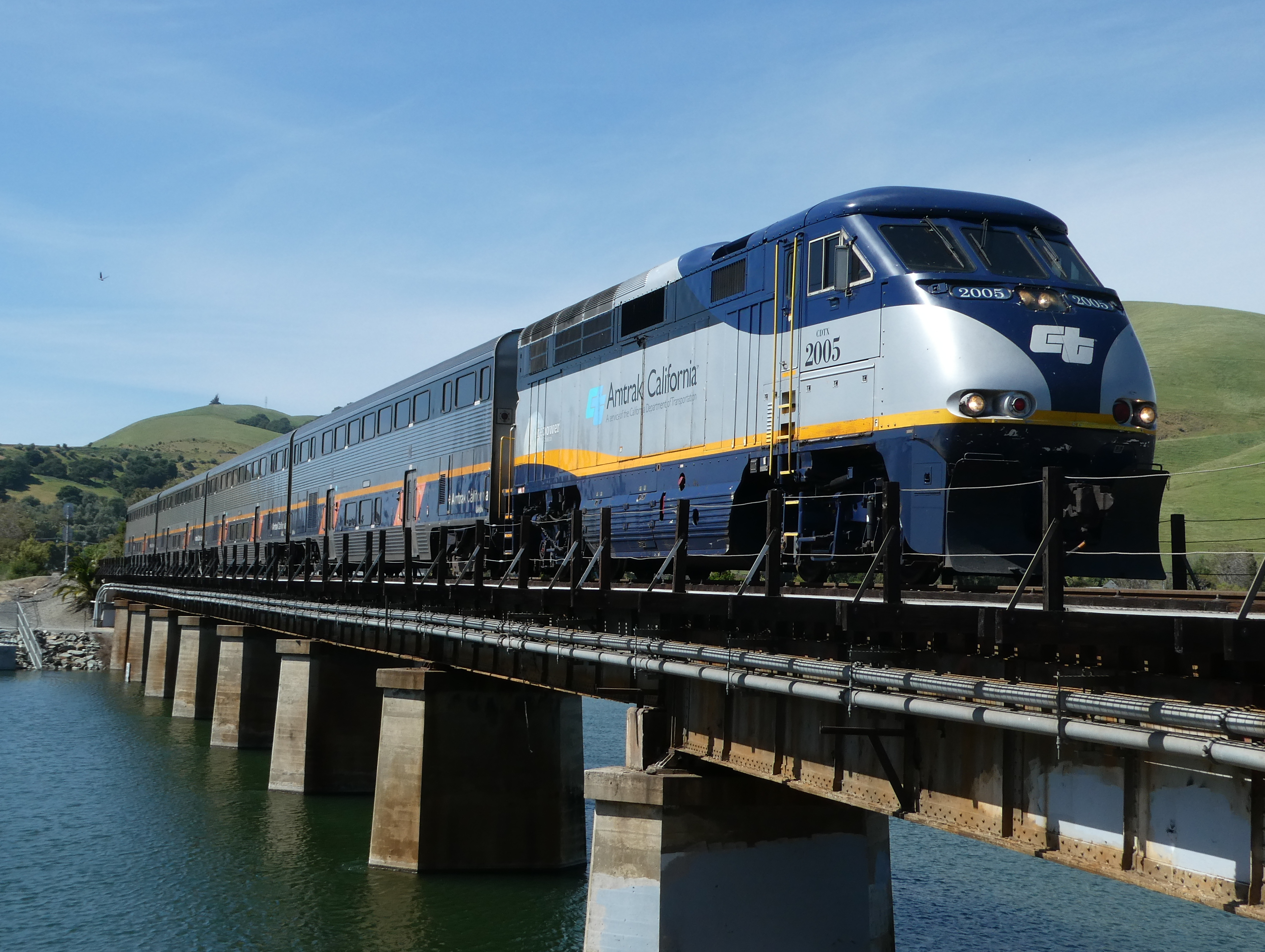
EMD F59PHI locomotive #2005 with Capitol Corridor service crossing Alameda Creek in April 2024

Amtrak California operates a fleet of EMD F59PHI and Siemens Charger locomotives. These locomotives are owned by Caltrans and carry the CDTX reporting marks. Locomotives from Amtrak's national fleet such as the P42DC are often used as substitutes when the Amtrak California dedicated fleet of locomotives undergoes maintenance.

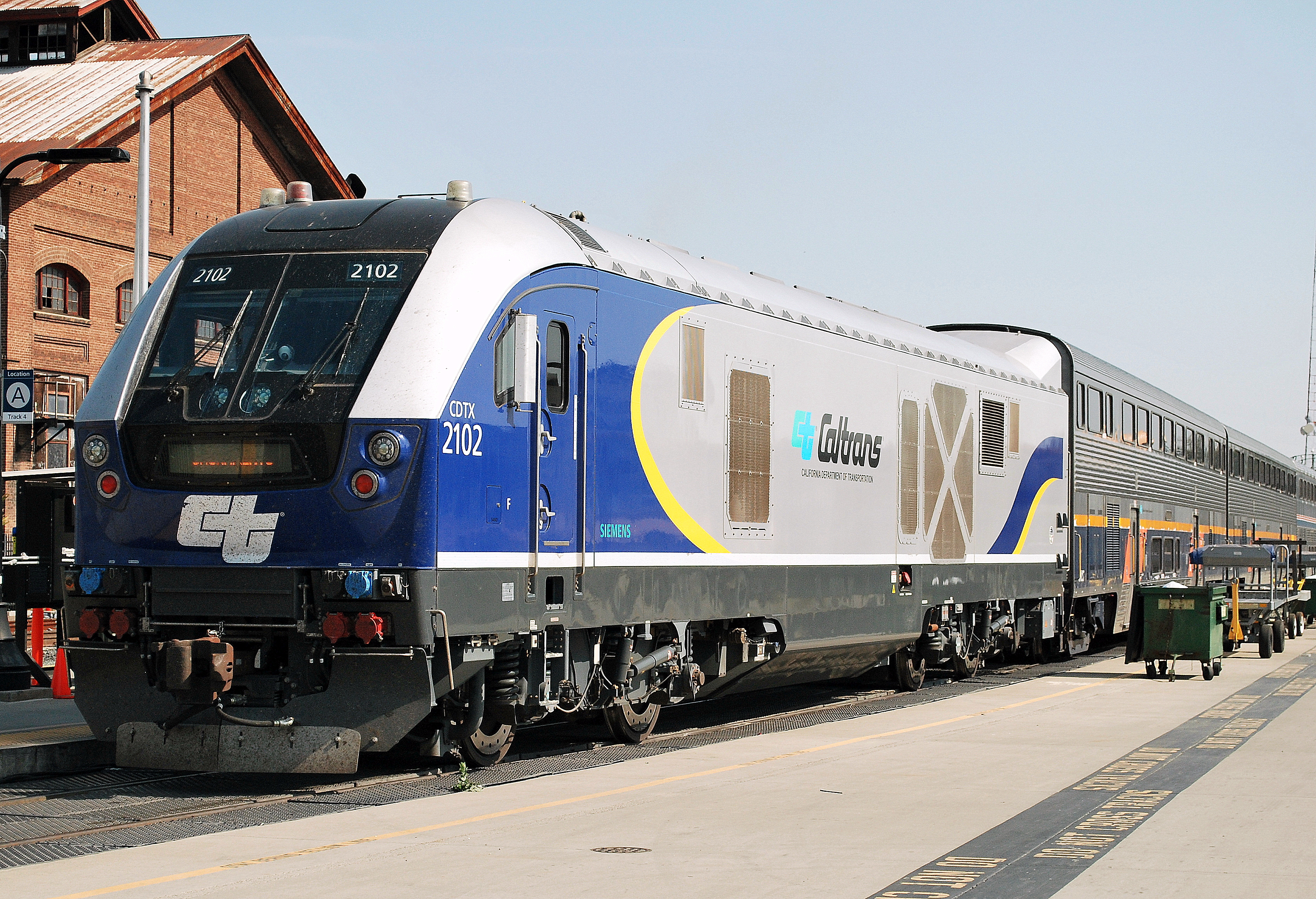
Siemens Charger SC-44 locomotive #2102 with Capitol Corridor service at Sacramento Valley Station

The 22 Siemens Charger locomotives are the newest members of the fleet, joined between 2017 and 2021. The Chargers were parts of a multi-state order funded by a combination of federal and state money. Illinois Department of Transportation, acting as the leading agency, awarded the order to Siemens on December 18, 2013. Caltrans ordered the first six with the initial order in 2013, then exercised the option to buy 14 more locomotives in 2015 to replace Amtrak-owned locomotives used on the Pacific Surfliner. Two additional locomotives were ordered in 2016.

=== Passenger cars ===
==== California Car / Surfliner bi-level trainsets ====
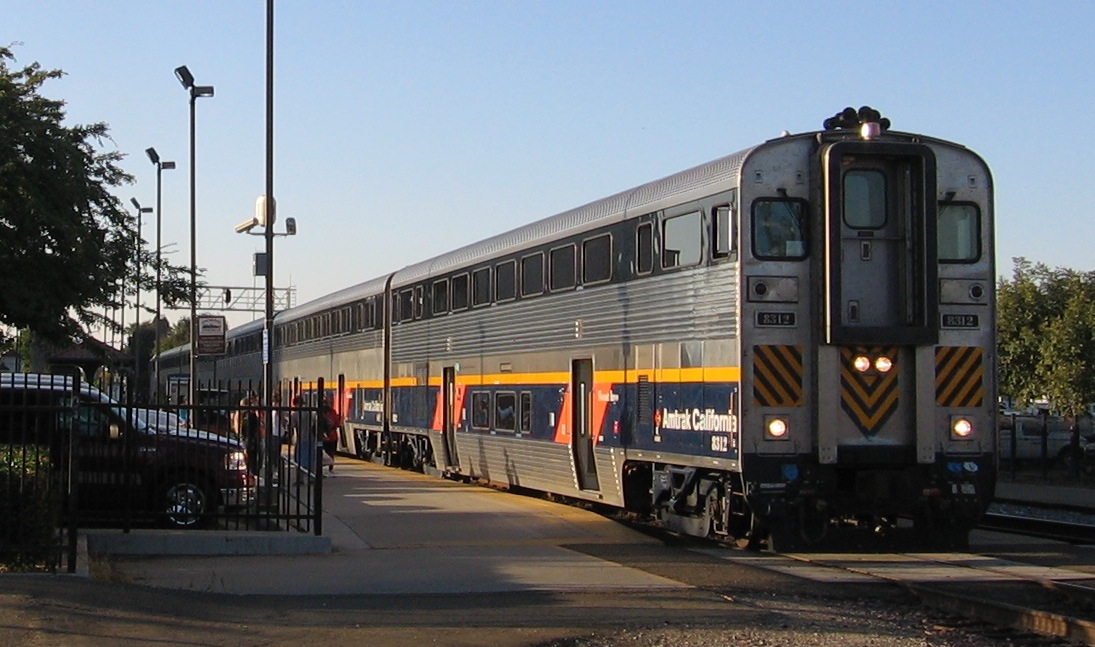
A bi-level "California Car" trainset on the San Joaquins at Fresno station

Amtrak California's routes typically use bi-level, high-capacity passenger cars, dubbed the Surfliner and California Car. All of the California Cars are owned by the California Department of Transportation (Caltrans). Amtrak owns most of the Surfliner cars with some owned by Caltrans.

The design of the cars is based on Amtrak's Superliner bi-level passenger cars, but several changes were made to the design to make the vehicle more suitable for corridor services with frequent stops. One significant difference is that the Surfliner and California Car have two sets of automatic doors on each side instead of only one manually operated door on the Superliners, which speeds up boarding and alighting considerably. Additionally, Surfliner and California Car coaches are equipped with higher-density seating and bicycle racks to permit transport of unboxed bicycles.

Consists on the Gold Runner, Capitol Corridor, and Pacific Surfliner routes usually include between four and six cars, with one locomotive and a cab control car on the rear end.

==== Superliner I rebuilds ====
In 2007, Amtrak California paid for the repair of seven wreck-damaged Superliner Coaches owned by Amtrak in exchange for a six-year lease, intended to quickly add capacity on busy Capitol Corridor and Gold Runner trains. Four of the cars were painted to match the "California car" livery, and three were painted to match the "Surfliner" livery.

==== Comet car single-level trainsets ====
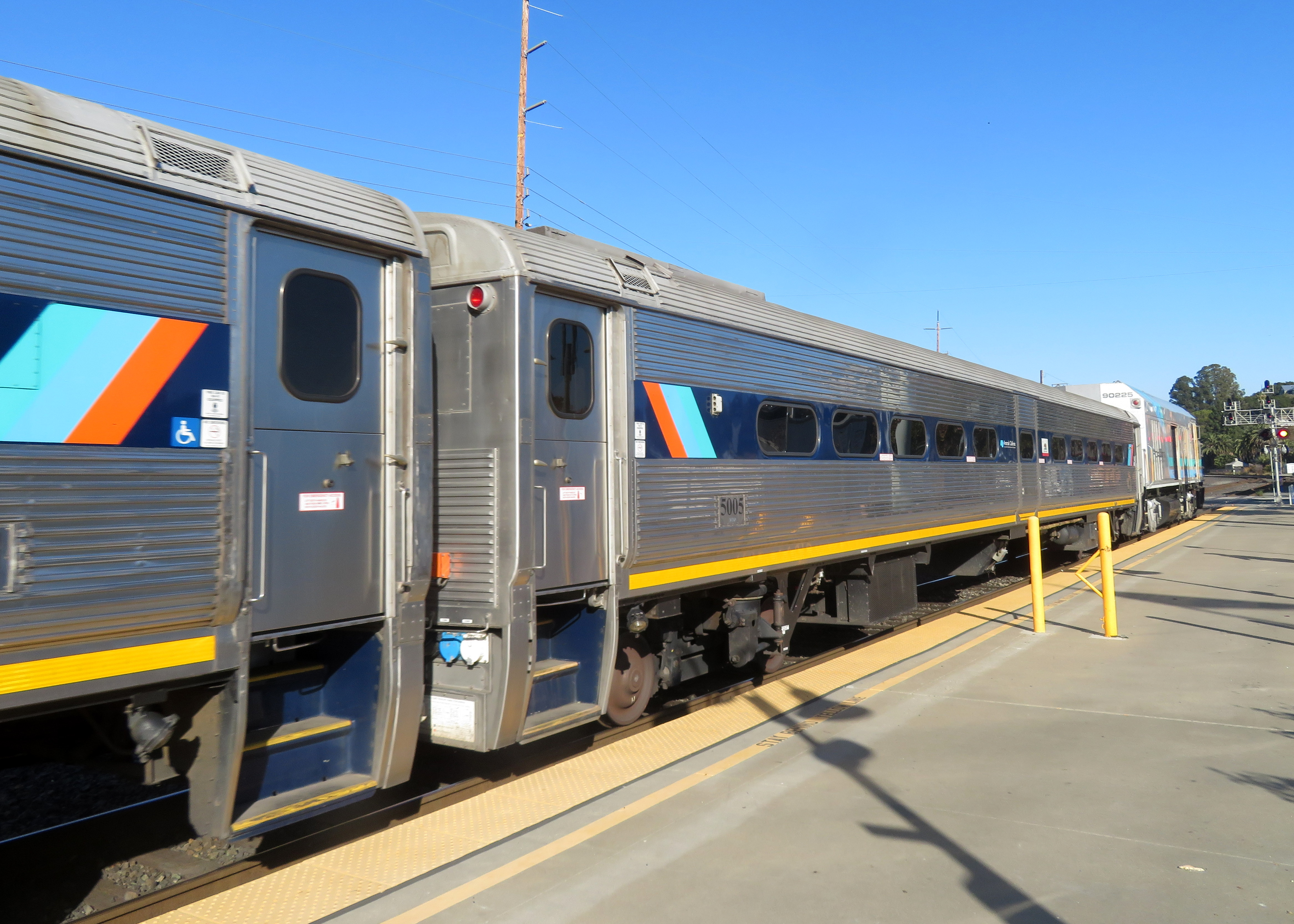
A single-level "Comet car" trainset at Martinez

Increasing ridership on the Gold Runner led Amtrak California to purchase 14 Comet IB rail cars from NJ Transit in 2008 for $75,000 per car. Caltrans paid approximately $20 million to have these former commuter cars refurbished and reconfigured to serve as intercity coaches at Amtrak's Beech Grove Shops.

Caltrans has also paid to lease three Non-Powered Control Units (old F40PH locomotives converted to serve as a cab/baggage car). The agency also previously paid to lease and refurbish three Horizon dinettes (used as café cars).

==== Siemens Venture single-level trainsets ====
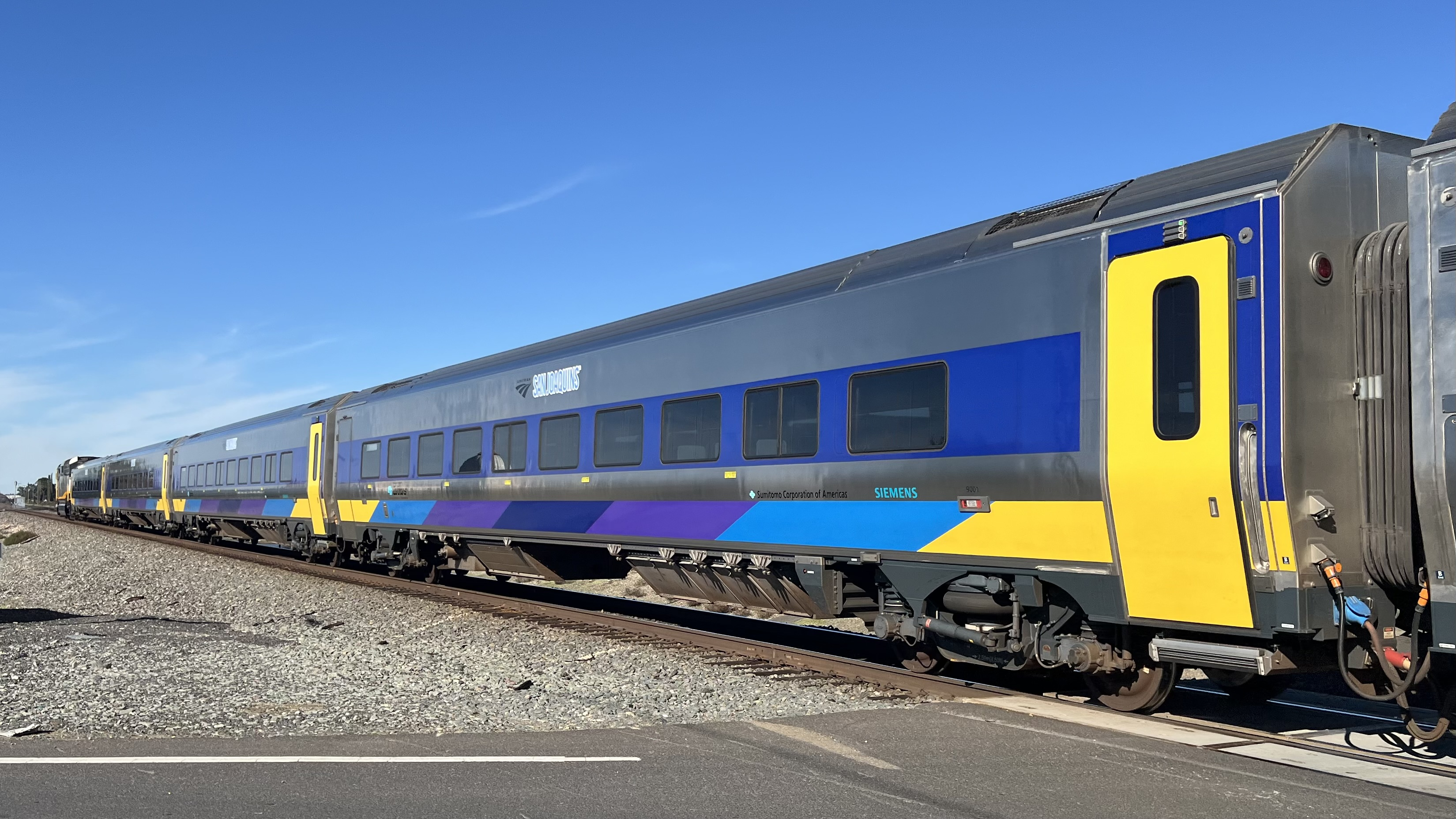
A single-level Siemens Venture trainset

A single-level Siemens Venture SC-44-derived cab car

In November 2017, the California Department of Transportation announced that it would be ordering seven Siemens Venture trainsets through its contractor Sumitomo Corporation. The states had initially contracted Sumitomo, which in turn subcontracted with Nippon Sharyo, to build the Next Generation Bi-Level Passenger Rail Car, but a prototype car failed a buff strength test in August 2015. After the test failure, Sumitomo canceled its deal with Nippon Sharyo, and turned to Siemens to be the new subcontractor. The cars are being built at the Siemens factory in Florin, California and will be hauled by California's existing fleet of diesel-electric locomotives.

California's trainsets will be used exclusively on the Gold Runner service and will consist of seven cars each: four coaches with economy seating, two coaches with economy seating and vending machines, and one cab car (control car) with economy seating. The order includes 49 cars for California, formed into seven semi-permanently-coupled trainsets. Since Siemens Venture trainsets were originally designed to be used with high platforms, the SJJPA was planning to modify all stations, adding two mini-high platforms (short lengths of high platform, each long enough for one door, with an accessible ramp to the longer low platform). As delivered, the new Venture cars include trap door low level boarding with retractable steps to platform height, along with some cars in each trainset being equipped with wheelchair lifts. This enables them to be used with either low or high level platforms.

=== Livery ===
Amtrak California utilizes a livery and logo that is different from the standard Amtrak colors. All state-contracted Amtrak Thruway and state-owned locomotives and passenger cars, with the exception of equipment used on the Pacific Surfliner route, are painted in the "California Colors" of blue and yellow. Each permanently assigned passenger car is named after a geographical feature of California.

The Capitol Corridor and Gold Runner trains are the two routes most identified with the Amtrak California image, since they extensively use "California Colored" equipment. The other state-supported rail route, the Pacific Surfliner, uses a unique blue and silver paint scheme that is different from the other Amtrak California-branded trains.

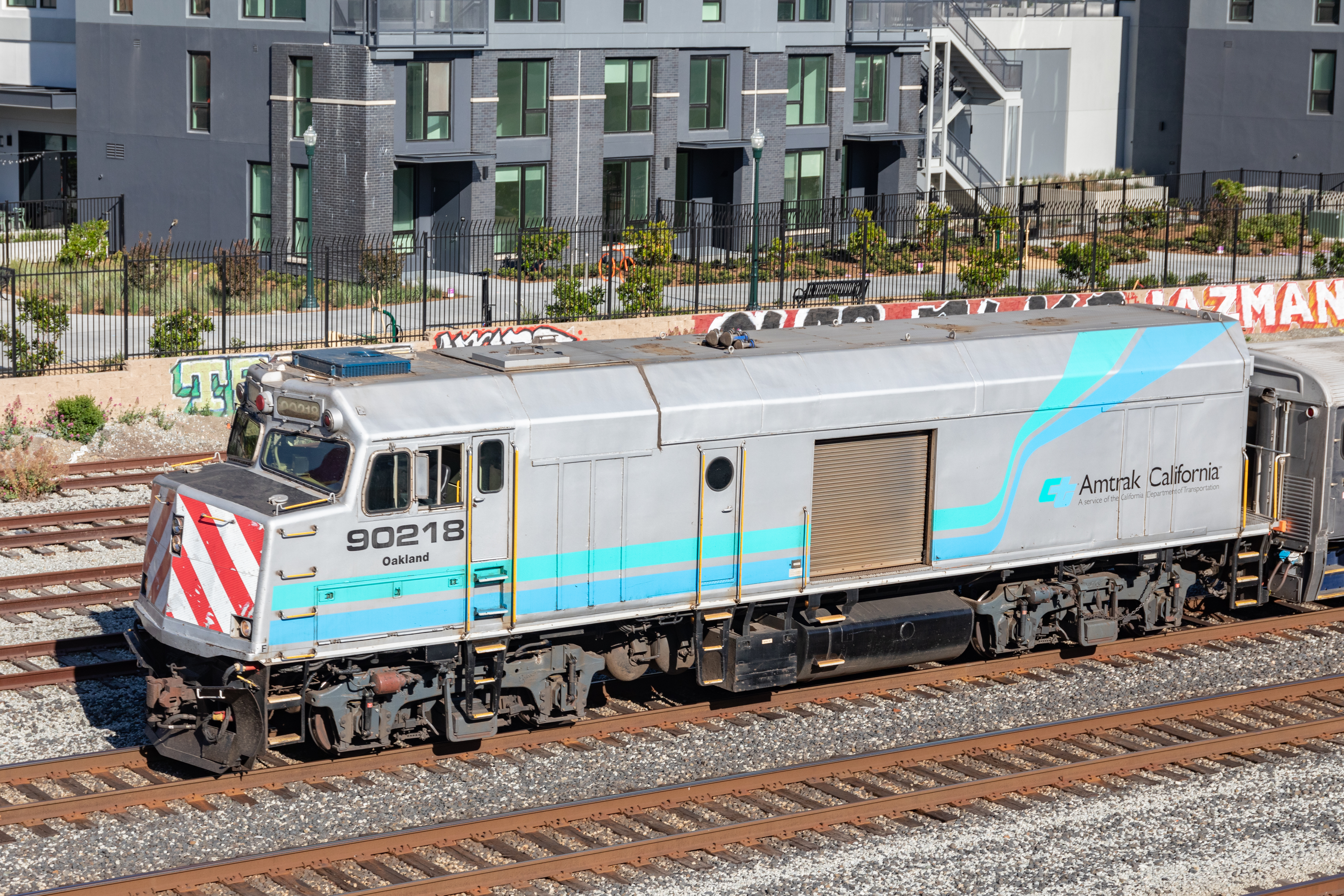
Ex-F40PH NPCU livery with turquoise and aqua-blue stripes differs from other rolling stock with blue and yellow stripes

The NPCUs that operate on the Capitol Corridor and Gold Runner are painted differently from the locomotives, as they are painted in the old "Caltrain" locomotive livery, with an Amtrak California and Caltrans logo, turquoise and aqua-blue stripes on the sides and red/white diagonal stripes on the front. The single level cars, both the Comet cars and the Horizon dinettes, have three stripes closest to the boarding doors, orange, blue and green, which resemble the NJ Transit livery that was previously used on the Comet cars.

=== Equipment lease from Caltrain ===
In September 2025, Caltrain approved a 5-year lease with the option of purchase, of 3 MPI F40PH-2C locomotives, 13 Bombardier BiLevel trailer cars, and 3 Bombardier BiLevel cab cars to Caltrans in order to relieve equipment shortages on Amtrak California's Capitol Corridor and Gold Runner routes due to maintenances, repairs, and overhauls.

== See also ==
- List of Amtrak stations in California
- List of San Francisco Bay Area trains
- Other former state-supported rail services:
  - CalTrain – a short-lived service in Southern California, later re-established under local control
  - "Orange County Commuter" – commuter service conveyed to local control in 1994
  - Spirit of California – sleeper-service which ran between Los Angeles and Sacramento via Oakland from 1981 to 1983
