= Colorado River State Historic Park =

Part of the Yuma Crossing National Heritage Area

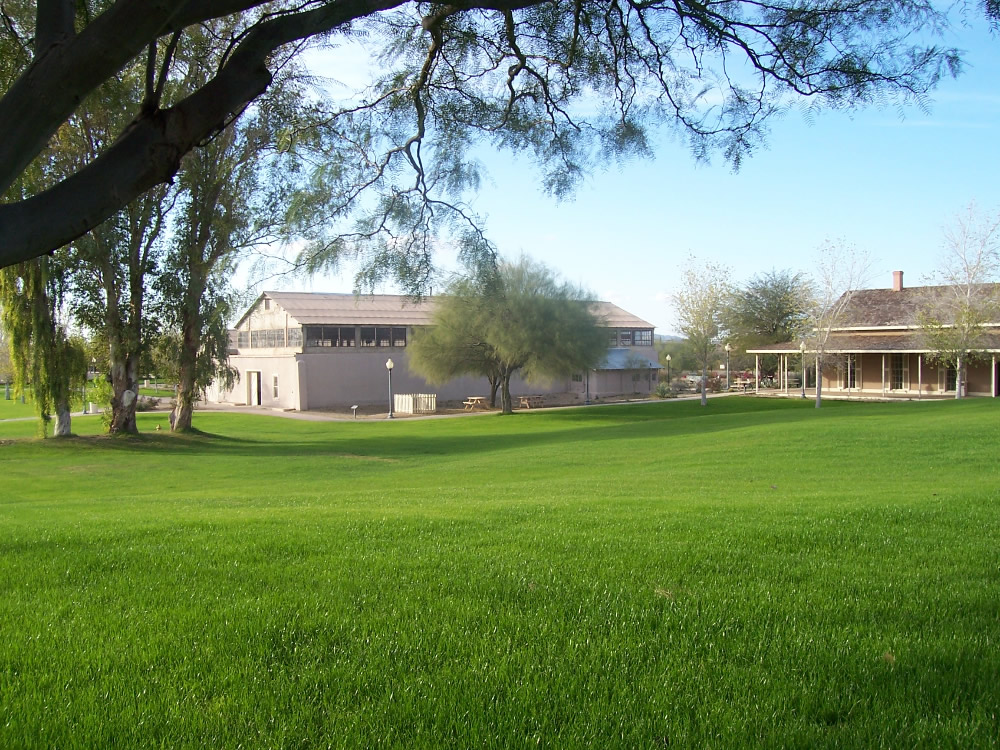
- The warehouse at Yuma Quartermasters Depot

- Location within Arizona
- Interactive map of Colorado River State Historic Park
- Location: Yuma County, Arizona, United States
- Coordinates: 32°43′38″N 114°37′28″W
- Area: 10 acres (4.0 ha)
- Elevation: 120 ft (37 m)
- Established: 1997
- Administrator: Arizona State Parks & Trails
- Visitors: 7,332 (in 2024)
- Website: Colorado River State Historic Park

Colorado River State Historic Park, formerly Yuma Crossing State Historic Park and Yuma Quartermaster Depot State Historic Park, and now one of the Yuma Crossing and Associated Sites on the National Register of Historic Places in the Yuma Crossing National Heritage Area. It is an Arizona state park in the city of Yuma, Arizona, US.

The Yuma Quartermaster Depot was an important quartermaster depot during the 1870s. Goods were shipped up the Colorado River from the Gulf of California and stored at Yuma for distribution to the desert frontier forts in the Southwestern United States territories.

== History ==
Yuma Quartermaster Depot State Historic Park is on the grounds of the former Yuma Quartermaster Depot. The depot was established by the U.S. Army in 1864 to store and distribute supplies to frontier army posts in what is now Texas, New Mexico, Arizona, Nevada and Utah. One purpose of the depot was to ensure that a six-month supply of much needed goods such as ammunition, food and clothing was on hand at all times. The goods and supplies were brought to Yuma from California aboard ships that traveled around the Baja California peninsula and up the Gulf of California to Port Isabel, Sonora at the mouth of the Colorado River. Supplies were shipped up the Colorado on river boats to Yuma and stored at the Yuma Quartermaster Depot.

The supplies gathered at the quartermaster depot were shipped throughout the southwest via river boats and overland on mule team freight wagons. Up to 900 mules were kept in stables at Yuma Quartermaster Depot. The arrival of the Southern Pacific Railroad in Yuma in 1877 signaled the end of the depot. When the railroad reached Tucson in 1880, the quartermaster depot was closed. The quartermasters moved to Fort Lowell in Tucson.

The Signal Corps, having arrived at Fort Yuma and the quartermaster depot in 1875, remained there until 1891. Following the departure of the Signal Corps, the property was transferred to the control of the U.S. Weather Service which worked out of the depot site until 1949.

The Yuma Quartermaster Depot fell into a state of disrepair in the years following 1949. Some of the facilities were used by the U.S. Customs and Border Protection and other governmental agencies.

=== Historical park ===
Five buildings left over from the quartermaster depot days remain at the park. The site was identified as a possible historic park in the early 1960s. The office of the depot quartermaster was acquired by the state in 1969. More property was added to what would become the park in 1980. The park land was purchased from United States Department of the Interior by the city of Yuma and donated to the state park system in 1986. Groundbreaking for the park was held in 1986. The park opened in 1990 as a unit of Yuma Territorial Prison State Historic Park and was established as a state historic park in 1997, under the control of the non-profit Yuma Crossing Foundation.

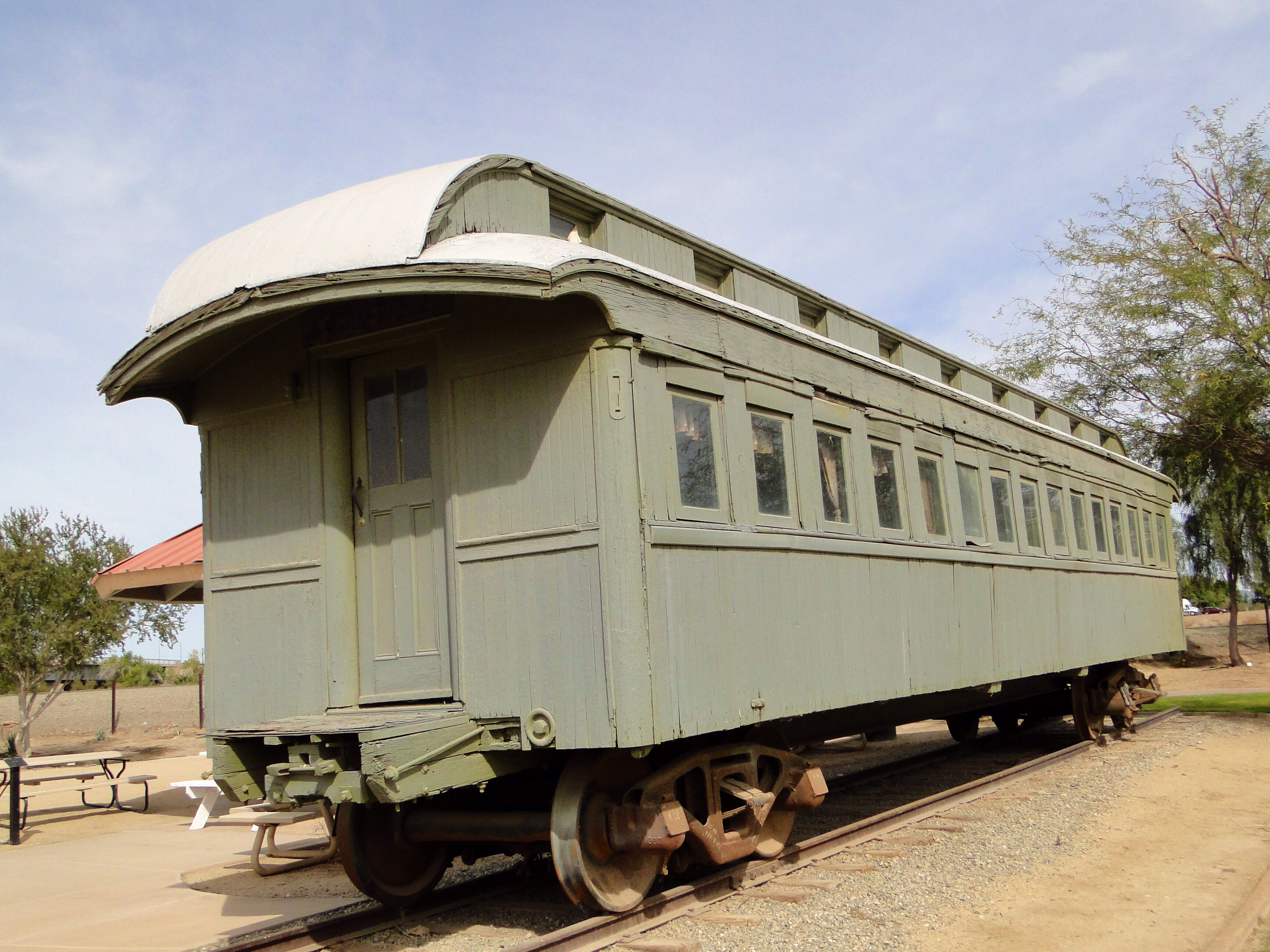
Southern Pacific Railroad Passenger Coach Car-S.P. X7, at the park in 2014

The Yuma Crossing Foundation established an agreement with the state parks board to manage, develop and operate the site as a living history museum. After seven years of construction and rebuilding the park was opened to the public in 1997 as Yuma Crossing State Historic Park. The park is part of the Yuma Crossing National Heritage Area. The name of the park was changed in 2007 to reflect the original use of the area and its historic interpretive focus.

As of 2014, the park includes the Southern Pacific Railroad Passenger Coach Car-S.P. X7, which is separately listed on the National Register of Historic Places.

Yuma Crossing National Heritage Area renamed the park to Colorado River State Historic Park in 2017 to reflect expanded coverage of the Colorado River.

== Facilities ==
=== Historic exhibits ===
Four of the five original buildings house historic exhibits. The storehouse details the history of the Colorado River and the steamboat era on it, and of the mule wagon trains. The office of the depot quartermaster houses two exhibits. One is an historic recreation of the depot as it appeared in its heyday. Another shows how the weather and telegraph stations appeared. The commanding officers quarters is a house museum which mimics how it would have looked in the 1870s, when army officers and their families lived in the space. A biologic exhibit of fish species in the Colorado River is found in the corral house. Outdoor exhibits at the park include ramadas, a steam boiler, a stone built reservoir and an encampment of wagons.

The park is open to picnicking. A day use facility under a shade ramada is available for group use with reservations. Picnic tables are available throughout the park as is one pavilion.

== See also ==
- List of historic properties in Yuma, Arizona
