= Coachella Valley Rail =

Proposed passenger rail corridor in Riverside County, California, United States

Overview
- Service type: Inter-city rail
- Status: in planning
- Locale: Los Angeles County; Riverside County
- Current operator: Amtrak (planned)

Route
- Termini: Los Angeles; Indio or Coachella
- Stops: 3–7
- Distance travelled: 145 mi (233 km)
- Service frequency: 2 round trips daily

Technical
- Track gauge: 4 ft 8 1/2 in (1,435 mm) standard gauge
- Track owners: BNSF; UP; SCAX

The Coachella Valley Rail (CV Rail) project is an effort by the Riverside County Transportation Commission (RCTC) to start regular passenger rail services between Los Angeles and Indio, California. Service is envisioned to start at Los Angeles Union Station and run over the route of the Southwest Chief, switching to the valley's Union Pacific Railroad line at Colton to run over San Gorgonio Pass and terminating at Indio or Coachella. The proposed schedule would include one morning and one afternoon trip in each direction for two daily round trips. As of 2022, the current rail line in the Coachella Valley is owned by the Union Pacific Railroad, as part of its Sunset Route between Los Angeles and Yuma, Arizona. The Sunset Limited Amtrak service stops at the Palm Springs station three times a week in each direction.

== History ==
UP Yuma Subdivision near Cabazon. Under the plan, the line would be expanded to three tracks to allow for additional capacity for passenger service through the corridor.

Passenger service connecting Riverside County with Los Angeles has existed since the opening of the Sunset Route. The flagship train, the Sunset Limited, has made stops in the Coachella Valley since the train's inception under Southern Pacific. When Amtrak took over control of the service in 1971 it had been reduced in frequency to three round trips per week. Amtrak maintained this schedule, and by 1999 the only passenger rail station in the valley is located in a remote part of Palm Springs which is served at inconvenient hours.

Since at least 1991, there have been a number of studies seeking to implement a more regional service via various modes and which at the time, also studied service all the way to Calexico. Funding for the current project headed by the Riverside County Transportation Commission (RCTC) initially came from the SunLine Transit Agency, with further support by federal grants, the California State Rail Assistance program, the California Department of Transportation (Caltrans), and the Federal Railroad Administration (FRA). Long been seen as the preferred operator, Amtrak was formally identified in the Alternative Analysis phase.

A draft environmental impact report was released by the RCTC in May 2021. By July 2022, Commissioners with the RCTC certified the route. In September 2022, they planned to seek Federal funding of $60 million for more in-depth studies on infrastructure and station locations. The project is estimated to cost $1 billion, of which $23 million had been raised as of 2022.

In December 2023, the Federal Railroad Administration accepted an application by Caltrans to enter the Coachella–Los Angeles route into its Corridor Identification and Development Program. The program grants $500,000 toward service planning and prioritizes the route for future federal funding.
