= Indio station =

Train station in Indio, California, United States

Indio, CA
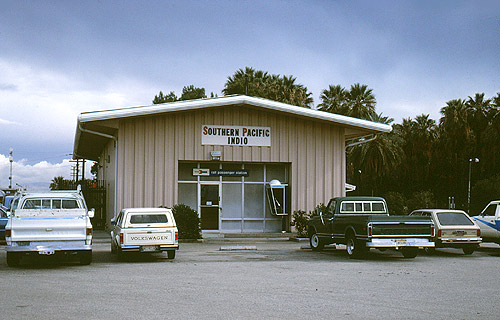
- The Southern Pacific station building, March 1983

General information
- Location: 45-050 Jackson Street; Indio, California 92202
- Coordinates: 33.721023°N 116.215774°W
- Bus operators: Greyhound Lines

History
- Opened: May 29, 1876
- Closed: October 1998

Former services
Preceding station	Amtrak	Following station
Palm Springs toward Los Angeles	Sunset Limited	Yuma toward Orlando
Palm Springs toward Los Angeles	Texas Eagle	Yuma toward Chicago
Preceding station	Southern Pacific Railroad	Following station
Palm Springs toward Los Angeles	Sunset Route	Coachella toward New Orleans
Location

Indio is a former and future train station in Indio, California.

Rail service began on May 29, 1876, by the Southern Pacific. The station was a stop on the transcontinental Sunset Limited; that service was commuted to Amtrak in 1971. The Eagle (later Texas Eagle) started serving the city with that line's commencement. Indio continued to see service until October 1998, closing due to low ridership. On the south side of the tracks is the Indio Bus Station, served by Greyhound Lines.

The Riverside County Transportation Commission was awarded $8.6 million in 2019 to construct a temporary platform to reestablish limited service to the city during major festivals, but these plans were canceled in 2020 amid the COVID-19 pandemic after arrangements with Union Pacific could not be resolved. The commission is also investigating the possibility of reinstating normal passenger service from Los Angeles to Indio along the Coachella Valley Rail (CV Rail) corridor.
