= Palm Springs station =

Train station in Palm Springs, California, US

Palm Springs, CA
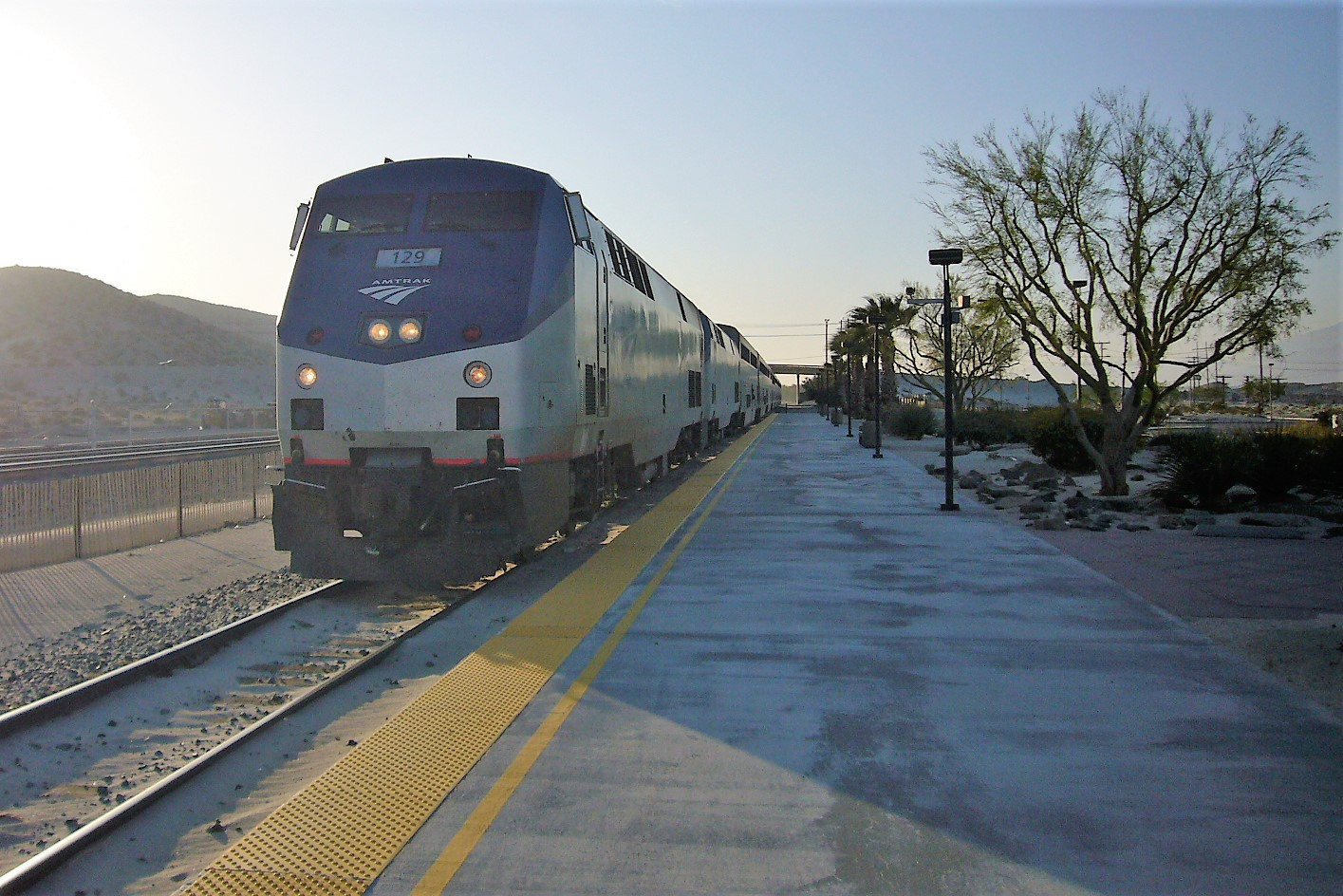
- The Sunset Limited at Palm Springs station in 2008

General information
- Location: Palm Springs Station Road at North Indian Canyon Drive; Palm Springs, California; United States
- Coordinates: 33°53′52″N 116°32′53″W
- Owner: City of Palm Springs
- Line: UP Yuma Subdivision
- Platforms: 1 side platform
- Tracks: 1

Construction
- Parking: 10 spaces

Other information
- Station code: Amtrak: PSN

History
- Opened: June 1997

Passengers
- FY 2025: 1,688 (Amtrak)

Services
Preceding station	Amtrak	Following station
Ontario toward Los Angeles	Sunset Limited	Yuma toward New Orleans
Ontario toward Los Angeles	Texas Eagle	Yuma toward Chicago
Former services
Preceding station	Amtrak	Following station
Ontario toward Los Angeles	Sunset Limited	Indio toward Orlando
Ontario toward Los Angeles	Texas Eagle	Indio toward Chicago
Preceding station	Southern Pacific Railroad	Following station
Colton toward Los Angeles	Sunset Route	Indio toward New Orleans
Location

Palm Springs station is an Amtrak train station in the Garnet community of Palm Springs, California, United States. The station is served by the thrice-weekly round trip of the combined Sunset Limited/Texas Eagle. The station has a single side platform and an open-air shelter. It was built in 1999, and the property is owned by the City of Palm Springs.

The station was temporarily closed from May 20 to August 25, 2021, after desert sandstorms caused sand drifts near the station, burying the tracks and making it unsafe for passengers. The station temporarily closed again on March 28, 2023, and had other temporary closures in 2024. As of 2026, Amtrak warns that service to the station may be suspended without notice due to sandstorms.

By March 2024, modification of the platform for accessibility was planned to be complete later in 2024.
