= Yuma Crossing =

Historic site in Arizona and California, US

- Yuma Crossing and Associated Sites
- U.S. National Register of Historic Places
- U.S. National Historic Landmark District
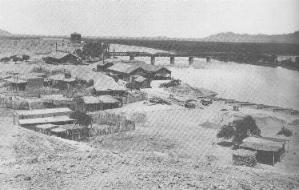

- Location within California Location within the United States
- Nearest city: Winterhaven, California and Yuma, Arizona
- Coordinates: 32°43′43″N 114°36′56″W
- Area: 149 acres (60 ha)
- Built: 1852
- NRHP reference No.: 66000197

Significant dates
- Added to NRHP: November 13, 1966
- Designated NHLD: November 13, 1966

Yuma Crossing is a site in Arizona and California that is significant for its association with transportation and communication across the Colorado River. It connected New Spain and Las Californias in the Spanish Colonial period in and also during the Western expansion of the United States. Features of the Arizona side include the Yuma Quartermaster Depot and Yuma Territorial Prison. Features on the California Side include Fort Yuma, which protected the area from 1850 to 1885.

== History ==
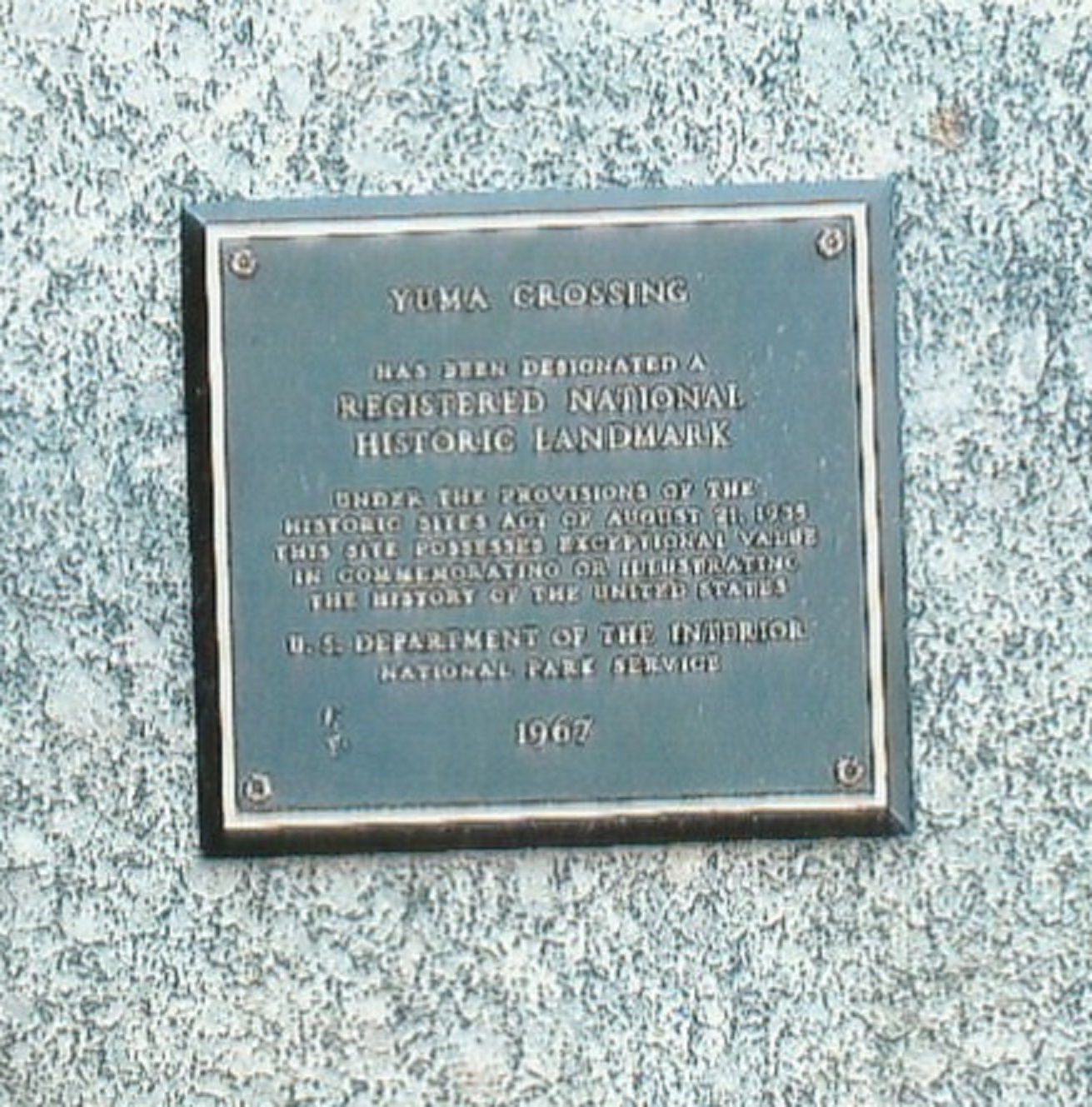
Yuma Crossing Marker

The history of the Yuma Crossing began at the formation of two massive granite outcroppings on the Colorado River. The narrowing of the river provided the only crossing point for a thousand miles, thus making it a focal point for the Patayan tribes, and later the Quechan.

In 1540, well before the British Europeans touched Plymouth Rock in 1620, Yuma's European history began here with the arrival of Spanish explorer Hernando de Alarcón. It was not until after the 17th and 18th century explorations of the padres Kino and Garcés that the crossing came to be used by the Spanish expeditions of Juan Bautista de Anza and others along this route from 1774. This route, sometimes called the Sonora Road, ran from the Spanish Tubac Presidio, in Sonora to Alta California. An attempt to establish missions and colonize the area of the crossing was made by the Spanish soon after but it failed, when the formerly friendly Quechan were angered to the point of a violent revolt that ended the missions, the colony and the use of the land route until the 19th century. Mexican expeditions mollified the Quechan and persuaded them to allow the use of the crossings, reopening the Sonora Road to Alta California from the later 1820s.

Much later the Yuma Crossing became the focal point for travel to the Wild West, from the 1840s California Gold Rush era to the arrival of the railroad in the 1877, and finally the Ocean-to-Ocean Bridge, which linked the East coast and the West coast in one land route.

Immediately after the Mexican–American War in 1848, the U.S. Army built Fort Yuma here to protect travelers from Indians raiding the area. It was the center point of conflict in the Yuma War of 1850–53. From 1864–1890, the fort and nearby facilities was the main army base to support the US Army's efforts to control the Indians throughout the greater southwest.

At about the same time, the Butterfield Stage established a stagecoach station here for their main line coming from the east to California.

It was declared a National Historic Landmark in 1966, under the name Yuma Crossing and Associated Sites.

== National Heritage Area ==
The Yuma Crossing National Heritage Area is a U.S. National Heritage Area. It was the only lower Colorado River crossing point in the 18th and 19th centuries for non-Native American travelers and immigrants. The Heritage Area is part of the Yuma Crossing and Associated Sites on the National Register of Historic Places and a National Historic Landmark, in Arizona and California.

As with other U.S. National Heritage Areas, the Yuma Crossing National Heritage Area is a local entity in partnership with various stakeholders. At Yuma Crossing, the stakeholders are particularly diverse, including Indian tribes, agricultural interests, environmental and wildlife non-profit organizations, as well as many federal, states, and local agencies.

=== History park ===
The Yuma Crossing National Heritage Area comprises several historical locations, including the Yuma Quartermaster Depot State Historic Park (formerly known as Yuma Crossing State Historic Park), the Yuma Territorial Prison, and Fort Yuma. These sites are situated within the vital Yuma East and West Wetlands, with the Castle Dome, Chocolate (Arizona) and Chocolate (California) Mountains mountain ranges in the background.

The heritage area's interpretive themes include Yuma's importance as a cultural crossroads, emphasizing the region's intersection of three major cultures: Anglo-American, Native American, and Hispanic-Latino. The heritage area recognizes that this rich blend of traditions can best be sustained by their continued expression through architecture, art, music, food, and folkways within the heritage area.

== Juan Bautista de Anza National Historic Trail ==
The Yuma Crossing is a designated site of the Juan Bautista de Anza National Historic Trail, a National Park Service area in the United States National Trails System.

== Habitat restoration ==
The Yuma Heritage Area has championed a wetland and riparian habitat restoration project for the East Wetlands, including returning the Colorado's water flow, in a multiyear, multimillion-dollar effort. In 2004, heritage area partners secured a Clean Water Act permit from the U.S. Army Corps of Engineers to begin restoration work. More than 200 acres (0.81 km^{2}) of nonnative invasive species vegetation have been removed and more than 130 acres (0.53 km^{2}) have been replanted with cottonwoods, willow, mesquite, native bunchgrasses, and palo verde trees. A one-mile (1.6 km) length of back channel has also been excavated, and some 20,000 new trees were planted in 2006.

To date, ten different funding sources have provided almost $6 million toward the eventual goal of $18–20 million to complete the project.

=== Area plant life ===
- Fremont cottonwood – Populus fremontii
- Catclaw Acacia – Acacia greggii
- Blue Palo Verde – Parkinsonia florida
- Velvet mesquite – Prosopis velutina
- Screwbean Mesquite – Prosopis pubescens – "Tornillo"
- Honey Mesquite – Prosopis glandulosa
- Goodding's black willow – Salix gooddingii
- Arroyo Willow – Salix lasiolepis

== See also ==
- Alta California
- History of California through 1899
- John Joel Glanton
- List of bridges documented by the Historic American Engineering Record in Arizona
- List of historic properties in Yuma, Arizona
- Mesquite Bosque
- National Register of Historic Places listings in Yuma County, Arizona
- National Register of Historic Places listings in Imperial County, California
- Quechan
- Territorial evolution of California
