= Saint Helena station =

Saint Helena
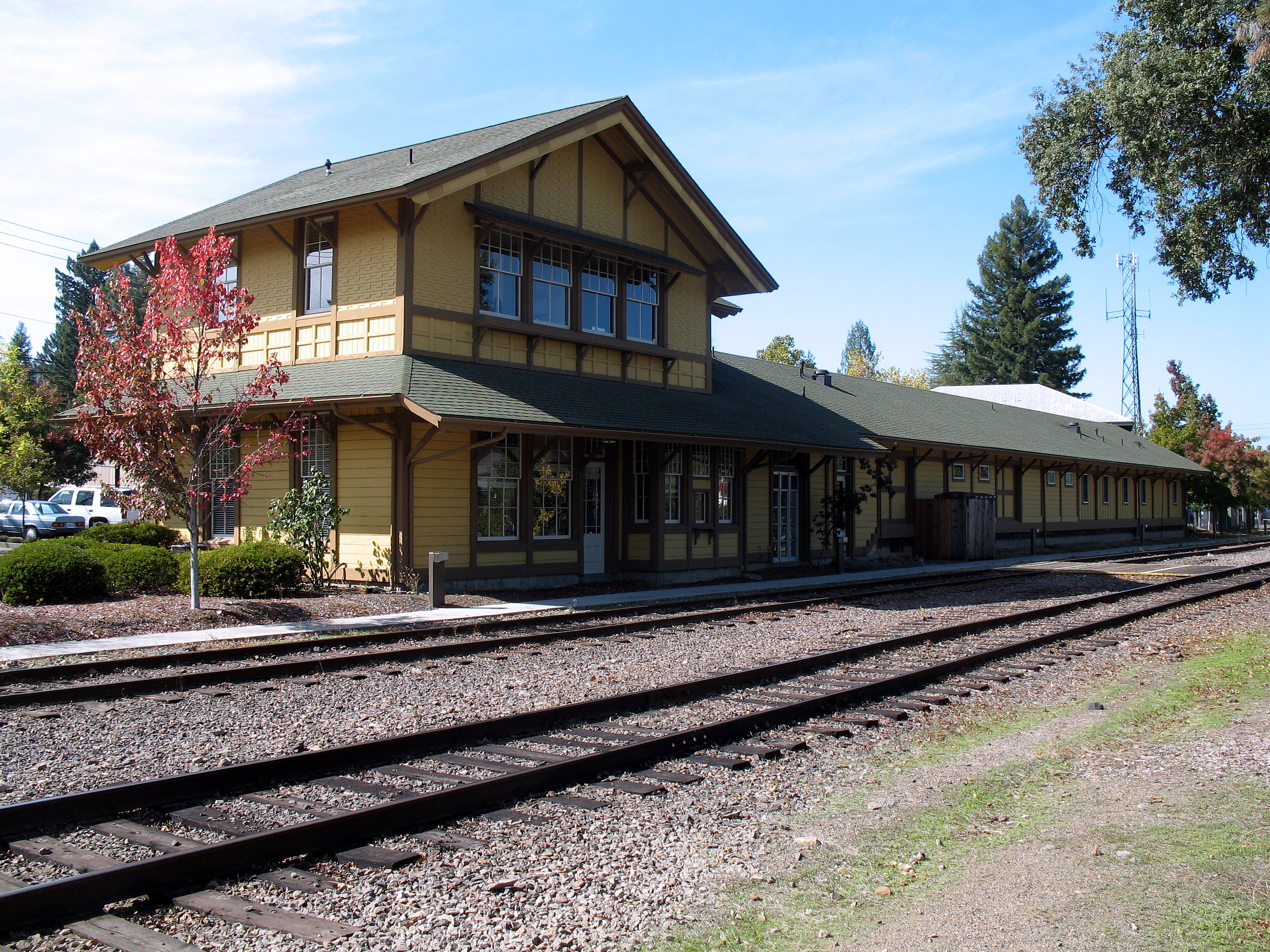
- The depot in 2011

General information
- Location: 1500 Railroad Avenue, St. Helena, California
- Owner: Southern Pacific

History
- Opened: c. 1895
- Closed: 1929 (passenger); 1975 (freight)
- Rebuilt: 1996

Services
Preceding station	Southern Pacific Railroad	Following station
Krug toward Calistoga	Calistoga – Vallejo	Thomann toward Vallejo
- Saint Helena Southern Pacific Railroad Depot
- U.S. National Register of Historic Places
- Location within California Location within the United States
- Coordinates: 38.5074620666°N 122.47105666°W
- Area: less than 1 acre (0.40 ha)
- Built: c. 1895
- Built by: Southern Pacific
- Architectural style: Late Victorian
- NRHP reference No.: 96001535
- Added to NRHP: January 7, 1997
Location

The Saint Helena Southern Pacific Railroad Depot is a former train station in St. Helena, California.

== History ==
As European wineries fought a Phylloxera epidemic at the end of the 1800s, Southern Pacific anticipated increased fruit shipments from the Napa wine region and sought to expand their operations in the area. Built to Southern Pacific standard plan No. 18, a two-story combination building, the Saint Helena Depot opened around 1895. The opening of the Napa Valley Electric Railway in 1904 greatly reduced passenger demand, and services ceased in 1929; freight continued to be shipped from the depot.

The station building appeared as the fictional Harrington, Vermont train station in the film Pollyanna, shot in 1959. The rail line and depot were formally abandoned by Southern Pacific in 1975, but the right of way was reactivated with the commencement of the Napa Valley Wine Train excursion service.

The Depot suffered fire damage twice in 1989 and in 1993, but was largely restored after receiving extensive modernization and rehabilitation in 1996 as approved by the National Park Service. The station was added to the National Register of Historic Places on January 7, 1997.

== See also ==
- Benicia Southern Pacific Railroad Passenger Depot — another SP depot built to the same design in California
