= Benicia station =

Benicia
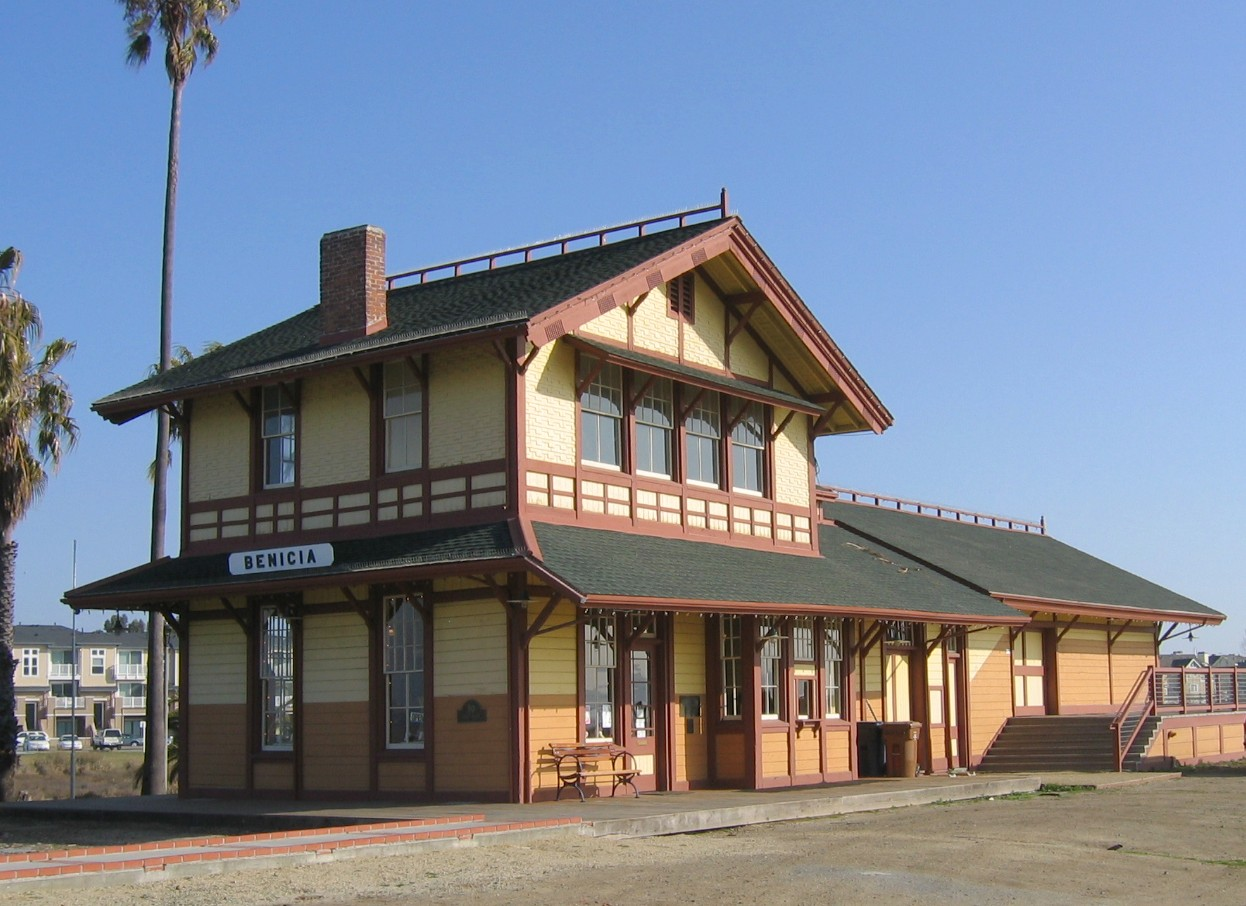
- The station building in 2007

General information
- Location: 90 1st Street; Benicia, California

History
- Opened: 1902

Former services
Preceding station	Southern Pacific Railroad	Following station
Port Costa via ferry toward Oakland Pier	Overland Route	Bahia toward Ogden
Port Costa via ferry toward Oakland Pier	Shasta Route	Bahia toward Portland
- Benicia Southern Pacific Railroad Passenger Depot
- U.S. National Register of Historic Places
- Coordinates: 38°02′41″N 122°09′44″W
- Built by: Southern Pacific Railroad
- NRHP reference No.: 100001664
- Added to NRHP: September 28, 2017
Location

Benicia station is a former train station in Benicia, California. It was added to the National Register of Historic Places in 2017 as Benicia Southern Pacific Railroad Passenger Depot.

== History ==
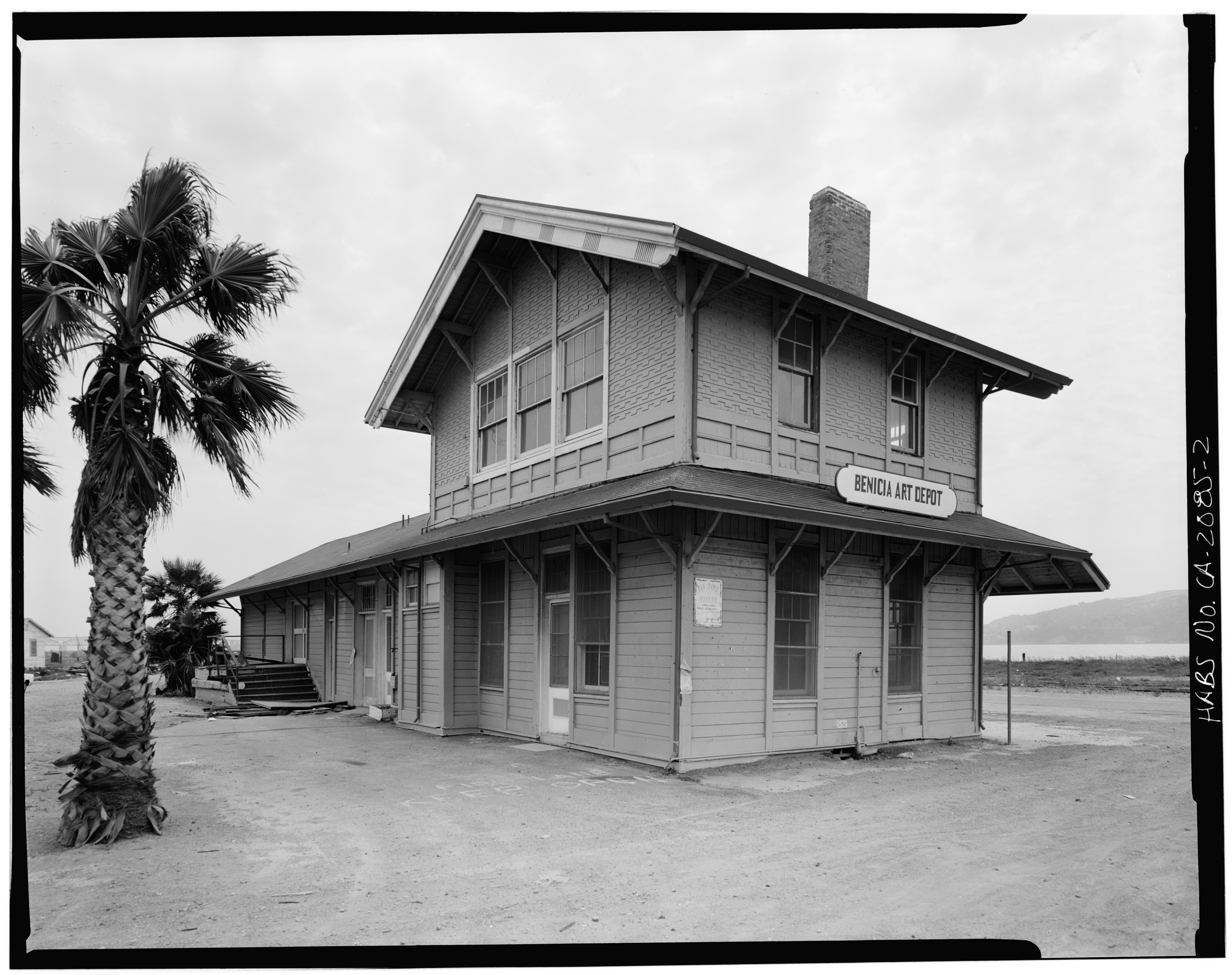
Historic American Buildings Survey photograph of the station building, c.

The station building was constructed in 1897 for the town of Banta, California. It was built to Southern Pacific standard design No. 18. The Southern Pacific moved the building to Benicia in 1902 to serve the town and the ferries crossing of the Carquinez Strait, the Solano and Contra Costa. Services greatly declined after 1930 and the opening of the Benicia–Martinez Bridge, which rendered the ferry transfer unnecessary. The depot housed the station agent and their family until 1958. It was sold to the City of Benicia in 1974 and rehabilitated between 1999 and 2001.

It was added to the National Register of Historic Places on September 28, 2017.

== See also ==
- Saint Helena Southern Pacific Railroad Depot — another SP depot built to the same design in California
