= Yuma station =

Rail station in Arizona

Yuma, AZ
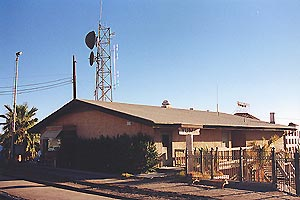

General information
- Location: 281 South Gila Street; Yuma, Arizona; United States
- Coordinates: 32.72301°N 114.61608°W
- Line: UP Yuma / Gila Subdivisions
- Platforms: 1 island platform
- Tracks: 2

Construction
- Accessible: Yes

Other information
- Station code: Amtrak: YUM

History
- Opened: September 30, 1877
- Rebuilt: 1926

Passengers
- FY 2025: 4,722 (Amtrak)

Services
Preceding station	Amtrak	Following station
Palm Springs toward Los Angeles	Sunset Limited	Maricopa toward New Orleans
Palm Springs toward Los Angeles	Texas Eagle	Maricopa toward Chicago
Former services
Preceding station	Amtrak	Following station
Indio (bypassed 1998) toward Los Angeles	Sunset Limited	Phoenix (until 1996 reroute) toward Miami
Indio (bypassed 1998) toward Los Angeles	Texas Eagle	Phoenix (until 1996 reroute) toward Chicago
Preceding station	Southern Pacific Railroad	Following station
Niland toward Los Angeles	Sunset Route	Wellton toward New Orleans
Preceding station	Heritage railroads	Following station
Steam towards Gadsden	Yuma Valley Railway Closed 2005	Terminus
- Southern Pacific Railroad Depot
- Formerly listed on the U.S. National Register of Historic Places
- Location: Gila St., Yuma, Arizona
- Coordinates: 32°43′24″N 114°36′54″W
- Built: 1926
- Architects: Arguello, A.L.; Wakefield, Ceril H.
- Architectural style: Spanish Colonial Revival
- Demolished: 1994
- NRHP reference No.: 76000384

Significant dates
- Added to NRHP: June 22, 1976
- Removed from NRHP: August 22, 2019
Location

Yuma station is an Amtrak station at 281 South Gila Street in Yuma, Arizona, United States. Passenger rail service is provided thrice-weekly in each direction by the Sunset Limited and the Texas Eagle over this portion of its route. The station's island platform, which is adjacent to the station building site, are accessible through a short pedestrian tunnel.

== History ==
The Southern Pacific Railroad began operations to Yuma on September 30, 1877.

The railroad built a new Spanish Colonial Revival-style station in 1926. Routes that served the station include the Sunset Limited, the Golden State, and the Imperial.

After Southern Pacific ceased passenger operations upon Amtrak's start in 1971, the station housed the Yuma Fine Arts Museum. The depot was listed in the National Register of Historic Places in 1976. The structure was devastated in a May 1993 fire and was razed in the summer of 1994. It was delisted from the National Register in 2019. The location is now used for the Yuma Armed Forces Park.

== Schedule ==
There are three weekly trains in each direction:

- Westbound Train #1/421 departs at 11:49 pm Tuesday, Thursday and Sunday
- Eastbound Train #2/422 departs at 2:47 am Monday, Thursday and Sunday

Train #1 is the westbound New Orleans–Los Angeles Sunset Limited, while train #421 refers to the through coach and sleeper transferred from the Texas Eagle (Chicago–San Antonio) to the Sunset Limited in San Antonio.

Train #2 is the eastbound Sunset Limited, traveling from Los Angeles to New Orleans, with a through coach and sleeper designated as Train #422, which is detached in San Antonio and transferred to the Chicago-bound Texas Eagle #22.

== See also ==
- List of historic properties in Yuma, Arizona
- Southern Pacific Freight Depot (Yuma, Arizona) – also NRHP listed.
- Southern Pacific Railroad Passenger Coach Car-S.P. X7 – also NRHP listed.
- National Register of Historic Places listings in Yuma County, Arizona
