= Southern Pacific Freight Depot (Yuma, Arizona) =

- U.S. National Register of Historic Places
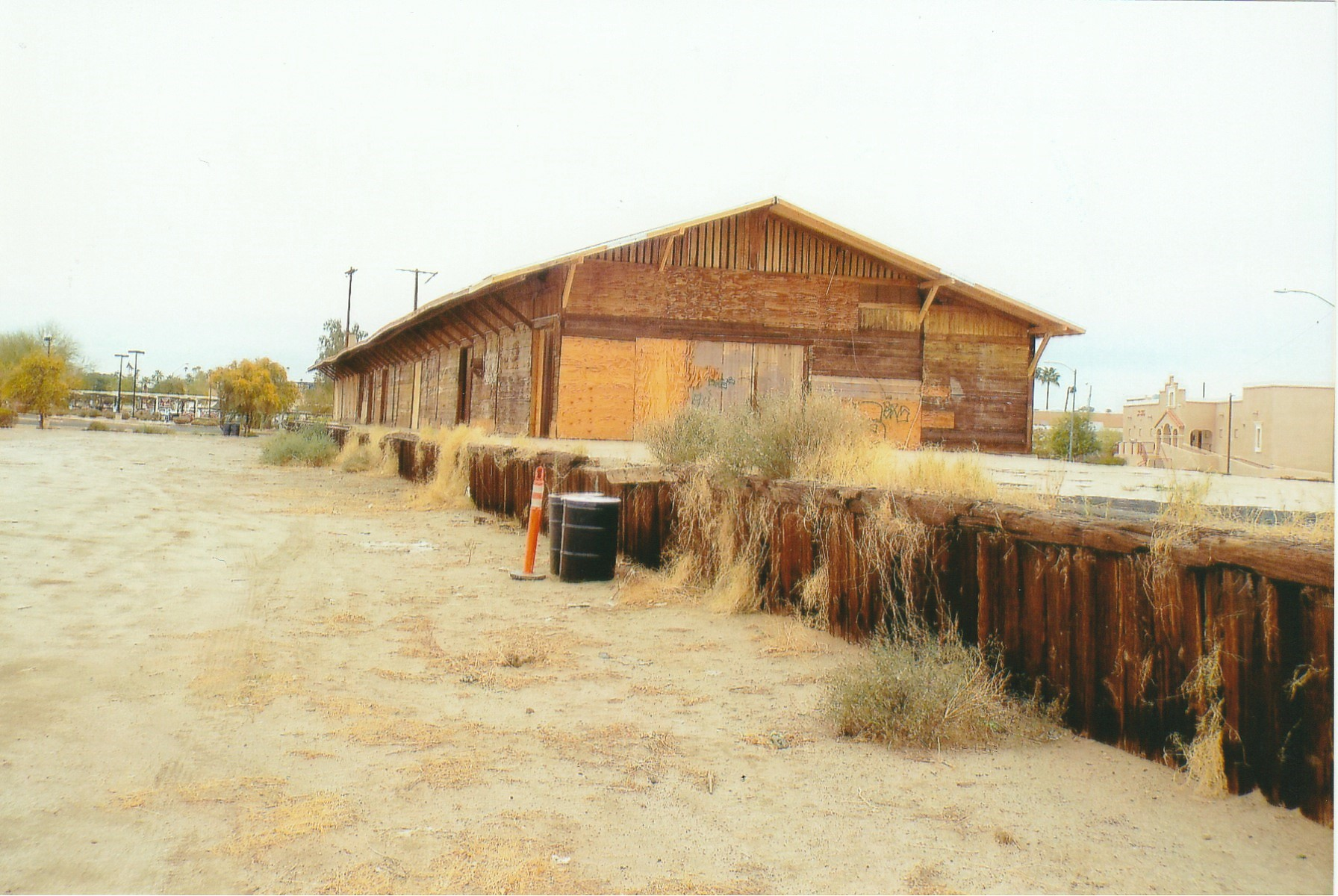
- Southern Pacific Freight Depot

- Location within Arizona Location within the United States
- Location: Main St., Yuma, Arizona
- Coordinates: 32°43′13″N 114°37′3″W
- Built: 1891
- Architect: Southern Pacific Railroad Co.
- Architectural style: Stick/Eastlake
- MPS: Yuma MRA
- NRHP reference No.: 87000614
- Added to NRHP: April 24, 1987

The Southern Pacific Freight Depot was a train depot in Yuma, Arizona that was built in 1891, constructed with redwood shiplap and in the wooden Stick—Eastlake architectural motifs of the Victorian Queen Anne Style.

An office was added in 1917.

It was listed on the National Register of Historic Places (NRHP) in 1987.

The building burned down in an arson fire March 27, 2024, and later fully demolished in August 2024.

== See also ==
- List of historic properties in Yuma, Arizona
- Southern Pacific Railroad Depot (Yuma, Arizona) – also NRHP-listed.
- National Register of Historic Places listings in Yuma County, Arizona
