= National Register of Historic Places listings in Yolo County, California =

Location of Yolo County in California

This is a list of the National Register of Historic Places listings in Yolo County, California.

This is intended to be a complete list of the properties and districts on the National Register of Historic Places in Yolo County, California, United States. Latitude and longitude coordinates are provided for many National Register properties and districts; these locations may be seen together in an online map.

There are 26 properties and districts listed on the National Register in the county. Another property was once listed but has been removed.

This National Park Service list is complete through NPS recent listings posted September 4, 2026.

== Current listings ==
| | Name on the Register | Image | Date listed | Location | City or town | Description |
|---|---|---|---|---|---|---|
| 1 | Animal Science Building | Animal Science Building | June 17, 1986 (#86001354) | University of California, West Quad and Peter J. Shields Ave. 38°32′27″N 121°45′00″W | Davis | |
| 2 | R. H. Beamer House | R. H. Beamer House | August 2, 1982 (#82002283) | 19 3rd St. 38°41′02″N 121°46′09″W | Woodland | |
| 3 | Canon School | Canon School | June 13, 1972 (#72000264) | 0.5 mi (0.80 km) north of Brooks; 38°45′13″N 122°09′13″W | Brooks | |
| 4 | Davis Subway | Davis Subway | June 26, 1998 (#98000713) | Richards Boulevard between Olive Dr. and 1st St. 38°32′30″N 121°44′20″W | Davis | |
| 5 | Downtown Woodland Historic District | Downtown Woodland Historic District | June 22, 1999 (#99000471) | Roughly along Main St. from Elm St. to 3rd St. 38°40′40″N 121°46′20″W | Woodland | |
| 6 | Dresbach-Hunt-Boyer House | Dresbach-Hunt-Boyer House | September 13, 1976 (#76000540) | 604 2nd St. 38°32′36″N 121°44′22″W | Davis | |
| 7 | William B. Gibson House | William B. Gibson House | November 7, 1976 (#76000542) | 512 Gibson Rd. 38°39′45″N 121°46′22″W | Woodland | |
| 8 | Hotel Woodland | Hotel Woodland | October 21, 1994 (#94001225) | 426 Main St. 38°40′38″N 121°46′26″W | Woodland | |
| 9 | I Street Bridge | I Street Bridge | April 22, 1982 (#82002233) | Former State Route 16; 38°35′10″N 121°30′23″W | West Sacramento | |
| 10 | I.O.O.F. Building | I.O.O.F. Building | February 25, 1982 (#82002284) | 723 Main St. 38°40′40″N 121°46′11″W | Woodland | |
| 11 | Main Street Historic District- Winters | Main Street Historic District- Winters | January 2, 1997 (#96001536) | 1-48 Main St. 38°31′18″N 121°58′06″W | Winters | |
| 12 | James Moore House | | November 16, 1978 (#78000827) | Southwest of Woodland; 38°38′30″N 121°50′14″W | Woodland | |
| 13 | Nelson Ranch | Nelson Ranch | July 17, 1972 (#72000266) | County Road 18C between County Road 102 and California State Route 113; 38°42′40″N 121°44′23″W | Woodland | |
| 14 | Porter Building | Porter Building | November 30, 1978 (#78000828) | 501-511 Main St. 38°40′40″N 121°46′24″W | Woodland | |
| 15 | Rumsey Town Hall | Rumsey Town Hall | June 19, 1972 (#72000265) | State Route 16 at Manzanita St. 38°53′19″N 122°14′12″W | Rumsey | |
| 16 | Southern Pacific Railroad Station | Southern Pacific Railroad Station | November 7, 1976 (#76000541) | H and 2nd Sts. 38°32′37″N 121°44′12″W | Davis | |
| 17 | TB-9 | TB-9 | April 5, 2016 (#16000153) | SW corner of Old Davis Rd. and Hutchinson Dr., University of California, Davis; 38°32′23″N 121°44′46″W | Davis | Temporary Building 9 |
| 18 | Tower Bridge | Tower Bridge | June 24, 1982 (#82004845) | State Route 275 across the Sacramento River; 38°34′48″N 121°30′30″W | West Sacramento | |
| 19 | Joshua B. Tufts House | Joshua B. Tufts House | September 6, 1979 (#79000571) | 434 J St. 38°32′52″N 121°44′06″W | Davis | |
| 20 | Union Church of Dunnigan | Union Church of Dunnigan | July 10, 2003 (#03000613) | 3615 County Road 89A; 38°53′11″N 121°58′02″W | Dunnigan | |
| 21 | Walnut Street School | Walnut Street School | March 20, 2006 (#06000144) | 175 Walnut St. 38°40′50″N 121°46′37″W | Woodland | |
| 17 | Washington Firehouse | Washington Firehouse | April 17, 2017 (#100000882) | 317 3rd St. 38°35′17″N 121°30′36″W | West Sacramento | |
| 22 | Woodland Opera House | Woodland Opera House | November 5, 1971 (#71000212) | 320 2nd St. 38°40′40″N 121°46′15″W | Woodland | |
| 23 | Woodland Public Library | Woodland Public Library | September 28, 1981 (#81000183) | 250 1st St. 38°40′45″N 121°46′21″W | Woodland | |
| 24 | Yolo Branch Library | Yolo Branch Library | December 10, 1990 (#90001810) | 200 Sacramento St. 38°44′00″N 121°48′22″W | Yolo | |
| 25 | Yolo County Courthouse | Yolo County Courthouse | February 26, 1987 (#86003660) | 725 Court St. 38°40′45″N 121°46′16″W | Woodland | |

== Former listing ==
| | Name on the Register | Image | Date listed | Date removed | Location | City or town | Description |
|---|---|---|---|---|---|---|---|
| 1 | First Pacific Coast Salmon Cannery Site | | April 6, 1974 (#66000938) | July 14, 2004 | On the Sacramento River, opposite the foot of K Street | Broderick | Former National Historic Landmark |

== See also ==
- List of National Historic Landmarks in California
- National Register of Historic Places listings in California
- California Historical Landmarks in Yolo County, California
