= Chicago Cafe =

Restaurant in Woodland, California, United States

Coordinates: 38.6774°N 121.7757°W

The Chicago Cafe is a Chinese restaurant in Woodland, California. It is one of the oldest Chinese restaurants in the United States. The restaurant was founded in the early 20th century, either in 1910 (according to researchers at University of California, Davis) or 1903 (according to the Fong family). In 1903, city directories excluded Chinese businesses, making it difficult to verify if the restaurant had opened in 1903.

The restaurant has been owned by three generations of the Fong family. The menu has barely changed since the 1950s, and it includes food items associated with early American Chinese cuisine, such as egg foo young and chow mein. Located at 411 Main Street, it is close to the Yolo County Courthouse. The interior includes black swivel diner stools. In 2025, it was announced that the restaurant was for sale.
