= Porter Building =

- U.S. National Register of Historic Places
- U.S. Historic district – Contributing property
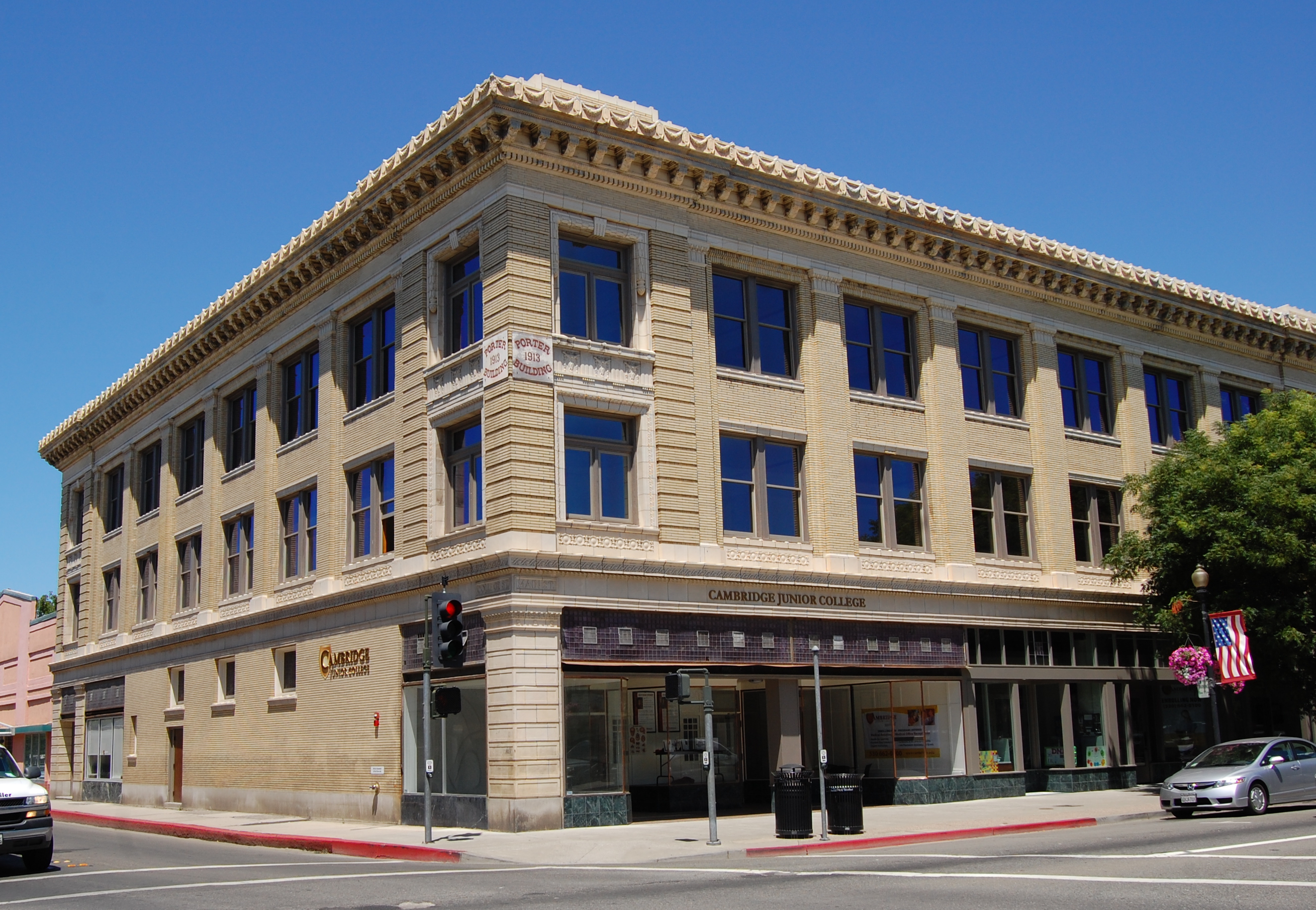
- The Porter Building as it appears in 2011.

- Location within California Location within the United States
- Location: 501-511 Main St., Woodland, California
- Coordinates: 38°40′40″N 121°46′24″W
- Area: 0.4 acres (0.16 ha)
- Built: 1913
- Architect: W.H. Weeks
- Architectural style: Late 19th and 20th Century Revivals, Second Renaissance Revival
- Part of: Downtown Woodland Historic District (ID99000471)
- NRHP reference No.: 78000828
- Added to NRHP: November 30, 1978

The Porter Building is a historic building listed on the National Register of Historic Places located in the Downtown Historic District of Woodland, California.

== History ==
The building was designed in 1913 by architect W.H. Weeks, architect of many other landmarks in Woodland such as the Woodland Opera House and the Yolo County Courthouse. Construction bids were accepted and Earle L. Younger of San Jose (later a Woodland resident) was the lowest bidder. The building's exterior includes buff-colored Roman brick with elaborately decorated cornice and an arched entrance way that leads into the building's lobby. The building had many modern amenities that were rare for its era, some of which were "firsts" for Woodland, including an electric elevator, steam heating system, and telephone service in each office. The successful completion of this major construction project was of great benefit to Younger, and helped him become one of the more popular commercial builders in Woodland until the 1940s.

Today the building is a part of the Downtown Woodland Historic District. During much of the 2000s, the building was left vacant, but it was announced in December 2009 that a private community college will be moving into the building. A project to retrofit the building to bring it up to date with current safety standards is underway. Changes to the interior of the building will take place in preparation for the classrooms and offices it will house. The current plans are to keep as many preexisting walls as possible. The steam heating system that was originally a luxury for the building is still intact, but a new heating and air conditioning system will also be put in place. The exterior of the building will be restored to its original state in 1913. The architect for the remodeling of the building is Duane Thompson.
