= Downtown Woodland Historic District =

Historic district in California, United States

- U.S. National Register of Historic Places
- U.S. Historic district
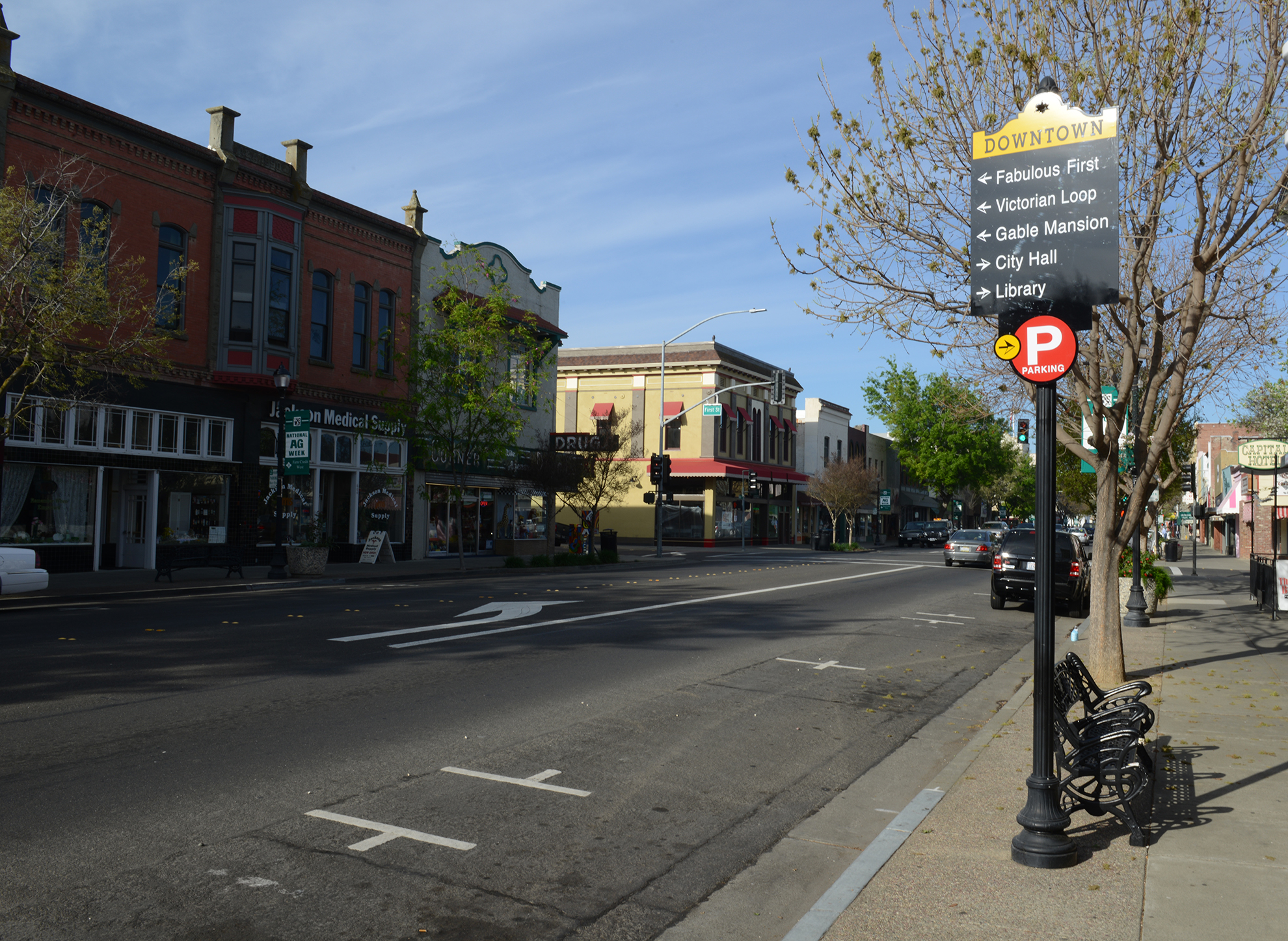

- Location within California Location within the United States
- Location: Roughly along Main St. from Elm St. to Third St., Woodland, California
- Coordinates: 38°40′40″N 121°46′20″W
- Architect: Weeks, William H.
- Architectural style: Mission/Spanish Revival, Classical Revival
- NRHP reference No.: 99000471
- Added to NRHP: June 22, 1999

The Downtown Woodland Historic District is a historic district in Woodland, California. The district encompasses roughly 370 acres (1.5 km^{2}) and 59 contributing buildings. The district's contributing buildings span from 1866 to 1947 and include four individually listed properties on the National Register of Historic Places: the Woodland Public Library (1905), the Woodland Opera House (1896), the Yolo County Courthouse (1917), and the Hotel Woodland (1927). The earliest contributing structure is a hardware store at 537B Main Street dating from 1866. The district encompasses a range of architectural styles including Commercial Italianate, Mission/Spanish Revival, Classical Revival, Richardson Romanesque, Streamline Moderne, and Second Renaissance Revival. Five of the contributing buildings are designated as individually listed NRHP properties, and the district also includes the IOOF Building (1905) and the Yolo County Savings Bank (1903) among its notable commercial structures.. It is a California Historical Landmark and is listed as a historic district on the National Register of Historic Places.

== Contributing properties ==
Historic district contributing properties include:

- Hotel Woodland
- Porter Building
- Woodland Opera House
- Woodland Public Library
- The Jackson Building

== See also ==
- California Historical Landmarks in Yolo County, California
- National Register of Historic Places listings in Yolo County, California
- Index: Historic districts in California
