= Yolo County Fair =

Annual event in Woodland, California

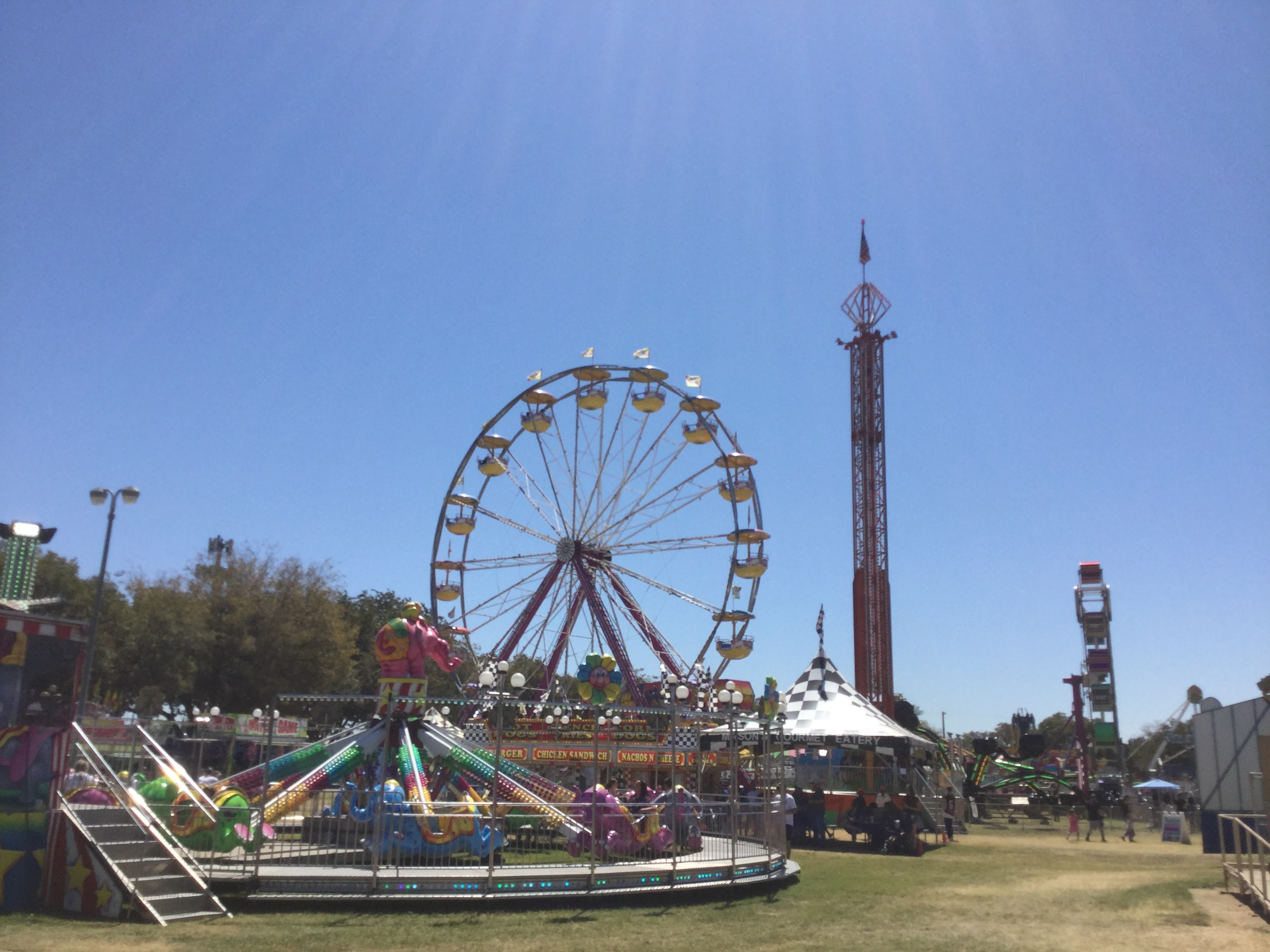
- Status: Active
- Genre: County fair
- Begins: 14 August 2024
- Ends: 18 August 2024
- Frequency: Annually
- Locations: Yolo County Fairgrounds; Woodland, California; United States
- Coordinates: 33°28′10.18″N 112°05′49.86″W
- Years active: 91
- Inaugurated: 1935
- Most recent: 16–20 August 2023
- Area: Yolo County
- Website: www.yolocountyfair.net

The Yolo County Fair is held in Woodland, California, in the middle of August each year, running Wednesday afternoon through Sunday evening. Started in 1935 (current site in 1940), it is the largest free admission fair in the state of California.

Since there was no fair in 2020 caused by COVID-19 pandemic, the 82nd was deferred to 2021, which went virtual. World War II was the cause of the fair's cancellation between 1942 and 1945.

== Events ==
There are demolition derbies in the fairground's arena, local Future Farmers of America (FFA) exhibits, as well as several other agricultural related competitions and auctions. There are also several exhibition halls where fair-goers can peruse through stands set up by local businesses and groups. One of the newest and most popular attractions of the county fair is the "Yolo County Fair Vocal Showcase" based on the TV show American Idol.

== Gallery ==
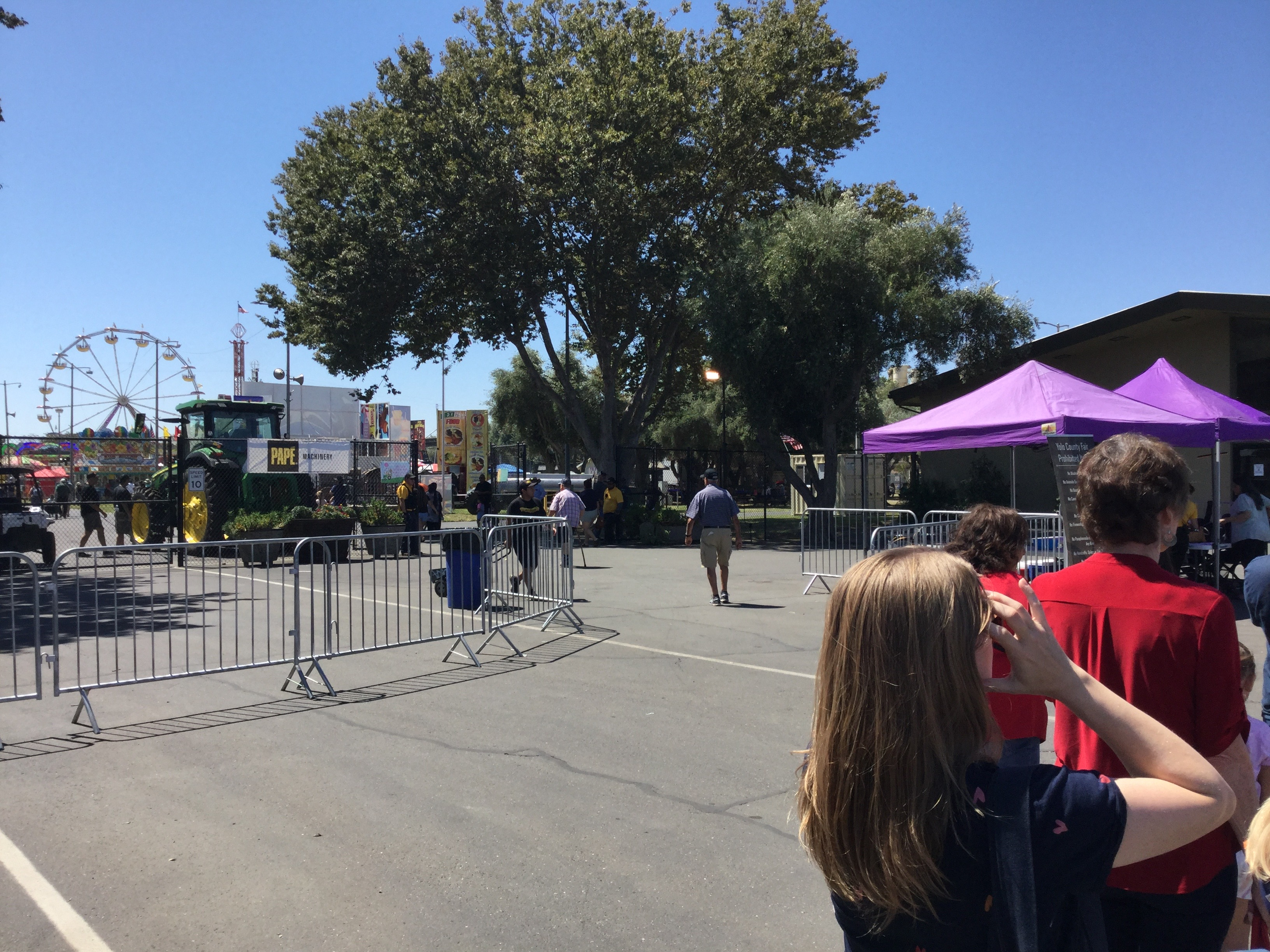
Gate to the Yolo County Fair

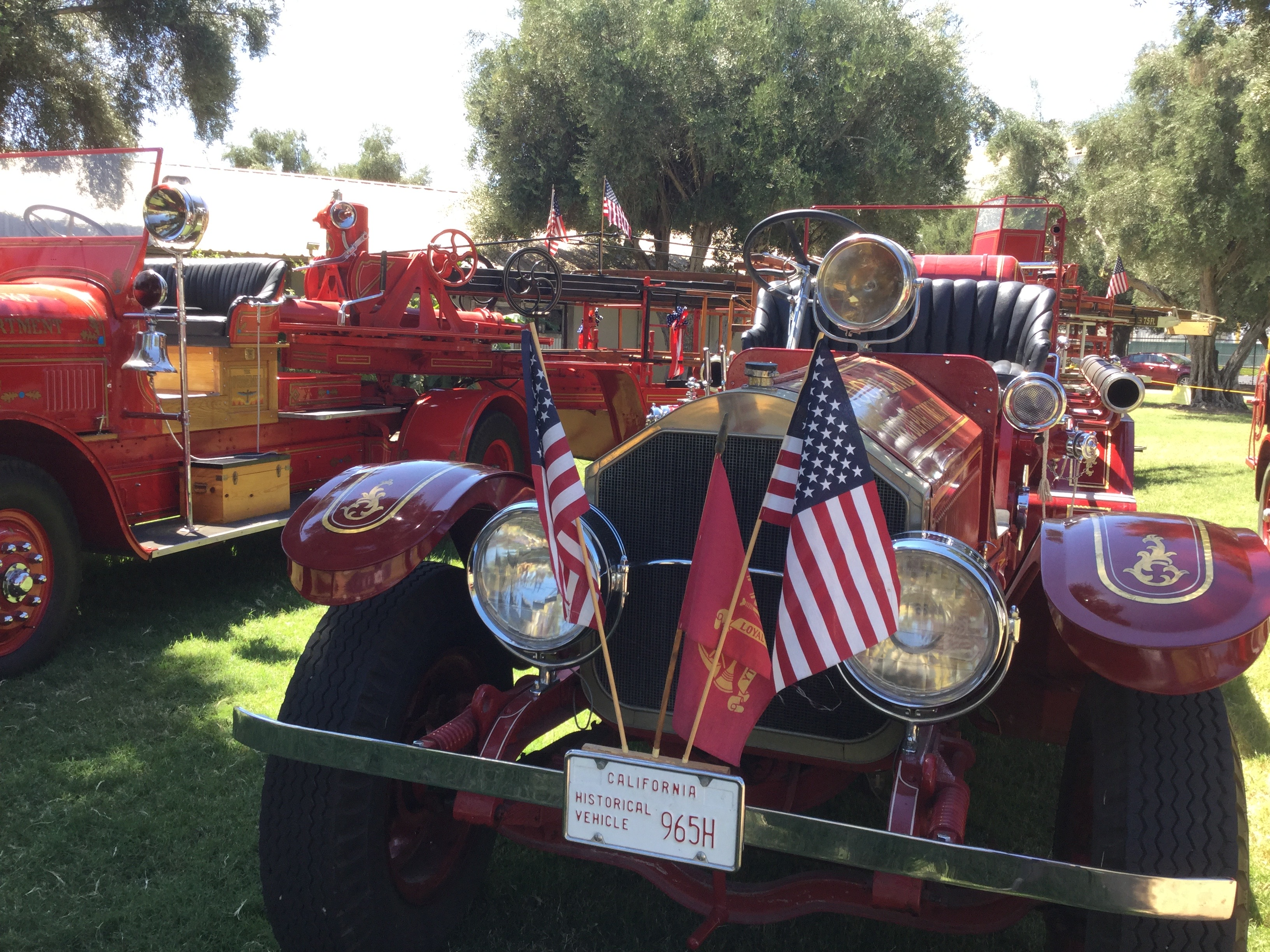
Vintage Woodland fire truck at the Yolo County Fair

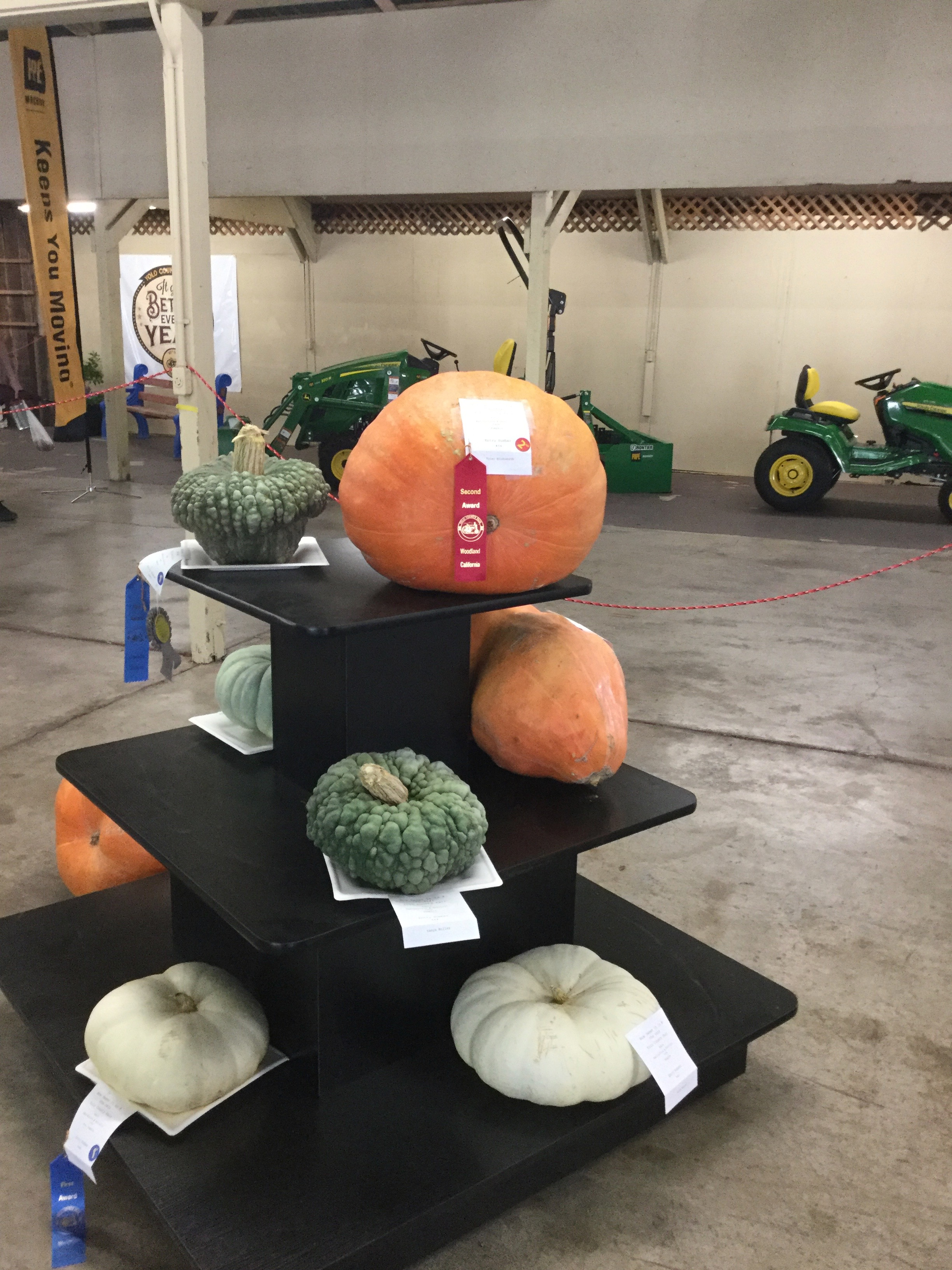
Pumpkins on exhibit at the Yolo County Fair

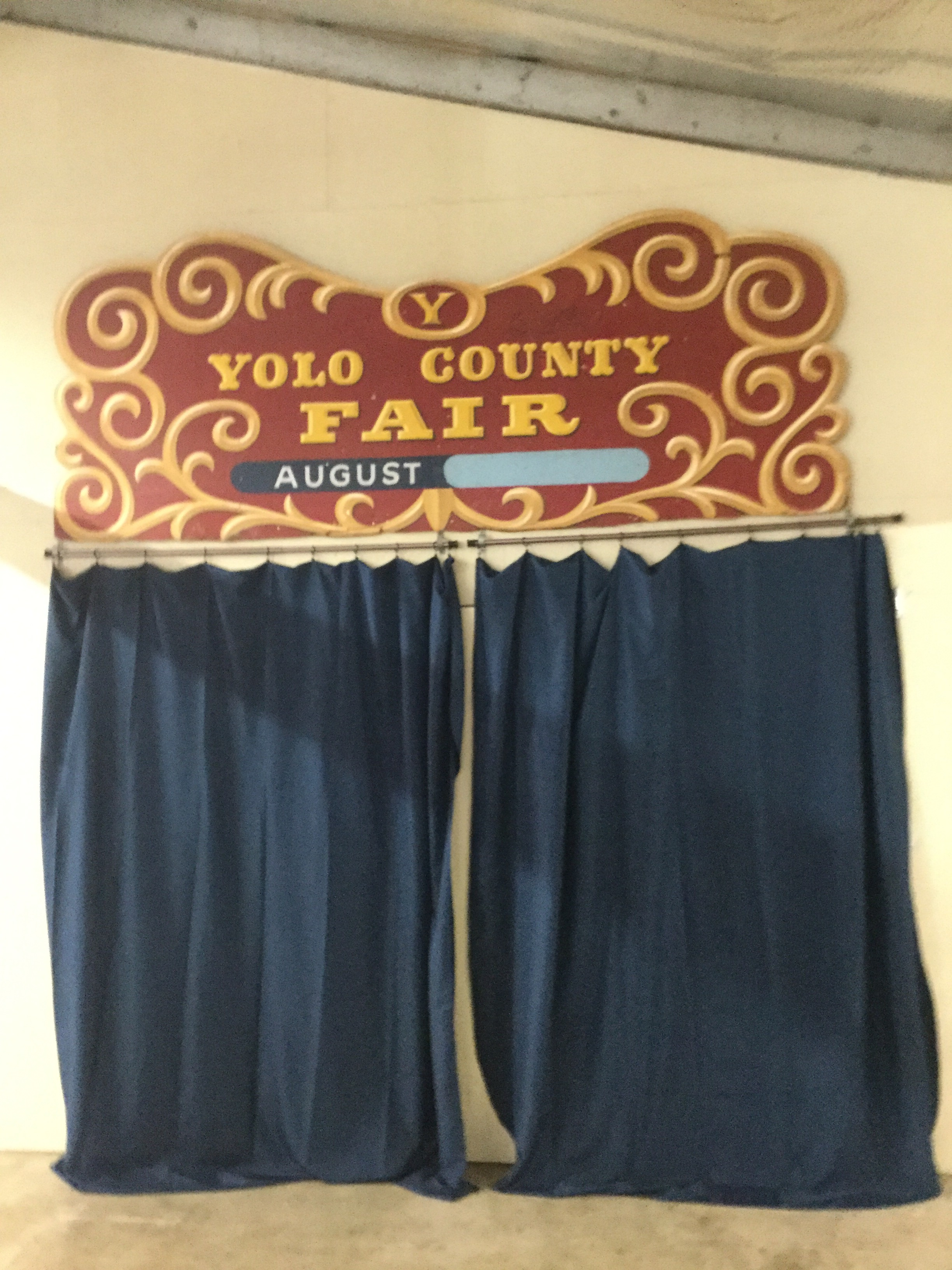
Ornate Yolo County Fair sign inside an exhibit hall

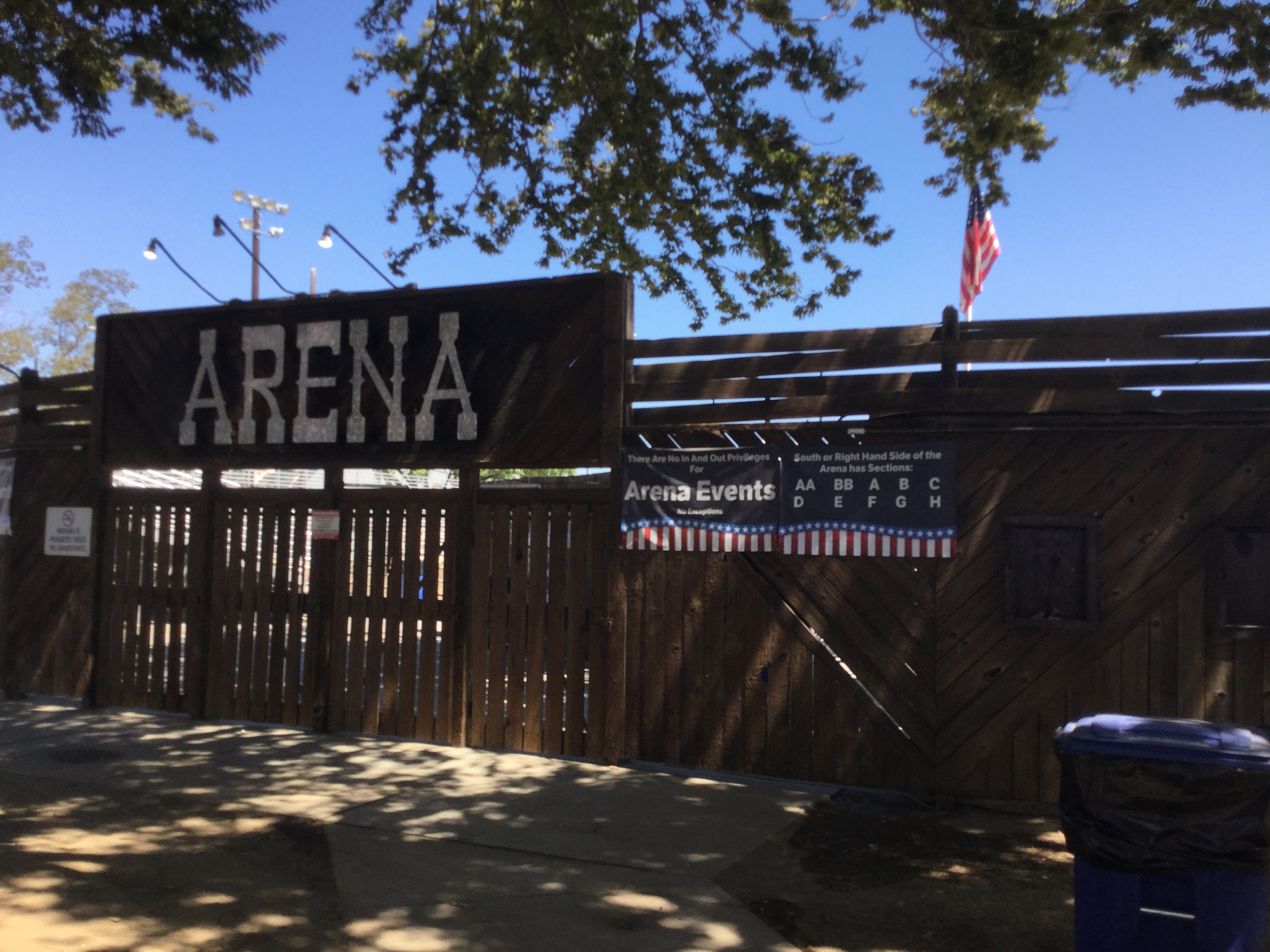
The gate to the arena at the Yolo County Fairgrounds

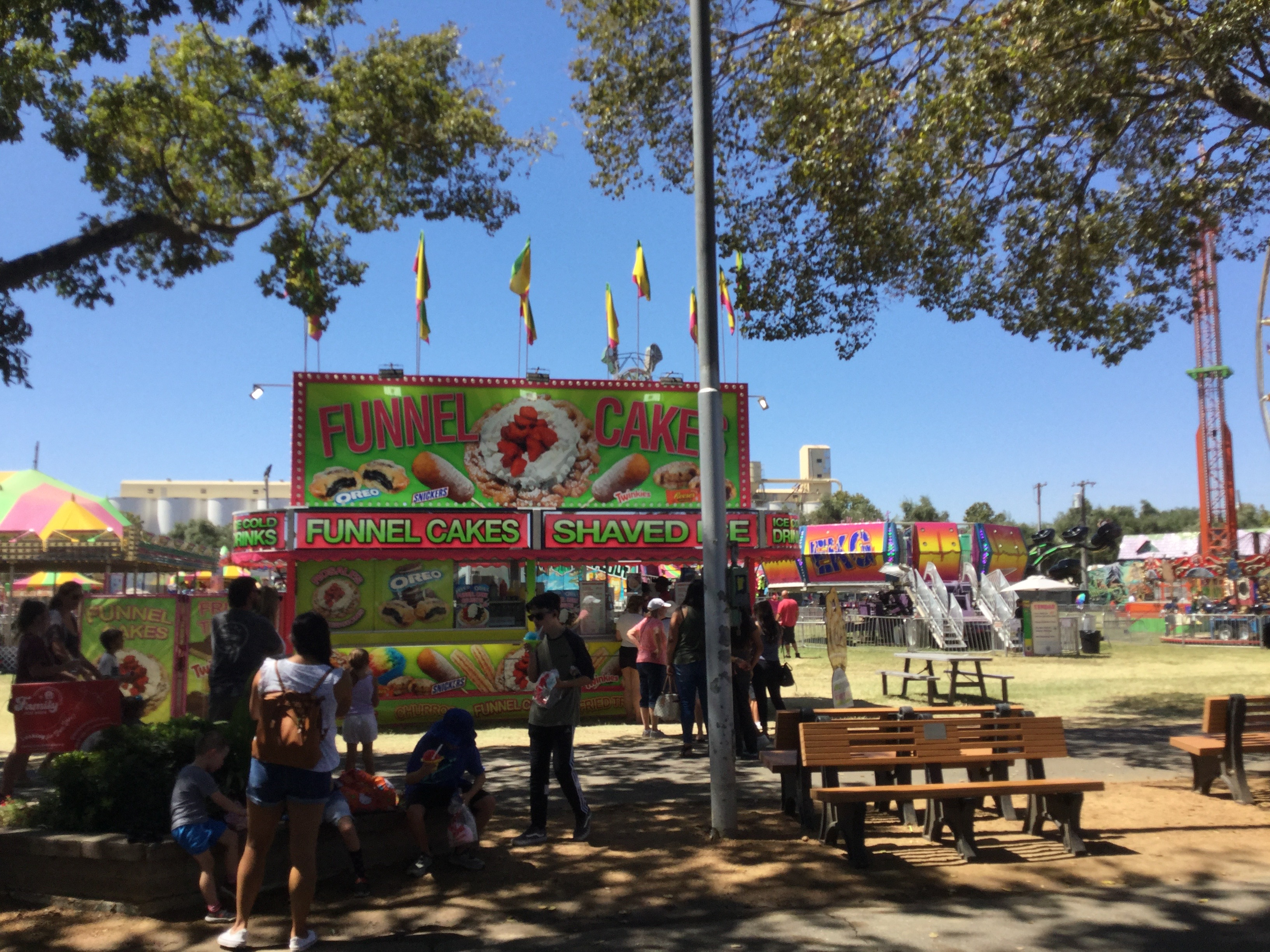
People line up for funnel cakes at the Yolo County Fair

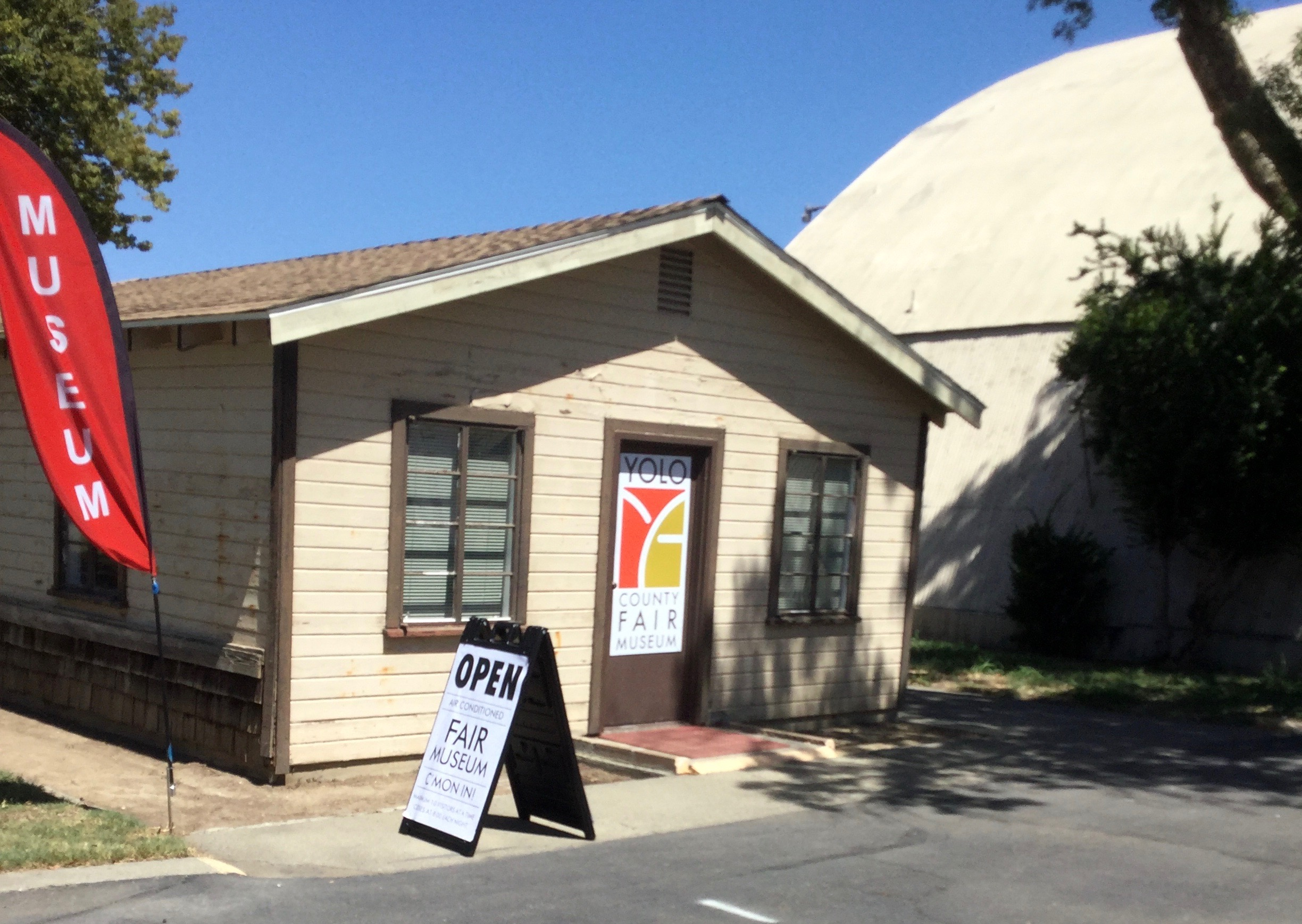
The Yolo County Fair Museum
