= May Dexter Henshall =

- Born: Mary Eliza Dexter; May 1, 1867; Woodland, California
- Died: July 30, 1962 (aged 95)
- Other names: Mary Dexter-Henshall
- Occupations: librarian and educator
- Notable work: California Library Hall of Fame inductee (2016)

May E. Dexter Henshall (May 1, 1867 – July 30, 1962) was an American educator, clubwoman, and library professional. She was inducted into the California Library Hall of Fame in 2016.

== Early life ==
Mary Eliza Dexter was born in Woodland, California, the youngest of four daughters of Thomas Jefferson Dexter and Elizabeth Hills Dexter. Her father moved from Illinois to California as a young man in the Gold Rush of 1849.

== Career ==
May E. Dexter taught school in Woodland as a young woman. She was appointed superintendent of schools in Yolo County in 1906, then elected to the position in 1906 and re-elected without opposition in 1910. In 1914 she lost her bid for a third elected term. As superintendent, she oversaw building projects, raised teacher salaries, lengthened the school year, and worked on expanding library services in Yolo County. In 1915, she brought that experience into her position as school library organizer at the California State Library. She traveled extensively, "from the orange groves of Riverside to the show and below zero weather of Inyo County in one night", visiting schools and libraries throughout rural California, working on building county free libraries. She also taught in the library school at the University of California, Berkeley. She retired in 1937. "A more conscientious official has never held public office in this county," declared Yolo County historian Thomas Jefferson Gregory.

Henshall spoke often at conferences and published papers in professional journals, and active on the national level in the American Library Association. She contributed a detailed chapter on the history of Yolo County schools for the county history published in 1913. She was a charter member and president of Yolo County's chapter of Native Daughters of the Golden West. In 1914 she served on a committee of Yolo women responsible for providing a restroom at the California Building of the Panama-Pacific International Exposition.

== Personal life ==
Mary Eliza Dexter married John Alfred Henshall, an English-born newspaper editor, in 1910. John Henshall died in 1938. May Dexter Henshall died in 1962, aged 95 years. In 2016, she was inducted into the California Library Hall of Fame.
