= Woodland Public Library =

- U.S. National Register of Historic Places
- U.S. Historic district – Contributing property
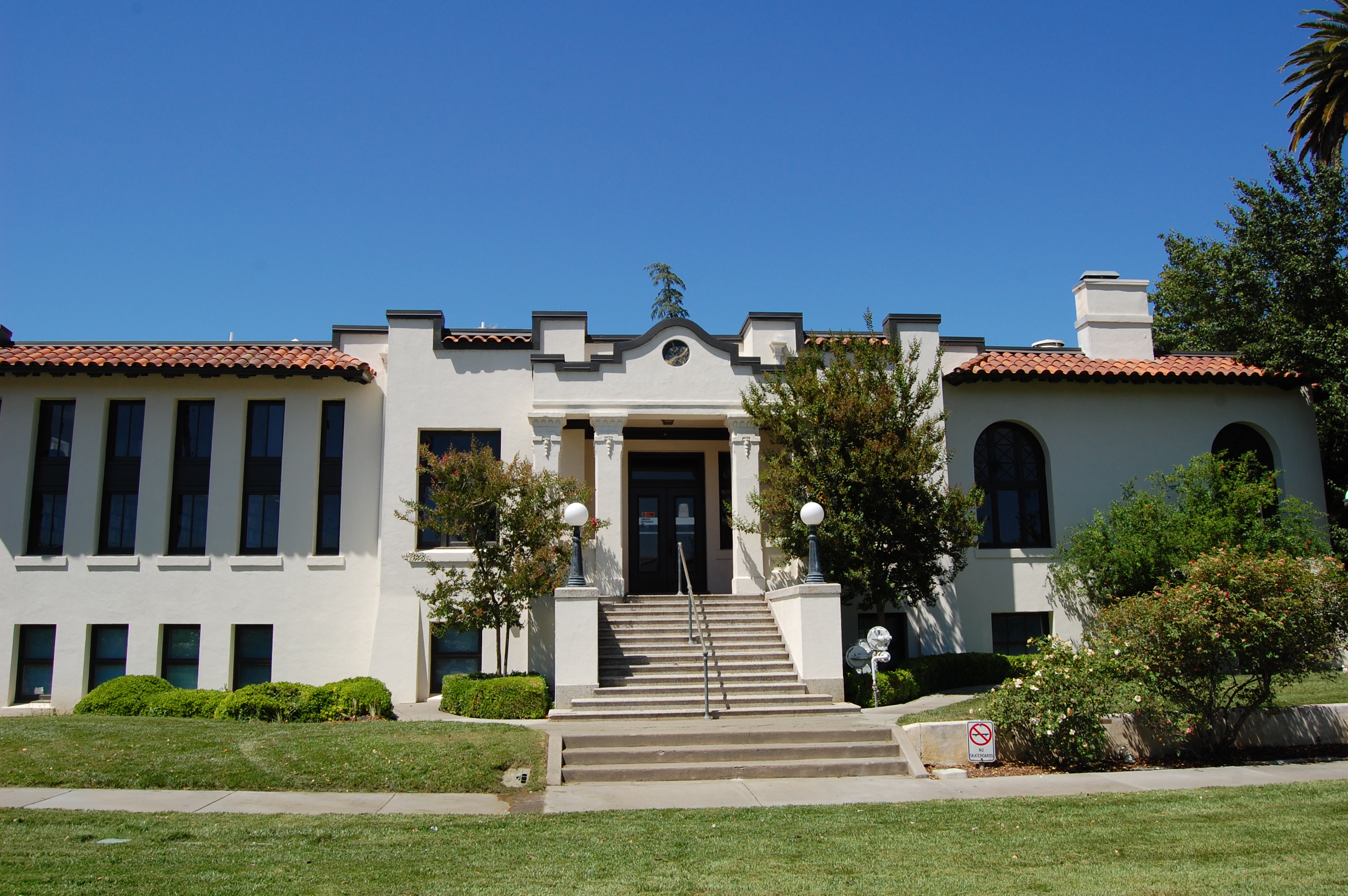

- Location within California Location within the United States
- Location: 250 1st St. Woodland, California
- Coordinates: 38°40′45″N 121°46′24″W
- Built: 1905
- Architect: Dodge & Dolliver, W.H. Weeks
- Architectural style: Mission Revival
- Part of: Downtown Woodland Historic District (ID99000471)
- NRHP reference No.: 81000183

Significant dates
- Added to NRHP: September 28, 1981
- Designated CP: June 22, 1999

The Woodland Public Library is the oldest, and one of the last functioning Carnegie-funded libraries in California. It is on the National Register of Historic Places and is a contributing property of the Downtown Woodland Historic District.

== History ==
Woodland's library history began with ice-cream socials and book donations from community members, led by the women in the community in 1874. In 1891 a $500 donation helped the community's efforts and led to the establishment of a free public library held in a small area in City Hall. In 1903 a grant from Andrew Carnegie was received in the amount of $10,000 for the construction of a public library. Dodge & Dolliver of San Francisco (whose work included the San Mateo County Courthouse and St. John's Presbyterian Church in San Francisco) was to design the first phase of the library. Dodge & Dolliver designed the building based on Mission Revival architecture even though James Bertram, Carnegie's personal secretary, objected to their choice. William Henry Curson, the contractor for the Woodland Opera House, was the contractor for the job.

Between 1915 and 1979 an agreement was made between the Yolo County Library System and the City Library. The two organizations shared the same building for administrative operations but the Yolo County Library had a separate service establishment. This led to Carnegie donating $12,000 in 1915 to expand the building. A west wing was added, designed by W.H. Weeks, with an entrance on Court Street with a sign that said "County Library" while the original entrance on First Street said "City Library".

In 1927-1929 another expansion occurred, and in 1985 voters approved a $2.5 million expansion that included the construction of the Leake Room and the interior courtyard. When the additions were completed in 1988, the building was twice as large.

== See also ==
- National Register of Historic Places listings in Yolo County, California
