= Union Church of Dunnigan =

Historic church in California, United States

- U.S. National Register of Historic Places
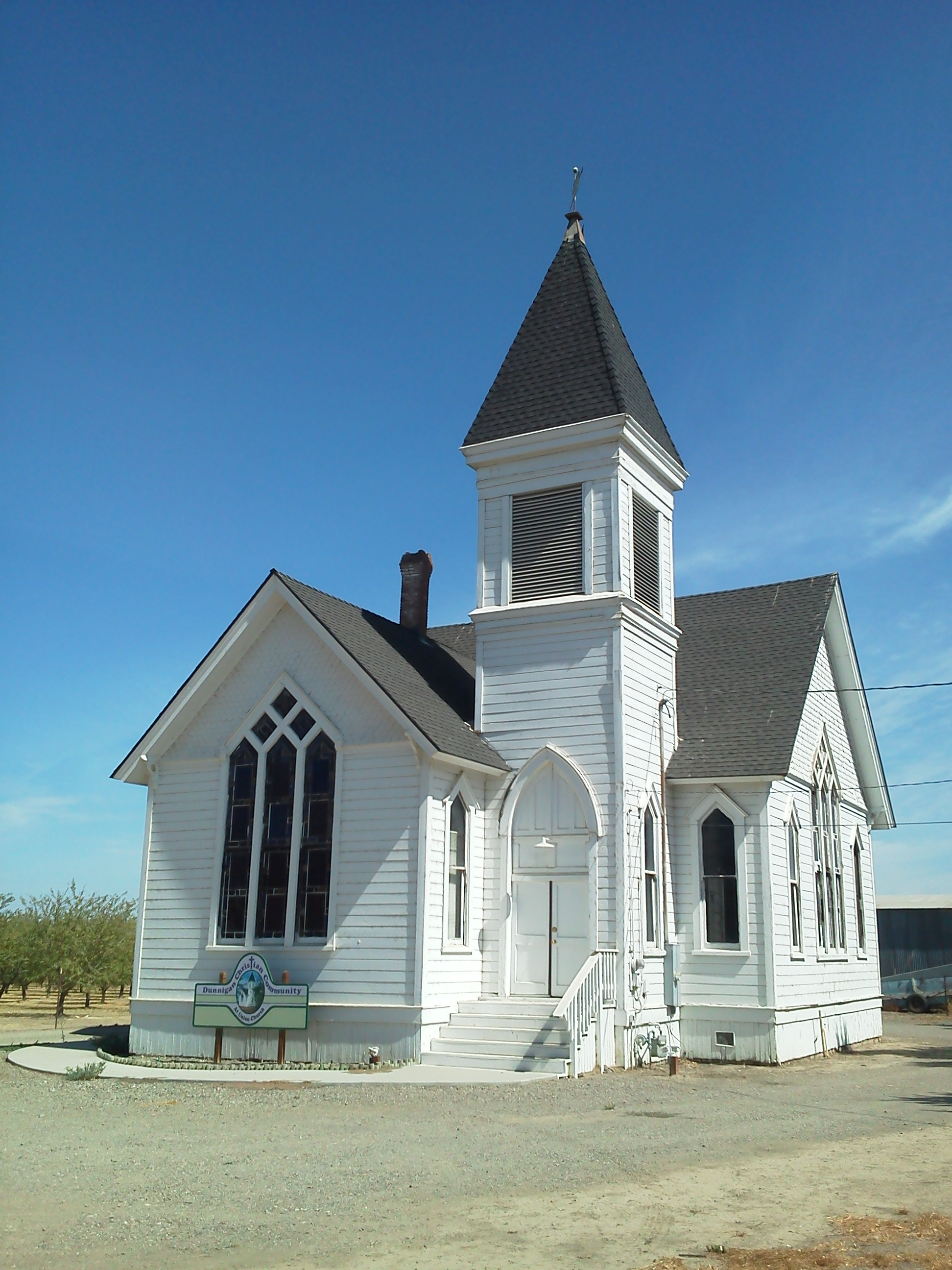

- Location within California Location within the United States
- Location: 3615 County Road 89A, Dunnigan, California
- Coordinates: 38°53′11″N 121°58′2″W
- Area: less than one acre
- Built: 1892
- Architect: Gruing Bros.; et al.
- Architectural style: Gothic Revival
- NRHP reference No.: 03000613
- Added to NRHP: July 10, 2003

Union Church of Dunnigan (also known as Dunnigan Community Church) is a historic church located at 3615 County Road 89A in Dunnigan, California. The Gothic Revival church construction began in 1892, and was completed in 1894. Its design features pointed arch windows and doorways and a louvered bell tower with a working bell. As a union church, the church was not connected to any specific denomination and was instead used for all community religious functions. In addition to services for the community's various congregations, the church hosted visiting preachers, weddings, funerals, baptisms, and a yearly Christmas bazaar during the 1960s and 1970s.

The church was added to the National Register of Historic Places in 2003.
