= Hotel Woodland =

- U.S. National Register of Historic Places
- U.S. Historic district – Contributing property
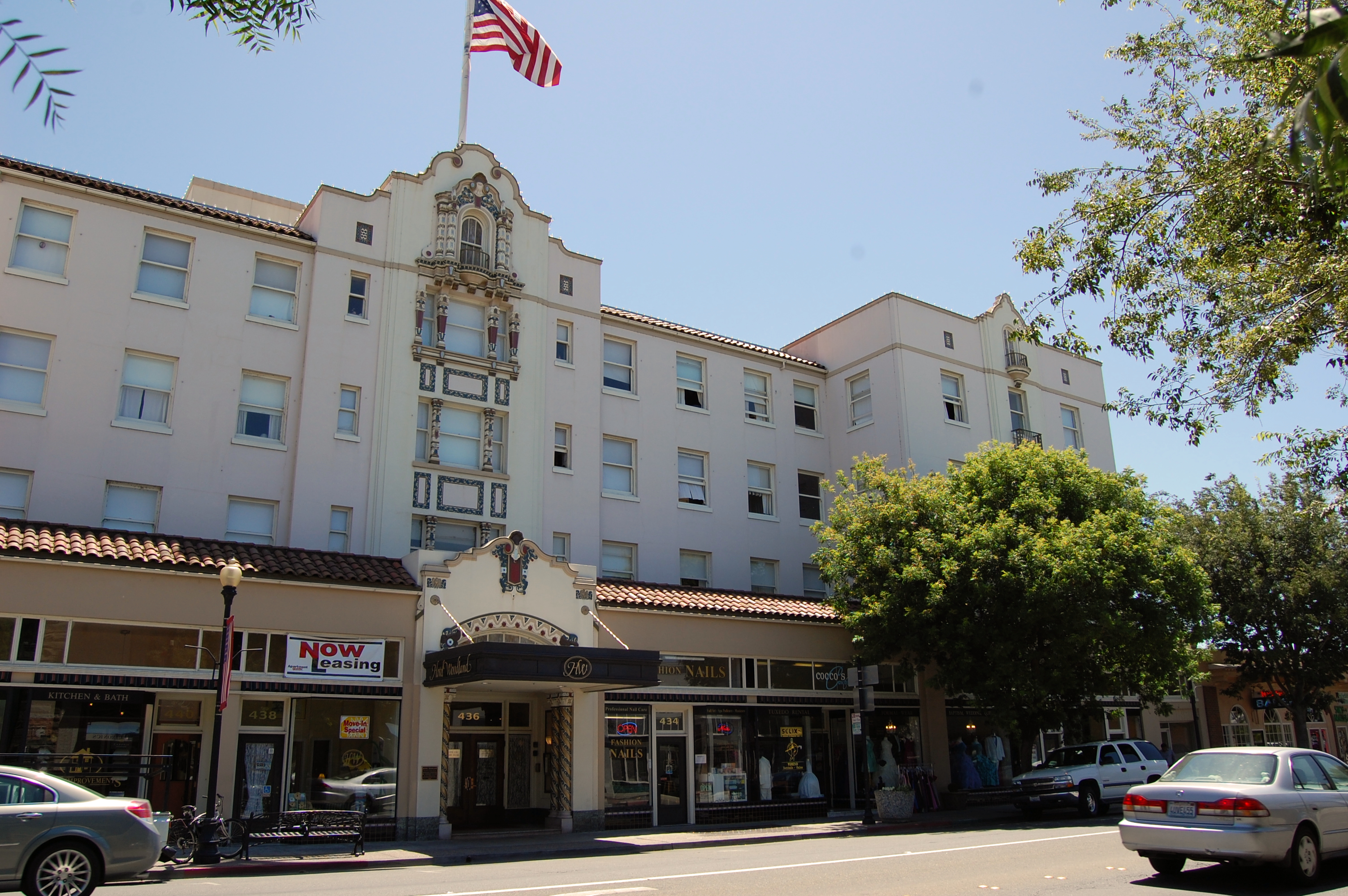
- Hotel Woodland as it appears in 2011.

- Location within California Location within the United States
- Location: 426 Main St., Woodland, California
- Coordinates: 38°40′38.06″N 121°46′30.42″W
- Architect: Weeks, W. H.
- Architectural style: California Churrigueresque (Spanish Colonial Revival)
- Part of: Downtown Woodland Historic District (ID99000471)
- NRHP reference No.: 94001225

Significant dates
- Added to NRHP: October 21, 1994
- Designated CP: June 22, 1999

Hotel Woodland is a historic hotel located in Woodland, California and designed by William Henry Weeks. The hotel is on the National Register of Historic Places, and is a contributing property of the Downtown Woodland Historic District.

== History ==
In 1920 the idea of an upscale hotel in Woodland was discussed by a group of local businessmen, who then formed an investment group that offered stock ownership for this idea. This group approached W.H. Weeks with their preliminary plans after enough funds were raised to make the project seem possible.

The plans weren't carried out until 1928, however. At this point in Woodland's history, there were many tourists and visitors to the city, and this prosperity prompted the plans years earlier for an upscale hotel, to come to fruition. The hotel was developed by Weeks' Securities Corporation, a corporation Weeks had just started the same year, which had developed several other hotels in northern California. Around 50 local businesses also invested in the hotel, raising 10% of the $500,000 spent to construct the building. A site on the corner of Main and College Street was chosen, where just ten years earlier a hotel by the name of Byrns Hotel had been condemned and demolished. Hotel Woodland was thus made real. In the 25 years since his first project in Woodland, this would be Weeks' 14th project and last major work in the city.

The hotel was completed with four stories, 80 guest rooms, and was built reflecting a simplified California Churrigueresque style of Spanish Colonial Revival architecture. The Spanish Colonial Revival style of the building shows a simplified commercial version, but has more detailed Churrigueresque features like the "festively painted" moldings that are grouped together in the upper window of the central tower of the building. The building also shows off a clay tile roof and decorated spiral columns near the entryway. The building's lobby features 2,000 square feet (190 m^{2}) of cement floor, meant to appear like Mexican tile, wrought iron chandeliers and "beamed, stenciled ceilings". The ground floor also had a restaurant and a banquet room for social events.

Its elegance made it a spot for important community events and gatherings. Because of its visibility on Main Street, as well as its beauty, it was one of the buildings that contributed to the splendor of Downtown Woodland.

By the 1980s, the hotel had become dilapidated and worn. Main Street merchants and city residents all agreed that something had to be done to the building, either to demolish it or to renovate it. After much discussion over several years, the path of renovation for the hotel was chosen. Near the end of 1994 a non-profit organization and a local developer purchased the hotel for $925,000. They made $5.5 million in subsequent renovations to make the hotel livable. The hotel was converted into a place for low-income residents. The renovations were funded from local, state, and federal grants. The upper floors were planned for housing while the bottom floors were projected to have shops.
