= Yolo County Courthouse =

- U.S. National Register of Historic Places
- U.S. Historic district – Contributing property
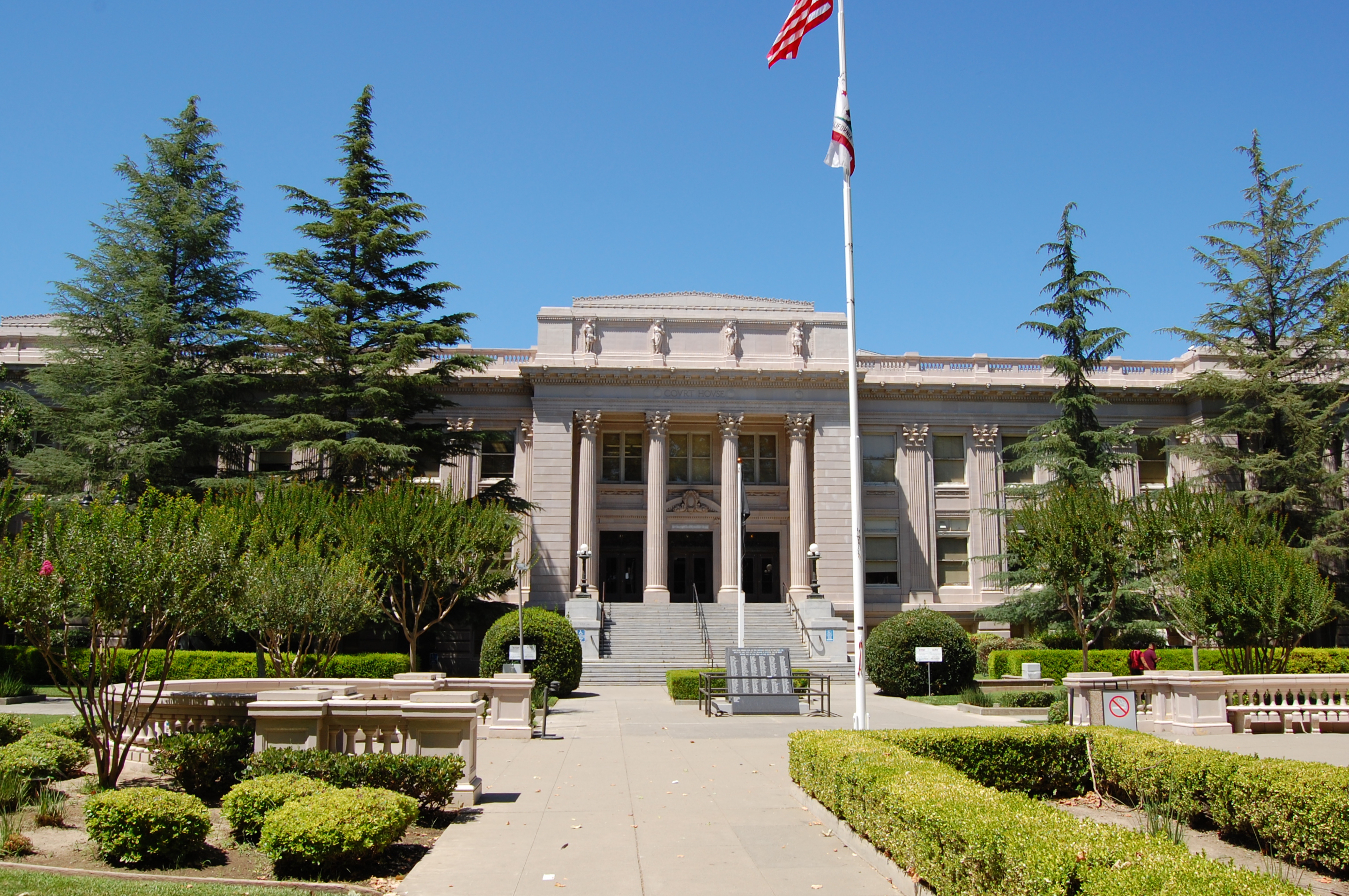
- The Yolo County Courthouse as it appeared in 2011.

- Location within California Location within the United States
- Location: 725 Court St., Woodland, California
- Coordinates: 38.67945°N 121.77125°W
- Built: 1917
- Architect: William Henry Weeks
- Architectural style: Beaux Arts, Spanish Revival
- Part of: Downtown Woodland Historic District (ID99000471)
- NRHP reference No.: 86003660
- Added to NRHP: February 26, 1987

The Yolo County Courthouse was a courthouse for the Superior Court of California in Yolo County in Woodland, California until 2015. The original building was erected in 1864, and was used for 37 years until condemned in 1911. The edifice, built in the same location in 1917, was listed on the National Register of Historic Places in 1987, and is also a contributing property in the Downtown Woodland Historic District.

== History ==
The land for the first courthouse was offered to the county supervisors by Frank Freeman, one of Woodland's founders. He offered an entire city block with the boundaries of Court, North, Second, and Third Streets. Albert Bennett, an architect from Sacramento, who also worked among other architects on the California State Capitol building, was hired by the Yolo County Board of Supervisors to design one of the city's first major landmarks. A builder named P. McManus was chosen for the construction and was hired on June 26, 1863, for $24,250, and was to have it built by October 1, 1864. The final result was a two-story brick Italianate style edifice, $27,858 in the making. Not only was the dollar amount more than what was expected, but the construction also took longer than planned. Subsequent earthquakes in 1892, 1904, and 1906 weakened the structural integrity of the building and damaged the ventilation system. In 1908 one judge moved his court out of the building due to odor in the building. The Yolo County Grand Jury, Board of Supervisors, and the California State Board of Health found the building "unsanitary and unfit for the transactions of the court" on January 4, 1911.

On October 17, 1911 the supervisors held a county-wide election to approve a $300,000 bond measure that would pay for the new courthouse to be built. The measure lacked the consensus needed, and it was put up again in the next election on December 28, 1911, failing another time. In the meantime, the court moved its offices.

In 1916 the Board of Supervisors placed another measure on the ballot for $200,000. The citizens passed the measure and the old courthouse was demolished to make room for the construction of a new building. A ceremony was held with a crowd of 3,000, and the Grand Lodge of Masons of California laid the cornerstone of the new courthouse. All businesses and schools were closed for the celebration.

William Henry Weeks, who completed several works in Woodland including the Woodland Public Library, was the architect and Robert Trost, from San Francisco, was the contractor. It is an example of the Beaux-Arts architecture style. The building was completed in 1917 and the price totaled $300,000.

The courthouse was extensively remodeled on the interior during the 1980s and placed on the National Register of Historic Places near the end of 1986. The courthouse originally held other county administrative offices, but as the courts have grown, those have been relocated. As of today, the interior has undergone new construction without compromising the historical features. It is now the new home of the Yolo County Probation Department.

== Architecture ==
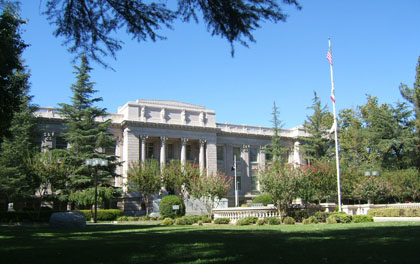

The new building's architecture displays influences of Greek, Roman, and Renaissance architecture. It features two full stories, as well as an attic and a basement. The concrete exterior was made of Colusa sandstone, and the cornices were made with material from a terra cotta factory in Lincoln, California. When Weeks showed visitors around the new courthouse he was quoted as saying, "This courthouse is the most beautiful in California, and I have built and rebuilt many of them and have seen them all..."

On the inside, the courthouse has a rotunda on both the second and third floors with a main corridor spanning the length of the building. Each rotunda is made of marble pilaster columns with decorative murals in niches located near them. Both the rotundas and corridors are made from cut and polished marble with decorative copper handrails and hand-blown, egg-shaped glass light fixtures.
