= Woodland, California =

City in California, United States

- City
- City of Woodland
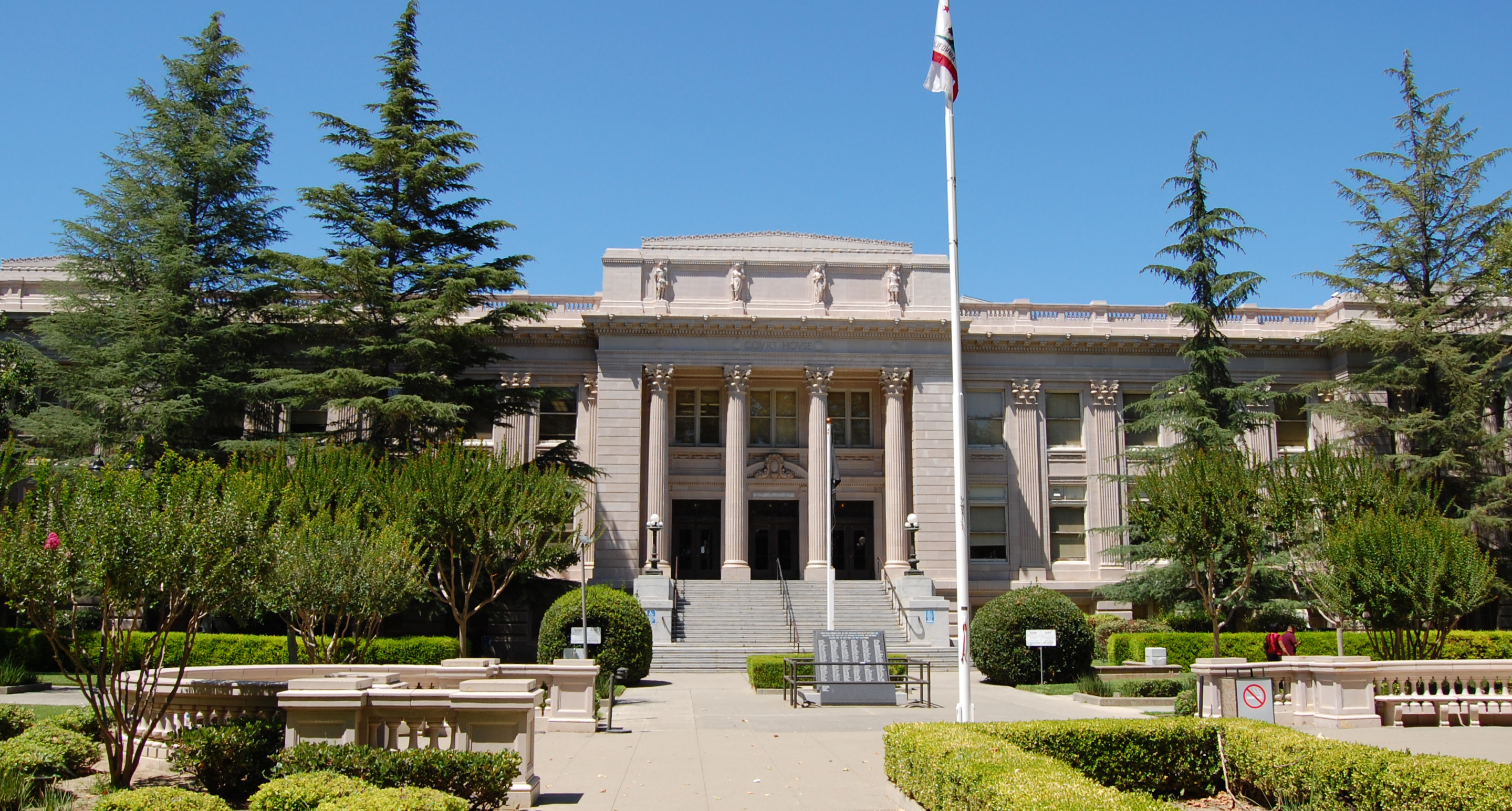
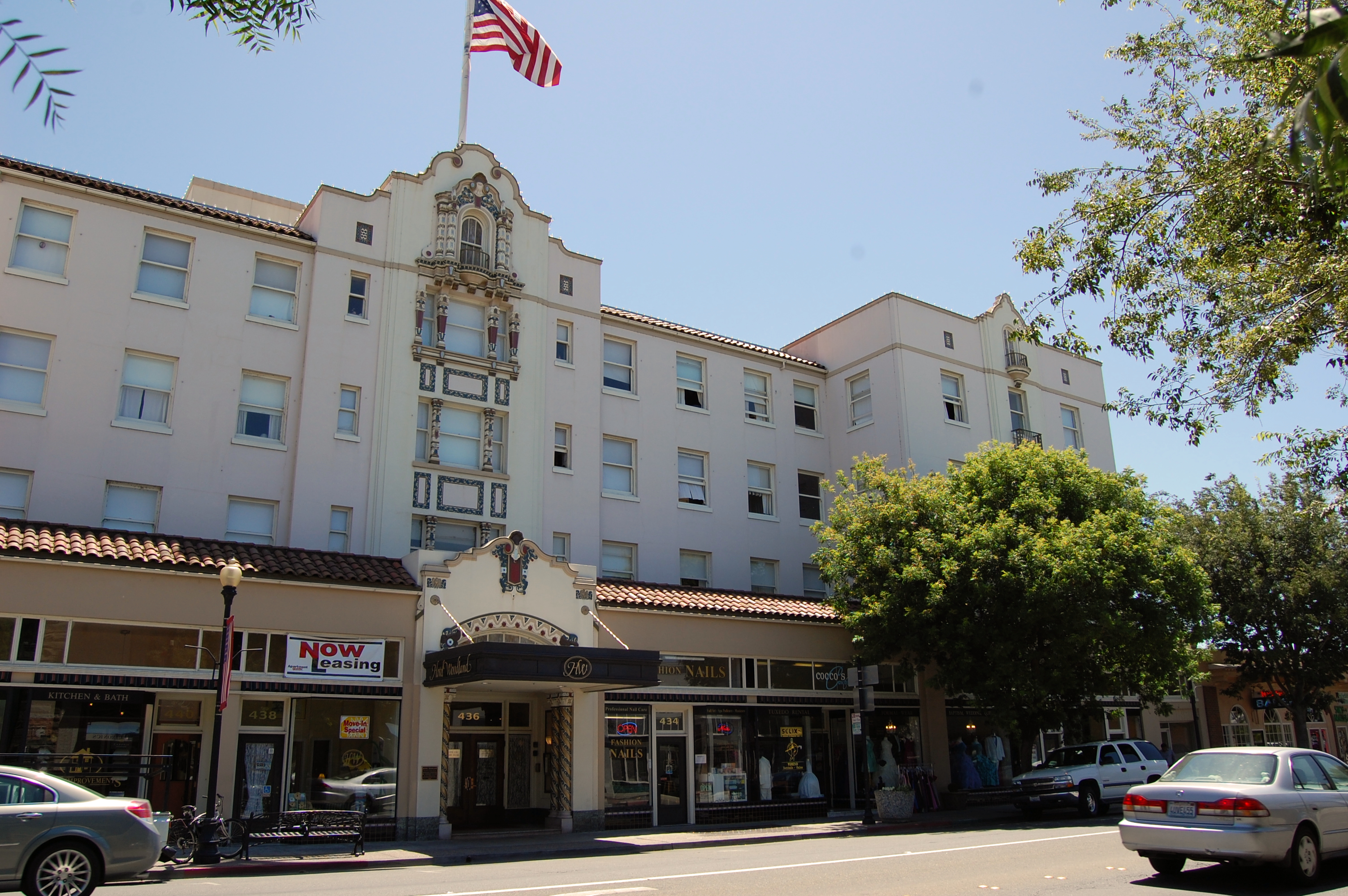
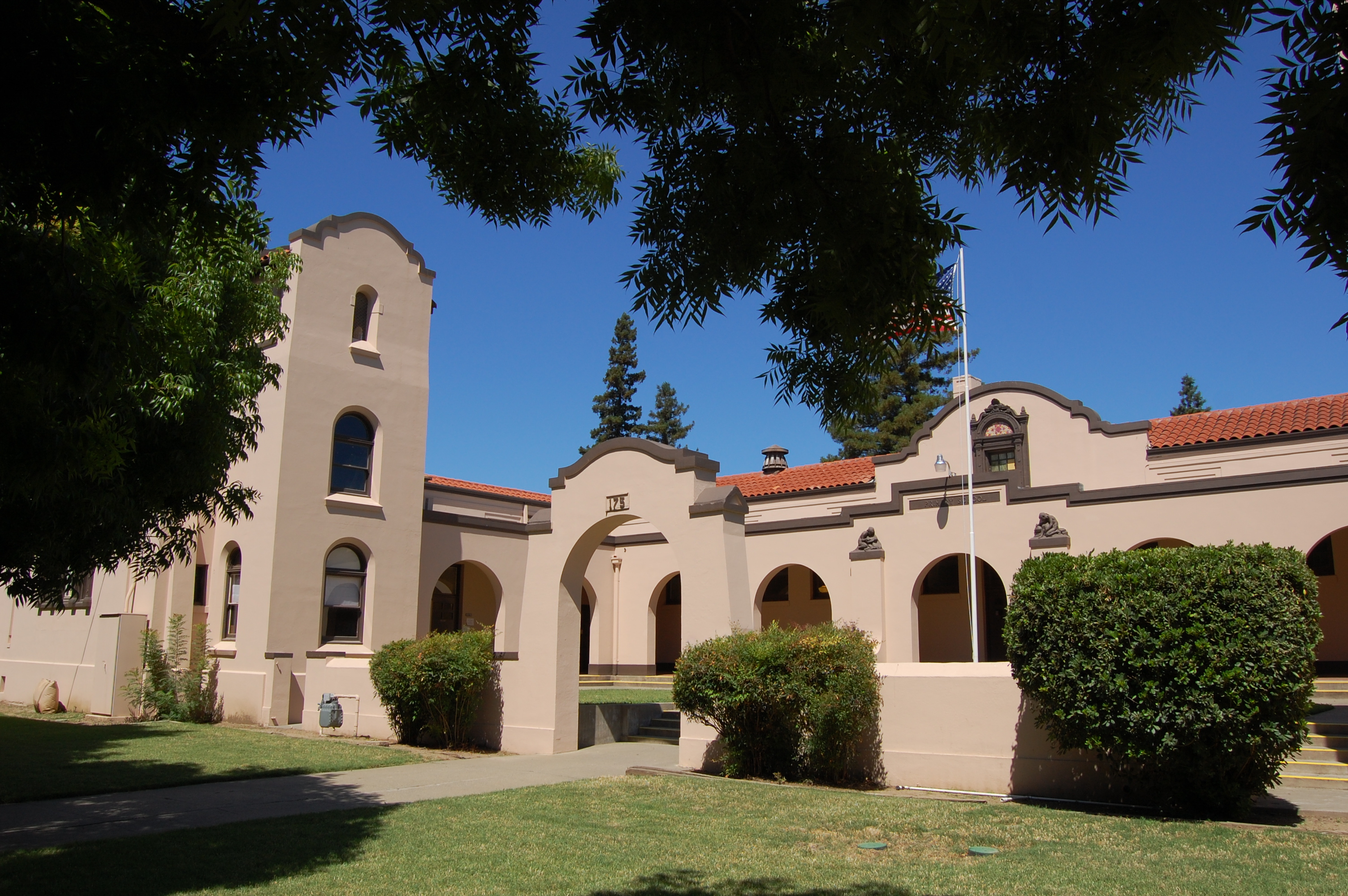
- Clockwise: Yolo County Courthouse; Walnut Street School; Hotel Woodland

- Flag
- Nickname: City of Trees
- Interactive map of Woodland, California
- Location in the State of California Location in the contiguous United States
- Coordinates: 38°40′43″N 121°46′24″W
- Country: United States
- State: California
- County: Yolo
- Incorporated: February 22, 1871

Government
  - Mayor: Tom Stallard
  - Mayor Pro Tempore: Mayra Vega
  - State senator: Christopher Cabaldon (D)
  - Assemblymember: Cecilia Aguiar-Curry (D)
  - U. S. rep.: Mike Thompson (D)

Area
  - Total: 15.32 sq mi (39.67 km^{2})
  - Land: 15.32 sq mi (39.67 km^{2})
  - Water: 0 sq mi (0.00 km^{2}) 0%
- Elevation: 69 ft (21 m)

Population (2020)
  - Total: 61,032
  - Density: 3,985/sq mi (1,538/km^{2})
- Time zone: UTC-8 (Pacific)
  - Summer (DST): UTC-7 (PDT)
- ZIP codes: 95695, 95776
- Area code: 530, 837
- FIPS code: 06-86328
- GNIS feature IDs: 1652659, 2412300
- Website: www.cityofwoodland.gov

Woodland is a city in and the county seat of Yolo County, California, United States. Located approximately 15 miles (24 km) northwest of Sacramento, it is a part of the Sacramento metropolitan area.

As of the 2020 census, Woodland had a population of 61,032.

Woodland's origins date to 1850 when California gained statehood and Yolo County was established. The area was well irrigated due to the efforts of James Moore, which drew people into farming as the soil was very fertile. The city gained a federal post office in 1861 with the help of Missourian Frank S. Freeman. A year after this, in 1862, the county seat was moved from Washington (present day West Sacramento) to Woodland after Washington was flooded. The addition of a railroad line to Sacramento, and the more recent addition of Interstate 5, helped the city to thrive.

== History ==
=== Indigenous culture ===
Before its settlement by people of European descent, the Woodland area was inhabited by the Patwin, a subgroup of the Wintun Native Americans, further divided into the River and Coastal Patwin. Woodland's indigenous roots stem from the River Patwin, who tended to stay closer to the Sacramento River, as opposed to the Coastal Patwin who lived in small valleys in hills and ranges. The Yolotoi, a tribelet of the Patwin, occupied area near Woodland, and settled a village northwest of Woodland, as well as area close to present-day Knights Landing. Although they did not have a permanent settlement in present-day Woodland, it is believed that the River Patwin occupied the Woodland area in seasonal camps for hunting and seed gathering. The Yolotoi and their neighboring tribelets had a main trading trail which followed Cache Creek. The exchange of goods between the neighboring tribes of the Nomlaki to the north, the Nisenan to the east, and the Pomo to the west also served as a way of cultural and social interchange between all the tribes. The simultaneous enslavement and spread of disease through the Patwin by the Spanish missionaries quickly had dramatic effects; a malarial epidemic in 1830–33 and a smallpox epidemic in 1837 killed much of the surviving natives. However, some of the first farm hands in the earliest farms in Woodland were Patwin.

=== Beginnings ===
In 1851, the year after California became a state and Yolo County was formed, "Uncle Johnny" Morris settled at what is now the corner of First and Clover Streets in Woodland. Two years later Henry Wyckoff arrived and built a store he named "Yolo City". The new Yolo City might have stayed a singular store if Frank S. Freeman, the man responsible for the establishment of the post office, had not bought it and acquired 160 acres (0.65 km^{2}) of land in 1857. Freeman began to develop a town that he hoped would be a trading center for one of the richest crop-growing areas in America. He gave land to anyone who would clear it and build a home. In 1859, Freeman suggested that the town be called Woodland, which the post office accepted. On July 5, 1861, the Woodland Post Office was established and Freeman became Postmaster. He lost no time in developing the town by leasing or selling commercial buildings.

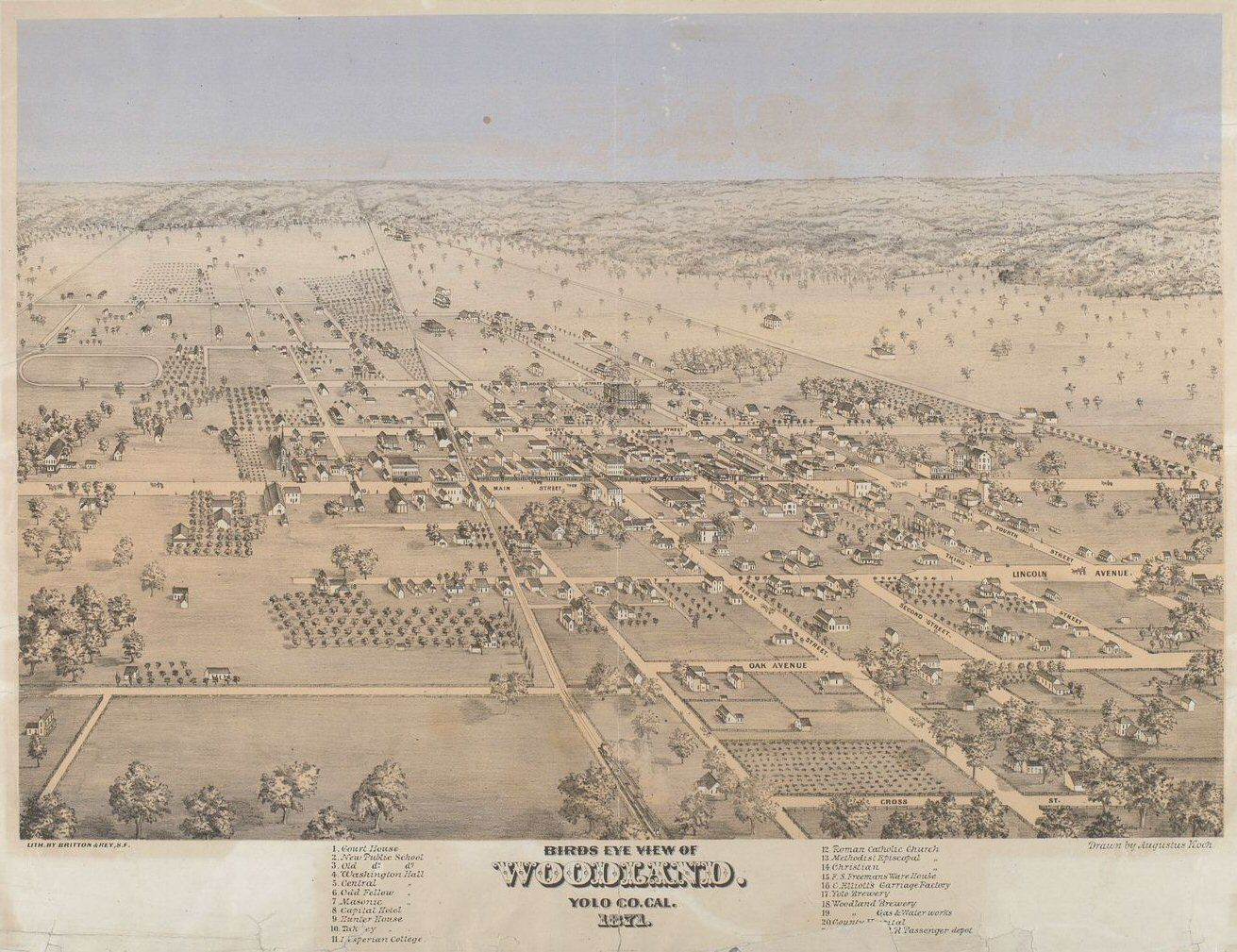
Bird's-eye view of Woodland c. 1871

The 1860s were a time of opportunity. The county seat was permanently moved to Woodland after Washington, California (now a part of West Sacramento) flooded. Schools, homes, churches, and a cemetery were built. The town's newspaper, the Daily Democrat and a rail line was built. In 1869, the California Pacific Railroad Company constructed a line between Davisville (now Davis) and Marysville with a Woodland station in the area of College Street and Lincoln Avenue. The rail line expanded and was eventually acquired by Southern Pacific Railroad. The track was then relocated from College Street to East Street, the eastern edge of the city at that point. The addition of the railroad led to the expansion of Woodland. Before the railroad came, people were building primarily from Main Street northward. Later expansion headed west and south.

In 1870 the population of Woodland was estimated to be 1,600 people, 647 of whom were registered voters. Signatures were collected to petition for the incorporation of the town. The City of Woodland was incorporated in 1871 and its residents soon had regular train and telegraph operations, telephone services, gas, water, electricity, street lights, and graveled streets. Byron Jackson, inventor of the centrifugal pump, opened a machine shop in Woodland in 1872. The business moved to San Francisco in 1879, supplying highly efficient pumps for ground water irrigation which transformed agriculture and industry in California. Established by Sarah Huston in 1891, initially, The Home Alliance newspaper was the only publication in the state that fought the legalized liquor traffic.

=== 20th century ===
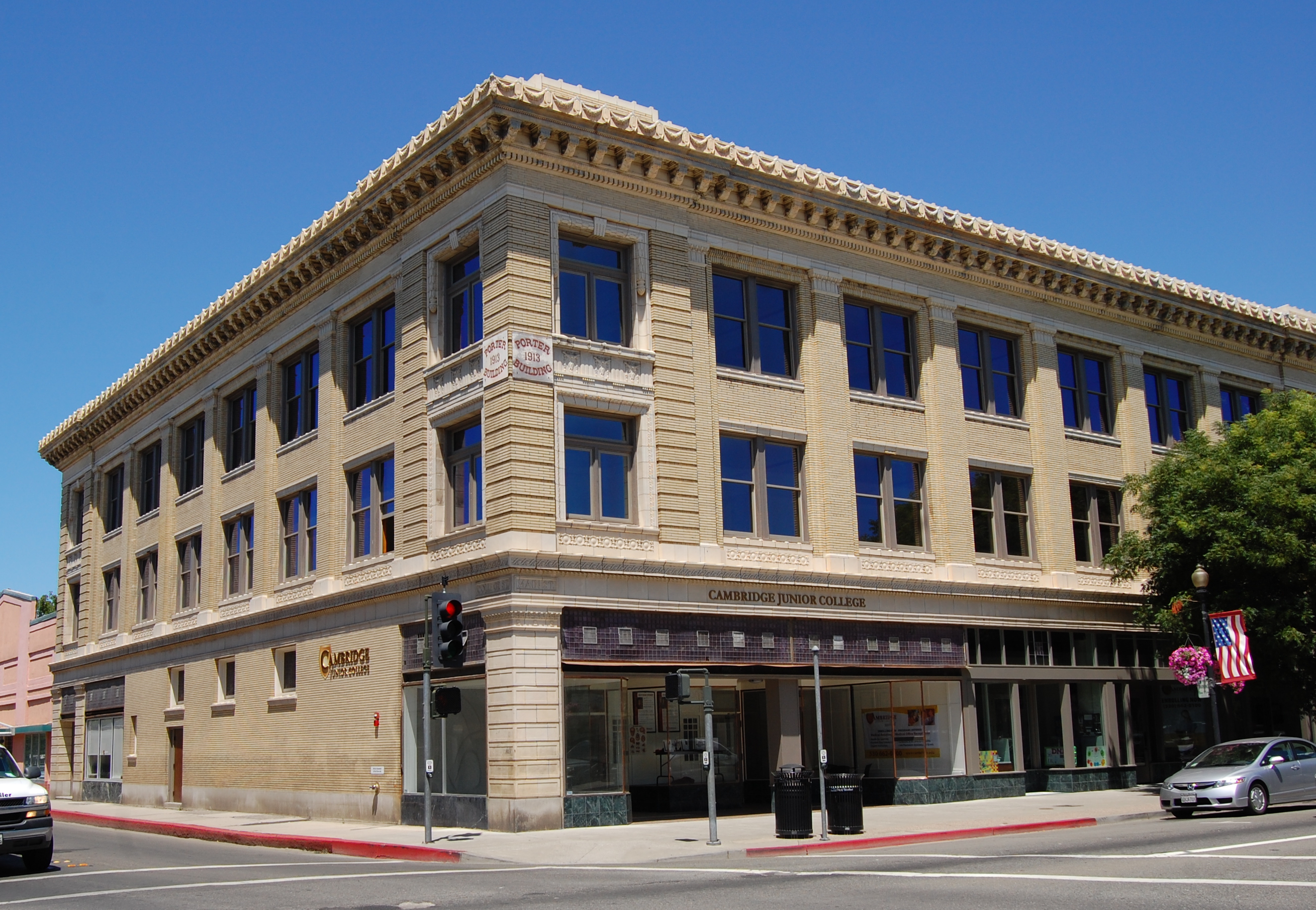
Historic Porter Building

Woodland's Chamber of Commerce was founded in 1900. During this time public activism helped Woodland get a library, a city park, and an improved cemetery. In 1910 Woodland was the most populous city in the county, with a population of 3,187. For the next forty years Woodland grew slowly but steadily, based on agriculture-related businesses: three rice mills, a sugar beet refinery, and a tomato cannery were built.

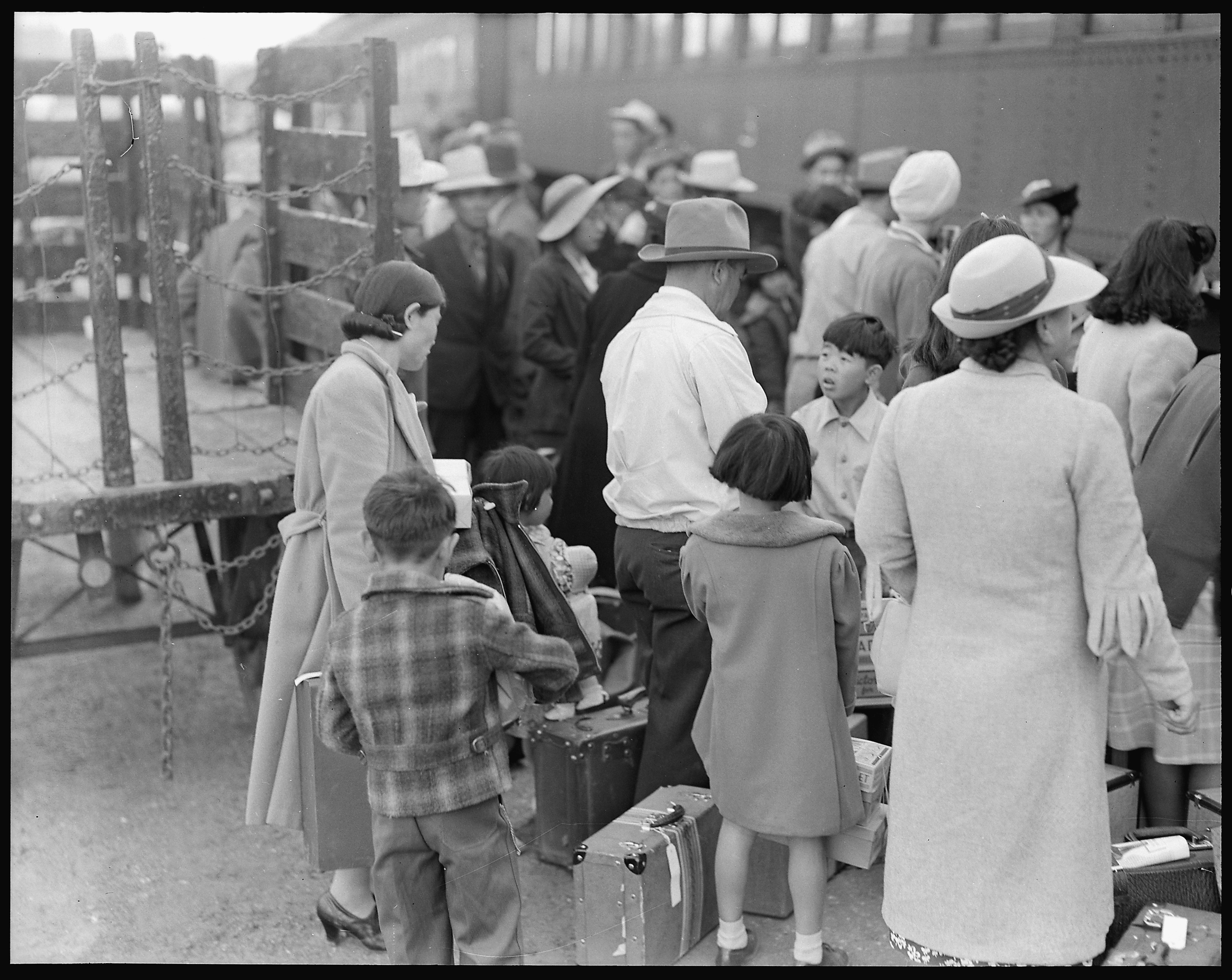
Families of Japanese ancestry being removed from Woodland, California, during World War II

After President Roosevelt issued Executive Order 9066, which authorized military commanders to exclude "any or all persons" from certain areas in the name of national defense, the Western Defense Command began ordering Japanese Americans living on the West Coast to "evacuate" from the newly created military zones. This included many Woodland farming families. At Woodland, was a Woodland Civil Control Station, for check-in, with no overnight accommodations.

The post-war era spurred growth in Woodland; between 1950 and 1980, Woodland's population tripled. In the 1950s Woodland had the most millionaires per capita of any city in California. Industrial plants and distribution centers grew in the northeast, with new subdivisions and shopping centers around the town. Since the late 1960s, there has been greater interest in preserving the town's historic buildings, and many have been restored as homes, offices, stores and museums. Woodland's "Stroll Through History," an annual event, began in 1989 to showcase many of the Victorian homes and other historical sites throughout the city.

In the 1970s Interstate 5 was completed, curving around Woodland, with a business routing along Main Street and Road 98. Over time, I-5 and State Route 113 replaced the railroads as major transportation arteries.

=== 21st century ===
Woodland has continued to grow in the early 21st century, with many additions to the community. Subdivisions have been built (mainly on the east side of town) and several major chain stores opened. This economic growth has encouraged more people to invest in the community and continue its expansion. In 2023, City Manager Ken Hiatt stated an estimate of 161.5 million dollars in public and private investments were to be directed to the city for further development. Woodland has even been named as one of the top 100 places to live in America, ranking at number 55.

Pioneer High School opened for the 2003–04 school year.

In 2018, thanks in part to the establishment of the new community near Pioneer High School, Spring Lake Elementary was created. This makes eleven elementary school in Woodland alone.

Main Street has revived with new restaurants, a new court house, and the expansion of the Old State Theater into a 10-screen multiplex.

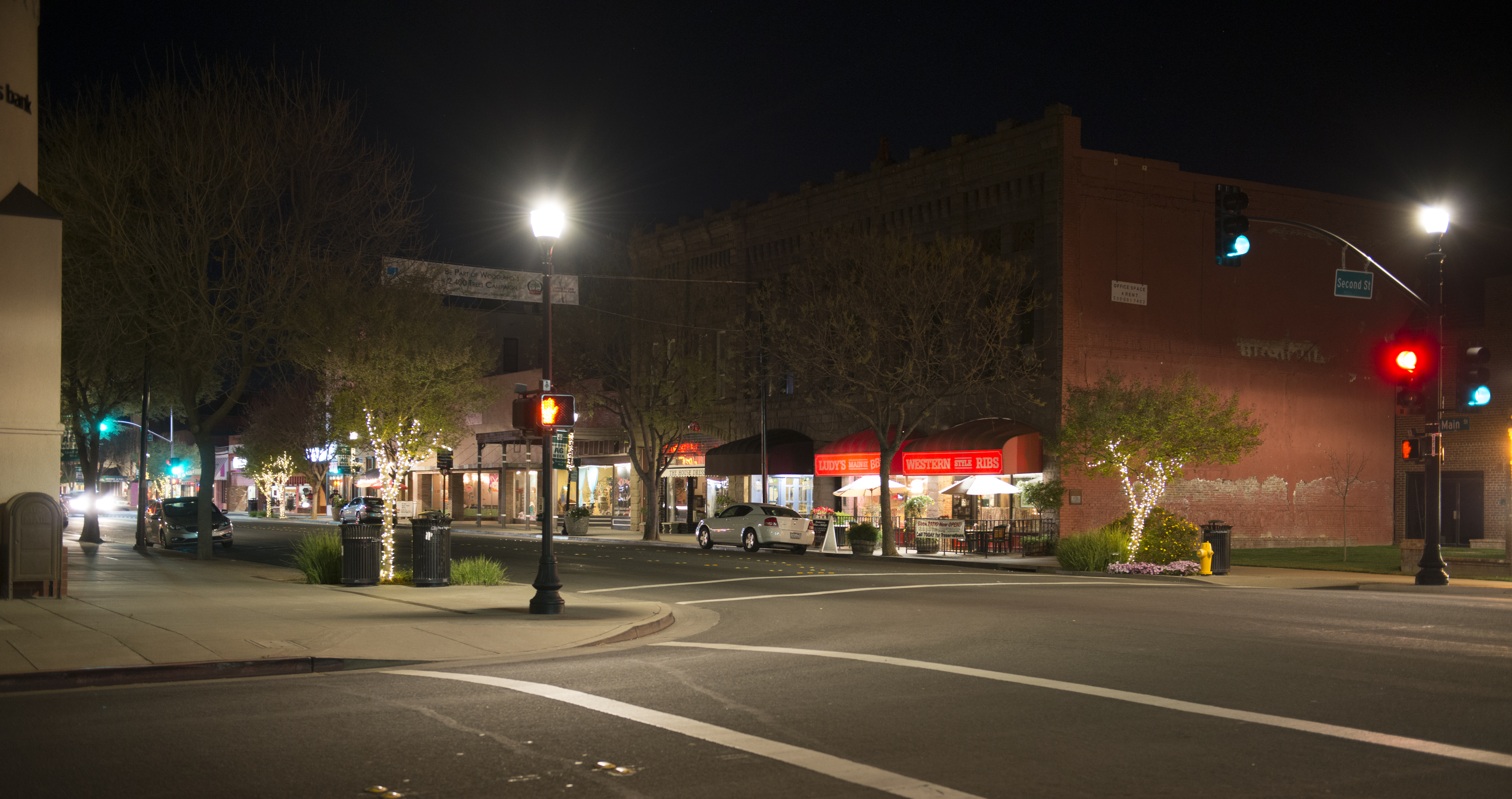
Downtown Woodland, at Second and Main St.

== Geography and climate ==
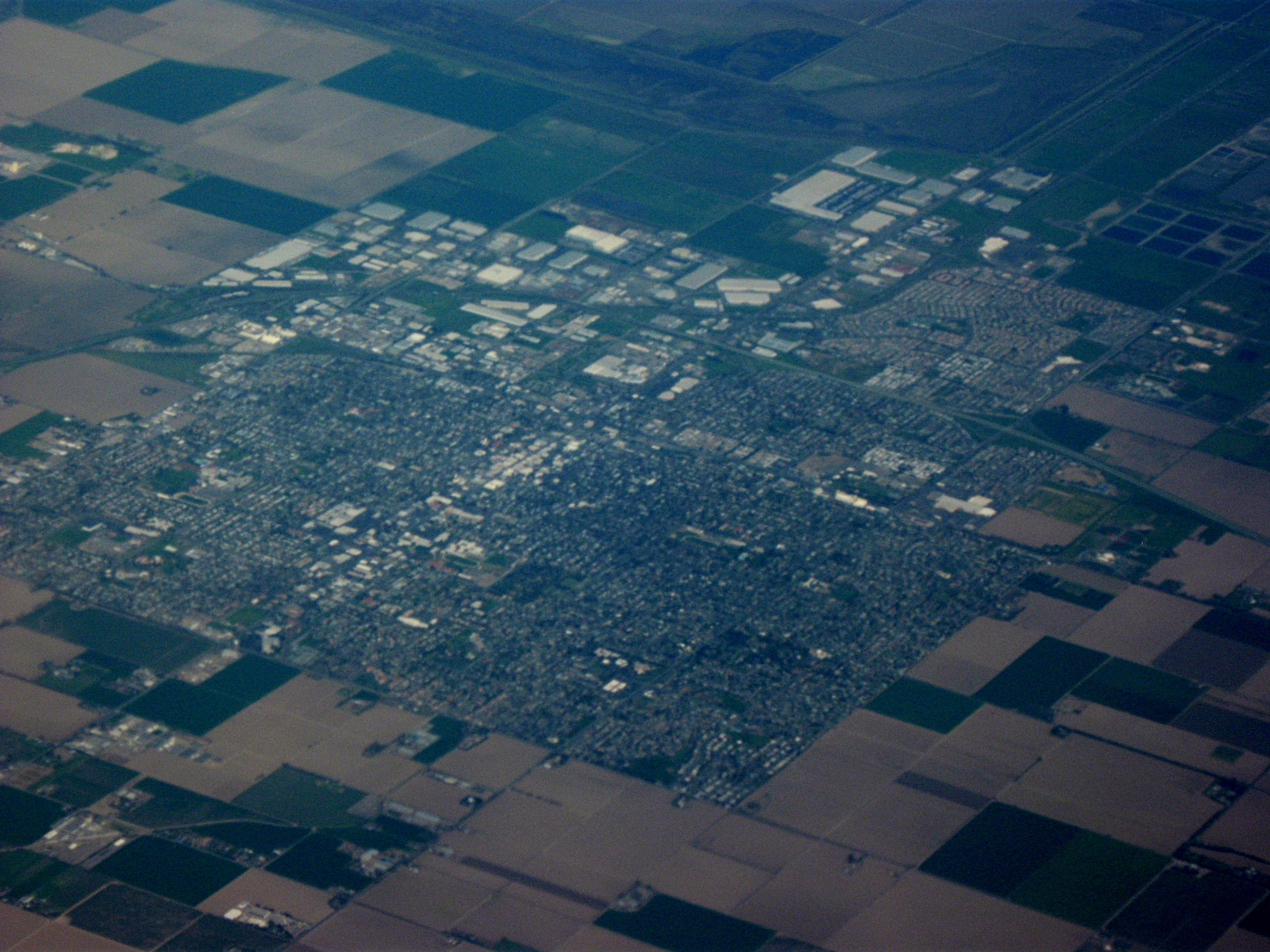
Aerial view of Woodland from southwest

Woodland is located on flat land in the Central Valley (California), with the Yolo Bypass and the Sacramento River to the east and the Capay Valley and the Coast Range to the west. Woodland is a part of the Sacramento Metropolitan Area but it retains a "small town" feeling partly due to the mileage between the city and the neighboring cities. It is located just southeast of the county's geographical center, and is one of the largest cities north of Sacramento along Interstate 5 until Redding. Interstate 5 enters the city from the east and curves northward over the remainder of Woodland, exiting northwest. SR 113 enters the city from the south as a controlled access freeway and merges with the I-5, then diverges leaving the city northward as a standard two-lane road. The city is surrounded by farmland.

Woodland calls itself the "City of Trees". Valley oaks are the predominant native species planted around the city.

=== Climate ===
Woodland has a Mediterranean climate with dry, hot summers and cool, relatively wet winters, as with the rest of California's Sacramento Valley. The rainy season is generally from October through April. In the hottest month, July, the average high temperature is 94 °F; in January the average high is 56 °F. Average lows range from 58 °F in July to 38 °F in December and January. January is typically the wettest month with about 3.92 inches (100 mm) of rain. All-time extremes for Woodland are 15 °F and 114 °F.

Woodland has a zone 9b botanical plant hardiness climate zone, typical of the Sacramento Valley.

Summer brings warm days, with temperatures frequently in the upper 90s, but the "Delta Breeze" that blows into the valley through the Carquinez Strait usually makes for comfortable evenings and nighttime temperatures in the upper 50s. Occasional heat waves raise the temperature above 100 degrees. During late fall and throughout the winter months, Woodland experiences cooler temperatures, rain from storms originating in the Pacific Ocean and Gulf of Alaska, tule fog, and a few mornings of frost and freezing conditions. When the chilling fog does not burn off, daytime highs may remain in the 40s or low 50s for several consecutive days. Snow is extremely rare in Woodland; the last measurable snowfall occurred on January 28, 2002. The Sierra Nevada mountains, about 60 miles to the east of Woodland, receive significant amounts of snow each winter, contributing to the cool weather. Precipitation becomes much less frequent in April and May as the days gradually get warmer.

Climate data for Woodland, California (1991–2020 normals, extremes 1906–present)
Month	Jan	Feb	Mar	Apr	May	Jun	Jul	Aug	Sep	Oct	Nov	Dec	Year
Record high °F (°C)	78 (26)	82 (28)	87 (31)	100 (38)	106 (41)	114 (46)	114 (46)	113 (45)	116 (47)	105 (41)	89 (32)	76 (24)	116 (47)
Mean daily maximum °F (°C)	56.2 (13.4)	61.7 (16.5)	67.5 (19.7)	74.0 (23.3)	81.9 (27.7)	89.6 (32.0)	94.9 (34.9)	94.3 (34.6)	90.3 (32.4)	79.7 (26.5)	65.4 (18.6)	56.4 (13.6)	76.0 (24.4)
Daily mean °F (°C)	46.9 (8.3)	51.2 (10.7)	55.7 (13.2)	60.4 (15.8)	67.0 (19.4)	73.2 (22.9)	76.5 (24.7)	75.8 (24.3)	73.1 (22.8)	65.0 (18.3)	54.0 (12.2)	47.0 (8.3)	62.2 (16.8)
Mean daily minimum °F (°C)	37.6 (3.1)	40.7 (4.8)	43.9 (6.6)	46.9 (8.3)	52.2 (11.2)	56.8 (13.8)	58.2 (14.6)	57.3 (14.1)	55.8 (13.2)	50.4 (10.2)	42.6 (5.9)	37.5 (3.1)	48.3 (9.1)
Record low °F (°C)	15 (−9)	25 (−4)	25 (−4)	30 (−1)	35 (2)	41 (5)	46 (8)	44 (7)	38 (3)	31 (−1)	24 (−4)	19 (−7)	15 (−9)
Average precipitation inches (mm)	4.46 (113)	4.20 (107)	2.82 (72)	1.32 (34)	0.72 (18)	0.21 (5.3)	0.00 (0.00)	0.04 (1.0)	0.16 (4.1)	0.81 (21)	1.95 (50)	3.81 (97)	20.50 (521)
Average snowfall inches (cm)	0.0 (0.0)	0.0 (0.0)	0.0 (0.0)	0.0 (0.0)	0.0 (0.0)	0.0 (0.0)	0.0 (0.0)	0.0 (0.0)	0.0 (0.0)	0.0 (0.0)	0.0 (0.0)	0.0 (0.0)	0.0 (0.0)
Average precipitation days (≥ 0.01 in)	10.8	9.3	7.8	5.0	2.9	0.9	0.0	0.2	0.7	2.8	6.0	9.1	55.5
Average snowy days	0.0	0.0	0.0	0.0	0.0	0.0	0.0	0.0	0.0	0.0	0.0	0.0	0.0
Source: NOAA

== Demographics ==
Historical population
Census	Pop.	Note	%±
1880	2,257		—
1890	3,069		36.0%
1900	2,886		−6.0%
1910	3,187		10.4%
1920	4,147		30.1%
1930	5,542		33.6%
1940	6,637		19.8%
1950	9,386		41.4%
1960	13,524		44.1%
1970	20,677		52.9%
1980	30,235		46.2%
1990	39,802		31.6%
2000	49,151		23.5%
2010	55,468		12.9%
2020	61,032		10.0%
U.S. Decennial Census

=== 2020 census ===
As of the 2020 census, Woodland had a population of 61,032. The population density was 3,985.1 inhabitants per square mile (1,538.7/km^{2}).

The age distribution was 24.2% under the age of 18, 9.2% aged 18 to 24, 27.2% aged 25 to 44, 24.4% aged 45 to 64, and 15.0% who were 65 years of age or older. The median age was 37.0 years. For every 100 females, there were 94.9 males, and for every 100 females age 18 and over there were 92.5 males age 18 and over.

The census reported that 98.6% of the population lived in households, 0.5% lived in non-institutionalized group quarters, and 0.9% were institutionalized. In addition, 100.0% of residents lived in urban areas, while 0.0% lived in rural areas.

There were 20,971 households, of which 37.1% had children under the age of 18 living in them. Of all households, 50.2% were married-couple households, 7.0% were cohabiting couple households, 15.9% were households with a male householder and no spouse or partner present, and 26.9% were households with a female householder and no spouse or partner present. About 22.2% of all households were made up of individuals and 10.4% had someone living alone who was 65 years of age or older. The average household size was 2.87. There were 14,939 families (71.2% of all households).

There were 21,647 housing units at an average density of 1,413.5 units per square mile (545.8 units/km^{2}). Of these, 20,971 (96.9%) were occupied and 676 (3.1%) were vacant. Of occupied units, 57.2% were owner-occupied and 42.8% were occupied by renters. The homeowner vacancy rate was 1.3% and the rental vacancy rate was 2.4%.

Racial composition as of the 2020 census
Race	Number	Percent
White	27,209	44.6%
Black or African American	1,146	1.9%
American Indian and Alaska Native	1,223	2.0%
Asian	5,334	8.7%
Native Hawaiian and Other Pacific Islander	233	0.4%
Some other race	14,390	23.6%
Two or more races	11,497	18.8%
Hispanic or Latino (of any race)	29,614	48.5%

=== 2023 estimates ===
In 2023, the US Census Bureau estimated that 21.7% of the population were foreign-born. Of all people aged 5 or older, 60.0% spoke only English at home, 31.9% spoke Spanish, 4.7% spoke other Indo-European languages, 3.0% spoke Asian or Pacific Islander languages, and 0.3% spoke other languages. Of those aged 25 or older, 84.4% were high school graduates and 30.2% had a bachelor's degree.

The median household income was $87,880, and the per capita income was $38,559. About 5.8% of families and 8.1% of the population were below the poverty line.

== Economy ==
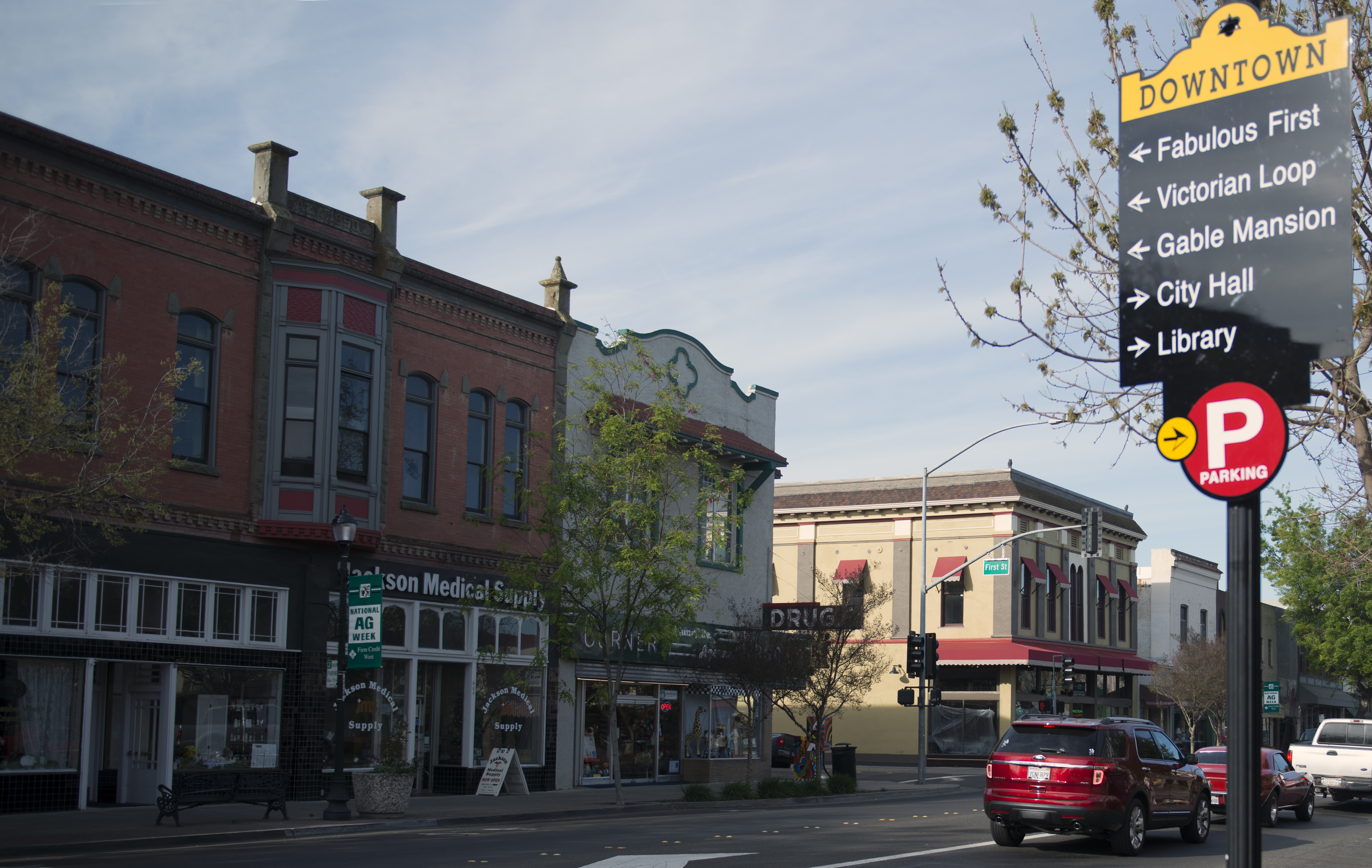
Downtown Woodland

Woodland and the immediate surrounding area's economy has largely been based on agriculture. To this day, Yolo County is one of the largest crop producers in the state. Ranking in America's top 20 for total commodity production, Yolo remains a leader in agricultural production. The transportation industry has played a large part in Woodland's economy, as well. With heavy agricultural production comes the need to transport it. While maintaining the large role that agriculture and transportation still play in the town's activities, over the years Woodland has branched out into other sectors as well.

The industrial sector has grown in Woodland as is seen by the numerous manufacturing and warehouse centers. Modular homes are one of the largest manufactured goods in town. Several major retail stores have warehouses in Woodland or just outside the city limits.

When the price of homes rose in California during the first half of the decade, Woodland was near the front of the wave due to many factors including proximity to Sacramento and its maintenance of a small community feeling. Its convenient location, as well as its strong sense of community has made Woodland a desired place to live. As a result, in 2002 Woodland had the highest percentage increase in property value in the nation.

Ease of access to the city provided by the close proximity of I-5 and I-80 as well as the Sierra Northern Railway and the California Northern Railroad are most likely why businesses have done so well in Woodland. Woodland's short distance from the Sacramento and San Francisco metro areas also provide businesses another reason to set up shop in town.

=== Top employers ===
According to the city's 2020 Comprehensive Annual Financial Report, the top employers in the city are:

#	Employer	# of Employees
1	Target Distribution Center	1,325
2	Yolo County	1,300
3	Pacific Coast Producers	1,100
4	Walgreens	600
5	City of Woodland	309
6	Truck Accessories	209
7	Alderson Convalescent Hospital	150
8	PGP International	149
9	Cottonwood HC Inc	118
10	Silvercrest	103

== Arts and culture ==
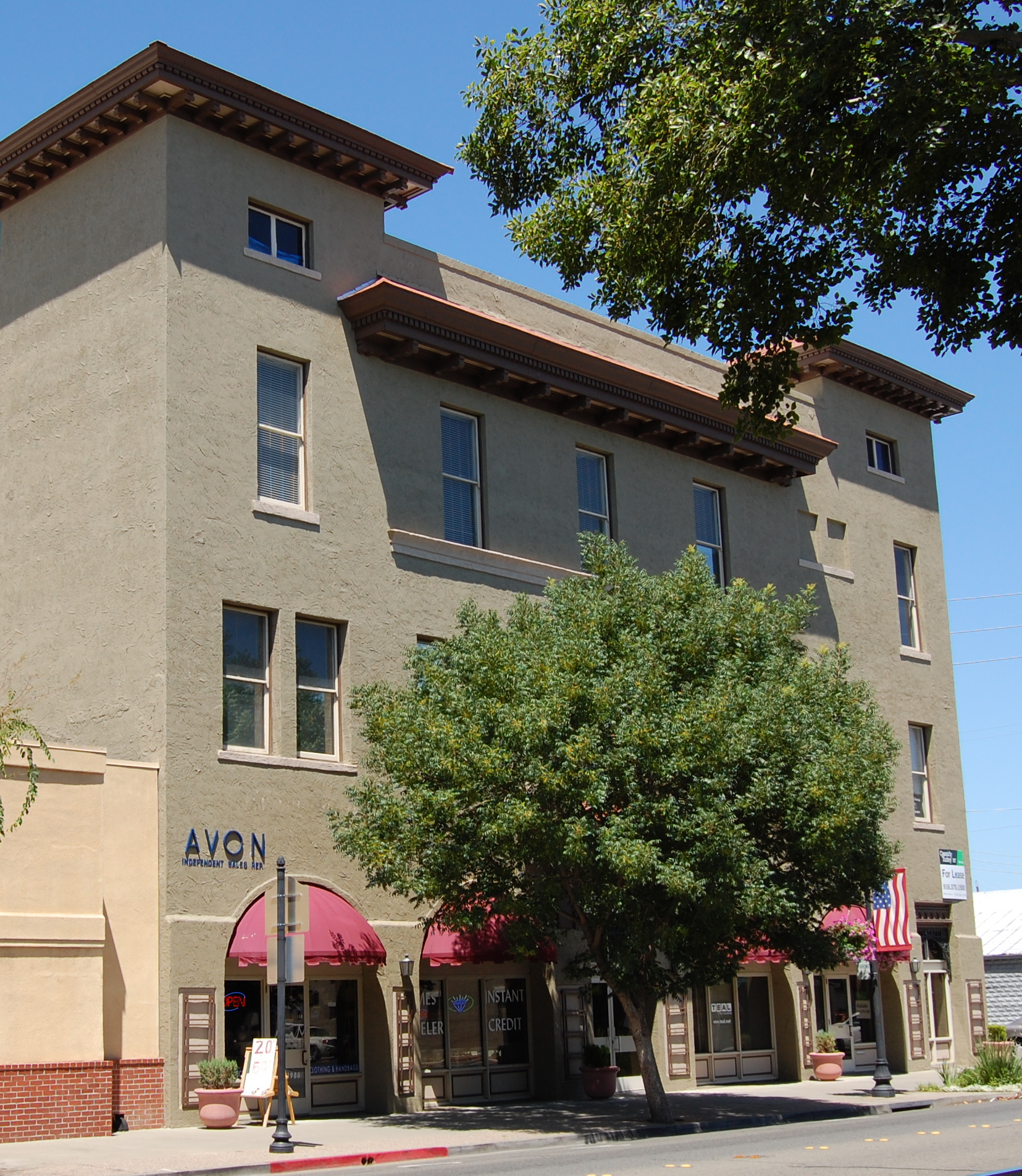
The historic I.O.O.F. Building

The First Friday Art Walk is a monthly event which promotes the work of local and international artists.

=== Annual events ===
The Yolo County Fair is held in Woodland in the middle of August each year, running Wednesday afternoon through Sunday evening. Started in 1935 (and located at the current site since 1940), it is the largest free-admission fair in the state of California, and as such, people come from all over Northern California to enjoy this event. There are demolition derbies in the fairground's arena, local FFA and 4-H competitions going on, as well as several other agricultural related competitions. One of the newest and most popular attractions of the county fair is the "Yolo Idol Search" based on the TV show American Idol. There are also several exhibition halls where fair-goers can peruse through stands set up by local businesses and groups.

In 2008 The Sacramento Valley Scottish Games & Festival celebrated its 11th year at the Yolo County Fairgrounds. The Games feature a wide variety of activities, drawing up to 20,000 visitors each year. The "Games" are the third oldest in the United States. It is also the second largest event in Yolo County. The Games are held the last Saturday and Sunday of April.

The Stroll Through History is a widely celebrated event in Woodland. It is used to increase awareness and appreciation of the history and heritage of Woodland. There are guided walking tours through several historic areas of Woodland, displays of historic equipment, vehicles, and other historical finds, as well as tours inside several of Woodland's historic Victorian homes. Some of the Stroll Through History is free while other parts require tickets purchased in advanced. This event usually takes place on a Saturday within the first two weeks of September.

The Woodland Dynamite Chili Cook-off is a newer addition to Woodland's cultural activities. Beginning in 1998, the cook-off has drawn a lot of people out to try chili cooked from various members of the community. This event also includes other activities such as bounce houses, pony rides and games for the children; live music as well as other food and drink for the adults. The cook off is held the third Saturday of each September at Rotary Park in the Yolo County Fairgrounds.

The City of Woodland and Woodland Chamber of Commerce put on a Christmas parade each year that draws a crowd of around 30,000 people in downtown Woodland. It is one of the largest holiday parades in Northern California. Started in 1964, the Woodland Christmas Parade now has around 150 entries each year, including marching bands, floats, dance groups, military units, and novelty entries from local groups as well as from the surrounding area. The parade runs through Woodland's "Historic Downtown", along Main Street beginning at the intersection of Main Street and California Street and ending at the intersection of Main Street and 6th Street.

=== Museums and other points of interest ===
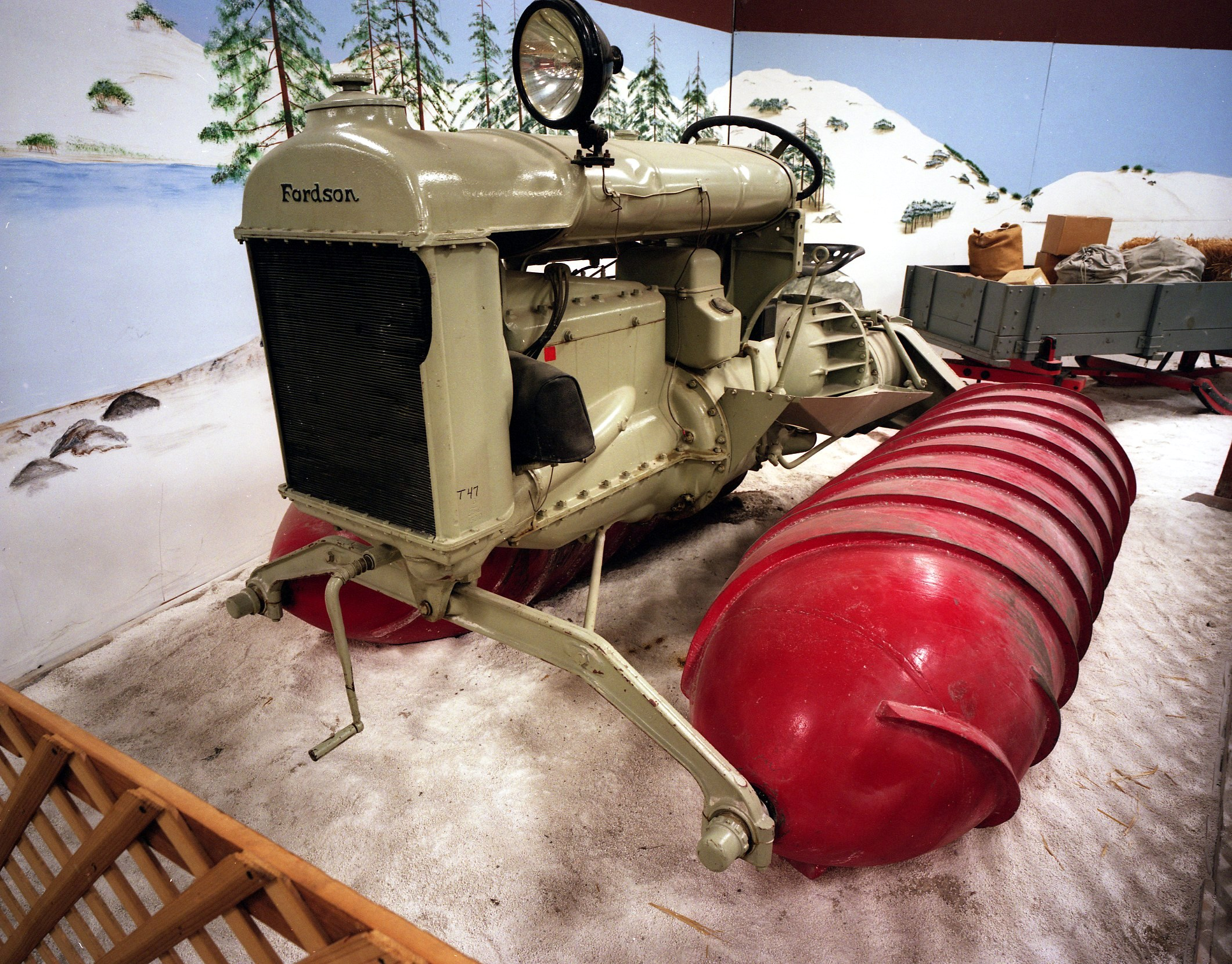
The Fordson snowmobile used to carry the US mail and freight in the Truckee area of the Sierra Nevada Mountains. Heidrick Ag History Center.

There are several small museums in Woodland. The Heidrick Ag History Center is an agriculture and transportation museum. It showcases rare and unique agricultural machinery and vehicles dating from the late 19th century to the middle of the 20th century. It also has a 45,000-square-foot (4,200 m^{2}) events and exhibition hall which features rotating exhibits.

Reiff's Antique Gas Station Automotive Museum has car culture exhibits from the 1950s and 1960s. The antique gas station displays old fashioned gas pumps, gas station signs and logos. Additional exhibits include the old time general store, diner and movie theater.

Another local museum is the Yolo County Historical Museum. It is located on 2.5 acres (10,000 m^{2}) in the former home of Woodland pioneers William and Mary Gibson. The construction of the house itself was started in 1857 and is listed on the National Register of Historic Places. The museum acquired the property in 1975 and it houses furnishings and artifacts dating from the 1850s to the 1930s. Locally called The Gibson Mansion, the house and the property depict everyday living from that era as well as changing exhibits regarding Yolo County history.

Another site of interest is the Woodland Public Library. The original structure was funded by Andrew Carnegie and was constructed in 1905. The Woodland Public Library is the oldest library funded by Carnegie in California that is still in operation.

The Woodland Opera House is a California Historical Landmark and a California State Historic Park that was originally built in 1885 and was rebuilt due to fire in 1895–1896. The opera house was rebuilt on the original site with some of the intact bricks and foundation. It was the first opera house to serve the Sacramento Valley. Some notable performers on its stage include John Philip Sousa and his band, Verna Felton, and Madame Helena Modjeska. Closed in part due to the rise of the motion picture industry, and partly due to a lawsuit involving an injury, the opera house was closed from 1913 until recently. Renovations allowed for the historic building to be opened again and it is now an acting venue in town. Several major productions are shown throughout the year, and many bands use the venue.

== Government ==
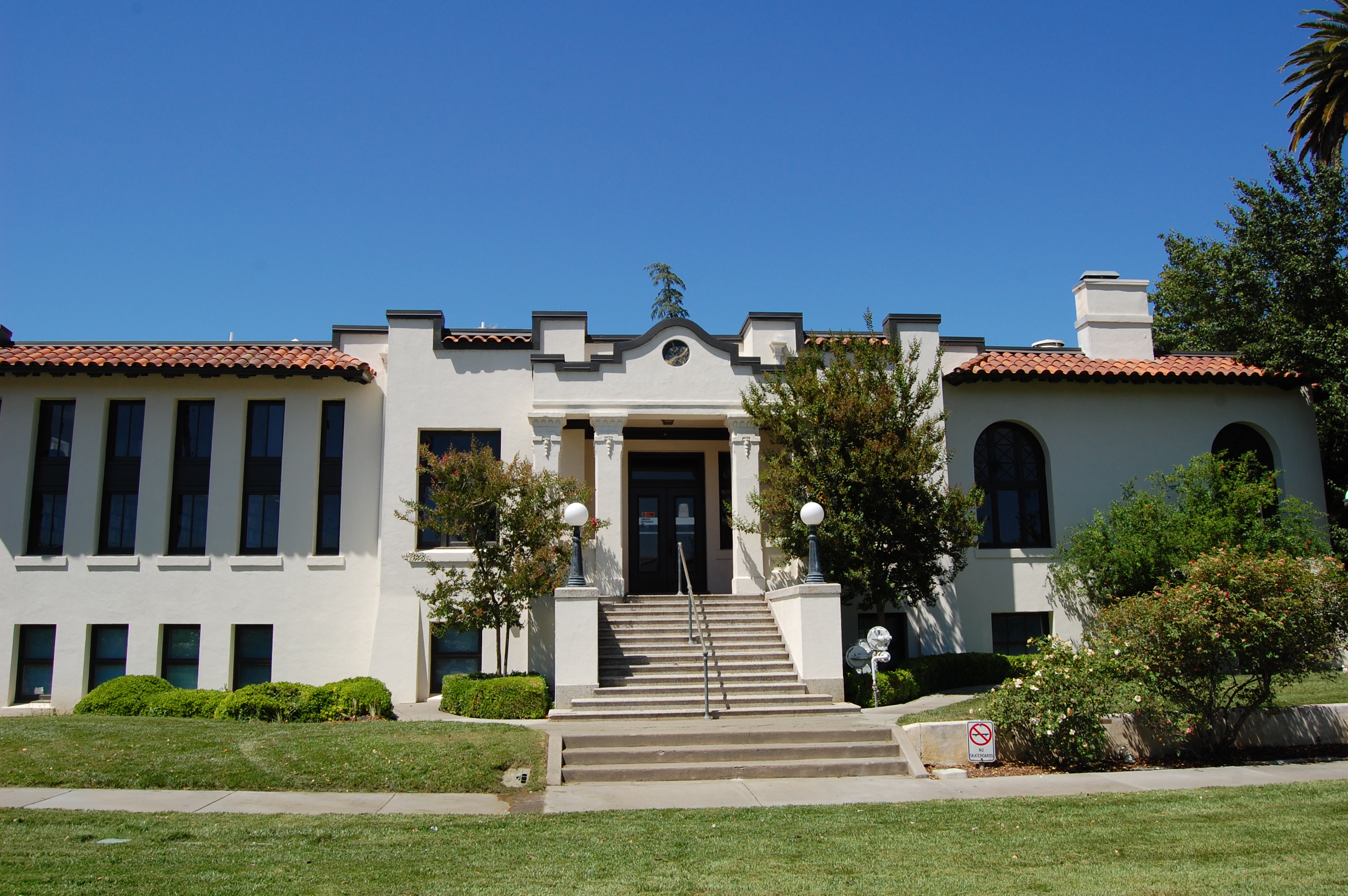
Woodland Public Library

=== Municipal ===
Woodland was incorporated as a general law city, governed by a five-member council, with the mayor serving as presiding officer. The mayor and four council members are elected officials, serving four-year terms. The council selects the vice mayor based on the member who received the greatest number of votes. This council member then serves as mayor during their last two years of office. Day to day, the city is run by a city manager, and has 376 permanent staff positions.

=== State and federal representation ===
In the California State Legislature, Woodland is in the 3rd senatorial district, represented by Democrat Christopher Cabaldon, and the 4th Assembly district, represented by Democrat Cecilia Aguiar-Curry.

In the United States House of Representatives, Woodland is in California's 4th congressional district represented by Democrat Mike Thompson.

== Education ==
Woodland Joint Unified School District services ten elementary schools, one charter school, two middle schools, two high schools, one continuation high school and the adult education center in the area. In 2025, current Woodland Joint Unified School District Trustees include; Deborah Vautista Zavala, President; Noel Rodriguez, Vice President; Laura Brubaker, Clerk; Bibiana Garcia, Member; Kandice Richardson Fowler, Member; Claudia Rodriguez-Mojica, Member; and Rogelio Villagrana, Member.

There are several private schools in town. They include Woodland Christian School, a former ministry of the LifePointe Church (formerly known as First Baptist), which offers classes for children from preschool through high school; Holy Rosary Parish School, run by Holy Rosary Parish, offers enrollment from preschool to 8th grade; Montessori Children's House offers enrollment from preschool through 6th grade; Woodland Adventist School gives classes from preschool to 8th grade; a private school entitled Abby's School has enrollment for preschool and kindergarten; and Cornerstone Christian Academy, using A.C.E.'s School of Tomorrow curriculum, offers classes for pre-school through high school aged students.

Yuba Community College District oversees Woodland Community College, a now fully accredited college.

== Media ==
The local newspaper of Woodland is the Daily Democrat. It was established in 1857 before the City of Woodland was incorporated. The Sacramento Bee is also widely read in town. The WAVE (Woodland Access Visual Enterprises) Channel 21 is Woodland's Public-access television cable TV station which airs footage from a variety of community activities, including local high school football games, the Yolo County Fair, the Woodland Christmas Parade, as well as televised classes from Woodland Community College Educational-access television program. Anyone from the community is able to air approved content.

Several movies have also been filmed, at least partially, in Woodland. They include the movies Farewell Bender, Blood Sport, Letters from a Killer, and selected scenes from Three Men and a Baby.

The documentary Bigger, Faster, Stronger features several scenes in Woodland, and includes interviews with football players from the Woodland Wolves and the Pioneer Patriots.

The cast and crew of the HBO series Big Love filmed in Woodland as part of a week-long filming stint that took them all over Yolo and neighboring counties.

== Infrastructure ==
=== Transportation ===
Woodland is served by Yolo County Transportation District commonly termed 'YOLOBUS'. There are many routes to and from Downtown Sacramento, Davis, Cache Creek Casino Resort, and other areas of Yolo County. Two freeways run through the city, State Route 113 and Interstate 5. Surface streets in town run north and south or east and west. The roads (especially in the older part of the city) are straight, forming a grid. Woodland has also added a transit service called the Beeline by Yolobus that works almost like a rideshare.

Most transportation is by automobile, though it is common to walk or ride bicycles.

=== Utilities ===
Woodland receives its natural gas and electricity services from Pacific Gas & Electric. The City of Woodland provides water and Waste Management removes waste.

=== Healthcare ===
The largest medical facility in town is Woodland Healthcare, a member of Dignity Health. Other facilities include Sutter Health and private practices.

== Notable people ==
- José Antonio Bowen - president of Goucher College
- Scott Brant - 2003 U.S. Speedway National Champion
- Jillian Camarena - champion shot putter, 2008, 2012 Summer Olympics
- Thomas Haden Church - Academy Award-nominated actor, born Thomas Richard McMillen
- Dana Curtis Covey - military veteran, military veteran, orthopaedic surgeon, and academic
- Bobbie Cryner - country singer-songwriter
- John Didion - professional football player
- Vicente Escobedo - boxer, 2004 Summer Olympics
- Loreto Garza - California Boxing Hall of Famer and WBA junior welterweight world champion (1990–1991)
- May Dexter Henshall - county superintendent of schools, California Library Hall of Fame
- George Herms (born 1935), American artist
- Eddy Howard - singer and bandleader
- Sarah Huston - newspaper editor and publisher
- Emma C. Laugenour - philanthropist and social reformer
- Sagen Maddalena - 2024 Olympic Silver Medialist
- Steve March - Oregon politician, born in Woodland
- Hunter Moore - internet personality
- Alyssa Nakken - The first full-time female coach in MLB history
- Dustin Pedroia - professional baseball player
- Craig Penrose - former professional football player
- Neil C. Roberts - former Petty Officer 1st Class, Navy SEAL
- Charles R. Schwab - founder of eponymous stock brokerage firm
- Mungo Thomson - visual artist
- Tony Torcato - professional baseball player
- Frona Eunice Wait - journalist and author
- Paul Wulff - college and NFL football coach
- Jack Lloyd Yerman - 1960 Olympic champion and football player

== Sister cities ==
Woodland has one sister city, as designated by Sister Cities International:

- La Piedad, Michoacán, Mexico

== See also ==
- Sacramento Metropolitan Area
- Yolo County, California
- Woodland joint unified school district (California)
