= Woodland Opera House =

- U.S. National Register of Historic Places
- U.S. Historic district – Contributing property
- California Historical Landmark No. 851
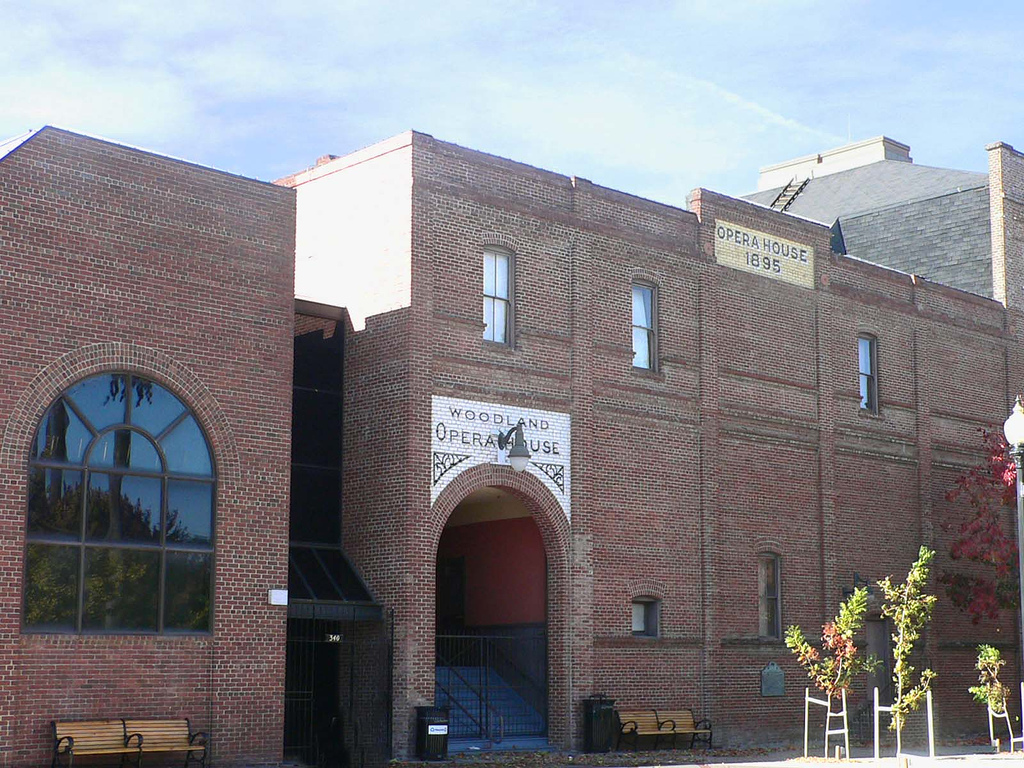
- Facing the entrance of the building from the plaza.

- Location within California Location within the United States
- Location: 340 2nd Street; Woodland, California
- Coordinates: 38°40′40″N 121°46′15″W
- Built: 1885; 1895–1896
- Architect: Thomas J. Welsh
- Architectural style: 19th Century American Playhouse
- Part of: Downtown Woodland Historic District (ID99000471)
- NRHP reference No.: 71000212
- CHISL No.: 851

Significant dates
- Added to NRHP: November 5, 1971
- Designated CP: June 22, 1999
- Designated CHISL: 1972

The Woodland Opera House, listed on the National Register of Historic Places and a California Historical Landmark, is one of four fully functioning 19th century opera houses in California. It is a contributing property to the Downtown Historic District of Woodland, California.

== History ==
Designed in 1885 by Thomas J. Welsh, a prominent San Francisco architect, for the amount of $28,000. It was the first opera house to serve the Sacramento Valley. The builder for the community theater was Woodland contractor William Henry Curson. Several years later in July 1892 a fire that started in Dead Cat Alley behind the Opera House destroyed much of what is now the Downtown Woodland Historic District, including the Opera House. There was uncertainty whether the House would be rebuilt when a locally renowned businessman, David N. Hershey, purchased the site. Other local businessmen supported the project in addition to Hershey. The Opera House was rebuilt between 1895 and 1896 by local contractor William H. Winne at the cost of $8,990. Many of the materials from the original building were used including some of the partially standing walls.

By 1913 over 300 touring companies had appeared on its stage, and the Woodland Opera House was becoming an entertainment center for the region. Nevertheless, the venue closed in that year, after ticket sales declined and the theater lost a lawsuit by an attendee who had mistaken a loading door for an exit and fell three feet, breaking an arm.

=== A new beginning ===
The Opera house remained closed and unused for almost sixty years until 1971 when it was purchased by the Yolo County Historical Society, for a sum of $12,000. After many local fund drives, donations, and monies from several different government agencies including the City of Woodland, restoration of the building began. Declared a state historic park in 1976, the building was later deeded to the State of California in 1980. The Opera House reopened in 1989 after a $2,000,000 restoration project. Extensive work was still done over the next nine years. Gary Wirth, an architect from Woodland, oversaw the work and Brocchini & Associates of Oakland provided most of the materials for the restoration of the theater including antique wallpaper, lighting, and paint colors.

In the restoration the building was made structurally safe and "earthquake proofed". Central heat and air-conditioning, a sprinkler and alarm system, and handicap access were added. An annex was constructed for storage of mechanical equipment, as well as for administrative office space, a gift counter, the Mid Level Lounge, and a rooftop exterior deck. The interior restoration effort received an Award of Merit from the California Preservation Foundation and a Citation Award from the League of Historic American Theaters.

In 1990 with the help of Woodland Rotary Club, the south side grassy "Rotary Court" was added to the existing outdoor plaza, named Intermission Garden. The Intermission Garden's brick marquee and entrance sign was designed by Brocchini & Associates and was added the same year.

== Architectural design ==
The present Opera House is a simple, two-story, red brick structure. The structure is approximately 104 feet long by 60 feet wide; and its walls are 20 inches thick. A stage house on top of the north end of the Opera House (destroyed by fire in the 1930s) rose to a height of 60 feet above the street level. The building partially shares a common wall with the building on its western side

Its interior is an example of 19th-century American playhouses. The layout of the stage is a typical proscenium arch. It combines the horseshoe balcony with an uninterrupted semi-circular seating arrangement and large orchestra seating area like the common theme in Italian Renaissance-Revival theaters.

== Productions ==
The Opera House holds mainstage subscriber productions from September to June. The theatre also has a summer youth theatre camp in August of each year and a Young People's Theatre Program that runs throughout the year. Along with many concerts throughout the year. Each production runs from 2 to 5 weekends. The theatre also works with the Yolo County Office of Education to provide very low ticket prices for students for school day performances of plays that are currently running.

Some notable performers on the WOH stage in the late 19th and early 20th century include Nance O'Neil, James A. Herne, Harry Davenport, Madame Helena Modjeska, John Philip Sousa and his band, comics Weber and Fields, George M. Cohan's troupe, "Gentleman Jim" Corbett, John L. Sullivan as well as rising motion picture stars Sydney Greenstreet, Walter Huston and Verna Felton.

In addition to play and drama productions, the Opera House is also used for a variety of music performances, comedians, and in rare cases even weddings.

== See also ==
- Structure of theaters
- Play (theater)
