= List of Carnegie libraries in California =

The following list of Carnegie libraries in California provides detailed information on United States Carnegie libraries in California, where 142 public libraries were built from 121 grants (totaling $2,779,487) awarded by the Carnegie Corporation of New York from 1899 to 1917. In addition, academic libraries were built at two institutions (totaling $60,000).

== Key ==
Building still operating as a library
Building standing, but now serving another purpose
Building no longer standing
Building listed on the National Register of Historic Places
Building contributes to a historic district on the National Register of Historic Places

== Public libraries ==
| | Library | City or town | Image | Date granted | Grant amount | Location | Notes |
|---|---|---|---|---|---|---|---|
| 1 | Alameda | Alameda | | Oct 3, 1899 | $35,000 | 2264 Santa Clara Ave, Alameda, CA 94105; 37°45′57″N 122°14′37″W | Opened in 1903, this Wilcox and Curtis Neoclassical building served as a public library until 1998. It has been vacant since. |
| 2 | Alturas | Alturas | | Nov 20, 1908 | $10,000 | 201 S. Court St, Alturas, CA 96101; 41°29′3″N 120°32′27″W | This building, designed by F. J. DeLongchamps, opened in 1918 and served as a library until 1947. It now houses law offices. |
| 3 | Anaheim | Anaheim | | Feb 6, 1907 | $10,000 | 241 S. Anaheim Blvd, Anaheim, CA 92805; 33°50′3″N 117°54′49″W | A John C. Austin work, this building opened in 1909. It was a library until 1963, and it has been home to the Anaheim Museum since 1987. |
| 4 | Antioch | Antioch | | Jun 1, 1915 | $2,500 | 519 F St, Antioch, CA 94505; 38°0′52″N 121°48′45″W | This Francis Reid Neoclassical design was Antioch's library from its opening in 1916 until 1967. It is now a church. |
| 5 | Auburn | Auburn | | Mar 9, 1907 | $10,000 | 175 Almond St, Auburn, CA 95603; 38°53′59″N 121°4′19″W | From May 26, 1909, to 1968, this Allen D. Fellows Classical Revival building was the Auburn library. It is now an arts center. |
| 6 | Azusa | Azusa | | Dec 24, 1908 | $10,000 | 213 E Foothill Blvd, Azusa, CA 91702; 34°8′6″N 117°54′20″W | This Norman F. Marsh design was the library in Azusa from 1910 to 1959. The building was razed in 1959 and a new City Hall erected on its site. |
| 7 | Bayliss District | Bayliss | | Jan 5, 1916 | $4,000 | 7830 County Rd 39, Glenn, CA 95943; 39°34′58″N 122°2′48″W | Bayliss sought a grant in conjunction with rural parts of Glenn County, hence its unusual name. Opened in 1917, this W. H. Weeks design continues to operate as one of the most rural Carnegie libraries in the country. |
| 8 | Beaumont | Beaumont | | Apr 28, 1913 | $10,000 | 125 E 8th St, Beamont, CA 92223; 33°55′56″N 116°58′52″W | Opened in 1914, this Neoclassical design by E. L. Hopkins has always served the Beaumont area as a library. An addition was added to the library in 1966 and a community room was finally added in 1981. |
| 9 | Berkeley | Berkeley | | Feb 12, 1903 | $40,000 | Shattuck Ave. and Kittridge St. 37°52′5″N 122°16′7″W | A 1905 John Galen Howard design, this library served the Berkeley area for only 24 years before it was razed in 1929—the first Carnegie library to be demolished in California. |
| 10 | Biggs | Biggs | | Apr 23, 1906 | $5,000 | 464 B St, Biggs, CA 95917; 39°24′48″N 121°42′37″W | |
| 11 | Calexico | Calexico | | Mar 16, 1915 | $10,000 | 420 Heber Ave, Calexico, CA 92231; 32°40′10″N 115°29′33″W | Now in the Calexico Public Library system, after several years of idleness being completely restored and reopened as a computer lab. |
| 12 | Chico | Chico | | Jan 7, 1904 | $10,000 | 141 Salem St, Chico, CA 95928; 39°43′45″N 121°50′32″W | Now housing the Chico Museum. |
| 13 | Chula Vista | Chula Vista | | Mar 31, 1916 | $10,000 | | Vacated in 1955. Destroyed in 1960. |
| 14 | Clovis | Clovis | | Mar 11, 1914 | $7,000 | 325 Pollasky Ave, Clovis, CA 93612; 36°49′33″N 119°42′6″W | Now home to the Clovis Chamber of Commerce. |
| 15 | Coalinga | Coalinga | | Jan 27, 1912 | $20,000 | | Demolished in 1955. Designed by architects Swartz, Hotchkin and Swartz, in a Mediterranean Revival style, as one of the three high school district California Carnegies. The new Coalinga Library is on the site. |
| 16 | Colton | Colton | | Apr 10, 1906 | $10,000 | 380 N La Cadena Dr, Colton, CA 92324; 34°4′7″N 117°19′25″W | Now the Colton Museum. Designed by architect Franklin P. Burnham, a temple style Classical Revival building, with pediment and columns, two fireplaces and skylight above a central rotunda. It served as both library and community center. In 1982 it was carefully restored to house the museum. |
| 17 | Colusa | Colusa | | Jan 19, 1905 | $10,000 | 260 6th St, Colusa, CA 95932; 39°12′49″N 122°0′35″W | Now houses the Colusa Police Department |
| 18 | Concord | Concord | | Jun 1, 1915 | $2,500 | | Demolished in 1959. |
| 19 | Corning | Corning | | Aug 11, 1913 | $10,000 | 618 4th St, Corning, CA 96021; 39°55′44″N 122°10′52″W | |
| 20 | Corona | Corona | | Mar 25, 1905 | $11,500 | | Demolished in 1978, the year after being listed on the NRHP |
| 21 | Covina | Covina | | Apr 11, 1905 | $9,000 | | Demolished in 1962. |
| 22 | Dinuba | Dinuba | | Mar 16, 1915 | $8,000 | | Demolished in 1975. |
| 23 | Dixon | Dixon | | Nov 21, 1911 | $10,000 | 135 E B St, Dixon, CA 95620; 38°26′48″N 121°49′19″W | Now the Dixon Unified School District Library. Dixon is one of only three California communities to obtain a Carnegie library as a high school district rather than city or county. Designed by architects Parker and Kenyon, in the Mission Revival-Classical Revival style, and designated as historically significant by the Dixon city council in 1988. |
| 24 | Eagle Rock | Eagle Rock | | Mar 11, 1914 | $7,500 | 2225 Colorado Blvd, Los Angeles, CA 90041; 34°8′22″N 118°12′53″W | The building is now Center for the Arts Eagle Rock. Designed by architect W.E. Kleinpell, in the Mission Revival-Spanish Colonial Revival styles and opened in 1915. In 1923 it became a branch library when Eagle Rock was annexed by Los Angeles. |
| 25 | East San Diego | East San Diego | | Jun 1, 1915 | $10,000 | | Demolished in 1964. |
| 26 | El Centro | El Centro | | Feb 13, 1909 | $10,000 | 539 State St, El Centro, CA 92243; 32°47′29″N 115°33′21″W | El Centro Public Library. Extensive earthquake damage in the late 1920s necessitated drastic strengthening procedures with steel banding; with successive additions, the Classical Revival building was plastered over to create a Modern look. Closed due to damage it sustained during the 2010 Baja California earthquake, it was demolished in 2016. |
| 27 | Escondido | Escondido | | Jun 29, 1908 | $7,500 | | Demolished in 1956. Designed by the Los Angeles architectural firm of Van Trees and Millar Inc., in the Classical Revival style, and one of the few to display the name "Carnegie Library." The new Escondido Public Library building is on the site. |
| 28 | Eureka | Eureka | | Oct 3, 1901 | $20,000 | 636 F St, Eureka, CA 95501; 40°48′2″N 124°9′52″W | Restored by the Humboldt Arts Council, now used as The Morris Graves Museum of Art. |
| 29 | Exeter | Exeter | | May 8, 1914 | $5,000 | 309 S E St., Exeter, CA 93221; 36°17′37″N 119°8′20″W | Present day Exeter community center. |
| 30 | Ferndale | Ferndale | | Mar 21, 1908 | $8,000 | 807 Main St, Ferndale, CA 95536; 40°34′47″N 124°15′35″W | Designed by architect Warren Skellings, in a bold Classical Revival style. The only Carnegie Grant Library in northwestern California still functioning as a library |
| 31 | Fresno | Fresno | | Feb 14, 1901 | $30,000 | 1330 Broadway Street, Fresno CA 93721 | Demolished in 1959. The Fresno Carnegie Library was one of the earliest and costliest of the Carnegies. Architects Copeland and Dole of New York designed the large building in the Classical Revival style. |
| 32 | Fullerton | Fullerton | | Dec 8, 1905 | $10,000 | | Demolished in 1942. Designed by architects Hunt and Eager, in the Mission Revival-Spanish Colonial Revival styles. Another library built on site and it now houses the Fullerton Museum Center. |
| 33 | Gilroy | Gilroy | | Mar 12, 1906 | $10,000 | 195 5th St, Gilroy, CA 95020; 37°0′28″N 121°34′18″W | Formerly the Gilroy Free Library, now the Gilroy Historical Museum. The building is virtually unchanged. Designed by architect W. H. Weeks, one of his seven "classic Carnegies" of the Greek temple style, with pediments and columns. |
| 34 | Glendale | Glendale | | Aug 11, 1911 | $12,500 | | Demolished in 1977. Architect Paul Tuttle designed the building in the Classical Revival style; a 1940 WPA project added wings to each side. New Glendale Public Library building was built nearby and the old library demolished once the new, larger building was open. |
| 35 | Grass Valley | Grass Valley | | Jan 6, 1915 | $15,000 | 207 Mill St, Grass Valley, CA 95945; 39°13′0″N 121°3′47″W | Designed by architect William Mooser, its Classical Revival red brick facade is highlighted with numerous white pilasters. |
| 36 | Gridley | Gridley | | Jan 2, 1913 | $7,000 | 519 Kentucky St, Gridley, CA 95966; 39°21′49″N 121°41′48″W | Now a private office. Designed by Chico architect Chester Cole, in the Classical Revival style. |
| 37 | Hanford | Hanford | | Mar 20, 1903 | $12,500 | 109 East Eighth St, Hanford, CA 93230; 36°19′39″N 119°38′43″W | The Hanford Carnegie Museum since 1974. Designed by the McDougall Bros. and one of California's few in the Richardson Romanesque style. |
| 38 | Hayward | Hayward | | Feb 20, 1906 | $11,750 | | Demolished in 1949. |
| 39 | Healdsburg | Healdsburg | | Aug 31, 1909 | $10,000 | 221 Matheson St, Healdsburg, CA 95448; 38°36′40″N 122°52′2″W | Replaced in 1988 by a new library building a few blocks away. Now serves as the Healdsburg History Museum. Classical Revival (Type B), reinforced concrete faced with a 1/2" layer of textured white concrete, scored to resemble stone blocks. |
| 40 | Hemet | Hemet | | Nov 30, 1910 | $10,000 | | Has roots from 1906 in the Hemet Woman's Club opened a reading room on the second floor of a bank on the Bothin Block. 1910 building designed by architect S. L. Pillar, in the Classical Revival with a large raised open loggia;demolished in 1969. New libraries were built in 1971; named after Clarence B. Covell, a Library Board member from 1910 to 1920. Current library built June 21, 2003; designed by John Loomis, the library is approximately 52,000 square feet (4,800 m^{2}). |
| 41 | Hollister | Hollister | | Apr 16, 1910 | $10,000 | 375 Fifth St, Hollister, CA 95023; 36°51′4″N 121°24′12″W | Now the Hollister City Hall. Designed by architect William Binder. The low, one story Classical Revival style building is constructed of concrete scored to resemble granite block. |
| 42 | Hollywood | Hollywood | | Feb 28, 1906 | $10,000 | | Demolished in 1958. Designed by architects Marsh and Russell, one of only two California Carnegie libraries in the Tudor Revival style. In 1910 when Hollywood was annexed to Los Angeles, it became a branch library. |
| 43 | Huntington Beach | Huntington Beach | | Feb 13, 1913 | $10,000 | | Demolished in 1951. Designed by architects Tuttle and Hopkins, in an elaborate Classical Revival style, in red brick with white elements. The new Huntington Beach Public Library was built on site in 1951. |
| 44 | Imperial | Imperial | | Jan 23, 1909 | $10,000 | | Designed by W. H. Weeks; heavily damaged by the 1940 El Centro earthquake and subsequently torn down. |
| 45 | Inglewood | Inglewood | | Nov 9, 1916 | $10,000 | 101 S Grevillea Ave; 33°57′42″N 118°21′17″W | Designed by an unknown architect in the Mission Revival and Spanish Colonial Revival styles. It was severely damaged in the 1933 Long Beach earthquake, and the city voted funds to rebuild and enlarge it. Demolished in 1967; the new Inglewood Public Library was built across Manchester Boulevard and completed in 1973. A temporary library existed on Queen Street. |
| 46 | Lakeport | Lakeport | | Nov 17, 1914 | $8,000 | 200 Park St, Lakeport, CA 95453; 39°2′35″N 122°54′50″W | Houses University of California, Davis scientists for Clear Lake research. Designed by architects Ward and Blohme, in an austere Classical Revival style in the city park on the shores of the lake. |
| 47 | Lincoln | Lincoln | | Dec 13, 1907 | $6,000 | 590 5th St, Lincoln, CA 95648; 38°53′31″N 121°17′28″W | The Lincoln Public Library. Built in the Mediterranean Revival-Classical Revival style, with the brick and terra cotta products of notable Gladding, McBean Pottery. |
| 48 | Livermore | Livermore | | Aug 5, 1909 | $10,000 | 2155 3rd St, Livermore, CA 94550; 37°40′46″N 121°46′7″W | Now a museum, the Livermore Heritage Guild History Center. The Classical Revival building, designed by W. H. Weeks, is an example of the library as "temple in the park," with its pedimented central portico supported by Greek Ionic columns and located in the center of Carnegie Park. The building's distinctive yellow brick came from the nearby Carnegie Brick Works. |
| 49 | Lodi | Lodi | | Dec 13, 1907 | $9,000 | 305 W Pine St, Lodi, CA 95240; 38°8′4″N 121°16′35″W | Now the "Carnegie Forum and City Council Chambers". The temple style Classical Revival Lodi Carnegie is notable for the incorporation of brick in the formed columns, triangular area within the pediment, and finely detailed trim. |
| 50 | Lompoc | Lompoc | | Dec 13, 1909 | $10,000 | 200 South H St, Lompoc, CA 93436; 34°38′13″N 120°27′27″W | Now the Lompoc Museum, an historical and archeological museum. Designed by W. H. Weeks in the Classic Revival "temple style," and designated Lompoc Historical Landmark No. 1. |
| 51 | Long Beach | Long Beach | | Jan 19, 1905 | $30,000 | | In 1972 the Classical Revival style library was damaged by fire, and in 1973 demolished for a new Long Beach Public Library. |
| 52 | Los Angeles Arroyo Seco | Los Angeles | | Jan 31, 1911 | $210,000 | | Designed by architect Frederick Ashley, in the Classical Revival style. Demolished in 1959. |
| 53 | Los Angeles Boyle Heights | Los Angeles | | Jan 31, 1911 | — | | Designed by architect W.J. Dodd, in the Classical Revival style. Demolished in 1974. |
| 54 | Los Angeles Cahuenga Branch | Los Angeles | | Jan 31, 1911 | — | 4591 W Santa Monica Blvd, Los Angeles, CA 90029; 34°5′27″N 118°17′20″W | Designed by architect C.H. Russell, in the Italian Renaissance Revival style. |
| 55 | Los Angeles Lincoln Heights | Los Angeles | | Jan 31, 1911 | — | 2530 Workman St, Los Angeles, CA 90031; 34°4′34″N 118°12′50″W | |
| 56 | Los Angeles Vermont Square | Los Angeles | | Jan 31, 1911 | — | 1201 W 48th St, Los Angeles, CA 90037; 33°59′59″N 118°17′45″W | |
| 57 | Los Angeles Vernon | Los Angeles | | Jan 31, 1911 | — | | Designed by architects Kysor and Biggar, in the Classical Revival style. The Vernon open air reading room could be converted into a closed room by means of a sliding sash. Demolished in 1974. |
| 58 | Los Gatos | Los Gatos | | Oct 17, 1901 | $10,400 | | Demolished in 1954. |
| 59 | Mill Valley | Mill Valley | | Jan 18, 1910 | $10,000 | 52 Lovell Ave, Mill Valley, CA 94941; 37°54′22″N 122°33′0″W | Now a private residence. |
| 60 | Monrovia | Monrovia | | Jan 19, 1905 | $10,000 | | Demolished in 1956. |
| 61 | Monterey | Monterey | | Dec 24, 1907 | $10,000 | 425 Van Buren St, Monterey, CA 93930; 36°36′0″N 121°53′50″W | Now the offices of the Monterey Institute of International Studies. Designed by W. H. Weeks in the Mission Revival style. |
| 62 | National City | National City | | Feb 13, 1909 | $10,000 | | Demolished in 1954. It is the site of the National City Civic Center. |
| 63 | Nevada City | Nevada City | | Mar 20, 1904 | $10,000 | 211 N Pine St, Nevada City, CA 95959 | Now the Doris Foley Library for Historical Research, in the Nevada County Library System. Designed by architect: W. H. Weeks, in the Romanesque Revival style, constructed of dark gray "man-made" cast stone, and rough and smooth concrete blocks fabricated at the site. It is part of the historic downtown district placed on the National Register of Historic Places in 1985, and was added in its own right in 1990. |
| 64 | Newman | Newman | | Nov 17, 1914 | $8,000 | 1209 Main St, Newman, CA 95360 | Now the Newman Museum, the first pioneer museum in Stanislaus County when it opened in the library basement in 1941, and which now occupies the whole building. Designed by Antioch architect Francis Reid, essentially Classical Revival style with Colonial elements in a tall, red brick building. |
| 65 | Oakdale | Oakdale | | May 15, 1916 | $7,000 | 315 West F St, Oakdale, CA 95361 | In 1916 Sadie Haslam, one of the founding members of the Oakdale's Women's Improvement Club, donated the land to Stanislaus County to be used as library. Designed by Stockton architect and engineer Hugh Y. Davis in Mission/Spanish Colonial Revival style, the building's upper floor housed the Oakdale Library from 1917 to 1976, while the bottom floor was used for court proceeding. The building was sold in 1976 for private use and is currently private offices. |
| 66 | Oakland Main | Oakland | | Aug 23, 1899 | $190,000 | 659 14th St, Oakland, CA 94612 | Oakland Main Library 1902–1951. Charles Greene Branch 1951–1994. Now housing the African American Museum and Library at Oakland. |
| 67 | Oakland Golden Gate | Oakland | | Aug 23, 1899 | — | 5606 San Pablo Ave, Oakland, CA 94608 | |
| 68 | Oakland Melrose | Oakland | | Aug 23, 1899 | — | 4805 Foothill Blvd, Oakland, CA 94601 | |
| 69 | Oakland Miller | Oakland | | Aug 23, 1899 | — | 1449 Miller Avenue, Oakland, CA 94601 | 23rd Avenue Branch 1918–1966, Ina Coolbrith Branch 1966–1972, and Latin American Branch 1972–1976. No longer a library since the 1990s, the building was destroyed by fire on 23 February 2018. |
| 70 | Oakland Temescal | Oakland | | Aug 23, 1899 | — | 5205 Telegraph Ave, Oakland, CA 94609 | Named the Alden Branch Library 1918–1948, Temescal Branch Library 1948–present. |
| 71 | Ontario | Ontario | | Jun 8, 1905 | $12,000 | | Designed by architect F. P. Burnham in the Classical Revival style. Condemned and demolished in 1959. |
| 72 | Orange | Orange | | Mar 9, 1907 | $10,000 | 407 E Chapman Ave, Orange, CA 92866 | Demolished in 1961. Site used for larger library which has since been demolished. |
| 73 | Orland | Orland | | Nov 3, 1913 | $8,000 | 912 3rd St, Orland, CA 95963 | Designed by W. H. Weeks, now a community center. |
| 74 | Orosi | Orosi | | Sep 14, 1917 | $3,000 | 12646 Ave 416, Orosi, CA 93647 | The last Carnegie library to be completed in California. Now the Orosi/Cutler Branch Library. It is one of only three wood frame (non-masonry) California Carnegies, designed by architect: Ernest J. Kump in the American Craftsman Bungalow style. |
| 75 | Oroville | Oroville | | May 2, 1911 | $10,000 | 1675 Montgomery St, Oroville, CA 95965 | Designed by W. H. Weeks; now the Butte County Public Law Library |
| 76 | Oxnard | Oxnard | | Feb 13, 1906 | $12,000 | 424 South C St, Oxnard, CA 93030 | Carnegie Art Museum. Designed by Los Angeles architect F.P. Burnham, with four wide pedimented porticos, each supported by six Doric columns, the Oxnard Carnegie gives the impression of a temple on a hill. Designated a Ventura County landmark, and in 1971 was the first California Carnegie to be placed on the National Register of Historic Places. |
| 77 | Pacific Grove | Pacific Grove | | Mar 12, 1906 | $10,000 | 550 Central Ave, Pacific Grove, CA 93950 | The Pacific Improvement Company donated the land for the new library. The building was designed by the McDougall Brothers in the Mission style. The cornerstone was laid on November 9, 1907, and the Pacific Grove Carnegie Library officially opened on May 12, 1908. |
| 78 | Palo Alto | Palo Alto | | Feb 20, 1903 | $10,000 | | Demolished in 1967 to make room for a new city hall. |
| 79 | Paso Robles | Paso Robles | | Dec 13, 1906 | $10,000 | Paso Robles City Park, 800 12th St, Paso Robles, CA 93446; 35°37′34″N 120°41′24″W | The building, designed by W. H. Weeks, has housed the El Paso de Robles Area Historical Society Museum since 1998. In 1906 the Board of Library trustees "ladies" correspondence with Andrew Carnegie resulted a letter offering that if the Paso Robles City Council agreed to provide a suitable site and maintain the Free Public Library, he would be glad to give six thousand dollars to erect the building. |
| 80 | Patterson | Patterson | | Jun 6, 1917 | $3,000 | 355 W Las Palmas Ave, Patterson, CA 95363 | |
| 81 | Petaluma | Petaluma | | Jan 13, 1903 | $12,500 | 20 4th St, Petaluma, CA 94952 | Now houses the Petaluma Historical Library & Museum |
| 82 | Pomona | Pomona | | Jan 23, 1902 | $25,000 | 380 North Main Street, Pomona (former site) | Designed by the Burnham & Bliesner architecture firm and C. E. Wolfe, a local architect, in the Classical Revival style. It opened in 1903, was expanded in 1912 with second Carnegie grant, and in 1939 by the Works Progress Administration. Closed and demolished in 1965. Later the main Pomona First Federal Savings & Loan (U.S. Bank) office built on site, since closed, and is home of the American Museum of Ceramic Art. |
| 83 | Porterville | Porterville | | Feb 6, 1907 | $10,000 | | Condemned as unsafe and demolished in 1949. |
| 84 | Redding | Redding | | Mar 20, 1903 | $10,000 | | Demolished in 1965. |
| 85 | Redwood City | Redwood City | | Feb 20, 1904 | $16,000 | | Demolished in 1950. |
| 86 | Richmond | Richmond | | Jan 14, 1909 | $17,500 | 400 Nevin Ave, Richmond, CA 94801 | Designed by W. H. Weeks; now the Richmond Museum. |
| 87 | Riverbank | Riverbank | | Jun 6, 1917 | $3,000 | 3237 Santa Fe St, Riverbank, CA 95367 | Now the Riverbank Historic Museum. |
| 88 | Riverside | Riverside | | Aug 16, 1901 | $52,500 | | Demolished in 1964. California's first Mission Revival style Carnegie, was designed by Burnham and Bliesner who won an architectural competition. The current Riverside Public Library is adjacent to the site of the elaborate original. |
| 89 | Roseville | Roseville | | Apr 25, 1911 | $10,000 | 557 Lincoln St, Roseville, CA 95678 | Designed by W. H. Weeks, now a museum. |
| 90 | Sacramento | Sacramento | | Feb 26, 1914 | $100,000 | 828 I St, Sacramento, CA 95814 | Part of the Central branch, Sacramento Public Library system. |
| 91 | Salinas | Salinas | | Mar 9, 1907 | $10,000 | | Demolished in 1961. |
| 92 | San Anselmo | San Anselmo | | Jan 14, 1914 | $10,000 | 110 Tunstead Ave, San Anselmo, CA 94960 | Built in 1915, San Anselmo's Carnegie library is adjacent to the Town Hall to which it is connected by a wisteria-covered arbor replicating the library's carved rafters and contributing to an Old California aspect. The Spanish Revival style is also carried out in the red tile roof and use of decorative tile and arched windows. Expanded in 1960. Architects: Mitchell and Hodges. |
| 93 | San Bernardino | San Bernardino | | Mar 14, 1902 | $27,600 | | Demolished in 1958. Architects Burnham and Bliesner won a competition with plans for a grand Classical Revival style building. A new library was completed in 1960 on its former site. |
| 94 | San Diego | San Diego | | Jul 7, 1899 | $60,000 | | Demolished in 1952. San Diego received California's first Carnegie grant in 1899, with a large well detailed Classical Revival library building opening in 1902. The San Diego Public Library system continues elsewhere. |
| 95 | San Francisco Main | San Francisco | | Jun 20, 1901 | $375,000 | Civic Center, 200 Larkin St, San Francisco, CA 94102 | Open 1917–1995. Now housing the Asian Art Museum of San Francisco. The original grant of $750,000 was divided so that "[a]bout half (not more, I think less) of this sum should be expended on the central library and the remainder on branch libraries." Main library grant was supplemented by a $780,000 bond issue. |
| 96 | San Francisco Chinatown | San Francisco | | Jun 20, 1901 | — | 1135 Powell St, San Francisco, CA 94108 | Originally North Beach branch, opened 1921. Designed by G. Albert Lansburgh. |
| 97 | San Francisco Golden Gate Valley | San Francisco | | Jun 20, 1901 | — | 1801 Green St, San Francisco, CA 94123 | Opened 1918. Designed by Ernest Coxhead. |
| 98 | San Francisco Mission | San Francisco | | Jun 20, 1901 | — | 3359 24th St, San Francisco, CA 94110 | Opened 1915. Designed by G. Albert Lansburgh. |
| 99 | San Francisco Noe Valley | San Francisco | | Jun 20, 1901 | — | 451 Jersey St, San Francisco, CA 94114 | Opened 1916. Designed by John W. Reid Jr. |
| 100 | San Francisco Presidio | San Francisco | | Jun 20, 1901 | — | 3150 Sacramento St, San Francisco, CA 94115 | Opened 1921. Designed by G. Albert Lansburgh. Today the branch library also houses the city's only Library for the Blind. San Francisco's seventh and last Carnegie branch is centered on a generous lot which extends through its city block uphill from Sacramento to Clay, with landscaping directed by John McLaren of Golden Gate Park. The brick Classical Revival building was designed by G. Albert Lansburgh, and is on San Francisco's "List of Architecturally Significant Buildings." |
| 101 | San Francisco Richmond | San Francisco | | Jun 20, 1901 | — | 351 9th Ave, San Francisco, CA 94118 | First Carnegie branch to open in San Francisco, 1914. Designed by Bliss and Faville. |
| 102 | San Francisco Sunset | San Francisco | | Jun 20, 1901 | — | 1305 18th Ave, San Francisco, 94122 | Opened 1918. Designed by G. Albert Lansburgh. |
| 103 | San Jose Main | San Jose | | Mar 8, 1901 | $57,000 | | Demolished in 1960. |
| 104 | San Jose East | San Jose | | Mar 8, 1901 | — | 1102 E Santa Clara St, San Jose, CA 95116 | |
| 105 | San Leandro | San Leandro | | Dec 13, 1907 | $12,000 | | Designed by W. H. Weeks; demolished in 1959. |
| 106 | San Luis Obispo | San Luis Obispo | | Feb 12, 1903 | $10,000 | 696 Monterey St, San Luis Obispo, CA 93401 | Designed by W. H. Weeks; now San Luis Obispo County History Center and Museum, downtown on Mission Plaza. |
| 107 | San Mateo | San Mateo | | Apr 20, 1905 | $12,500 | | Demolished circa 1968. |
| 108 | San Pedro | San Pedro | | Mar 25, 1905 | $10,375 | | Designed by architects Edelsvard and Saffell, as well as H. V.Bradbeer, in the Classical Revival style. Demolished in 1966 |
| 109 | San Rafael | San Rafael | | Dec 20, 1904 | $25,000 | 1100 E St, San Rafael, CA 94901 | Wing of current San Rafael Public Library building. |
| 110 | Sanger | Sanger | | Nov 17, 1914 | $10,000 | | Demolished in 1969. |
| 111 | Santa Ana | Santa Ana | | Jan 22, 1902 | $15,000 | | Designed by architects Bither, Dennis and Farwell, in the Mission Revival style. Demolished in 1960. |
| 112 | Santa Barbara | Santa Barbara | | May 8, 1914 | $50,000 | 40 E Anapamu St, Santa Barbara, CA 93101 | Santa Barbara Public Library |
| 113 | Santa Cruz Main | Santa Cruz | | Feb 15, 1902 | $29,000 | 224 Church St | The 1904 Richardsonian Romanesque-style Santa Cruz Main, designed by W. H. Weeks, was the scene of a 1910 visit by Andrew Carnegie, a festive civic event. Demolished in 1966 and replaced by the current building. |
| 114 | Santa Cruz East Cliff | Santa Cruz | | Feb 15, 1902 | — | 1305 E Cliff Dr, Santa Cruz, CA 95062 | Designed by W. H. Weeks, now the Santa Cruz Museum of Natural History. |
| 115 | Santa Cruz Eastside | Santa Cruz | | Feb 15, 1902 | — | | Demolished in 1968. |
| 116 | Santa Cruz Garfield Park | Santa Cruz | | Feb 15, 1902 | — | 705 Woodrow Ave, Santa Cruz, CA 95060 | Santa Cruz Library branch, designed by W. H. Weeks. |
| 117 | Santa Maria | Santa Maria | | Jan 8, 1908 | $10,000 | 420 S. Broadway Street | Demolished in 1969. |
| 118 | Santa Monica Main | Santa Monica | | Apr 13, 1903 | $25,000 | | Designed by architects Marsh and Russell, in the Classical Revival style. Demolished in 1974. |
| 119 | Santa Monica Ocean Park | Santa Monica | | Apr 13, 1903 | — | 2601 Main St, Santa Monica, CA 90405 | Addition added to rear, active branch of Santa Monica Public Library. |
| 120 | Santa Rosa | Santa Rosa | | Mar 14, 1902 | $26,900 | | Condemned as unsafe in 1960. Demolished in 1964. |
| 121 | Sebastopol | Sebastopol | | Nov 21, 1911 | $7,500 | | Demolished in 1976. Another library constructed on site. |
| 122 | Selma | Selma | | Mar 14, 1905 | $6,000 | | Demolished in 1952. |
| 123 | Sonoma | Sonoma | | Apr 25, 1911 | $6,000 | 453 1st St E, Sonoma, CA 95476 | Now the Sonoma Visitor Center. |
| 124 | South Pasadena | South Pasadena | | Dec 13, 1906 | $18,600–1906, $6600–1916 | 1100 Oxley Str, South Pasadena, CA 91030 | South Pasadena Public Library. One of the few visited by Carnegie on his 1910 trip to California. Designated a South Pasadena Cultural Heritage Landmark in 1972. |
| 125 | South San Francisco | South San Francisco | | May 8, 1914 | $10,000 | 306 Walnut Ave, South San Francisco, CA 94080 | Grand Avenue Branch of the South San Francisco Public Library; 1916 addition designed by W. H. Weeks |
| 126 | St. Helena | St. Helena | | Dec 13, 1906 | $8,362 | 1360 Oak Avenue, St. Helena, CA 94574 | Public library from 1908 to 1978, now a community center. |
| 127 | Tulare | Tulare | | Dec 30, 1904 | $10,000 | | Demolished circa 1970. |
| 128 | Turlock | Turlock | | Jun 1, 1915 | $9,200 | 250 N Broadway Ave, Turlock, CA 95380 | Destroyed by fire but walls still standing. Historic building is being restored, within the context of a new, larger addition. Now the Carnegie Arts Center. |
| 129 | Ukiah City | Ukiah City | | May 2, 1911 | $8,000 | 320 S State St, Ukiah, CA 95482 | |
| 130 | Upland | Upland | | May 2, 1911 | $10,000 | 123 East D St, Upland, CA 91786 | Designed by Los Angeles architect Homer Glidden, in the Classical Revival style. Now a community center. |
| 131 | Vacaville | Vacaville | | Mar 14, 1905 | $12,500 | 300 Main St, Vacaville, CA 95688 | |
| 132 | Vallejo | Vallejo | | Dec 27, 1902 | $20,000 | | Demolished in 1969. |
| 133 | Visalia | Visalia | | Feb 2, 1903 | $10,000 | | Demolished in 1936. Replaced with a WPA-built building which is now used as the children's library. |
| 134 | Walnut Creek | Walnut Creek | | Jun 1, 1915 | $2,500 | | Demolished in 1961. |
| 135 | Watsonville | Watsonville | | Apr 23, 1903 | $12,000 | | Designed by W. H. Weeks; demolished 1975. |
| 136 | Watts | Watts | | Jan 9, 1913 | $10,000 | 9901 Grandee Avenue | Was replaced by newer library on different site in 1960. |
| 137 | Whittier | Whittier | | Dec 30, 1904 | $12,500 | Northeast corner of Greenleaf Ave. and Bailey St. | Demolished in 1959. |
| 138 | Willits | Willits | | Dec 8, 1913 | $8,000 | 85 E Commercial St, Willits, CA 95490 | Now Willits Community Television |
| 139 | Willows | Willows | | Feb 12, 1910 | $10,000 | 336 W Walnut St, Willows, CA 95988 | Now the Willows Museum. |
| 140 | Woodland | Woodland | | Feb 20, 1903 | $22,000 | 250 First St., Woodland, CA 95695 | Designed by architects Dodge and Dolliver, in the Mission Revival Style; 1915 addition designed by W. H. Weeks. From 1915 until 1979 the building housed distinct city and Yolo County public libraries. |
| 141 | Yolo | Yolo | | Sep 14, 1917 | $3,000 | 37750 Sacramento St, Yolo, CA 95697 | Designed by architect W. H. Weeks, as a modest low wood frame American Craftsman Bungalow. |
| 142 | Yreka | Yreka | | Mar 14, 1913 | $8,000 | 412 West Miner St, Yreka, CA 96097 | The building is currently vacant. It is likely to be redeveloped to include public and office spaces. |

== Academic libraries ==
| | Institution | City or town | Image | Date granted | Grant amount | Location | Notes |
|---|---|---|---|---|---|---|---|
| 1 | Mills College Margaret Carnegie Library Building | Oakland | | Apr 18, 1905 | $20,000 | The Oval, Mills College, Oakland, CA 94613 | Academic library from 1906 to 1989, now administrative offices and upstairs reading room. The Mills College Margaret Carnegie Library Building, named in honor of Andrew Carnegie's daughter, is the only California Carnegie designed by renowned architect Julia Morgan, in the Spanish Colonial Revival style. |
| 2 | Claremont/Pomona College | Claremont | | Mar 15, 1905 | $40,000 | Pomona College, Claremont, CA 91711 | Building has housed Pomona College offices and classrooms since 1953. Carnegie funded only two academic libraries in California, with terms different than for public libraries. The college was offered $40,000 on condition that it raise an equal endowment for maintenance. Designed by Franklin P. Burnham in a Classical Revival temple style, using reinforced concrete in an imposing exterior. It served students and public until a 1914 L.A. County Library Claremont branch opened. |

== See also ==
- List of libraries in the United States
