= Ventura County Library =

Free public library system in California organized in 1916

Ventura County Library is a free public library system of 12 community libraries and a museum library in Ventura County, California, organized in 1916. At the time of its centennial in 2016, the system provided access to 412,715 physical volumes and more than 500,000 virtual items to its nearly 300,000 card holders.

The Ventura County Library serves and issues library cards to all residents of the county, and to others living elsewhere in California upon request.

== Branches ==
The Ventura County Library consists of 12 libraries and one Mobile Library (added in 2019). There are three locations in Ventura (Foster, Avenue, and Hill Road), and one each in El Rio, Fillmore, Meiners Oaks, Oak Park, Oak View, Ojai, Piru, Port Hueneme and Saticoy. The Research Library of the Museum of Ventura County also participates in the county's system-wide online catalog. The Mobile Library travels throughout Ventura County.

=== Albert H. Soliz Library, El Rio ===
The Albert H. Soliz Library serves the unincorporated community of El Rio, north of Oxnard. In 1991 it was posthumously named for local leader Albert H. Soliz, who volunteered with youth and education-oriented organizations in the community.

=== Avenue Library, Ventura ===
The Avenue Library, on Ventura Avenue in west Ventura, occupies the lower floor of an historic landmark, "Casa de Anza," one of the few remaining brick buildings in the city from the 1920s.

The Avenue Library features a public art mural, "Portrait of a Neighborhood", by Catherine Day, an art instructor at Ventura College. This colorful mural wraps around three walls of the library and depicts scenes from the Chumash and mission era to contemporary street scenes and commemorates the designation of one of Ventura's oldest neighborhoods, the Simpson Tract, as a historic district.

The library has a computer lab and Homework Center, a copy machine, and a magnifying machine for people with low vision. The library has a collection of books and movies for both children and adults in Spanish. There is a small collection of the history of Ventura Avenue and West Ventura.

The library participates in the County Library's Summer Reading Program, and the El Dia de los Ninos/El Dia de los Libros in late April and the Fall Fun Day in late October are popular annual activities at the Avenue Library.

=== E. P. Foster Library, Ventura ===
The public library in Ventura joined the new County Library in 1916. The E. P. Foster Library opened in 1921 at its present location thanks to generous donations from Eugene Preston Foster and his wife, Orpha Mae Foster, who donated funds for a building that originally housed both the public library and city hall. The library building was constructed on what had been the property of the noted horticulturalist, Theodosia Burr Shepard. In 1959, new construction was fronted onto the original brick library that more than doubled the size of the library. In 1999, the library closed for several months for a major renovation that updated the infrastructure and opened the second floor for public access and service.

The Foster Library has expanded children's services on the second floor. There are early literacy classes and a Paws for Reading program which pairs children with trained dogs that the children can read to. Special adult collections include self-help law, a songbook and hymn book collection, and a job and career collection. The library collects heavily in cook books, creating and running a small business, as well as local, California and Western US history. The library is expanding its Spanish language collections for adults, and has a growing DVD collection. There is a large print collection. In addition to the adult fiction collection, Foster Library has separate collection for mysteries, science fiction, short stories and westerns.

The Topping Room, named after a previous County Librarian, Elizabeth Russell Topping, is available to groups in the community for public meetings for a charge. The room has tables and chairs, a projection screen, and rest rooms.

=== Fillmore Library ===
The library in Fillmore first joined the county library system on February 4, 1916. The branch offers resources and services including books, computer and wi-fi access, and early literacy programs.

=== Hill Road Library, Ventura ===
Hill Road Library opened in December 2017 in a 5,100 square foot facility near the Ventura County Government Center. The east side of Ventura had been without a branch library since the 2009 closure of the H.P. Wright Library near Ventura College amid budgetary shortfalls. The Ventura County Board of Supervisors approved funding for this new branch library in the summer of 2016. The new library features traditional library services, such as literacy tutoring, training classes, and a collection of print materials. It is also the site of pilot program (Express Hours/Open+) allowing adult patrons to access the library up to two hours before staff arrive by using their library cards to enter the building and check out materials.

=== Meiners Oaks Library ===
Meiners Oaks Library, known then as the Matilija Library, joined the new Ventura County Library system in 1917 at the invitation of the first County Librarian, Julia Steffa. By the 1930s the library had outgrown its school location, changed its name to Meiners Oaks Library and moved into half of a military barracks.

Though tree-shaded, quaint, and conveniently located, the little library had inadequate lighting and heating and no water. The library moved to a new location in 1958 and again to an even larger building with a rear garden at 114 N. Padre Juan Avenue in 1974.

=== Mobile Library ===
While the current Mobile Library was established in 2019, the original concept comes from the first Mobile Library in California, which also began in Ventura County. In 1924, Elizabeth Topping travelled by horseback to provide books. The Mobile Library now serves as outreach and provides Wi-Fi access and several other library services.

=== Museum of Ventura County Research Library, Ventura ===
The Research Library of the Museum of Ventura County holds books and archival materials related to the history of the county and surrounding regions. Its holdings are catalogued in the Ventura County Library system and the Central Coast Museum Consortium, and the library is open to the public.

=== Oak View Library ===
The Oak View Library is located in the Oak View Park and Resource Center, which is a success story of a Community Works Project. The community of Oak View, through the efforts of local public and private organizations, grants, and individual donations, helped purchase and develop a former school property for public nonprofit use. The Oak View area assessment district voted a self-imposed tax to fund and sustain the project.

The Center is in the heart of Oak View with a playground, sports field, and buildings built in the "Ojai Scenic" style that embodies a love of natural light and art deco influences. Some of the services offered at the Center include the Oak View Library, Boys & Girls Club, Oak View Teen Center, Ojai Birth Resource and Family Center, and Smart Start Child Development Center.

Oak View Library offers a computer lab with word processing, Internet access, and black & white printing capability, a self-serve copy machine, wireless Internet access. A Homework Center, funded by the Ojai Valley Friends and Foundation helps young people Monday through Thursday from 3 to 5:30 pm. Collections include material of high-interest for children and teens, as well as popular, mystery and large print fiction for adults, a small selection of books on audio CD and a large collection of books on audio-cassette, a selection of DVDs and videocassettes, and a selection of Spanish-language materials for children and adults. In addition, the library has a collection of popular magazines and newspaper subscriptions to the Ventura County Star and the Ojai Valley News.

=== Oak Park Library ===
The Oak Park library is a shared public library / school library facility with the Oak Park High School. the library has a computer lab and copy machine. There are a few Spanish books. There is a Friends of the Library used book store inside the library. Storytime at 10:30 every Thursday morning, and the We'll Read book club for 3rd through 5th graders meets the first Tuesday of the month. The Lego Club meets in the library the first Saturday of each month. Oak Park Library has two "Kill a watt" kits available to check out that allow the a person to see how much electricity is being used at their home, sponsored by the Oak Park Unified School District's Edison Challenge teams in partnership with Oak Park Library. To further protect the environment, the rest rooms use recycled water. The library displays the annual winners of the Oak Park High School art competition sponsored by the Parent Faculty Committee.

=== Ojai Library ===
In 1889 Ojai residents raised $100 and Sherman Thacher donated $500 for books, a library supporter donated a downtown lot and a local builder built a simple wooden building. The George Thacher Memorial Library opened in 1893. In 1907 the building was moved to a larger lot and expanded. In 1916 the Ojai Library became affiliated with the Ventura County Library. The library was moved again in 1928 to land donated by Edward Libbey and a new building designed by Carleton Winslow in a Spanish hacienda style. By 1979 the library needed more space. An addition was designed by architects Fisher and Wilde to double the size of the library to 5,200 square feet (480 m^{2}) and blend with the original Winslow building. Now the library is again in need of an expansion. The Grow Your Library committee was formed in 2006 and is raising money to add a children's wing and meeting room.

=== Piru Library ===
The library in Piru first joined the county library system on February 4, 1916. The branch offers resources and services including books, computer and wi-fi access, and early literacy programs. The branch also offers makerspaces.

=== Ray D. Prueter Library, Port Hueneme ===
Port Hueneme's first library was founded by prominent resident, Senator Thomas Bard, in the 1880s but closed a few years later. In 1909, the Women's Improvement Club reestablished the Hueneme Library which operated as a branch of the Oxnard Library. Ventura County Library began operation of a branch library to serve the Hueneme School District and in 1936, Hueneme Library joined the Ventura County Library system. In 1960, the branch relocated to a new facility.

The current facility was built in 1989, providing Port Hueneme residents with a library reflective of the community's ocean environment, with natural light and ocean wave-inspired Italian glass mosaics by Ventura artist, Helle Scharling-Todd, "designed to express the conflicting energies found in the ever-changing sea." Mosaics representing the tide begin outside the library and continue into the lobby; wave forms are depicted on the far wall inside the library. The building was designed by Scott Ellinwood and incorporates an energy efficient lighting system that makes use of natural light as much as possible (clerestories and windows glazed with high-transmittance, heat absorbing glass allow daylight to be used for interior illumination during the day; sensors switch on electric light as daylight fades).

The library has a computer lab and homework center, a copy machine, a microfilm reader printer and a microfiche reader printer. Prueter Library has books in Spanish for both children and adults. Because the library is in the home of the navy base, the library makes an effort to collect materials about Port Hueneme, the Seabees, and the U.S. Navy.

The library has some collections of older papers that chronicle the city's history on microfilm, including the Port Hueneme Harbor Bulletin (Jun 1, 1938 – Aug 8, 1941); the Port Hueneme Herald (Aug 15, 1941 – May 1, 1942); the Port Hueneme Herald Express (1941–1945 with some missing issues and 1946 – Aug 31, 1951); and the Port Hueneme Pilot (Sep 1951 – Mar 27, 1963).

Annual special events sponsored by the Friends of the Port Hueneme Library include the Spring Carnival, held in late April, with games, prizes, and crafts for children ages 4–10. This annual event is a service project of the Teen Advisory Board. Also held annually is the Horror in the Stacks held in late October. The Library and the Teen Advisory Board invite teens (13-17) for a scary stroll through the "haunted" library.

There are many preschool storytime programs for ages 0–5 and Bilingual storytimes as well. The Friends of the Library have an ongoing book sale in the lobby of the library, with a large book sale held annually in April.

=== Saticoy Library ===
The library in the unincorporated community of Saticoy, east of Ventura, first joined the county library system on March 9, 1916. After the H.P. Wright Library in east Ventura closed in 2009, use of the Saticoy branch tripled. In 2015, the library moved into a new facility, a former hardware store that had served as Saticoy's "unofficial town square." The new location provides three times the floor space and more than twice as many computers, better accommodating users of library services and events, such as its popular tutoring program.

== Library Services ==
=== Youth Services ===
There are a number of different library programs that are focused on serving youth patrons throughout the system. These services include online learning, virtual storytimes, arts and crafts activities, and makerspaces.

=== One County, One Book ===
During the month of September, the Ventura County Library facilitates the One County, One Book program. The book for 2023 is Solito, by Javier Zamora.

== Notable Librarians ==
=== Elizabeth Topping ===
Elizabeth Topping was born in 1882 in Brooklyn, NY. She founded the first book mobile in California. Later, she became a librarian for Ventura County. The community room at E. P. Foster Library is named after her.

== Other Library Systems ==
The libraries of six cities in Ventura County are not part of the county library system, but are operated by their respective city governments. These city libraries are:

- Blanchard Santa Paula Library
- City of Camarillo Public Library
- Moorpark City Library
- Oxnard Public Library
- Simi Valley Public Library
- Thousand Oaks Library
