= Andrew Carnegie Library (Corona, California) =

- U.S. National Register of Historic Places
- Location within California
- Location: 8th and Main Sts., Corona, California
- Coordinates: 33°52′23″N 117°33′56″W
- Area: 0.5 acres (0.20 ha)
- Built: 1905-06
- Built by: S.L. Bloom
- Architect: Franklin Pierce Burnham
- Architectural style: Classical Revival
- NRHP reference No.: 77000324
- Added to NRHP: June 29, 1977

The Andrew Carnegie Library in Corona, California in Riverside County, California, at 8th and Main Streets, was a Carnegie library built in 1905–06. Known also as the Old Corona Public Library, it was listed on the National Register of Historic Places in 1977. The building was demolished in 1978, but apparently still remains listed on the National Register.

The demolition of the building long remained a sore point, with many who fought for the building's preservation. The suggested alternative use for the property was as a fish-fry restaurant, which was never built. In 2010, the property was still an empty lot.

It was a Classical Revival work of architect Franklin Pierce Burnham, and was Corona's only example of Classical Revival style. The building served as Corona's public library from 1906 until 1971.

A new 19,000 square feet (1,800 m^{2}) library was opened in 1971 at Sixth and Main Streets. The library was expanded following a bond vote in 1988. A 1971 photo available from the Corona Public Library shows a library interior, apparently from the modern replacement building.

Its architectural significance "was acknowledged by its placement on the National Register of Historic Places. However, the building stood 'boarded up and vacant while the city raged about what was to be done with the building' from 1971 to 1978. It was demolished in 1978 and the Heritage Room at the new library was 'started as a compromise between keeping the city's history alive and having a new library building.' Corona's library history dates from an 1893 WCTU reading room, replaced by an 1895 YMCA library, in its turn taken over by the Women's Improvement Club and finally transferred to the city in 1900. The early libraries occupied a succession of rented rooms until Carnegie funding of $10,000 was obtained in March,1905. This was increased to $11,500 due to the intercession of J. A. Flagler of New York, who apparently had ties in Corona in addition to being a close friend of Andrew Carnegie. Ground was broken in August and the building was dedicated July 2, 1906. The building was demolished in 1978."

== See also ==
- List of Carnegie libraries in California
