= Sacramento City Library =

- U.S. National Register of Historic Places
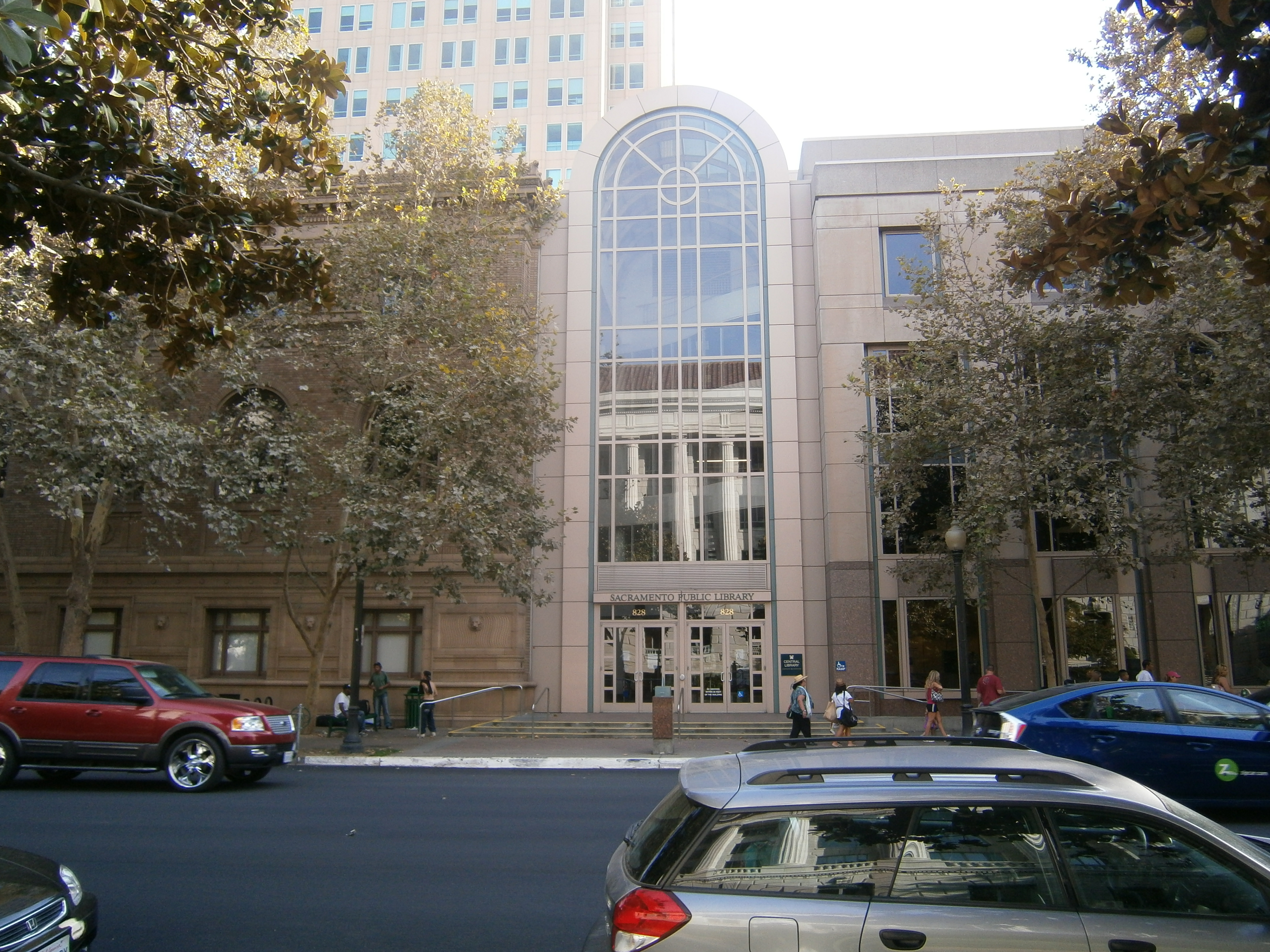

- Location within Sacramento, California Location within California Location within the United States
- Location: 828 I St., Sacramento, California
- Coordinates: 38°34′54.3″N 121°29′42.5″W
- Area: less than one acre
- Built: 1918
- Architect: Loring P. Rixford
- Architectural style: Late 19th And 20th Century Revivals, Italian Renaissance
- MPS: California Carnegie Libraries MPS
- NRHP reference No.: 92000967
- Added to NRHP: July 30, 1992

The Sacramento City Library, also known as Central Branch, is part of the Sacramento Public Library system, and faces I Street in Sacramento, California near Sacramento City Hall.

== History ==
The three-story Italian Renaissance Revival style Sacramento Carnegie library opened on I street between 8th and 9th in 1918, replacing an earlier 1872 building one block to the west. The library was designed by Loring P. Rixford and was financed in large part by a $100,000 grant from Carnegie. The outside of the building retains much of its original appearance, the inside has been significantly updated to meet modern needs. The building was added to the National Register of Historic Places in 1992.

The library was built adjacent to City Plaza Park, now called Cesar E. Chavez Plaza.

== Volunteering ==
The one goal of the Sacramento Public Library involving volunteer programs is: Support library services for over 1.3 million residents in Sacramento County.

In pursuit of that goal, the library uses volunteers to:

- help with large and small one time projects.
- assist librarians and other staff with ongoing special tasks.

== See also ==
- List of Carnegie libraries in California
- National Register of Historic Places listings in Sacramento County, California
- California Historical Landmarks in Sacramento County, California
