= Woman's Improvement Club Clubhouse =

- U.S. National Register of Historic Places
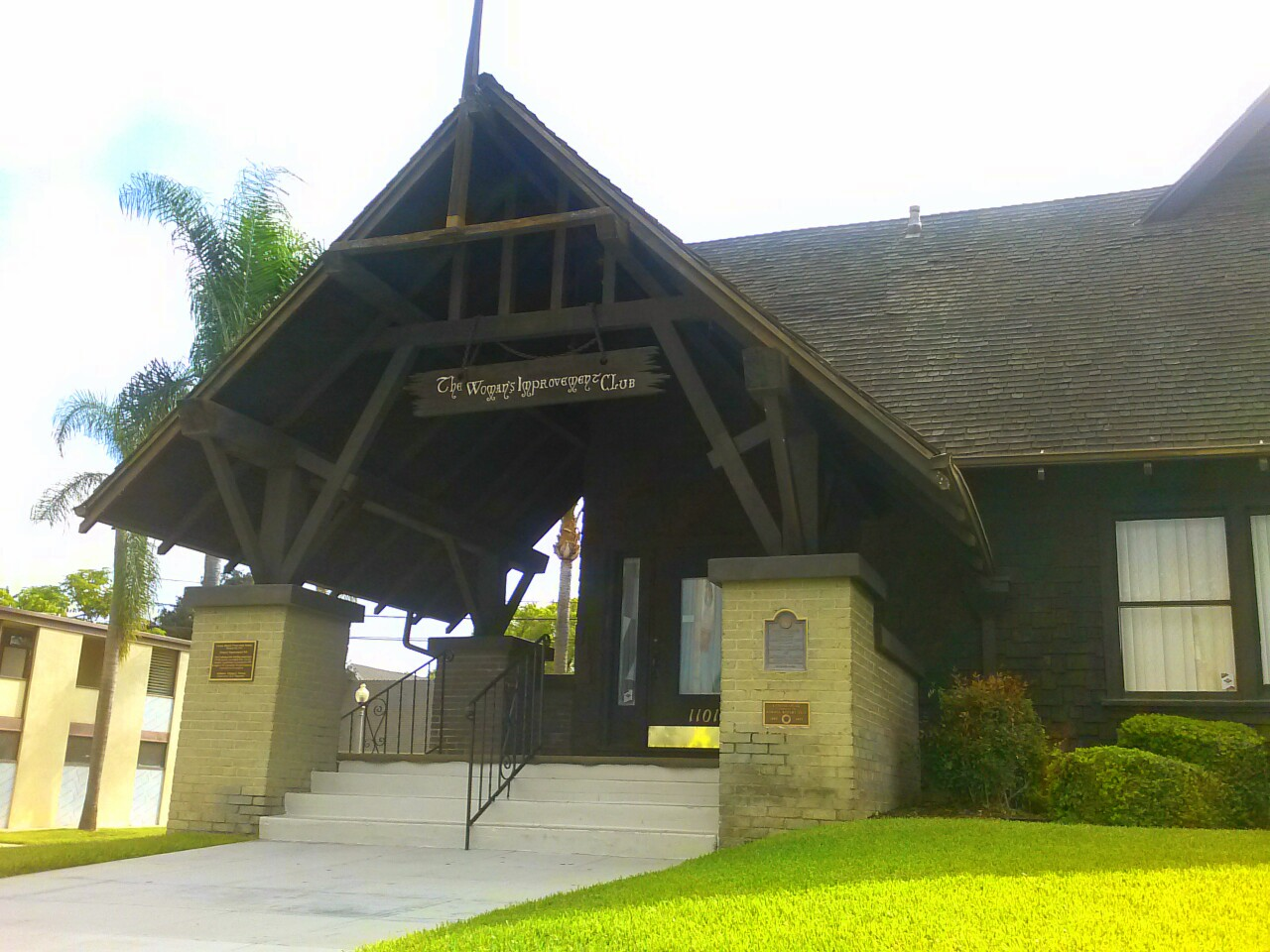

- Location within California
- Location: 1101 S. Main St., Corona, California
- Coordinates: 33°52′12″N 117°33′58″W
- Area: 0.4 acres (0.16 ha)
- Built: 1913
- Architect: Thomas E. Preston
- Architectural style: Craftsman
- NRHP reference No.: 88002014
- Added to NRHP: November 3, 1988

The Woman's Improvement Club Clubhouse in Corona, California, at 1101 S. Main St., was built in 1913. It was listed on the National Register of Historic Places in 1988.

It was designed by Los Angeles architect Thomas E. Preston in Craftsman style.

== Woman's Improvement Club ==
The Woman's Improvement Club of Corona was founded in 1899 as the "Town Improvement Association". The name was changed to the "Woman’s Improvement Club" in 1902. The club is a member of the California Federation of Women's Clubs and the General Federation of Women's Clubs and remains active. It was listed in the 1907 edition of "Club women of California".

Among the early accomplishments of the club was the conversion of the Woman's Christian Temperance Union reading room into a lending library for Corona. The club went on to help obtain funding for a Carnegie library. Later accomplishments include World War I Red Cross relief work, establishment of a school lunch program, and work on establishing the Corona Norco Settlement House.

== Building ==
The Woman's Improvement Club Clubhouse was built in 1913 on land donated by Mrs. Ella L. S. Joy in 1906. The year the building was completed it became the home of the original Red Cross chapter in Corona. In 1922 Corona's first Girl Scout troop met there. The building remains in use as the Woman's Improvement Club.
