= Mr. J. William de Coursey O'Grady House =

Historic house in Illinois, United States

- U.S. National Register of Historic Places
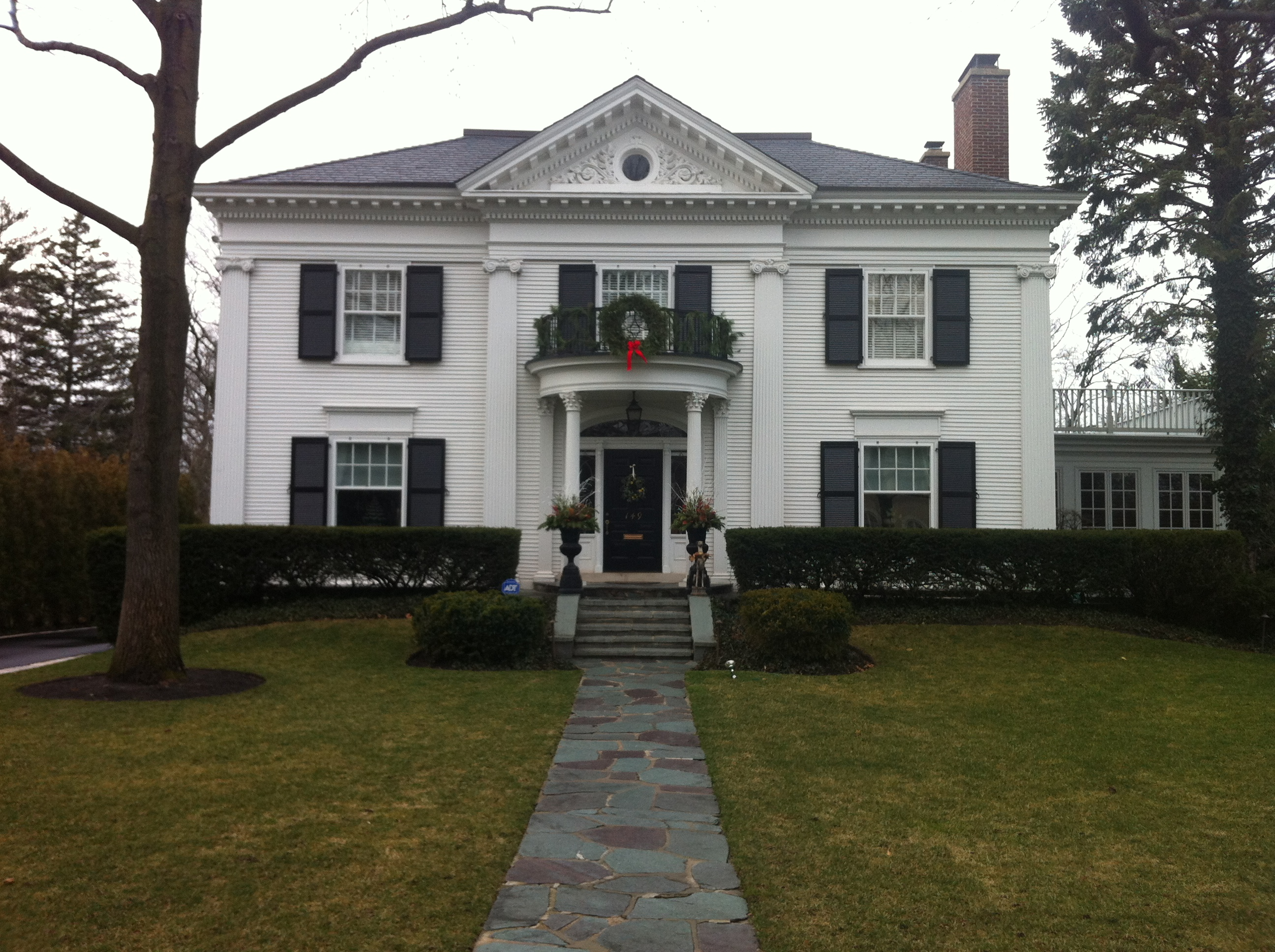

- Location within Chicago metropolitan area Location within Illinois Location within the United States
- Location: 149 Kenilworth Ave., Kenilworth, Illinois
- Coordinates: 42°05′29″N 87°42′43″W
- Area: 0.4 acres (0.16 ha)
- Built: 1898
- Architect: Franklin Pierce Burnham
- Architectural style: Classical Revival
- NRHP reference No.: 08001167
- Added to NRHP: December 12, 2008

The Mr. J. William de Coursey O'Grady House is a historic house at 149 Kenilworth Avenue in Kenilworth, Illinois. The house was built on speculation as part of the Kenilworth Company's initial development in 1898; original owner J. William de Coursey O'Grady did not buy the house until 1901. Architect Franklin Pierce Burnham, the company architect for the Kenilworth Company, designed the Neoclassical house; Burnham had previously designed the Georgia State Capitol and the Kane County Courthouse. While Neoclassical architecture was popular in commercial and government buildings, especially in the years following the 1893 Columbian Exposition, it was not commonly used in houses, and there are few other examples of the style in Kenilworth. The house's design includes a symmetrical facade, four Ionic pilasters, a dentillated architrave and cornice, and a pediment above the entrance.

The house was added to the National Register of Historic Places on December 12, 2008.
