= Hollister Carnegie Library =

- U.S. National Register of Historic Places
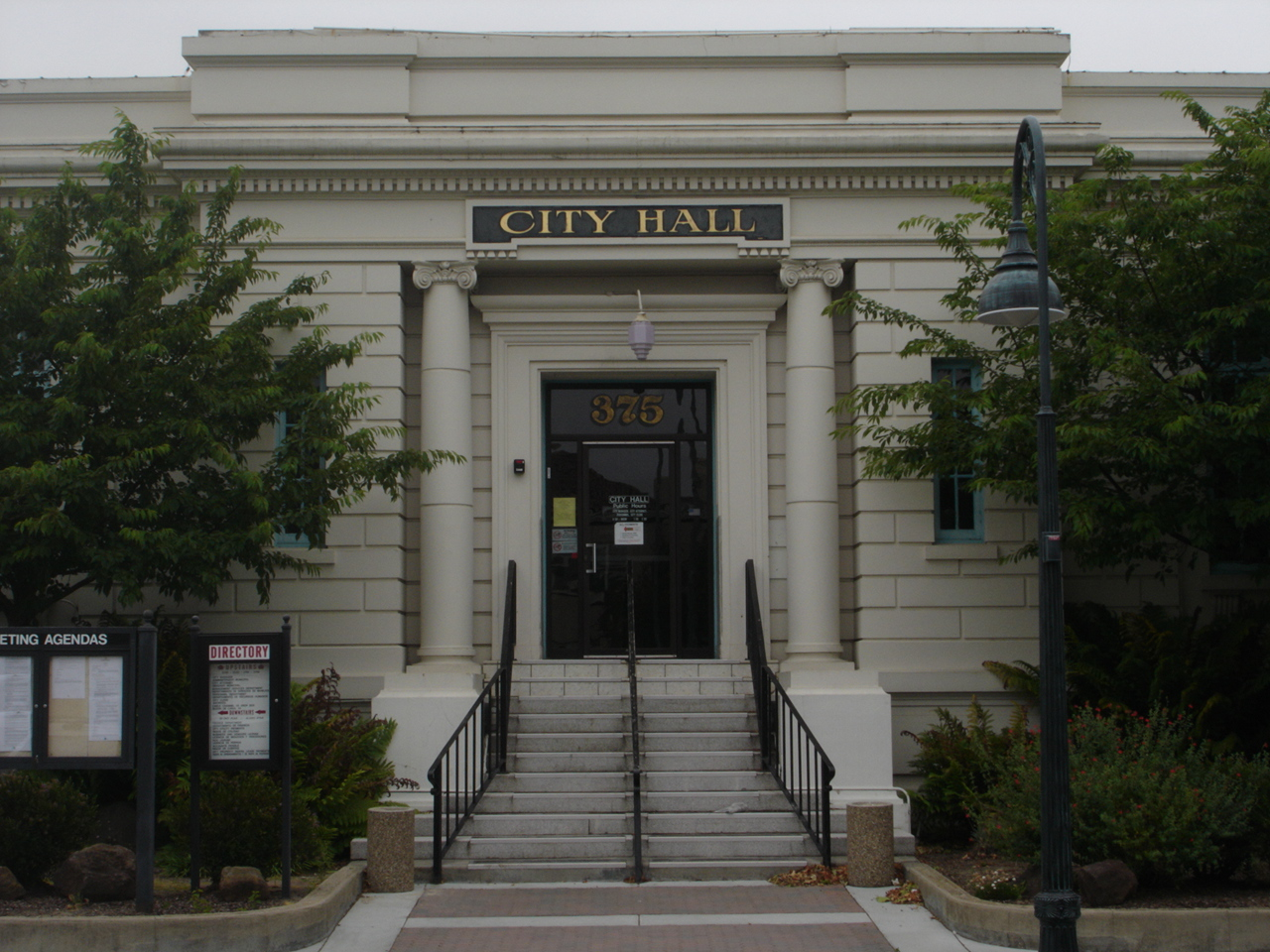
- The Hollister Carnegie Library building now serves as the city hall.

- Location within California Location within the United States
- Location: 375 Fifth St., Hollister, California
- Coordinates: 36°51′4″N 121°24′8″W
- Area: less than one acre
- Built: 1912
- Built by: E.J. Sparling, E.J.
- Architect: William Binder
- Architectural style: Classical Revival
- MPS: California Carnegie Libraries MPS
- NRHP reference No.: 92000269
- Added to NRHP: March 26, 1992

The Hollister Carnegie Library (previously: Hollister Free Public Library; now Hollister City Hall) is located on 375 Fifth Street in Hollister, California, US. Established in 1912 as a Carnegie library, decades later, it was re-purposed as a city hall. The building is part of the downtown's National Register-listed historic district, and was entered itself into the National Register on March 26, 1992.

== History ==
The city's public library, established in 1884, transitioned into the Hollister Library Association, the Mechanics Library Association, and the Woman's Christian Temperance Union reading room. Though the library underwent an expansion after moving into a house on Fifth Street in the early 20th century, it was considered to be too small for the community. After receiving a $10,000 grant from the Andrew Carnegie Library Foundation in 1910, construction of a Carnegie library began in 1911 at 375 Fifth Street. Designed by William Binder of San Jose, the contractor was E. J. Sparling of Hollister. Costs associated with the project included US$2,034 for the 80 by 140 feet (24 m × 43 m) lot, $9,983 for the building, and $500 for the furnishings. In 1960, the Holister library and the San Benito County library consolidated, moving into a new building at 470 Fifth Street, while the Carnegie building was re-purposed as a city hall.

== Architecture and fittings ==
Set back from the street, the slightly raised site contains a retaining wall, lawn, garden area, walkway, and brick path. The one story building with basement was designed in the Type A Classical Revival style. Its particular classicism architecture style was characterized as being unusually inhibited. There is an asphalt roof, molded panels, Ionic columns, exterior and interior stairways, casement windows, and bracketed sills. The structure was considered to be well adapted to its site as the reinforced concrete foundation and walls made sense for a city situated on the Calaveras Fault. A rear expansion occurred in 1986.

== See also ==
- List of Carnegie libraries in California
