= Cesar Chavez Plaza =

Park in downtown Sacramento

César Chávez Plaza
- Cesar Marching to Sacramento by sculptor Lisa Reinertson

- Location within Sacramento, California
- Former name: City Plaza
- Location: Sacramento, California
- Coordinates: 38°34′52″N 121°29′38″W

Construction
- Foundation: 1849

Cesar Chavez Plaza, or Cesar Chavez Park, is a city park in Sacramento, California, named after César Chávez. For more than a century the downtown square has been a focal point for community activities, including the Farmers' Market, music concerts, and community rallies.

Occupying an entire block between I and J Streets and 9th and 10th Streets in downtown Sacramento, Cesar Chavez Park and Plaza currently stands on Old City Plaza founded in 1849 by John Sutter. At one time, the California State Capitol Building was proposed for the location, but the idea was abandoned in 1857 after residents voiced concerns. In 1872, developer and land designer John Keating was hired to create a plan for the park. Many of his original design elements, including the central fountain, circular pathways, and cross-axial walkways still remain today. Cesar Chavez Plaza was designated as part of the Plaza Park/Central Business District Historic District on the city's Register of Historic and Cultural Resources in 1985, and has since been utilized in efforts to bring more residents and businesses to Sacramento's downtown core.

Many prominent and historic buildings with notable architecture surround Cesar Chavez Park and Plaza. To the north of the plaza is architect Rudolph A. Herold's 1911 Beaux-Arts–style Sacramento City Hall and to the south is the newly renovated Citizen's Hotel, originally built in 1926 and designed by G. C. Sellon & Company. Other notable buildings adjacent to the Cesar Chavez Plaza include architect Loring P. Rixford's 1918 Renaissance Revival style Central Library and Leonard Starks' 1933 Neoclassical Federal Post Office Building. The Neoclassical California State Capitol Building, designed by M. Frederick Butler and built between 1861 and 1874, is only three blocks away in Capitol Park. Framing the northeast corner of the Cesar Chavez Plaza is the California Environmental Protection Agency Headquarters, the first building in the United States to receive Platinum LEED certification. Two designated Sacramento City Landmarks exist in Cesar Chavez Plaza, the A.J. Stevens Statue (1888), and the Coleman Memorial (1926).

Cesar Chavez Park and Plaza has undergone multiple renovations during its 150-year lifetime in order to maintain, beautify, and adapt the space for new public needs, such as from 1990 to 1998. Most recently in 2012, the plaza underwent renovations that included installing new turf, planter boxes and benches, and raising the stage for concerts. The plaza continues to be a popular gathering place for residents and visitors. From May through October, a weekly farmer's market is hosted in the plaza by Certified Farmer's Markets of Sacramento. Many concerts are held there throughout the year, including the ongoing concert series Fiesta en la Calle and Friday Night Concerts in the Park. Cesar Chavez Plaza is also home to the Raley's Grape Escape, an event showcasing the region's food and wine offerings. Popular restaurant Cafe Soleil occupies a structure in the plaza, serving breakfast and lunch to residents and employees in the area.

Cesar Chavez Park and Plaza was recognized as a Great Public Space by the American Planning Association in its 2012 list of Great Places in America. Since 2007, the association annually selects certain neighborhoods, streets, and public spaces throughout the United States that display “exemplary character, quality, and planning” and possess a “true sense of place, cultural and historical interest, community involvement, resilience, and a vision for the future.” Cesar Chavez Plaza was chosen by the American Planning Association as a Great Public Space because of its design, historical significance, scenic vistas, frequent use by residents and visitors, and the success of the many planning efforts that have shaped the space into its current form.

Within the Sacramento community, Cesar Chavez Plaza is well-known for serving as a gathering place and living quarters for large numbers of homeless people. Biologist Edward M. Barrows studied some kinds of floral visitors in the Plaza’s four beds of Hemerocallis Stella de Oro in 2014.

In March 2026, following sexual abuse allegations made against Chavez, city officials covered a statue of him as well as signs at the plaza, while announcing further plans to rename the site.
