= Oxnard Public Library =

California, USA public library

Coordinates: 34.20094°N 119.17893°W

The Oxnard Public Library is a free public library system operated by the City of Oxnard, California. It has three locations: the Downtown Main Library, the South Oxnard Branch Library, and the Colonia Branch Library.

== History ==
=== Preface ===
The area, now known as the Oxnard Plain, was inhabited by Chumash Indians. Juan Cabrillo, a visitor, reported to the Queen of Spain in 1542, described the area as the "land of everlasting summers". Approximately 50,000 Indians were in the vicinity. Then other European immigrants began to settle and farming became a major industry.

=== General ===
In 1978, the Colonia Branch Library opened. This library also provides services such as public computers, class visits, and special programs for all ages.

=== Local History Collection ===
The library possesses local newspapers on microfilm. Some of the newspapers are available on the library's online catalog, starting from 1900 to 1904 and 1954 to 1996. The Los Angeles Times is also on microfilm from 1972 to the present.

=== Carnegie Library ===
Shortly after the city of Oxnard incorporated in 1903, city leaders applied to philanthropist Andrew Carnegie for funds to build a local library. In 1906, Carnegie’s Andrew Carnegie Foundation agreed to supply $10,000 to build the library. He later increased his donation to $12,000 after shortages in supplies and labor due to the San Francisco earthquake.

Architect Franklin Pierce Burnham of Los Angeles designed the building in a Neo-Classical style featuring pedimented porticos supported by Doric columns. . The original library building, vacated by the library in 1963, was added to the National Register of Historic Places in 1971 and became the Carnegie Art Museum in 1986.

=== Expansions ===
The main downtown library was moved from the Carnegie building to a larger facility in 1963 and then again in 1992. In the mid to late 20th century, the library expanded services throughout the city of Oxnard. First by offering bookmobile service (1956-1989) then by opening additional branch locations. The main library moved to a second location in the corner of C and second streets in 1963. South Oxnard Branch opened in 1989 which then moved into the new facility in 2007. Colonia Branch, a small neighborhood branch, opened in 1978.

== Services ==
=== Oxnard Public Library ===
- The Downtown Main Library is one of their three locations, including public computers with free internet access available for free with a one-hour time limit. Age-oriented programs include story-times for children, a baby/toddler story-time and story-time for 3 to 5-year-olds.
- South Oxnard Branch Library

The South Oxnard Library hosts story-times for kids and other for-youth services.

- Colonia Branch Library

The Colonia Branch Library is open from Monday to Thursday from 12 p.m. to 6 p.m.

=== Resources and databases ===
Patrons have access to local and regional newspapers and databases to which the library subscribes. Volunteers provide free one-on-one tutoring those over the age of 18.

=== Carnegie Oxnard Public Library ===
The Carnegie Oxnard Public Library, now the Carnegie Art Museum (424 South C St) was built and opened in 1906 under a $12,000 Carnegie grant. It was a functioning library until 1963. and was renovated and reopened in 1980 as the Carnegie Art Museum.

=== Passport services ===
Oxnard became the 4th US library to offer passport services.
