= Hanford Carnegie Museum =

- Carnegie Library of Kings County
- U.S. National Register of Historic Places
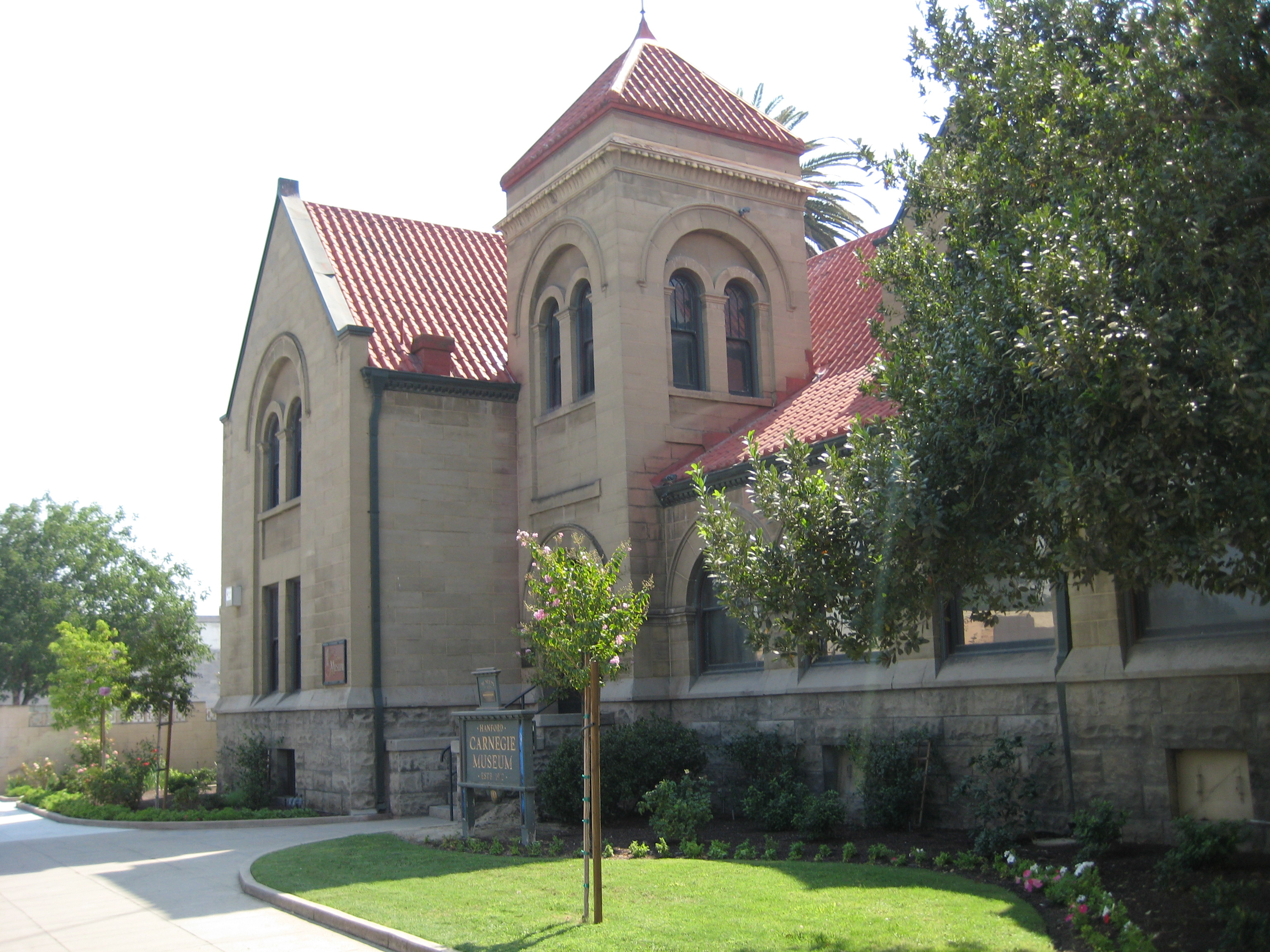
- Hanford Carnegie Museum

- Location within California Location within the United States
- Location: 109 E. 8th St. Hanford, California
- Coordinates: 36°19′39.3″N 119°38′43.4″W
- Built: 1905
- Architect: McDougall Brothers, Benjamin & George
- Architectural style: Romanesque Revival, Richardson Romanesque
- NRHP reference No.: 81000152
- Added to NRHP: December 17, 1981

The Carnegie Museum of Kings County, is a museum in Hanford, Kings County, central California.

== History ==
The building was built in 1905 in the Romanesque Revival style with Richardson Romanesque elements. It was one of the many Carnegie libraries that were funded by steel magnate Andrew Carnegie, who awarded the city $12,500 to construct it.

The Hanford Library was open in the Carnegie building until 1968, when the city and Kings County libraries were combined and moved into a new building. Local citizens raised the money to save the old library building from destruction and to renovate it.

== Museum ==
The Hanford Carnegie Museum opened in the restored Carnegie Library building in 1974. In 2021, the Museum name was changed to The Carnegie Museum of Kings County, to reflect the Museum intent to present a larger community history. The history museum has displays of Kings County's people and institutions, to illustrate and explain the history of King's County and the area in the western San Joaquin Valley.

== See also ==
- List of Carnegie libraries in California
- National Register of Historic Places listings in Kings County, California
