= Colton Carnegie Library =

- Carnegie Public Library Building
- U.S. National Register of Historic Places
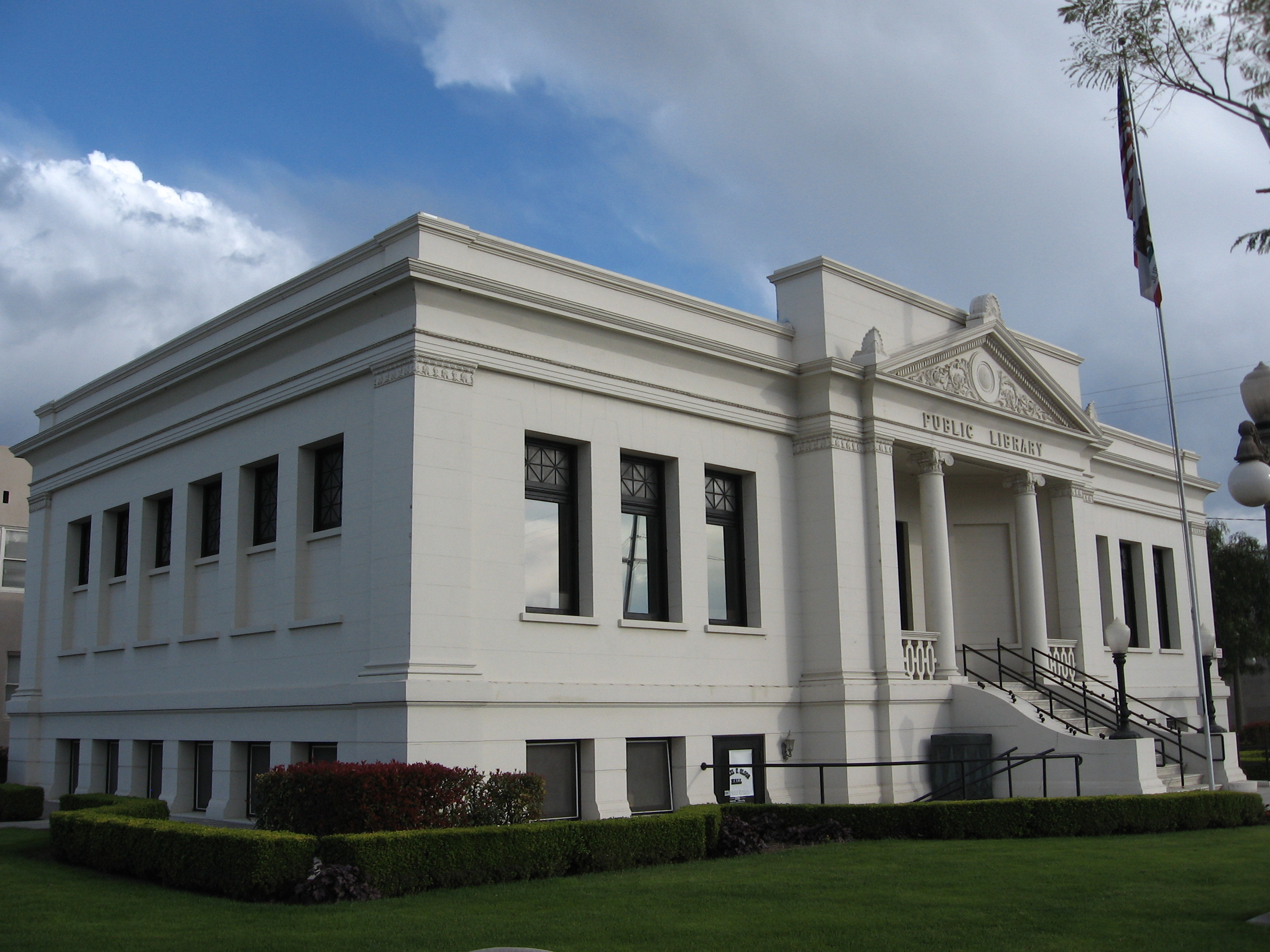

- Location within California Location within the United States
- Location: 380 N. La Cadena Dr., Colton, California
- Coordinates: 34°4′8″N 117°19′22″W
- Area: 0.3 acres (0.12 ha)
- Built: 1908
- Built by: Kaiser & Loomis
- Architect: Burnham, Franklin P.
- Architectural style: Classical Revival
- NRHP reference No.: 88000894
- Added to NRHP: June 23, 1988

The Colton Carnegie Library is a Carnegie library located at 380 North La Cadena Drive in Colton, California. The library was built in 1908 through a $10,000 grant from the Carnegie Foundation. Architect Franklin P. Burnham designed the Neoclassical building, the only example of the style in Colton. The building features an entrance portico supported by Ionic columns, a frieze and ornamented pediment above the entrance, and pilasters at the corners. In addition to housing the city's collection of over 1,000 books, the library hosted community meetings and social groups and even served as a church. The library moved to a larger building in 1982, and the building now houses the Colton Area Museum.

The building was added to the National Register of Historic Places on June 3, 1988.
