= Carnegie Art Museum =

Public art museum in Oxnard, California

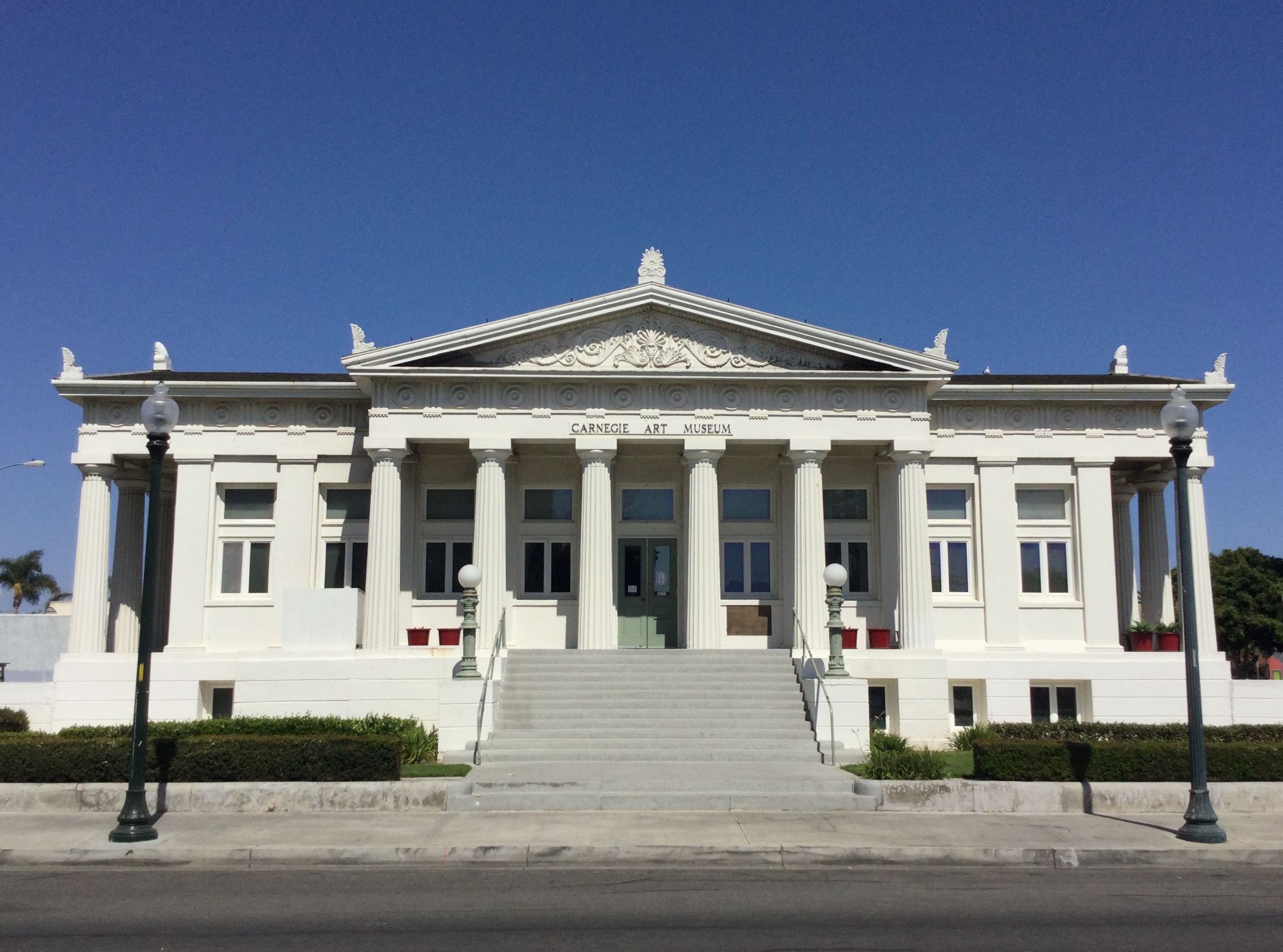
- The front facade
- Established: 1986
- Owners: City of Oxnard
- Oxnard Public Library
- U.S. National Register of Historic Places
- Location within California Location within the United States
- Location: 424 S. C St., Oxnard, California
- Coordinates: 34°11′54″N 119°10′48″W
- Built: 1907
- Architect: Franklin P. Burnham
- Architectural style: Neo-Classical
- NRHP reference No.: 71000210
- Added to NRHP: July 27, 1971

The Carnegie Art Museum was a public art museum owned by the City of Oxnard, California in the building originally occupied by the Oxnard Public Library. The Neo-Classical building, located adjacent to Oxnard's Plaza Park, opened in 1907 as the Oxnard Public Library and was converted into an art museum in 1986. In July 1971, it became the first building in Ventura County and the first Carnegie library in California to be listed on the National Register of Historic Places.

The museum closed in 2019.

== Construction and early history ==
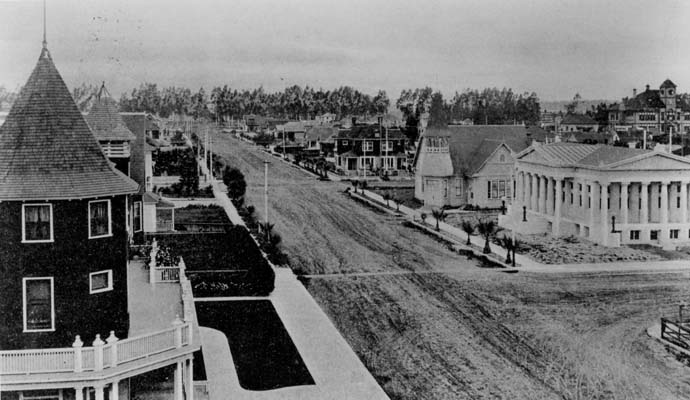
Downtown Oxnard in 1908, Oxnard Public Library on the right

In late 1904 Oxnard's first mayor, Richard B. Haydock, wrote a letter to Andrew Carnegie soliciting a donation to build a library in Oxnard. In February 1906, Carnegie offered to donate $10,000 toward the construction of a library if the City of Oxnard would furnish the site and agree to provide at least $1,000 per year to maintain it.

By September 1906, construction was underway. Mayor Haydock selected the Greek Neo-Classical architecture with Doric columns for the new library, which was designed by Los Angeles architect Franklin Burnham.

Carnegie initially gave $10,000 toward construction of the library, but as the plans were drawn, the city decided to build a more expensive building that could also house the city's municipal offices and city hall. In July 1906, the city signed a contract with Thomas Carroll for $14,000 to build the dual-use facility. Carnegie agreed to pay half of the additional appropriation in addition to the original $10,000 gift. The final cost was $14,000 with Carnegie contributing $12,000 and the city contributing $2,000. The main floor was occupied by the library, and the basement was Oxnard's city hall.

The library was opened on May 16, 1907. Five years later, Oxnard's library had "the largest circulation of any city of the sixth class in the State."

In 1923, the library was expanded with the opening of a new three-story addition on the east side of the building, allowing the library to expand its holdings to 20,000 books.

== Later uses ==
The structure continued to serve as Oxnard's city hall until 1949 and as the Oxnard Public Library until 1963.

In March 1963, the Oxnard Public Library moved to a new location, and the building was used between 1963 and 1975 by the Oxnard Convention and Visitors Bureau and the Chamber of Commerce.

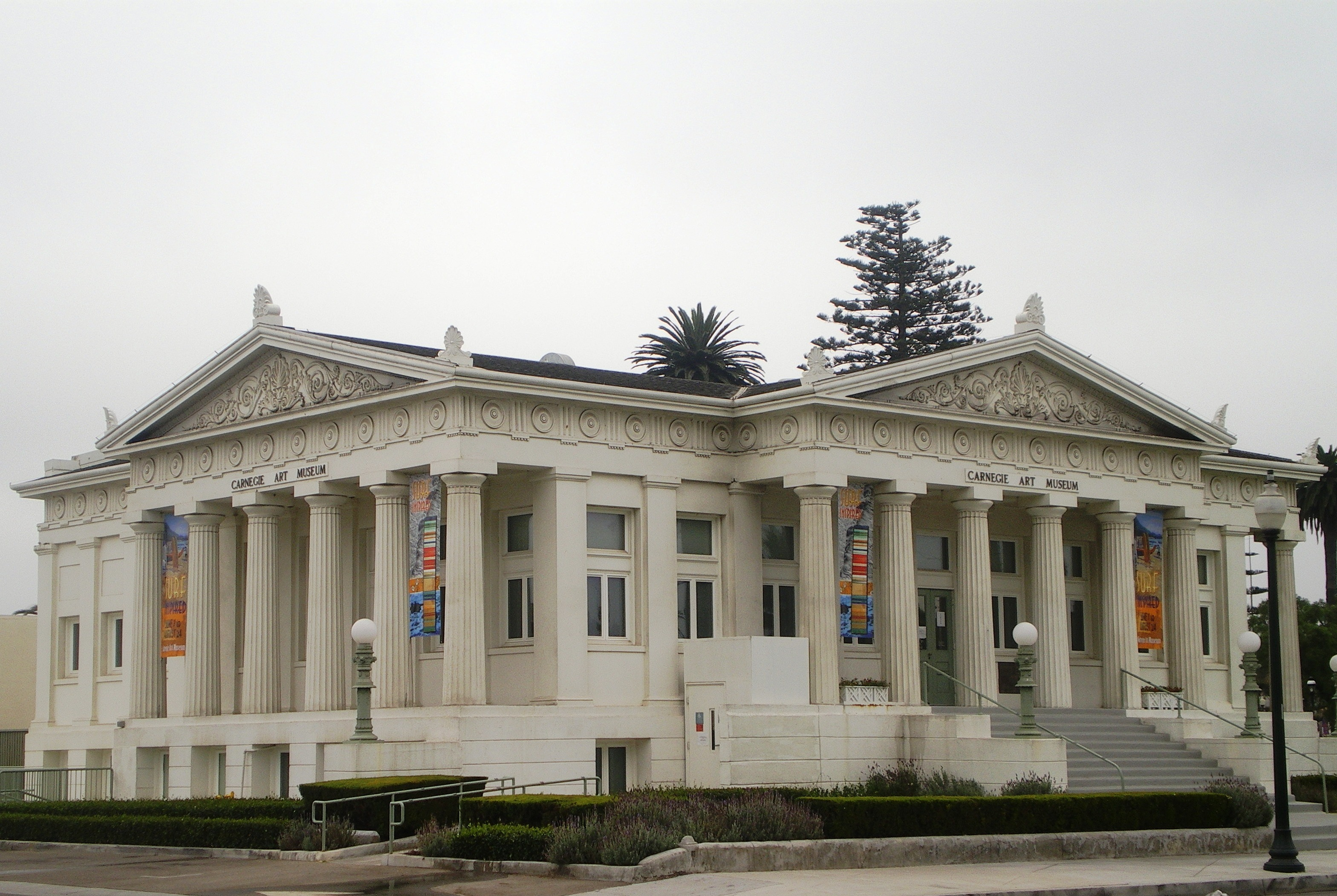
Two of the structure's three neoclassical facades

In 1977, the city received a $133,000 federal grant to restore the building, which re-opened on August 16, 1980, as the Carnegie Cultural Arts Center, which was the home of the Art Club of Oxnard, the Oxnard Historical Society Museum and the audiovisual portion of the Oxnard Public Library.

In 1986, the building became the Carnegie Art Museum, owned and operated by the City of Oxnard. The museum had 37,000 visitors in 2002. It has hosted exhibitions by Southern California artists, including Michael Dvortcsak, Joyce Trieman, Frank Romero and Gronk. The Museum also has a permanent collection of more than 1,500 art and ethnographic objects, including over 600 paintings, drawings, prints and photographs primarily by 20th century California artists such as Arthur Beaumont, Colin Campbell Cooper, Millard Sheets, and Leo Politi.

In 2019 the city considered laying off the employees at the museum and at the Oxnard Performing Arts Center and shuttering both facilities. At that time, city officials stated the closure was temporary and the museum could reopen when new downtown development began, which was expected within about three years.

== Historic designation ==
In February 1971, the Ventura County Cultural Heritage Board listed the building as a heritage landmark.

In July 1971, the building was added to the National Register of Historic Places, becoming the first site so designated in Ventura County.

== In popular culture ==
It also served as a facade for the Dan August television show starring Burt Reynolds in the early 1970s.

== See also ==
- List of Registered Historic Places in Ventura County, California
- Ventura County Historic Landmarks & Points of Interest
