= Oroville Carnegie Library =

- U.S. National Register of Historic Places
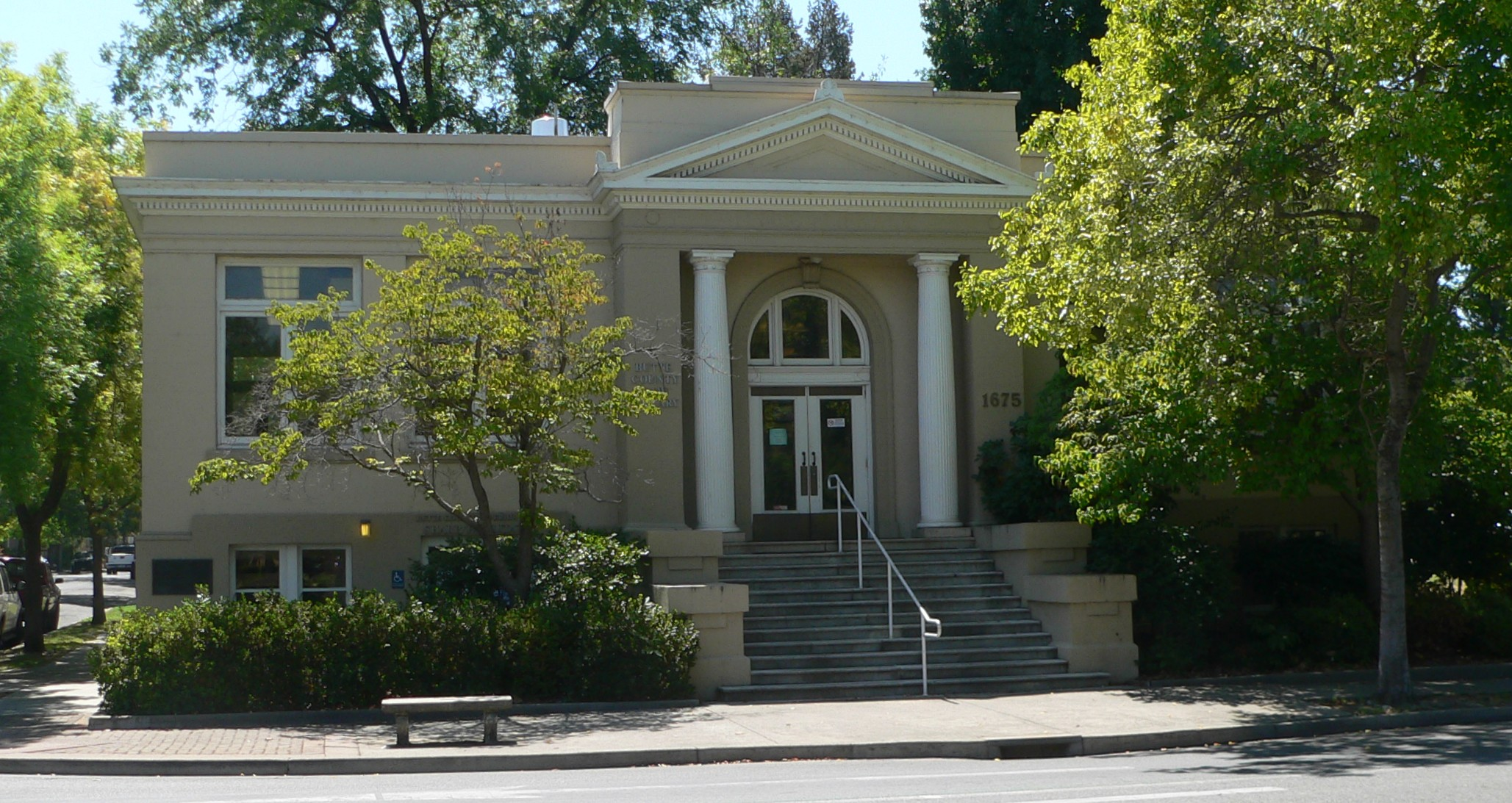

- Location within California
- Location: 1675 Montgomery St., Oroville, California
- Coordinates: 39.512724°N 121.558904°W
- Area: less than one acre
- Built: 1912
- Architect: William Henry Weeks
- Architectural style: Classical Revival
- MPS: California Carnegie Libraries MPS
- NRHP reference No.: 07000405
- Added to NRHP: May 8, 2007

The Oroville Carnegie Library, at 1675 Montgomery St. in Oroville, California, was built in 1912. It was listed on the National Register of Historic Places in 2007.

It is a two-story Carnegie library designed by architect William Henry Weeks in Classical Revival style.

It is now the Butte County Public Law Library
