= Sacramento Public Library =

Library system in Sacramento, California, United States

- 38°34′54.3″N 121°29′42.5″W
- Location: Sacramento, California, United States
- Established: 1857
- Branches: 28

Collection
- Size: 2 million

Access and use
- Circulation: 7,732,460
- Population served: 1.4 million
- Members: 720,073

Other information
- Budget: $60,617,000
- Director: Peter Coyl
- Employees: 319
- Parent organization: Sacramento Public Library Authority
- Website: saclibrary.org

Sacramento Public Library is a public library system in Sacramento, California. With nearly 2 million items, it is the fourth largest library system in California.

== History ==
=== Founding ===
The Sacramento Library Association was established in October 1857 as a public subscription library, and its first roster listed many prominent citizens, including E. B. Crocker, C. P. Huntington, and Leland Stanford. In 1872, the association acquired a building on I Street between 7th and 8th and furnished a library on the first floor.[2] By 1879, the Library Association was facing financial difficulties and offered to transfer ownership to the City of Sacramento on the condition that it be made free. The proposal was brought to a vote in the March elections and passed. The Sacramento Free Public Library opened to the public on Saturday, June 14, 1879, with a collection of 5,695 books.

=== 1918 Carnegie Library Building ===
By 1913, the Sacramento City Library collection had expanded to fill the 5,763 sq. ft. main library at 716 I Street, and the Sacramento Veteran Knights of Pythias applied to the Carnegie Corporation for the building of a new city library at the corner of 9th and I Streets. After some debate, the Carnegie Corporation approved $100,000 toward a new building and the City of Sacramento pitched in an additional $30,000. The library would be designed by San Francisco architect Loring P. Rixford, whose plans for an Italian Renaissance edifice were chosen from among 56 drawings submitted by architects throughout the Pacific Coast region in a competition conducted under the rules of the American Institute of Architects. The new Sacramento Free Public Library opened to the public at 828 I Street on April 23, 1918. The building was added to the National Register of Historic Places in 1992.

=== County Library Service ===
Under the leadership of Director Lauren W. Ripley, Sacramento Free Public Library reached an agreement with the Board of Supervisors of the County of Sacramento in 1908 to become the first city library in the state of California to extend free service to county residents. The library established the first county deposit station in Elk Grove on October 19, 1908, and by early 1909, had deposit stations at Courtland, Fair Oaks, Folsom, Galt, Oak Park, Sutterville and Vorden.

A separate Sacramento County Library system was established in 1919 and the next year began serving all of Sacramento County, excepting city residents. The two library systems would remain separate until a July 1966 agreement between the City and County of Sacramento combined their service, unifying them under the management of the City Librarian (henceforth known as the City-County Librarian) as the Sacramento City-County Library.

On August 31, 1993, the Sacramento City Council and Sacramento County Board of Supervisors voted to initiate a joint powers authority to merge all operations of the Sacramento City-County Library, including budgeting and personnel. Today, the Sacramento Public Library Authority is governed by a Joint Exercise of Powers Agreement between the County of Sacramento and the Cities of Citrus Heights, Galt, Isleton, Elk Grove, Rancho Cordova, and Sacramento. Although it is located in the county of Sacramento, the city of Folsom is excluded from the agreement and is instead served by the Folsom Public Library. The purpose of the Sacramento Public Library Authority is to provide public library services that provide open access to diverse resources and ideas that inspire learning, promote reading, and enhance community life to all citizens in its member jurisdictions.

=== Fraud and Grand Jury Investigation ===
In 2008, a library employee, his wife, and a subcontractor successfully perpetuated a scheme to defraud the Library in $650,000 from fraudulent billing. A subsequent Grand Jury Investigation criticized "how the board and the library administration handle supervision, communication, and accountability" and according to one report, it recommended the Library Director be removed. Subsequently, the Library Director resigned with a payment of $25,000 and a promise not to pursue legal action. Rivkah Sass (who had previously been named Librarian of the Year by the Library Journal in 2006) became Library Director on August 24, 2009.

=== Development ===
In 2011, U.S. Congresswoman Doris Matsui commented that, "The Sacramento Public Library continues to establish itself as a leader in the region, and as a model for other systems." Later that year, Sacramento Public Library became one of 53 places in the world to have an Espresso Book Machine. The machine, referred to as the "I Street Press" is no longer functional.

As of 2015, the Sacramento Public Library began to stock general materials that community members may need to borrow, such as projectors, instruments, sewing machines, and other similar items in order to offer better services to the community and to draw in larger populations from the area. The cake pan library was added later in 2021.

In 2019 the Sacramento Public Library was awarded that years Jerry Kline Community Impact Prize awarded by Library Journal and the Gerald M. Kline Family Foundation. Two years later it was an honorable mention for the Library of the Year Award by Gale Cengage and Library Journal. After a 12-year career, Rivkah Sass, hired in 2009 who is "widely credited with transforming the region’s library system from a dysfunctional organization under investigation by the Sacramento County grand jury to one of the nation’s finest" retired. Her replacement, announced on December 10, 2022, was Peter Coyl, a Sacramento native who received his first library card at the Arcade Branch library in the 1980s.

Several branches are being actively renovated and/or updated. There is also a strong grassroots effort from the Oak Park neighborhood from residents advocating for a branch in their historically Black neighborhood. The Japanese American community has advocated for Japanese language materials to be added to the library's collection. Both efforts have been unsuccessful as of 2026.

== Branches ==
Sacramento Public Library has 28 branches:

- Arcade Library
- Arden-Dimick Library
- Carmichael Library
- Central Library
- Colonial Heights Library
- Belle Cooledge Library
- Courtland Library
- Del Paso Heights Library
- Elk Grove Library
- Fair Oaks Library
- Franklin Library
- Galt-Marian O. Lawrence Library
- Isleton Library
- Martin Luther King Jr. Library
- Ella K. McClatchy Library
- McKinley Library
- North Highland-Antelope Library
- North Natomas Library
- North Sacramento-Hagginwood Library
- Orangevale Library
- Rancho Cordova Library
- Rio Linda Library
- Robbie Waters Pocket-Greenhaven Library
- South Natomas Library
- Southgate Library
- Sylvan Oaks Library
- Valley Hi-North Laguna Library
- Walnut Grove Library
