= Lakeport Carnegie Library =

- U.S. National Register of Historic Places
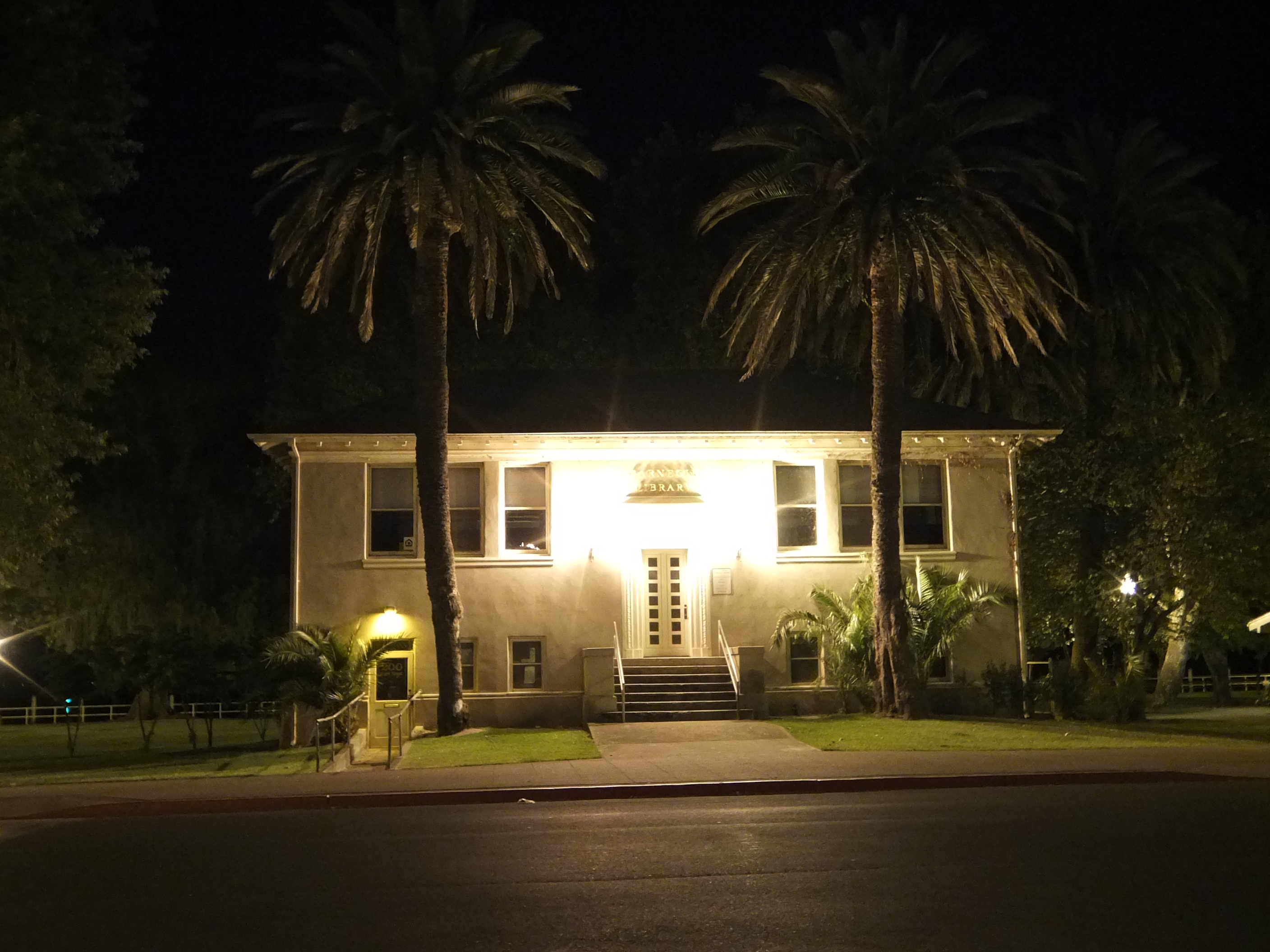
- The building at night

- Location within California Location within the United States
- Location: 200 Park St., Lakeport, California
- Coordinates: 39°2′34.54″N 122°54′50.2″W
- Area: 2.5 acres (1.0 ha)
- Built: 1918
- Architect: Ward & Blohme; Hinds & Randolf
- Architectural style: Classical Revival
- MPS: California Carnegie Libraries MPS
- NRHP reference No.: 08000261
- Added to NRHP: April 10, 2008

The Lakeport Carnegie Library is a Carnegie library located near the shore of Clear Lake in Lakeport, California.

Completed in 1918 in the Classical Revival type of architecture, it had been given an $8000 grant for its construction after local organizations like the Ladies' Improvement Club lobbied philanthropist Andrew Carnegie. The plans were drawn by Ward and Blohme and it was built by Hinds and Randolph. By December 1920 there were 4793 books in the library. In 1985 the library outgrew the building and moved to another location. The building was temporarily vacant, but now houses scientists from UC Davis who are conducting research on Clear Lake.
