= Gilroy Free Library =

- U.S. National Register of Historic Places
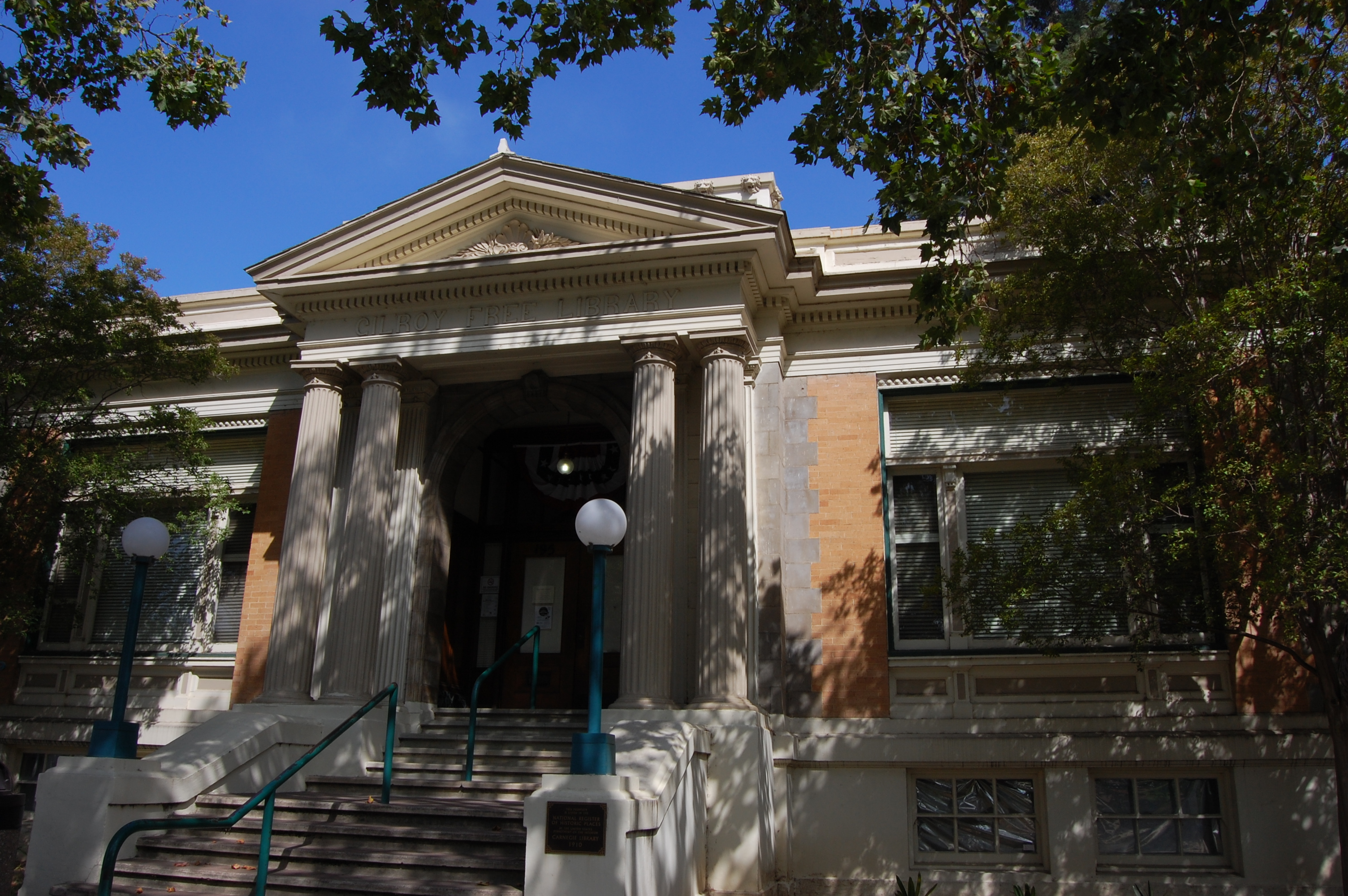
- Location: Gilroy, California
- Coordinates: 37.008293°N 121.571642°W
- Architect: William H. Weeks
- Architectural style: Classical Revival
- NRHP reference No.: 88000923
- Added to NRHP: 1988

The Gilroy Free Library is a Carnegie Library building in Gilroy, California. The building is now the location of the Gilroy Museum.

== History ==
The library was built using a $10,000 grant from Andrew Carnegie and completed in 1910. The library itself opened on July 27, 1910. In 1958 memorabilia and historical items were displayed in the remodeled basement which formally became the Gilroy Museum in 1963. In 1976 the library moved locations and the museum now occupies the entire building. In 1988 the building was added to the National Register of Historic Places.
