= Santa Cruz Museum of Natural History =

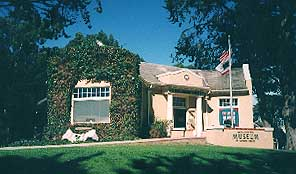
- Exterior of the museum
- Established: 1905
- Location: Santa Cruz, California
- Coordinates: 36.96470013852939°N 122.00922949249988°W
- Type: Natural History
- Visitors: 30,000 annually
- Director: Felicia Van Stolk
- Website: santacruzmuseum.org

The Santa Cruz Museum of Natural History is one of the earliest museums in the state of California. Founded from the Laura Hecox collection in 1905, the museum's collections grew extensively throughout the years, acquiring a number of Native American and archaeological artifacts, as well as natural history specimens. Currently, the museum is housed in a Carnegie Library, named after the Carnegie philanthropic foundation that funded the construction of the library in 1915.

== History ==
=== Founding ===
The museum traces its beginnings to the late 19th century and the collection of naturalist Laura Hecox. Miss Hecox was born in Santa Cruz in 1854 and from childhood had a keen interest in the natural sciences. Her parents, Adna and Margaret Hecox, traveled overland from Illinois to California in 1846 and settled in Santa Cruz the following year. In 1869, Mr. Hecox was appointed keeper of the original Santa Cruz Lighthouse and took up residence there with his wife and family. Young Laura soon began collecting seashells, minerals, fossils, Indian artifacts, and other specimens and curios, turning part of the lighthouse into a private nature museum. In 1883, Adna Hecox died and Laura Hecox was appointed lighthouse keeper by the federal government. She stayed at the post for thirty-three years. On weekends she gave public tours of the lighthouse including her personal natural history museum. Although interested in all of natural history, her specialty was mollusks. She corresponded with prominent scientists of the day and had at least two mollusk species named in her honor.

=== Carnegie Library ===
In 1904, Laura Hecox deeded her collection to the City of Santa Cruz for the establishment of its first public museum. The following year, the Hecox Museum opened in the basement of the new Carnegie Library, which was located on the site of the present Central Library. Dr. Charles Lewis Anderson, local physician and naturalist, served on the library Board of Trustees and played a key role in establishing both the library and museum. The museum opened August 21, 1905. There were displays of dried sea stars and crustaceans, Indian baskets and mortars, Eskimo artifacts, minerals, agates, gems, petrified woods, coral, bird nests and eggs, turtle and tortoise carapaces, and several cases of shells, including two hundred local species. In a short speech, Laura Hecox said that she did not feel that she was losing anything in giving the collection but rather was merely taking everyone else into partnership with her in the enjoyment of it. The Hecox collection remained at the library until about 1917 when it was moved to the new Santa Cruz High School.

In 1929, Humphrey Pilkington bequeathed his large collection of Indian artifacts to the City of Santa Cruz under the condition that a museum be established to store and display it. Pilkington was a forester and agriculturist and was the first warden at California Redwood Park, what is now called Big Basin Redwoods State Park.

=== Move to the Seabright neighborhood ===
The Crafts House, home of the museum from 1930 to 1954, was located behind the present museum where the amphitheater is now. The Santa Cruz Art League used the basement. In 1930, the Pilkington collection was set up at the Crafts House in Tyrrell Park in Santa Cruz's Seabright neighborhood. A volunteer Board of Trustees was appointed by the City Council, and they elected trustee Jed Scott as first curator. In 1932, through the efforts of Curator Scott, the Hecox collection joined the Pilkington collection in Seabright. During the 1930s and 1940s, the museum also maintained a public aquarium on the Santa Cruz Wharf.

In 1947, the Museum Commission was established to advise the Santa Cruz City Council on museum matters. This gave the museum formal legal status within city government and paved the way to someday expand and hire a staff.

In 1954, the old Crafts House was condemned and the museum moved next door to the Seabright Branch Library building, a Carnegie Library built in 1915. The joint Museum-Library opened October 10, 1954.

In 1960, Dr. Glenn Bradt was appointed to the Museum Commission. Bradt had a Ph.D. in mammalogy and was retired from the Michigan Department of Conservation. During his tenure as a nearly full-time Museum advocate and volunteer, two additions were built onto the old library building (in 1962 and 1968), all the exhibits were redone, and in 1969, the first full-time curator was hired. Bradt also forged ties between the museum and the new community college and university.

== Governance ==
In 1969 Charles Prentiss was hired as curator. He came to the job with a college background in both biology and art. During his twenty-nine years at the museum, programs, staff, collections, and exhibits continued to improve and expand. In the 1970s annual exhibits such as the Fungus Fair and Spring Wildflower Show were inaugurated and the first of many special exhibits held. Thanks to hundreds of donations during this period, the collection of specimens and artifacts grew to over 16,000 items. In 1978 the Santa Cruz Museum Association formed as the museum's non-profit membership arm. In 1980 the docent program began. Docents currently give tours to 6,000 school children each year. In 1981 the interior of the museum building was extensively remodeled and all new exhibits constructed. In 1982 the life-size gray whale model was built with funds raised by the Museum Association.

In 1998 Greg Moyce, with the title Museum Director, replaced retiring curator Charles Prentiss. Jenifer Lienau-Thompson joined the museum in 1998 as well, stepping into a lead role in 2005 when Moyce moved to Oregon to pursue a career in exhibit design. The museum celebrated its centennial in August of that year. Observing the popularity of the annual Illustrating Nature exhibit, she instituted a program of hosting additional temporary exhibits at the museum each year, on topics as wide-ranging as renewable energy, caves, water use, and bird migration; she collaborated with a local elementary school to create an exhibit on the threat to birds posed by plastic refuse left on beaches. She was named museum director in 2008, serving until February 2009.

In 2009, to avert closure due to lack of funding, the City of Santa Cruz entered an agreement to turn over operation of the museum to its long-time non-profit partner, the Santa Cruz Museum Association. In late 2010, the Museum Association board hired its first executive director of the fledgling non-profit museum. Dr. Daniel Harder was a botanist and had been the former director of the UCSC Arboretum. In November 2012, the Museum Association changed its name to the Santa Cruz Museum of Natural History to more clearly align the organization with the museum and make a clear separation from the previous City management. Dr. Harder continued in his role until the summer of 2014.

In early 2015, Heather Moffat was hired as executive director. Moffat is a paleontologist and museum educator. Prior to joining the museum team, she was the Director of Education and Exhibits for the Santa Barbara Museum of Natural History and its Sea Center. . Moffat's tenure at the Santa Cruz Museum of Natural History continued through the fall of 2018.

In the fall of 2019, after a yearlong search, the board of directors was excited to recognize one of the local emerging leaders in the region and decided to make a promotion from within the organization. After years as the museum's Education Director, Felicia Van Stolk was appointed as executive director. Director Van Stolk looks forward to building on the museum's recent successes increasing scientific literacy and appreciation of the natural world among local residents and visitors alike. Van Stolk said. “It’s an exciting time to work at the museum as we expand our programs to serve a more diverse population and become a regional leader in environmental education." Through the creation of innovative new exhibit experiences and further strengthening of nature-based education programs, the museum continues to deepen visitors’ experiences to help them each construct a personal understanding of the natural world and their role in it.

== Surfing museum addition ==
In 1984 the museum built outdoor exhibit kiosks on the Santa Cruz Wharf featuring marine life, fishing, and the wharf's history. In 1986 the Santa Cruz Surfing Museum was established as a satellite facility at the Mark Abbott Memorial Lighthouse. The displays of old surfboards and historical photographs attract 70,000 visitors each year. The City of Santa Cruz operates the Santa Cruz Surfing Museum.
