= Franklin Pierce Burnham =

American architect (1853–1909)

- Born: Franklin Pierce Burnham; October 30, 1853; Rockford, Illinois
- Died: December 16, 1909 (aged 56); South Pasadena, California
- Occupation: Architect
- Buildings: Georgia State Capitol
- Projects: Kenilworth, Illinois

Franklin Pierce Burnham (October 30, 1853 – December 16, 1909) was an American architect. He is best known for his collaborations with Willoughby J. Edbrooke, especially the 1889 Georgia State Capitol. Burnham was also named the Kenilworth Company Architect for Kenilworth, Illinois, and designed several of the planned community's original structures.

After 1903, Burnham focused his works on California, including a series of twelve Carnegie libraries. Five of his buildings are today recognized by the National Park Service on the National Register of Historic Places, including the Georgia State Capitol, a National Historic Landmark.

== Biography ==
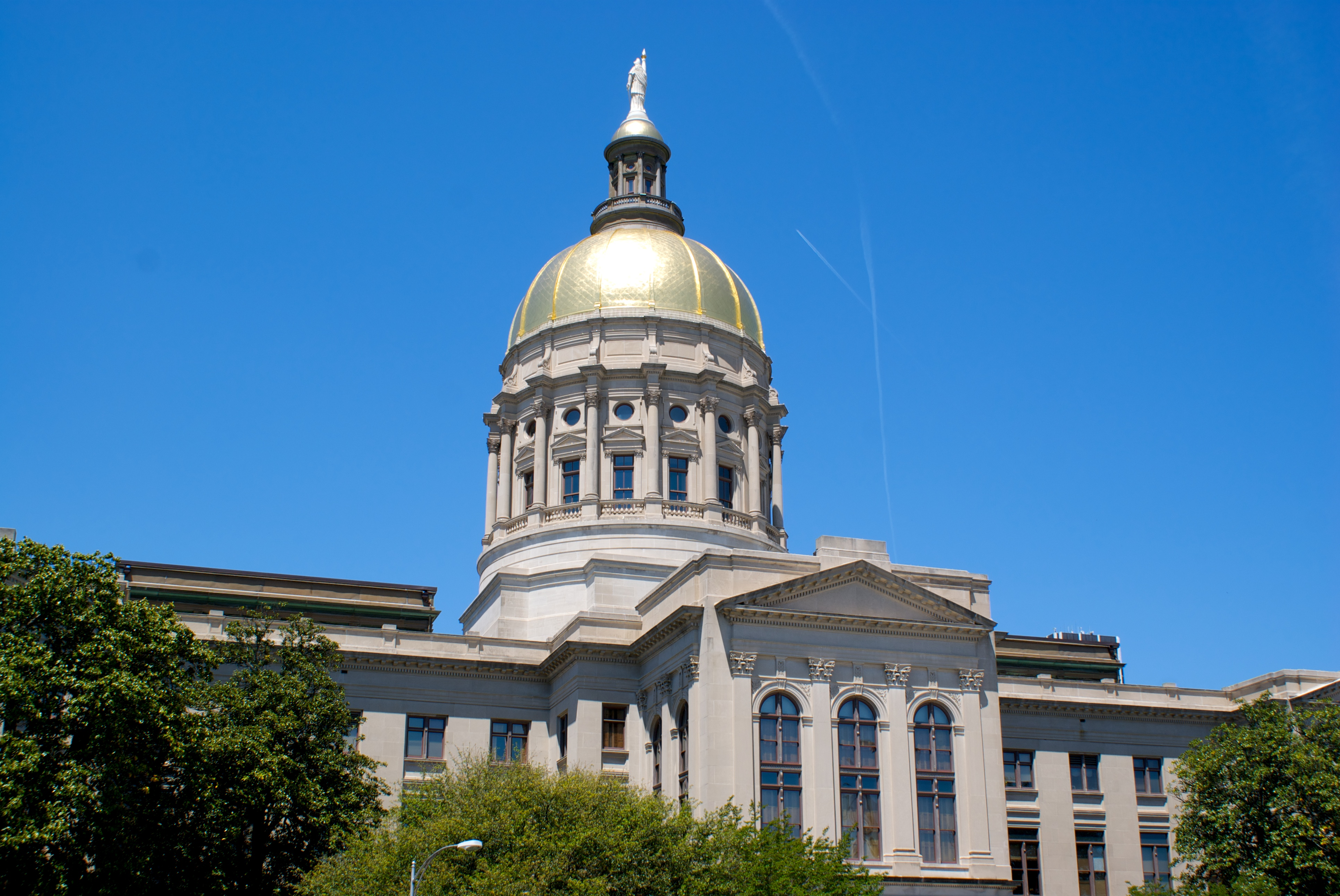
The Georgia State Capitol, perhaps Burnham's most notable commission

Franklin Pierce Burnham was born in Rockford, Illinois, on October 30, 1853, to Paul and Sarah J. Burnham. Burnham is of no relation to fellow Chicago architect Daniel Burnham. He was the youngest of their five children, and the only one born in Illinois. Paul Burnham was a carpenter, which probably influenced Franklin's future profession. Franklin Burnham was educated at Old Moseley School in Chicago before working in the architectural offices of J. H. Barrows when he was fourteen.

On January 29, 1877, Burnham married Adelia S. Milliken. After the marriage, the couple moved to San Francisco, where Burnham planned to open a new practice. One of his commissions, with Chicago architect Willoughby J. Edbrooke, was for the Wesley Avenue School at the University of Notre Dame in 1879. Burnham's first son, John Paul, was born in 1883.

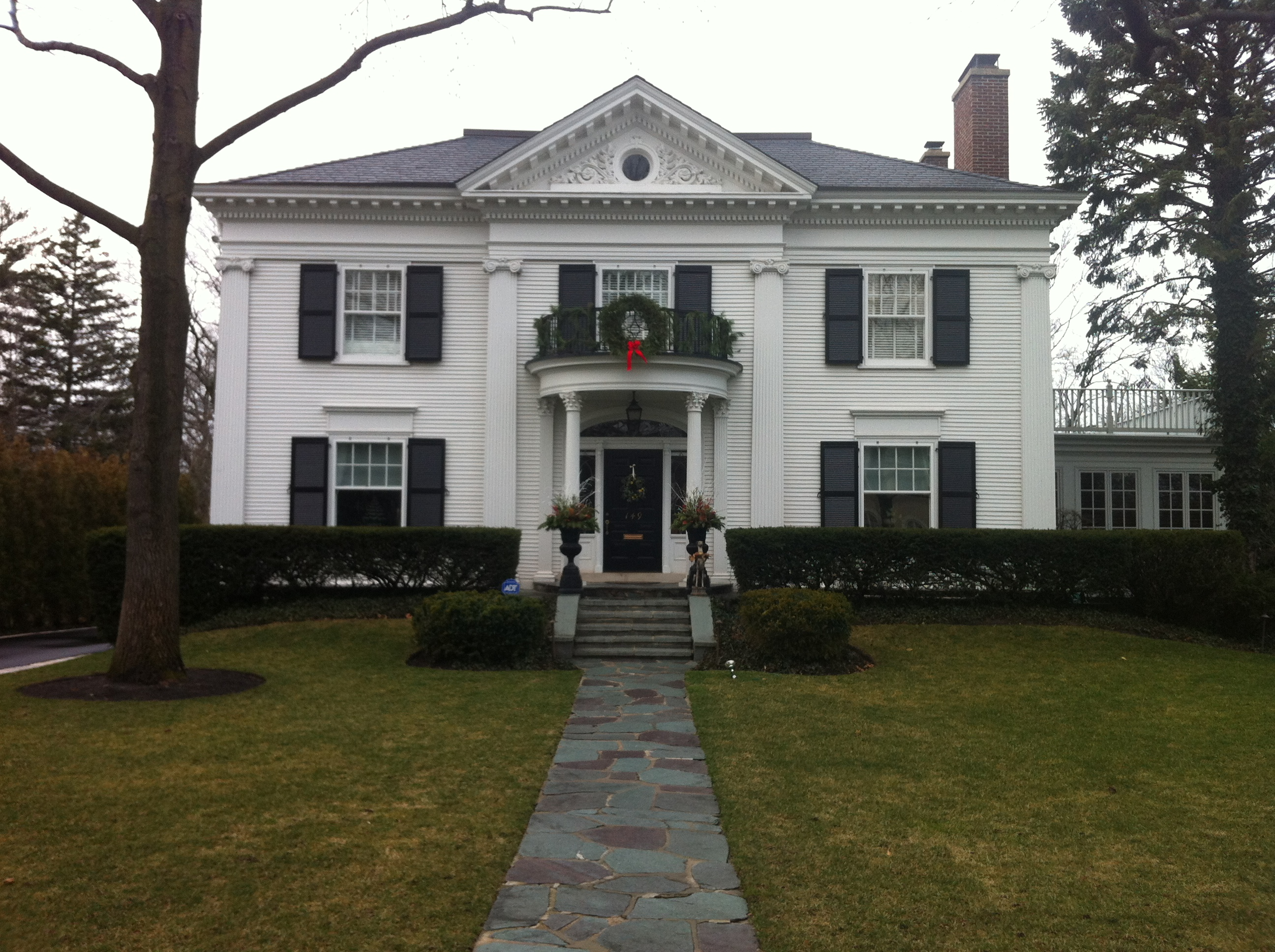
The O'Grady House, one of Burnham's buildings in Kenilworth

At some point around 1887, the Burnhams returned to Chicago. He established a working relationship with Edbrooke in the Chamber of Commerce Building. Burnham was the chief designer while Edbrooke oversaw general management. They designed residences in Evanston, Chicago, and Kansas City. They were also commissioned by YMCA to design a building in Atlanta for $100,000.

It was in Atlanta that Edbrooke & Burnham received their most notable commission a few years later—the Georgia State Capitol. A national competition was held for the building, which had to only use materials from Georgia. The Renaissance and Classical Revival design submitted by Edbrooke & Burnham was announced as the winner, and the cornerstone was dedicated on September 2, 1885. The building was completed in June 1889 for $998,157, in line with the $1 million budget. In 1974, the Georgia State Capitol became the forty-third National Historic Landmark in the state. Edbrooke & Burnham's 7th District Police Station, built in Chicago in 1888, was listed on the National Register of Historic Places (NRHP) in 1996.

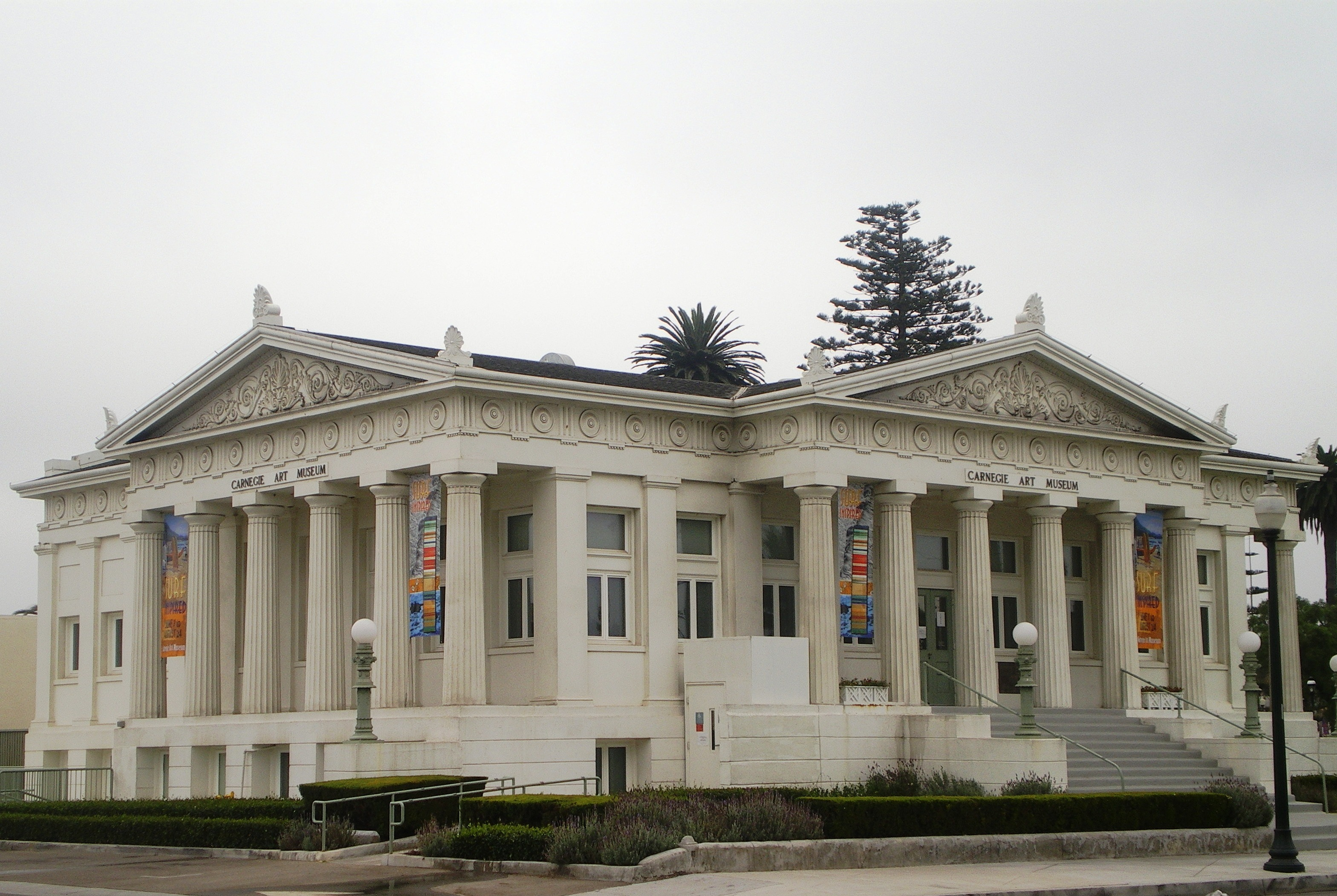
The Oxnard Carnegie library

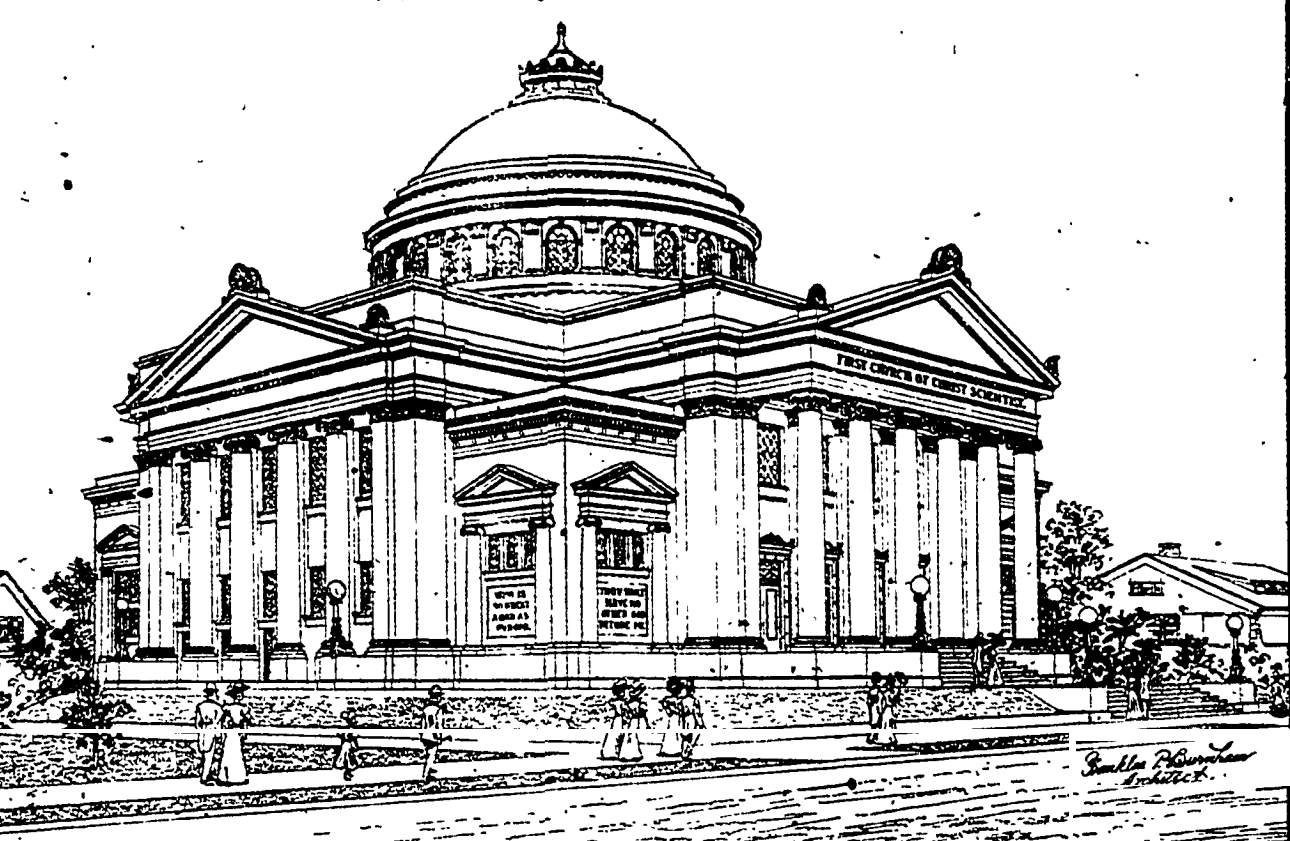
A Burnham drawing for Christian Science church in Pasadena, 1908

In 1889, Burnham was independently appointed the Kenilworth Company Architect. Kenilworth, Illinois was a planned community by Joseph Sears, who sought to develop a Chicago suburb with large lots and high standards of construction. He designed several residences, a train station, and a church for the town. The Mr. J. William de Coursey O'Grady House at 149 Kenilworth Avenue was listed on the NRHP in 2008. Burnham lived in one of his Kenilworth houses at 37 Kenilworth Avenue.

Burnham assumed all responsibility for the practice after Edbrooke was appointed Supervising Architect of the Treasury in 1891. In 1892, the firm designed the Kane County Courthouse in Geneva, Illinois. One of the pair's last major commissions was for the Mecca Flats in Chicago. The apartment building held almost five hundred residents, and was designed in an unusual U-shape that allowed for a central courtyard. This courtyard design became the template for Chicago apartment design over the next few decades.

Burnham contributed the Cold Storage Warehouse for the 1893 World's Columbian Exposition. The partnership officially ended upon the death of Edbrooke in 1896. Burnham returned to California in 1898 to again open an independent practice.

Back in California, Burnham focused his practice on designing Carnegie libraries. He designed twelve libraries: nine on his own, and three as part of the firm of Burnham & Bliesner. Only three are still standing, two of which are recognized by the NRHP. The library in Oxnard, now the Carnegie Art Museum, was listed in 1971. The Carnegie Public Library Building in Colton was listed in 1988.

In 1903, Burnham was commissioned to design the Riverside County Courthouse in Riverside. He designed San Diego's first skyscraper, the twelve-story First National Bank of San Diego, in 1909. One of his last commissions was the First Church of Christ, Scientist in Pasadena.

Franklin Pierce Burnham died suddenly in California on December 16, 1909, while visiting a bank. At the time, he resided at 1945 La France Street in South Pasadena.
