= Vaca Valley and Clear Lake Railroad =

Overview
- Headquarters: Vacaville, California
- Locale: Elmira-Vacaville-Winters-Esparto-Rumsey, California
- Dates of operation: 1877–1988
- Successor: Northern Railway

Technical
- Track gauge: 4 ft 8 1/2 in (1,435 mm) standard gauge

The Vaca Valley and Clear Lake Railroad was a standard gauge railroad that operated at Vacaville, California in the late 19th century. The Vaca Valley Railroad was incorporated on April 12, 1869, to run a branch from the mainline of the California Pacific Railroad (later Southern Pacific Railroad's mainline between Sacramento and Oakland, CA) at Elmira to Rumsey.

The Vaca Valley Railroad ran 4.35 miles (7.0 km) from Elmira to Vacaville. In June 1869, the line was opened for service. The Vaca Valley was sold at the Solano County Sheriff's auction on September 17, 1870, but retained the same name. The railroad was then extended beyond Vacaville, reaching Winters on August 26, 1875.

In 1877, just 10 weeks after completing the track between Winters and Madison, the Vaca Valley Railroad became the Vaca Valley and Clear Lake Railroad.

In 1888, this railroad fell under control of Southern Pacific's subsidiary, the Northern Railway. By 1888, the Northern Railway extended the line northwest from Madison to Capay and Rumsey.

In 1895, sparks from a steam locomotive caused a massive fire to break out just northeast of Vacaville, with over 2,000 acres (8.1 km^{2}) of farmland being burned, and area ranging from 3.5 miles (5.6 km) long, and 2.5 miles (4.0 km) wide. Local farmers in the area would rush to the scene of the fire, and would eventually help extinguish it, along with evacuating farmers in the area.

In 1898, the line was operated by Southern Pacific (SP) and ran from the Cal-P Oakland-Sacramento mainline at Elmira to Rumsey. SP abandoned the track between Rumsey and Capay in 1934. The track between Rumsey and Esparto was removed in 1937. Passenger service continued between Elmira and Esparto until 1957.

The line between Winters and Vacaville, which ran parallel to the west side of Interstate 505, was abandoned in the 1970s, ending at the grocery warehouses just south of Midway Road/I-505 in Vacaville. The Vacaville Branch's last train operated in about 1985 and the line was removed to Elmira by the 1990s.

== Timeline ==
- July 27, 1868 California Pacific Railroad completes track from Vallejo – Elmira via Suisun. At Vallejo the Cal-P had a railroad ferry to San Francisco.
- August 10, 1868 California Pacific completes Elmira – Dixon track, and reaches Sacramento in 1869/1870.
- April 12, 1869 Vaca Valley Railroad incorporated in Vacaville to build line from California Pacific at Elmira to Vacaville.
- May 10, 1869 On the same day the last spike was driven at Promontory Point, Utah to complete the Central Pacific Railroad/Union Pacific Railroad, grading commenced on the Vaca Valley Railroad.
- June 7, 1869 Rails laid on Vaca Valley Railroad
- June 16, 1869 The first train of the Vaca Valley Railroad was operated
- June 21, 1869 track between Elmira and Vacaville (5 miles) placed into operation.
- August 26, 1875 track between Vacaville and Winters (Winter's) (10 miles) opened via Allendale.
- June 30, 1876 California Pacific Railroad sold to Central Pacific Railroad. Vaca Valley Railroad owns 19.5 miles of track.
- February 19, 1877 Vaca Valley Railroad continues northwest expansion towards Madison and is renamed the Vaca Valley & Clear Lake Railroad.
- May 1, 1877 track opened between Winters and Madison, a total of 27.4 miles from Elmira.
- May 15, 1888 Vaca Valley & Clear Lake RR merged into the Northern Railway, (a Southern Pacific Railroad subsidiary. Northern Railway was created on this date as a consolidation of several smaller railroads.
- July 1, 1888 Northern Railway opens 23.65 miles of track between Madison and Rumsey via Capay (Esparto).
- April 14, 1898 Northern Railway consolidated into Southern Pacific Railroad. Line is known as the Rumsey Branch of SP.
- April 15, 1934 SP abandons track between Rumsey and Capay.
- 1937 Track removed between Rumsey and Capay. Line becomes SP's Capay Branch.
- 1943 Track abandoned from Esparto – Capay. Line becomes SP's Esparto Branch.
- 1957 Last passenger train operated between Elmira and Esparto.
- March 7, 1975 Line abandoned between Vacaville – Esparto (ICC Fin Doc AB-12). Line becomes SP's Vacaville Branch.
- 1985 Last freight train operates on Vacaville Branch and Vacaville Branch abandoned between Elmira and Vacaville.

== Locomotives ==
These locomotives were listed on the Vaca Valley & Clear Lake Railroad's roster.

- No. 1 "Vacaville" was built by Vulcan Iron Works in May 1867 (Builder No. 9) and was a Type 2-2-4. It was sold to Union Coal Company in 1888 when the railroad was sold to SP's subsidiary, the Northern Railway.
- No. 2 "Ben Ely" was built by Baldwin Locomotive Works in July 1875 (Builder No. 3753) and was a Type 2-6-0 (Mogul). In 1888 the engine was renumbered Northern Railway #1022.

== Route ==
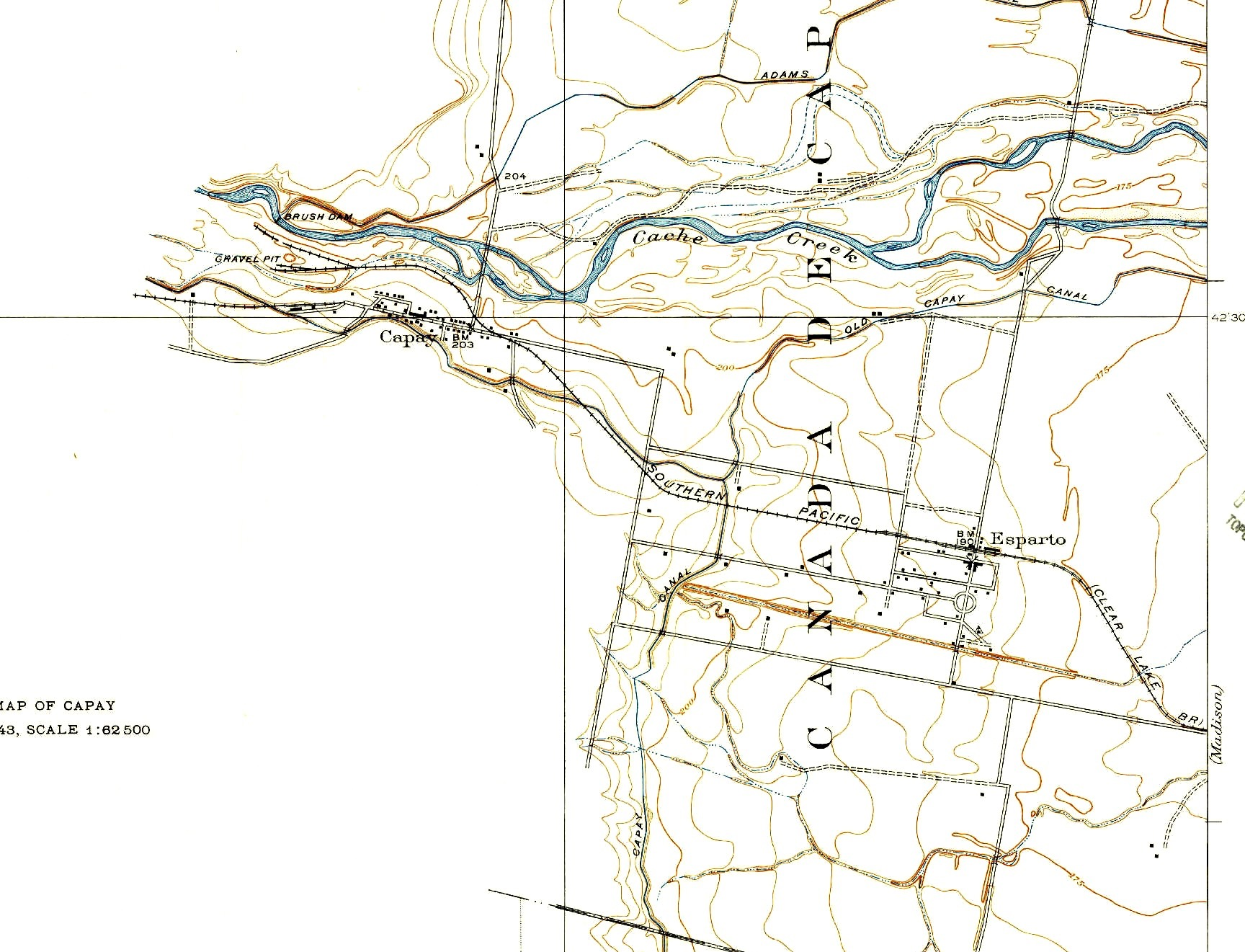
Rumsey Branch of SP in 1905 at Capay and Esparto

- Elmira (Depot) MP 59.62
- Vacaville (Depot)
- Vaca Valley (Allendale) MP 68.0
- Winters (Depot)
- Madison
- Esparto (Depot) MP 89.95
- Capay MP 92.79
- Rumsey MP 110.85

=== The abandoned grade ===
Traces of the abandoned grade can be found. From the Vacaville/Allendale area, the line crossed Midway Road on the west side of I-505 and ran north to Winters on the east side of Hartley Road. At Udell Road the line ran northbound on the east side of Winters Road. The trestle where the line crossed Putah Creek is on the east side of Winters Road. Present-day Railroad Ave in Winters was the old grade through town and continued north along the east side of Yolo County Road 89. At Madison near Highway 16 the railroad crossed 89 and ran on the east side of Railroad Street where it then turned west along Highway 16 towards Esparto. From there, Highway 16 generally follows the path (albeit with straighter curves) of the old railroad up to Rumsey. The railroad was originally planned to continue up the twisty route to Clearlake, but investment never came through. Each of the train stations still exist, and have been converted into residences (except for the Esparto one).
