= County Fire =

2018 wildfire in Northern California

- Part of the 2018 California wildfires
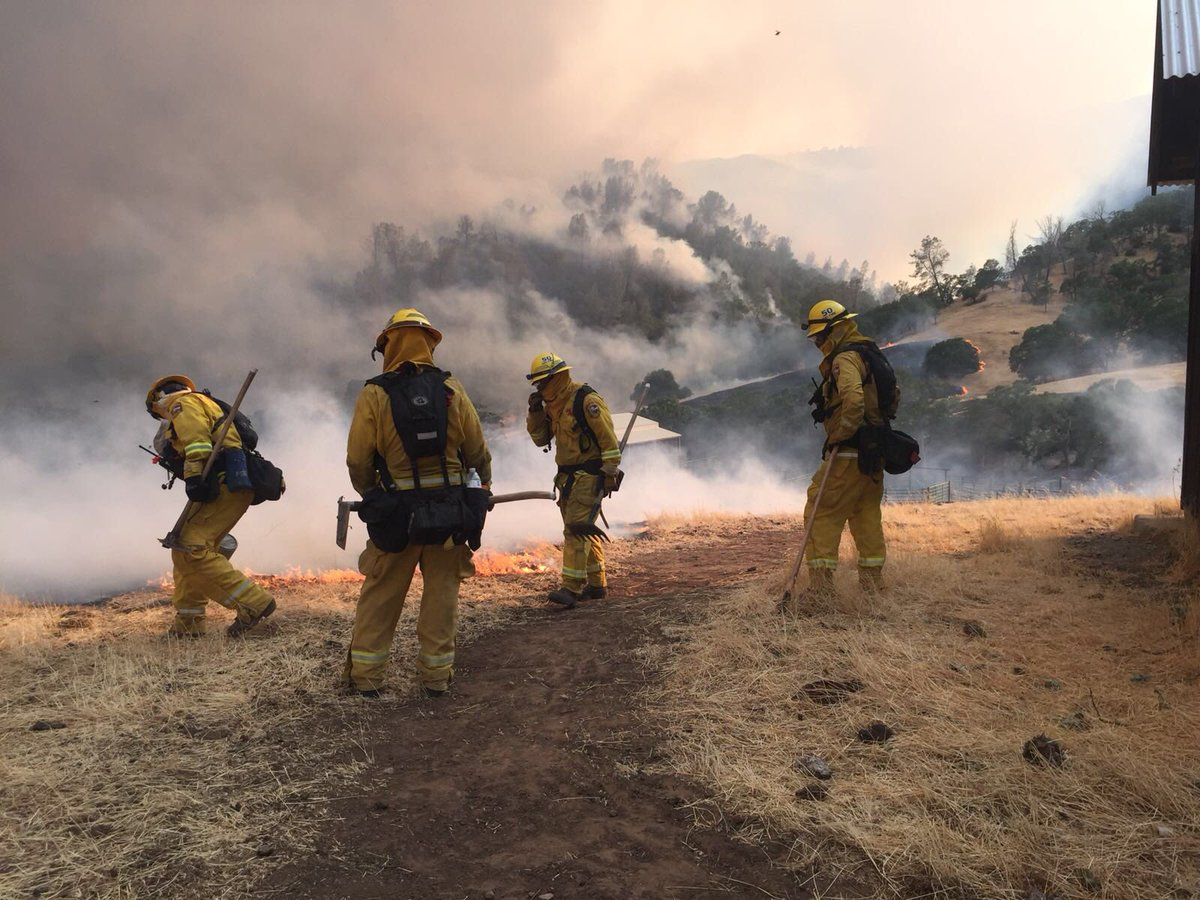
- Fire crews during the County Fire on July 1, 2018
- Date: June 30, 2018 –; July 17, 2018
- Location: Yolo County and Napa County, California, United States
- Coordinates: 38.80583°N 122.18183°W

Statistics
- Burned area: 90,288 acres (365 km^{2})

Impacts
- Deaths: None reported
- Injuries: 1 firefighter
- Structures lost: 20
- Cost: >$46.9 million (2018 USD)

Ignition
- Cause: Improperly installed electric livestock fence unit

Map
- Location of fire in California

The County Fire (formerly known as the Guinda Fire) was a wildfire east of Lake Berryessa in Yolo County and Napa County, California in the United States. The fire, first reported on June 30, 2018, in Rumsey Canyon in the community of Guinda, and was contained on July 17, 2018 after burning 90,288 acres (141 mi^{2}; 365 km^{2}). The fire caused mandatory evacuations along Highway 128, County Road 23, and areas around Lake Berryessa, including Monticello Dam. The fire destroyed 20 structures, damaged three, and caused one injury. The fire was started by an improperly installed electric fence for livestock.

== Progression ==
=== June ===
The County Fire was first reported at 2:12 pm on June 30, 2018 in vegetation alongside County Road 63 and Highway 16 in Rumsey Canyon in Guinda in Yolo County and a small part of Napa County in California. The fire was fueled by dry vegetation and was driven by red flag conditions, including high temperatures, gusty winds and low humidity. By the end of the day, the fire had burned 8,000 acres (32 km^{2}) and caused mandatory evacuations in the area.

=== July ===
By the morning of July 1, the County Fire was burning out of control and had grown to 16,500 acres (67 km^{2}), crossing the Yolo County and Napa County line, burning west of Woodland in a rural area near Lake Berryessa. Evacuation advisories were put in place for areas south of County Road 81 and west of County Road 85, as well as areas of Solano County, and additional mandatory evacuations were put in place. By the afternoon, the County Fire was 22,000 acres (89 km^{2}), at 0% containment. The evacuation center at the grange in Guinda was closed and a new evacuation center was open in Esparto. Additional evacuations were put in place for the areas around the Monticello Dam.

By the evening of July 1, the County Fire was at 32,500 acres (132 km^{2}), 2% containment, and threatened 116 structures. By the morning of July 2, the fire had grown to 44,500 acres (180 km^{2}). CAL FIRE stated that extreme fire behavior was still being observed. The fire continued expanding throughout the day. By the morning of July 3, the fire had burned an additional 10,000 acres (40 km^{2}), reaching 70,000 acres (283 km^{2}). Containment stayed at five percent, though firefighters continued setting up containment lines. On the Fourth of July, the fire had grown to threaten 1,500 structures and was 27 percent contained. Firefighters focused on building containment lines, with inaccessible terrain causing accessibility challenges for fire crews. By the evening, mandatory evacuations along Highway 16 and County Road 53 to Highway 128 were lifted.

During the evening of July 5, the County Fire was at 88,000 acres (356 km^{2}) and 33 percent containment. Damage inspections started while the fire activity was minimal. All evacuation advisories were lifted on July 5, and mandatory evacuations moved to areas west of Highway 16. Initial findings report nine buildings destroyed, however, by July 7, 10 buildings were reported destroyed and two damaged. All evacuated areas were reopened by July 10.

As of July 12, the fire has burned a total of 90,288 acres (365 km^{2}) and was 92 percent contained. In total, 20 buildings have been destroyed and three have been damaged. The fire was started by an improperly installed electric fence for livestock. The responsible party was cited under code 4421 for "burning of lands of another." The County Fire was declared contained on July 17, 2018.

== Effects ==
The County Fire burned in rural areas of Northern California, impacting primarily rural natural areas and areas with low populations.

=== Evacuations ===
Initial mandatory evacuations took place along county roads and areas west of Highway 16 in the Murphy Ranch area of Guinda. By July 1, the fire had spread into Napa County, specifically rural areas of Lake Berryessa, causing more mandatory evacuations, including the entire Lake Berryessa area north of Highway 128, including all homes around Monticello Dam. Additional areas that were evacuated due to the County Fire include Brooks, including members of the Yocha Dehe Wintun Nation.

=== Closures ===
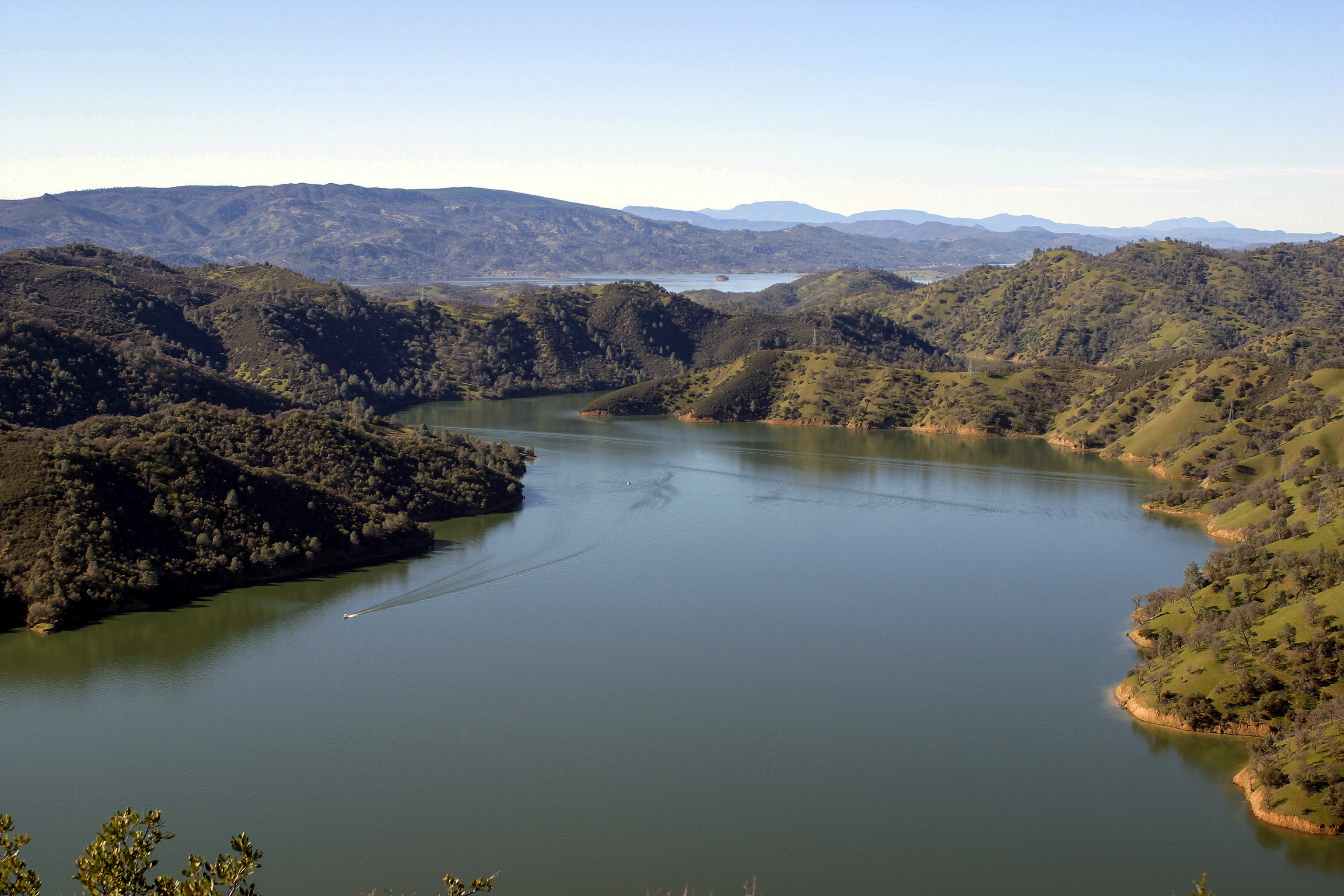
Areas surrounding Lake Berryessa were evacuated and closed during the County Fire, impacting residents and recreational areas.

Road closures began on July 1, primarily focused on county roads extending from Highway 128, including those reaching into Markley Resort. Pope Creek Bridge was also closed.

=== Economic ===
The fire impacted recreation areas on Lake Berryessa, including the Markley Cove and Pleasant Cove resorts. The properties were put under evacuation warnings, and access to the resorts was closed along Highway 128.

== Investigation ==
The cause of the fire remained unknown until July 11, when CAL FIRE reported that a livestock electric fence, which was improperly installed, was what had started the fire in Guinda. The individual(s) responsible were cited under Public Resource Code 4421 for "burning of lands of another."
