= Sand Fire (2019) =

2019 wildfire in Northern California

- Part of the 2019 California wildfires
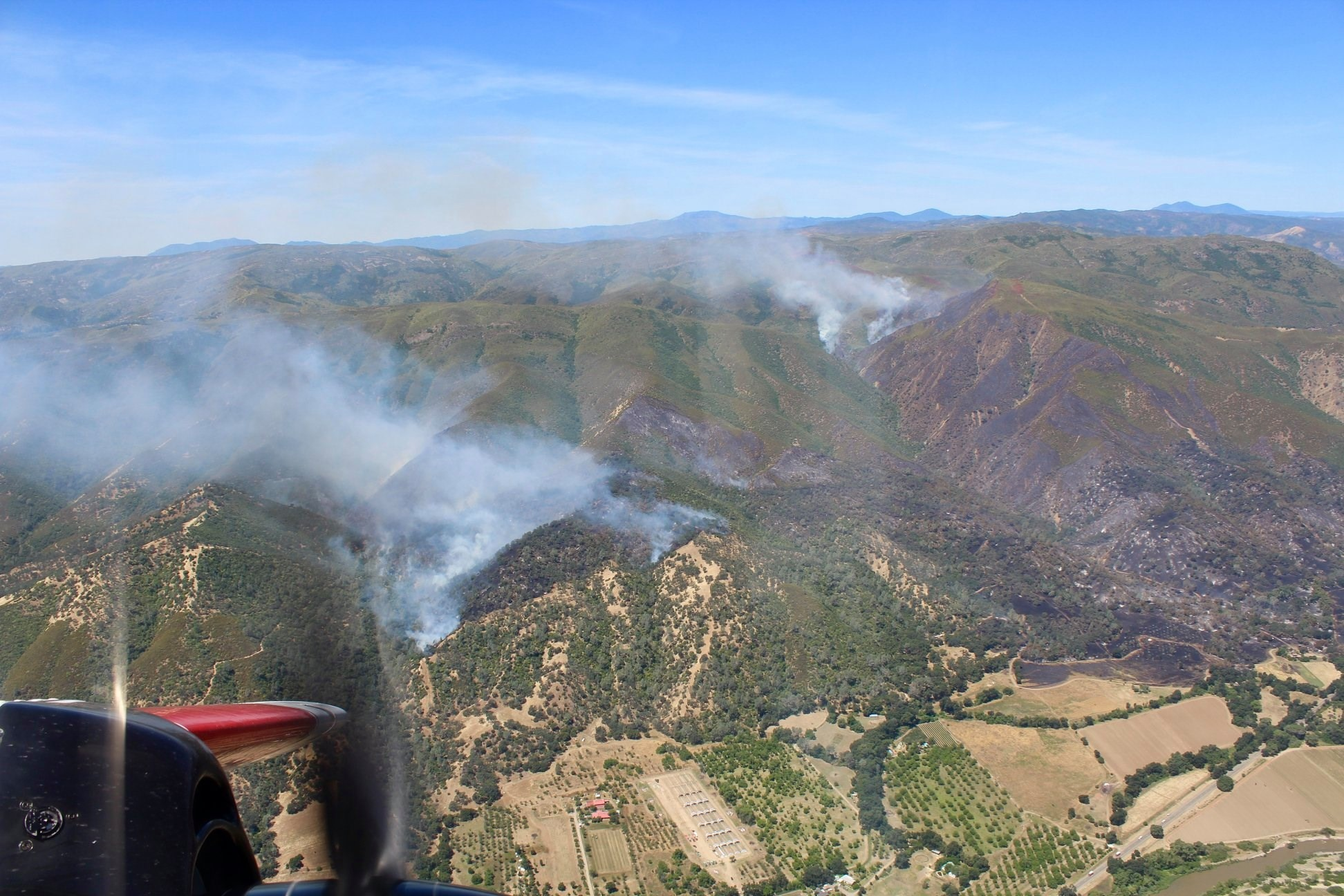
- Aerial photo of the Sand Fire on June 9, 2019
- Date: June 8, 2019 –; June 15, 2019
- Location: Guinda, Yolo County, California
- Coordinates: 38.88978°N 122.23922°W

Statistics
- Burned area: 2,512 acres (1,017 ha)

Impacts
- Injuries: 2
- Structures lost: 7

Ignition
- Cause: Under investigation

Map
- Location in California

The Sand Fire was a wildfire that burned in the area of Rumsey northwest of Guinda in Yolo County, California in the United States. The fire started on Saturday, June 8, 2019, at County Road 41 and Highway 16 and burned 2,512 acres (1,017 ha) as well as seven structures. The fire was fully contained as of 7:27 am on June 15, 2019. The cause of the fire remains under investigation. The fire was the first major incident of the season, in what fire officials claimed to be an indicator of the fire season to come.

== Progression ==
Before the ignition of the Sand fire, in the early morning hours of Saturday, June 8, PG&E made efforts to mitigate wildfire risk in the Yolo, Napa, Lake and Solano county areas during a projected red flag warning by implementing the controversial practice of cutting power to selected portions of those areas. Electricity was shut off for roughly 1,600 customers in parts Napa, Solano and Yolo counties as an additional 27,000 customers in Butte, Yuba, Nevada, El Dorado and Placer counties were cut off later that evening and into Sunday morning, June 9.

The Sand Fire was reported at 2:50 PM on Saturday, June 8, 2019, in the Capay Valley near the town Guinda in rural Yolo County, California and immediately made an aggressive burn towards the community of Rumsey, prompting mandatory evacuations of more than 300 residence living along Highway 16. The fire spread rapidly due to high winds and dry weather conditions during the red flag warning posted in the area. The blaze expanded from an estimated 20 acres to 1,000 acres (405 ha) within four hours. The fire burned on steep brush covered slopes with a low fuel moisture. Seven non-residential buildings were ultimately destroyed by the fire, including one barn. Additionally, two first responders suffered minor injuries. Highway 16 from Highway 20 to the town of Brooks was additionally closed as evacuations were put in place for residents living along County Road 41. By the morning of June 10, the fire had burned 2,200 acres (890 ha) and was 50% contained. Evacuation orders were lifted later that afternoon.

The fire grew an additional 300 acres, totaling 2,512 acres (1,017 ha) the morning of June 11. That same day, it was reported by the Central California District Bureau of Land Management that the fire had burned Bureau of Land Management land managed by the Ukiah Field Office. However, federal agencies were not reported to be fighting the fire.

== Effects ==
Evacuations were put in place June 8 for residents living along County Road 41. An evacuation center was located at the Boy Scout Cabin in Esparto, but it was closed due to zero occupancy. Evacuation orders were lifted on June 10.

On June 8, the fire's smoke had impacted air quality throughout the San Francisco Bay Area. Smoke from the Sand Fire was visible on June 8 in Marin County, Sonoma County and Solano County.
