= Esparto fireworks explosion =

2025 fire and explosion in Esparto, California

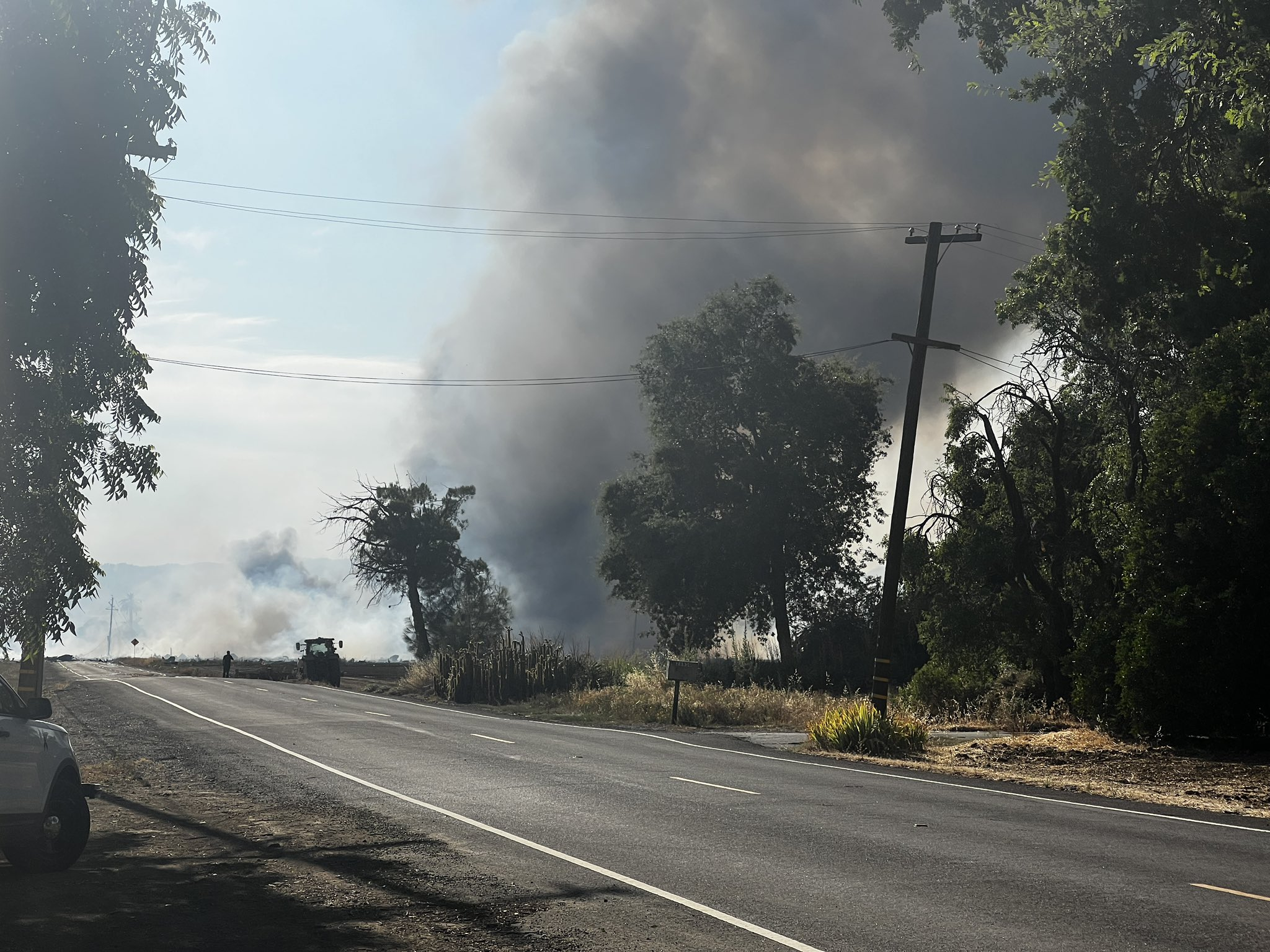
- Smoke emitting from the fire at the warehouse
- Date: July 1, 2025
- Time: 5:50 P.M. (PDT)
- Location: Esparto, California; 38.6737°N 122.0175°W
- Deaths: 7
- Injuries: 2
- Property damage: Fireworks facility destroyed; 2–3 residential buildings destroyed; Several more damaged
- Arrests: 8, including 5 charged with murder

On the afternoon of July 1, 2025, a fire broke out at a fireworks warehouse in Esparto, California, United States. The fire caused several explosions that culminated in one large blast, killing seven men and injuring two more. Two to three residential buildings were destroyed, and several others were damaged. The fire, named the Oakdale Fire, spread to 78 acres (32 ha) and was fully contained by July 6.

On April 10, 2026, eight people were arrested and charged in connection with the explosion, including five who were charged with murder.

== Explosion ==
At around 5:50 p.m. (PDT) on July 1, 2025, firefighters responded to a fire at a warehouse in Esparto, California. The fire soon engulfed the warehouse property in flames, which included two houses and several vehicles. Videos showed thick black smoke emitting from the warehouse, and bright sparks shooting from the warehouse seen in helicopter footage by KCRA-TV. Throughout the fire, small explosions would happen intermittently as the fire burned through the warehouse. The largest of these explosions occurred at around 7 p.m. (PDT), which completely destroyed the warehouse and sent debris across the area that ignited several spot fires. Some residents in Esparto reported shaking similar to that of an earthquake. Smoke from the explosion was visible from space and Doppler radar imagery. The fire that caused the explosion was named the Oakdale Fire. By the night of July 2, the fire had grown to 78 acres (32 ha) with no containment. The wildland portion of the fire was 100% contained by July 6.

== Aftermath ==
The scene of the warehouse was closed to the public and was considered a crime scene. Residents in Esparto and nearby Madison were placed under evacuation orders. Mandatory evacuations for a one-mile section of road on the south side of the facility were issued by Yolo County officials, and streets surrounding the evacuation zone were closed. By 8:50 p.m. on July 1, evacuation orders for Madison were lifted.

Several cities in Northern California were forced to either cancel or downscale their celebrations for Independence Day on July 4, because they had planned to use fireworks which were stored at the Esparto warehouse. Celebrations in San Jose, Cloverdale, Lodi, and Chico were all canceled. San Francisco and some inland cities continued with their shows.

=== Damage and casualties ===
Two to three houses were destroyed in the blast, with several more suffering some type of damage. Among those destroyed was the home of Yolo County Sheriff's Lieutenant Sam Machado, who was also the owner of the property that the warehouse was located on. It was unclear if Machado himself was injured.

After the explosion, seven men went missing and two injuries were reported. On July 4, human remains were discovered at the explosion site; Yolo County officials did not immediately say how many were found. Four workers were publicly identified by family and friends: brothers 18-year-old Jesus Ramos and 22-year-old Jhony Ramos, (Note: Also spelled Jhonny Ramos) 28-year-old Junior Melendez, and 43-year-old Carlos Javier Rodriguez-Mora. Melendez was a stepbrother to the Ramos brothers, and it was the younger Ramos's first day at work. On July 7, Yolo County officials confirmed that the remains of all seven missing people were found and DNA testing had begun. The county coroner's office confirmed all seven victims' identities in a July 11 press release.

List of explosion victims
| Name | Age |
|---|---|
| Jesus Maneces Ramos | 18 |
| Jhony Ernesto Ramos | 22 |
| Joel "Junior" Jeremias Melendez | 28 |
| Carlos Javier Rodriguez-Mora | 43 |
| Angel Mathew Voller | 18 |
| Neil Justin Li | 41 |
| Christopher Goltiao Bocog | 45 |

=== Investigations ===
The California Department of Forestry and Fire Protection (CAL FIRE) was employed to lead the investigation into the explosion, with the Bureau of Alcohol, Tobacco, Firearms and Explosives (ATF) being called in for assistance. KCRA-TV has raised concerns about the involvement of the Yolo County Sheriff's Office due to the ownership of the property where the explosion occurred by Sheriff's Lieutenant Machado.

The Blackstar Fireworks operated next to Machado's house, while Devastating Pyrotechnics was reportedly the owner of the warehouse. According to the director of the Yolo County Planning Commission, Devastating Fireworks had no business license or permission to store fireworks on the property, and that the property was limited to agricultural uses only. The executive director of the American Pyrotechnics Association, Julie Heckman, said that the building was not properly equipped to store fireworks. Fire officials said that they had performed safety checks on the property before the explosion, but did not elaborate on whether or not there were any concerns. The owner of Blackstar Fireworks, Craig Cutright, was also an employee of Devastating Pyrotechnics.

On July 4, the San Francisco Chronicle reported that Kenneth Chee, owner and CEO of Devastating Pyrotechnics, was denied a license by the ATF to purchase or own explosives. This was due to a 1998 conviction of assault with a firearm and firing a gun from a vehicle at a person that resulted in a five-year sentence; the ATF prevents anyone convicted of a crime punishable by more than a year in prison from obtaining a federal explosives license. Despite being denied federal licenses, he was granted permission from the State Fire Marshal to trade, sell, and launch fireworks; all three licenses were listed under Chee's name. Devastating Pyrotechnics was also already permitted to store fireworks in storage containers far away from the site of the explosion, around 2,000 feet (610 m) away.

The General Fireworks Advisory Committee of the California State Fire Marshal's office met in August and heard details about legislation introduced by State Senator Christopher Cabaldon in response.

On April 10, 2026, five people were charged, including a former Yolo County Sheriff lieutenant, with murder. The charge statements released mention that the Yolo County Sheriff's Office lieutenant stored over a million pounds of explosives on his own property, and used his position in the Sheriff's Office to shield the illicit operation from government scrutiny.

== See also ==
- Fireworks policy of the United States
