= Sand Fire =

Sand Fire may refer to:

- Sand Fire (2016), a wildfire that burned in California in 2016
- Sand Fire (2019), a wildfire that burned in California in 2019
