= Woodland High School (California) =

Woodland Senior High School

Location
- 21 N. West Street, Woodland, California; United States; 38°41′08″N 121°47′07″W

Information
- Type: Public secondary
- Motto: "Home of the Wolves"
- School district: Woodland Joint Unified School District
- Principal: Gerald Salcido
- Staff: 59.92 (FTE)
- Grades: 9 to 12
- Enrollment: 1,171 (2023-2024)
- Student to teacher ratio: 19.54
- Colors: Orange and white
- Mascot: Woody the Wolf
- Rival: Pioneer High School
- Website: www.whs.wjusd.org

Woodland High School is a high school in Woodland, California, United States. It enrolls students in 9th through 12th grade.

== Notable alumni ==
- Jillian Camarena, Olympic shot put competitor
- Vicente Escobedo, Olympic boxer, professional boxer under Golden Boy Promotions
- Hunter Moore, website creator, hacker, and convicted felon
- Alyssa Nakken, the first female Major League Baseball coach
- Dustin Pedroia, professional baseball player (Boston Red Sox)
- Craig Penrose, professional football player
- Chris Vargas, professional football player
- Jack Yerman, Olympic gold medalist in track and field
- Anthony Hernandez, UFC fighter in the Middleweight Division
