= Guinda, California =

Guinda
- census-designated place
- Location of Guinda in Yolo County, California

- Location in California
- Coordinates: 38°49′45″N 122°11′38″W
- Country: United States
- State: California
- County: Yolo

Area
  - Total: 2.926 sq mi (7.578 km^{2})
  - Land: 2.926 sq mi (7.578 km^{2})
  - Water: 0 sq mi (0 km^{2}) 0%
- Elevation: 360 ft (110 m)

Population (2020)
  - Total: 245
  - Density: 83.7/sq mi (32.3/km^{2})
- FIPS code: 06-31540

Guinda (Spanish for "Sour cherry") is a census-designated place in Yolo County, California, United States. It is located in the Capay Valley, in the northwestern portion of the county, 13 miles (21 km) northwest of Esparto. Guinda's ZIP Code is 95637 and the town is in area code 530. It lies at an elevation of 361 feet (110 m).

As of the 2020 census, Guinda had a population of 245.

A post office was opened in the town in 1889.

== Etymology ==
The town was named by Southern Pacific Railroad officials after a cherry tree at the site.

== Geography ==
According to the United States Census Bureau, the CDP covers an area of 2.9 square miles (7.6 km^{2}), all land.

== Demographics ==
Historical population
Census	Pop.	Note	%±
2010	254		—
2020	245		−3.5%
U.S. Decennial Census; 1850–1870 1880-1890; 1900 1910 1920; 1930 1940 1950; 1960 1970 1980; 1990 2000 2010

Guinda first appeared as a census designated place in the 2010 U.S. census.

The 2020 United States census reported that Guinda had a population of 245. The population density was 83.7 inhabitants per square mile (32.3/km^{2}). The racial makeup of Guinda was 166 (67.8%) White, 10 (4.1%) African American, 0 (0.0%) Native American, 0 (0.0%) Asian, 0 (0.0%) Pacific Islander, 20 (8.2%) from other races, and 49 (20.0%) from two or more races. Hispanic or Latino of any race were 67 persons (27.3%).

The whole population lived in households. There were 108 households, out of which 39 (36.1%) had children under the age of 18 living in them, 65 (60.2%) were married-couple households, 8 (7.4%) were cohabiting couple households, 27 (25.0%) had a female householder with no partner present, and 8 (7.4%) had a male householder with no partner present. 10 households (9.3%) were one person, and 4 (3.7%) were one person aged 65 or older. The average household size was 2.27. There were 87 families (80.6% of all households).

The age distribution was 46 people (18.8%) under the age of 18, 9 people (3.7%) aged 18 to 24, 34 people (13.9%) aged 25 to 44, 87 people (35.5%) aged 45 to 64, and 69 people (28.2%) who were 65 years of age or older. The median age was 54.8 years. For every 100 females, there were 94.4 males.

There were 126 housing units at an average density of 43.1 units per square mile (16.6 units/km^{2}), of which 108 (85.7%) were occupied. Of these, 64 (59.3%) were owner-occupied, and 44 (40.7%) were occupied by renters.

== Education ==
Guinda is served by the Esparto Unified School District.

== See also ==
- County Fire
- Sand Fire
