= Yolo, California =

Unincorporated community in California, United States

Yolo
- Unincorporated community and census-designated place
- Location in California Yolo (the United States)
- Coordinates: 38°43′55″N 121°48′28″W
- Country: United States
- State: California
- County: Yolo

Area
  - Total: 1.37 sq mi (3.56 km^{2})
  - Land: 1.37 sq mi (3.56 km^{2})
  - Water: 0 sq mi (0 km^{2}) 0%
- Elevation: 82 ft (25 m)

Population (2020)
  - Total: 425
  - Density: 309/sq mi (119/km^{2})
- Time zone: UTC-8 (Pacific (PST))
  - Summer (DST): UTC-7 (PDT)
- GNIS feature IDs: 1660214; 2583187

Yolo (Wintun: Yo-loy) is an unincorporated community and census-designated place in Yolo County, California, United States. It is located five miles (8 km) northwest of the county seat, Woodland and 24 miles (39 km) northwest of the state capital of Sacramento. Yolo's ZIP Code is 95697 and its area code 530. It lies at an elevation of 82 feet (25 m). The population was 425 at the 2020 census.

== History ==
Yolo was formerly known as "Cacheville", "Cochran's Crossing", "Cochranes Crossing", "Hutton's Ranch", and "Travelers Home".

== Geography ==
According to the United States Census Bureau, the CDP covers an area of 1.4 square miles (3.6 km^{2}), all land.

=== Climate ===
The Köppen Climate Classification subtype for this climate is "CSA " (Mediterranean Climate).

== Demographics ==
Historical population
Census	Pop.	Note	%±
2010	450		—
2020	425		−5.6%
U.S. Decennial Census; 1850–1870 1880-1890; 1900 1910 1920; 1930 1940 1950; 1960 1970 1980; 1990 2000 2010

Yolo first appeared as a census designated place in the 2010 U.S. census.

The 2020 United States census reported that Yolo had a population of 425. The population density was 309.5 inhabitants per square mile (119.5/km^{2}). The racial makeup of Yolo was 139 (32.7%) White, 1 (0.2%) African American, 30 (7.1%) Native American, 4 (0.9%) Asian, 0 (0.0%) Pacific Islander, 167 (39.3%) from other races, and 84 (19.8%) from two or more races. Hispanic or Latino of any race were 302 persons (71.1%).

The census reported that 99.1% of the population lived in households, 4 people (0.9%) lived in non-institutionalized group quarters, and no one was institutionalized. There were 153 households, out of which 48 (31.4%) included children under the age of 18, 68 (44.4%) were married-couple households, 6 (3.9%) were cohabiting couple households, 52 (34.0%) had a female householder with no partner present, and 27 (17.6%) had a male householder with no partner present. 38 households (24.8%) were one person, and 20 (13.1%) were one person aged 65 or older. The average household size was 2.75. There were 98 families (64.1% of all households).

The age distribution was 101 people (23.8%) under the age of 18, 34 people (8.0%) aged 18 to 24, 83 people (19.5%) aged 25 to 44, 128 people (30.1%) aged 45 to 64, and 79 people (18.6%) who were 65 years of age or older. The median age was 42.6 years. For every 100 females, there were 99.5 males.

There were 158 housing units at an average density of 115.1 units per square mile (44.4 units/km^{2}), of which 153 (96.8%) were occupied. Of these, 60 (39.2%) were owner-occupied, and 93 (60.8%) were occupied by renters.

== Education ==
The community is served by the Woodland Joint Unified School District.

Cache Creek High School, a continuation high school named after the nearby stream of water, is located in Yolo and is a part of WUSD. Students residing in Yolo go to schools in Woodland, unless high school students choose to attend Cache Creek.
