= Monument Hills, California =

Monument Hills
- census-designated place
- Location in California
- Coordinates: 38°39′51″N 121°52′32″W
- Country: United States
- State: California
- County: Yolo

Area
  - Total: 3.988 sq mi (10.329 km^{2})
  - Land: 3.988 sq mi (10.329 km^{2})
  - Water: 0 sq mi (0 km^{2}) 0%
- Elevation: 135 ft (41 m)

Population (2020)
  - Total: 1,702
  - Density: 426.8/sq mi (164.8/km^{2})

Monument Hills is a census-designated place in Yolo County, California, United States. Monument Hills sits at an elevation of 135 feet (41 m). The 2020 United States census reported Monument Hills' population as 1,702.

== Geography ==
According to the United States Census Bureau, the CDP covers an area of 4.0 square miles (10.3 km^{2}), all land.

== Demographics ==
Historical population
Census	Pop.	Note	%±
2010	1,542		—
2020	1,702		10.4%
U.S. Decennial Census; 1850–1870 1880-1890; 1900 1910 1920; 1930 1940 1950; 1960 1970 1980; 1990 2000 2010

Monument Hills first appeared as a census designated place in the 2010 U.S. census.

=== 2020 census ===
As of the 2020 census, Monument Hills had a population of 1,702. The population density was 426.8 inhabitants per square mile (164.8/km^{2}).

The whole population lived in households, and 0.0% of residents lived in urban areas while 100.0% lived in rural areas.

There were 586 households, out of which 186 (31.7%) had children under the age of 18 living in them, 412 (70.3%) were married-couple households, 18 (3.1%) were cohabiting couple households, 89 (15.2%) had a female householder with no partner present, and 67 (11.4%) had a male householder with no partner present. 107 households (18.3%) were one person, and 65 (11.1%) were one person aged 65 or older. The average household size was 2.9. There were 462 families (78.8% of all households).

The age distribution was 383 people (22.5%) under the age of 18, 125 people (7.3%) aged 18 to 24, 321 people (18.9%) aged 25 to 44, 543 people (31.9%) aged 45 to 64, and 330 people (19.4%) who were 65 years of age or older. The median age was 46.4 years. For every 100 females, there were 97.2 males, and for every 100 females age 18 and over there were 97.5 males age 18 and over.

There were 605 housing units at an average density of 151.7 units per square mile (58.6 units/km^{2}), of which 586 (96.9%) were occupied. Of these, 528 (90.1%) were owner-occupied, and 58 (9.9%) were occupied by renters. Of all housing units, 3.1% were vacant; the homeowner vacancy rate was 0.2% and the rental vacancy rate was 7.5%.

Racial composition as of the 2020 census
Race	Number	Percent
White	1,072	63.0%
Black or African American	18	1.1%
American Indian and Alaska Native	35	2.1%
Asian	109	6.4%
Native Hawaiian and Other Pacific Islander	0	0.0%
Some other race	170	10.0%
Two or more races	298	17.5%
Hispanic or Latino (of any race)	487	28.6%

== Education ==
Most of the CDP is served by the Woodland Joint Unified School District, while a portion is within the Esparto Unified School District.
