= Woodland Joint Unified School District (California) =

School district in California, United States

Address
- 435 Sixth Street Woodland, California, 95695; United States

District information
- Type: Public
- Grades: K–12
- NCES District ID: 0643080

Students and staff
- Students: 9,658
- Teachers: 471.38 (FTE)
- Staff: 439.29 (FTE)
- Student–teacher ratio: 20.49

Other information
- Website: www.wjusd.org

Woodland Joint Unified School District or WJUSD is a school district in Woodland, California. Established in July 1965, it now has a budget of over $111,200,000. The student population of the district was just over 10,500 in the 2018-2019 year. It contains: 11 elementary schools, one charter elementary school, two middle schools, two high schools, one continuation high school, and one adult education center.

The district includes Woodland, Yolo, and most of Monument Hills.

== Elementary schools ==
- Beamer Park Elementary School
- Dingle Elementary School
- Freeman Elementary School
- Gibson Elementary School
- Rhoda Maxwell Elementary School
- Plainfield Elementary School
- Ramon S. Tafoya Elementary School
- Spring Lake Elementary School
- Whitehead Elementary School
- Woodland Community Day School
- Woodland Prairie Elementary School
- Zamora Elementary School

== Middle schools ==
- Douglass Middle School
- Lee Middle School

== High schools ==
- Pioneer High School
- Woodland High School
- Cache Creek Continuation High School

== Adult education ==
- Woodland Adult Education

== Charter schools ==
- Science and Technology Academy in Knights Landing
