= Pioneer High School (Woodland, California) =

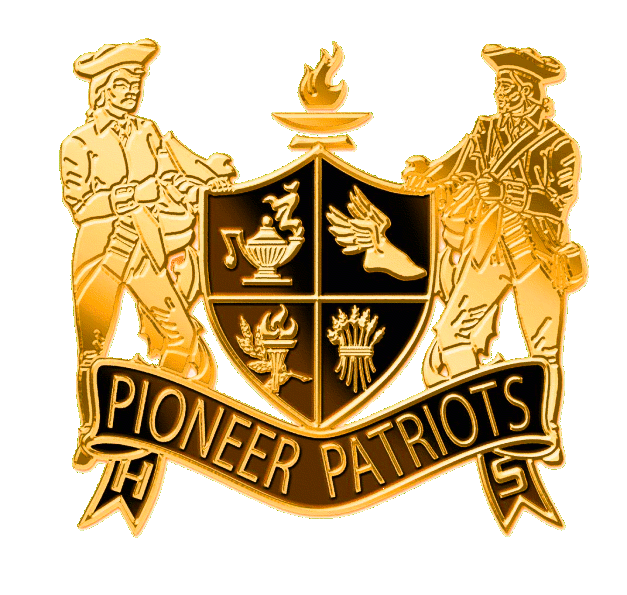

Location
- 1400 Pioneer Ave. Woodland, California; United States
- 38.66007°N 121.74104°W

Information
- Type: Public
- Established: 2003
- School district: Woodland Joint Unified School District
- Principal: Heather King
- Staff: 81.07 (FTE)
- Grades: 9 to 12
- Enrollment: 1,635 (2023-2024)
- Student to teacher ratio: 20.17
- Colors: Vegas Gold and Black
- Athletics: Football, Basketball, Baseball, Soccer, Wrestling, Cross Country, Volleyball, Tennis, Golf, Swimming, Track and Field, Softball, Water Polo
- Mascot: Patriots
- Website: Pioneer High School

Pioneer High School (also known as Pioneer High, PHS or Pioneer) is a high school located in Woodland, California. It is one of two high schools in the Woodland Joint Unified School District. It includes grades nine through twelve. As of the 2023-2024 school year, it enrolled approximately 1600 students. It is the newest high school in Woodland, opening in 2003.

The school mascot is a patriot (a revolutionary minuteman). The school serves a primarily agricultural community with mostly middle-class families. Major employers in the community include healthcare, distribution warehouses, and agriculture. Pioneer High School and Woodland High School draw students from two public middle schools and two local private schools.

== History ==
Pioneer High School was built in 2002-2003 and was in the final stages of completion when it opened for 9th and 10th graders on September 2, 2003. PHS is the second comprehensive high school in the Woodland Joint Unified School District and is accredited through the Western Association of Schools and Colleges. The first graduating class was in 2006, and the first four-year graduating class was in 2007.

== Graduation requirements ==
High School graduation requirements in the Woodland Joint Unified School District include eight semesters of English, two semesters of foreign language or two semesters of fine art, six semesters of mathematics, including one full year of algebra, four semesters of science, six semesters of social science, one semester of health, and four semesters of physical education, plus electives, for a total of 230 units. Students are required to complete 40 hours of community service.

== See also ==
- Woodland, California
