= Yolo County, California =

County in California, United States

Yolo County
- County
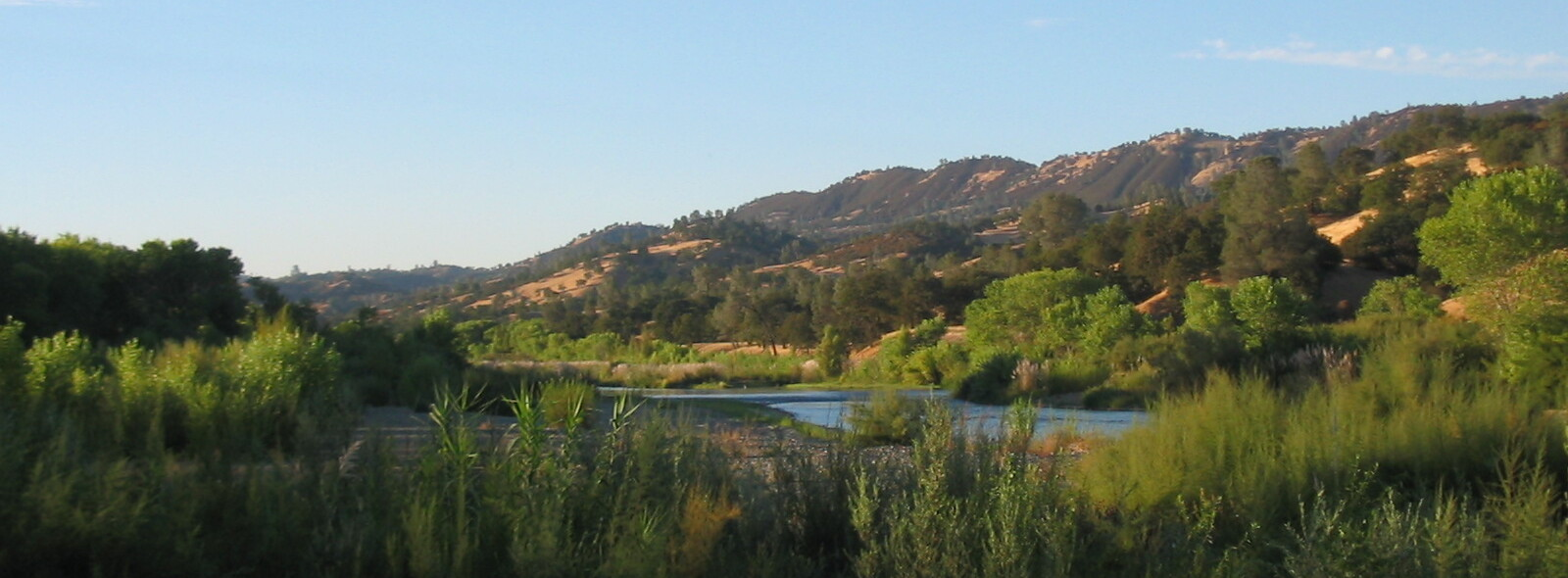
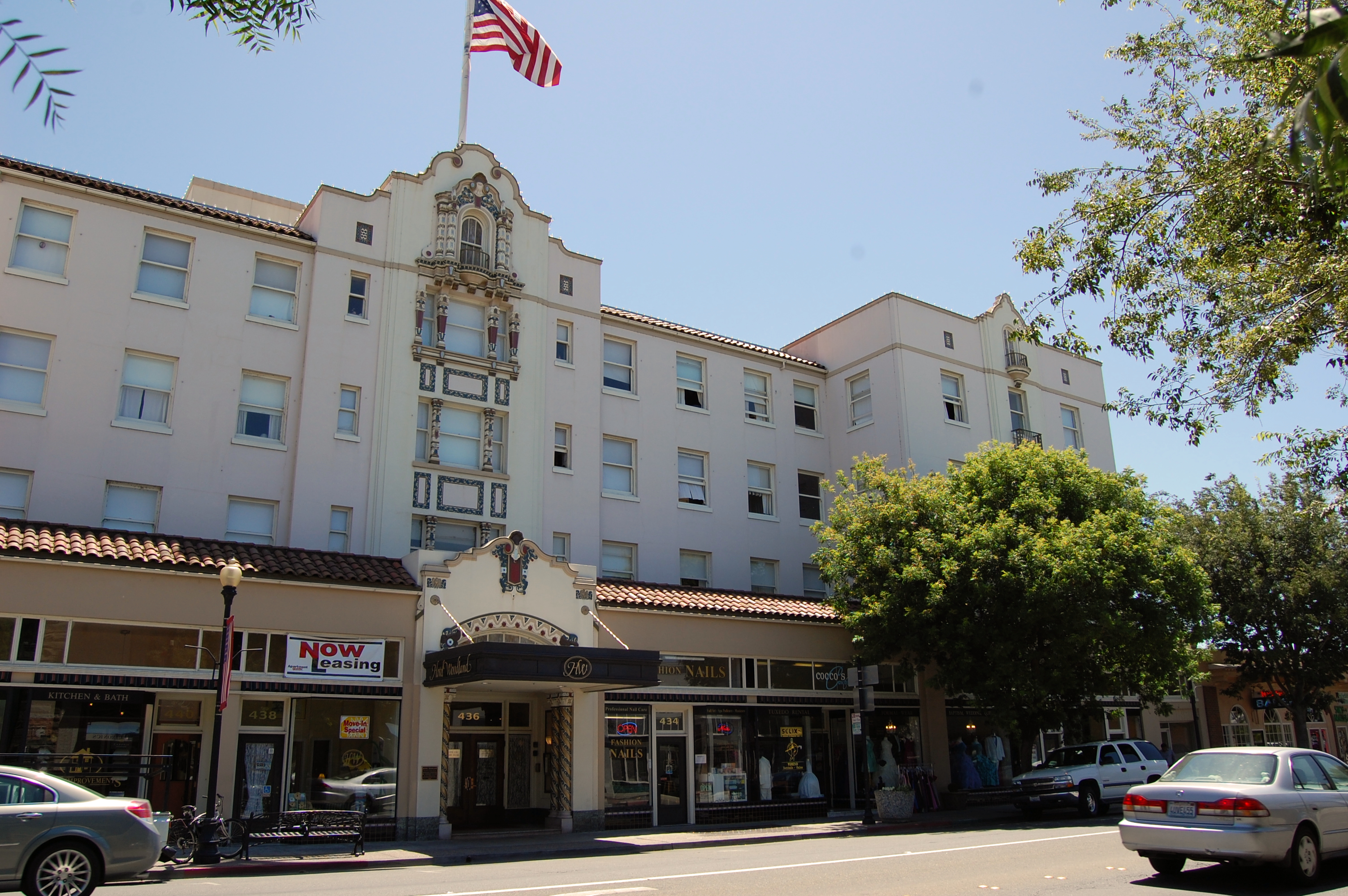
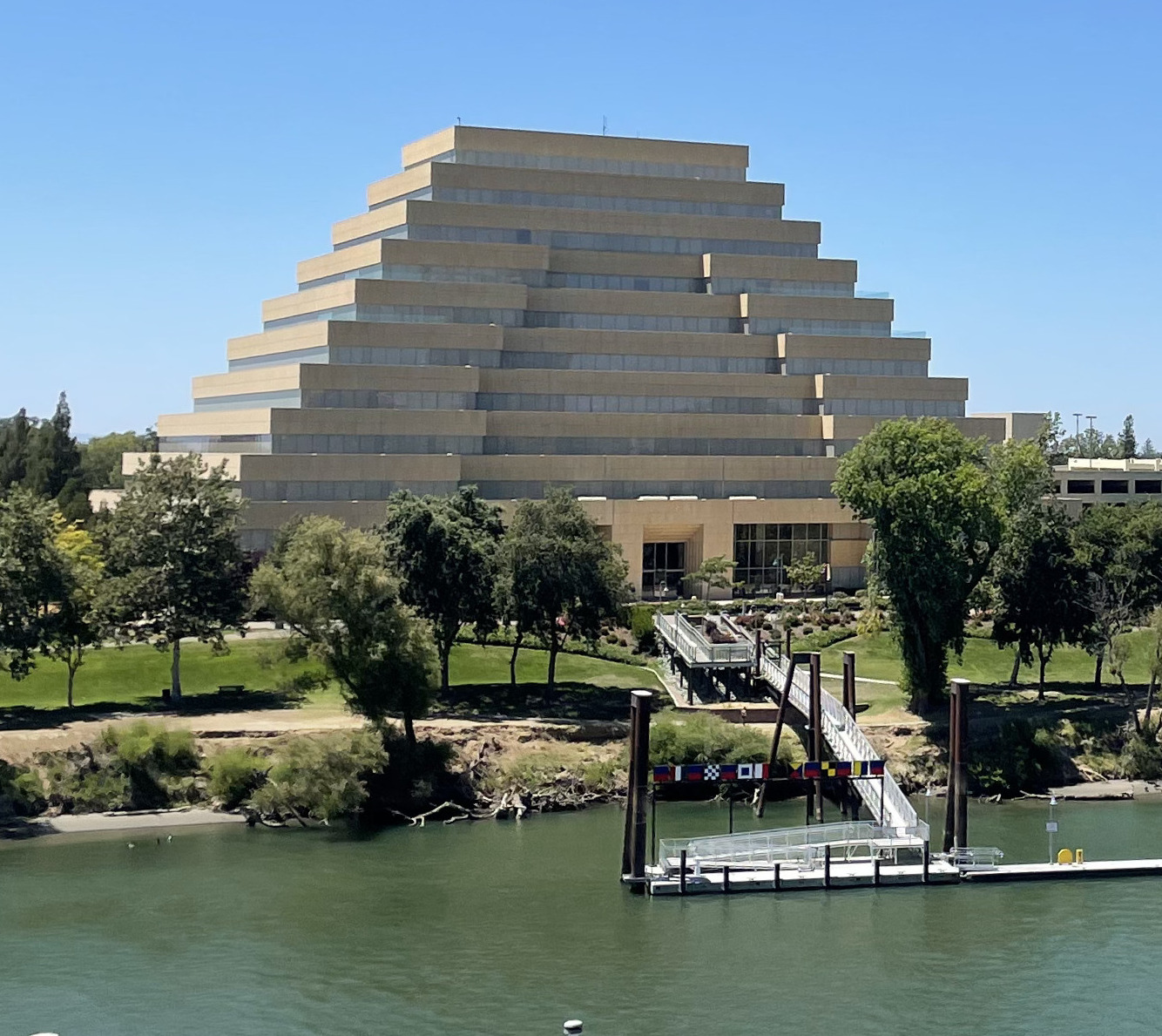
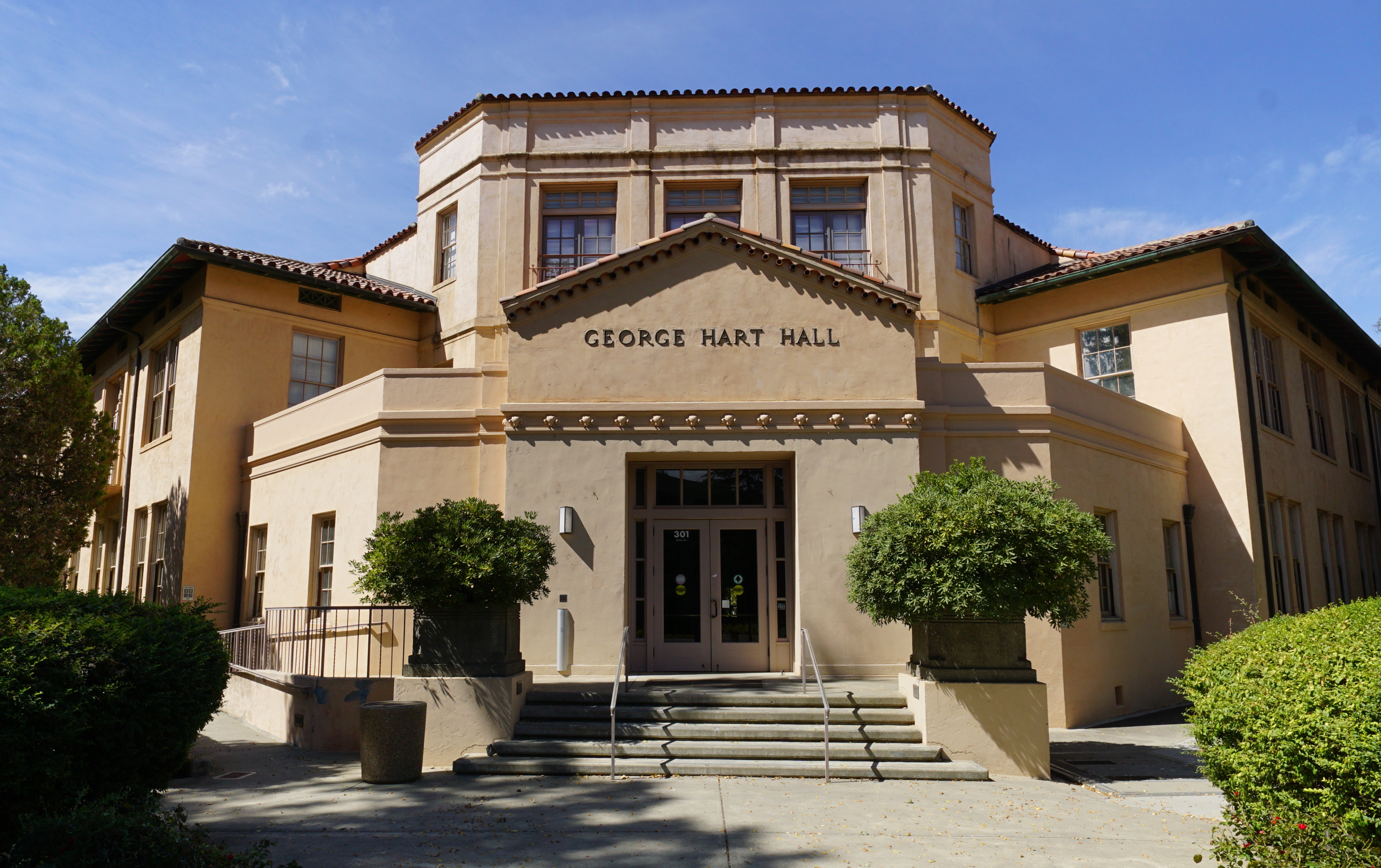
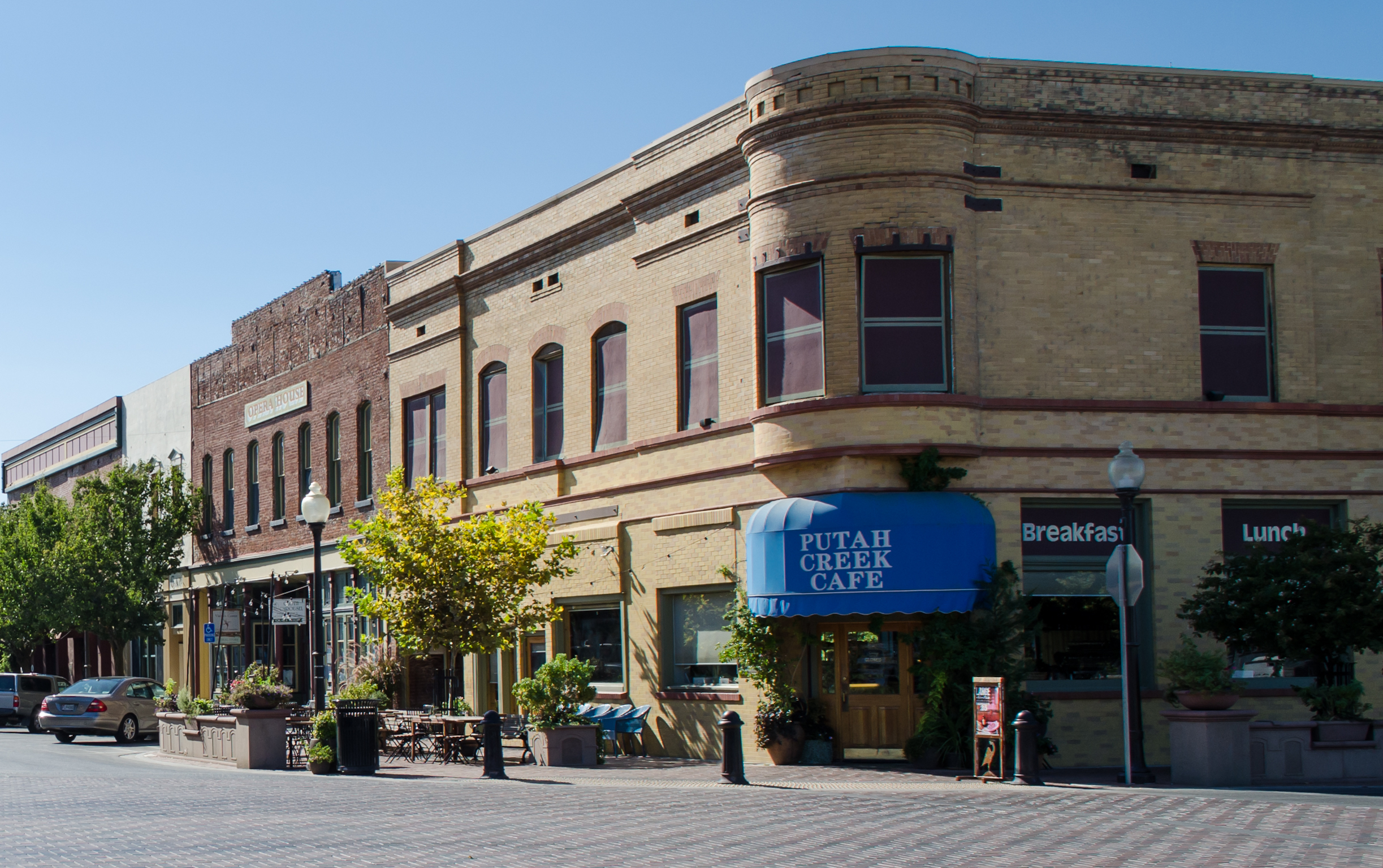
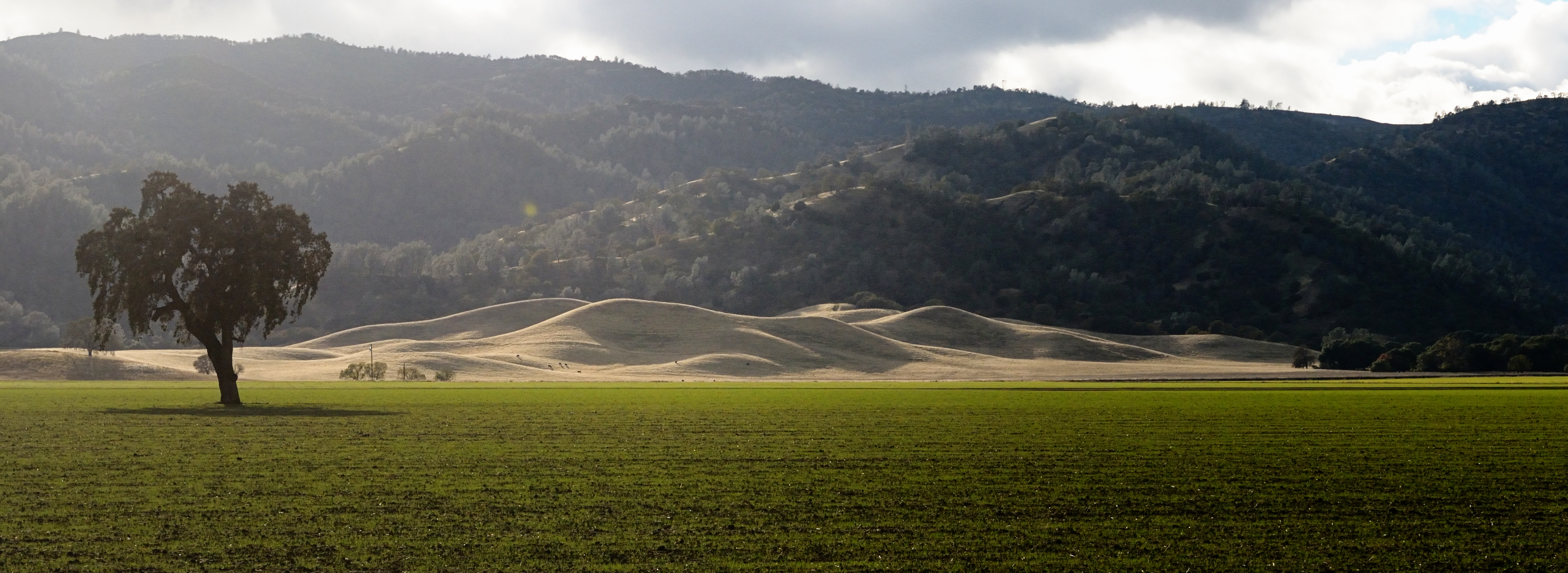
- Cache Creek in Guinda Woodland West Sacramento Davis Winters Capay Valley and the Blue Ridge Mountains

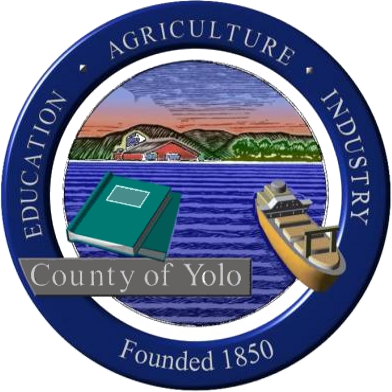
- Flag Seal
- Interactive map of Yolo County
- Location in the state of California
- Coordinates: 38°33′14″N 121°44′17″W
- Country: United States
- State: California
- Region: Sacramento Valley
- CSA: Greater Sacramento
- Incorporated: February 18, 1850
- County seat: Woodland
- Largest city: Davis (population); West Sacramento (area)

Government
  - Type: Council–CAO
  - Body: Board of Supervisors
  - Chair: Sheila Allen
  - Vice Chair: Angel Barajas
  - Board of Supervisors: Supervisors: Oscar Villegas; Lucas Frerichs; Mary Vixie Sandy; Sheila Allen; Angel Barajas
  - Chief Administrative Officer: Gerardo Pinedo

Area
  - Total: 1,024 sq mi (2,650 km^{2})
  - Land: 1,015 sq mi (2,630 km^{2})
  - Water: 8.9 sq mi (23 km^{2})
- Highest elevation: 3,123 ft (952 m)

Population (2020)
  - Total: 216,403
  - Estimate (2025): 224,410 ▲
  - Density: 213.2/sq mi (82.32/km^{2})

GDP
  - Total: $18.735 billion (2022)
- Time zone: UTC-8 (Pacific Time Zone)
  - Summer (DST): UTC-7 (Pacific Daylight Time)
- Area codes: 530, 916, 279
- FIPS code: 06-113
- GNIS feature ID: 277321
- Congressional districts: 4th, 7th
- Website: www.yolocounty.gov

Yolo County (/ˈjoʊloʊ/; Wintun: Yo-loy), officially the County of Yolo, is a county located in the northern portion of the U.S. state of California. Yolo County was one of the original counties of California, created in 1850 at the time of statehood. As of the 2020 census, its population was 216,403. Its county seat is Woodland. Yolo County is included in the greater Sacramento metropolitan area in the Sacramento Valley.

== Etymology ==
In the original act of 1850, the name was spelled "Yola". Yolo is a Patwin Native American name variously believed to be a corruption of a tribal name, Yo-loy, meaning "a place abounding in rushes", the village of Yodoi, believed to be in the vicinity of Knights Landing, California, or the name of the chief of said village, Yodo.

== History ==
Yolo County was one of the original counties of California, created in 1850 at the time of statehood.

== Government ==
Yolo County is a California Constitution defined general law county and is governed by an elected Board of Supervisors. The Board consists of five members, elected by districts, who serve every four-year staggered terms. The county is governed by a board of five district supervisors as well the governments of its four incorporated cities: Davis, West Sacramento, Winters, and Woodland.

== Geography ==
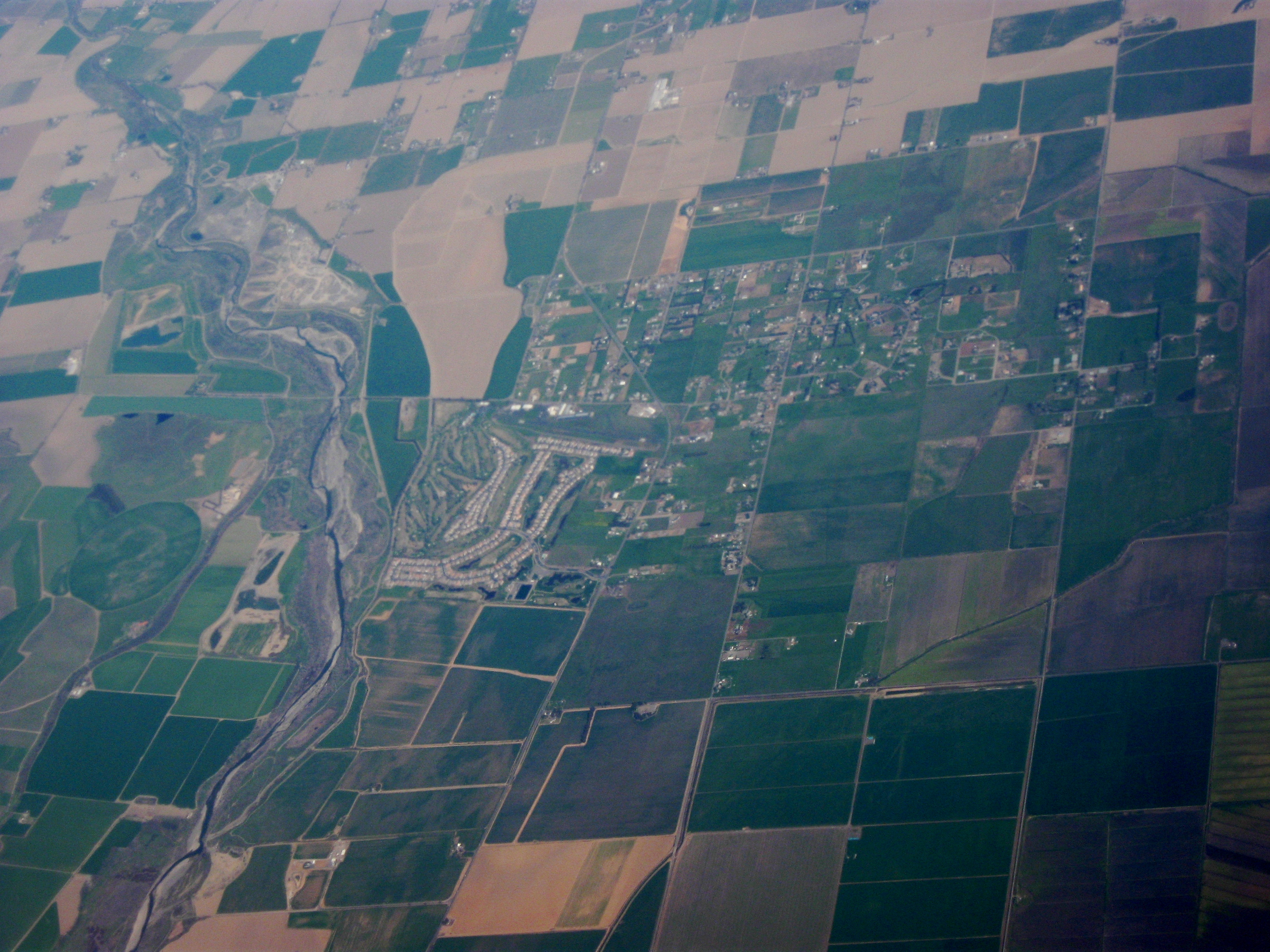
Aerial view of Watts Woodland Airport and surrounding area

According to the U.S. Census Bureau, the county has a total area of 1,024 square miles (2,650 km^{2}), of which 8.9 square miles (23 km^{2}) (0.9%) is covered by water.

=== Adjacent counties ===
- Colusa County - north
- Sutter County - northeast
- Sacramento County - east
- Solano County - south
- Napa County - west
- Lake County - northwest

== Transportation ==
=== Major highways ===
- I-5
  - I-5 BL
- I-80
  - I-80 BL / US 50 – I-80 BL is unsigned
    - I-305 (unsigned)
- I-505
- SR 16
- SR 45
- SR 84
- SR 113
- SR 128
- SR 275 (Tower Bridge)

=== County roads ===
Addressing in Yolo County is based on a system of numbered county roads. The numbering system works in the following way:

1. North–south roads have numbers from 41 to 117 and increase from west to east.
2. East–west roads have numbers from 1 to 38A, and then from 151 to 161, and increase from north to south.

Each integer road number is generally one mile (1.6 km) apart, with letters occasionally designating roads less than one mile (1.6 km) apart. County roads entering urban areas generally become named roads once they cross a city boundary. Some examples include County Road 101 in Woodland being renamed Pioneer Avenue, and County Road 102 (also known as County Route E8) in Davis being named Pole Line Road.

=== Public transportation ===
- Yolobus (Yolo County Transportation District) runs buses throughout Yolo County and into Sacramento, and Sacramento International Airport.
- The University of California, Davis and the city of Davis jointly run Unitrans, a combination local city bus and campus shuttle.
- Amtrak has a station in Davis.

=== Airports ===
- Yolo County Airport
- University Airport
- Borges–Clarksburg Airport
- Watts–Woodland Airport

=== Port ===
The Port of Sacramento, now known as the Port of West Sacramento, is an inland port in West Sacramento, California, in the Sacramento metropolitan area. It is 79 nautical miles (146 km) northeast of San Francisco, and is centered in the California Central Valley, one of the richest agricultural regions in the world.

== Crime ==
This table includes the number of incidents reported and the rate per 1,000 persons for each type of offense.

Population and crime rates
Population	198,889	
Violent crime	556	2.80
Homicide	7	0.04
Forcible rape	68	0.34
Robbery	171	0.86
Aggravated assault	310	1.56
Property crime	2,979	14.98
Burglary	1,357	6.82
Larceny-theft (Note: Only larceny-theft cases involving property over $400 in value are reported as property crimes.)	3,844	19.33
Motor vehicle theft	559	2.81
Arson	75	0.38

=== Cities by population and crime rates ===
Cities by population and crime rates
City	Population	Violent crimes	Violent crime rate per 1,000 persons	Property crimes	Property crime rate per 1,000 persons
Davis	69,289	107	1.53	2,190	31.39
West Sacramento	53,727	212	3.90	1,603	29.48
Winters	7,286	9	1.22	84	12.49
Woodland	60,531	224	3.66	1,488	24.32

== Politics ==
Yolo is a strongly Democratic county in presidential and congressional elections. The last Republican presidential candidate to win a majority in the county was Dwight Eisenhower in 1952, which is the longest Republican drought for any California county. In fact, since 1928, Eisenhower's win in 1952 was the only time the county was carried by the Republican presidential nominee.

United States presidential election results for Yolo County, California
Year	Republican		Democratic		Third party(ies)	
Year	No.	%	No.	%	No.	%
1880	1,256	47.38%	1,374	51.83%	21	0.79%
1884	1,412	48.74%	1,421	49.05%	64	2.21%
1888	1,350	44.66%	1,580	52.27%	93	3.08%
1892	1,372	40.78%	1,707	50.74%	285	8.47%
1896	1,485	44.84%	1,753	52.93%	74	2.23%
1900	1,510	45.81%	1,687	51.18%	99	3.00%
1904	1,702	51.87%	1,301	39.65%	278	8.47%
1908	1,707	49.01%	1,553	44.59%	223	6.40%
1912	9	0.23%	2,239	56.06%	1,746	43.72%
1916	2,334	42.43%	2,922	53.12%	245	4.45%
1920	3,375	61.95%	1,787	32.80%	286	5.25%
1924	2,470	45.35%	797	14.63%	2,180	40.02%
1928	3,545	56.96%	2,641	42.43%	38	0.61%
1932	2,515	29.49%	5,780	67.77%	234	2.74%
1936	2,594	29.84%	5,992	68.94%	106	1.22%
1940	4,373	40.29%	6,380	58.78%	101	0.93%
1944	4,233	41.84%	5,837	57.70%	46	0.45%
1948	5,560	43.83%	6,655	52.47%	469	3.70%
1952	9,375	53.17%	8,119	46.04%	139	0.79%
1956	9,347	47.99%	10,075	51.72%	57	0.29%
1960	10,104	44.73%	12,395	54.87%	90	0.40%
1964	7,976	30.36%	18,266	69.52%	32	0.12%
1968	11,123	38.41%	15,833	54.67%	2,004	6.92%
1972	17,969	42.04%	23,694	55.44%	1,075	2.52%
1976	18,376	42.42%	23,533	54.33%	1,408	3.25%
1980	19,603	39.45%	21,527	43.32%	8,560	17.23%
1984	24,329	47.84%	25,879	50.89%	645	1.27%
1988	22,358	41.89%	30,429	57.01%	585	1.10%
1992	17,574	28.15%	33,297	53.33%	11,565	18.52%
1996	18,807	32.38%	33,033	56.88%	6,239	10.74%
2000	23,057	37.53%	33,747	54.93%	4,632	7.54%
2004	28,005	38.75%	42,885	59.34%	1,379	1.91%
2008	24,592	30.84%	53,488	67.07%	1,669	2.09%
2012	23,368	31.29%	48,715	65.24%	2,588	3.47%
2016	20,739	25.26%	54,752	66.70%	6,599	8.04%
2020	27,292	28.05%	67,598	69.48%	2,404	2.47%
2024	27,844	30.06%	61,405	66.30%	3,372	3.64%

Yolo County has been somewhat more likely to elect Republican governors since then (Ronald Reagan carried the county in 1966, George Deukmejian in 1986, and Arnold Schwarzenegger in 2003 and 2006).

In the United States House of Representatives, Yolo County is split between California's 4th and 7th congressional districts, represented by Mike Thompson (D–St. Helena) and Doris Matsui (D–Sacramento), respectively.

In the California State Senate, the county is entirely with the 3rd Senate district, represented by Christopher Cabaldon.

In the California State Assembly, the county is entirely within the 4th Assembly district, represented by Cecilia Aguiar-Curry.

In June 1978, Yolo was one of only three counties in the entire state to reject Proposition 13 (the others being San Francisco and Kern).

In November 2008, Yolo was one of just three counties in California's interior in which voters rejected Proposition 8 to ban gay marriage. Yolo voters rejected Proposition 8 by a vote of 58.65 to 41.35%. The other interior counties in which Proposition 8 failed to receive a majority of votes were Alpine County and Mono County. In 2024, all three joined 11 other interior counties which voted in favor of Proposition 3, which repealed Proposition 8 and established an affirmative right to marriage in the constitution, with Yolo supporting Proposition 3 70.4% to 29.6%.

Population and registered voters
Total population	198,889	
Registered voters (Note: Percentage of registered voters with respect to total population. Percentages of party members with respect to registered voters follow.)	101,849	51.2%
Democratic	48,106	47.2%
Republican	24,333	23.9%
Democratic–Republican spread	+23,773	+23.3%
American Independent	2,835	2.8%
Green	1,044	1.0%
Libertarian	671	0.7%
Peace and Freedom	376	0.4%
Americans Elect	4	0.0%
Other	404	0.4%
No party preference	24,076	23.6%

=== Cities by population and voter registration ===
Cities by population and voter registration 2013
City	Population	Registered voters	Democratic	Republican	D–R spread	Other	No party preference
Davis	65,359	57.6%	54.0%	14.7%	+39.3%	7.1%	26.3%
West Sacramento	47,278	48.9%	44.7%	26.0%	+18.7%	9.4%	23.4%
Winters	6,616	50.3%	44.8%	27.6%	+17.2%	7.8%	22.6%
Woodland	55,229	46.9%	43.7%	30.4%	+13.3%	8.2%	20.9%

== Demographics ==
Historical population
Census	Pop.	Note	%±
1850	1,086		—
1860	4,716		334.3%
1870	9,899		109.9%
1880	11,772		18.9%
1890	12,684		7.7%
1900	13,618		7.4%
1910	13,926		2.3%
1920	17,105		22.8%
1930	23,644		38.2%
1940	27,243		15.2%
1950	40,640		49.2%
1960	65,727		61.7%
1970	91,788		39.7%
1980	113,374		23.5%
1990	141,092		24.4%
2000	168,660		19.5%
2010	200,849		19.1%
2020	216,403		7.7%
2025 (est.)	224,410	▲	3.7%
U.S. Decennial Census; 1790-1960 1900–1990; 1990-2000 2010 2020

=== 2025 American Community Survey estimate ===
The Census Bureau estimated that in 2025, Yolo County’s population was 224,410. In terms of ethnicity, the population was estimated at 41.2% Non-Hispanic White, 33.3% Hispanic or Latino, 2.9% Black, 15.8% Asian, 0.6% Pacific Islander, 0.4% Native American, and 5.8% Multiracial.

Total (Note: All listed groups aside from Hispanic or Latino exclude Hispanic residents.)	Population	Percentage
White	92,531	41.23%
Hispanic or Latino	74,851	33.35%
Black	6,459	2.88%
Asian	35,467	15.80%
Pacific Islander	1,268	0.57%
Native American	983	0.44%
Multiracial	12,851	5.73%

=== 2020 census ===
As of the 2020 census, the county had a population of 216,403. The median age was 33.3 years. 20.9% of residents were under the age of 18 and 14.0% of residents were 65 years of age or older. For every 100 females there were 93.0 males, and for every 100 females age 18 and over there were 90.3 males age 18 and over.

The racial makeup of the county was 49.6% White, 2.8% Black or African American, 1.6% American Indian and Alaska Native, 14.0% Asian, 0.5% Native Hawaiian and Pacific Islander, 15.7% from some other race, and 15.8% from two or more races. Hispanic or Latino residents of any race comprised 33.1% of the population.

92.0% of residents lived in urban areas, while 8.0% lived in rural areas.

There were 76,594 households in the county, of which 32.0% had children under the age of 18 living with them and 28.5% had a female householder with no spouse or partner present. About 23.8% of all households were made up of individuals and 9.4% had someone living alone who was 65 years of age or older.

There were 80,188 housing units, of which 4.5% were vacant. Among occupied housing units, 53.0% were owner-occupied and 47.0% were renter-occupied. The homeowner vacancy rate was 0.9% and the rental vacancy rate was 3.5%.

=== Racial and ethnic composition ===
Yolo County, California – Racial and ethnic composition Note: the US Census treats Hispanic/Latino as an ethnic category. This table excludes Latinos from the racial categories and assigns them to a separate category. Hispanics/Latinos may be of any race.
Race / Ethnicity (NH = Non-Hispanic)	Pop 1980	Pop 1990	Pop 2000	Pop 2010	Pop 2020	% 1980	% 1990	% 2000	% 2010	% 2020
White alone (NH)	85,194	96,825	97,942	100,240	93,911	75.14%	68.63%	58.07%	49.91%	43.40%
Black or African American alone (NH)	1,886	2,975	3,133	4,752	5,722	1.66%	2.11%	1.86%	2.37%	2.64%
Native American or Alaska Native alone (NH)	1,206	1,363	1,165	1,098	948	1.06%	0.97%	0.69%	0.55%	0.44%
Asian alone (NH)	4,597	11,455	16,390	25,640	29,872	4.05%	8.12%	9.72%	12.77%	13.80%
Native Hawaiian or Pacific Islander alone (NH)	x	x	443	817	1,079	x	x	0.26%	0.41%	0.50%
Other race alone (NH)	1,149	292	396	443	1,278	1.01%	0.21%	0.23%	0.22%	0.59%
Mixed race or Multiracial (NH)	x	x	5,484	6,906	11,893	x	x	3.25%	3.44%	5.50%
Hispanic or Latino (any race)	19,342	28,182	43,707	60,953	71,700	17.06%	19.97%	25.91%	30.35%	33.13%
Total	113,374	141,092	168,660	200,849	216,403	100.00%	100.00%	100.00%	100.00%	100.00%

=== 2010 ===
The 2010 United States census reported that Yolo County had a population of 200,849. The racial makeup of Yolo County was 126,883 (63.2%) White, 5,208 (2.6%) African American, 2,214 (1.1%) Native American, 26,052 (13.0%) Asian, 910 (0.5%) Pacific Islander, 27,882 (13.9%) from other races, and 11,700 (5.8%) from two or more races. Hispanics or Latinos of any race were 60,953 persons (30.3%).

Population reported at 2010 United States census
The County	Total; Population	White	African; American	Native; American	Asian	Pacific; Islander	other races	two or more races	Hispanic or Latino (of any race)
Yolo County	200,849	126,883	5,208	2,214	26,052	910	27,882	11,700	60,953
Incorporated city	Total; Population	White	African; American	Native; American	Asian	Pacific; Islander	other races	two or more races	Hispanic or Latino (of any race)
Davis	65,622	42,571	1,528	339	14,355	136	3,121	3,572	8,172
West Sacramento	48,744	29,521	2,344	798	5,106	534	6,709	3,732	15,282
Winters	6,624	4,635	43	56	63	7	1,488	332	3,469
Woodland	55,468	34,904	855	726	3,458	169	12,488	2,868	26,289
Census-designated place	Total; Population	White	African; American	Native; American	Asian	Pacific; Islander	other races	two or more races	Hispanic or Latino (of any race)
Clarksburg	418	339	2	2	16	1	37	21	109
Dunnigan	1,416	836	107	25	19	1	339	89	583
Esparto	3,108	1,855	45	50	129	6	904	119	1,538
Guinda	254	175	26	0	1	1	43	8	68
Knights Landing	995	560	4	10	7	0	338	76	644
Madison	503	224	1	8	3	3	235	29	384
Monument Hills	1,542	1,163	20	32	77	17	153	80	403
University of California, Davis	5,786	2,443	144	22	2,443	7	364	363	728
Other unincorporated areas	Total; Population	White	African; American	Native; American	Asian	Pacific; Islander	other races	two or more races	Hispanic or Latino (of any race)
All others not CDPs (combined)	10,369	7,657	89	146	375	28	1,663	411	3,284

=== 2000 census ===
As of the census of 2000, 168,660 people, 59,375 households, and 37,465 families were residing in the county. The population density was 166 inhabitants per square mile (64/km^{2}). The 61,587 housing units had an average density of 61 per square mile (24/km^{2}). The racial makeup of the county was 67.7% White, 2.0% Black or African American, 1.2% Native American, 9.9% Asian, 0.3% Pacific Islander, 13.8% from other races, and 5.2% from two or more races. About 25.9% of the population were Hispanics or Latinos of any race. By ancestry, 10.0% were of German, 6.6% English and 6.4% Irish descent according to Census 2000. About 68.5% spoke English, 19.5% Spanish, 2.1% Chinese or Mandarin, and 1.8% Russian as their first language.

Of the 59,375 households, 33.6% had children under 18 living with them, 47.6% were married couples living together, 11.1% had a female householder with no husband present, and 36.9% were not families. About 23.3% of all households were made up of individuals, and 7.3% had someone living alone who was 65 or older. The average household size was 2.71 and the average family size was 3.25.

In the county, the age distribution was 25.2% under 18, 18.3% from 18 to 24, 28.2% from 25 to 44, 18.9% from 45 to 64, and 9.4% who were 65 or older. The median age was 30 years. For every 100 females, there were 95.6 males. For every 100 females 18 and over, there were 92.2 males.

The median income for a household in the county was $40,769, and for a family was $51,623. Males had a median income of $38,022 versus $30,687 for females. The per capita income for the county was $19,365. About 9.5% of families and 18.4% of the population were below the poverty line, including 16.0% of those under 18 and 7.4% of those 65 or over.

== Education ==
=== Public schools ===
The Yolo County Office of Education has supervision over public schools.

School districts covering portions of the county include:

- Davis Joint Unified School District
- Esparto Unified School District
- Pierce Joint Unified School District
- River Delta Joint Unified School District
- Washington Unified School District
- Winters Joint Unified School District
- Woodland Joint Unified School District

=== Colleges and universities ===
- University of California, Davis
- Woodland Community College

== Communities ==
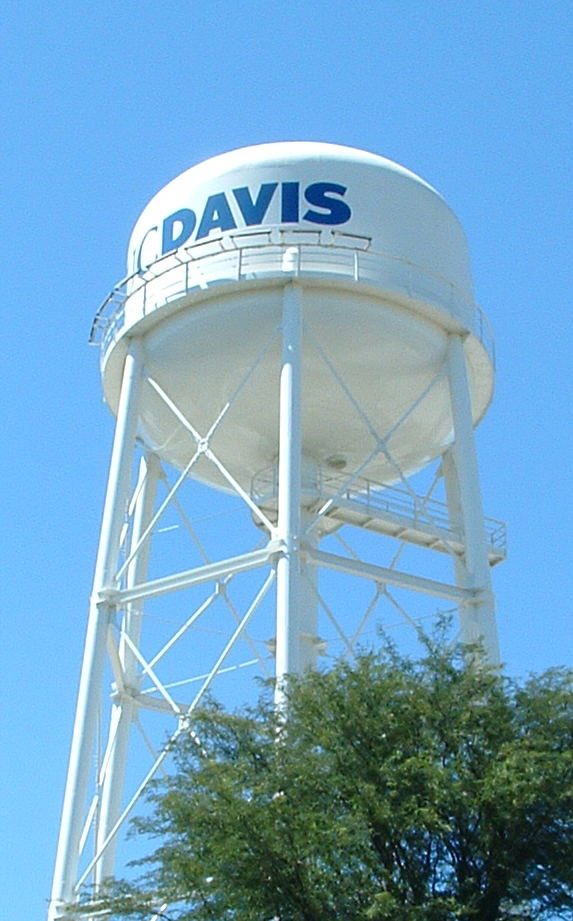
Water tower at University of California, Davis

=== Cities ===
- Davis
- West Sacramento
- Winters
- Woodland (county seat)

=== Census-designated places ===
- Brooks
- Clarksburg
- Dunnigan
- El Macero
- Esparto
- Guinda
- Knights Landing
- Madison
- Monument Hills
- Rumsey
- Tancred
- University of California-Davis
- Yolo

=== Other unincorporated communities ===
- Capay
- Plainfield
- Zamora
- Ronda is a former settlement that was located on the Southern Pacific Railroad 9.5 miles (15 km) southeast of Dunnigan, at an elevation of 59 feet (18 m). It still appeared on maps as of 1915.

=== Population ranking ===
The population ranking of the following table is based on the 2010 census of Yolo County.

† county seat

Rank	City/town/etc.	Municipal type	Population (2010 Census)
1	Davis	City	65,622
2	† Woodland	City	55,468
3	West Sacramento	City	48,744
4	Winters	City	6,624
5	University of California Davis	CDP	5,786
6	Esparto	CDP	3,108
7	Monument Hills	CDP	1,542
8	Dunnigan	CDP	1,416
9	Knights Landing	CDP	995
10	Madison	CDP	721
11	Yolo	CDP	450
12	Clarksburg	CDP	418
13	Guinda	CDP	254
14	Rumsey Indian Rancheria	AIAN	77

== See also ==
- 1892 Vacaville–Winters earthquakes
- List of school districts in Yolo County, California
- National Register of Historic Places listings in Yolo County, California
