= Madison, California =

Madison
- CDP
- Location in California
- Coordinates: 38°40′46″N 121°58′06″W
- Country: United States
- State: California
- County: Yolo

Area
  - Total: 1.546 sq mi (4.004 km^{2})
  - Land: 1.546 sq mi (4.004 km^{2})
  - Water: 0 sq mi (0 km^{2}) 0%
- Elevation: 151 ft (46 m)

Population (2020)
  - Total: 581
  - Density: 376/sq mi (145/km^{2})

Madison is a census-designated place in Yolo County, California, United States. Madison's ZIP Code is 95653 and its area code 530. It is located 10.5 miles (17 km) west of Woodland, at an elevation of 151 feet (46 m). The 2020 United States census reported Madison's population as 581.

== History ==
The Cache Creek post office opened in 1852, moved, and changed its name to Madison in 1877. The name was bestowed by Daniel Bradley Hulbert after his hometown, Madison, Wisconsin. The townsite was laid out and named "Madison" in 1877 when the railroad, the Vaca Valley and Clear Lake Railroad, reached that spot, as the terminus, after expanding north from Winters. The Cache Creek Post Office had been located in the settlement of Cottonwood, approximately one mile south of Madison. Many of Cottonwood's structures were then moved to Madison, as Cottonwood did not have a railroad stop. Madison was first featured on the map in 1951.

== Geography ==
According to the United States Census Bureau, the CDP covers an area of 1.546 square miles (4.004 km^{2}), all land.

== Demographics ==
Historical population
Census	Pop.	Note	%±
2010	503		—
2020	581		15.5%
U.S. Decennial Census; 1850–1870 1880-1890; 1900 1910 1920; 1930 1940 1950; 1960 1970 1980; 1990 2000 2010

Madison first appeared as a census designated place in the 2010 U.S. census.

The 2020 United States census reported that Madison had a population of 581. The population density was 375.8 inhabitants per square mile (145.1/km^{2}). The racial makeup of Madison was 159 (27.4%) White, 2 (0.3%) African American, 15 (2.6%) Native American, 5 (0.9%) Asian, 3 (0.5%) Pacific Islander, 209 (36.0%) from other races, and 188 (32.4%) from two or more races. Hispanic or Latino of any race were 512 persons (88.1%).

The census reported that 580 people (99.8% of the population) lived in households, 1 person (0.2%) lived in non-institutionalized group quarters, and no one was institutionalized.

There were 151 households, out of which 69 (45.7%) had children under the age of 18 living in them, 98 (64.9%) were married-couple households, 11 (7.3%) were cohabiting couple households, 27 (17.9%) had a female householder with no partner present, and 15 (9.9%) had a male householder with no partner present. 17 households (11.3%) were one person, and 12 (7.9%) were one person aged 65 or older. The average household size was 3.84. There were 121 families (80.1% of all households).

The age distribution was 173 people (29.8%) under the age of 18, 71 people (12.2%) aged 18 to 24, 128 people (22.0%) aged 25 to 44, 134 people (23.1%) aged 45 to 64, and 75 people (12.9%) who were 65 years of age or older. The median age was 31.8 years. For every 100 females, there were 113.6 males.

There were 159 housing units at an average density of 102.8 units per square mile (39.7 units/km^{2}), of which 151 (95.0%) were occupied. Of these, 108 (71.5%) were owner-occupied, and 43 (28.5%) were occupied by renters.

== Education ==
Madison is served by the Esparto Unified School District.
