= Rumsey, California =

- Unincorporated community Census-designated place
- Location in California Rumsey, California (the United States)
- Coordinates: 38°53′24.74″N 122°14′25.62″W
- Country: United States
- State: California
- County: Yolo

Area
  - Total: 2.532 sq mi (6.56 km^{2})
  - Land: 2.447 sq mi (6.34 km^{2})
  - Water: 0.085 sq mi (0.22 km^{2})
- Elevation: 423 ft (129 m)

Population (2020)
  - Total: 91
  - Density: 37/sq mi (14/km^{2})
- Time zone: UTC-8 (Pacific)
  - Summer (DST): UTC-7 (PDT)
- GNIS feature ID: 2805251

Rumsey is an unincorporated community and census-designated place (CDP) in Yolo County, California, United States. As of the 2020 census, Rumsey had a population of 91. It is located 18 miles (29 km) northwest of Esparto, in the Capay Valley, in the northwestern part of the county. Rumsey's ZIP Code is 95679 and its area code 530. It lies at an elevation of 420 feet (128 m).

== History ==
A post office was erected in 1878 near the Rumsey community, but it was named "Rock". In 1888 it was moved two miles north to the terminus of the Vaca Valley and Clear Lake Railroad, and the name was changed to "Rumsey". The name "Rock" was after a rock landmark, and the name "Rumsey" was given after Captain D.C. Rumsey who owned the land at the time.

Cache Creek was temporarily blocked north of Rumsey by a landslide caused by the 1906 San Francisco earthquake: "Our Rumsey correspondent mentions the fall of Cache Creek as a result of an earthquake shock Tuesday night. The water has continued to fall some since that date and in some places it is dry. Upon investigation by the officials of the Water Company it was found that a landslide had dammed the Creek near the Leonard ranch in Lake county...." The creek subsequently broke through, causing severe flooding in Rumsey.

== Demographics ==
Historical population
Census	Pop.	Note	%±
2020	91		—
U.S. Decennial Census; 1850–1870 1880-1890; 1900 1910 1920; 1930 1940 1950; 1960 1970 1980; 1990 2000 2010; 2020

Rumsey first appeared as a census designated place in the 2020 U.S. census.

=== 2020 Census ===
Rumsey CDP, California – Racial and ethnic composition Note: the US Census treats Hispanic/Latino as an ethnic category. This table excludes Latinos from the racial categories and assigns them to a separate category. Hispanics/Latinos may be of any race.
Race / Ethnicity (NH = Non-Hispanic)	Pop 2020	% 2020
White alone (NH)	68	74.73%
Black or African American alone (NH)	0	0.00%
Native American or Alaska Native alone (NH)	0	0.00%
Asian alone (NH)	0	0.00%
Pacific Islander alone (NH)	1	1.10%
Other race alone (NH)	0	0.00%
Mixed race or Multiracial (NH)	7	7.69%
Hispanic or Latino (any race)	15	16.48%
Total	91	100.00%

== Education ==
The CDP is served by the Esparto Unified School District.
