= Esparto, California =

Esparto
- census-designated place
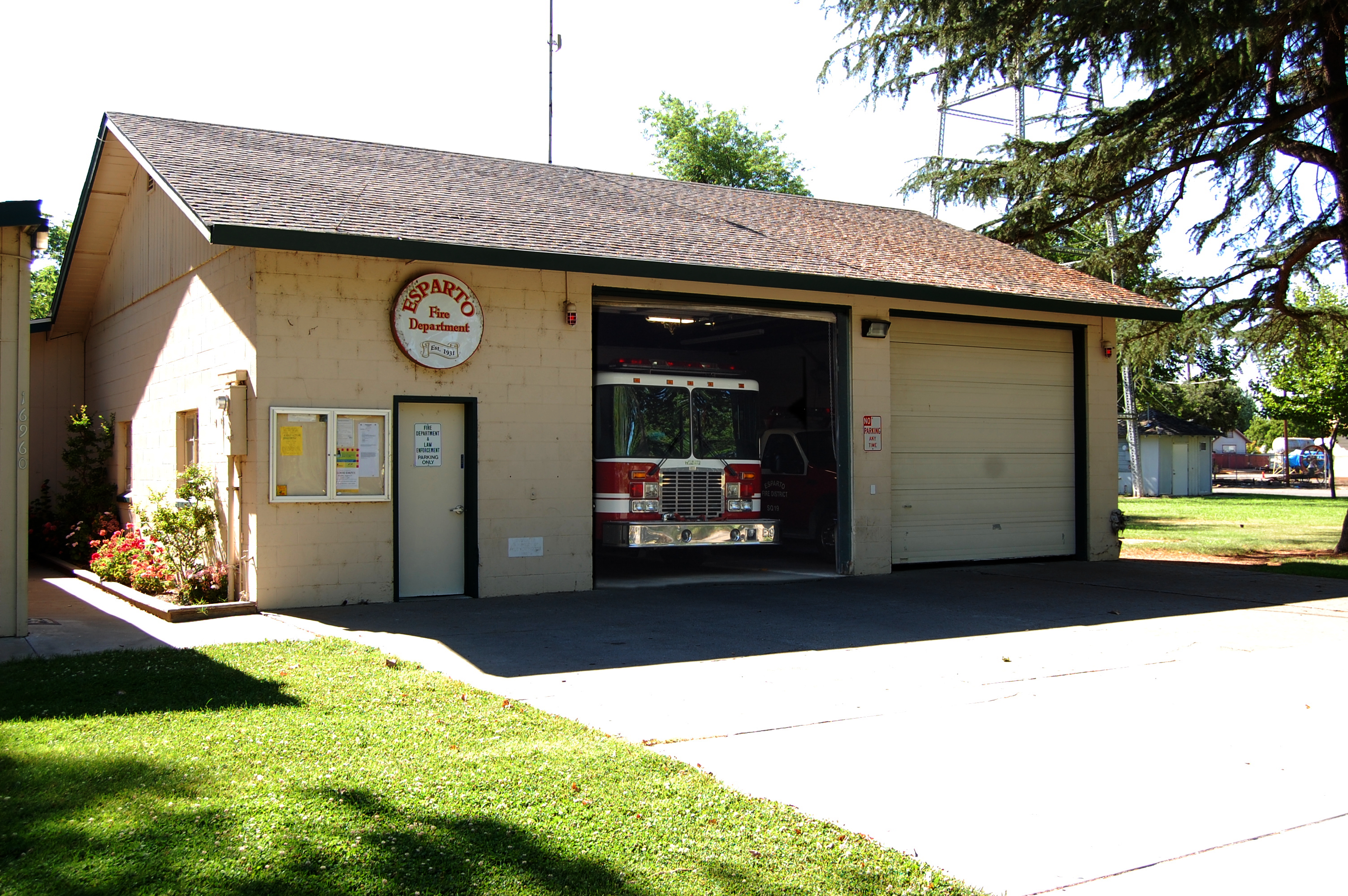
- The Esparto Fire Department station in downtown
- Nickname: E-Town
- Location in Yolo County and the state of California
- Coordinates: 38°41′35″N 122°1′8″W
- Country: United States
- State: California
- County: Yolo

Government
  - State Senate: Christopher Cabaldon (D)
  - State Assembly: Cecilia Aguiar-Curry (D)
  - U. S. Congress: Mike Thompson (D)

Area
  - Total: 4.601 sq mi (11.917 km^{2})
  - Land: 4.601 sq mi (11.917 km^{2})
  - Water: 0 sq mi (0 km^{2})
- Elevation: 190 ft (58 m)

Population (2020)
  - Total: 3,572
  - Density: 776.3/sq mi (299.7/km^{2})
- Time zone: UTC-8 (PST)
  - Summer (DST): UTC-7 (PDT)
- ZIP codes: 95627
- Area code: 530
- FIPS code: 06-22846
- GNIS feature ID: 0277508

Esparto (Spanish for "Halfah grass") is a census-designated place (CDP) in Yolo County, California, United States. It is part of the Sacramento–Arden-Arcade–Roseville Metropolitan Statistical Area. The population was 3,572 at the 2020 census.

== History ==
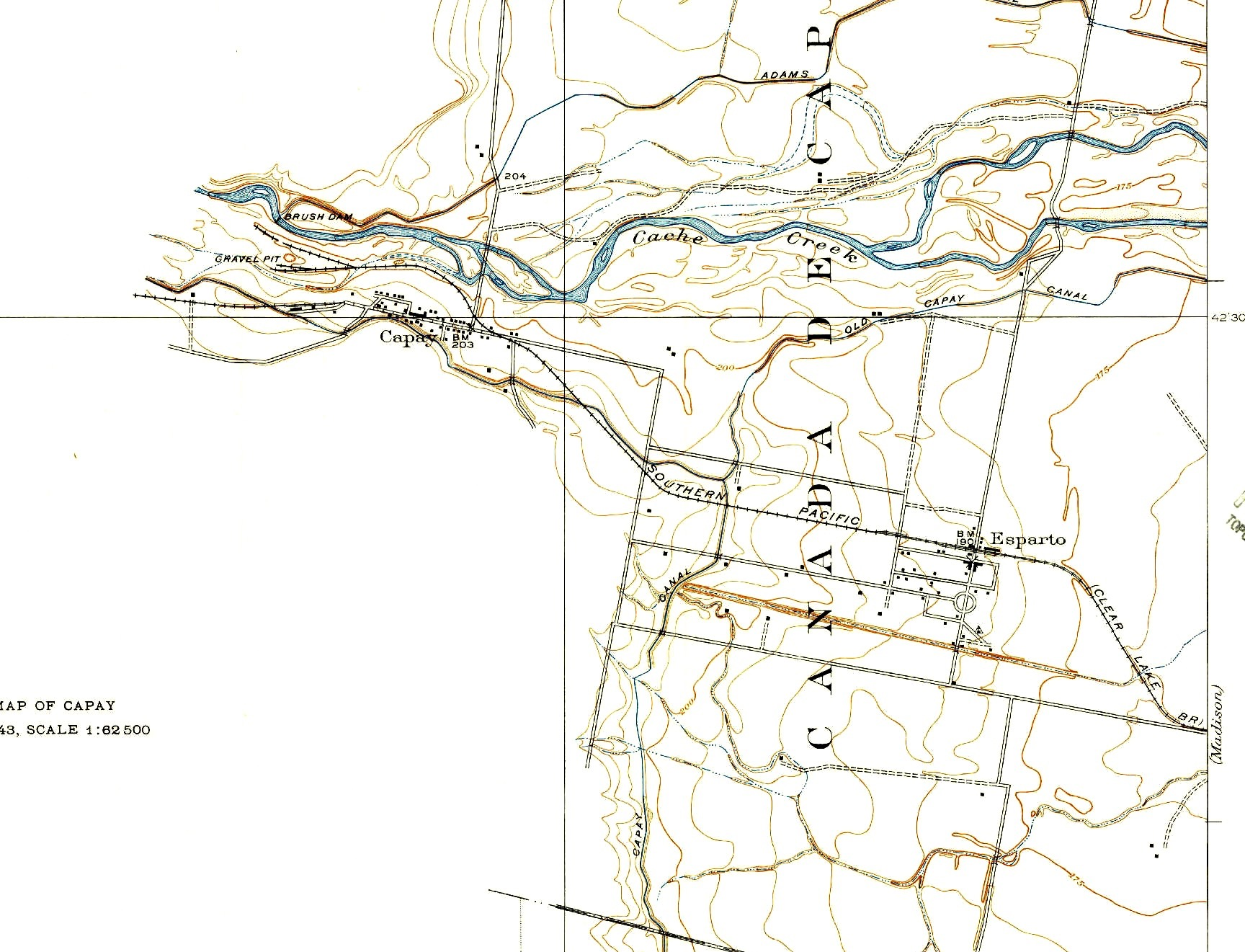
Rumsey Branch of SP in 1905 at Capay and Esparto

Vaca Valley Railroad officials gave the name Esperanza ("hope" in Spanish) to their new townsite in 1888, but when the post office was established in 1890 the name had to be changed because there was already an Esperanza in Tulare County. The name Esparto was chosen as the new name, and it means "feather grass" (Stipa tenacissima) in Spanish. In 1888 Esparto was laid with track from the Vaca Valley Railroad (later consolidated into the Southern Pacific Railroad) that trailed to Rumsey. In 1893, Yolo County's second high school was established in the town of Esparto, Esparto High School, but a building for it was not built until 1918.

The Vaca Valley Railroad began in 1937 to remove track from Rumsey to Esparto, stopping train service northwest of Esparto in 1941. The passenger service from Esparto to Elmira was officially discontinued in 1957. Voters approved the formation of a school district in 1959–60 that encompass the Capay Valley. Another major win for the community was the successful fundraising for the Esparto Regional Library Branch of the Yolo County Library in 1999.

A local quarry was used in 2009 by the MythBusters to test the "Knock Your Socks off" myth. A large ANFO explosion was detonated which caused damage and much local complaint as described in the episode "Location, Location, Location". According to Grant Imahara, who was part of the team performing the test, the MythBusters have been unable to set foot into Esparto following the incident.

On July 1, 2025, a fireworks facility in Esparto caught fire and exploded, killing seven people and injuring two more.

== Education ==
The CDP is served by the Esparto Unified School District.

Esparto currently has four schools: Esparto Elementary School, Esparto Middle School, Esparto High School, and Madison High School.

== Geography ==
Esparto is located at 38°41′35″N 122°01′08″W.

According to the United States Census Bureau, the CDP has a total area of 4.6 square miles (12 km^{2}), all land.

== Demographics ==
Historical population
Census	Pop.	Note	%±
1970	1,088		—
1980	1,303		19.8%
1990	1,487		14.1%
2000	1,858		24.9%
2010	3,108		67.3%
2020	3,572		14.9%
U.S. Decennial Census; 1850–1870 1880-1890; 1900 1910 1920; 1930 1940 1950; 1960 1970 1980; 1990 2000 2010

Esparto first appeared as an unincorporated place in the 1970 U.S. census; and a census designated place in the 2010 U.S. census.

=== 2020 census ===
As of the 2020 census, Esparto had a population of 3,572. The population density was 776.4 inhabitants per square mile (299.8/km^{2}). The median age was 34.6 years; 27.7% of residents were under the age of 18 and 14.0% were 65 years of age or older. For every 100 females, there were 95.2 males, and for every 100 females age 18 and over, there were 96.6 males.

0.0% of residents lived in urban areas, while 100.0% lived in rural areas.

Racial composition as of the 2020 census
Race	Number	Percent
White	1,606	45.0%
Black or African American	99	2.8%
American Indian and Alaska Native	95	2.7%
Asian	92	2.6%
Native Hawaiian and Other Pacific Islander	3	0.1%
Some other race	959	26.8%
Two or more races	718	20.1%
Hispanic or Latino (of any race)	2,038	57.1%

The whole population lived in households. There were 1,108 households, of which 40.0% included children under the age of 18. Of all households, 54.5% were married-couple households, 6.3% were cohabiting couple households, 23.6% had a female householder with no spouse or partner present, and 15.6% had a male householder with no spouse or partner present. About 20.0% of households were one person, and 11.2% were one person aged 65 or older. The average household size was 3.22. There were 833 families (75.2% of all households).

There were 1,148 housing units at an average density of 249.5 units per square mile (96.3 units/km^{2}), of which 1,108 (96.5%) were occupied. Of the occupied units, 72.2% were owner-occupied and 27.8% were occupied by renters. The vacancy rate was 3.5%; the homeowner vacancy rate was 0.5% and the rental vacancy rate was 6.4%.

=== Income and poverty ===
In 2023, the US Census Bureau estimated that the median household income was $104,706, and the per capita income was $32,460. About 10.0% of families and 13.6% of the population were below the poverty line.

=== 2010 census ===
At the 2010 census Esparto had a population of 3,108, a significant increase from its 2000 census population of 1,858. The population density was 675.5 inhabitants per square mile (260.8/km^{2}). The racial makeup of Esparto was 1,855 (59.7%) White, 45 (1.4%) African American, 50 (1.6%) Native American, 129 (4.2%) Asian, 6 (0.2%) Pacific Islander, 904 (29.1%) from other races, and 119 (3.8%) from two or more races. Hispanic or Latino of any race were 1,538 persons (49.5%).

The whole population lived in households, no one lived in non-institutionalized group quarters and no one was institutionalized.

There were 974 households, 421 (43.2%) had children under the age of 18 living in them, 560 (57.5%) were opposite-sex married couples living together, 121 (12.4%) had a female householder with no husband present, 66 (6.8%) had a male householder with no wife present. There were 62 (6.4%) unmarried opposite-sex partnerships, and 4 (0.4%) same-sex married couples or partnerships. 172 households (17.7%) were one person and 76 (7.8%) had someone living alone who was 65 or older. The average household size was 3.19. There were 747 families (76.7% of households); the average family size was 3.63.

The age distribution was 888 people (28.6%) under the age of 18, 322 people (10.4%) aged 18 to 24, 817 people (26.3%) aged 25 to 44, 763 people (24.5%) aged 45 to 64, and 318 people (10.2%) who were 65 or older. The median age was 33.1 years. For every 100 females, there were 100.5 males. For every 100 females age 18 and over, there were 102.2 males.

There were 1,055 housing units at an average density of 229.3 per square mile, of the occupied units 689 (70.7%) were owner-occupied and 285 (29.3%) were rented. The homeowner vacancy rate was 2.3%; the rental vacancy rate was 5.0%. 2,149 people (69.1% of the population) lived in owner-occupied housing units and 959 people (30.9%) lived in rental housing units.
