= List of buildings designed by W. H. Weeks =

During his career, W. H. Weeks designed hundreds of buildings throughout California, as well as some in Oregon and Nevada. This is a list of some of the buildings that he designed.

Year Completed	Name	Location	Type	Still in Use	Ref(s)
1924	Santa Barbara High School	Santa Barbara, California	School	Yes	
1932	Santa Barbara Junior High School	Santa Barbara, California	School	Yes	
1927	La Cumbre Elementary School	Santa Barbara, California	School	Yes	
1913	First National Bank	Arcata, California	Bank		
1908	Bay View School	Santa Cruz, California	School	No (1957)	
1923	Burlingame High School	Burlingame, California	School	Yes	
1906	Boulder Creek High School	Boulder Creek, California	School	No (1946)	
1910	Convention Hall	Monterey, California	Commercial		
1909	Bank of Monterey	Monterey, California	Commercial		
1906	Goldstine Block (Monterey Hotel), 406 Alvarado	Monterey, California	Commercial	Yes	
1912	Underwood Building, 416 Alvarado	Monterey, California	Commercial	Yes	
1905	Opera House	Monterey, California	Commercial	No	
1914	Branciforte Elementary School	Santa Cruz, California	School	Yes	
1915	Santa Cruz High School	Santa Cruz, California	School	Yes	
1933	1116 Laurent Street	Santa Cruz, California	Domestic	Yes	
1915	1135 N. Branciforte Avenue	Santa Cruz, California	Domestic	Yes	
1907	1220 Pacific Ave. Masonic Hall (remodel)	Santa Cruz, California	Commercial	No	
1907	240 West Cliff Drive	Santa Cruz, California	Domestic	No	
1906	325 Laurent Street	Santa Cruz, California	Domestic	Yes	
1909	343 High Street	Santa Cruz, California	Domestic	Yes	
1908	316 Escalona Drive	Santa Cruz, California	Domestic	Yes	
1933	662 Escalona Drive	Santa Cruz, California	Domestic	Yes	
1911	314 West Cliff Drive	Santa Cruz, California	Domestic	Yes	
1930	Laurel School, 301 Center St.	Santa Cruz, California	School	Yes	
1906	Leask's Department Store	Santa Cruz, California	Commercial	No	
1915	East Cliff and Seabright Library	Santa Cruz, California	Library	Yes	
1922–23	120 Green Street	Santa Cruz, California	Domestic	Yes	
1904	Santa Cruz Main Carnegie Library	Santa Cruz, California	Library	No	
1933	P.T. Phillips House, 1116 Laurent St	Santa Cruz, California	Domestic	Yes	
1915	Santa Cruz East Cliff Carnegie Library	Santa Cruz, California	Library	No	
1915	Santa Cruz Garfield Park Carnegie Library	Santa Cruz, California	Library	Yes	
1907	Cocoanut Grove	Santa Cruz, California	Ballroom	Yes	
1928	Palomar Hotel	Santa Cruz, California	Commercial	Yes	
1910	People's Bank	Santa Cruz, California	Commercial	Yes	
1921	Soquel Grammar School	Soquel, California	School	Yes	
1922	Campbell Union Grammar School	Campbell, California	School	Yes	
1938	Campbell High School	Campbell, California	School	Yes	
1915	Eureka High School	Eureka, California	School		Yes
1925	Fremont High School	Sunnyvale, California	School	Yes	
1931	Herbert Hoover Junior High School	San Jose, California	School		
1926	Jean Harvey School	Walnut Grove, California	School		
1925	Los Gatos High School	Los Gatos, California	School	Yes	
1921	Piedmont High School	Piedmont, California	School	No	
1921	Big Pine School	Big Pine, California	School		
	Owens Valley School	Independence, California	School		
1920s	Santa Rosa High School	Santa Rosa, California	School	Yes	
1916	San Luis Obispo High School	San Luis Obispo, California	School		
1922	Turlock High School	Turlock, California	School		
1917	Tracy High School	Tracy, California	School		
1916	Walnut Street School	Woodland, California	School		
ca 1925	Napa Union High School	Napa, California	School		
	Morgan Hill School	Morgan Hill, California	School		
	Lemoore Union High School	Lemoore, California	School		
1916	Winters High School	Winters, California	School		
1924	Woodland Grammar School	Woodland, California	School		
1913	Woodland High School (first construction)	Woodland, California	School		
1915	Woodland Primary School	Woodland, California	School		
1927	M.R. Trace School	San Jose, California	School		
1927	Old Berryessa Elementary School	Berryessa, San Jose, California	School	No	
1925	Woodrow Wilson Junior High School	San Jose, California	School		
1926	Theodore Roosevelt Junior High School	San Jose, California	School		
1917	Bayliss Carnegie Library	Glenn, California	Library		
1910	Gilroy Carnegie Library	Gilroy, California	Library		
1911	Livermore Carnegie Library	Livermore, California	Library		
1911	Lompoc Carnegie Library	Lompoc, California	Library		
1911	Monterey Carnegie Library	Monterey, California	Library		
1907	Nevada City Carnegie Library	Nevada City, California	Library		
1915	Oakland Melrose Branch Carnegie Library	Oakland, California	Library		
1915	Orland Carnegie Library	Orland, California	Library		
1912	Oroville Carnegie Library	Oroville, California	Library		
1910	Masonic Temple	Palo Alto, California	Commercial	No (1972)	
1908	Paso Robles Carnegie Library	Paso Robles, California	Library		
1910	Richmond Carnegie Library	Richmond, California	Library		
1912	Roseville Carnegie Library	Roseville, California	Library		
1909	San Leandro Carnegie Library	San Leandro, California	Library		
1910	Daniel Best Building	San Leandro, California	Commercial		
1905	San Luis Obispo Carnegie Library	San Luis Obispo, California	Library		
1920	South San Francisco Carnegie Library	South San Francisco, California	Library		
1905	Watsonville Carnegie Library	Watsonville, California	Library		
1905	Woodland Carnegie Library	Woodland, California	Library		
1917	Yolo Library	Yolo, California	Library		
1915	Yreka Carnegie Library	Yreka, California	Library		
1920 (subsequent additions in 1922, 1928)	Woodland Clinic Hospital and Clinic Facilities	Woodland, California	Hospital		
1916	Winters City Hall	Winters, California	City hall		
1913	First Christian Church	Winters, California	Religious		
1922	Inyo County Courthouse	Independence, California	Courthouse		
1917	Yolo County Courthouse	Woodland, California	Courthouse		
1915	Yolo County Jail	Woodland, California	Jail		
1921	Rebekah Children Services	Gilroy, California	Other		
1920	Yolo Fliers Clubhouse	Yolo County, California	Other		
1926	Woodland Elks Lodge	Woodland, California	Lodge		
1905	Pacific Grove Masonic Lodge	Pacific Grove, California	Lodge		
1903	Bank of Woodland	Woodland, California	Bank		
1903	Yolo County Savings Bank	Woodland, California	Bank		
1928	Bishop Berkeley Apartments	Berkeley, California	Commercial	Yes	
1923	Elmwood Hardware Building	Berkeley, California	Commercial		
1896	Professor Hoss House	Berkeley, California	Domestic		
1911	Foskett and Elworthy Building	Concord, California	Commercial		
1928	Hotel Durant	Berkeley, California	Commercial	Yes	
1928	Hotel Woodland	Woodland, California	Commercial		
1921	Milias Hotel	Gilroy, California	Commercial		
1913	Porter Building	Woodland, California	Commercial		
1898	Spreckels Sugar Company Beet Factory	Spreckels, California	Commercial		
1928	First Christian Church	Oakland, California	Religious		
1919	J.I. McConnell Home	Woodland, California	Domestic		
1897	Tuttle Mansion	Watsonville, California	Domestic		
1898	W. H. Weeks House	Salinas, California	Domestic		
1898	J.H. McDougall Building	Salinas, California	Office		
1900	Frankie Orr House	Hollister, California	Domestic	Yes	
Circa 1908	City Hall	Hollister, California	Office		
1907	Masonic Temple	Hollister, California	Lodge		
1903	California Polytechnic School, Building #1	San Luis Obispo, California	School		
1903	California Polytechnic School, Building #2	San Luis Obispo, California	School		
1902	California Polytechnic School, Powerhouse	San Luis Obispo, California	School		
1906	California Polytechnic School, Household Arts	San Luis Obispo, California	School		
1924	Masonic Building	Red Bluff, California	Lodge		
1923	Pomona High School #2	Pomona, California	School		
1926	San Mateo Union High School	San Mateo, California	School		
1911	Appleton Hotel	Watsonville, California	Hotel		
1927	Resetar Hotel	Watsonville, California	Hotel		
1928	Wheeler Hospital	Gilroy, California	Hospital		
1892	1st Christian Church #1	Watsonville, California	Church		
1903	1st Christian Church #3	Watsonville, California	Church		
1929	1st Christian Church #4	Watsonville, California	Church		
1894	Julius Lee House	Watsonville, California	Domestic	Yes	
1897	James Redman House	Watsonville, California	Domestic		
1900	Samuel M. Black House	Salinas, California	Domestic		
1911	George Wood House (Woodleigh)	Saratoga, California	Domestic		
1922	William H. Weeks House	Piedmont, California	Domestic		
	Edgar and Dora Ellis Holloway House	Gilroy, California	Domestic		
1927	Medico-Dental Building	San Jose, California	Commercial	Yes	
1930	De Anza Hotel	San Jose, California	Hotel	Yes	
1920	Bank of Tracy	Tracy, California	Commercial	Yes	
1928	Hotel Vincent	Gonzales, California	Hotel	No	
1937	Mariposa County High School	Mariposa, California	School	Yes	
