= National Register of Historic Places listings in Siskiyou County, California =

Location of Siskiyou County in California

This is a list of the National Register of Historic Places listings in Siskiyou County, California.

This is intended to be a complete list of the properties and districts on the National Register of Historic Places in Siskiyou County, California, United States. Latitude and longitude coordinates are provided for many National Register properties and districts; these locations may be seen together in an online map.

There are 21 properties and districts listed on the National Register in the county, including 1 National Historic Landmark.

This National Park Service list is complete through NPS recent listings posted September 4, 2026.

== Current listings ==
	Name on the Register	Image	Date listed	Location	City or town	Description
1	Camp Tulelake	Camp Tulelake	March 12, 2018 (#100002176)	Hill R., 2 mi. S of jct. with CA 161, Tule Lake National Monument; 41°58′09″N 121°33′56″W	Tulelake	Originally a Civilian Conservation Corps camp established in 1935. During World War II, a maximum security prison camp for incarcerating dissident interned Japanese Americans (1943) and German prisoners of war (1944–1946).
2	Captain Jack's Stronghold	Captain Jack's Stronghold	September 20, 1973 (#73000259)	S of Tulelake, Lava Beds National Monument; 41°49′18″N 121°30′18″W	Tulelake	
3	Dunsmuir Historic Commercial District	Dunsmuir Historic Commercial District	November 10, 1982 (#82000993)	Roughly bounded by Sacramento and Shasta Aves., Spruce and Cedar Sts. (both sides); 41°12′37″N 122°16′16″W	Dunsmuir	
4	Edgewood Store	Edgewood Store	March 10, 2004 (#04000140)	24505 Edgewood Rd. 41°27′28″N 122°25′52″W	Edgewood	
5	Lewis Falkenstein House	Lewis Falkenstein House	December 31, 1979 (#79000554)	401 S. Gold Street; 41°43′48″N 122°38′30″W	Yreka	
6	Forest House	Forest House	July 14, 2011 (#11000433)	4204 California State Route 3; 41°40′24″N 122°41′09″W	Yreka	Center of Forest House Ranch, and a stagecoach stop and travelers' rest on old private toll road.
7	Fort Jones House	Fort Jones House	April 22, 1976 (#76000533)	Main St. 41°36′19″N 122°50′28″W	Fort Jones	
8	William Harlow Cabin		June 3, 1991 (#91000699)	Elliot Cr. Rd. No. 1050, 1 mi. from Joe Bar Subdivision; 41°59′59″N 123°06′04″W	Seiad Valley	
9	Hospital Rock Army Camp Site	Hospital Rock Army Camp Site	October 2, 1973 (#73000227)	S of Tulelake, Lava Beds National Monument; 41°49′45″N 121°28′31″W	Tulelake	
10	Hotel Macdoel		February 11, 1982 (#82002275)	Montezuma Ave. and Mt. Shasta St. 41°49′43″N 122°00′10″W	Macdoel	
11	Lava Beds National Monument Archeological District	Lava Beds National Monument Archeological District	March 21, 1991 (#75002182)	Address Restricted	Tulelake	
12	Lower Klamath National Wildlife Refuge	Lower Klamath National Wildlife Refuge	October 15, 1966 (#66000238)	Lower Klamath Lake, east of Dorris; 41°56′48″N 121°39′53″W	Dorris	Extends into Klamath County, Oregon. This national wildlife refuge, established in 1908, was the first large block of public land set aside for wildlife management purposes. Because of its origins in the Klamath Basin reclamation project, it became an ongoing example of the tensions between conservation and commercial demands in public land management.
13	McCloud	McCloud	March 16, 1990 (#90000444)	Roughly bounded by Columbero Dr., Main St., W. Minnesota Ave., and Lawndale Ct. 41°15′16″N 122°08′18″W	McCloud	
14	Sawyers Bar Catholic Church	Sawyers Bar Catholic Church	July 7, 1978 (#78000792)	Klamath National Forest; 41°18′03″N 123°08′10″W	Sawyers Bar	
15	Schonchin Butte Fire Lookout	Schonchin Butte Fire Lookout	September 5, 2017 (#100001559)	Lava Beds National Monument; 41°44′17″N 121°31′45″W	Tulelake	
16	Shasta Inn and Weed Lumber Company Boarding House	Shasta Inn and Weed Lumber Company Boarding House	November 10, 1980 (#80000869)	829 and 877 N. Davis St. 41°25′53″N 122°22′48″W	Weed	Neither building is extant.
17	Thomas-Wright Battle Site		November 15, 1978 (#78000366)	S of Tulelake in Lava Beds National Monument; 41°46′13″N 121°31′25″W	Tulelake	
18	Upper Klamath River Stateline Archaeological District		July 10, 2017 (#100001283)	Address restricted	Beswick	
19	West Miner Street-Third Street Historic District	West Miner Street-Third Street Historic District	December 11, 1972 (#72000258)	102-402 W. Miner St. and 122-419 3rd St. 41°44′01″N 122°38′07″W	Yreka	
20	White's Gulch Arrastra		December 22, 1978 (#78000793)	E of Swayers Bar; 41°16′53″N 123°04′31″W	Sawyers Bar	
21	Yreka Carnegie Library	Yreka Carnegie Library	March 26, 1992 (#92000270)	412 W. Miner St. 41°43′57″N 122°38′17″W	Yreka	

== See also ==
- List of National Historic Landmarks in California
- National Register of Historic Places listings in California
- California Historical Landmarks in Siskiyou County, California
