= Yreka Carnegie Library =

- U.S. National Register of Historic Places
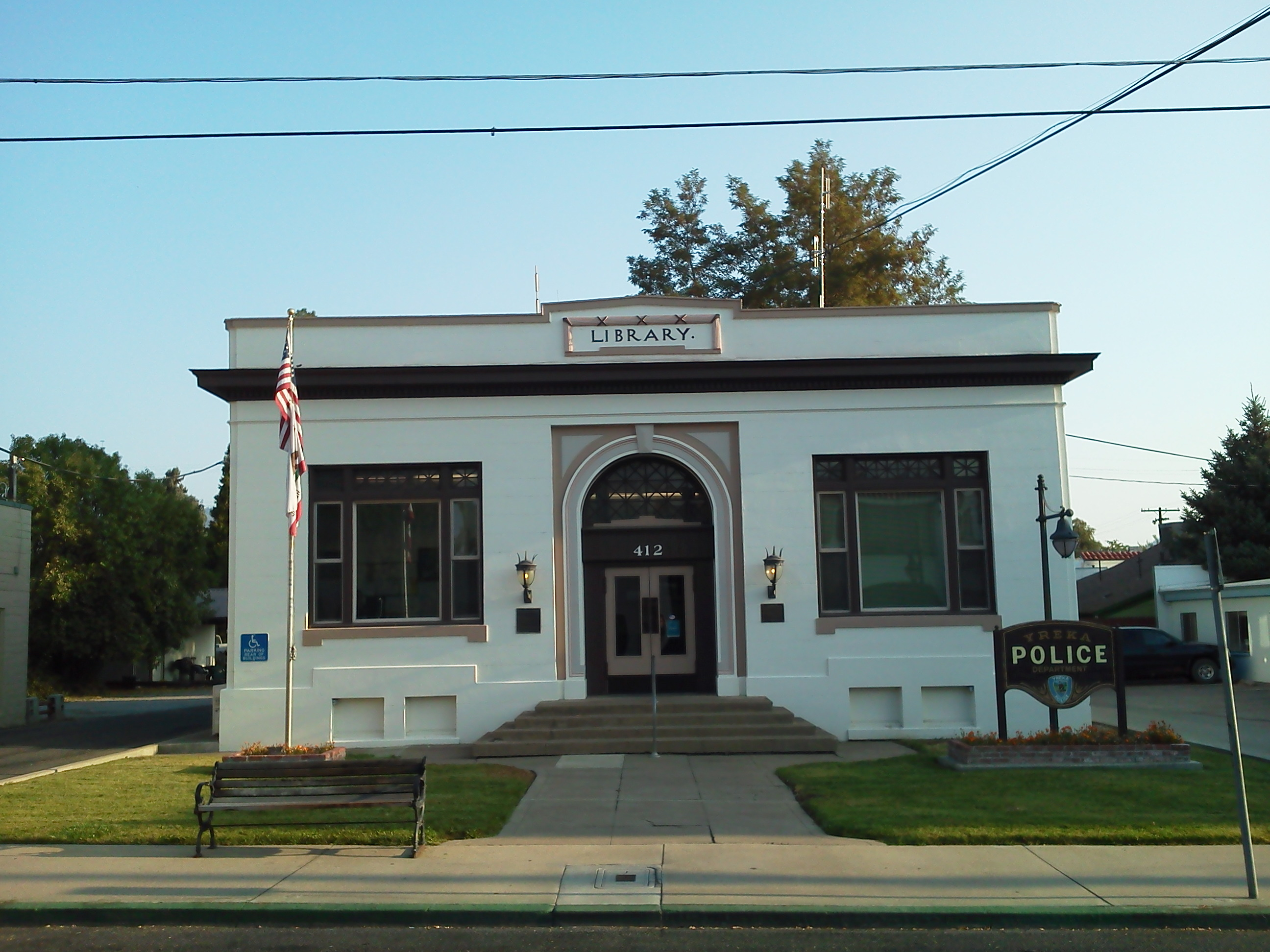
- The library building in September 2012

- Location within California Location within the United States
- Location: 412 W. Miner Street, Yreka, California
- Coordinates: 41°43′57″N 122°38′17″W
- Area: less than one acre
- Built: 1915
- Architect: W. H. Weeks
- Architectural style: Classical Revival
- MPS: California Carnegie Libraries MPS
- NRHP reference No.: 92000270
- Added to NRHP: March 26, 1992

The Yreka Carnegie Library is a building located in Yreka, California, in the United States. Formerly used as a library building, it now houses the Yreka Police Department. The one-story building, designed by W. H. Weeks and completed in 1915, exhibits Classical Revival architecture. It was added to the National Register of Historic Places in 1992.

== See also ==
- List of buildings designed by W. H. Weeks
- National Register of Historic Places listings in Siskiyou County, California
