= Samuel M. Black House =

Historic house in California, United States

- U.S. National Register of Historic Places
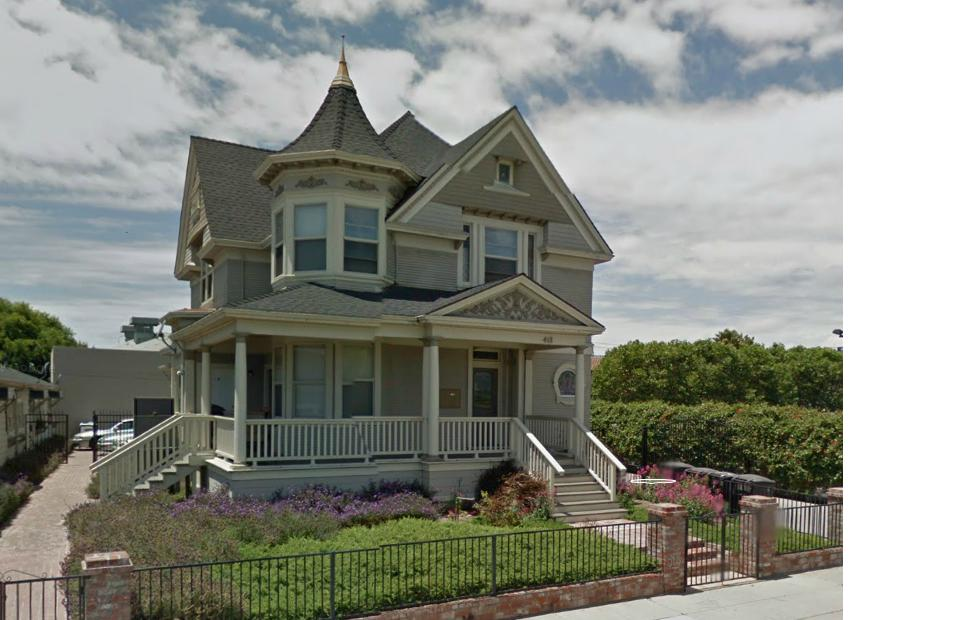
- House in 2012

- Location within California Location within the United States
- Location: 418 Pajaro St., Salinas, California
- Coordinates: 36°40′18″N 121°39′4″W
- Area: 0.3 acres (0.12 ha)
- Built: 1900
- Architect: Weeks, William Henry
- Architectural style: Queen Anne
- NRHP reference No.: 84000911
- Added to NRHP: September 20, 1984

The Samuel M. Black House, located at 418 Pajaro St. in Salinas, California, is a historic Queen Anne style house that is listed on the National Register of Historic Places.

It was designed by architect William Henry Weeks and was built in 1900. The house is significant for its association with Samuel M. Black, a civic leader in the development of Monterey County, and architecturally for its serving as an early prototype of the "Modified Colonial" architecture style in development by Weeks. At the time of its NRHP nomination, the house was unique in being intact architecturally plus having the only known set of architect Weeks' plans and elevations for a house of this period; it was expected to yield further architectural history development. The house is termed a conservative one of Weeks' residential designs.

The property includes an eight-bedroom, one-story farmworkers quarters that was designed and built by a local contractor in 1936 for $6,000.

The property was listed on the National Register of Historic Places in 1984. The listing included two contributing buildings.
