= McCloud, California =

McCloud
- census-designated place
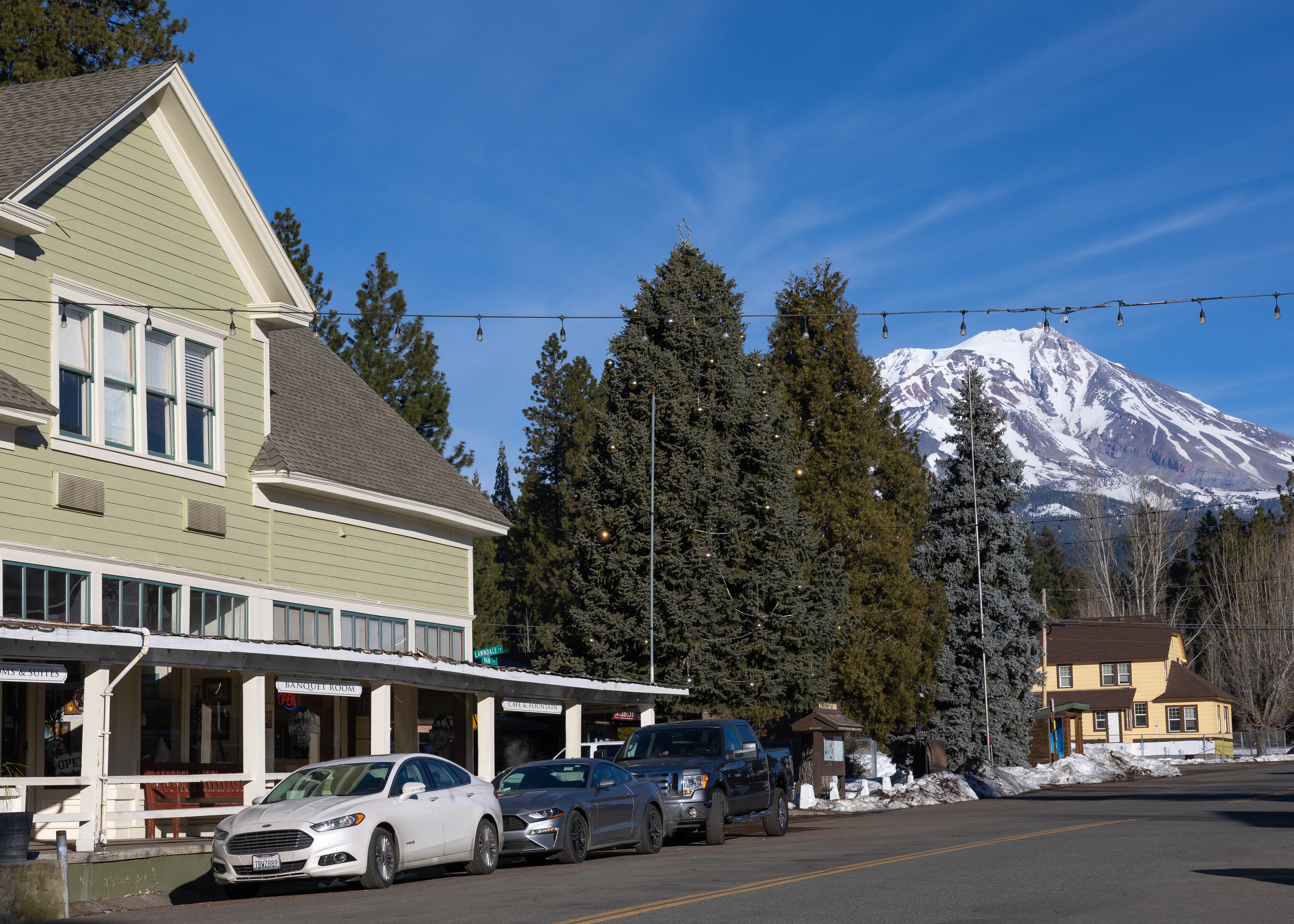
- McCloud with Mount Shasta in the background, January 2022

- Location in Siskiyou County and the state of California

- Location in the United States
- Coordinates: 41°15′17″N 122°8′11″W
- Country: United States of America
- State: California
- County: Siskiyou

Area
  - Total: 2.488 sq mi (6.444 km^{2})
  - Land: 2.422 sq mi (6.274 km^{2})
  - Water: 0.066 sq mi (0.171 km^{2}) 2.65%
- Elevation: 3,271 ft (997 m)

Population (2020)
  - Total: 945
  - Density: 390/sq mi (151/km^{2})
- Time zone: UTC−8 (Pacific (PST))
  - Summer (DST): UTC−7 (PDT)
- ZIP Code: 96057
- Area code: 530
- FIPS code: 06-44784
- GNIS feature ID: 0277555

McCloud is an unincorporated community and census-designated place (CDP) in Siskiyou County, California, United States. Its population is 945 as of the 2020 census, down from 1,101 from the 2010 census.

== History ==
A. F. Friday George erected a lumber mill here in 1892. Difficulty hauling lumber over hills by oxen caused the business to fail. The McCloud River Railroad Company was founded in 1895, enabling the transport of lumber from the region. A lumber mill was built by the McCloud River Lumber Company, and electricity and steam heat for homes in McCloud was supplied by the mill. The mill was sold in 1963 to U.S. Plywood, and in 1965, company homes in McCloud were transferred to private owners. The McCloud Community Services District was formed to oversee utilities, library services, and police and fire protection. The lumber mill closed in 1979, re-opened in 1980, and closed in 2002.

== Geography ==
McCloud is located on the southern slope of Mount Shasta.

According to the United States Census Bureau, the CDP has a total area of 2.5 square miles (6.5 km^{2}), of which 2.4 square miles (6.2 km^{2}) is land and 0.1 square miles (0.26 km^{2}) (2.65%) is water.

=== Climate ===
This region experiences warm (but not hot) and dry summers, with no average monthly temperatures above 71.6 °F (22.0 °C). According to the Köppen Climate Classification system, McCloud has a warm-summer Mediterranean climate, abbreviated "Csb" on climate maps.

Climate data for McCloud (1909-2012)
Month	Jan	Feb	Mar	Apr	May	Jun	Jul	Aug	Sep	Oct	Nov	Dec	Year
Record high °F (°C)	71 (22)	79 (26)	84 (29)	90 (32)	100 (38)	105 (41)	108 (42)	107 (42)	106 (41)	96 (36)	83 (28)	73 (23)	108 (42)
Mean maximum °F (°C)	62 (17)	65 (18)	71 (22)	79 (26)	88 (31)	94 (34)	100 (38)	99 (37)	96 (36)	88 (31)	71 (22)	61 (16)	101 (38)
Mean daily maximum °F (°C)	45.9 (7.7)	49.1 (9.5)	54.4 (12.4)	61.4 (16.3)	71.5 (21.9)	80.6 (27.0)	89.4 (31.9)	89.0 (31.7)	83.2 (28.4)	69.6 (20.9)	55.3 (12.9)	46.6 (8.1)	66.3 (19.1)
Daily mean °F (°C)	34.5 (1.4)	37.0 (2.8)	41.1 (5.1)	46.4 (8.0)	55.1 (12.8)	62.3 (16.8)	69.4 (20.8)	67.9 (19.9)	62.1 (16.7)	51.3 (10.7)	41.8 (5.4)	35.2 (1.8)	50.3 (10.2)
Mean daily minimum °F (°C)	24.0 (−4.4)	25.5 (−3.6)	27.7 (−2.4)	31.5 (−0.3)	38.7 (3.7)	44.0 (6.7)	49.5 (9.7)	46.9 (8.3)	41.0 (5.0)	33.1 (0.6)	28.2 (−2.1)	23.8 (−4.6)	34.5 (1.4)
Mean minimum °F (°C)	11 (−12)	14 (−10)	19 (−7)	23 (−5)	28 (−2)	33 (1)	39 (4)	38 (3)	33 (1)	25 (−4)	18 (−8)	13 (−11)	7 (−14)
Record low °F (°C)	−11 (−24)	−12 (−24)	−2 (−19)	8 (−13)	14 (−10)	21 (−6)	28 (−2)	20 (−7)	21 (−6)	11 (−12)	0 (−18)	−14 (−26)	−14 (−26)
Average precipitation inches (mm)	7.98 (203)	7.42 (188)	7.55 (192)	3.77 (96)	2.47 (63)	1.23 (31)	0.19 (4.8)	0.25 (6.4)	0.58 (15)	2.30 (58)	5.59 (142)	10.39 (264)	47.61 (1,209)
Average snowfall inches (cm)	19.9 (51)	13.8 (35)	10.8 (27)	3.1 (7.9)	0.2 (0.51)	0 (0)	0 (0)	0 (0)	0 (0)	0.1 (0.25)	5.7 (14)	22 (56)	75.6 (191.66)
Average precipitation days	12	12	11	9	7	5	1	2	3	6	9	12	89
Source: WRCC

== Demographics ==
=== 2020 ===
The 2020 United States census reported that McCloud had a population of 945. The population density was 390.2 inhabitants per square mile (150.7/km^{2}). The racial makeup of McCloud was 789 (83.5%) White, 3 (0.3%) African American, 4 (0.4%) Native American, 6 (0.6%) Asian, 3 (0.3%) Pacific Islander, 14 (1.5%) from other races, and 126 (13.3%) from two or more races. Hispanic or Latino of any race were 75 persons (7.9%).

The whole population lived in households. There were 477 households, out of which 56 (11.7%) had children under the age of 18 living in them, 203 (42.6%) were married-couple households, 24 (5.0%) were cohabiting couple households, 139 (29.1%) had a female householder with no partner present, and 111 (23.3%) had a male householder with no partner present. 187 households (39.2%) were one person, and 113 (23.7%) were one person aged 65 or older. The average household size was 1.98. There were 255 families (53.5% of all households).

The age distribution was 116 people (12.3%) under the age of 18, 46 people (4.9%) aged 18 to 24, 126 people (13.3%) aged 25 to 44, 297 people (31.4%) aged 45 to 64, and 360 people (38.1%) who were 65 years of age or older. The median age was 60.1 years. For every 100 females, there were 89.8 males.

There were 678 housing units at an average density of 279.9 units per square mile (108.1 units/km^{2}), of which 477 (70.4%) were occupied. Of these, 329 (69.0%) were owner-occupied, and 148 (31.0%) were occupied by renters.

=== 2010 ===
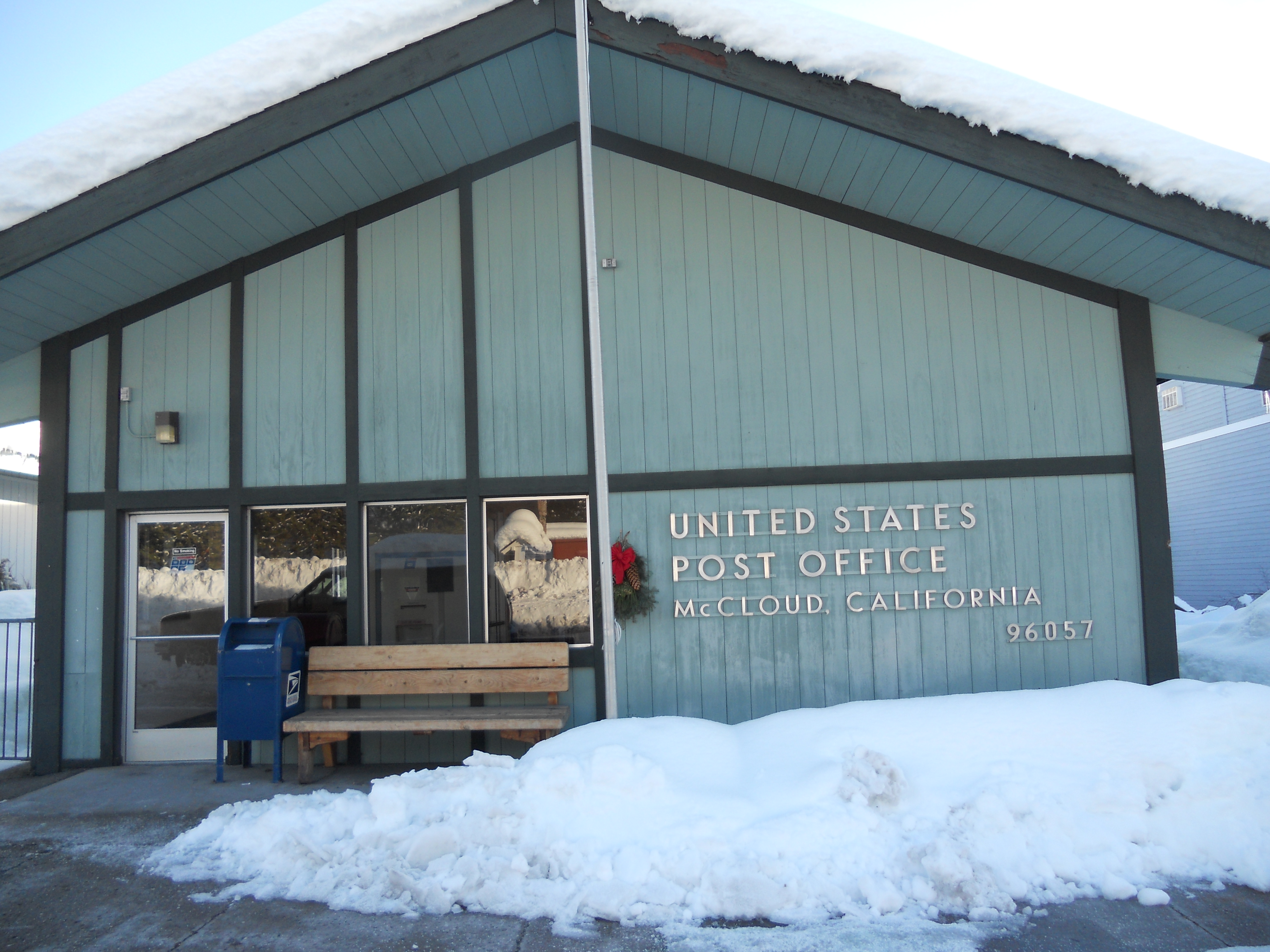
Post office in McCloud

At the 2010 census McCloud had a population of 1,101. The population density was 442.5 inhabitants per square mile (170.9/km^{2}). The racial makeup of McCloud was 1,039 (94.4%) White, 8 (0.7%) African American, 10 (0.9%) Native American, 6 (0.5%) Asian, 0 (0.0%) Pacific Islander, 5 (0.5%) from other races, and 33 (3.0%) from two or more races. Hispanic or Latino of any race were 65 people (5.9%).

The census reported that 1,099 people (99.8% of the population) lived in households, 2 (0.2%) lived in non-institutionalized group quarters, and no one was institutionalized.

There were 528 households, 109 (20.6%) had children under the age of 18 living in them, 240 (45.5%) were opposite-sex married couples living together, 48 (9.1%) had a female householder with no husband present, 22 (4.2%) had a male householder with no wife present. There were 29 (5.5%) unmarried opposite-sex partnerships, and 3 (0.6%) same-sex married couples or partnerships. 190 households (36.0%) were one person and 96 (18.2%) had someone living alone who was 65 or older. The average household size was 2.08. There were 310 families (58.7% of households); the average family size was 2.66.

The age distribution was 188 people (17.1%) under the age of 18, 67 people (6.1%) aged 18 to 24, 186 people (16.9%) aged 25 to 44, 369 people (33.5%) aged 45 to 64, and 291 people (26.4%) who were 65 or older. The median age was 51.8 years. For every 100 females, there were 94.2 males. For every 100 females age 18 and over, there were 93.0 males.

There were 732 housing units at an average density of 294.2 per square mile, of the occupied units 330 (62.5%) were owner-occupied and 198 (37.5%) were rented. The homeowner vacancy rate was 2.9%; the rental vacancy rate was 11.2%. 676 people (61.4% of the population) lived in owner-occupied housing units and 423 people (38.4%) lived in rental housing units.

=== 2000 ===
At the 2000 census, the median household income was $29,500 and the median family income was $35,882. Males had a median income of $34,792 versus $19,545 for females. The per capita income for the CDP was $15,974. About 14.5% of families and 18.1% of the population were below the poverty line, including 30.3% of those under age 18 and 5.9% of those age 65 or over.

== Economy ==
In 2006, Nestlé began negotiations with McCloud to build a bottled water plant, using water from the springs of Mt. Shasta. The contract process was protested by local special interest groups whose said Nestlé neglected to study the impact on the region's ground water and overstated the plant's potential economic benefits. In 2009, Nestlé instead opened a bottling plant in Sacramento.

== Arts and culture ==
A portion of downtown McCloud is listed on the National Register of Historic Places.

== Government ==
In the state legislature McCloud is in the 1st senatorial district, represented by Republican Megan Dahle, and the 1st Assembly district, represented by Republican Heather Hadwick.

Federally, McCloud is in California's 1st congressional district, represented by Republican James Gallagher.

== Notable people ==
- Pat Clements—baseball player
- Rolin Eslinger—professional world champion lumberjack

== See also ==
- List of census-designated places in California
- Ross McCloud, origin of place name
