= Paso Robles Carnegie Library =

- U.S. National Register of Historic Places
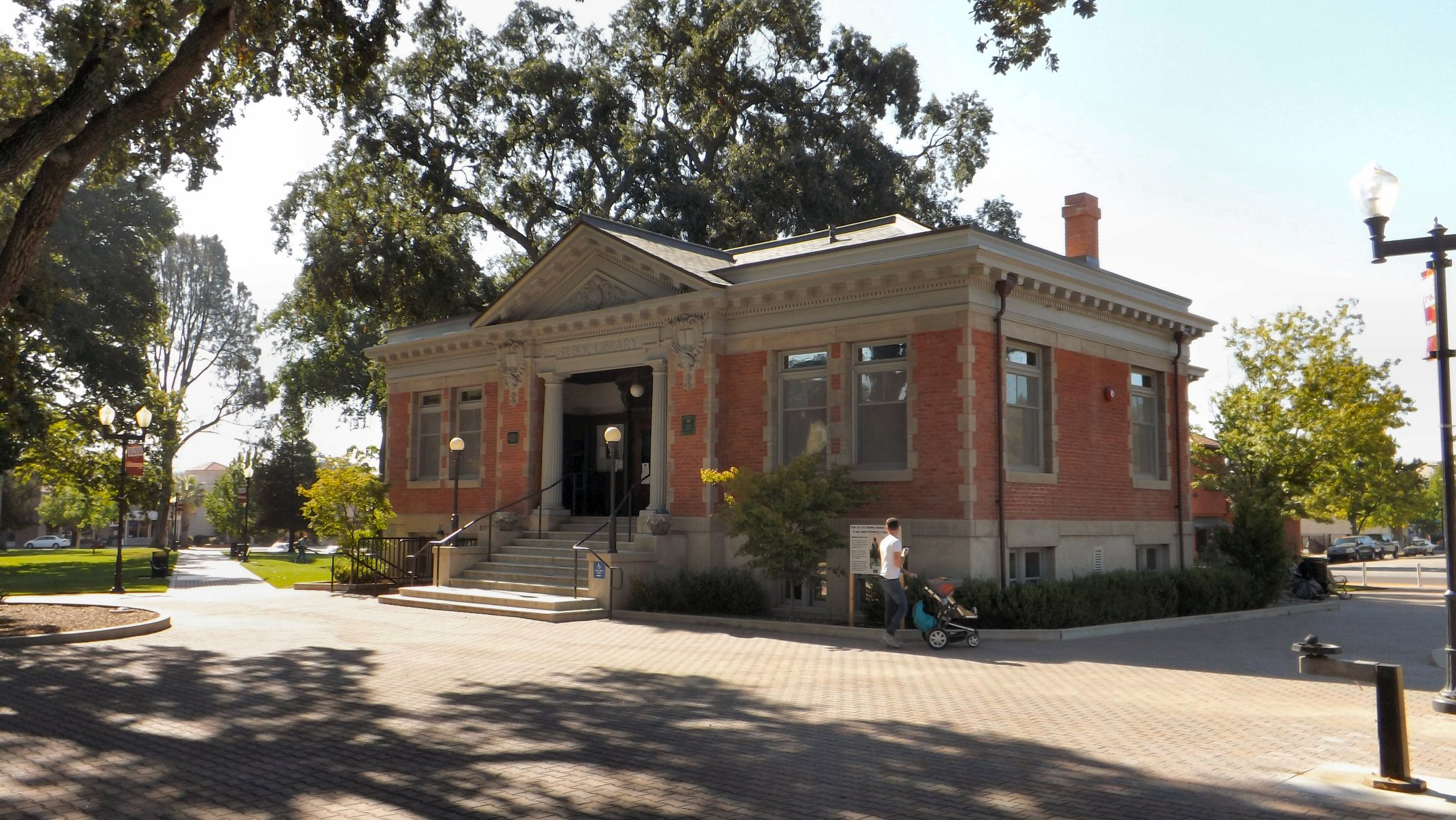

- Location within California Location within the United States
- Location: City Park, 800 12th St., Paso Robles, California
- Coordinates: 35°37′33″N 120°41′20″W
- Area: less than one acre
- Built: 1907–08
- Built by: Summers, R.O.
- Architect: Weeks, William H.
- Architectural style: Classical Revival
- MPS: California Carnegie Libraries MPS
- NRHP reference No.: 97001635
- Added to NRHP: January 26, 1998

The Paso Robles Carnegie Library is a Carnegie library located in Paso Robles City Park in Paso Robles, California. The library was built from 1907 to 1908 through a $10,000 grant from the Carnegie Foundation. Architect William H. Weeks, who designed several other buildings in the city, designed the library in the Classical Revival style. The projecting front entrance of the building has an ornamented pediment supported by two columns and two wide brick pilasters. The building has a decorative cornice, and an ornamental frieze is located beneath the pediment and cornice at the entrance. The Works Progress Administration expanded the back of the library in 1939. The library operated until 1995, when it was replaced by a new building and purchased by the city's historical society.

The library was added to the National Register of Historic Places on January 26, 1998.
