= Bank of Tracy =

- U.S. National Register of Historic Places
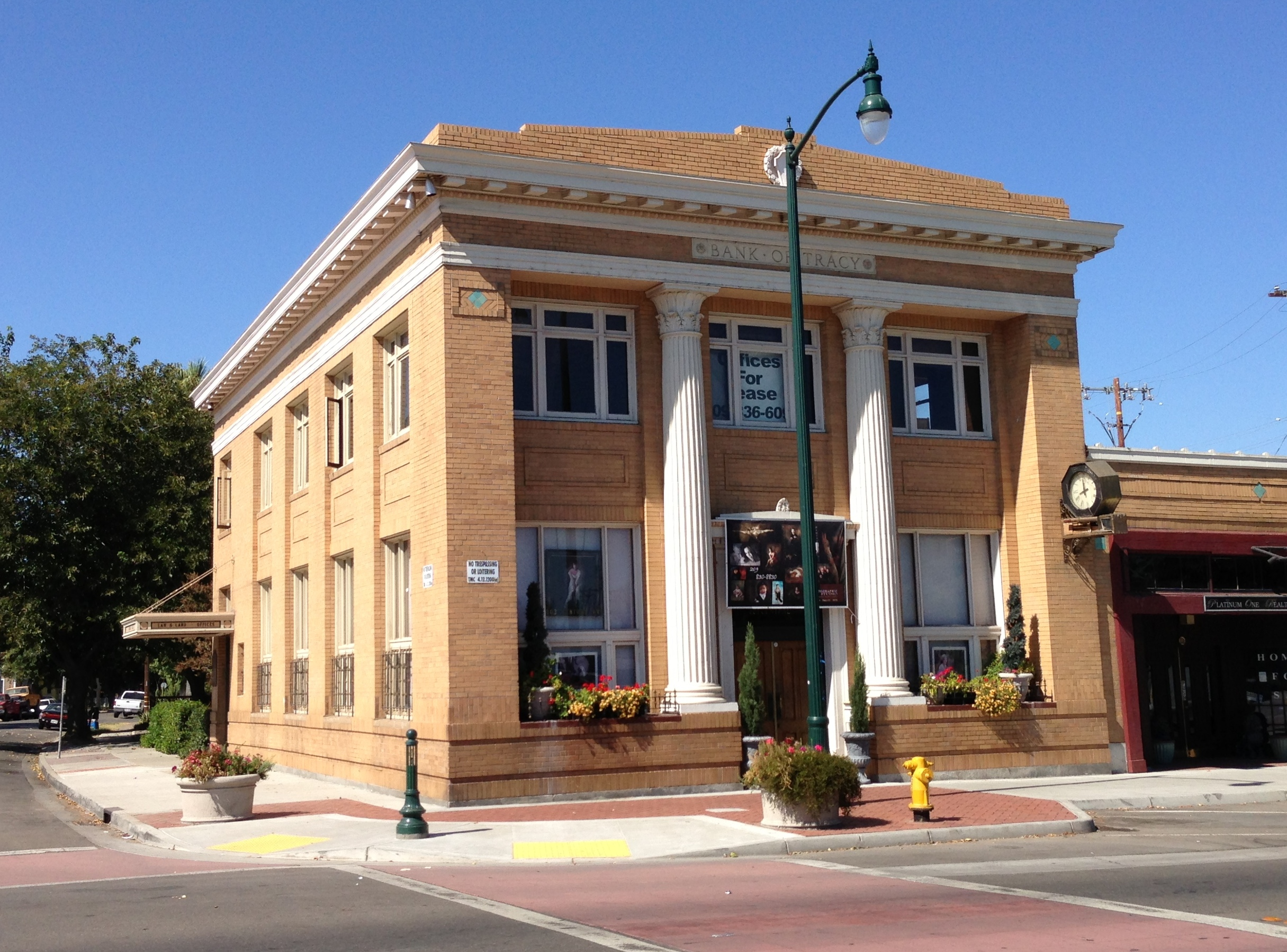
- Bank of Tracy

- Location within Northern California
- Location: 801 Central Ave., Tracy, California
- Coordinates: 37°44′13″N 121°25′29″W
- Area: 0.2 acres (0.081 ha)
- Built: 1920
- Built by: Lester Edner
- Architect: William H. Weeks
- Architectural style: Classical Revival
- NRHP reference No.: 80000851
- Added to NRHP: June 3, 1980

The Bank of Tracy is a historic commercial building in Tracy, California, completed in 1920. It was added to the National Register of Historic Places in 1980.

== History ==
The Bank of Tracy opened in 1909, the first bank established in the town. The bank moved into its new building in 1920. The site chosen for the new building had been a livery stable owned by George Cox.

The building was designed by noted architect W. H. Weeks. The two-story bank building and adjoining one-story commercial unit measure 65 by 125 feet (20 m × 38 m). The commercial wing is divided into 4 stores.

The Bank of Tracy was purchased by The American Bank of Oakland in February 1923. The American Bank later became the American Trust Company, and in 1947 moved to a different building. The bank portion of the building was vacant for years, although some offices on the second floor and adjacent commercial units were occupied.

The building was renovated in 1978 and renamed Central Plaza. During the renovation, the original light fixtures, back stair, bathroom fixtures, and second floor wood trim and hardware were found to be salvageable.
