= Yolo Branch Library =

- U.S. National Register of Historic Places
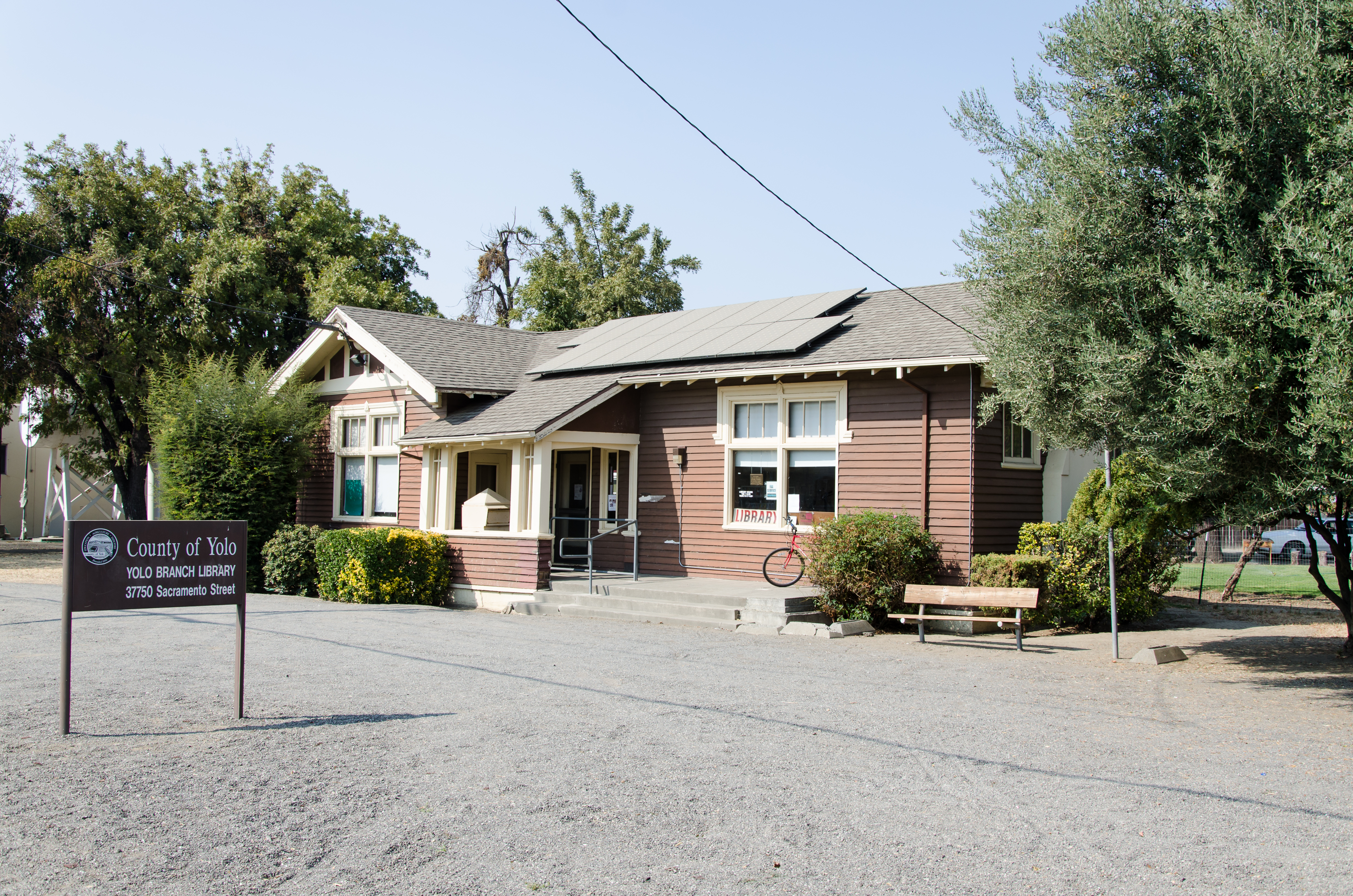

- Location within California Location within the United States
- Location: 200 Sacramento St., Yolo, California
- Coordinates: 38°44′0″N 121°48′22″W
- Built: 1918
- Architect: WH Weeks
- Architectural style: Bungalow/Craftsman
- MPS: California Carnegie Libraries MPS
- NRHP reference No.: 90001810
- Added to NRHP: December 10, 1990

The Yolo Branch Library is a library that serves the community of Yolo, California. The library, a Carnegie on the National Register of Historic Places, was designed by WH Weeks and built in 1918. It is one of the last Carnegie libraries that still serves as a library.

== History ==
In 1910 Yolo County set up its county library system, and the community of Yolo was one of the first areas with a library branch. Funding from Andrew Carnegie was sought for after his recent funding for Woodland Public Library in neighboring Woodland, California.

One of Carnegie's employees, James Beltram, felt that the county had received their allotment of Carnegie money, but the county librarian still sought the funding. The Yolo County librarian corresponded with James Beltram for roughly 20 letters when $3,000 was finally offered to construct a new branch in 1917.

Once Beltram realized the county's intent of putting the branch in Yolo, he objected to the funding again, this time on the basis that the community was too close to the formerly funded library. Yolo was defended with the fact that its current facilities were out of date and that it served a large rural base.

The local residents collected $300 to buy the lot of the future library branch. William Henry Weeks, designer of the Woodland Public Library, was chosen as the architect. The library branch officially opened in 1918, and is still open today. The designs for this branch would later be duplicated for the Santa Cruz Eastside branch library in Santa Cruz, California.
