= Hotel Macdoel =

- U.S. National Register of Historic Places
- Location within California
- Location: Montezuma Ave. and Mt. Shasta St., Macdoel, California
- Coordinates: 41°49′43″N 122°00′10″W
- Area: less than one acre
- Built: 1909
- Built by: Hufford, D.D.
- Architectural style: Colonial Revival, Victorian
- NRHP reference No.: 82002275
- Added to NRHP: February 11, 1982

Hotel Macdoel, at Montezuma Ave. and Mt. Shasta St. in Macdoel, California, was built in 1909. It was listed on the National Register of Historic Places in 1982.

It is a significant legacy of the Church of the Brethren (a Schwarzenau Brethren / Dunkers -related church)'s attempt to colonize the valley, in remote northern California about 20 miles (32 km) from the Oregon border.

The building is a two-and-a-half-story 108 by 48 feet (33 m × 15 m) building at Mt. Shasta Street and Montezuma Avenue. It was built upon lava rock, and is a concrete-reinforced building with a partial basement. Architecturally, it is not clearly of any one style, but appears to show aspects of styles of its time, i.e. "of Colonial Revival in its careful symmetry and horizontality, but retaining Victorian design characteristics in its use of contrasting exterior siding and millwork at the bracketed eaves, balustrade, and entrance porch." It has contrasting exterior surfaces, of horizontal shiplap siding on its first story and of cedar shingles on its second and attic stories. These surfaces are "separated by a belt course, extending around the structure and approximating an entablature with simplified architrave, frieze and cornice."
