= Forest House =

- U.S. National Register of Historic Places
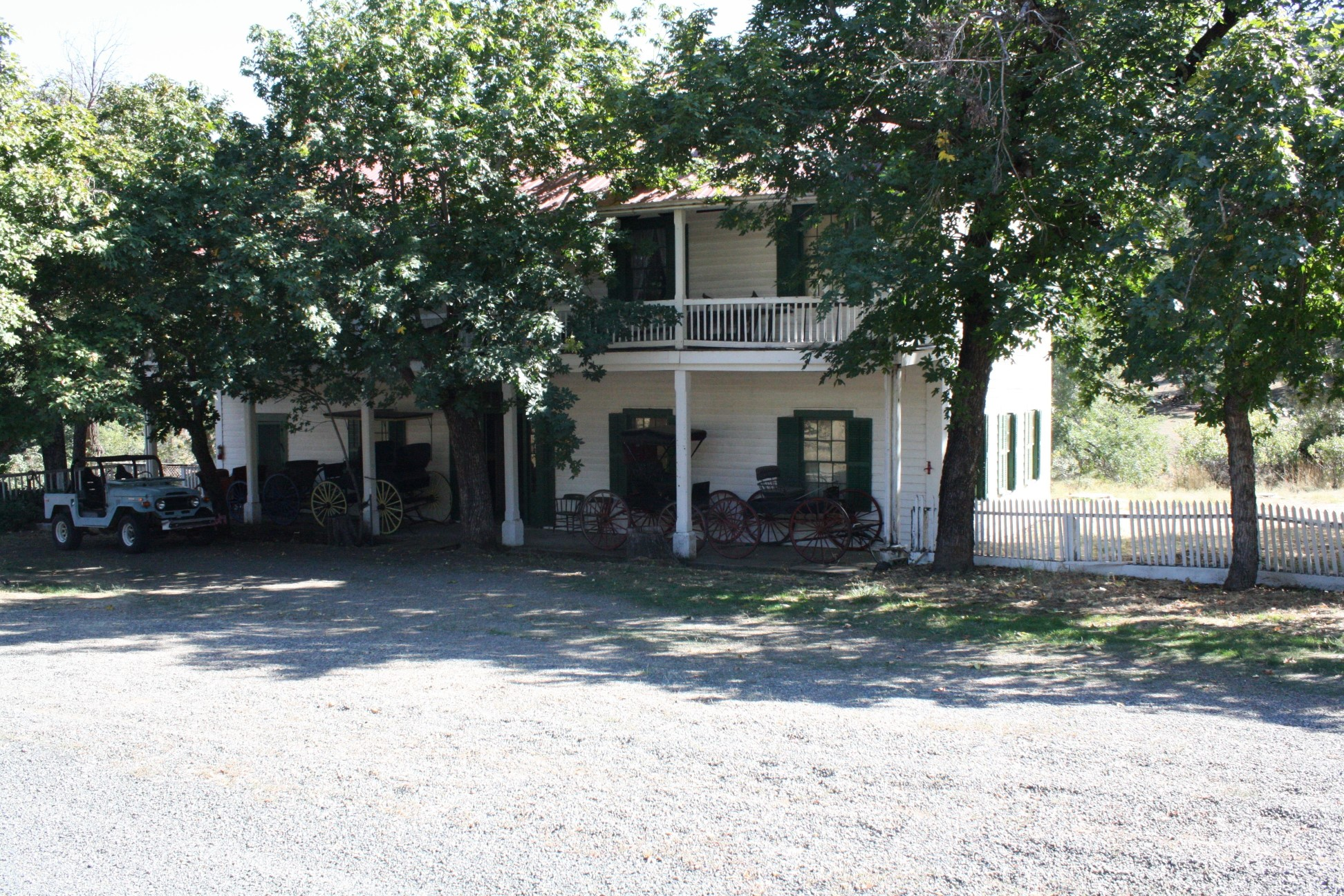

- Location within California Location within the United States
- Nearest city: Yreka, California
- Coordinates: 41.673457°N 122.685696°W
- Area: 5.8 acres (2.3 ha)
- Built: 1852
- Built by: Horace Knight, Marshal Short
- Architectural style: Greek Revival
- NRHP reference No.: 11000433
- Added to NRHP: July 14, 2011

The Forest House, near Yreka, California, was built in 1852. It was listed on the National Register of Historic Places in 2011. The listing included six contributing buildings and three non-contributing ones.

It is a building complex that was the center of the Forest House Ranch, "centered upon the Forest House itself, a two-story, wood-frame, building built circa 1852 on the Yreka-Fort Jones Road." It includes 19th century barns and outbuildings.

It is located at 4204 California State Route 3, on its south side, about 5 miles (8.0 km) southeast of Yreka. It was built upon what was originally a private toll road and served as a hotel and a meeting hall.
