= W. H. Weeks =

American architect

William Henry Weeks
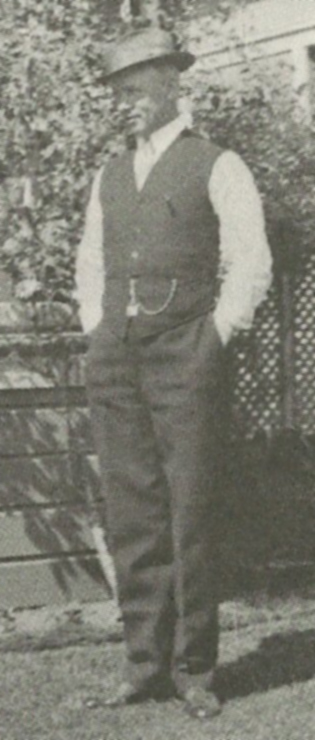
- Weeks in front of his home in Watsonville, California
- Born: 18 January 1864; Charlottetown, Prince Edward Island, British North America
- Died: 29 April 1936 (aged 72); Piedmont, California, U.S.
- Education: Brinker Collegiate Institute
- Occupation: Architect
- Buildings: Carnegie libraries and schools across Northern and Central California

William Henry Weeks (1864–1936) was an American architect, he was active in the early 20th-century who designed hundreds of buildings including many schools, banks, and libraries. He was best known for the monumental neoclassical style of his public buildings, although he had employed other architectural styles earlier in his career. His first office was in Watsonville, California, but later offices were in various parts of the San Francisco Bay area. Weeks' firm designed structures in over 161 California cities, as well as several buildings in Nevada and Oregon. Weeks was a pioneer in earthquake-resistant construction and, as a result, many of his buildings are still in use.

== Early life ==
William Henry Weeks was born in Charlottetown, Prince Edward Island, Canada on January 18, 1864, the fourth child of Richard and Margaret Weeks. In 1885, Weeks graduated from the Brinker Collegiate Institute, a co-educational day and boarding school that was open for a short time in Denver, Colorado. After the family moved to their new home in Wichita, Kansas, Weeks began his career working with his father as a builder and designer.

== Family and business life ==
Weeks became engaged to one of the Haymaker girls who lived in Charlestown, Indiana, but she died before the wedding took place. Meanwhile, Weeks' family had moved to Tacoma, Washington, but he returned to Indiana and asked his late fiancée's sister Maggie for her hand in marriage. She accepted and they were married in 1891, at the bride's home in Charlestown. He and his wife would later have nine children, of whom only five survived to adulthood. They moved to Tacoma for a period, but eventually moved to Oakland, California along with Weeks' family.

In 1894, Weeks opened an office in Watsonville, and was employed as the designer for several projects in town. His business prospered, and in 1897 he opened a branch office in Salinas, where he then spent part of his work-week. As Weeks' business continued to grow, he began to bid to design buildings in Monterey, Pacific Grove, Santa Cruz, and many other parts of Northern California. In the middle of the 1890s Weeks had moved his family to Watsonville, and when he was in town he was active in his church, teaching Sunday School class when he could. Weeks was also involved in his community at large: he helped draw up the new city charter for Watsonville and volunteered for many years on the YMCA Board of Directors.

By 1899, Weeks began to invest in real estate in Watsonville, and during his lifetime he accumulated a sizable amount of local property.

In 1905, Weeks opened another branch office in San Francisco, at 251 Kearney Street, and he was in the city, staying at a hotel, when the 1906 earthquake hit. Fortunately he was unharmed. He was already busy designing numerous buildings along the California coast and Northern California during 1905, and the earthquake in the Bay Area increased his work load, as he designed and built replacements for many buildings damaged by the quake and the fires in the aftermath.

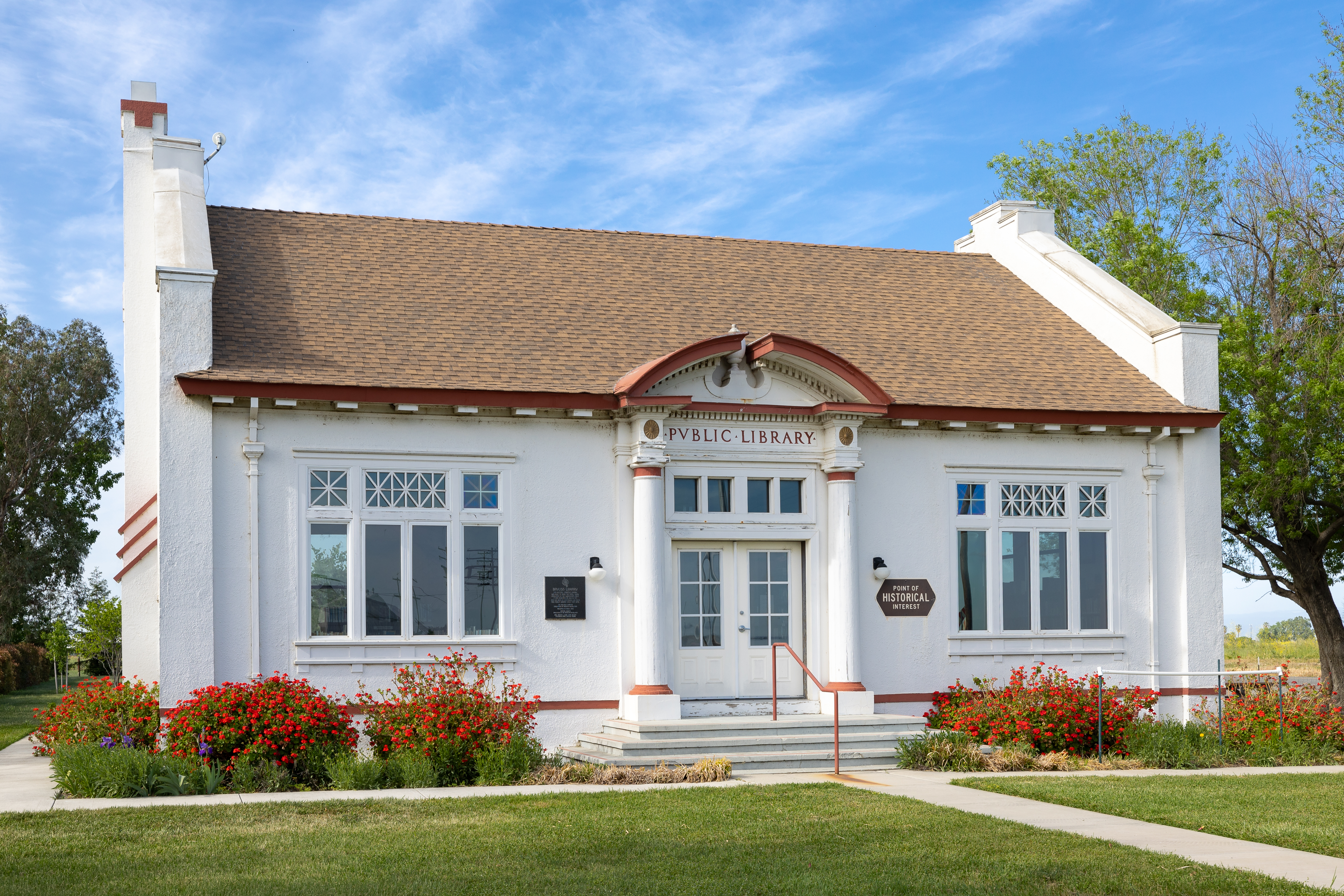
Bayliss Carnegie Library in Glenn County, California, designed by Weeks and dedicated in July 1917

Weeks' reputation grew because he built many of the Carnegie Libraries in Northern and Central California. However, he actually designed more school buildings than libraries. Local newspapers praised him for his safe and practical school designs. Many of those school buildings remain in use today, including the main buildings of Santa Cruz High School, Los Gatos High School, and Santa Barbara High School.

After 18 years in Watsonville, Weeks decided to move to Palo Alto in 1911, to be closer to his business in San Francisco and the Bay Area in general. He moved yet again in 1922 when he decided his family needed a larger and more spacious home. He designed and built a Spanish Colonial Revival-style house in Piedmont, California at a cost of $20,000.

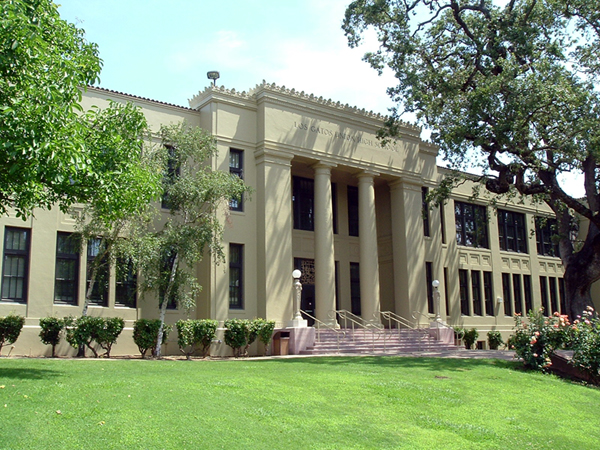
Los Gatos High School, designed by Weeks, was dedicated on January 17, 1925.

In 1924, Weeks took his son Harold as his business partner and renamed the business "Weeks and Weeks." The same year a new branch office was opened in Oakland, followed by another in San Jose in 1926. In 1928, Weeks' was one of the largest and oldest architectural firms in California. His staff included many architects, engineers, and other specialists. As the business grew, with the direction of Weeks and the company directors, the Weeks Securities Corporation was formed, with the goal of managing the organizing and financing of commercial building properties.

Between 1930 and 1932, Weeks had to deal with many setbacks in his business dealings. In 1930 it was rumored that the Weeks Securities Corporation was $300,000 in debt, but the allegation was found to be incorrect. In 1931, after an investigation, the corporation's license to sell stock was suspended on the grounds that stockholders' money was being "misappropriated." Two employees, one of whom was married to Weeks' niece, left after things became "hot and heavy." In the fall of 1931, the state revoked Weeks' license as an architect after a contractor accused him of inflating four building contracts in the East Bay. The charges were later dismissed and his license reinstated, but Weeks was reprimanded for "gross negligence in performance of contractual duties."

In 1932, Weeks was 68 years old and still very much active. He was bothered by recurring heart problems (chronic inflammation of the heart), but still maintained his active lifestyle. In 1935, Weeks had a heart attack, which temporarily slowed him down, but he resumed his active pace for several more months until he died in his home in Piedmont on April 29, 1936. In his will Weeks left his architectural business solely to his son Harold, and left nothing to his other children, stating that his wife "will provide for them as she may be able." He left her the entire remainder of his estate.

== See also ==
- List of buildings designed by W. H. Weeks
