= Estimated time of arrival =

Time when something is expected to arrive at a certain place

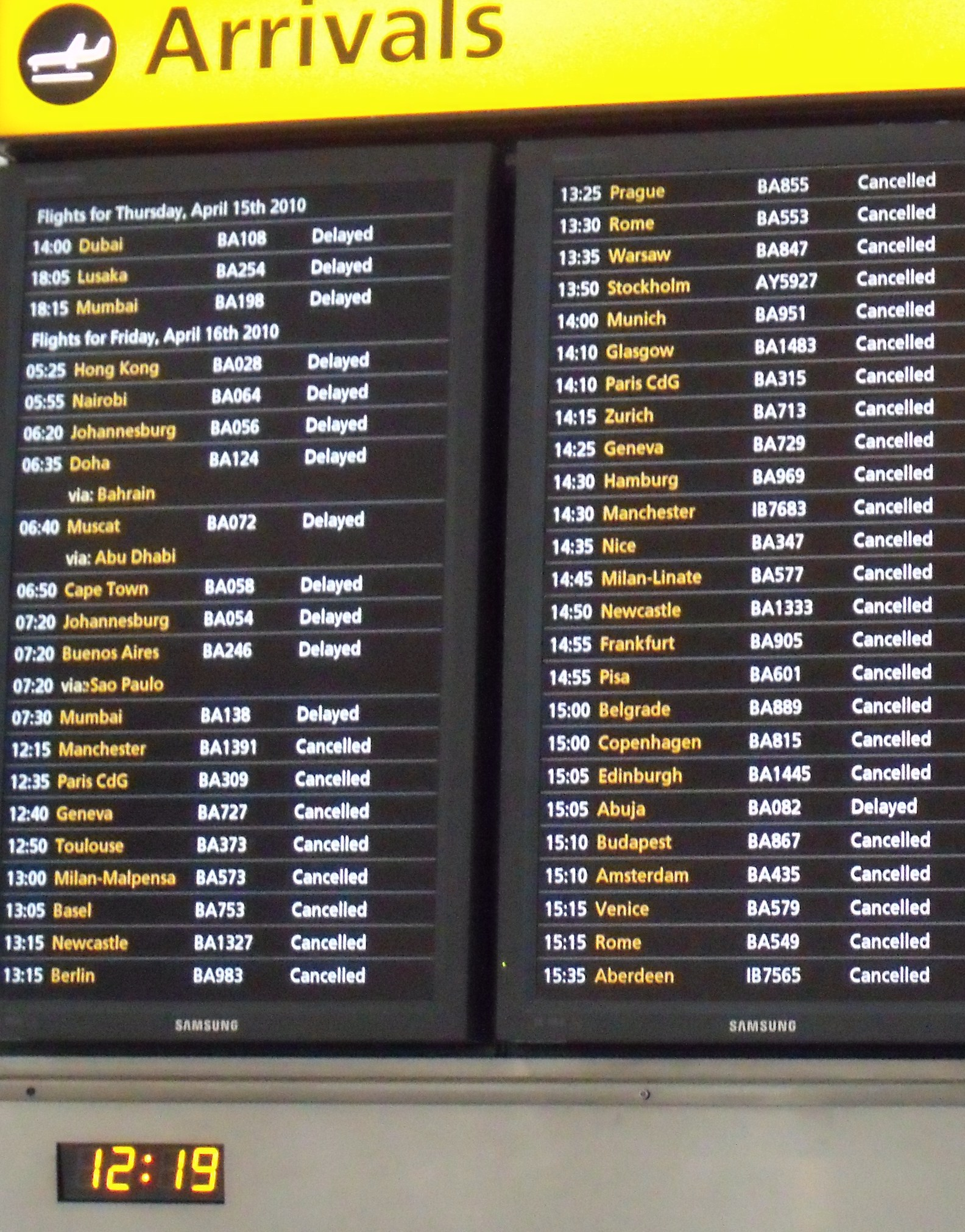
Arrivals board at the Heathrow airport

Estimated time of arrival (ETA) is the time when a ship, vehicle, aircraft, cargo, person, or emergency service is expected to arrive at a certain place.

== Overview ==
One of the more common uses of the phrase is in public transportation where the movements of trains, buses, airplanes and the like can be used to generate estimated times of arrival depending on either a static timetable or through measurements on traffic intensity. In this respect, the phrase or its abbreviation is often paired with its complement, estimated time of departure (ETD), to indicate the expected start time of a particular journey. This information is often conveyed to a passenger information system as part of the core functionality of intelligent transportation systems.

For example, a certain flight may have a calculated ETA based on the speed by which it has covered the distance traveled so far. The remaining distance is divided by the speed previously measured to roughly estimate the arrival time. This particular method does not take into account any unexpected events (such as new wind directions) which may occur on the way to the flight's destination.

ETA is also used metaphorically in situations where nothing actually moves physically, as in describing the time estimated for a certain task to complete (e.g. work undertaken by an individual; a computation undertaken by a computer program; or a process undertaken by an organization). The associated term is "estimated time of accomplishment", which may be a backronym.

== Applications ==
Accurate and timely estimations of times of arrival are important in several application areas:

- In air traffic control arrival sequencing and scheduling, where scheduling aircraft arrival according to the first-come-first-served order of ETA at the runway minimizes delays.
- In airport gate assignment methods, to optimize gate utilization.
- In elevator control, to minimize the average waiting time or journey time of passengers (destination dispatch).

== See also ==
- Timestamp
