= California State Capitol =

California government building

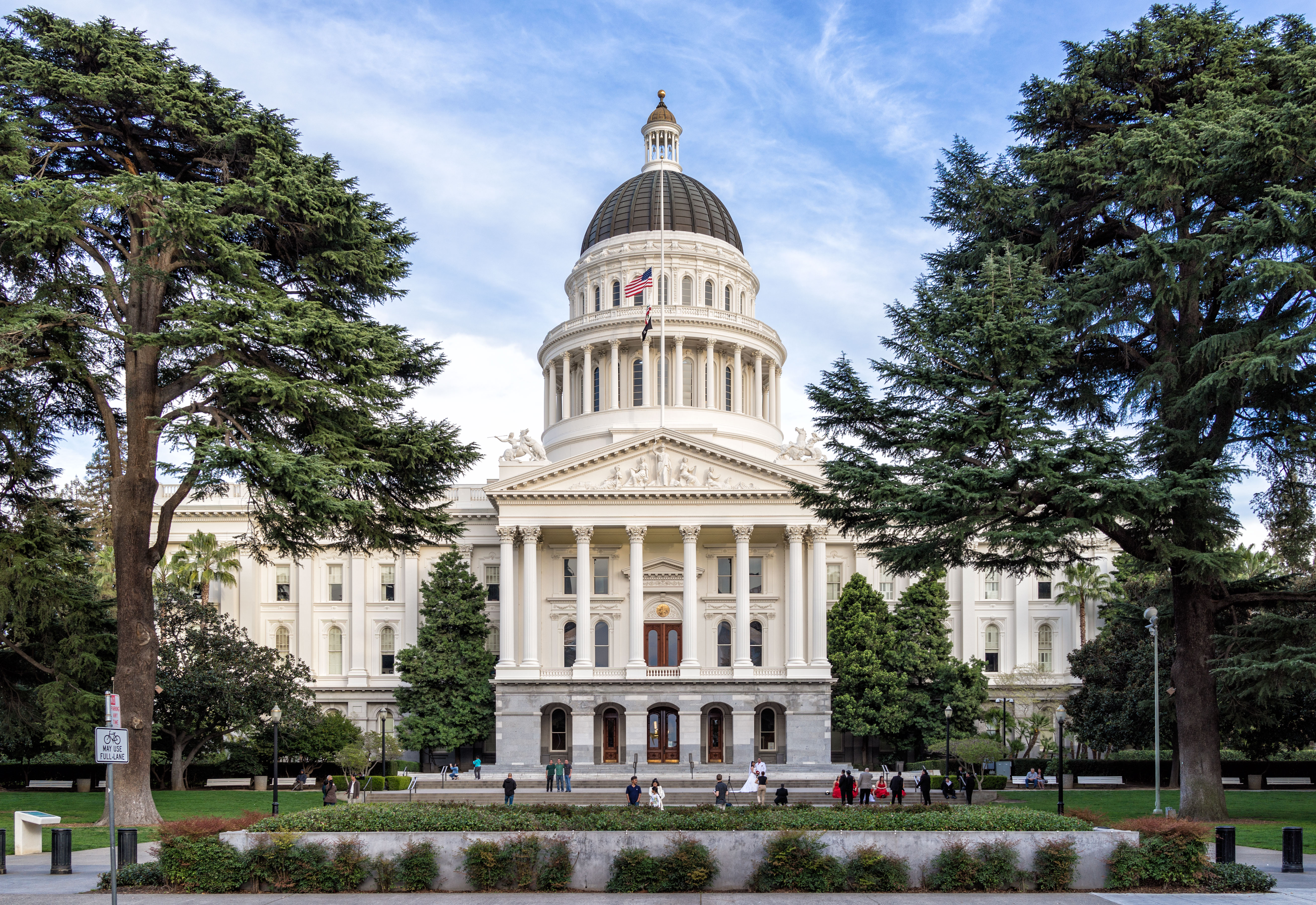

- Location within Sacramento, California Location within California Location within the United States

General information
- Type: Government offices
- Architectural style: Neoclassical Architecture
- Location: 1315 10th and L St, Sacramento, CA
- Coordinates: 38°34′36″N 121°29′37″W
- Construction started: 1860; 166 years ago
- Completed: 1874; 152 years ago
- Owner: State of California
- Operator: State of California

Height
- Antenna spire: 75.3 m (247 ft)
- Roof: 64 m (210 ft)

Technical details
- Floor count: West wing: 3 1/2 (4); East Annex: 6

Design and construction
- Architects: M. Frederic Butler, Reuben Clark, Gordon Parker Cummings
- California State Capitol
- U.S. National Register of Historic Places
- California Historical Landmark
- Architectural style: Neoclassical Renaissance Revival (interior)
- NRHP reference No.: 73000427
- CHISL No.: 872
- Added to NRHP: April 3, 1973

The California State Capitol is the seat of the California state government, located in Sacramento, the state capital of California. The building houses the chambers of the California State Legislature, made up of the assembly and the senate, along with the office of the governor of California. The Neoclassical structure, designed by Reuben S. Clark, was completed between 1861 and 1874. Located at the west end of Capitol Park and the east end of the Capitol Mall, the building was added to the National Register of Historic Places in 1973. The California State Capitol Museum is housed on the grounds of the capitol.

== History ==
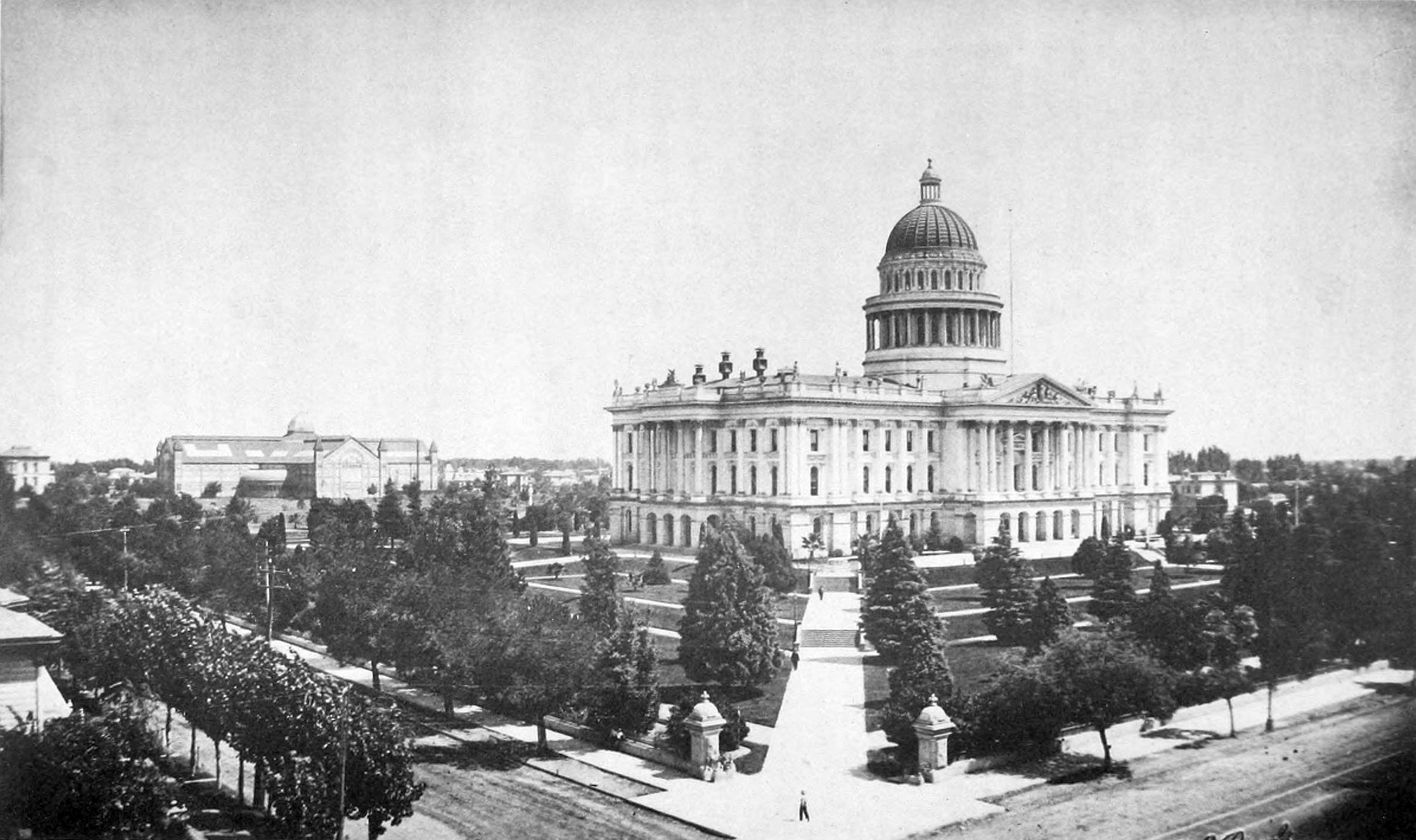
The California Capitol in 1890.

The structure was completed between 1860 and 1874, designed by architect Reuben S. Clark of Clark & Kenitzer, one of San Francisco's oldest architectural firms, founded in 1854. Although not generally considered earthquake country, Sacramento was hit by two earthquakes within days of each other in 1892 which damaged the Capitol. The Capitol was remodeled, adding seventy rooms and elevators, between 1906 and 1908.

Between 1949 and 1952, the Capitol's apse was demolished to make way for the building's expansion with the construction of the Capitol Annex adjoining the historic Capitol building to its east. The offices of the governor of California were housed in the Capitol Annex.

The Capitol and grounds were listed on the office of the National Register of Historic Places in 1973, and listed as a California Historical Landmark in 1974, with a re-dedication on January 9, 1982, to commemorate the close of the bicentennial restoration project. The building underwent a major renovation known as the California State Capitol Restoration, from 1975 until 1982, involving an architectural restoration and structural reconstruction for earthquake safety.

In 2012, many protesting cuts to higher education stormed the building and were arrested.

The Capitol Annex was vacated in 2021 in preparation for its demolition and replacement with a new Annex on the same site, due to its obsolescence and decayed state. Demolition was delayed until 2023 by lawsuits about the project's environmental impacts to the trees in Capitol Park, which is immediately adjacent to the Annex site. The offices and personnel previously in the Annex moved into the newly constructed Capitol Annex Swing Space building until the new Annex is constructed.

== Construction and design ==
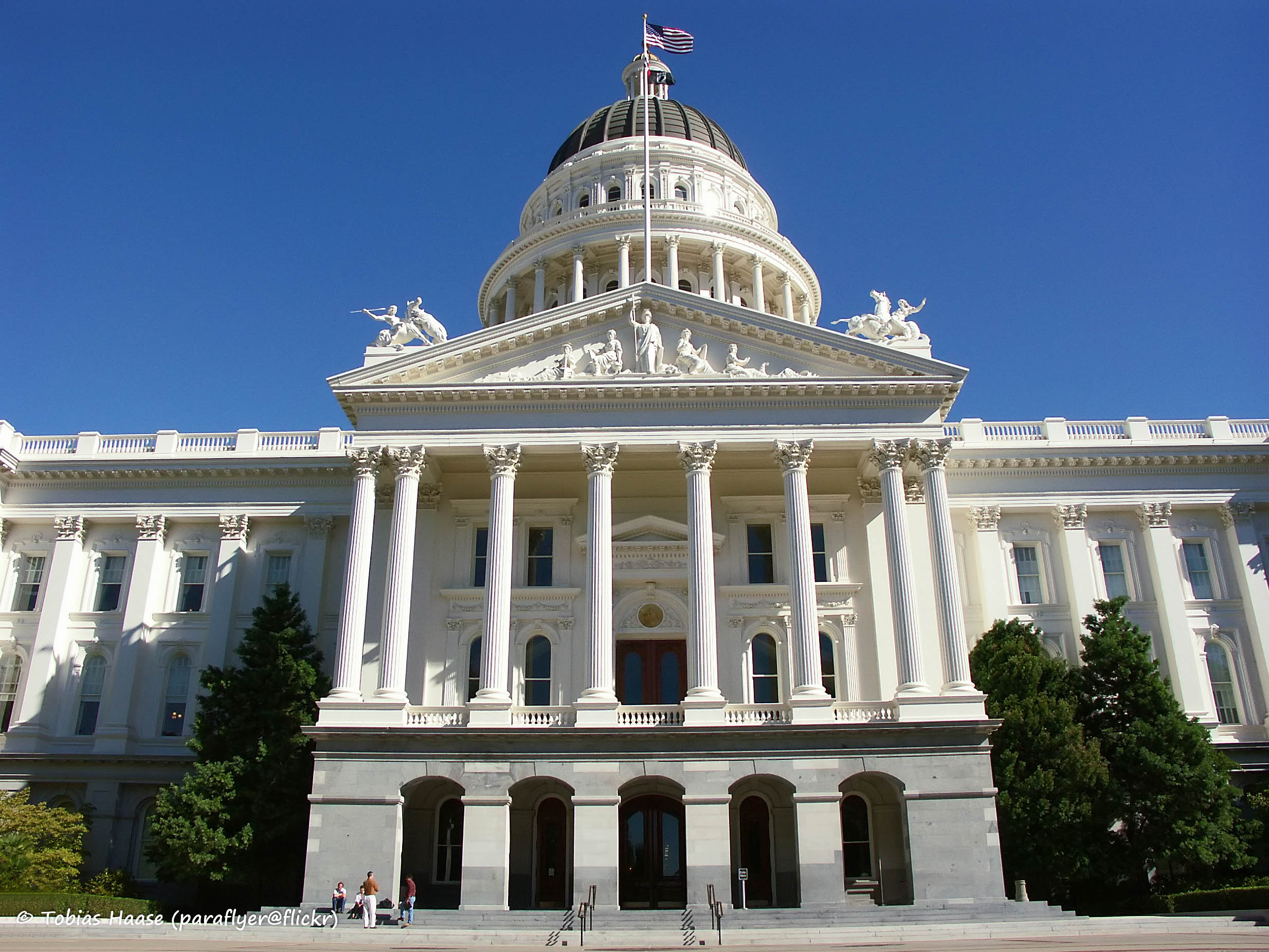
The Capitol was designed in a Neoclassical style by prominent architect Reuben S. Clark in 1860.

=== Exterior ===
The building is based on the U.S. Capitol building in Washington, D.C. The west facade ends in projecting bays, and a portico projects from the center of the building. At the base of the portico, seven granite archways brace and support the porch above. Eight fluted Corinthian columns line the portico. A cornice supports the pediment above depicting the Roman goddess of wisdom, Minerva, surrounded by allegorical figures representing Education, Justice, Industry and Mining.

Above the flat roof with balustrade are two drums supporting a dome. The first drum consists of a colonnade of Corinthian columns; the second, Corinthian pilasters. Large arched windows line the drum walls. The dome is 64 m (210 ft) high, and supports a lantern with a smaller dome capped with a gold-leafed orbed finial.

=== Interior ===
The California Senate chamber seats its forty members in a large chamber room decorated in red, which is a reference to the British House of Lords (also the upper house of a bicameral legislature). The chamber is entered through a second-floor corridor. From the coffered ceiling hangs an electric reproduction of the original gas chandelier. A hand-carved dais caps off a recessed bay framed by Corinthian columns.

The Latin phrase "Senatoris est civitatis libertatem tueri" ("It is the duty of the Senator to guard the civil liberties of the Commonwealth") lines the cornice. A portrait of George Washington by Jane Stuart, the daughter of Gilbert Stuart, is on the wall above. The State Seal hangs above. Statues of Minerva once overlooked both chambers' however, today, Minerva, sculpted by Michael H. Casey, appears only in the Senate chamber.

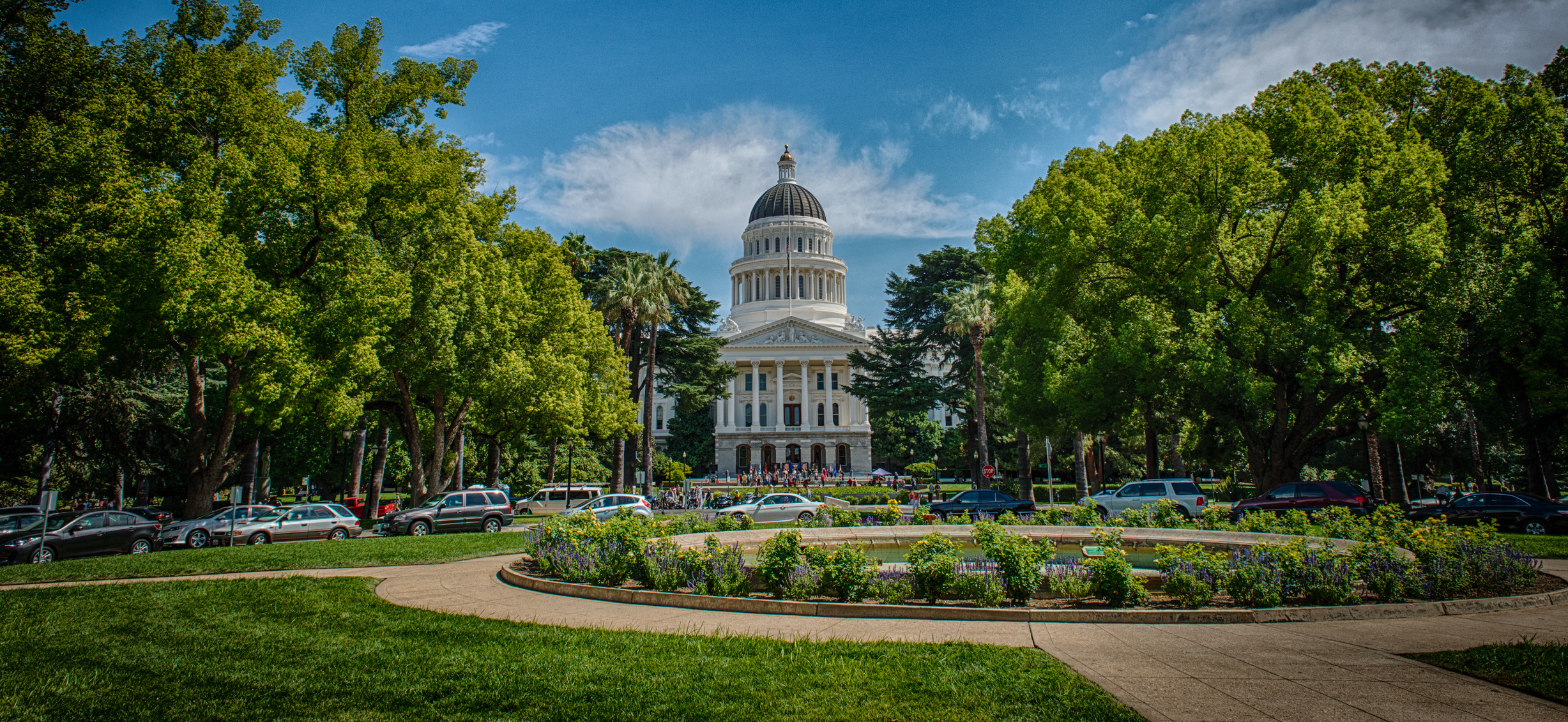
View of the Capitol from the fountain plaza in front.

Gilded Corinthian columns support the gallery above, and dark red curtains that can be drawn for privacy are tied back along the columns. High arched windows run along the bottom below rectangular pane windows. Behind the rostrum, there are two chairs with red velvet cushions, reserved for the president pro tempore of the Senate and the Speaker of the Assembly, but they are never used.

The California Assembly chamber is located at the opposite end of the building. Its green tones are based on those of the British House of Commons, the lower house. The dais rests along a wall shaped like an "E", with the central projection housing the rostrum. Along the cornice is the Assembly motto, in Latin: Legislatorum est justas leges condere ("It is the duty of legislators to establish just laws").

== California Capitol Museum and Park ==
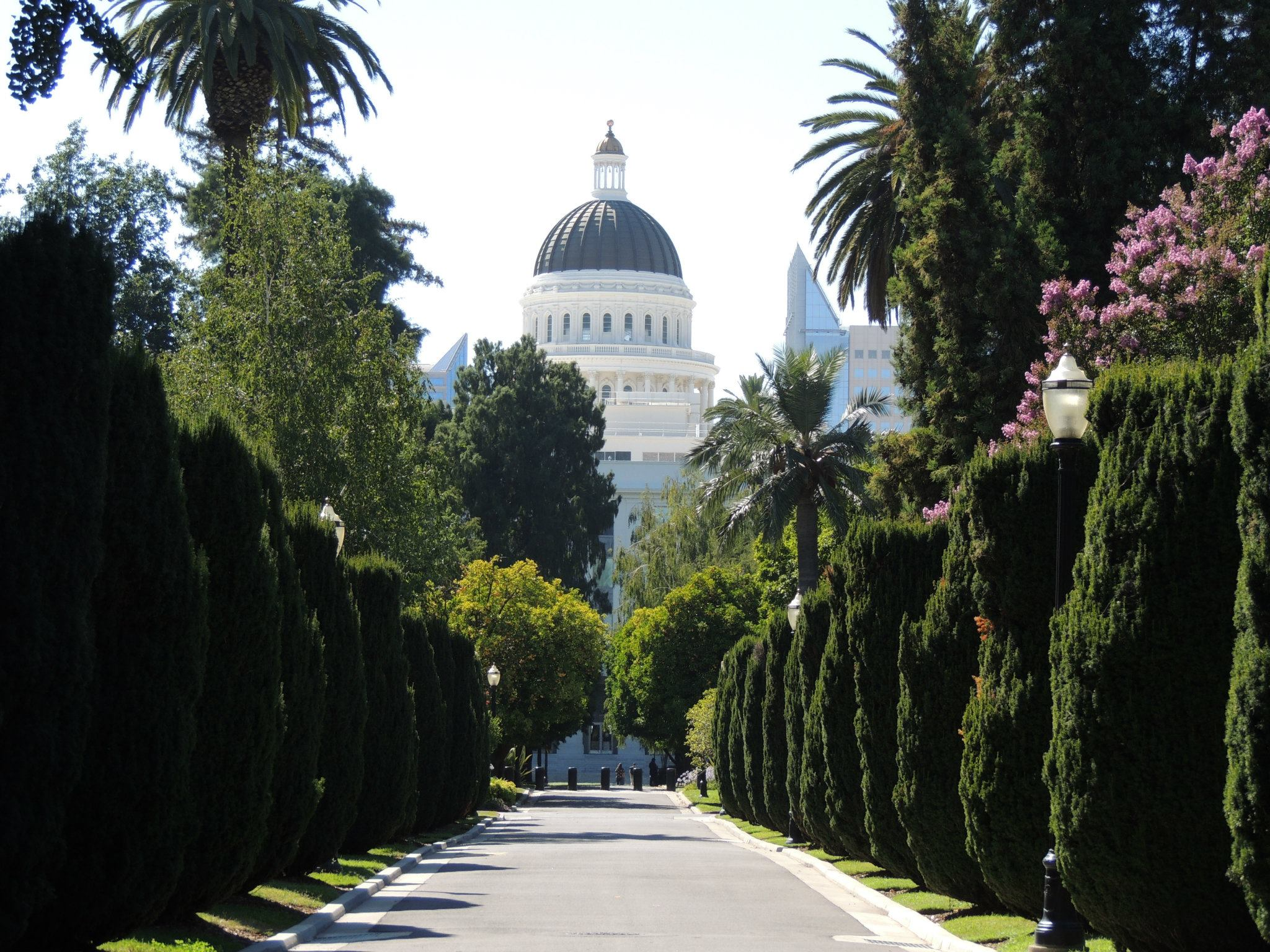
View of the dome from Capitol Park.

The California State Capitol Museum is a museum housed within the capitol and on the grounds of Capitol Park, run by California State Parks. The Capitol Museum includes the historic offices of the governor and legislature.

The capitol's grounds are known as Capitol Park, an area of 10 undivided city blocks running from 10th to 16th and from L to N Streets. The entire Capitol Park area is included in the National Register historic district listing. Capitol Park contains numerous monuments and memorials, including the California Firefighters Memorial and El Soldado Memorial.

== Gallery ==
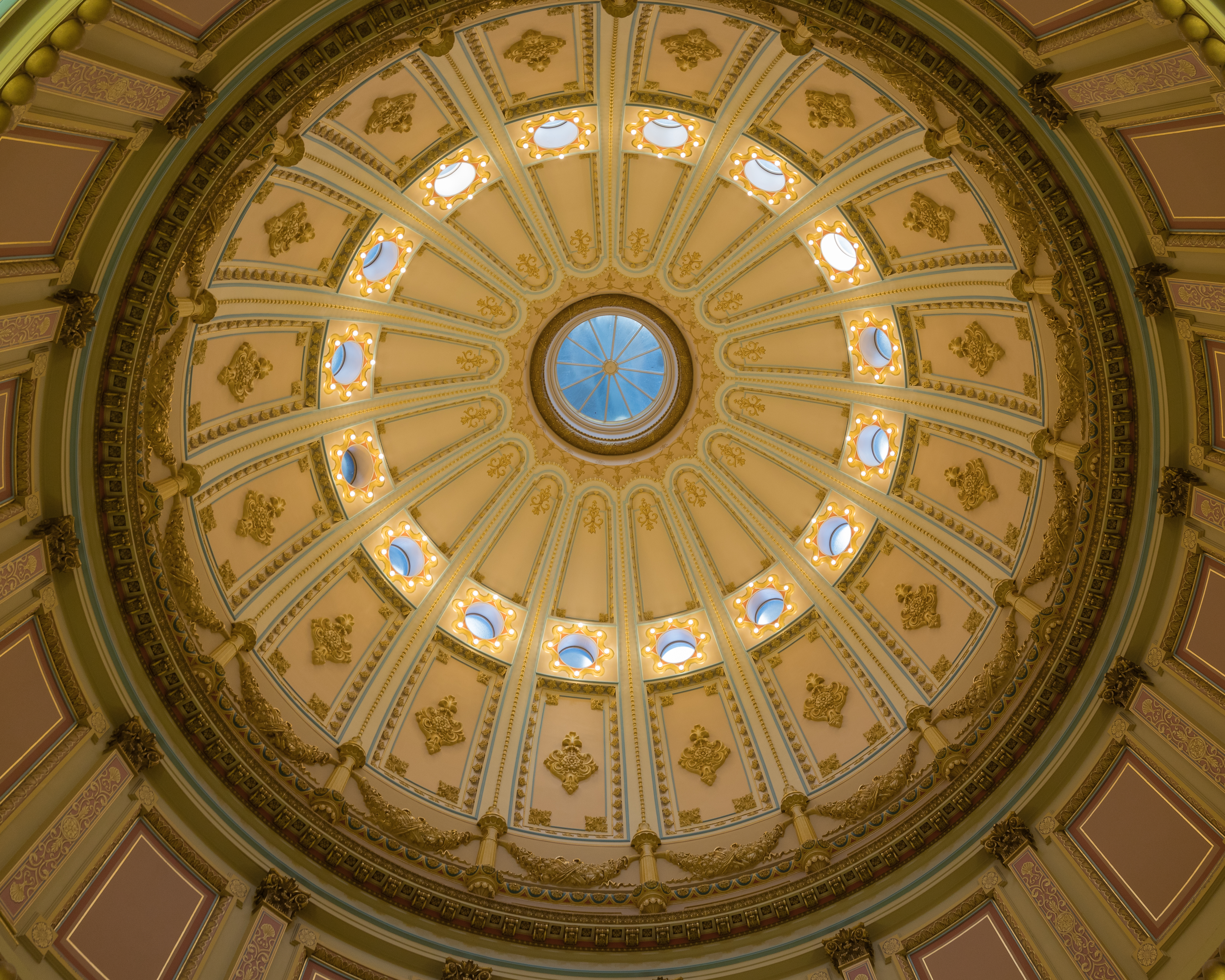
Interior of the Capitol Dome

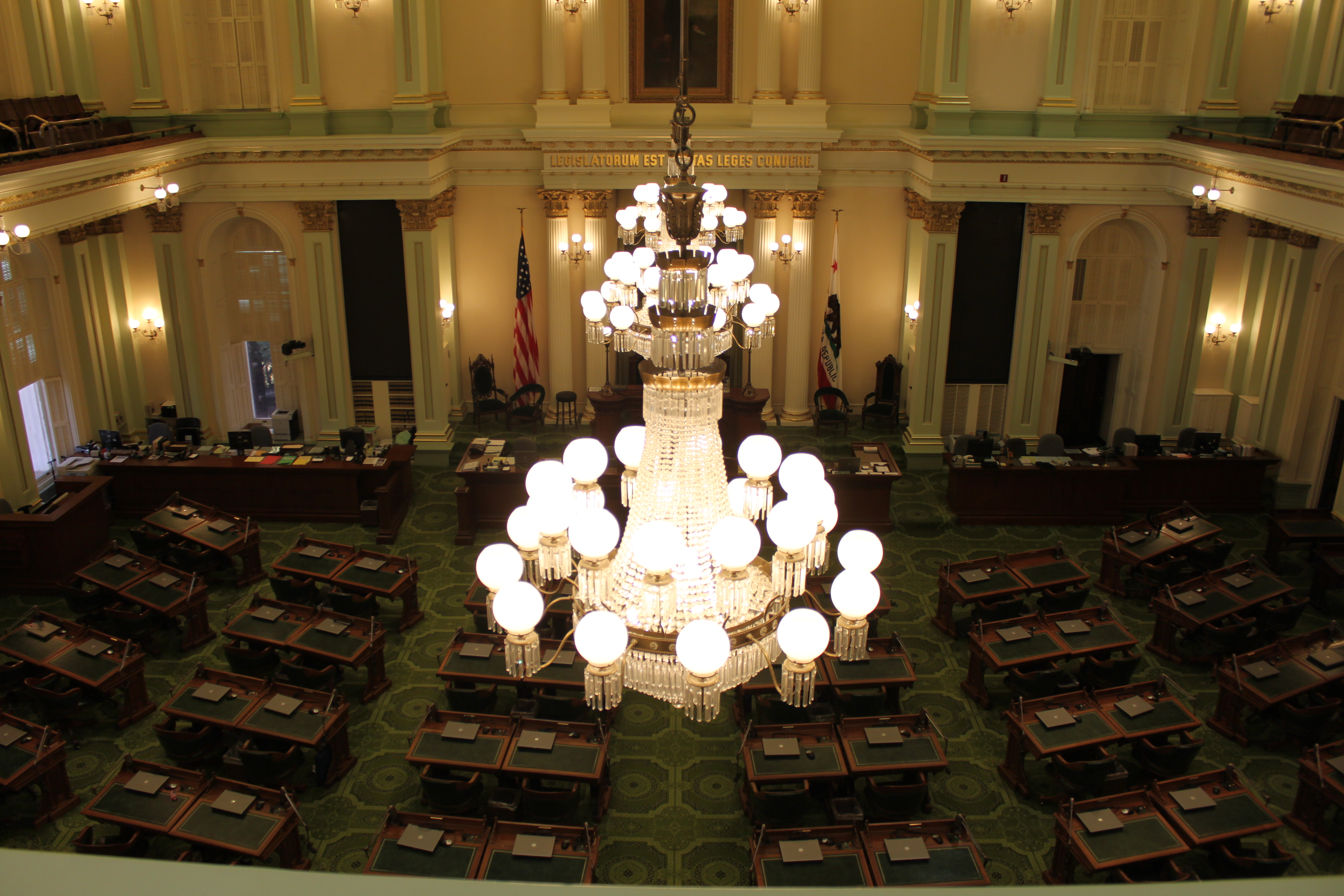
Chamber of the California Assembly

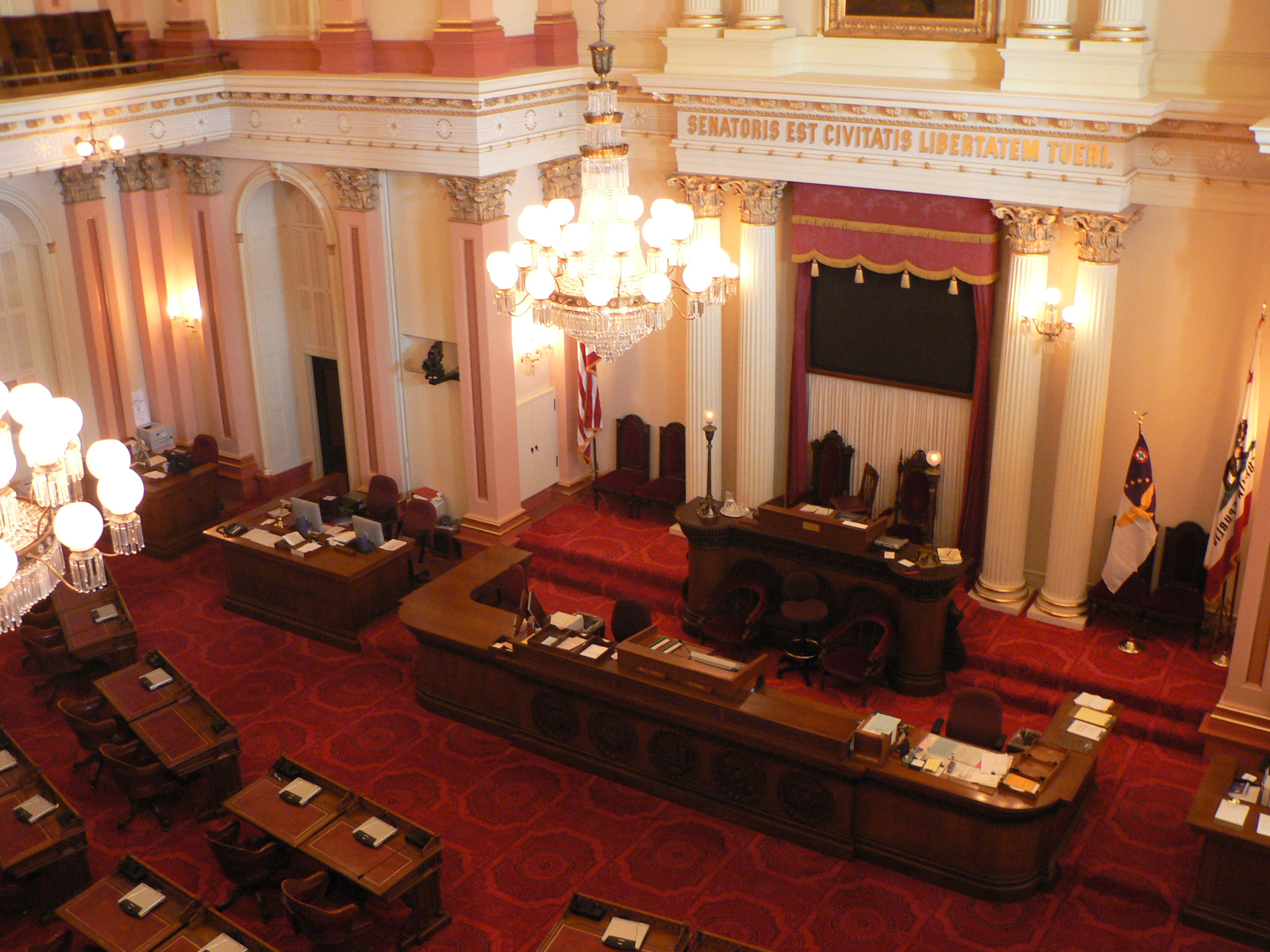
Chamber of the California Senate

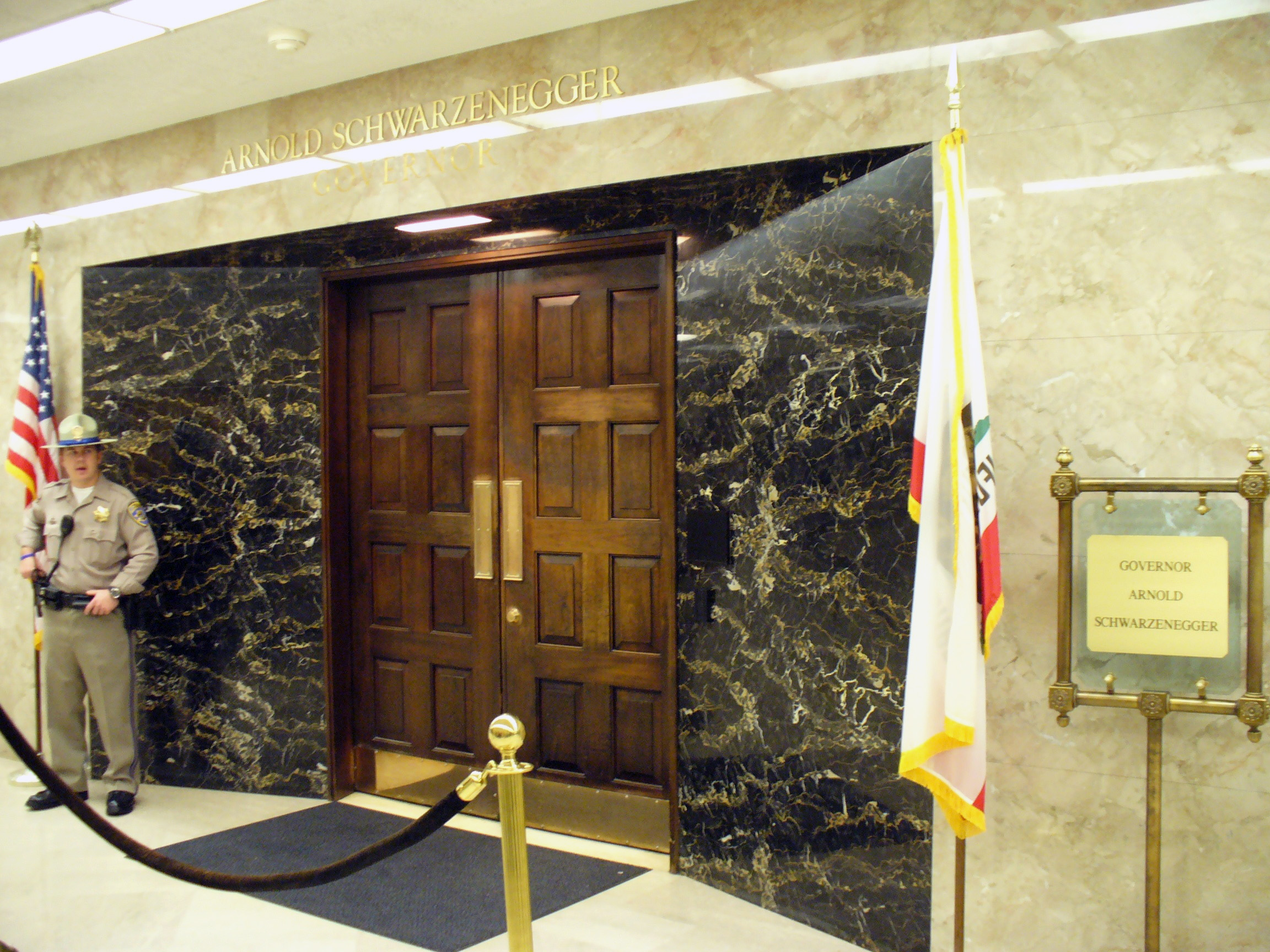
Former Office of the Governor of California, in the now-demolished Annex

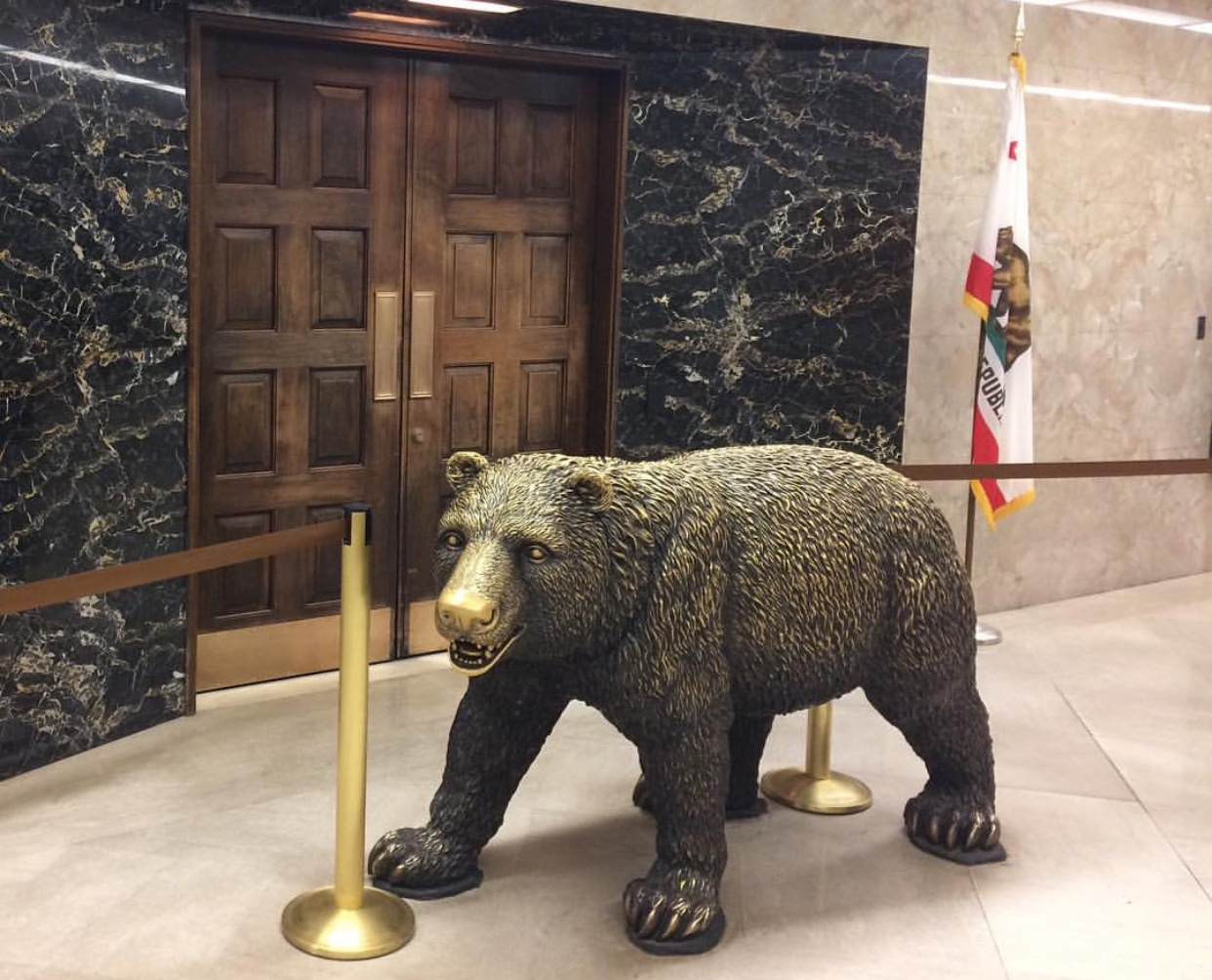
California Grizzly Bear Monument in the now-demolished Annex

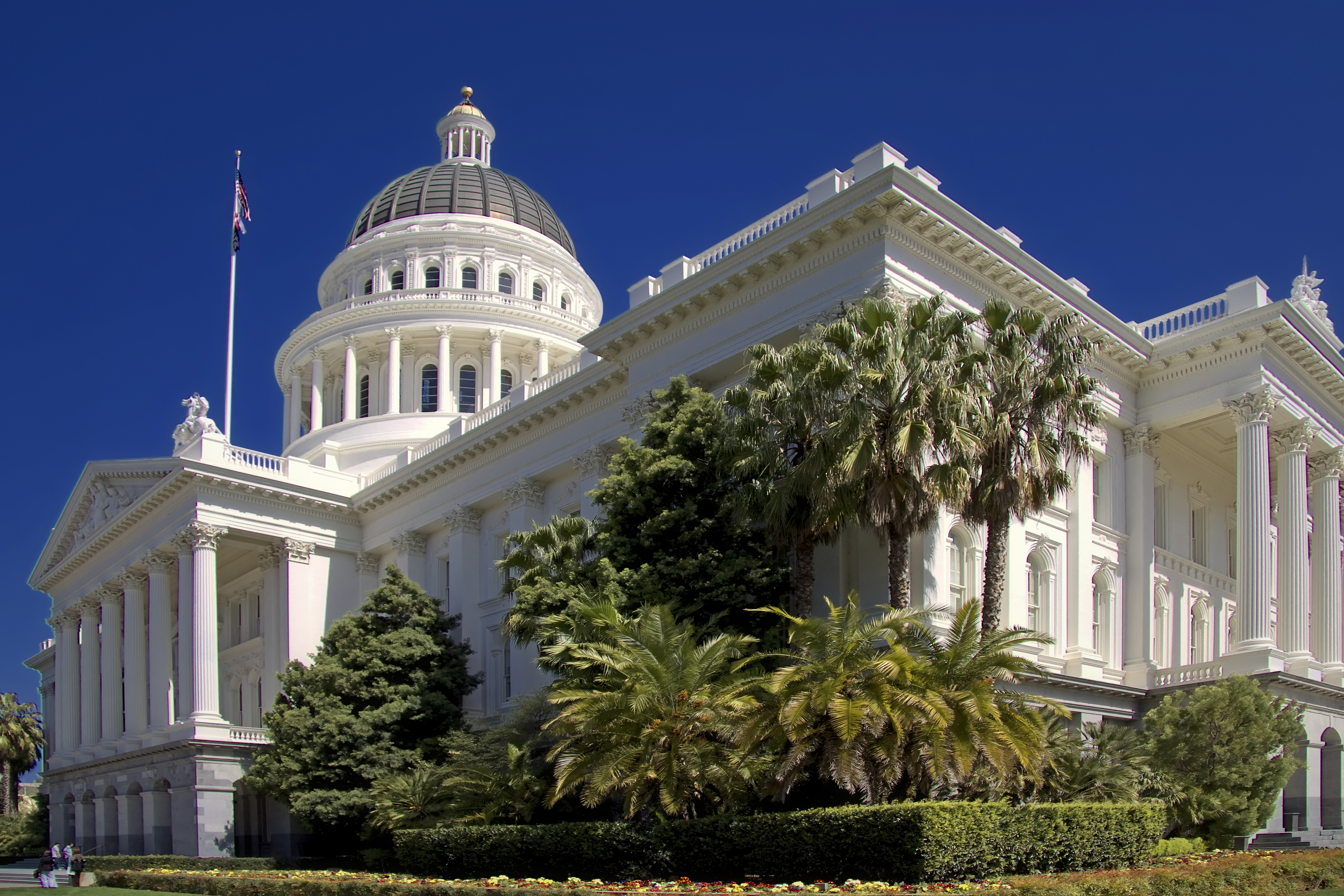
View from the Southwest

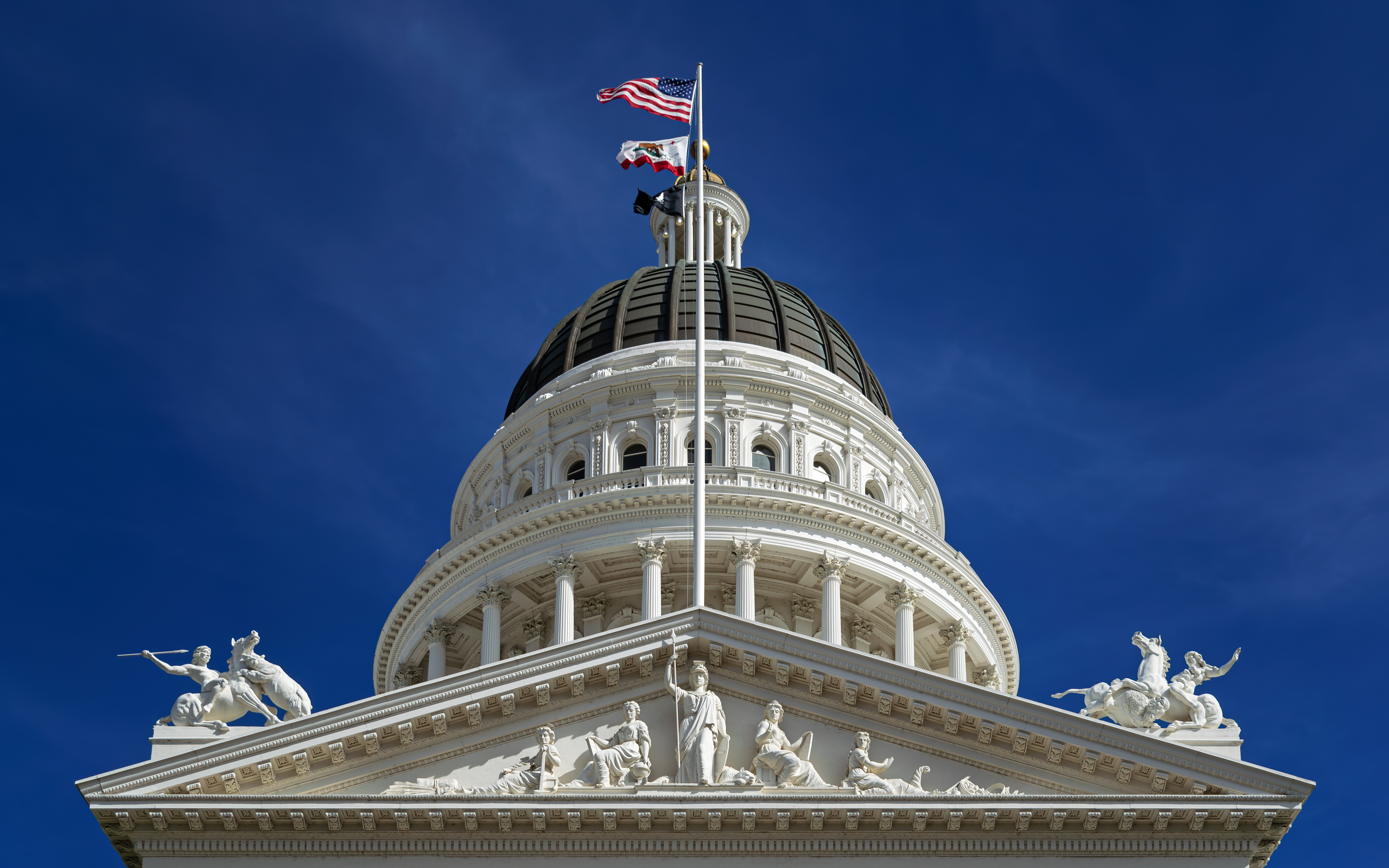
Pediment and rotunda detail

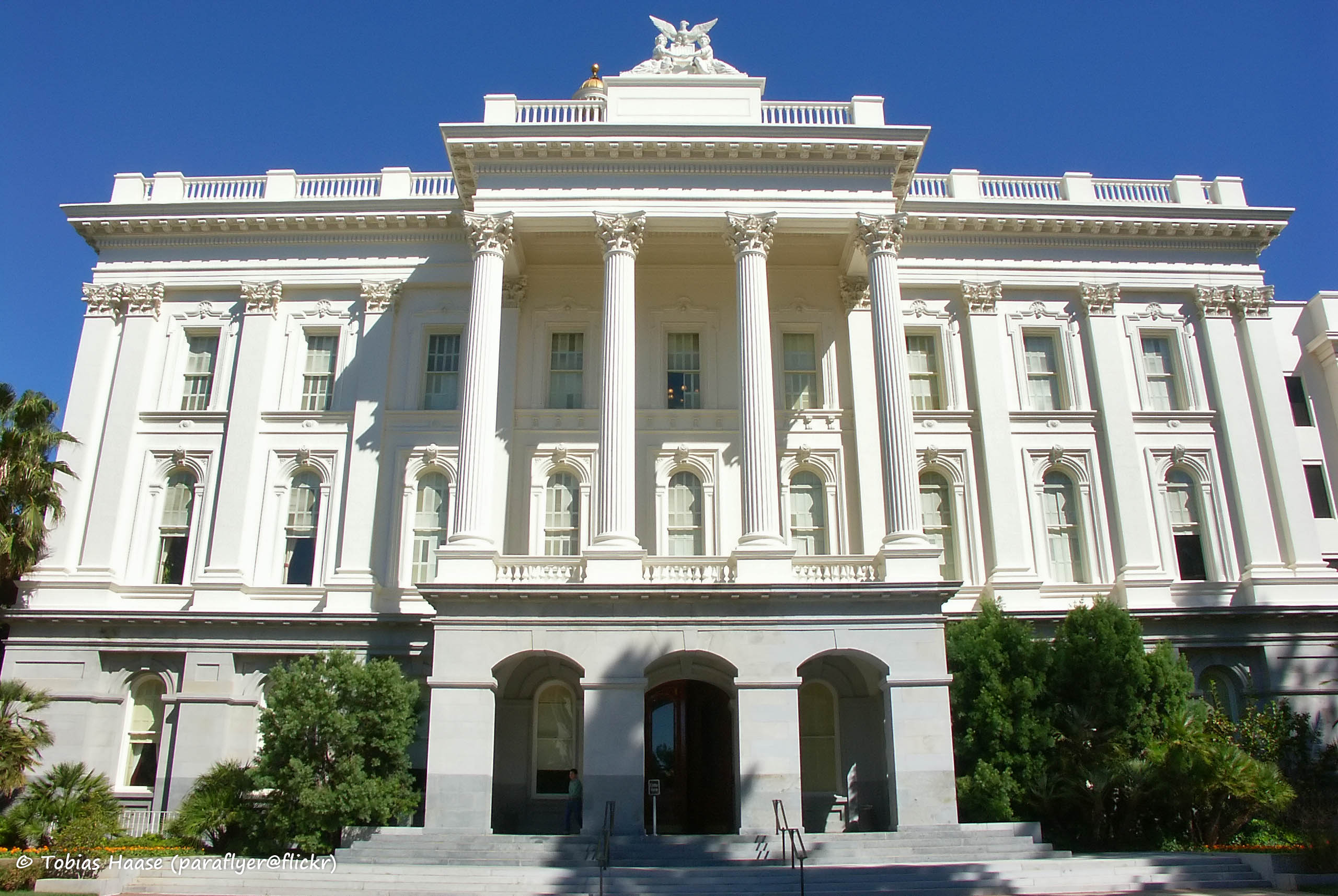
South façade

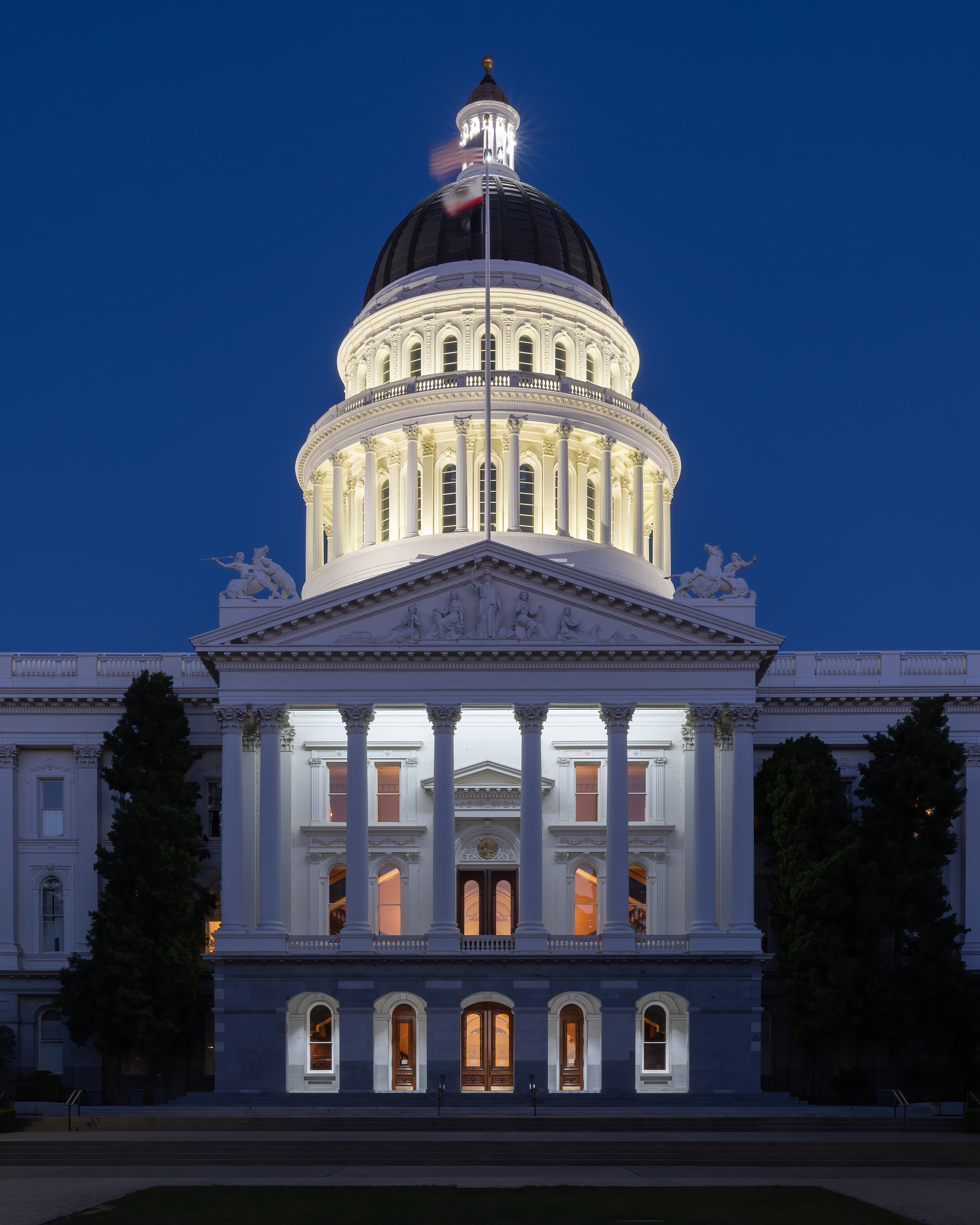
Night view

== See also ==
- California Historical Landmarks in Sacramento County, California
- Former California State Capitol sites
- History of Sacramento, California
- List of state and territorial capitols in the United States
- National Register of Historic Places listings in Sacramento County, California
