= California State Capitol Museum =

Museum in Sacramento, California, United States

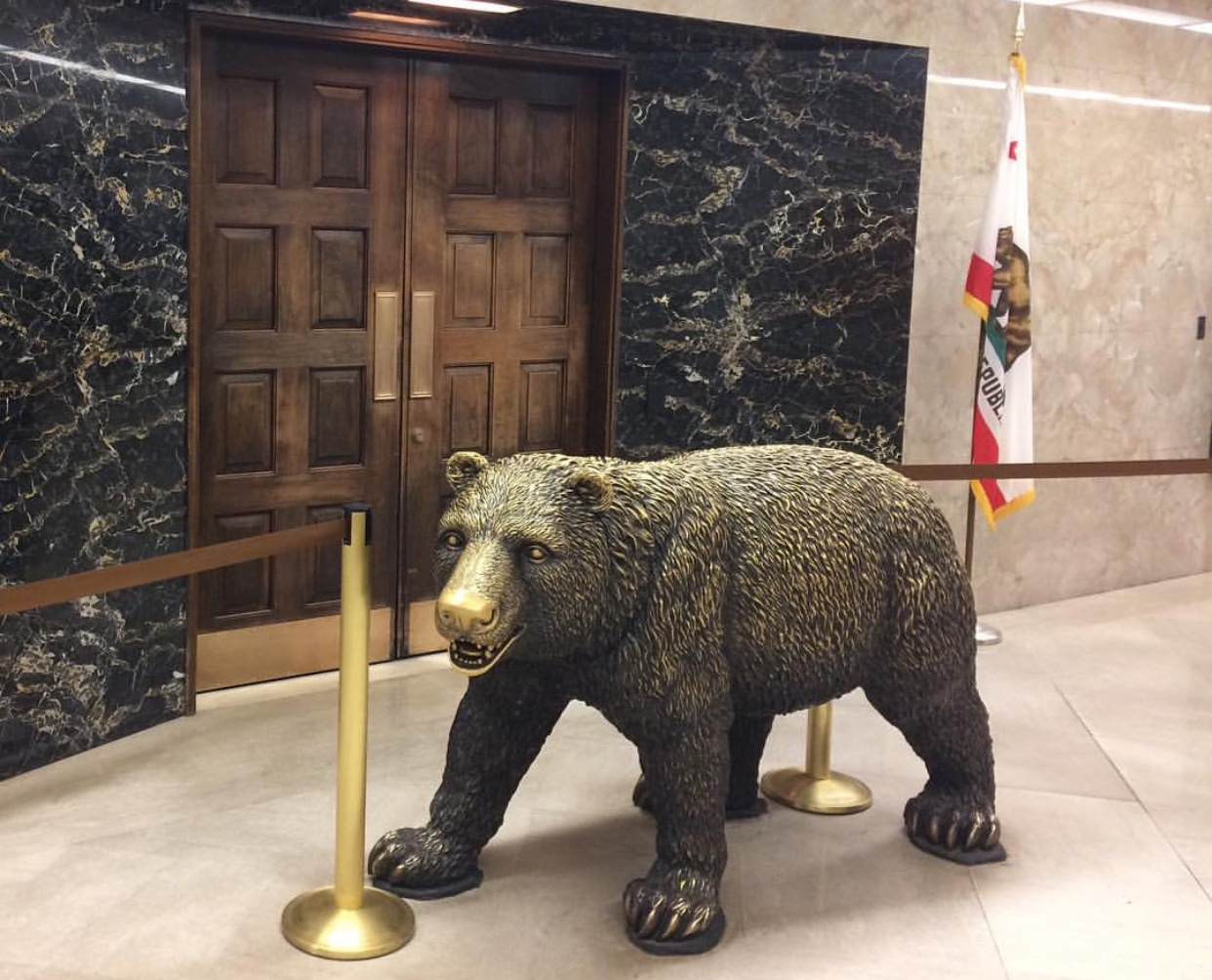
- A statue of the California state animal, California grizzly bear, inside of the California State Capitol Museum prior to the demolition of the East Annex in 2023

- Location within California Location within the United States
- Location: Sacramento County, California, United States
- Nearest city: Sacramento, California
- Coordinates: 38°34′35″N 121°29′36″W
- Area: 40 acres (16 ha)
- Established: 1982
- Governing body: California Department of Parks and Recreation
- Website: capitolmuseum.ca.gov

The California State Capitol Museum consists of a museum in and grounds around the California State Capitol in Sacramento, California, United States. The building has been the home of the California State Legislature since 1869. The State Capitol Museum has been a property in the California State Parks system since 1982.

== Capitol Museum ==
While the entire building may be considered a museum, the heart of the Capitol Museum can be found on the basement and first floor of the original section of the building. In the basement can be found the tour office (B-27), a small theater showing several short films on the history of the Capitol, the gift shop, and the Arthur Mathews mural, the "History of California." On the first floor, visitors can tour the restored historic offices of the secretary of state, treasurer, and governor of California, as well as two rotating exhibit rooms.

From 1883 to 2020, the center of the rotunda housed the marble statue Columbus' Last Appeal to Queen Isabella, sculpted by Larkin Mead and given to California by banker and philanthropist Darius Ogden Mills. A June 2020 joint statement by California Senate Pro Tempore Toni Atkins, Assembly Speaker Anthony Rendon, and Assembly Rules Committee chair Ken Cooley said that the removal of the statue was based on "the deadly impact his arrival in this hemisphere had on indigenous populations." It was removed on July 7, 2020.

== Capitol Park ==
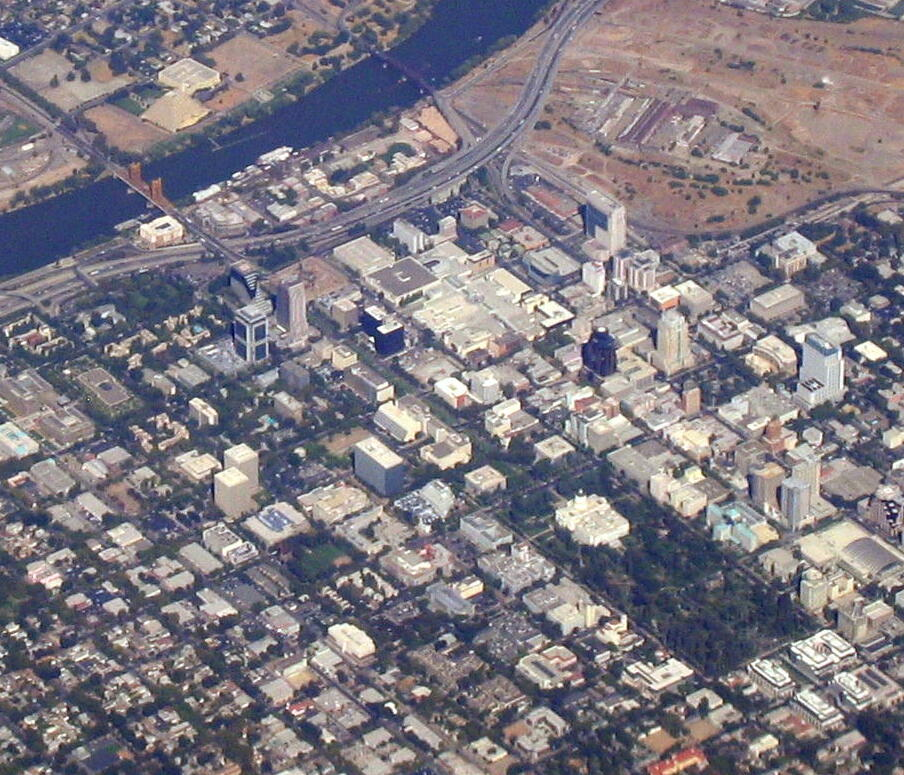
Aerial view of Sacramento (from 2006); Tower Bridge is in the upper left corner, crossing the Sacramento River, leading east along Capitol Mall towards the Capitol building and the Capitol Park grounds

There are 40 acres (16 ha) of gardens in the surrounding Capitol Park, including trees and shrubs from around the world. There are approximately 1140 trees in the park (not including shrubs) representing over 200 types of trees.

The grounds also feature approximately 155 memorials to significant events and people involving California, and other points-of-interest. Only a selection are listed below, grouped by section, roughly from west to east (9th Street to 15th Street), and then from north (L Street) to south (N Street) within each section:

Between 9th and 10th streets:

- The Earl Warren Walk, dedicated to the former Governor and Chief Justice of the U.S. Supreme Court, marks the path he wore on his walks from the Capitol to the Sutter Club.
- El Soldado Memorial to Mexican American Soldiers of World War II, created at the behest of the Sociedad de Madres Mexicanas, Gold Star mothers.
- The California Peace Officer's Memorial, honoring those officers who have died in the line of duty and remembering those they left behind.

Between 10th and 11th streets:

- California Registered Historical Landmark No. 872, denoting the Capitol Complex as landmark.
- The Great Seal of the State of California, cast in bronze and placed at the west steps in 1952, was followed by the Native American and Spanish-Mexican Commemorative seals in 2002.
- The Capitol Cornerstone, near the north entrance, placed in 1978 to replace the original 1861 cornerstone.
- The Apollo 14 Moon Tree, planted as a sapling in 1976 that was grown from a seed (among hundreds) carried by command module pilot Stuart Roosa during the 1971 mission.
- The Sisters of Mercy Memorial, honoring the religious order which arrived in Sacramento in 1857 to care for the children of miners and to serve the sick and homeless. The land they purchased for the site of a school eventually became the site of the Capitol.
- The September 11 Memorial, including a plaque and three rose bushes, dedicated on the one year anniversary of the attacks.
- The California Civil War Veterans plaque, located at the east entrance, dedicated in 1963 to California veterans of that conflict.
- The United States Coast and Geodetic Survey Marker, placed in 1888, is located at 38°34'35"N by 121°29'33"W.
- The Senator Capitol Kitty Memorial, remembering the beloved feline resident of Capitol Park.

Between 11th and 12th streets:

- The Pioneer Camellia Grove created in 1942 by the Native Sons and Daughters of the Golden West in tribute to the pioneers of the city and county of Sacramento.
- A life-sized statue of Junípero Serra, a Roman Catholic missionary sent by Spain to help colonize California. At its base is a map of California's 21 missions, from San Diego to Sonoma.
- Behind Serra's statue stands an El Camino Real Commemorative Bell, placed by the California Federation of Women's Clubs and the California State Automobile Association to celebrate the placing of the original bells along the route in 1906 by the CFWC.
- The Civil War Memorial Grove planted in 1897 with saplings from famous Civil War battlefields.
- Within the grove stands the Reverend Thomas Starr King Memorial, originally one of two statues representing California in Statuary Hall in the U.S. Capitol, but replaced in 2009 by Governor and President Ronald Reagan.
- The Spanish War Veterans Memorial, commonly called "The Hiker," after the appearance of the uniform.
- The ship's bell from USS California, the only dreadnaught-type battleship built on the Pacific Coast. Sunk at Pearl Harbor, she was raised, refitted, and rejoined the fleet in 1944.
- The reproduction of the Liberty Bell, one of fifty-three replicas cast in 1953 as part of a nationwide savings bond drive.
- The World War I Memorial Trees, planted in 1921 in memory of the unknown first California soldier to die in that conflict.
- The Governor Hiram W. Johnson Memorial Parkway, dedicated to the progressive and conservationist Governor.
- The California Department of Transportation Highway Workers Memorial, remembering those CalTrans workers killed in work-related incidents.
- Y-ET-IM TEH-LEI-LI California Indian Grinding Rock

Between 13th and 14th streets:

- California State Insectary, constructed in 1908, now used as a service area for the Department of General Services groundskeeping crew.
- The California Firefighters Memorial erected to honor firefighters from California or who served in California and who died in line of duty or of other duty-related illness or injury.
- The California Veterans Memorial, a granite obelisk honoring California Veterans from the Mexican–American War, Civil War, Spanish–American War, World War I, World War II, the Korean War, the Vietnam War and the Persian Gulf War.
- By the Veterans Memorial stands the Purple Heart Monument, in honor of those veterans killed, wounded, or disabled in combat.

Between 14th and 15th streets:

- The California Vietnam Veterans Memorial, with life-size bronze figures of service men and women depicting military life in Vietnam and featuring engravings of names of Californians killed or missing in action.
- The World Peace Rose Garden, a 0.42 acre garden with about 650 roses in over 140 varieties of colors and fragrances on display.
- The California Native Plant Section, created in 1911 with the efforts of the Native Sons and Daughters of the Golden West, planted almost exclusively with flora native to the state.
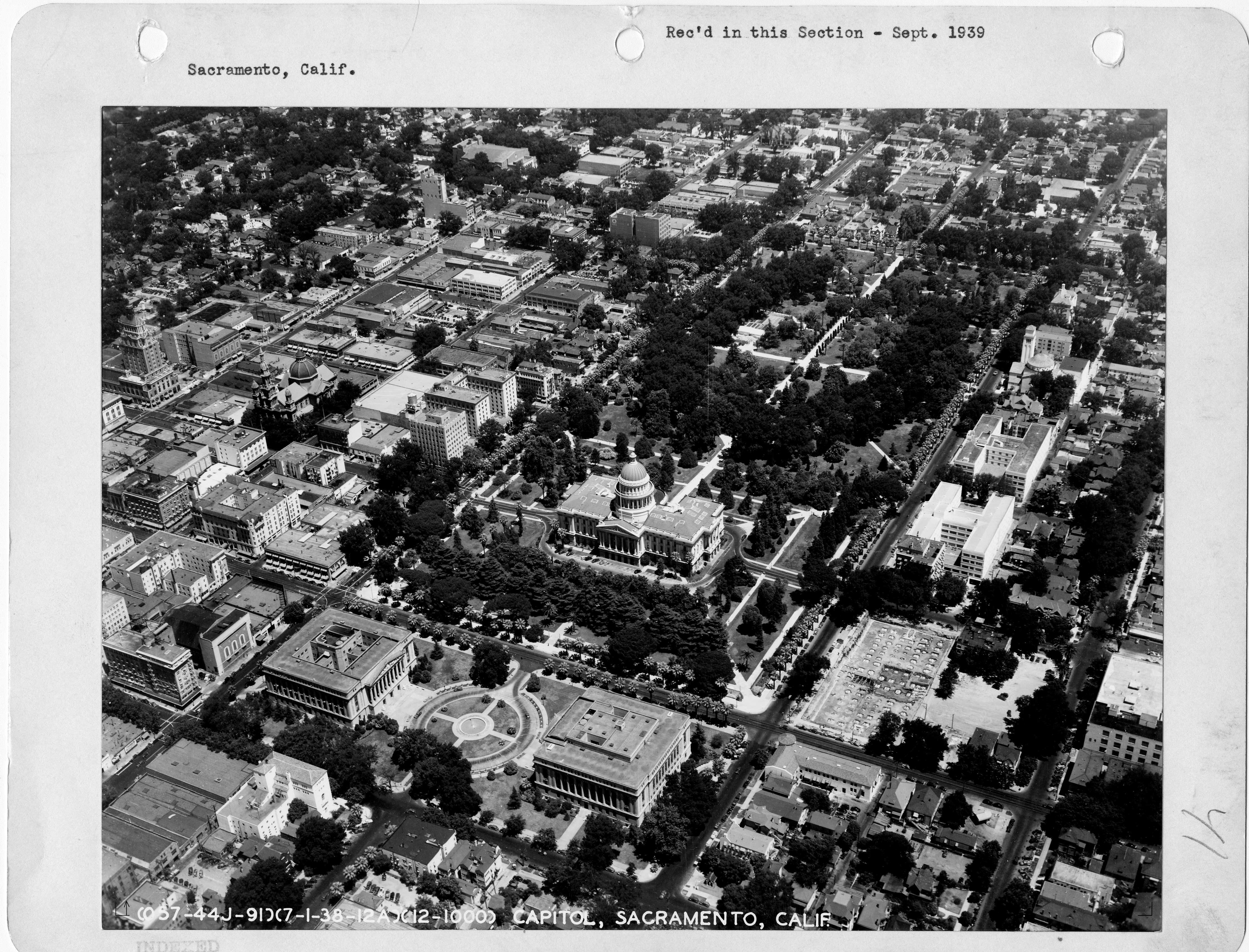
Aerial photograph of Capitol Park, c. 1940s

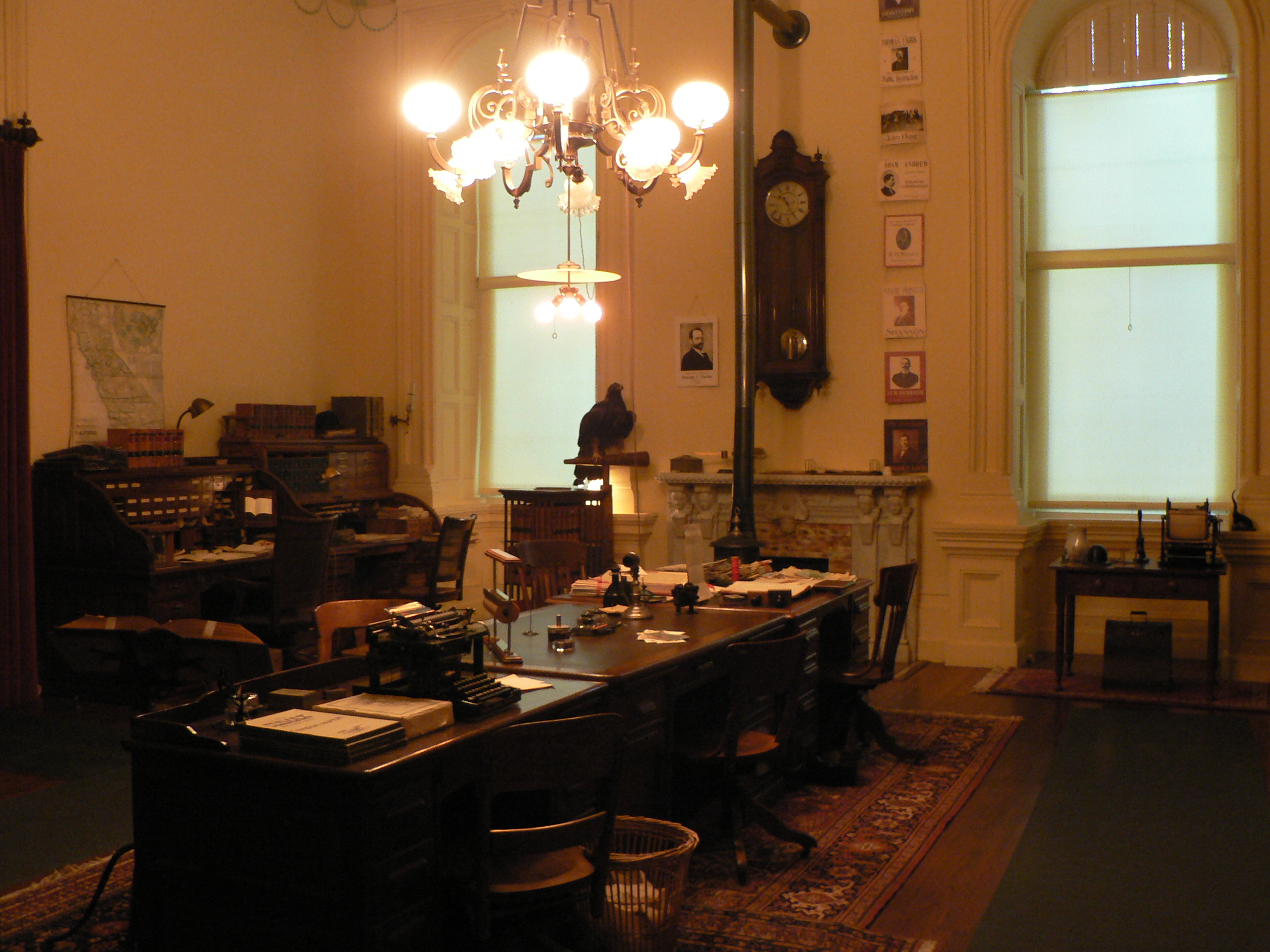
Reconstitution of the office of the California Secretary of State in November 1902

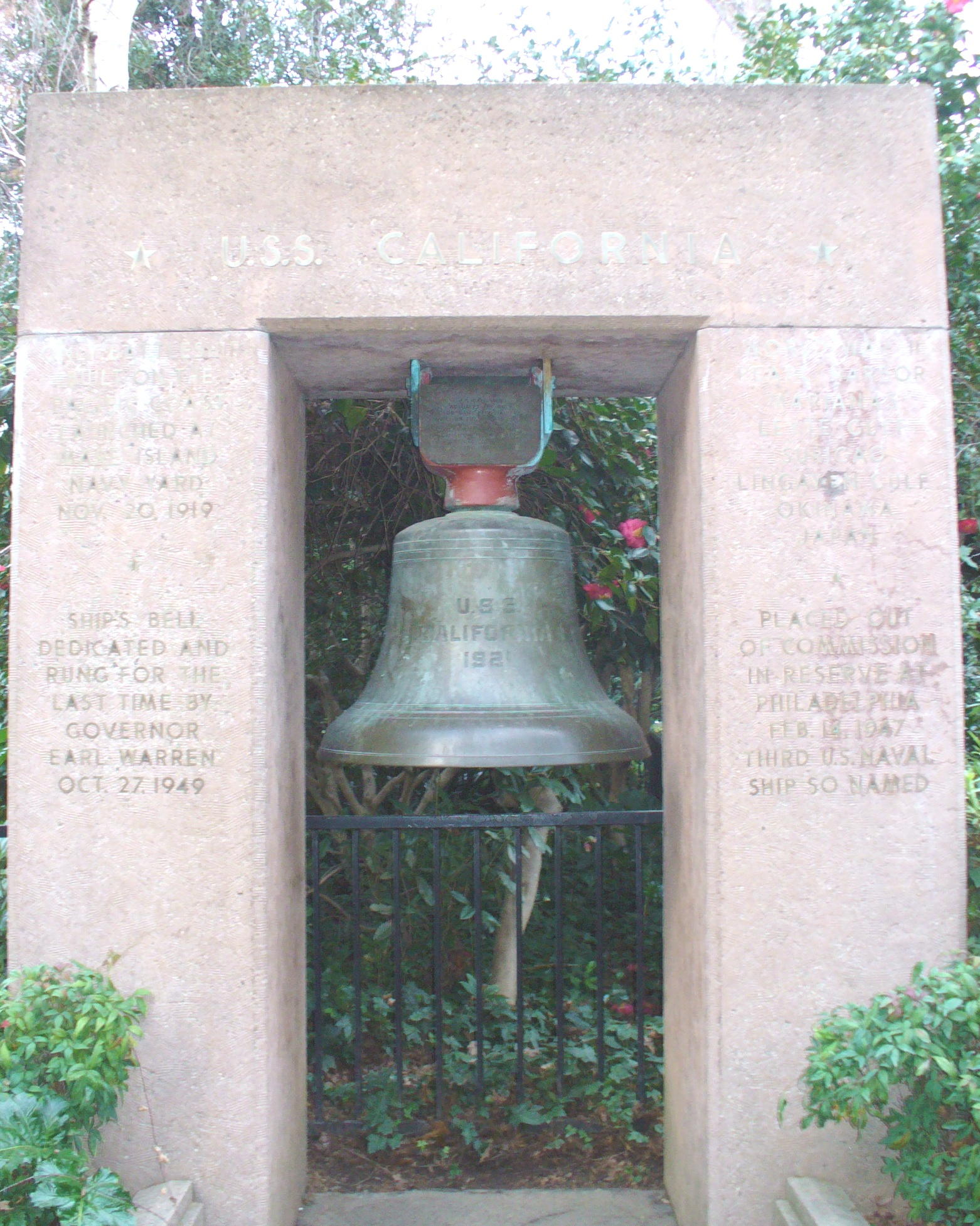
A bell from USS California is on display at the California State Capitol Museum.

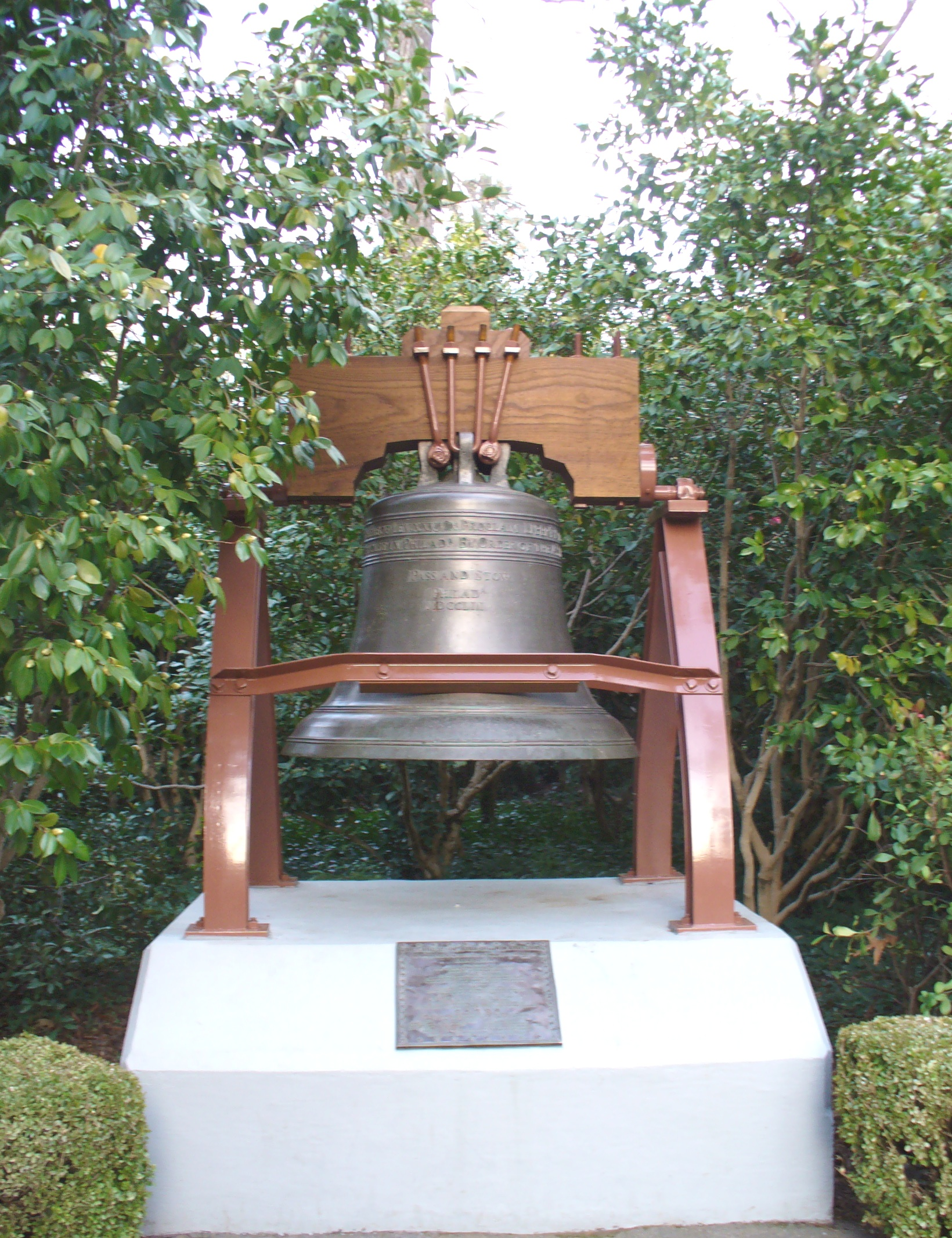
A reproduction of the Liberty Bell is on display at the California State Capitol Museum

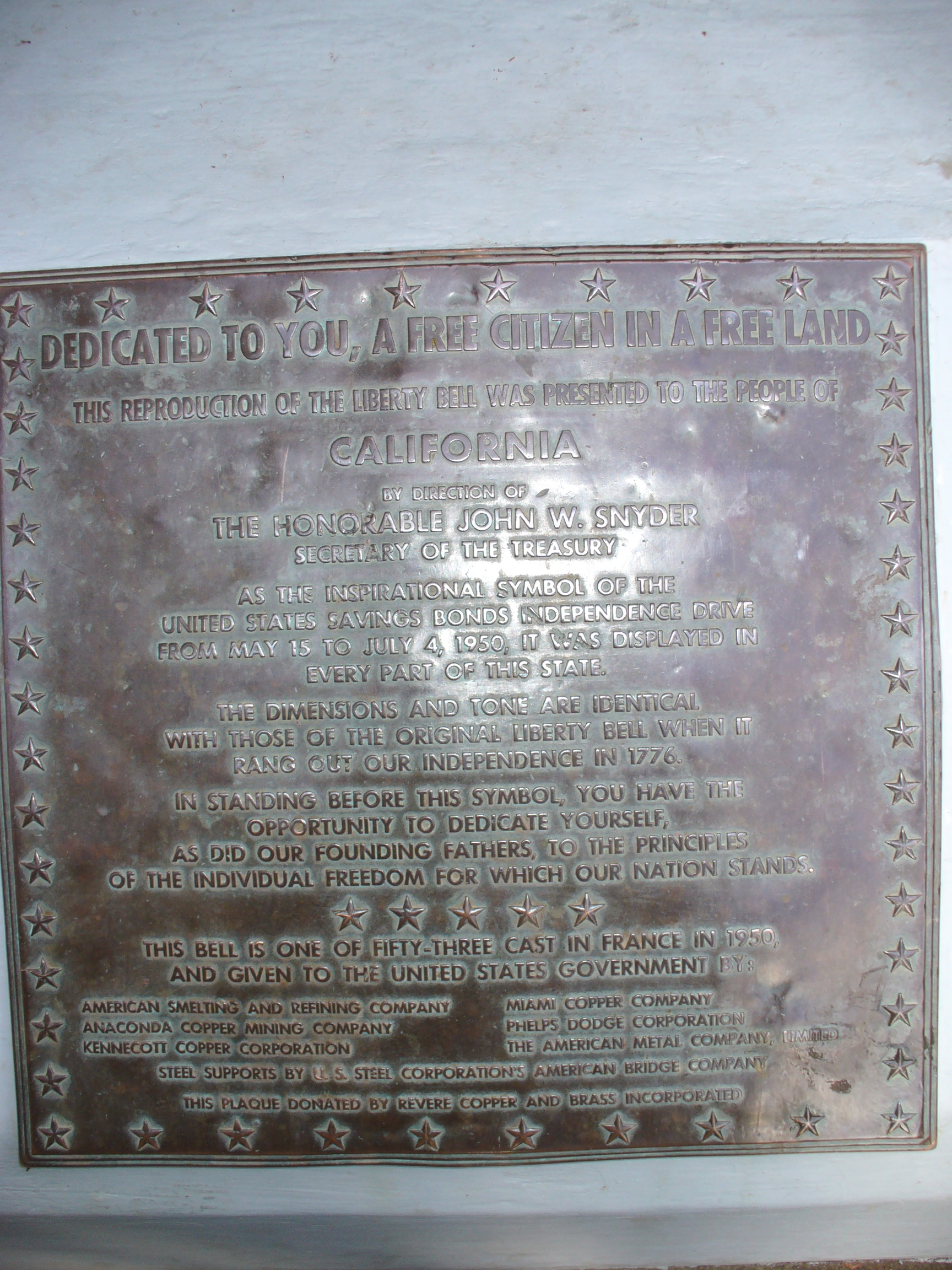
The inscription, which reads, in part: "Dedicated to you, a free citizen in a free land .... In standing before this symbol, you have the opportunity to dedicate yourself, as did our founding fathers, to the principles of the individual freedom for which our nation stands."

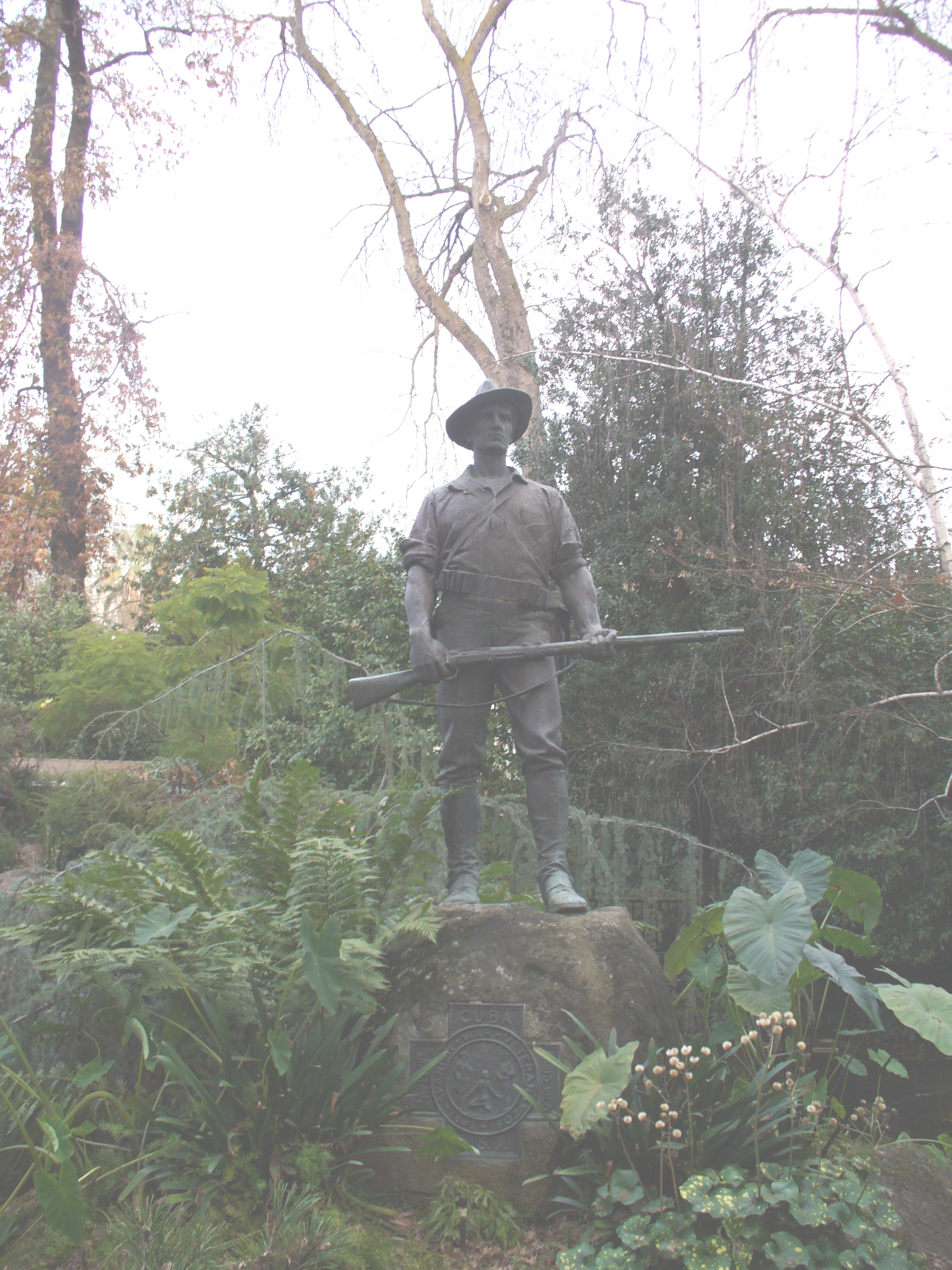
A statue honoring those who served in the Spanish–American War

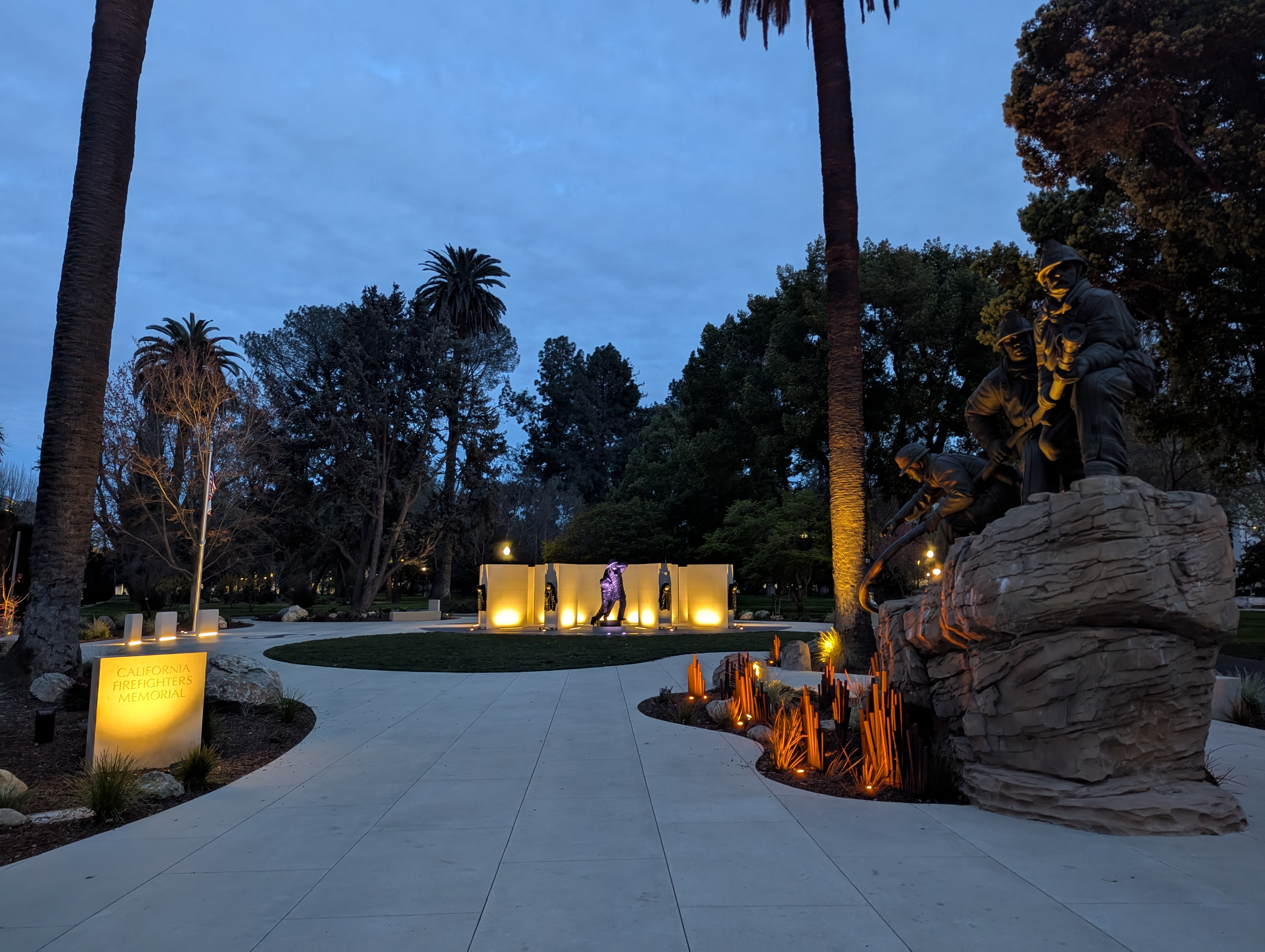
California Firefighters Memorial at dusk

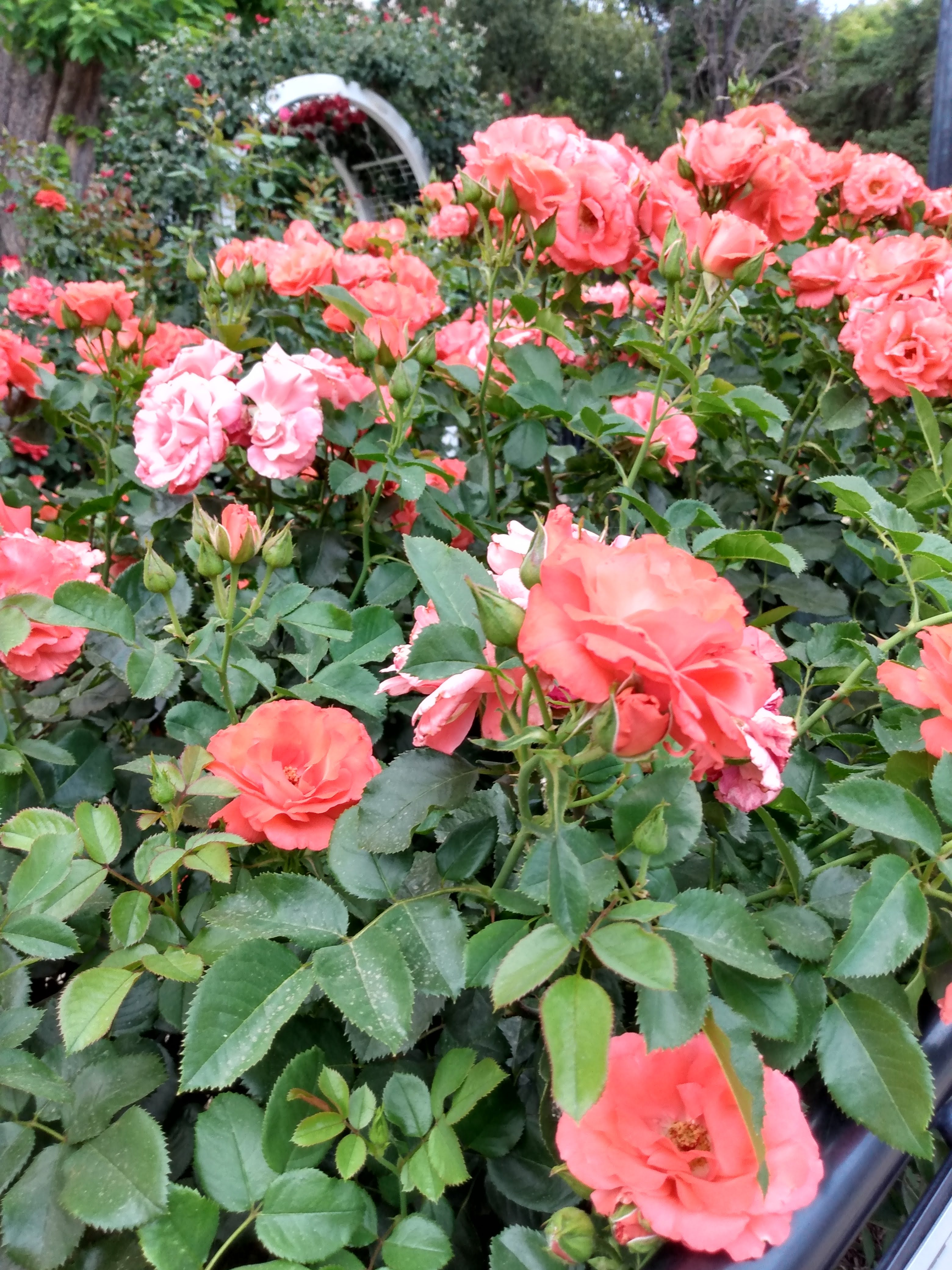
Roses in the California State Capitol World Peace Rose Garden Memorial

== See also ==
- List of museums in California
