= James J. Kenney =

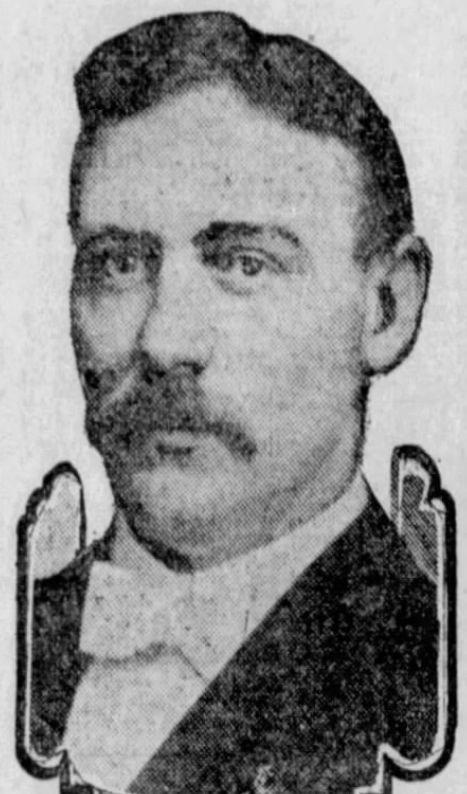
- Born: 1869; San Francisco, California
- Died: March 23, 1916 (aged 46–47); Berkeley, California
- Occupation: Fire chief

James J. Kenney (1869 – March 23, 1916) was the first fire chief in the city of Berkeley, California. He oversaw the mechanization of the department in 1914, the first in the United States west of Mississippi.

== Early life ==
Kenney was born in 1869 in San Francisco, California, one of 3 children. In 1871, his father, James J. Kenney, Sr., an Irish Australian immigrant, served for a year on the Board of Supervisors of the City and County of San Francisco, and was also a fire commissioner there from 1871 to 1875. Kenney's mother, Nellie, was born in Massachusetts of native-born parents. By 1880, Kenney's father moved to the East Bay, where he ran a saloon while his son attended school. After the death of his father, Kenney was taken in by an aunt, Sarah Landers, who operated a concession at the Berkeley Station of the Central Pacific's Berkeley Branch line on Shattuck Avenue in what became the downtown section of Berkeley. Upon her death in 1882, James and another aunt, Elizabeth Kenney, took over the concession. When the railroad (by then, the Southern Pacific) forced them out in 1891, his aunt acquired another location nearby on Center Street. The Kenney store sold books, stationery and candy, and even operated a small lending library. James lived with his aunt and two of her brothers in a small, kit-built cottage in the rear of the Center Street store fronting on Addison Street.

== Career ==
James joined the local volunteer fire company, which had established a station next to the cottage. By 1896, he'd been elected chief of the association of Berkeley volunteer fire companies. In September 1904, a fire destroyed the new city hall. The following month, the city of Berkeley decided to create a paid, professional fire department and James Kenney was chosen as its first fire chief.

Under Kenney's leadership, the department was mechanized by 1914, the first west of the Mississippi, and Berkeley was the second fire department in the United States to adopt the two platoon system of staffing. Kenney also succeeded in getting a retreat for Berkeley firemen established in the resort area of the Russian River.

== Personal life ==
Kenney married Mary Mulbey of Oakland in 1901. The two were married for 15 years. They had no children.

Before he became fire chief, Kenney had long been a close friend of August Vollmer, Berkeley's first police chief and nationally renowned pioneer of modern police work. Vollmer had served as a volunteer fireman in Berkeley before beginning his police career.

== Death ==
On the evening of March 23, 1916, Kenney drove to a fire at the El Dorado Oil Works (a processor of coconut oil and copra) located at the foot of University Avenue in Berkeley. He ran his car into a telephone pole, disabling the car, but emerged from the wreck uninjured. He then proceeded on foot to the fire a few blocks away. After assisting with a hose, Kenney led a group of firefighters into the burning plant, but they were forced to retreat from the heat and smoke. Kenney collapsed on the sidewalk, and his cousin, Stephen Kenney, a fire captain, got him to a car and rushed him to Roosevelt Hospital (later called Herrick Hospital, today, a part of Alta Bates Summit Medical Center). He was pronounced dead on arrival.

A huge public funeral was held on March 27. Firefighters from throughout the Bay Area marched through downtown Berkeley, and a funeral mass was held at St. Joseph's Church. Kenney was laid to rest at Saint Mary Cemetery in Oakland.

== Legacy ==
The City of Berkeley created the public park James Kenney Park in Kenney's honor. in 1917. The park is located on the block bounded by 8th, Virginia, 7th and Delaware Streets in the neighborhood of West Berkeley. The park was by visited by local kids including baseball's Billy Martin, in what was for many decades a predominantly working class section of Berkeley. It remains in use and includes a baseball diamond, a recreation center and several basketball courts.

Kenney is named on the California Firefighters Memorial wall.
