= 1021 O Street =

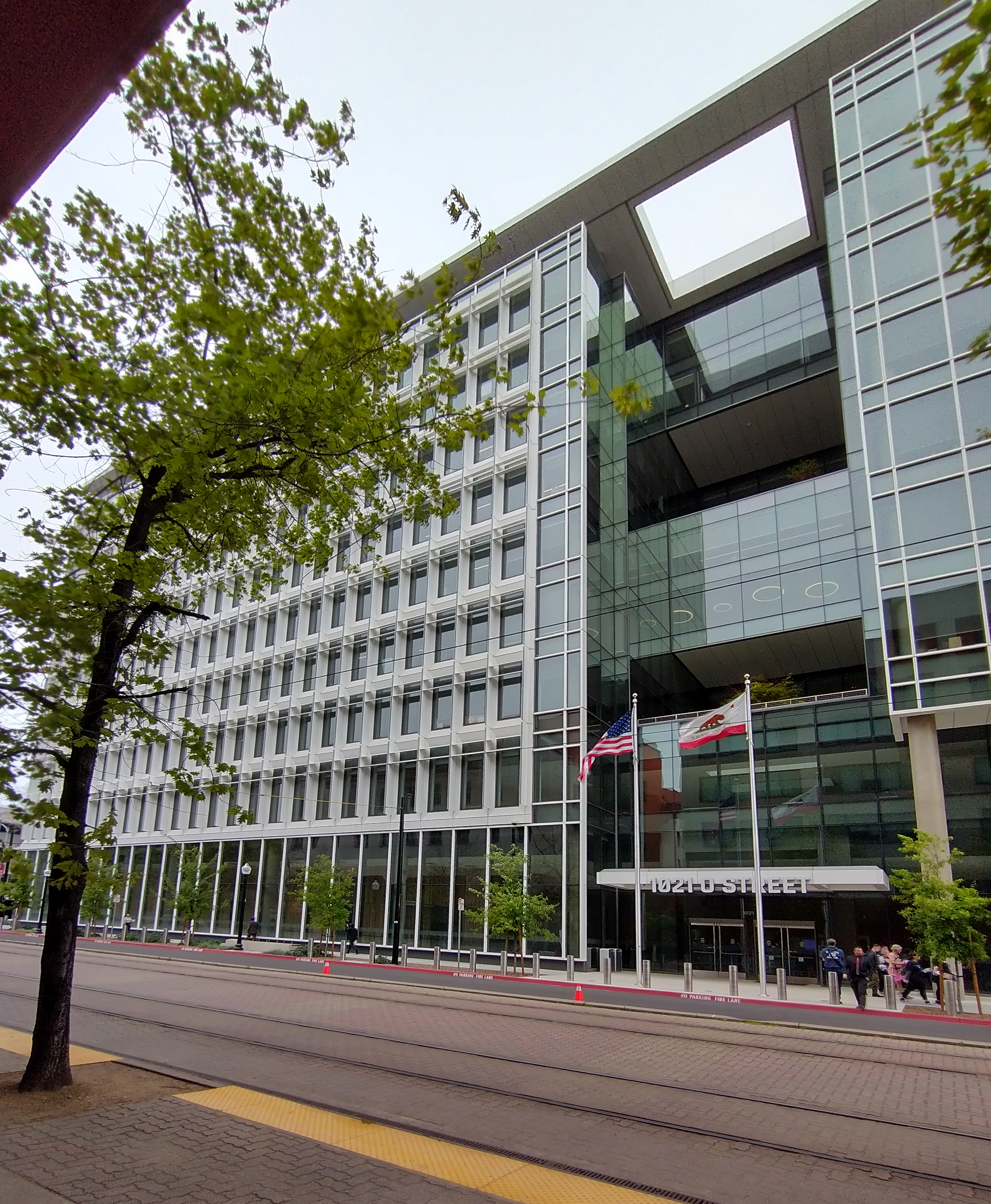
- Interactive map of the 1021 O Street area
- Alternative names: Capitol Annex Swing Space

General information
- Status: Completed
- Type: Office
- Architectural style: Modernism
- Location: 1021 O Street, Sacramento, CA, United States
- Coordinates: 38.575001°N 121.495082°W
- Current tenants: California State Legislature, Governor of California
- Groundbreaking: 2019
- Completed: 2021
- Opened: 2022
- Cost: $430 million

Technical details
- Floor count: 10
- Floor area: 478,000 square feet
- Lifts/elevators: 6

Design and construction
- Architecture firm: HOK
- Developer: State of California Department of General Services
- Main contractor: Hensel Phelps Construction

Other information
- Public transit: Archives Plaza station

1021 O Street is a 10-story office building located in downtown Sacramento, two blocks south of the California State Capitol. Currently known as the Capitol Annex Swing Space, the building was built to house offices for the California State Legislature, the Governor of California, and other state officials during the replacement of the Capitol Annex, a 1952 office building attached to the east side of the Capitol.

== History ==
Prior to construction, the site was a parking lot. The Legislature authorized the project in 2018. Completion was in 2021, and offices were moved in December 2021 after the end of the 2021 legislative session, with the building opening to the public in January 2022. Compared to the old Annex, the Swing Space has larger offices, and is also more energy efficient, being designed to meet zero net carbon and zero net energy standards.

== Description ==
The building contains hearing rooms on the first two floors, offices for Assemblymembers and State Senators on floors 3–8, and offices of the Governor and other statewide executive elected officials on floors 9–10. The building is open to the public, however, only three of the elevators (which use destination dispatch are available for public use, with the other three reserved for elected officials.

== Gallery ==
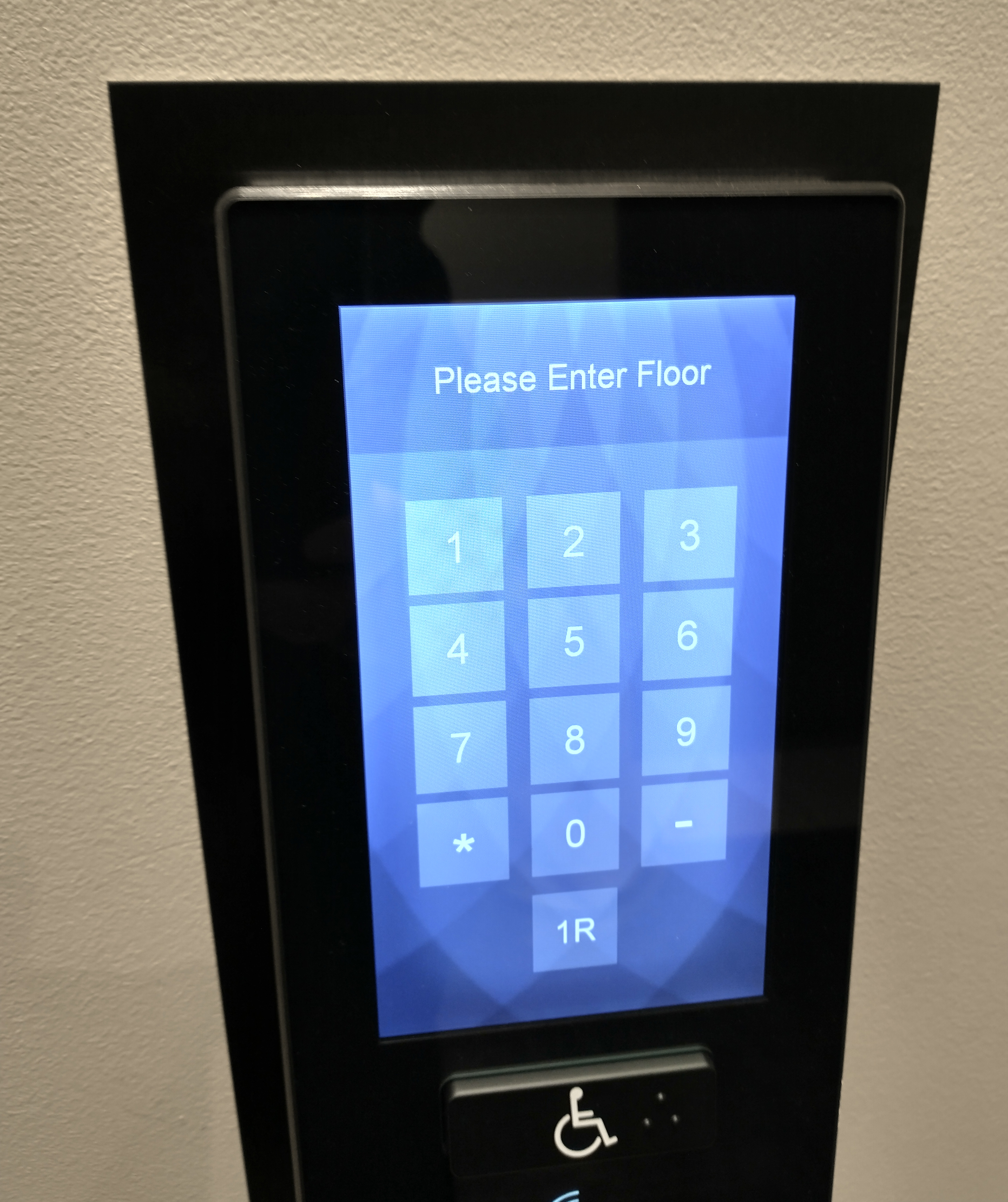
Destination dispatch panel for the 1021 O Street elevators

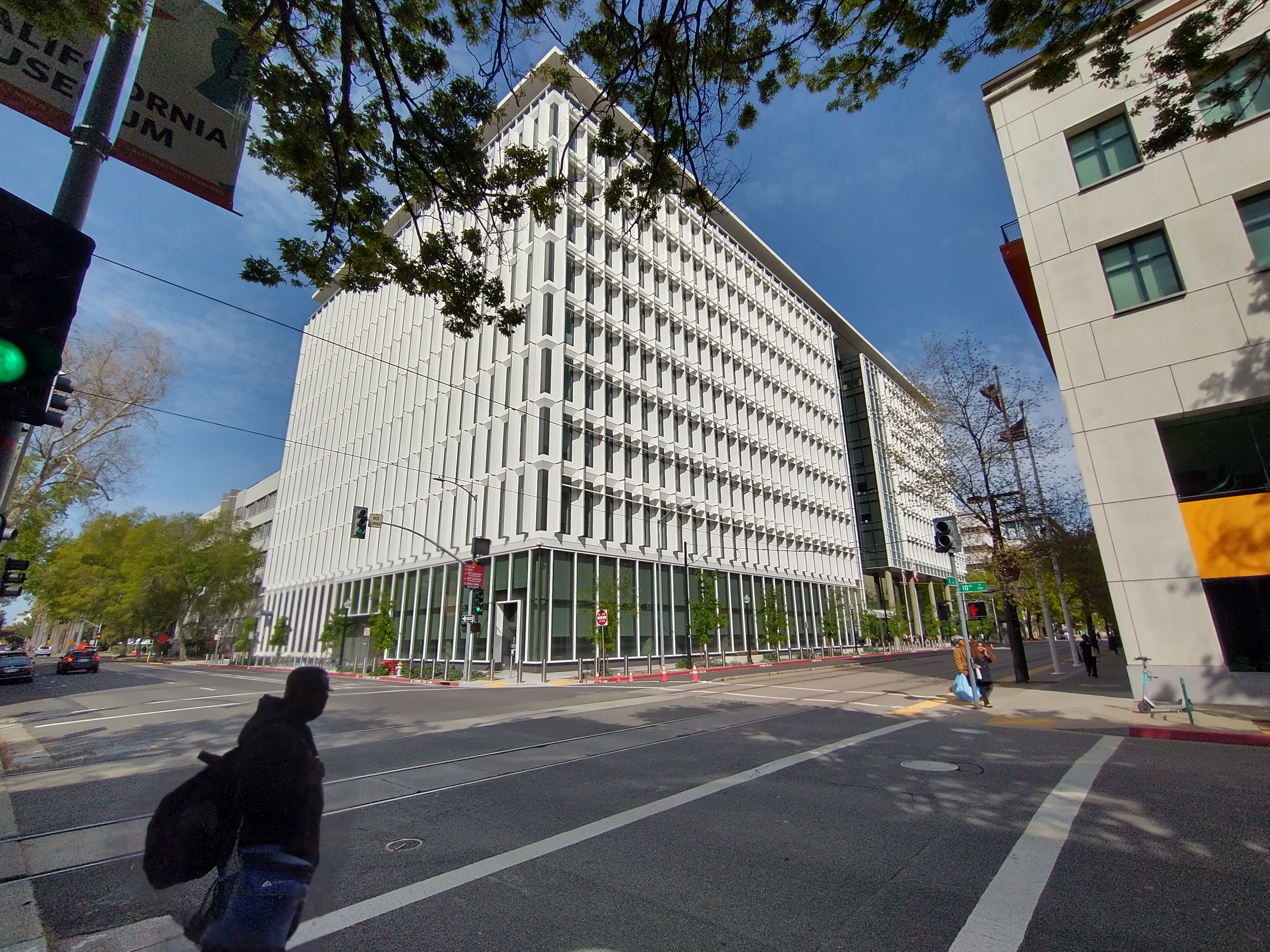
View from corner of 10th and O Street
