= California Firefighters Memorial =

Public monument in Sacramento, California

The 17th Annual California Firefighter Memorial ceremony in September 2019.

The California Firefighters Memorial is a memorial located on the grounds of the California State Capitol in Sacramento, California. It honors firefighters from California or who served in California and who died in line of duty or of other duty-related illness or injury. A memorial ceremony is held each year to honor firefighters who died in the line of duty and to add their names to the memorial wall. This ceremony is usually held in late September.

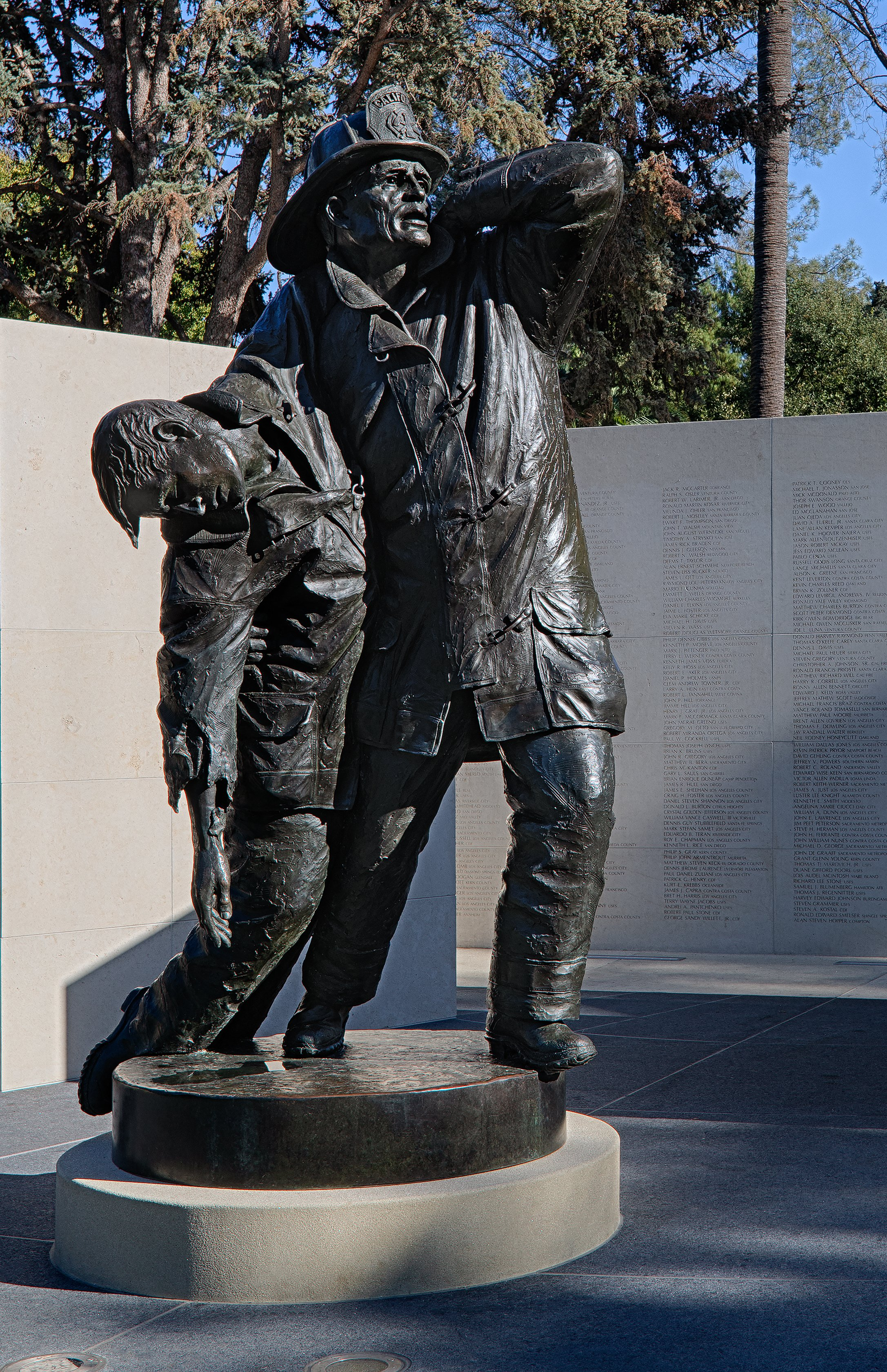
Fallen Brother by Jesus Romo & Romo Studios

The original design, unveiled on April 6, 2002 included a limestone memorial wall and two bronze statues: "Fallen Brother" by noted artist and retired Sacramento Fire Department Battalion Chief Jesus Romo and "Holding the Line" by artist Lawrence Noble. The original site design was provided by the Jerde Partnership.

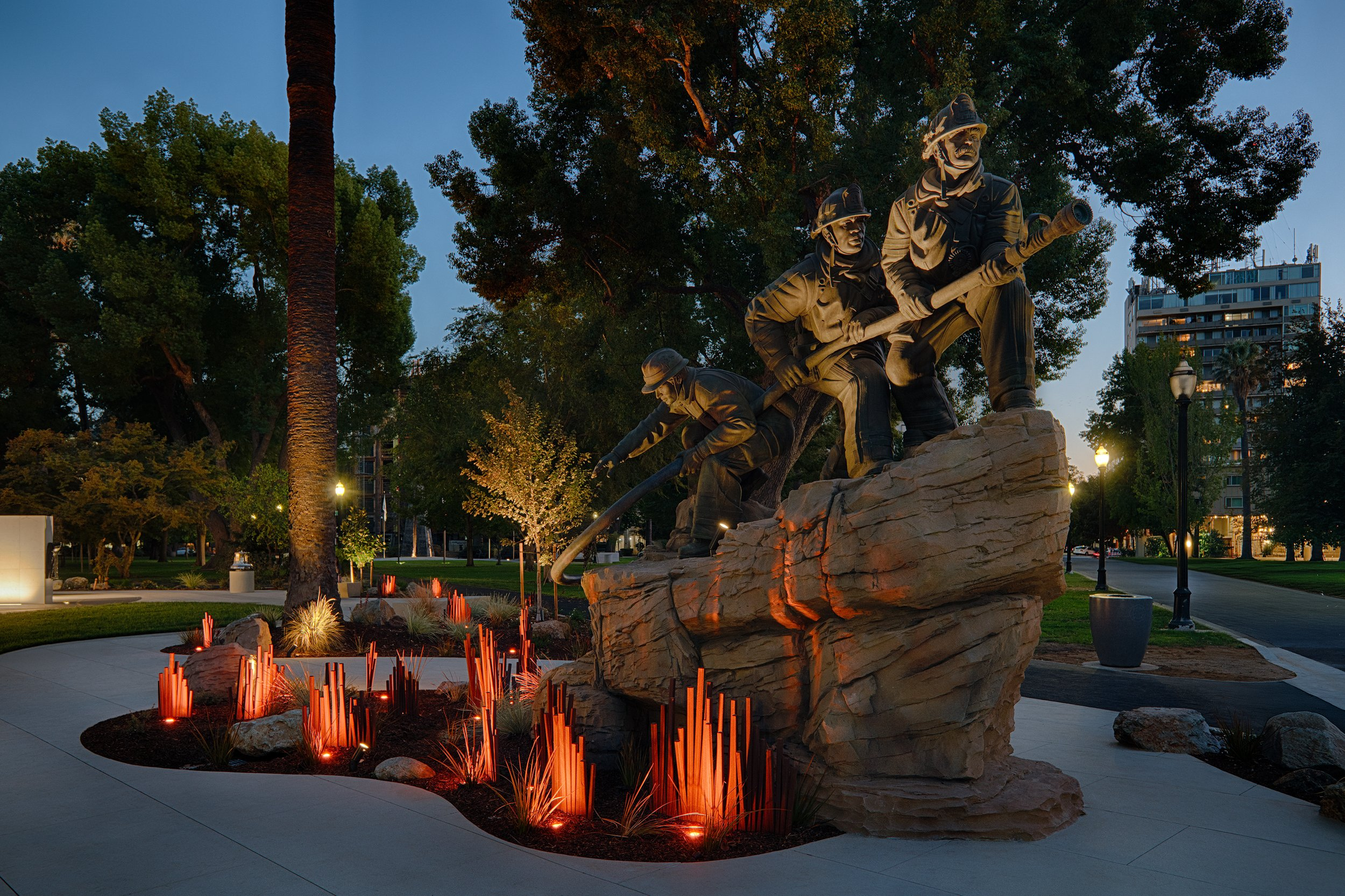
CA Firefighters' Memorial Entrance, night scene

In recent years, The California Fire Foundation has committed itself to the expansion of the Memorial to ensure more room can be added for the fallen and to allow for a sacred place for families to gather and honor their loved ones and keep the memories of the fallen alive for future generations. To that end, the California Fire Foundation commissioned renowned public works artist Adan Romo, of the design firm Romo Studios to redesign and expand the memorial. See details about the award winning design here CA Firefighters Memorial Expansion Design Phase 1 of the expanded memorial was completed and unveiled on October 11th 2024 and is open to the public.

The California Fire Foundation provides critical support to surviving families of fallen firefighters, firefighters, and the communities they serve. Your tax-deductible donation will help commemorate fallen heroes, offer scholarships to children of fallen firefighters, provide aid to victims of fire or other natural disaster, and provide fire safety resources to underserved communities across California. Donate to CA Fire Foundation

The memorial is in the Capitol Park between 13th and 14th Streets and is managed by the California State Capitol Museum. A "California Firefighters Memorial Fund" was created which received proceeds from the California Motor Vehicles Department from sales of special vehicle license plates, under a program established by Section 18802 of the California Revenue and Taxation Code. It also received donations designated for the fund received by the California Franchise Tax Board in state income tax filings, and from calendar sales.

== Tragedy prompts safety ==
The memorial honors Cal Fire firefighters and numerous others from various other municipal and wildland firefighting agencies, who have died from duty-related causes, some medical in nature, and others which occurred on-duty while directly engaged in an emergency incident. Typically these on-duty incident related deaths are analyzed and examined more closely than deaths from other medical reasons. Improvements in firefighting safety derived from case-studies of fatal firefighter incidents may be regarded as memorials, too. For example, flame resistant nomex clothing and upgraded training were required for Cal Fire employees after Steve Arrollado was burned in the Bell Valley fire. The wildland fire shelter was mandated for all Cal Fire firefighters after the Spanish Ranch fire in 1979, and it was redesigned and improved after the disastrous South Canyon fire near Glenwood Springs, CO. in 1994. The 1990 death of Kenneth Enslow prompted use of the "Look Up, Look Down" safety training program for Cal Fire employees. A variety of firefighting air tanker crashes eventually led to wider inspections and removing the oldest and most vulnerable large air tankers from the national wildland firefighting fleet.

== Firefighter fatalities memorialized ==
Names included on the California Firefighter Foundation's memorial wall as part of the California State Capitol Museum, Sacramento, CA. can be found here. Notable among these is James J. Kenney.

== See also ==
- List of firefighting monuments and memorials
