= Destination dispatch =

Optimization technique for multi-elevator installations

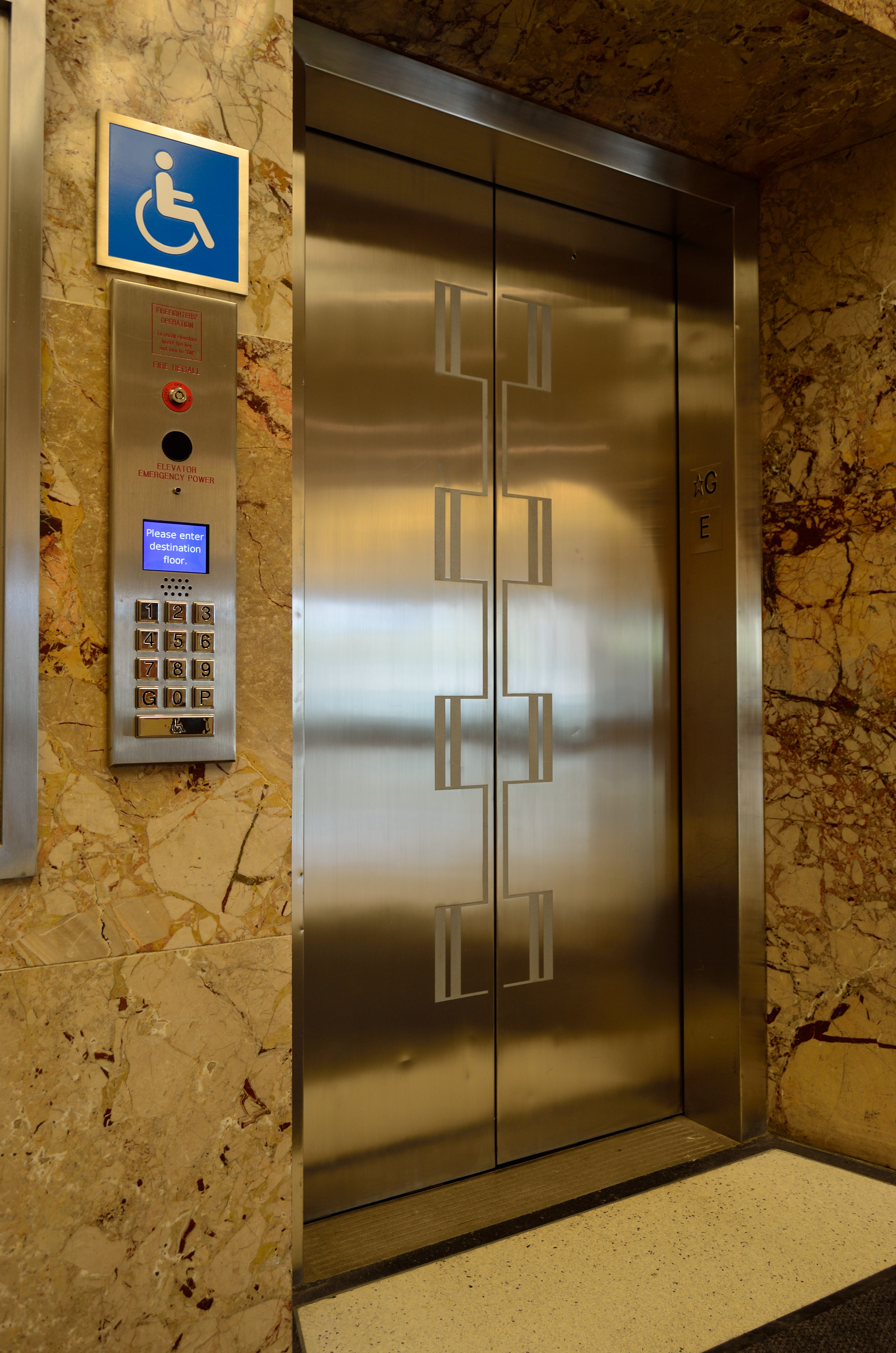
A destination dispatch elevator, here using a Compass system from Otis.

Destination dispatch is an optimization technique used for multi-elevator installations, in which groups of passengers heading to the same destinations use the same elevators, thereby reducing waiting and travel times. This contrasts with the traditional approach, in which each passenger calls for and enters the first available lift and then, once inside, requests their destination.

Using destination dispatch, passengers request travel to a particular floor using a keypad, touch screen, or proximity card (such as a hotel room keycard) and are then directed to an appropriate elevator car selected by an algorithm. The elevator then takes each passenger to their destination, with no further input after entering the car.

== History ==
The idea of a destination dispatch elevator was first conceived in 1961 by then-future Lord Mayor of Sydney Leo Port. The system was dubbed Port-El, a play on the words “portal” “elevator”, and his last name. It was patented in 1961. It did not come to full fruition at the time, as the mechanical relays that controlled elevators were not well suited for complex algorithms, and the patent expired in 1977. Port-El systems were installed in the Law School at the University of Sydney, as well as in the Australian Milk Marketing Board offices. Port allowed his invention's patent to expire in 1977, though he is recognised as the first inventor to propose and design the first destination dispatch elevators.

Microprocessor-controlled elevators that could support destination dispatch were first implemented in the late 1970s and became more widespread in the 1980s. The first destination dispatch to be introduced was the Miconic 10 system, introduced in 1990 by Schindler Group.

== Algorithms ==
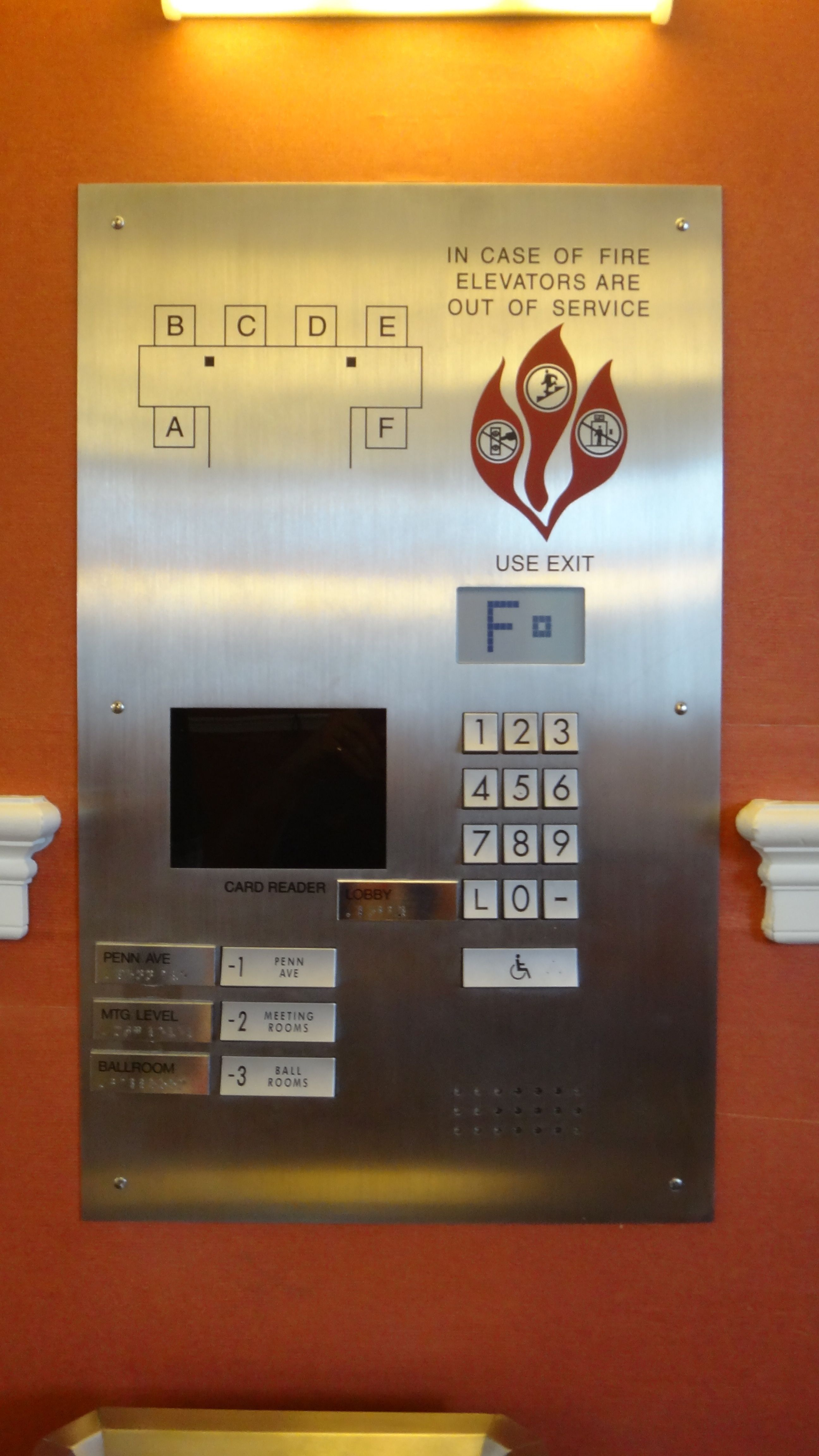
Destination dispatch controls, here of Miconic 10 system from Schindler. This elevator is from JW Marriott hotel in Washington D.C.

Based on information about the trips that passengers wish to make, the controller will dynamically allocate individuals to elevators to avoid excessive intermediate stops. Overall trip-times can be reduced by 25% with capacity up by 30%.

Controllers can also offer different levels of service to passengers based on information contained in key-cards. A high-privilege user may be allocated the nearest available elevator and always be guaranteed a direct service to their floor, and may be allocated an elevator with exclusive use; other users, such as disabled people, may be provided with accessibility features such as extended door-opening times.

== Limitations ==
The smooth operation of a destination dispatch system depends upon each passenger indicating their destination intention separately. In most cases, the elevator system has no way of differentiating a group of passengers from a single passenger if the group's destination is only keyed in a single time. This could potentially lead to an elevator stopping to pick up more passengers than the elevator actually has capacity for, creating delays for other users. This situation is handled by two solutions, a load vane sensor on the elevator, or a group function button on the keypad. The load vane will tell the elevator controller that there is a high load in the elevator car, this makes it so the elevator doesn't stop at other floors until the load is low enough to pick up more passengers. The group function button asks for how many passengers are going to a floor, and then the system sends the correct number of elevators to that floor if available.

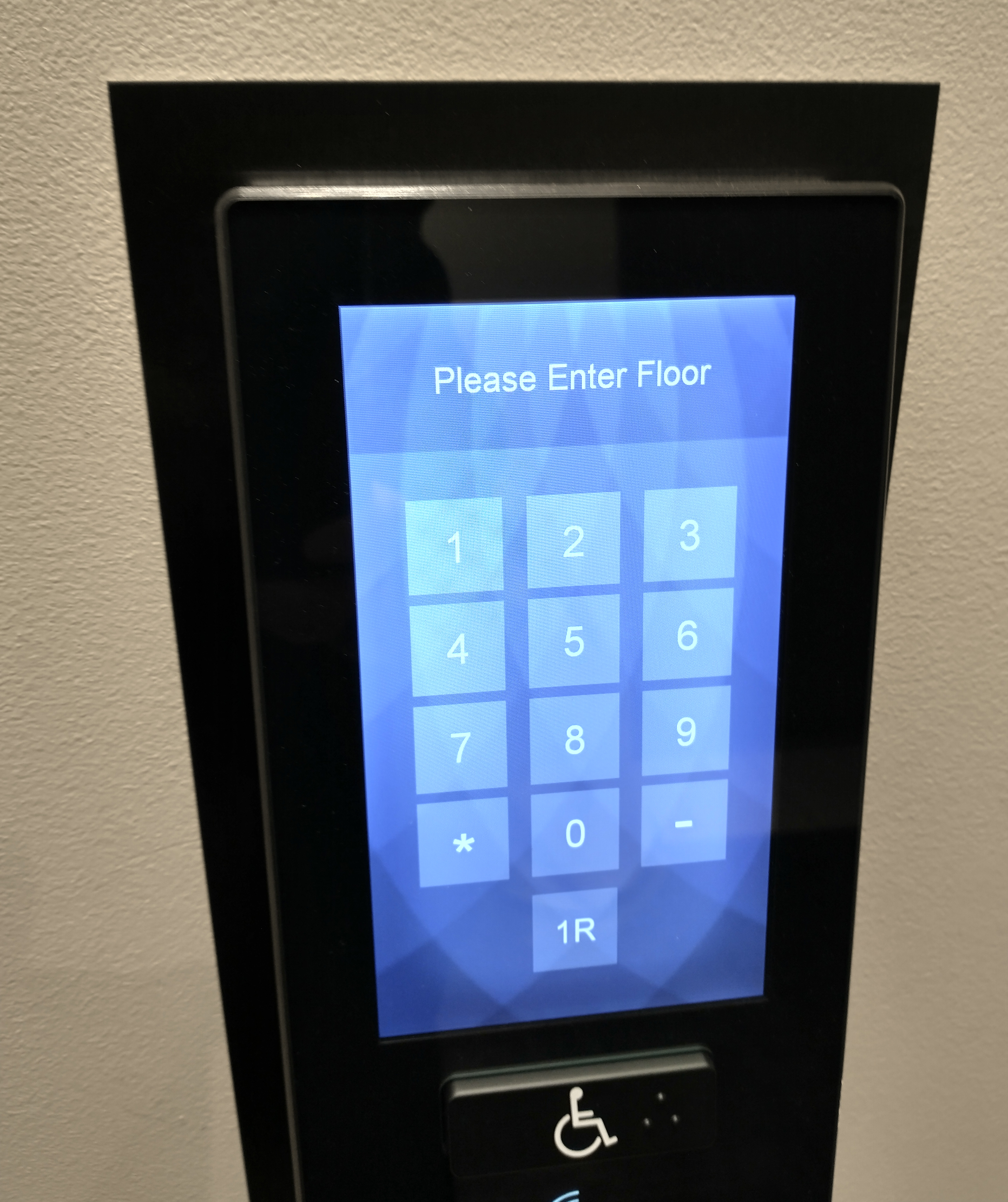
Touchscreen controls installed in 2021 in the 1021 O Street office building in Sacramento, California
