= Hubbard Park (Montpelier, Vermont) =

Park in Montpelier, Vermont, U.S.

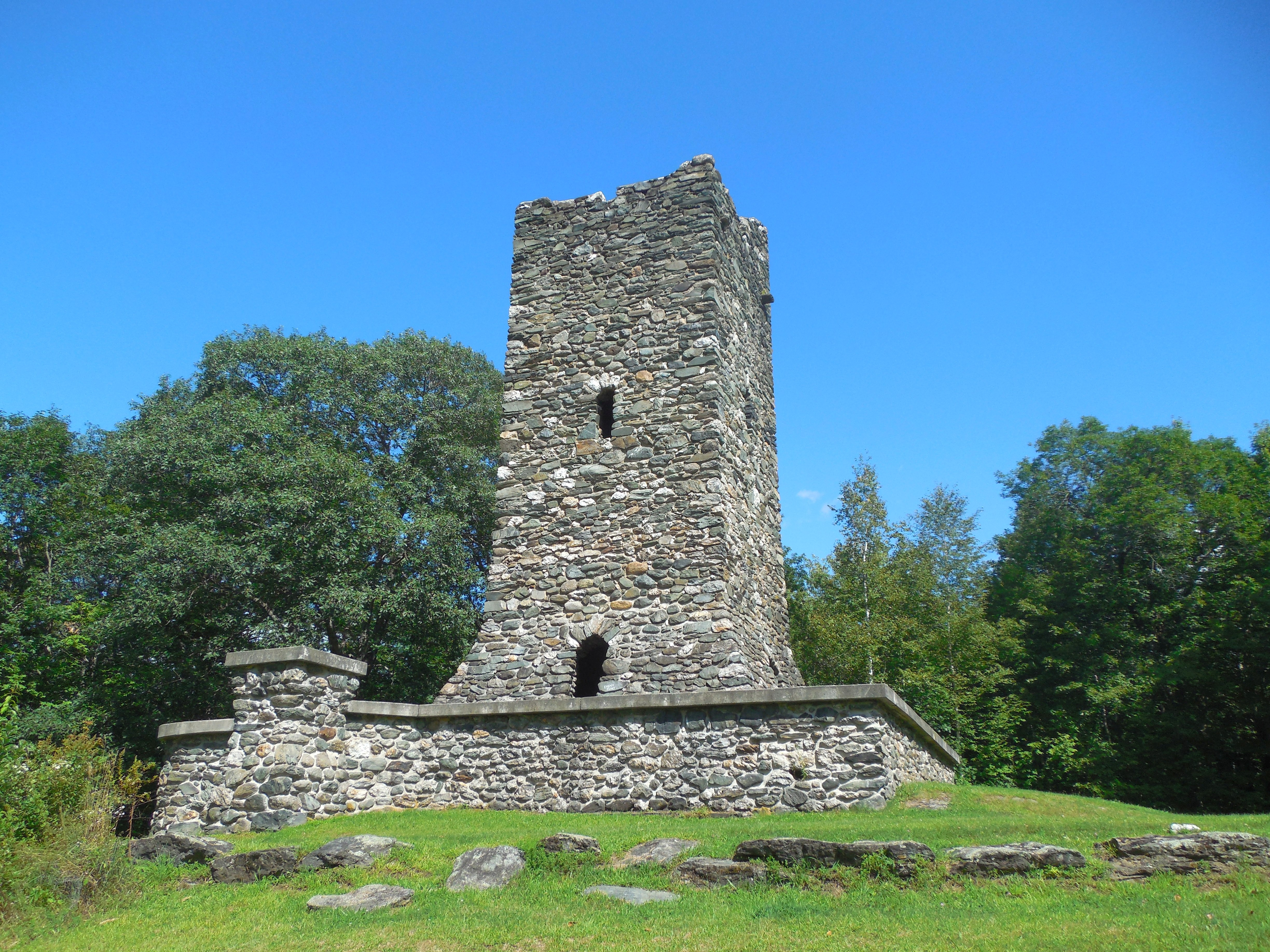
- Hubbard Park Tower
- Interactive map of Hubbard Park
- Location: City of Montpelier, Vermont
- Coordinates: 44°16′16″N 72°34′44″W
- Area: 194 acres (79 ha)
- Created: 1899
- Designer: Park designed by: Dana F. Dow, ASLA, Tower design by: Harry Morton Cutler
- Operator: City of Montpelier, Parks and Trees Department
- Website: Hubbard Park

Hubbard Park is a 194-acre park (79 ha) located to the north of the Vermont State House in Montpelier, Vermont. The park features approximately 7 miles of hiking and skiing trails, a soccer and ball field, picnic areas, a sledding hill, seven fireplaces, two sheltered pavilions, and a historic 54-foot high observation tower that was built between 1915 and 1930. The tower was listed on the Vermont State Historic Register on March 15, 1990, and along with its original parcel area, was added to the National Register of Historic Places as part of a Boundary Increase of the Montpelier Historic District (listed as property #562) on February 20, 2018.

== History ==
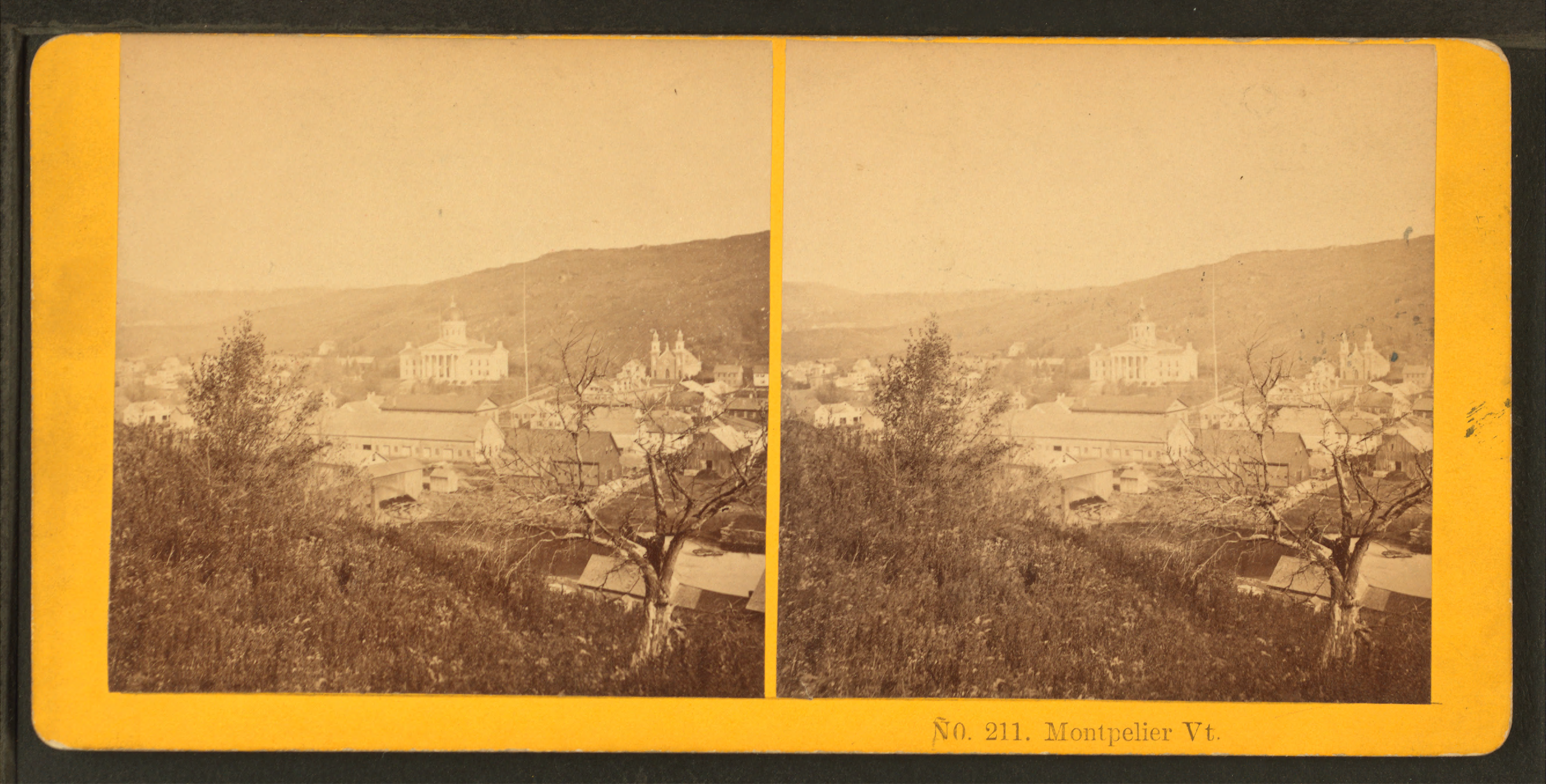
Montpelier, Vermont in the late 1800s showing the bare hillside behind the Vermont State House which will eventually become Hubbard Park.

On August 14, 1781, Montpelier's first settler, Colonel Jacob Davis (1741–1814) from Charlton, Massachusetts, a veteran who had served in the Continental Army, obtained the charter of Montpelier which included the land that is now Hubbard Park. Davis deeded the acreage to his son Thomas, who in 1815, signed the land over to local merchants Capt. Timothy Hubbard and Erastus Hubbard. The land was eventually passed to Erastus' son, John Erastus Hubbard, as part of the entire Hubbard estate.

Hubbard Park was established in 1899 with a donation of 134 acres of land, known as "Hubbard Hill", bequeathed to the City of Montpelier by John Erastus Hubbard (1847–1899) with the intent to "preserve wilderness" for future generations. Prior to the park being established much of its land had been clear-cut to be used as grazing pastures. In response to the request made in Hubbard's will, the City of Montpelier established a Park Commission to plan for the parks future and oversee its use. In 1907, Dana F. Dow was hired by the commission to design the layout of the park. Dow honored Hubbard's request by suggesting an informal use of the land specifically mapping out roads that followed the natural surface as much as possible as well as reforestation of the area. Dow further proposed constructing a road leading hikers to the highest point of the park where he stated an observatory should be built.

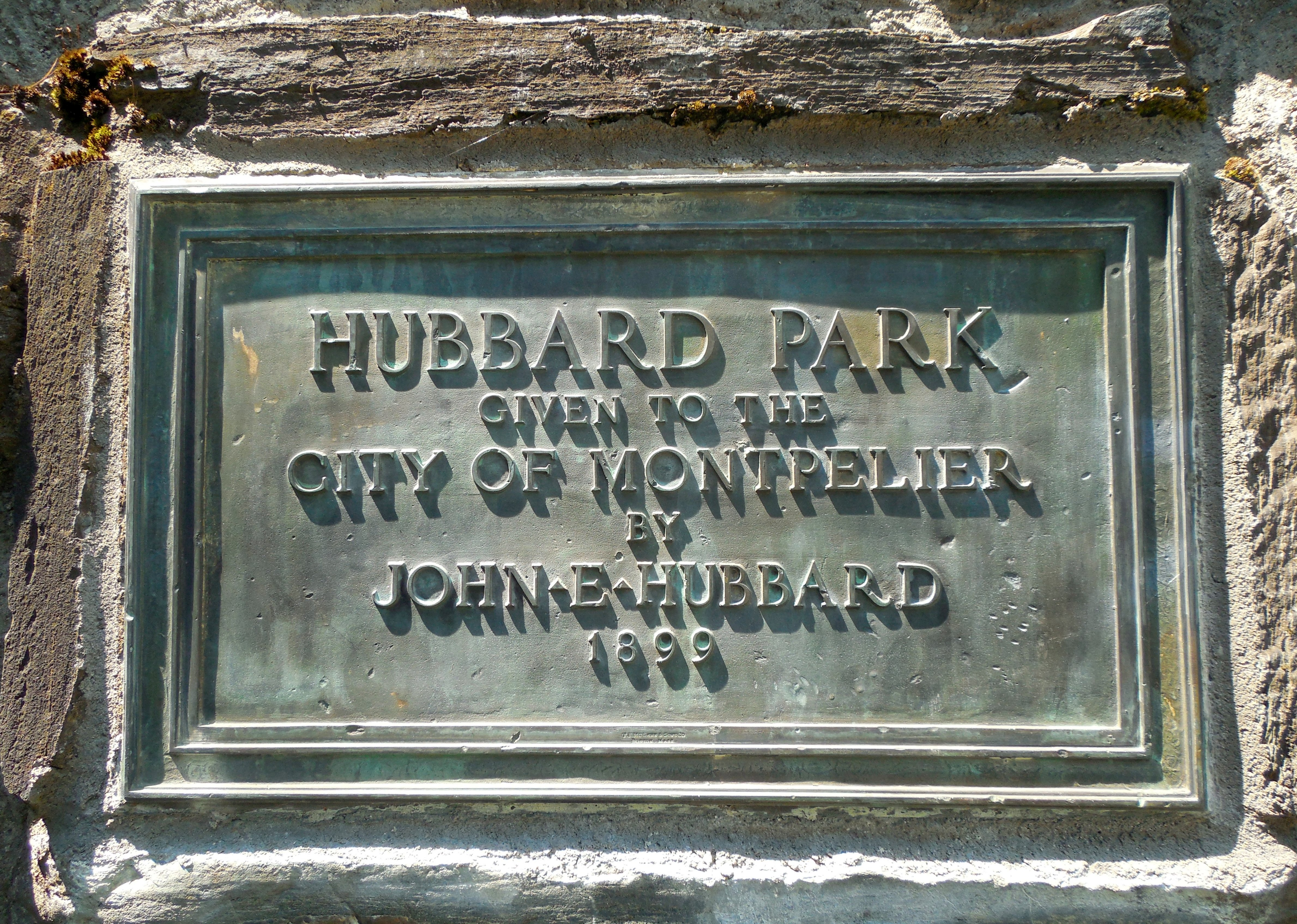
Dedication plaque at the park's eastern entrance drive

The road to the summit was initially constructed in 1910. During the 1920s, extensive plantings of red pines were undertaken along the hillside behind the Vermont Statehouse and below the tower site. By the 1960s, the stands of pines grew to obstruct what had previously been a clear view of the statehouse and downtown Montpelier from the tower (and vice versa). Between 1933 and 1936, as part of the New Deal, the Civilian Conservation Corps under the direction of the Vermont Forest Service materially enhanced much of the park. These enhancements were done carefully so as to not cause any disfigurements to the landscape, "yet improved enough for greater human enjoyment". Designed to make Hubbard Park more usable and beautiful- the upgrades focused on improving infrastructure and planting new trees as well as clearing brush and down material to reduce fire hazards. During this time all of the interior roads were regraded, widened, drained, and graveled. Hubbard Park Drive was improved to allow the park to be readily accessible from either the east or west side of Montpelier. A new bridle trail was constructed which allows visitors to hike the entire park area. 3,000 Norway spruce and 1,000 red pine trees were planted. The park's seven fireplace picnic area and a sledding hill near the parks main entrance were also added. In all twenty acres of woodlands were cleared of brush and down material, seven acres were reforested, and four miles of road was built or improved.

During the late 1960s improvements to the park were made such as the addition of a nature trail by a youth group under the direction of County Forester, Norman Hudson. A grant from the Bureau of Outdoor Recreation allowed for the construction of a shelter, barbeque grills, picnic and parking areas, as well as a recreation field that can be used as a softball or soccer field.

In 1985, a fitness trail was constructed which included various obstacles and equipment for visitors to use.

Additional parcels have since been donated to the park, including 50 acres by William Heney and his family in 1990. Support funding from the Vermont Housing & Conservation Board played a key role in acquiring nine additional acres in 1995. These additions allowed for the expansion of trails to connect Hubbard Park to the Montpelier Recreation Field, North Branch Park as well as the newly built North Branch Nature Center.

=== The Observation Tower ===
In April, 1908 Dana F. Dow presented his ideas for the park layout which included the construction of an observatory tower on a summit. The highest point in the immediate area was Capitol Hill which, at that time, was owned by Jesse S. Viles, former owner of the Pavilion Hotel who approved of the idea of an observatory tower in the park. In 1911, Viles deeded this parcel of land along with "a strip of land three rods wide" to serve as an approach into the park which became Hubbard Park Drive.

Dow's original plan for the tower was to provide fine views of the State House dome and the surrounding area. He planned for the tower to be visible from the downtown streets of Montpelier as to entice visitors to make the hike to the summit. Dow emphasized this point:

As a drawing attraction, it would pay to put up something effective here, and, moreover, it will be a conspicuous object, being visible from a large part of the city. There may be plenty of other views in Montpelier that are just as good as the one from this point, but the majority of people enjoy the novelty of climbing a tower in order to get the view.

The road to the summit was constructed in 1911 and construction of the tower began in 1915. An initial donation of $500 from Mrs. M.J. Dunwoodie allowed for the preparation the foundation. The tower was designed by Park Commissioner and avocational architect, Harry Morton Cutler (1867–1930) who was employed as the treasurer for the National Life Insurance Company of Montpelier. Constructed intermittently for several weeks each year by John Miglierini (1869–1930, who immigrated to Montpelier from Italy in 1893) and his employed crew, the tower's stones were gathered from nearby abandoned walls and fences previously used to mark the hillside when it was used as grazing pastures. To this day visitors can still find lengths of old stone fences throughout the park. The tower was completed in 1930 for a total cost of $8,000 (primarily through provisional funding within the city's budget). The inner terrace was added at a later date. Often mistaken as an unfinished structure, the irregular-shaped parapet along the top of the tower was an intentional design feature crafted to resemble that of a medieval ruin.

In 1990, the tower underwent general refurbishing to maintain its safety and integrity which included the replacement of the 50 year old iron stairwell. During the summer of 2009, the tower was closed for major restoration, where the masonry was re-pointed on the inside and outside, and the metal stairway was sandblasted and repainted with rust-resistant paint.

== Park Features ==
=== Old Shelter Pavilion ===
Located near the park's main entrance on top of a large grassy hill is the Old Shelter Pavilion which provides a beautiful view of the surrounding hills. Adjacent to the shelter is a soccer or softball field as well as a small parking area. During the winter months the Old Shelter hill is a popular sledding spot. The Old Shelter Pavilion is equipped with barbecue grills, picnic tables, a drinking fountain and a composting toilet.

=== New Shelter Pavilion ===
In an attempt to make Hubbard Park more accessible, the New Shelter Pavilion was built to be handicap friendly. The surrounding area includes a grassy lawn great for games, picnic tables, a small parking area, barbecue grills, a water fountain, and a composting toilet.

=== Seven Fireplaces ===
Near the center of Hubbard Park are the park's Seven Fireplaces. This barbecue/ picnic area features fireplaces and grills for campfires and outdoor cooking. Leading away from the Seven Fireplaces are trails to the North Branch Nature Center and to Hubbard Park's Fitness Trails. As of June, 2022, the seven fireplaces have fallen into disrepair and only three of the original seven fireplaces still exist today.

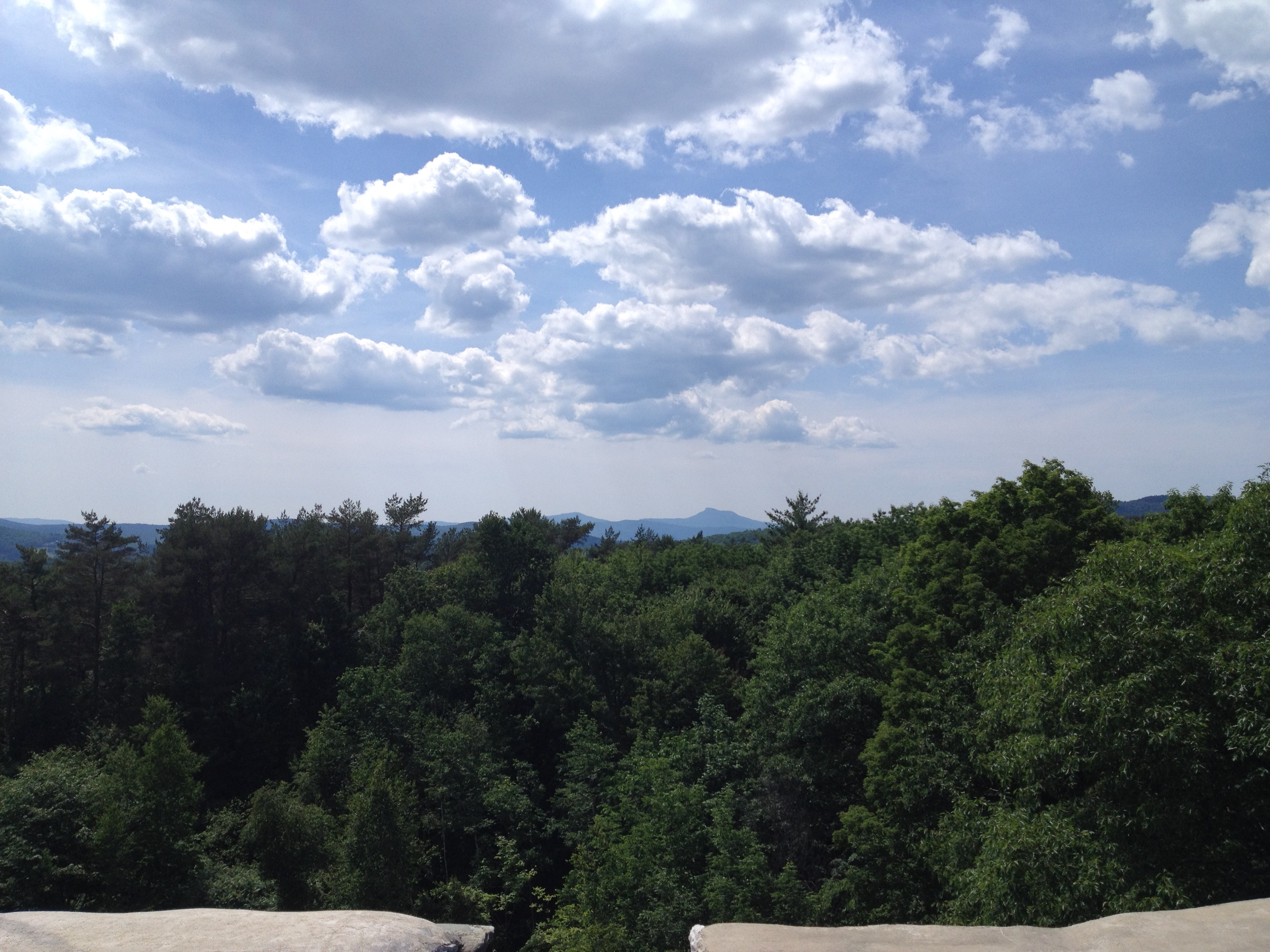
View of Camel's Hump from the top of the Hubbard Park Tower.

=== Tower ===
Located at the highest point of the park, the 52-foot tower offers a beautiful view of surrounding mountains. While much of downtown Montpelier became obstructed from view by maturing stands of red pines during the 1960s, several mountain ranges may nevertheless be seen from the top of the tower. The base of the tower features picnic tables and benches as well as a large grassy field. Surrounding the tower are fruit and nut trees planted to attract wildlife to the area.

The tower was constructed upon a concrete slab extending beyond its base, which serves as a three foot wide terrace around its perimeter. It is enclosed by a 21" high rubble wall with 8" epoxy/cement caps. Two 30" piers rise on the eastern and western terrace walls that define the formal entry in plane. The tower walls at its base are 5' thick, which narrow down to a 30" thickness as the tower extends upward toward the observation deck floor. The sections of the walls are 24" thick along the parapet. The height of the wall ranges from about 3' to 4' high above the observation deck, except along the southeastern corner where the parapet stands approximately 8' high. A stone seat was built into this corner of the wall upon the observation deck.

=== Pond ===
Hubbard Park also features a small man-made pond near the main entrance.

=== Trails ===
Hubbard Park is home to extensive trails that are great for walking, hiking, jogging, and running. These trails double as cross-country ski and snowshoe trails during the winter months. Approximately 7 miles of hiking and skiing trails are scattered throughout the park.

== Events and Activities ==
The annual community-arts based All Species Day Parade spring celebration has traditionally gathered at the soccer field in Hubbard Park at noon on the first Sunday of each May since 1989. At 1:00pm the procession begins from the Winter Street park entrance and continues to the State House.

Starting in the summer of 2018, the annual Parkapalooza music festival series was held on the third Saturday of each month from June through September.
