= Governor of Vermont =

Head of state and of government of the U.S. state of Vermont

- Arms of the State of Vermont

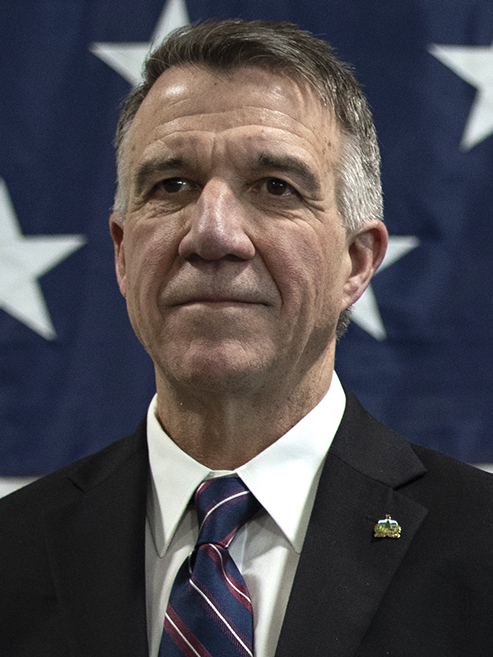
- Incumbent; Phil Scott since January 5, 2017
- Government of Vermont
- Status: Head of state Head of government
- Residence: None official
- Seat: State House (Ceremonial office); The Pavilion (Working office)
- Nominator: Political parties
- Appointer: Majority vote
- Term length: Two years, no term limits
- Constituting instrument: Constitution of Vermont
- Precursor: Governor of the Vermont Republic
- Inaugural holder: Thomas Chittenden
- Succession: Line of succession
- Deputy: Lieutenant Governor of Vermont
- Salary: $142,542 (2013)
- Website: Official website

The governor of Vermont is the head of government of the U.S. state of Vermont. The officeholder is elected in even-numbered years by direct voting for a term of two years. Vermont and bordering New Hampshire are the only states to hold gubernatorial elections every two years, instead of every four as in the other 48 U.S. states.

There is no limit on the number of terms a Vermont governor can serve. If no candidate receives at least 50% plus one vote of all votes for governor cast in the election, the governor of Vermont is then elected by the state legislature. The incumbent Vermont governor is Republican Phil Scott. He was sworn in on January 5, 2017, becoming Vermont's 82nd governor.

Despite having a Republican governor, Vermont has the most Democratic Cook Partisan Voting Index of any of the 50 U.S. states, at D+17.

== Function ==
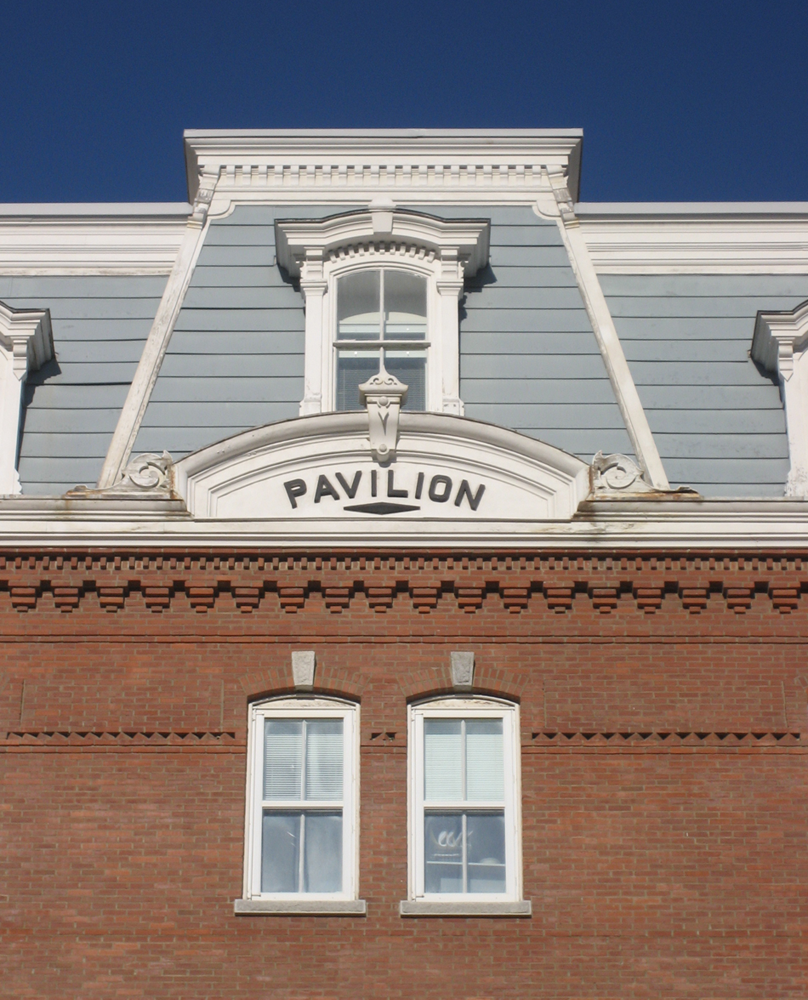
Detail of The Pavilion in Montpelier, location of the governor of Vermont's working offices

The governor's working offices are located in The Pavilion in the state capital of Montpelier, Vermont. The Governor's ceremonial office, used during the legislative session of the General Assembly, is located in the Vermont State House, also in Montpelier.

The Constitution of Vermont details the powers of the governor:

- To commission or appoint all officers ("except where provision is, or shall be, otherwise made by law or this Frame of Government")
- To fill all vacancies in office until the office can be filled in the manner directed by state constitution or by state law
- To correspond with other States
- To "transact business with officers of government, civil and military"
- To "prepare such business as may appear necessary, to lay before the General Assembly.
- To grant pardons and remit fines, except for cases of treason, in which the governor may only grant reprieves until the end of the next session of the General Assembly, and for cases of impeachment, in which the governor cannot grant either reprieves or pardons
- To "take care that the laws be faithfully executed" and "expedite the execution of such measures as may be resolved upon by the General Assembly"
- To "draw upon the Treasury for such sums as may be appropriated by the General Assembly"
- To "lay embargoes, or prohibit the exportation of any commodity" for up to 30 days during a recess of the General Assembly
- To "grant such licenses as shall be directed by law"
- To call special sessions of the General Assembly when necessary
- To be the "Captain-General and Commander-in-Chief" of the "forces of the State" (the Vermont State Guard and Vermont National Guard), although the governor cannot "command in person, in time of war, or insurrection, unless by the advice and consent of the Senate, and no longer than they shall approve thereof"

The lieutenant governor of Vermont is elected separately from the governor. If the incumbent governor dies, resigns or is removed from office via impeachment, then the lieutenant governor becomes governor. The lieutenant governor is also the lieutenant general "forces of the State".

== Timeline ==
Timeline of Vermont governors

== See also ==
- List of governors of Vermont
