= Pavilion Hotel =

The Pavilion Hotel may refer to:

- The Pavilion (Vermont)
- Pavilion Hotel (Nebraska), listed on the National Register of Historic Places
