= Montpelier Historic District (Vermont) =

Historic district in Vermont, United States

- U.S. National Register of Historic Places
- U.S. Historic district
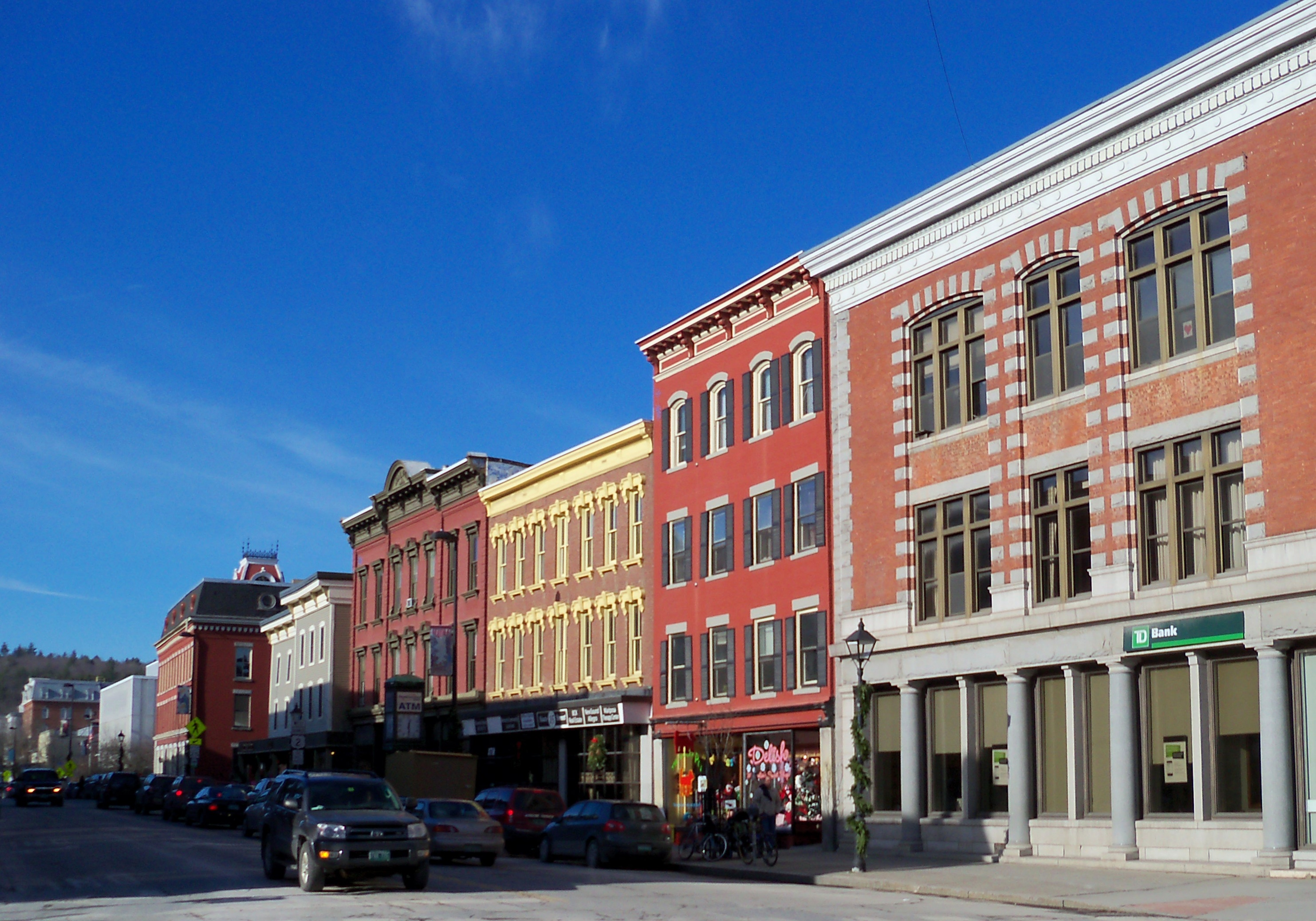
- State Street view

- Location within Vermont Location within the United States
- Location: U.S. 2 and VT 12, Montpelier, Vermont
- Coordinates: 44°15′41″N 72°34′37″W
- Area: 237 acres (96 ha) (original size); 7.5 acres (3.0 ha) (size of 1989 increase)
- Built: 1805
- Architectural style: Mixed (more Than 2 Styles From Different Periods), Federal
- NRHP reference No.: 78000246 (original); 89000248 (increase 1); 100002105 (increase 2)

Significant dates
- Added to NRHP: November 3, 1978
- Boundary increases: April 17, 1989; February 20, 2018

The Montpelier Historic District encompasses much of the historic commercial and government district of Montpelier, the state capital of Vermont. The city center, focused on the confluence of the Winooski River with its North Branch, has been economically driven by state government since 1805, and had industry powered by the rivers. Its center reflects a diversity of 19th century architecture. In addition to the Vermont State House, the district includes The Pavilion, the commercial downtown area, and residential areas to the east and north. It was listed on the National Register of Historic Places in 1978, and enlarged in 1989 and 2018.

== Description and history ==
Montpelier was chartered in 1781, and was a sleepy rural community when it was named the state capital in 1805, primarily for its geographically central location and access to road and waterways. This inaugurated a development boom, with State Street forming an important axis between the state complex and the town center. The town was named the county seat of what is now Washington County in 1811. Industrial development was enhanced by the arrival of the railroad in 1849, and the town's economy boomed after the American Civil War. It was reincorporated as a city in 1895. Growth slowed after World War I, with the rise of the automobile and increasing suburbanization.

The historic district is defined in large part by its two principal waterways. The North Branch flows south into the west-flowing Winooski River, with the central business district mainly northeast of their confluence. Major roadways parallel these two rivers, with State Street running west to the state capitol, and Barre and Berlin Streets running east. Main Street runs north–south to a branching point with Elm Street, where it turns east, constrained by the steep contours of the surrounding hills. The central business district is largely characterized by brick buildings built after two fires swept the area in 1875.

== See also ==
- National Register of Historic Places listings in Washington County, Vermont
