= Montpelier Bridge =

Newspaper in Montpelier, Vermont, US

- Type: Semi-monthly
- Owner: Capital Region Community Media
- Editor: Cassandra Hemenway
- Founded: 1993
- Headquarters: Montpelier, Vermont
- Circulation: 10,000
- Website: https://www.thebridgevt.org/

The Bridge, formerly the Montpelier Bridge, is a semi-monthly paper covering the communities of central Vermont, including Montpelier, the state capital, as well as Barre, Berlin, Middlesex, East Montpelier, Calais, Plainfield, Marshfield, Worcester, and other towns.

== History ==
The paper was founded in 1993 by Jake Brown, Phil Dodd, Nat Frothingham, and numerous volunteers including consultation by Daniel A. Neary, Jr. as the Vermont state nonprofit Montpelier Community Newspaper Association, Inc. It later transitioned to a private business, co-owned by Jake Brown and Nat Frothingham. Brown left the paper in 2004 and returned as a board member in 2026. In 2018, Mike Dunphy replaced Frothingham as editor-in-chief. Mara Brooks replaced Dunphy in early 2020, but left in May 2020 to be replaced by former managing editor Carla (Neary) Occaso. In 2021 Cassandra Hemenway came on board as the Editor-in-Chief and led The Bridge through its transition to become a 501(c)3 nonprofit newsroom, a more governance-based board of directors, and a significant increase in individual donations and grants. Under Hemenway's leadership The Bridge expanded its coverage more significantly beyond Montpelier, and participated in both formal and informal collaborations with other news organizations around the state, sharing stories and approaches to surviving and thriving in a world in which media outlets regularly go out of business.

The paper nearly folded after the Great Recession of 2008. In 2015, Publisher Nat Frothingham, Managing Editor Carla Occaso, Designer Marichel Vaught, and Ad Sales Rep Michael Jermyn petitioned to get The Bridge on the City ballot in order to get appropriation of Montpelier city funds to keep the paper afloat, but City Council voted it down. So they embarked on a Kickstarter campaign to raise enough money to pay off back printing bills and unpaid employee bills dating back to the 2009 economic downturn. Frothingham also asked readers to contribute funds, including Montpelier Mayor John Hollar, who donated, calling the paper a "labor of love."

The City of Montpelier did enter into an exchange with The Bridge as a paid advertiser, and paid an annual fee in exchange for ad space featuring a monthly column by the City Manager, clearly marked as a paid advertisement. In 2024, budget cuts necessitated the city end its monthly paid column, and payments to The Bridge ceased, other than for occasional smaller ads.

In 2016 the paper transitioned back into a statewide not-for-profit paper, but it would be another seven years with the efforts of then Operations Manager Sharon Allen before The Bridge achieved federal nonprofit status. The 2020 pandemic caused a shakeup, in which two key employees left, but veteran Bridge board members and former employees stepped in to cover the COVID-19 pandemic, anti-racism resurgence, a new police chief, new restaurants, and other issues concerning Montpelier, Vt. with renewed vigor. By 2021, The Bridge hired Cassandra Hemenway to take the helm, and has since won a Vermont Civics Journalism Award in 2025, and Hemenway serves as a board member for the Vermont Journalism Coalition.

The paper was commended by the Vermont Senate in 2014 and by the Vermont House of Representatives in 2018.

The Bridge publishes twice monthly in print, and runs a robust website, thebridgevt.org, in which it features the stories that ran in print in addition to regularly published stories that appear in digital form only.
