= Montpelier, Vermont =

Capital city of Vermont, United States

Montpelier
- State capital city
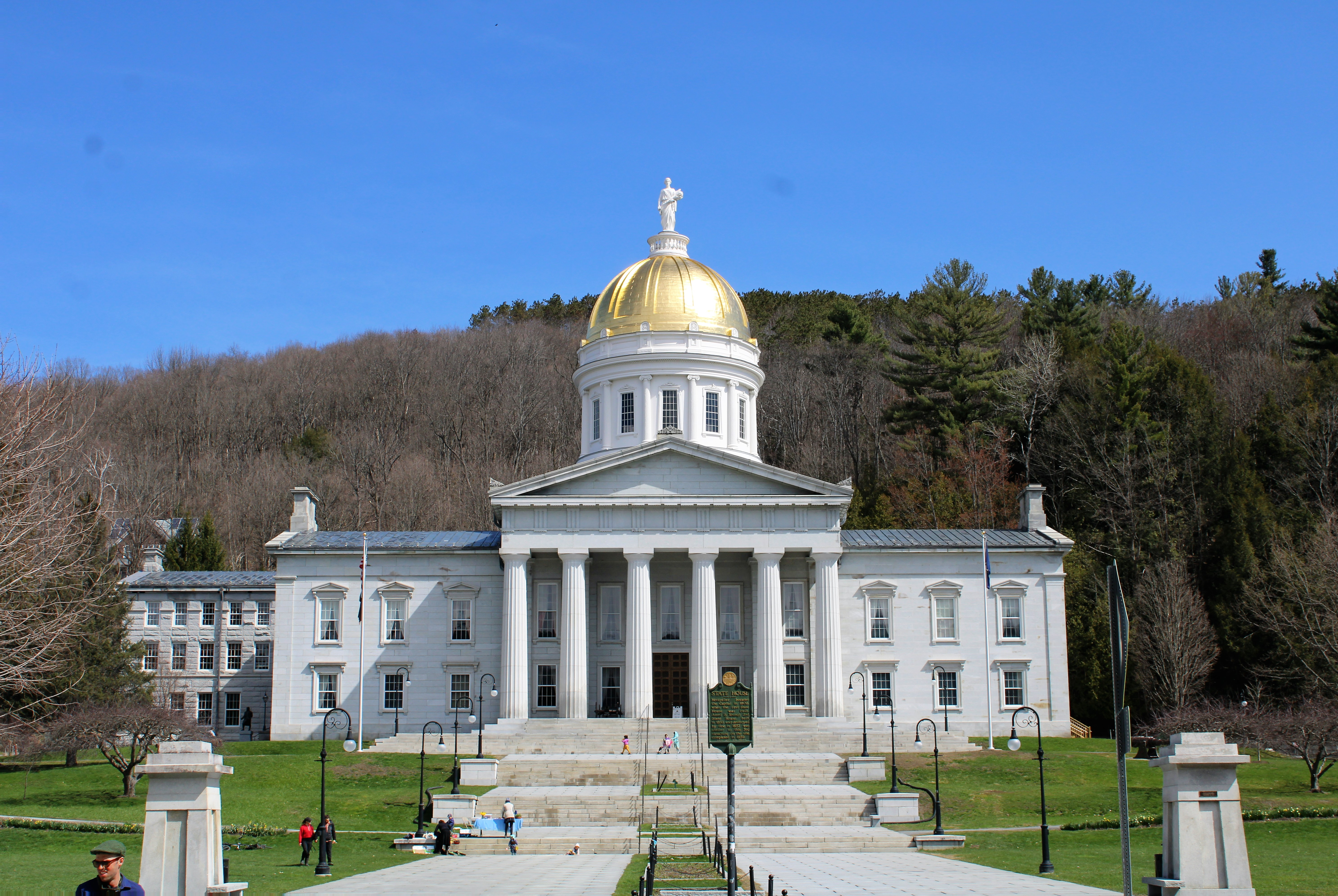
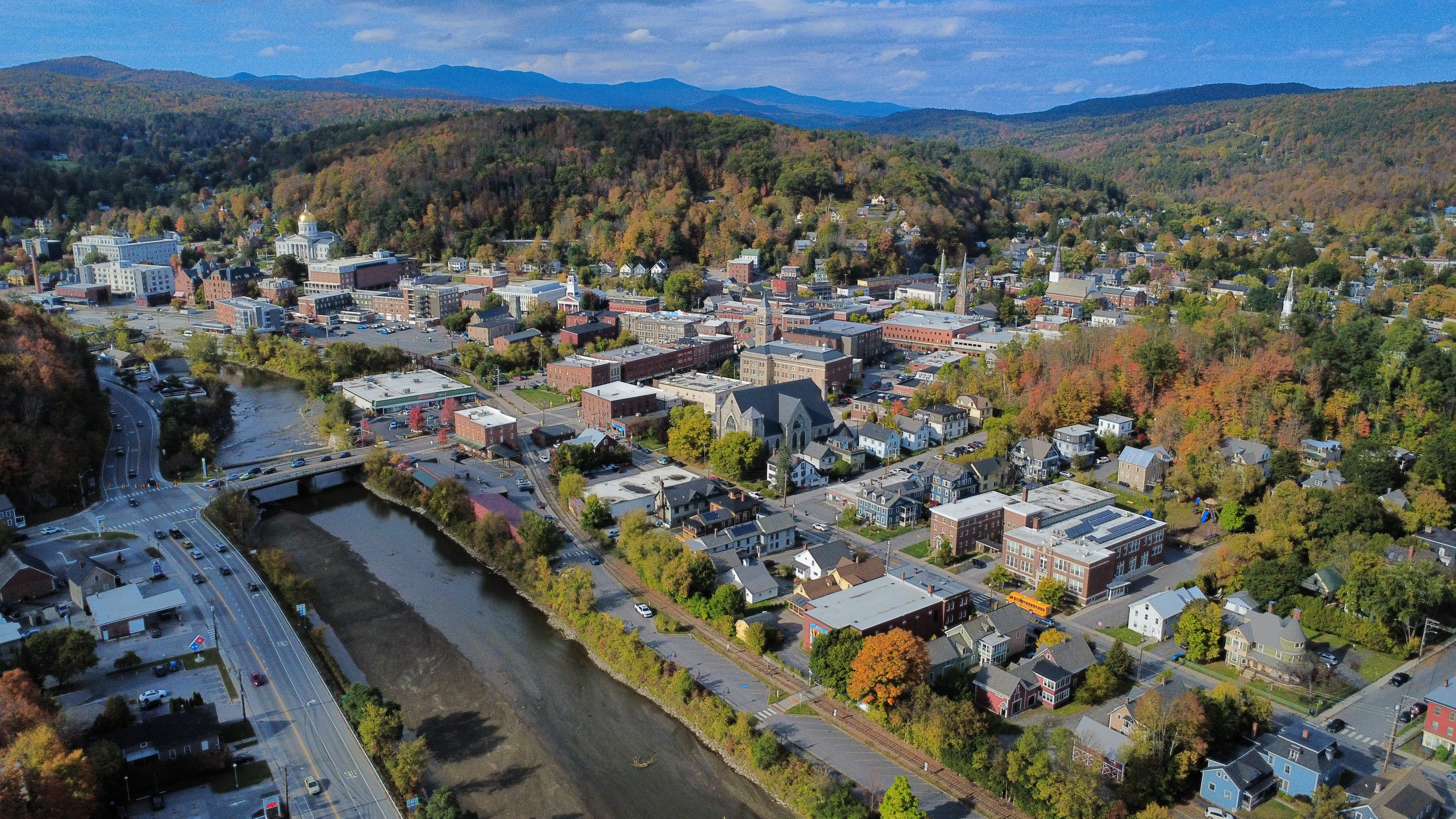
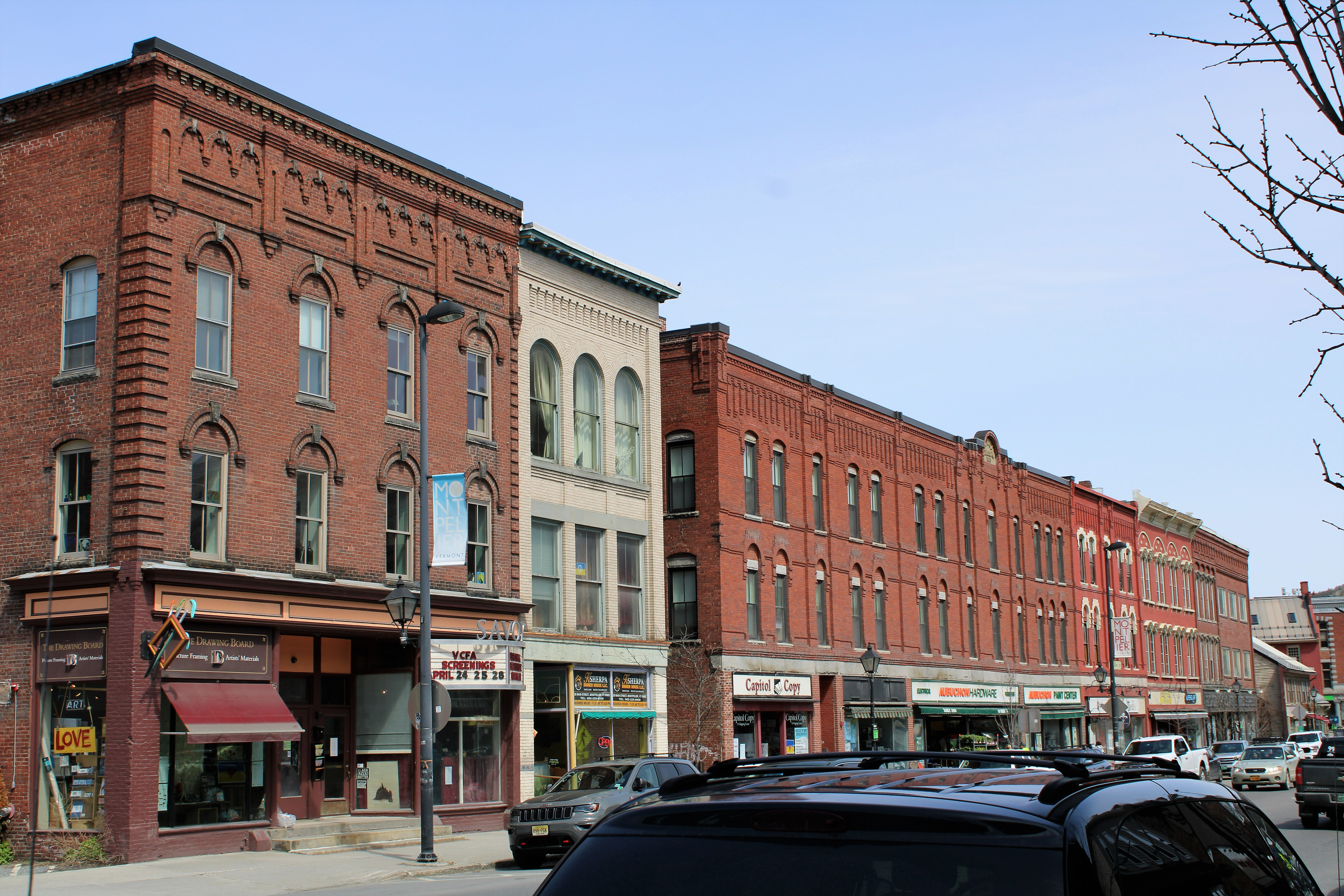
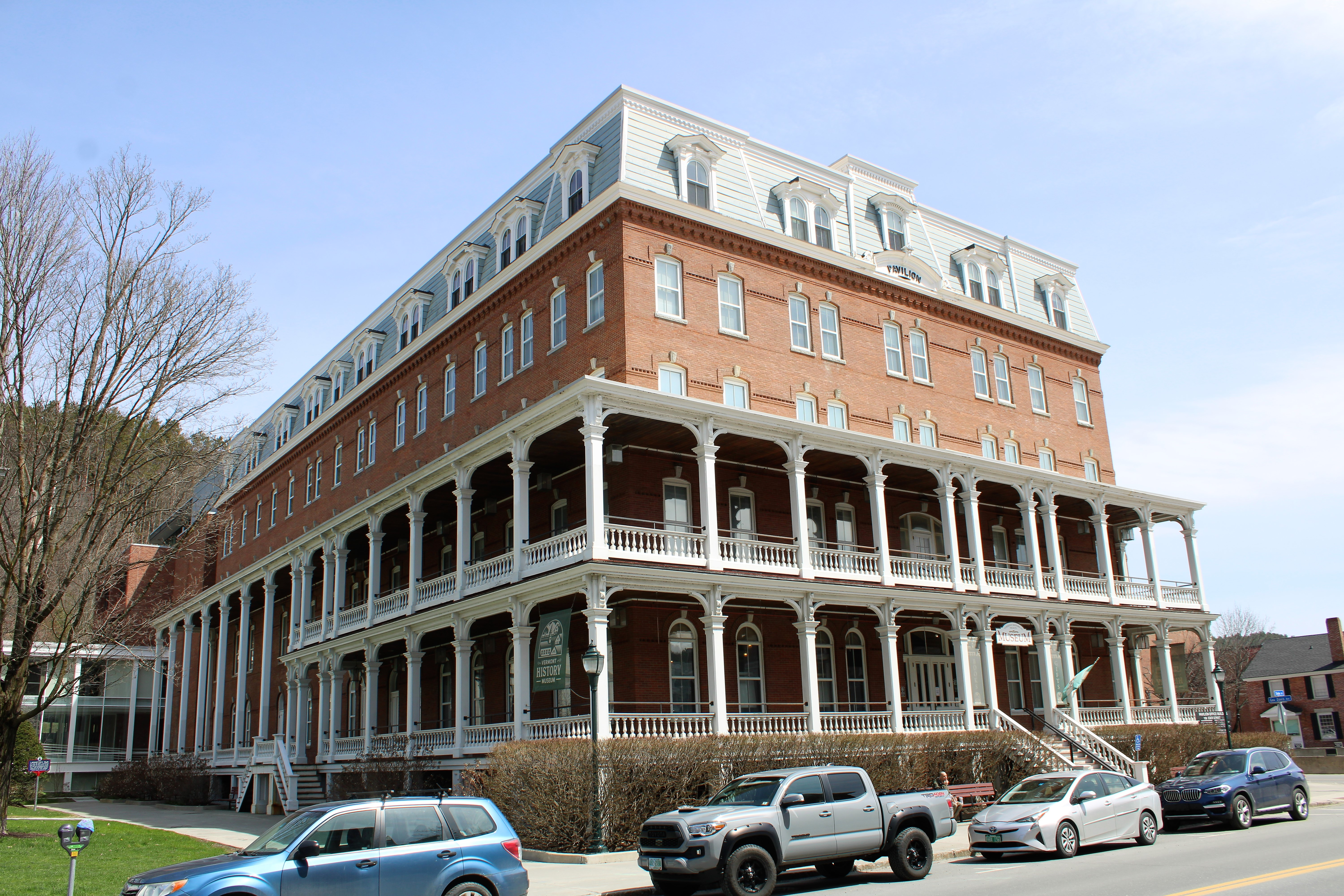
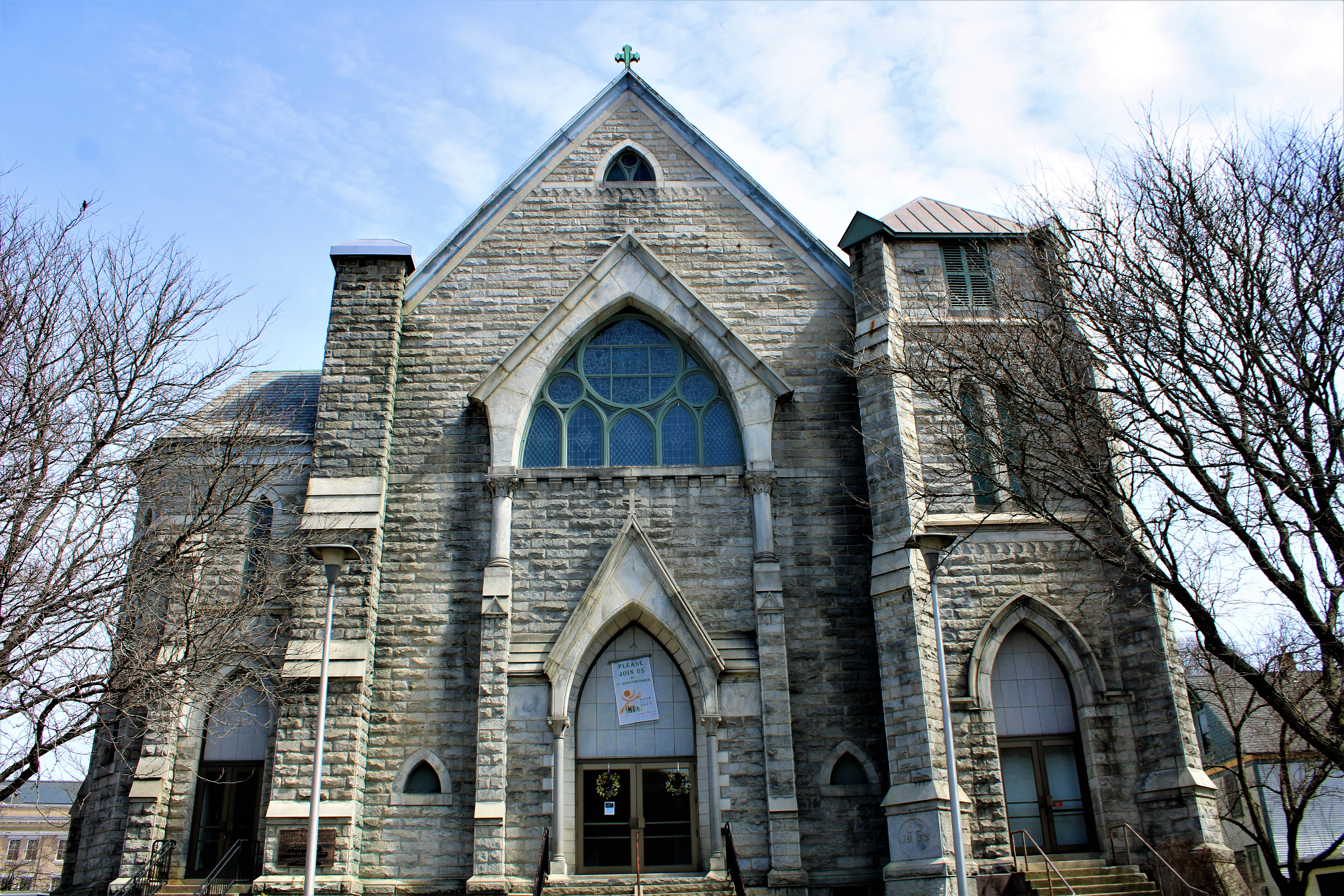
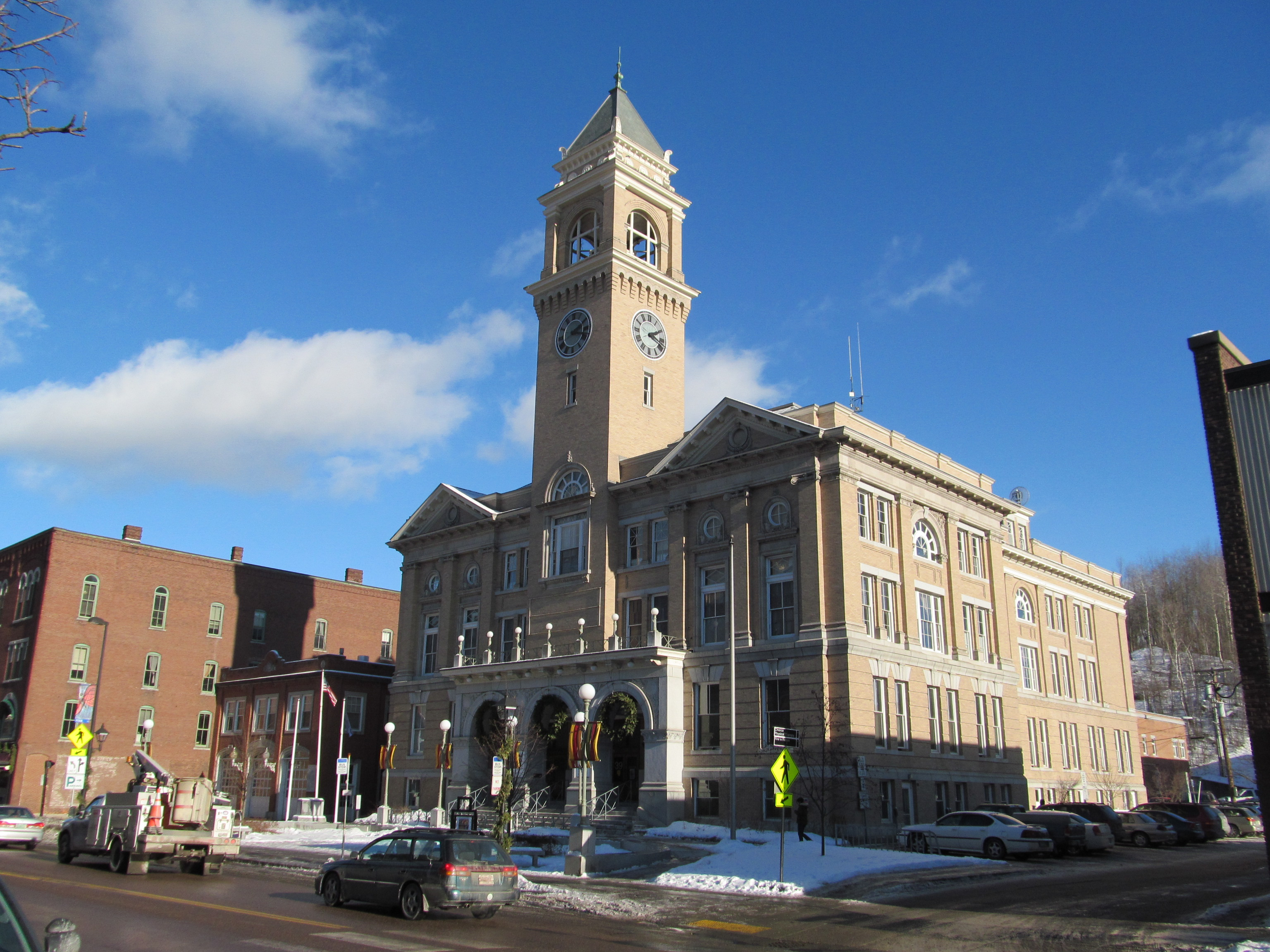
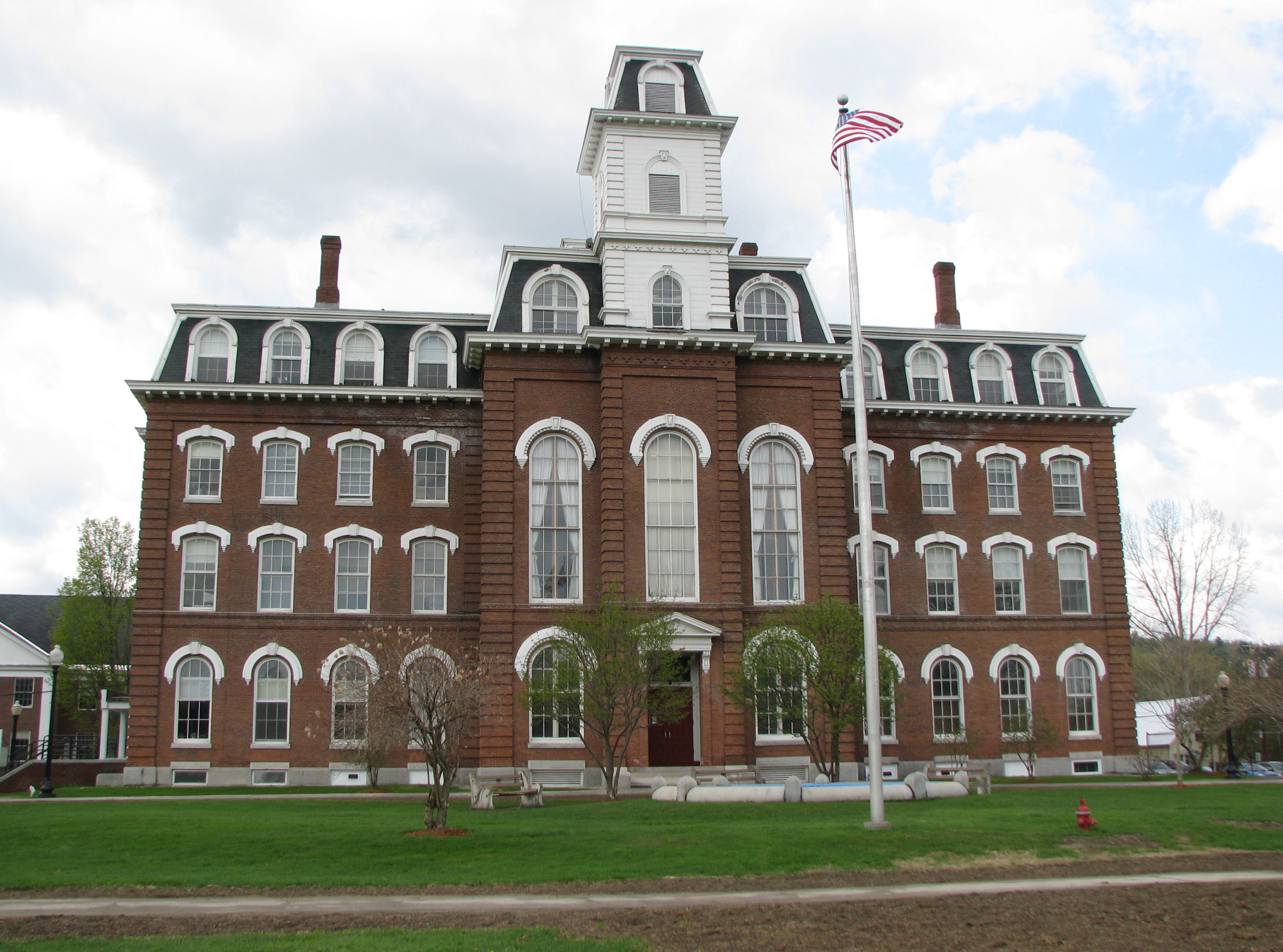
- Vermont State House View from the southeast Main Street The Pavilion Saint Augustine Church City Hall College Hall

- Flag Seal

- Location in Washington County & the state of Vermont
- Coordinates: 44°15′35″N 72°33′53″W
- Country: United States
- State: Vermont
- County: Washington
- District: VT-AL
- Settled: 1787
- Incorporated (village): 1818
- Incorporated (city): 1895
- Named for: Montpellier, France

Government
  - Mayor: Marc Gwinn
  - City Manager: Kelly McNicholas Kury

Area
  - Total: 10.25 sq mi (26.54 km^{2})
  - Land: 10.05 sq mi (26.04 km^{2})
  - Water: 0.19 sq mi (0.50 km^{2})
- Elevation: 528 ft (161 m)

Population (2020)
  - Total: 8,074
  - Density: 803.1/sq mi (310.1/km^{2})
- Demonym: Montpelierite
- Time zone: UTC−05:00 (EST)
  - Summer (DST): UTC−04:00 (EDT)
- ZIP codes: 05601-05604, 05609, 05620, 05633
- Area code: 802
- FIPS code: 50-46000
- GNIS feature ID: 1462152
- Website: montpelier-vt.org

Montpelier (/mɒntˈpiːljər/ mont-PEEL-yər) is the capital city of the U.S. state of Vermont and the county seat of Washington County. The site of Vermont's state government, it is the least populous state capital in the United States. As of the 2020 census, the population was 8,074, with a daytime population growth of about 21,000 due to the large number of jobs within city limits. The Vermont College of Fine Arts is located in the municipality. It was named after Montpellier, a city in the south of France.

Montpelier was chartered as a town by proprietors from Massachusetts and western Vermont on August 14, 1781, and the Town of Montpelier was granted municipal powers by the "Governor, Council and General Assembly of the Freemen of the State of Vermont". The first permanent settlement began in May 1787, and a town meeting was established in 1791. The city received a French name because the Franco-American alliance during the Revolutionary War had inspired widespread Francophilia. Montpelier was selected as state capital in 1805, and citizens of the town donated funds to build the first state house. The legislature chartered the City of Montpelier in 1894, and it was organized at a town meeting the next year.

Montpelier is in the north-central area of the state. The Winooski River flows by the south side of the city, passing near the state house and continuing northwest into Chittenden County. The North Branch River, a tributary of the Winooski, also flows through the city. Montpelier's geography leaves it vulnerable to flooding, with three serious floods occurring in 1927, 1992, and 2023. In 1875, fires destroyed 38 buildings in the city, and the commercial area was rebuilt with brick to avoid a repeat of the disaster. The state government contributes to the city's economy, which also relies on insurance and tourism. The insurance industry in Montpelier dates back to the early 19th century. Historically, tradesmen shops and mills along the North Branch also fueled the economy, and sheds for finishing granite from Barre operated along the Winooski. Multiple Ski areas are also located near the city, like Bolton Valley Resort and Sugar Bush Resort.

Travelers can reach the city via the Amtrak Montpelier station, which is located 2 miles west of the downtown area and offers regular service on the Vermonter train. Private planes can also use the nearby Edward F. Knapp State Airport in Berlin, Vermont, but the closest commercial air service is via the Patrick Leahy Burlington International Airport 35 miles (56 km) to the northwest.

== History ==
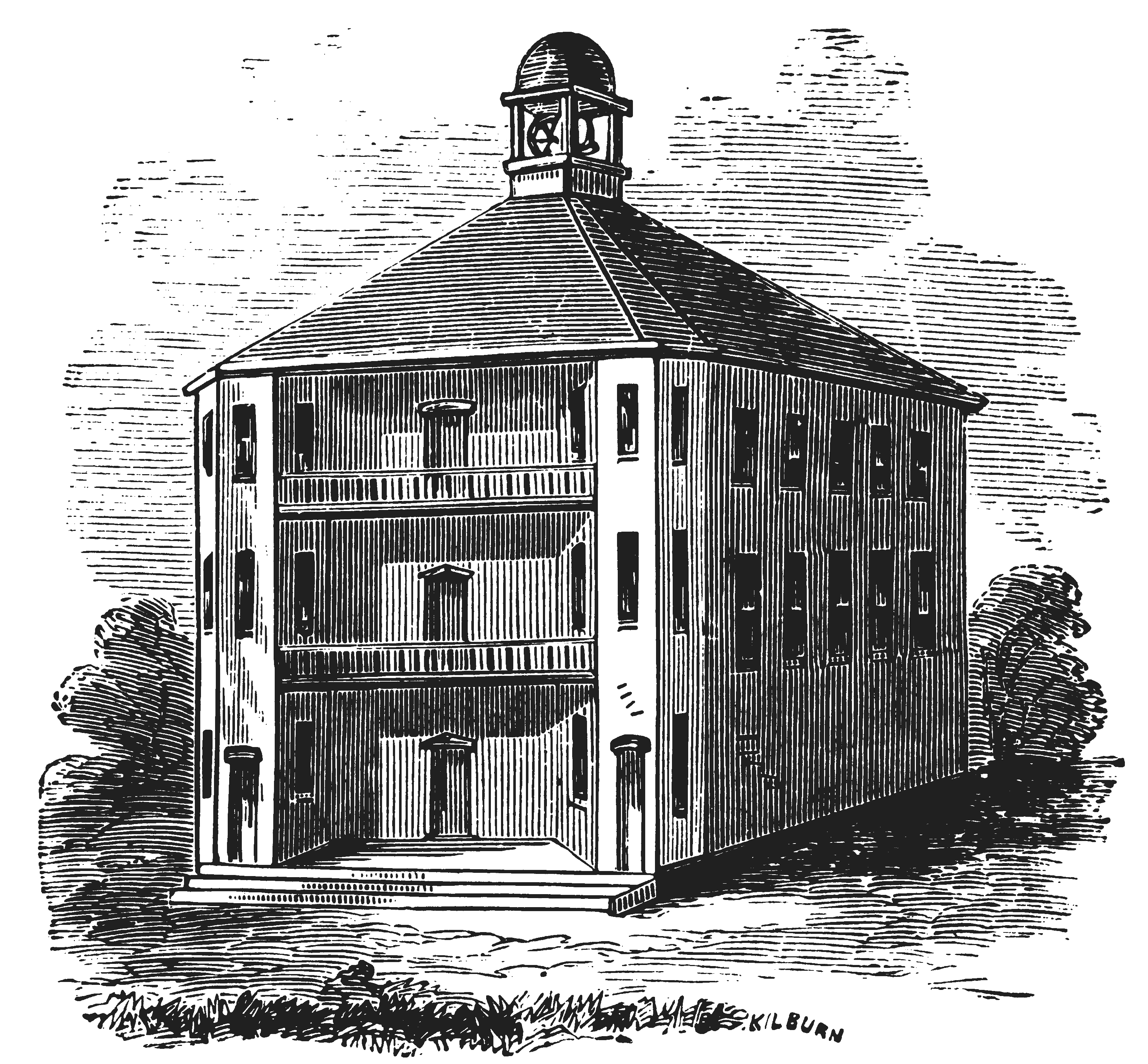
The first Vermont State House, built in 1808, was designed by Sylvanus Baldwin.

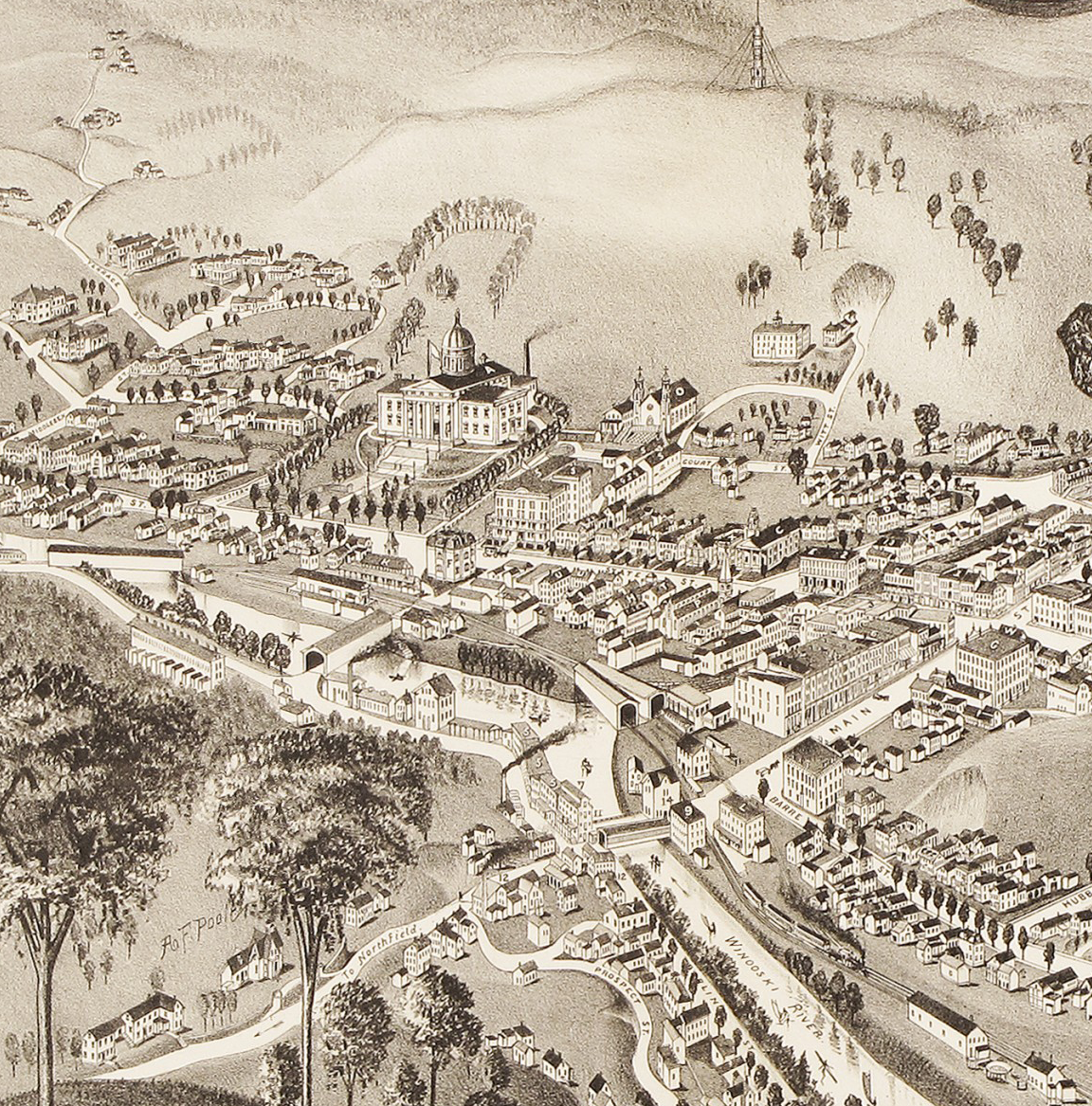
Montpelier as illustrated in 1884

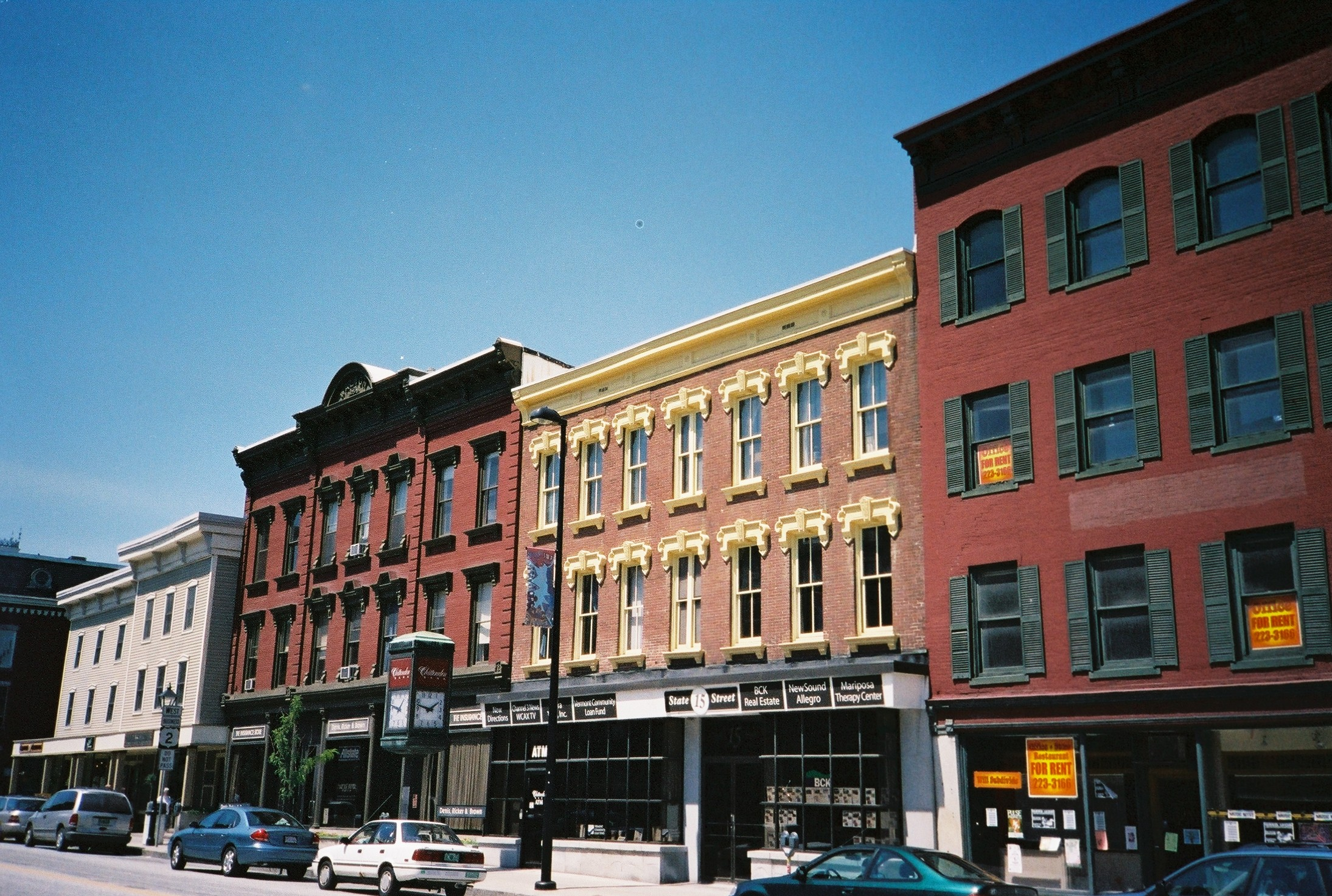
State Street, Montpelier Historic District, 2006

The meadows and flats of the Winooski River were well known among natives for their corn-raising capacities. The natural site of Montpelier made it a favorite residence for the natives who first inhabited the land. The level plain of nearly two hundred acres of the rich farmland, sheltered from winds by the surrounding valley made the area comparatively warm and comfortable. Its position near the confluence of many streams allowed for favorable hunting, fishing, and trading. Native mounds, tombstones, and other memorials of aboriginal life and death were found in Montpelier, or in the vicinity, by the first settlers, and traces of some of them still remain.

Between 1600 and 1800, European settlers began to arrive in the region. Soon after, war, disease, and dispersal virtually destroyed the Native American settlements. However, evidence suggests some Native Americans remained in the area as late as the mid-1800s.

Originally chartered on August 14, 1781, the Town of Montpelier was granted municipal powers by the "Governor, Council and General Assembly of the Freemen of the State of Vermont". The first permanent settlement began in May 1787, when Colonel Jacob Davis and General Parley Davis arrived from Charlton, Massachusetts. General Davis surveyed the land, while Colonel Davis cleared forest and erected a large log house on the west side of the North Branch of the Winooski River. His family moved in the following winter.

Colonel Davis selected the name "Montpelier" after the French city of Montpellier, capital of the department of Hérault. There was a general enthusiasm for things French as a result of the country's aid to the American colonies during the Revolutionary War. The settlement grew quickly, and by 1791 the population reached 117.

The configuration of the early village was strongly influenced by geography. As early as 1799 a bridge was constructed across the Winooski River to Berlin.

The Town's Charter was reissued on February 6, 1804, to include a boundary description of the lands granted to the Town's inhabitants and proprietors. The confluence of the Winooski, North Branch and Dog Rivers provided a central point for the local population and commerce.

By 1805, the town had a population of 1,200. In that year, the state legislature sought a permanent home. Montpelier was selected because of its central location and accessibility, and because local residents provided land and money. A humble State House was soon constructed on State Street.

In 1825, the Marquis de Lafayette visited Montpelier on a triumphal tour of the United States, 50 years after the Revolutionary War.

The town developed into a center for manufacturing, especially after the Central Vermont Railway opened in Montpelier on June 20, 1849. In response to Montpelier's growth and changing demographics, on November 9, 1848, the General Assembly divided the original Town into two district municipal corporations. The towns of East Montpelier and Montpelier were created. Later, in an attempt to modernize its form of government, the town was reconstituted as the Village of Montpelier.

By 1858, the layout of the main streets paralleling the rivers was in place. The downtown street pattern has changed little since that time.

Ten thousand people turned out to greet Major General Philip Sheridan in 1867 when he visited to address the fourth annual meeting of Vermont former Union officers. He particularly thanked Vermont veterans of the Civil War for their performance at the Battle of Cedar Creek.

In 1875, a large fire destroyed many downtown buildings.

The village had the first municipal water driven hydro system in Vermont in 1884. Water pressure generated sufficient electricity for streetlights.

The first charter of Montpelier was granted in 1894 and was amended shortly thereafter in 1898, and again in 1900 and 1912. The first amendment permitted the city to annex a part of the Town of Berlin; the latter enactments amended the 1898 charter to deal with such matters as water works, the relationship between the city and the Washington County Grammar School, and composition of the City Council.

The state proclaimed October 12, 1899, as "Dewey Day" to honor native son George Dewey, the hero of Battle of Manila Bay in the Spanish–American War. Thousands turned out from the state to his hometown of Montpelier for the celebration. In 1899, Hubbard Park was established with a donation of land, known as "Hubbard Hill", bequeathed to the City of Montpelier by John Erastus Hubbard (1847–1899) with the intent to "preserve wilderness" for future generations. In 1911, additional land was donated and from 1915 to 1930 an observation tower was constructed on this donated land.

In 1927, after a particularly wet summer and fall, heavy rains began on the evening of November 2 that continued until the morning of November 4. The heaviest rain fell on November 3, when more than seven inches fell in a six-hour period. The prolonged heavy rains on top of the already saturated soil from the summer and fall proved to be more than the watercourses could handle. Brooks and rivers overflowed, carrying trees and logs in their wake. Dams, bridges and embankments were destroyed. Buildings were submerged, farm animals drowned, and homes and barns were swept away. Rivers reached 13 feet or more above their normal depths. Flood waters gradually receded, leaving behind silt, gravel and debris. At least a foot of mud was left on the floors of downtown stores.

At the time, only two stores in Montpelier carried flood insurance. The staggering loss represented an average of $400 for every man, woman, and child in town—equivalent to roughly $5,760 in 2018 dollars. In the days following the flood, Vermont was widely praised for its recovery efforts. President Calvin Coolidge, in particular, hailed the “indomitable spirit” of Vermonters, of whom he was one.

In response to the damage suffered by Montpelier and surrounding communities in the Great Flood of 1927, the Civilian Conservation Corps built the Wrightsville Dam during a period from 1933 to 1935. The resulting reservoir, Wrightsville Reservoir, required the disbandment and flooding of the village of Wrightsville, which contained at least 30 built structures at the time.

The City of Montpelier grew slowly in the late 19th and early 20th centuries during the period of intensive out-migration from the state to new lands in the West, or to industrial centers elsewhere in New England. Montpelier was already established as a government, market, service and industrial center in the region. When the automobile arrived, new state highways were routed to the city limits, and traffic then circulated through the original streets of the city. In 1954, a new bridge was constructed at Bailey Avenue which linked to an extension of Winooski Avenue, now Memorial Drive, and diverted some of the traffic from the downtown area.

The 2025 No Kings protest

An early spring thaw in March 1992 caused an ice jam to form in the Winooski River downstream of the Bailey Avenue bridge in Montpelier. In less than an hour, water levels in the Winooski and North Branch rivers rose upstream of the ice jam and flooded downtown Montpelier. The damage shut down 120 businesses, left 50 residents without homes, disrupted the operations of state government, and caused upwards of $5 million in damage.

Heavy rains on July 10–11, 2023, resulted in catastrophic flooding in Montpelier and many other parts of Vermont. In addition to many residences, the waters severely affected multiple downtown businesses as well as the city's fire department, police department, and City Hall.

In October 2025, a protest was held as part of the larger October 2025 No Kings protests movement.

== Geography ==
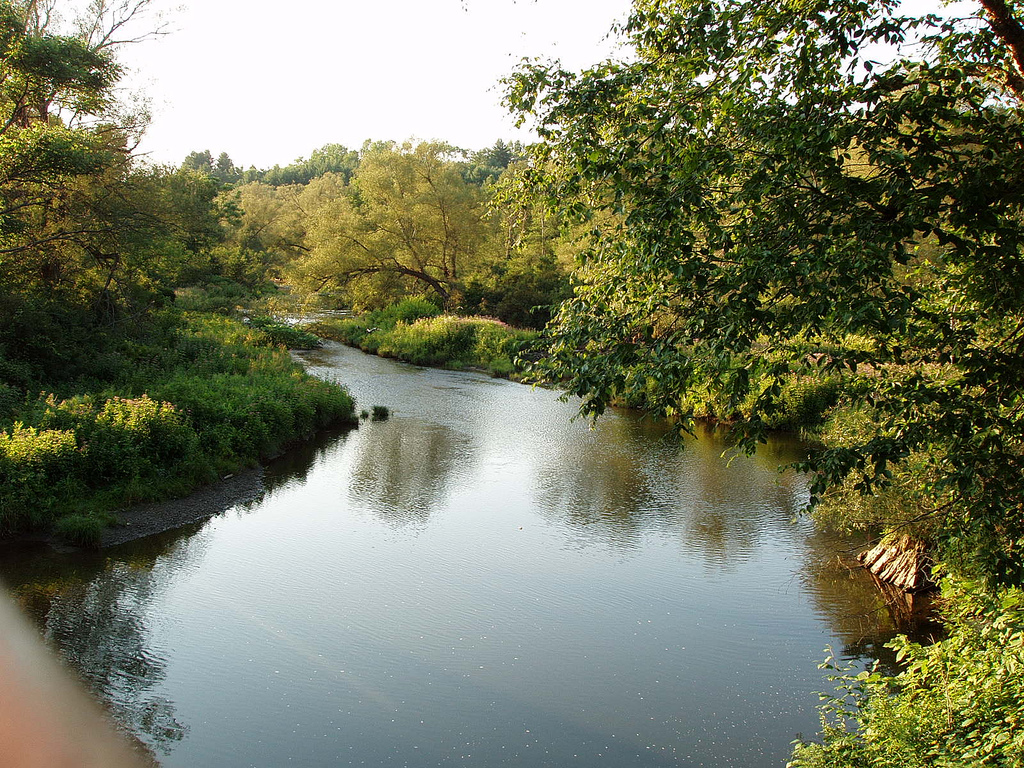
Winooski River at Montpelier

Montpelier is located in the north-central area of Vermont. The city center is a flat clay zone (elevation 520 ft; 160 m), surrounded by hills and granite ledges. Towne Hill runs in a 2-mile (3.2 km) ridge (~900 ft; 270 m) along the northern edge of the city.

According to the United States Census Bureau, the city has a total area of 10.3 square miles (27 km^{2}), of which 10.2 square miles (26 km^{2}) is land and 0.10% is water. The Winooski River flows west along the south edge of downtown village and is fed by several smaller tributaries that cut through residential districts. Montpelier has been subject to periodic flooding in the flat city center, with two major floods occurring in 1927 and in 1992.

On its borders are the towns of Middlesex to the west, Berlin to the south, and East Montpelier to the north and east. Montpelier lies near the geographic center of the state. Though it does not share a border, Montpelier is frequently associated with the nearby city of Barre, and the two are often referred to together as "Barre-Montpelier".

=== Climate ===
Montpelier features a humid continental climate (Köppen Dfb), with long, cold, and snowy winters, short springs and autumns, and warm, humid summers. From January to July, daily means range from 16.4 to 67.3 °F (−8.7 to 19.6 °C). In winter, lows fall below 0 °F or −17.8 °C on 24 mornings and daytime highs stay below freezing for the majority of afternoons from December to February. Snow is also frequent and remains on the ground for long stretches throughout the winter, though thaws are by no means infrequent. Average annual snowfall is 94.2 inches or 2.39 meters. Summers are warm and often humid, with 2 or 3 days above 90 °F or 32.2 °C, but rarely reaching 95 °F or 35 °C.

Extremes have ranged from −34 °F or −36.7 °C in January 1981 to 97 °F or 36.1 °C, most recently recorded in July 1977.

Climate data for Montpelier, VT (Edward F. Knapp State Airport) 1991–2020 normals, extremes 1948–present)
Month	Jan	Feb	Mar	Apr	May	Jun	Jul	Aug	Sep	Oct	Nov	Dec	Year
Record high °F (°C)	66 (19)	70 (21)	82 (28)	90 (32)	91 (33)	95 (35)	97 (36)	97 (36)	92 (33)	85 (29)	76 (24)	67 (19)	97 (36)
Mean maximum °F (°C)	50.3 (10.2)	50.0 (10.0)	59.8 (15.4)	75.6 (24.2)	83.8 (28.8)	87.9 (31.1)	88.4 (31.3)	87.0 (30.6)	83.7 (28.7)	74.5 (23.6)	65.0 (18.3)	51.9 (11.1)	90.2 (32.3)
Mean daily maximum °F (°C)	25.8 (−3.4)	28.9 (−1.7)	37.6 (3.1)	51.5 (10.8)	65.0 (18.3)	73.2 (22.9)	77.6 (25.3)	76.1 (24.5)	68.6 (20.3)	55.3 (12.9)	42.8 (6.0)	31.3 (−0.4)	52.8 (11.6)
Daily mean °F (°C)	16.6 (−8.6)	18.9 (−7.3)	27.9 (−2.3)	40.9 (4.9)	53.3 (11.8)	61.8 (16.6)	66.5 (19.2)	64.9 (18.3)	57.4 (14.1)	45.5 (7.5)	34.4 (1.3)	23.2 (−4.9)	42.6 (5.9)
Mean daily minimum °F (°C)	7.4 (−13.7)	8.9 (−12.8)	18.1 (−7.7)	30.3 (−0.9)	41.7 (5.4)	50.5 (10.3)	55.5 (13.1)	53.7 (12.1)	46.3 (7.9)	35.7 (2.1)	26.0 (−3.3)	15.1 (−9.4)	32.4 (0.2)
Mean minimum °F (°C)	−16.7 (−27.1)	−12.0 (−24.4)	−4.3 (−20.2)	17.0 (−8.3)	28.5 (−1.9)	37.8 (3.2)	45.1 (7.3)	43.1 (6.2)	32.3 (0.2)	22.6 (−5.2)	9.1 (−12.7)	−6.9 (−21.6)	−19.2 (−28.4)
Record low °F (°C)	−34 (−37)	−29 (−34)	−18 (−28)	2 (−17)	20 (−7)	29 (−2)	35 (2)	31 (−1)	20 (−7)	14 (−10)	−7 (−22)	−27 (−33)	−34 (−37)
Average precipitation inches (mm)	2.32 (59)	2.06 (52)	2.49 (63)	3.04 (77)	3.52 (89)	4.21 (107)	4.27 (108)	3.81 (97)	3.33 (85)	3.87 (98)	2.85 (72)	2.93 (74)	38.70 (983)
Average snowfall inches (cm)	22.6 (57)	18.0 (46)	16.8 (43)	4.9 (12)	0.0 (0.0)	0.0 (0.0)	0.0 (0.0)	0.0 (0.0)	0.0 (0.0)	0.9 (2.3)	9.1 (23)	21.9 (56)	94.2 (239)
Average precipitation days (≥ 0.01 in)	13.6	13.2	12.7	13.5	13.9	14.4	14.0	12.6	10.9	13.9	13.9	15.4	162.0
Average snowy days (≥ 0.1 in)	12.0	9.1	7.5	3.3	0.0	0.0	0.0	0.0	0.0	0.9	5.7	11.7	50.2
Average ultraviolet index	1	2	3	5	7	8	8	7	5	3	2	1	4
Source 1: NOAA (snow 1981–2010)
Source 2: Weather Atlas

== Demographics ==
Historical population
Census	Pop.	Note	%±
1790	118		—
1800	890		654.2%
1810	1,877		110.9%
1820	2,308		23.0%
1830	1,193		−48.3%
1840	3,725		212.2%
1850	2,310		−38.0%
1860	2,411		4.4%
1870	3,023		25.4%
1880	3,219		6.5%
1890	4,160		29.2%
1900	6,266		50.6%
1910	7,856		25.4%
1920	7,125		−9.3%
1930	7,837		10.0%
1940	8,006		2.2%
1950	8,559		6.9%
1960	8,782		2.6%
1970	8,609		−2.0%
1980	8,241		−4.3%
1990	8,247		0.1%
2000	8,035		−2.6%
2010	7,855		−2.2%
2020	8,074		2.8%
U.S. Decennial Census

Along with Barre, the city forms a small micropolitan area in the center of the state; together they are known as the twin cities.

At the 2019 American Community Survey, an estimated 7,852 people lived in the city.

In 2019, the racial and ethnic makeup of Montpelier was 92.2% non-Hispanic white, 1.6% Black or African American, 1.5% Asian, 2.4% two or more races, and 2.3% Hispanic or Latin American of any race. Among the population in 2019, 4.1% were foreign-born persons.

In 2019, there were 3,668 households with an average of 2.03 persons per household. The city had an owner-occupied housing rate of 55.6% and median value of owner-occupied housing rate of $252,600. The median monthly cost of an owner-occupied housing unit was $1,827 and without a mortgage $822. The city had a median gross rent of $1,022.

=== Racial and ethnic composition ===
Montpelier city, Vermont – Racial composition Note: the US Census treats Hispanic/Latino as an ethnic category. This table excludes Latinos from the racial categories and assigns them to a separate category. Hispanics/Latinos may be of any race.
Race (NH = Non-Hispanic)	% 2020	% 2010	% 2000	Pop 2020	Pop 2010	Pop 2000
White alone (NH)	87.2%	92.3%	95.4%	7,038	7,249	7,667
Black alone (NH)	1.1%	0.9%	0.6%	87	74	50
American Indian alone (NH)	0.1%	0.2%	0.2%	12	18	19
Asian alone (NH)	2.6%	2.1%	0.8%	211	168	66
Pacific Islander alone (NH)	0.1%	0%	0%	6	2	1
Other race alone (NH)	0.8%	0.1%	0.2%	68	9	19
Multiracial (NH)	4.9%	2.2%	1.2%	399	169	100
Hispanic/Latino (any race)	3.1%	2.1%	1.4%	253	166	113

=== 2020 census ===
As of the 2020 census, Montpelier had a population of 8,074 and a median age of 44.0 years (42.5 years for males and 45.5 years for females). 18.9% of residents were under the age of 18, 20.8% were 19 years old and younger, and 22.7% were 65 years of age or older. For every 100 females there were 85.0 males, and for every 100 females age 18 and over there were 81.8 males age 18 and over.

The most common ancestries reported were English (28.6%), Irish (23.1%), German (16.6%), French (9.6%), Scottish (9.5%), and Italian (8.6%).

85.5% of residents lived in urban areas, while 14.5% lived in rural areas.

There were 3,929 households in Montpelier, of which 23.3% had children under the age of 18 living in them. Of all households, 35.9% were married-couple households, 20.6% were households with a male householder and no spouse or partner present, and 35.9% were households with a female householder and no spouse or partner present. About 42.4% of all households were made up of individuals and 18.8% had someone living alone who was 65 years of age or older.

There were 4,177 housing units, of which 5.9% were vacant. The homeowner vacancy rate was 0.5% and the rental vacancy rate was 4.1%.

Racial composition as of the 2020 census
Race	Number	Percent
White	7,090	87.8%
Black or African American	90	1.1%
American Indian and Alaska Native	12	0.1%
Asian	211	2.6%
Native Hawaiian and Other Pacific Islander	6	0.1%
Some other race	94	1.2%
Two or more races	571	7.1%
Hispanic or Latino (of any race)	253	3.1%

=== 2010 census ===
At the census of 2010, there were 7,855 people, 3,739 households, and 1,940 families residing in the city. The population density was 784.0 people per square mile (302.7 people/km^{2}). There were 3,899 housing units at an average density of 380.4 per square mile (146.9/km^{2}).

At the 2010 census, there were 3,739 households, out of which 26.0% had children under the age of 18 years living with them, 38.5% were married couples living together, 10.1% had a female householder with no husband present, and 48.1% were non-families. 39.4% of all households were made up of individuals, and 13.1% had someone living alone who was 65 years of age or older. The average household size was 2.09 and the average family size was 2.84.

In the city, the population was spread out, with 21.3% under the age of 18, 8.6% from 18 to 24, 28.2% from 25 to 44, 27.1% from 45 to 64, and 14.9% who were 65 years of age or older. The median age was 40 years. For every 100 females, there were 84.2 males. For every 100 females age 18 and over, there were 82.0 males.

The median income for a household in the city was $37,513, and the median income for a family was $51,818. Males had a median income of $35,957 versus $29,442 for females. The per capita income for the city was $22,599. About 7.2% of families and 9.8% of the population were below the poverty line, including 12.9% of those under age 18 and 5.7% of those age 65 or over.

== Economy ==
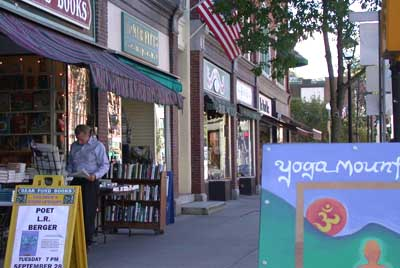
Downtown shops

Government, higher education, insurance and tourism are principal businesses in Montpelier.

=== Industry ===
Since the city's establishment as capital in 1805, the primary business in Montpelier has been state government. By the mid-19th century, Montpelier was also the home of life and fire insurance companies including National Life Group.

The majority of businesses in the downtown area, mostly retail, are locally owned. These include antiques, books, handmade toys, crafts, kitchenware, jewelry, and Vermont-themed gifts.

Montpelier is the only state capital that has neither at least one Starbucks location nor one McDonald's store.

The Savoy Theater, which was opened in 1905, is an eclectic art house with a main theater that holds 120 and a smaller room that holds 35. It specializes in documentaries, independent features, and international films. The annual Green Mountain Film Festival is held in Montpelier, and is hosted by the Savoy.

=== Tourism ===
The Vermont History Museum, operated in The Pavilion by the Vermont Historical Society, is an attraction.

== Arts and culture ==
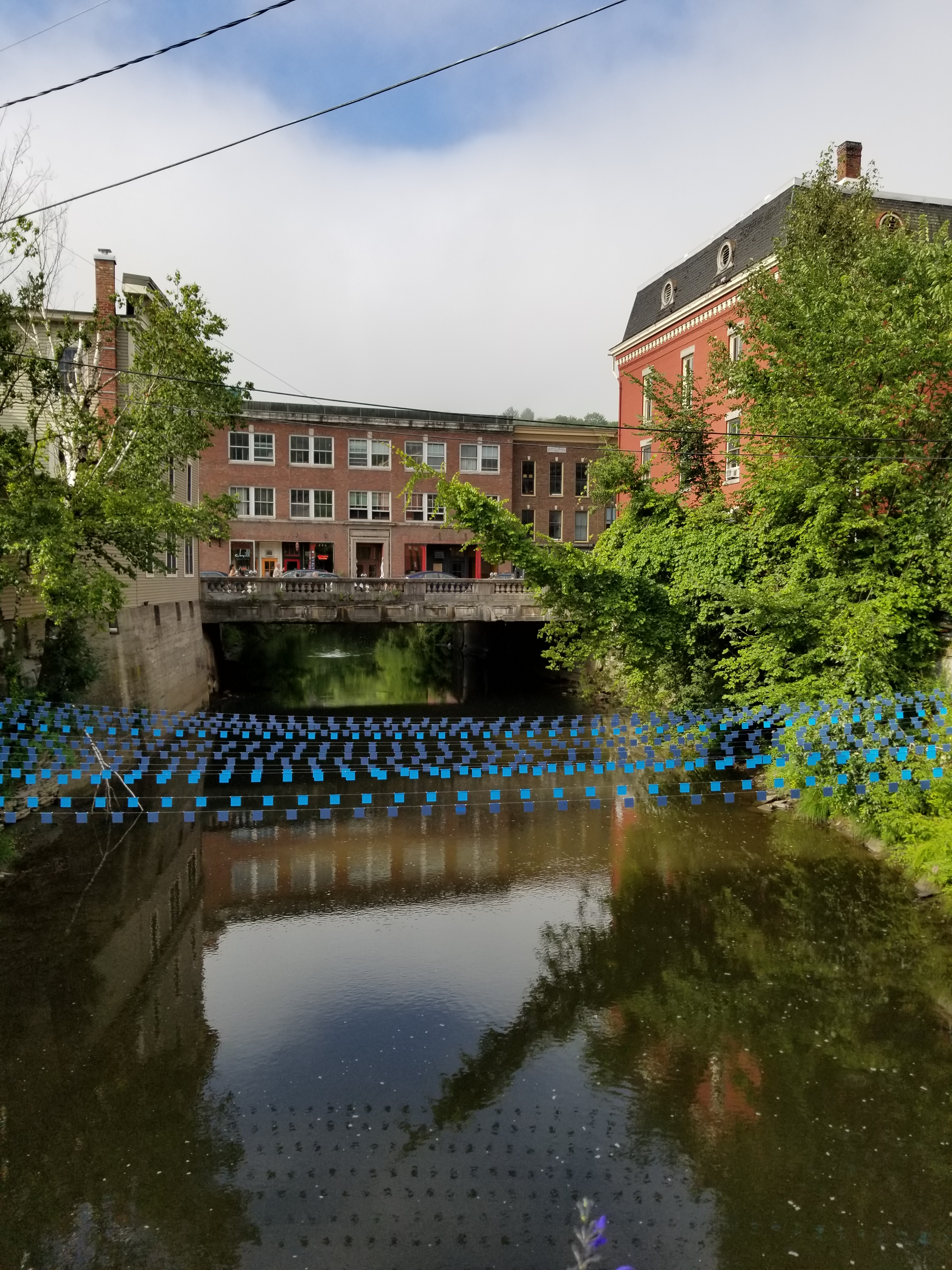
Building on State Street built near the North Branch River (tributary of Winooski River).

- Kellogg-Hubbard Library—with a copy of the Parthenon Frieze
- Lost Nation Theater
- Montpelier Theatre Guild
- Vermont History Museum—in The Pavilion
- Vermont State House
- T. W. Wood Gallery & Arts Center
- Capital City Concerts
- An annual local vernacular culture phenomenon, the Valentine Phantom, a tradition of covering downtown storefronts and public buildings with red hearts each February 14, began in Montpelier in the 1990s.

== Sports ==
The Vermont Mountaineers of the New England Collegiate Baseball League play at the Montpelier Recreation Field.

The Grand Depart of the Vermont Super 8 bikepacking route takes place on the steps of the capitol each fall.

== Parks and recreation ==
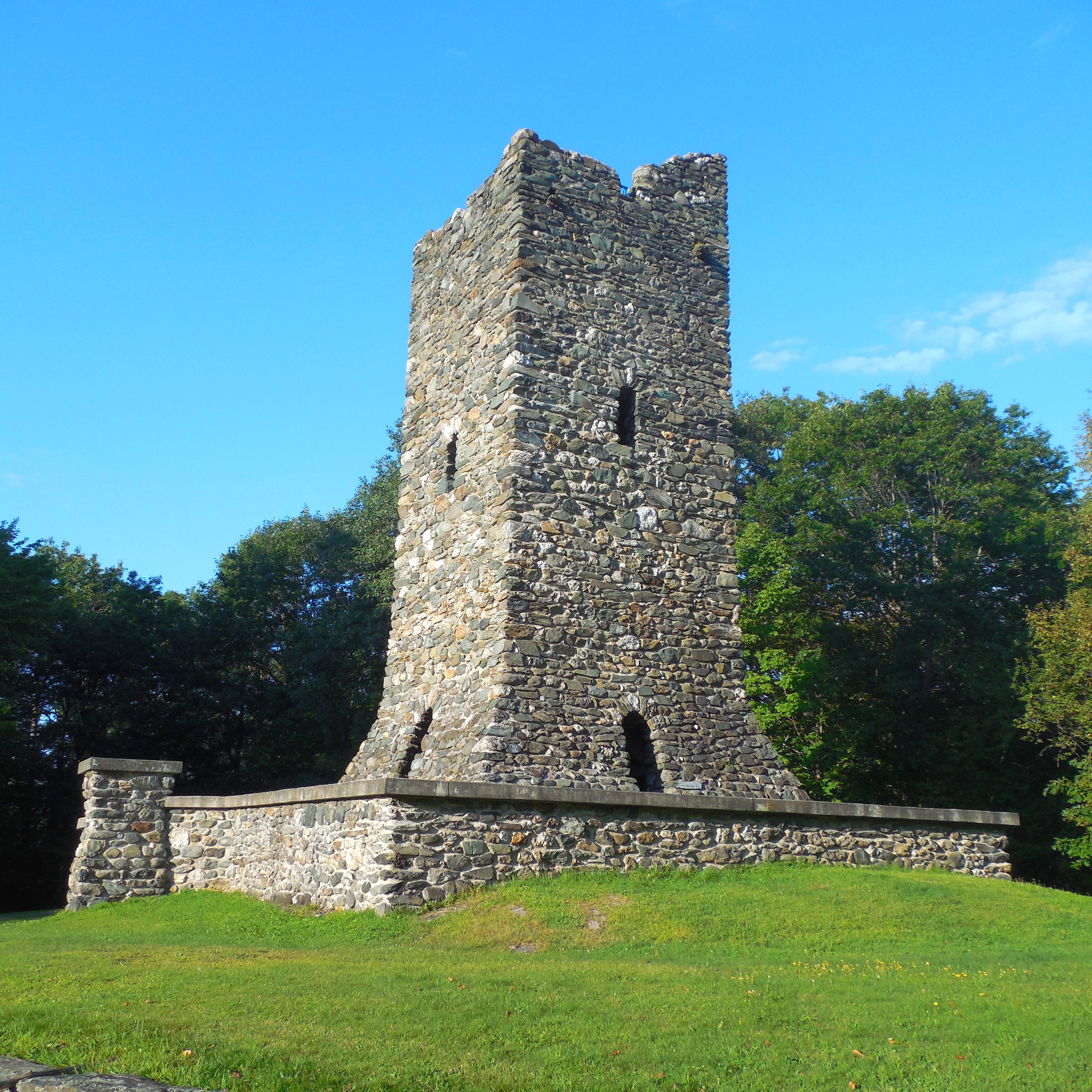
Hubbard Park Observation Tower, built 1915–1930

The city has three city nature centers. Hubbard Park rises behind the state capitol building and extends along the ridge line towards the north past the pool to the stump dump. Accessible from Cummings Street off State Route 12, the North Branch River Park is the second-largest park in the city. The Mill Pond Park is located along State Route 12 approximately 0.25 miles (0.40 km) from the cemetery and features boat access to the North Branch river, as well as benches and short-term parking. The North Branch Nature Center is located at the northern end of town and includes 17 acres (6.9 ha) of protected land as well as a community nature center. A bridge from the North Branch Nature Center connects the land to the North Branch River Park on the opposite side of the North Branch River. In recent years, North Branch River Park has significantly expanding its mountain biking trails, making it a hub for area mountain bikers of all ages. The first mountain bike trail in North Branch River Park was constructed and opened in 2005 as part of a partnership between the Montpelier Area Mountain Bike Association and the Montpelier Parks Department. Since that time, 4 additional miles of trails have been added. A pump track is also currently under construction.

== Government ==
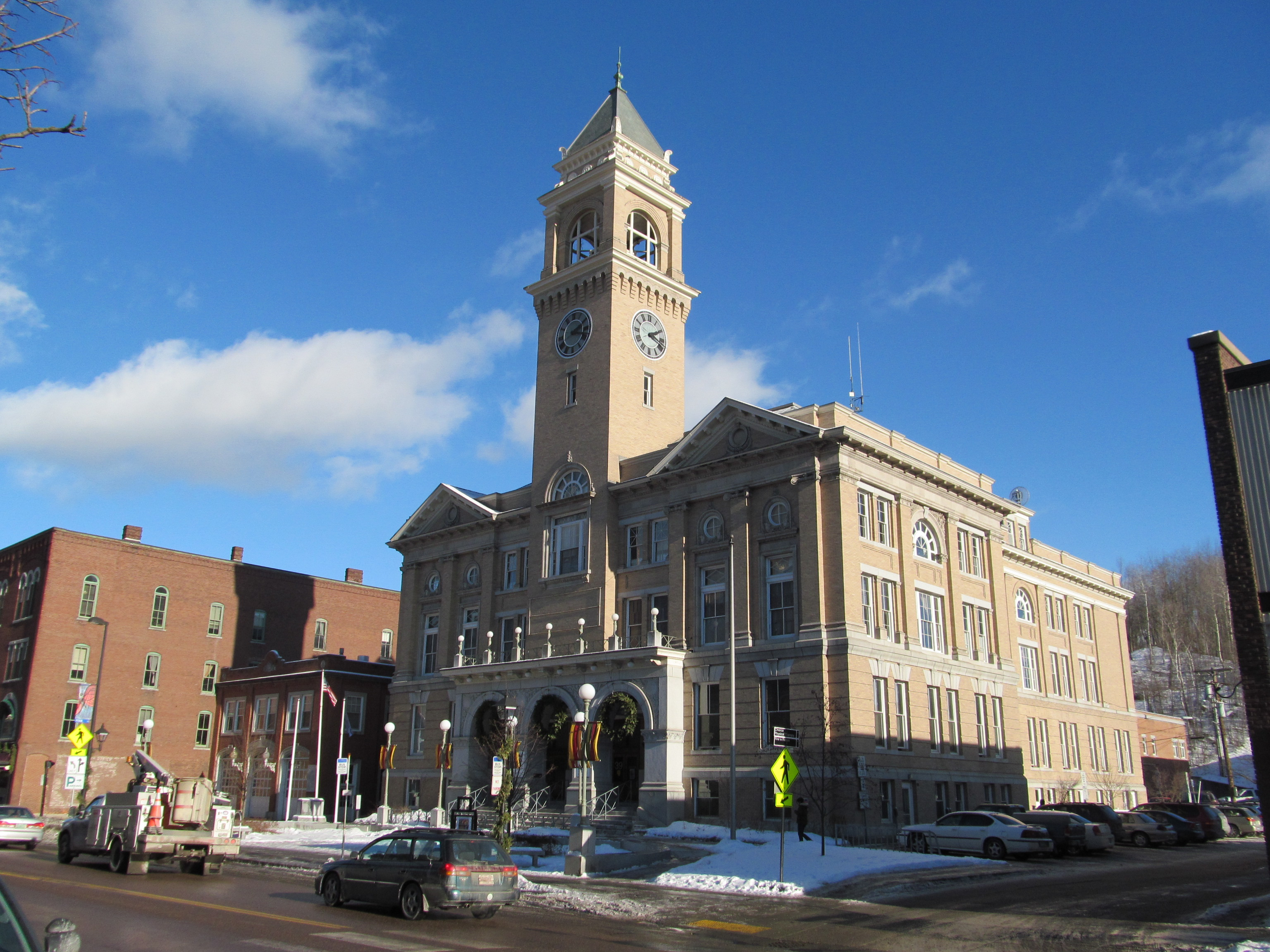
Montpelier City Hall

Montpelier's government maintains a city council, city manager, and mayor. The city council consists of a mayor and six members. Council members are elected on a nonpartisan ballot from three districts, with councilors serving staggered two-year terms. The mayor is elected to a two-year term in each even-numbered year on a nonpartisan ballot in a citywide election. The council appoints the city manager who is the chief administrative officer of the city. Combining its status as the seat of state government as well as its distinctly hilly and rugged terrain, Montpelier is sometimes referred to as a city on seven hills in the image of Rome, and is arguably the smallest city to be able to lay such a claim.

The city provides municipal services for its residents and businesses. These include local law enforcement, firefighting, planning and zoning regulation, and provision for potable drinking water and wastewater.

Politically, Montpelier is a Democratic stronghold. In the 2020 United States presidential election, Joe Biden received 88 percent of the vote to Donald Trump's 9 percent.

== Education ==
Montpelier-Roxbury Supervisory Union is the school district covering the city.

- Public schools include:
  - Montpelier High School
  - Main Street Middle School
  - Union Elementary School
- A campus of the Community College of Vermont
- Union Institute & University Vermont campus, offers a Master of Education program through a low-residency (online) program
- Vermont College of Fine Arts is a low-residency graduate school offering Masters of Fine Arts degrees in visual arts, writing, and writing for children and young adults

== Media ==
The Barre Montpelier Times Argus is a daily newspaper that serves Montpelier and Washington County. The Montpelier Bridge is a semi-monthly paper covering the Montpelier area. The broadcast television station WNNE (The CW) is licensed to the city. ORCA Media is a non-profit community media center that serves Montpelier and surrounding communities, including Randolph and Waterbury.

== Infrastructure ==
=== Transportation ===
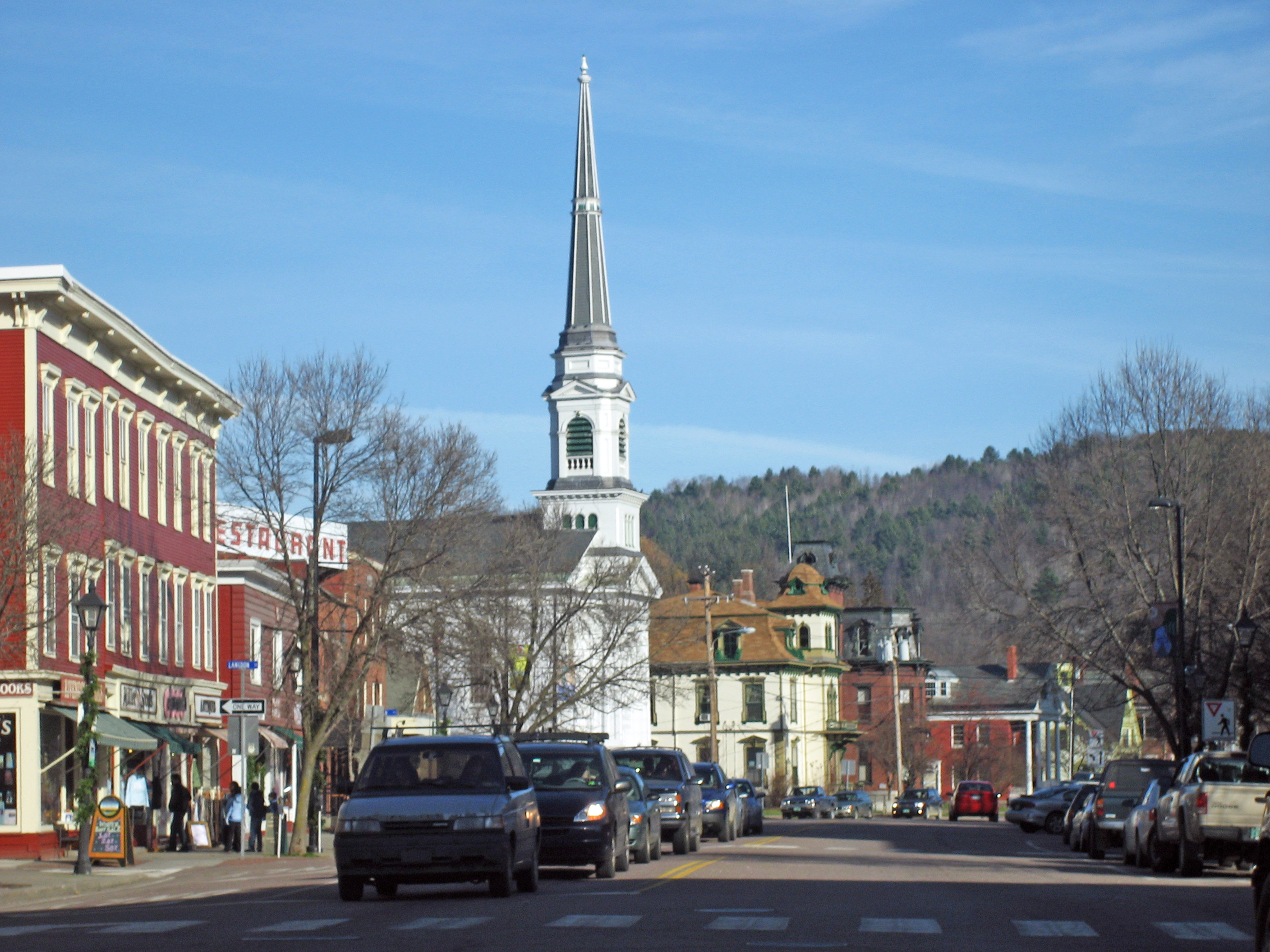
Main Street in downtown Montpelier

Montpelier has become one of Vermont's most readily accessible cities and towns, as Vermont's founders deliberately placed the capital near the geographic center of the state.

==== Roads ====
The city is located along Interstate 89. East–west U.S. Route 2 and north–south Vermont Route 12 are two other principal routes that intersect in Montpelier. Both I-89 and U.S. 2 provide a direct link to Burlington and the populous Lake Champlain Valley in the northwestern corner of the state. U.S. Route 302 has its western terminus in Montpelier, connecting it with the nearby city of Barre and points east.

==== Rail ====
Amtrak, the national passenger rail system, provides daily service from its station at Montpelier Junction in the neighboring town of Berlin, on the route known as the "Vermonter", operating between St. Albans, Vermont and Washington, D.C.

==== Bus ====
Greyhound and Megabus operate buses that serve Montpelier. The Green Mountain Transit Authority (GMTA) operates a local bus network throughout the micropolitan area, with stops in Montpelier and Barre, including nearby Waterbury, the Vermont State House, the Ben & Jerry's factory, and the local Berlin Mall. GMTA and its sister bus company in Burlington, the Chittenden County Transportation Authority (CCTA), operate a series of LINK commuter buses with stops in Montpelier, Burlington, Richmond, and Waterbury.

==== Air ====
Air travelers in private planes can use the Edward F. Knapp State Airport in Berlin to access Montpelier. The Burlington International Airport in Chittenden County is the closest commercial air service, located 35 miles (56 km) northwest of Montpelier.

==== Other ====
Two shared-use paths for walking and bicycling connect to Montpelier: the Cross Vermont Trail and the Central Vermont Regional Path. Montpelier's downtown is relatively compact and pedestrian-friendly, with sidewalks and crosswalks throughout the downtown area.

== Sister cities ==
- Zapopan, Mexico

== See also ==
- Athenwood and the Thomas W. Wood Studio – historic buildings in Montpelier
- Christ Episcopal Church – historic church in Montpelier
- Saint Augustine's Church – historic church in Montpelier
- USS Montpelier, 3 ships
