= The Pavilion (Vermont) =

Principal workplace of the Governor of Vermont

Coordinates: 44.2612°N 72.5794°W

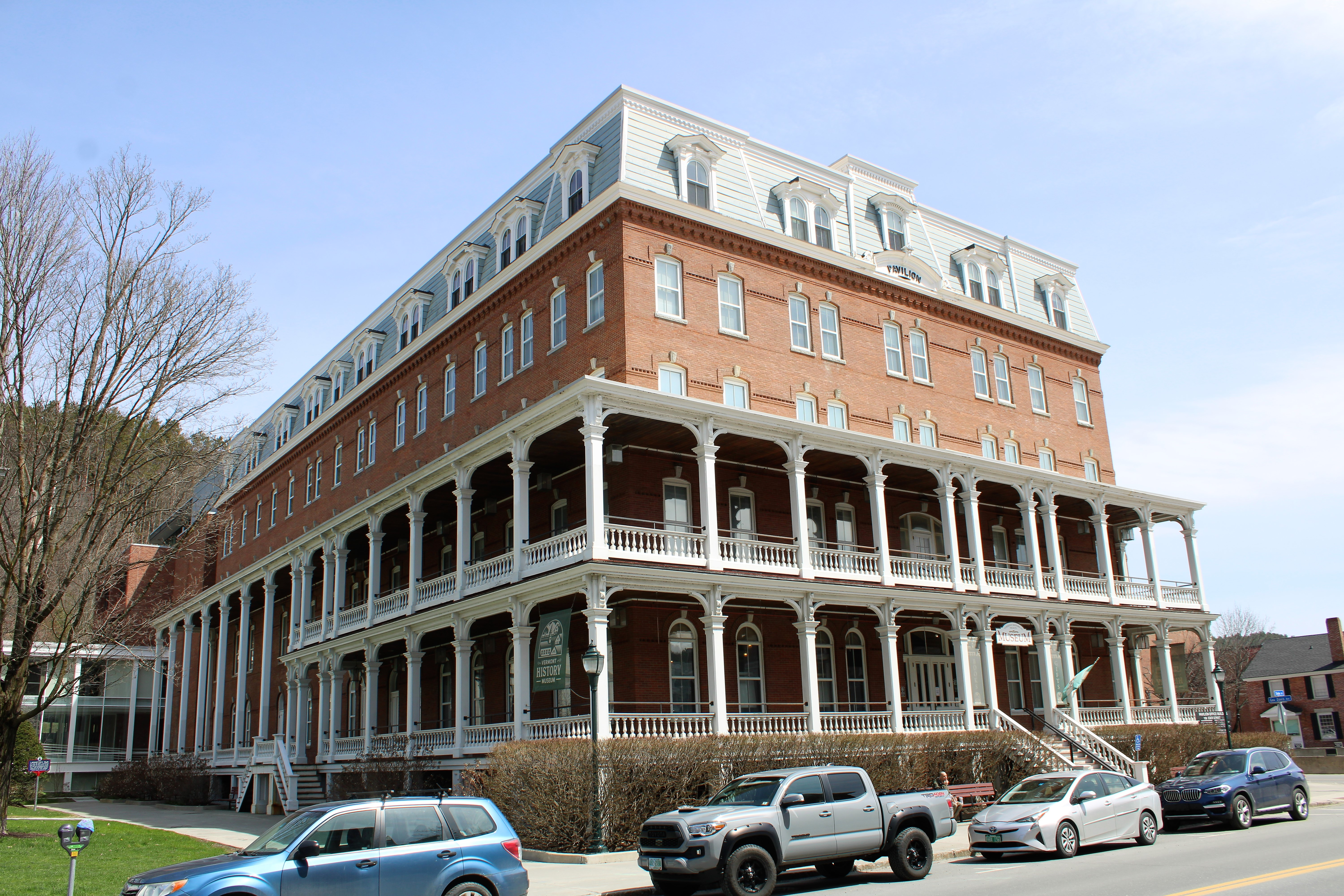
Main facade

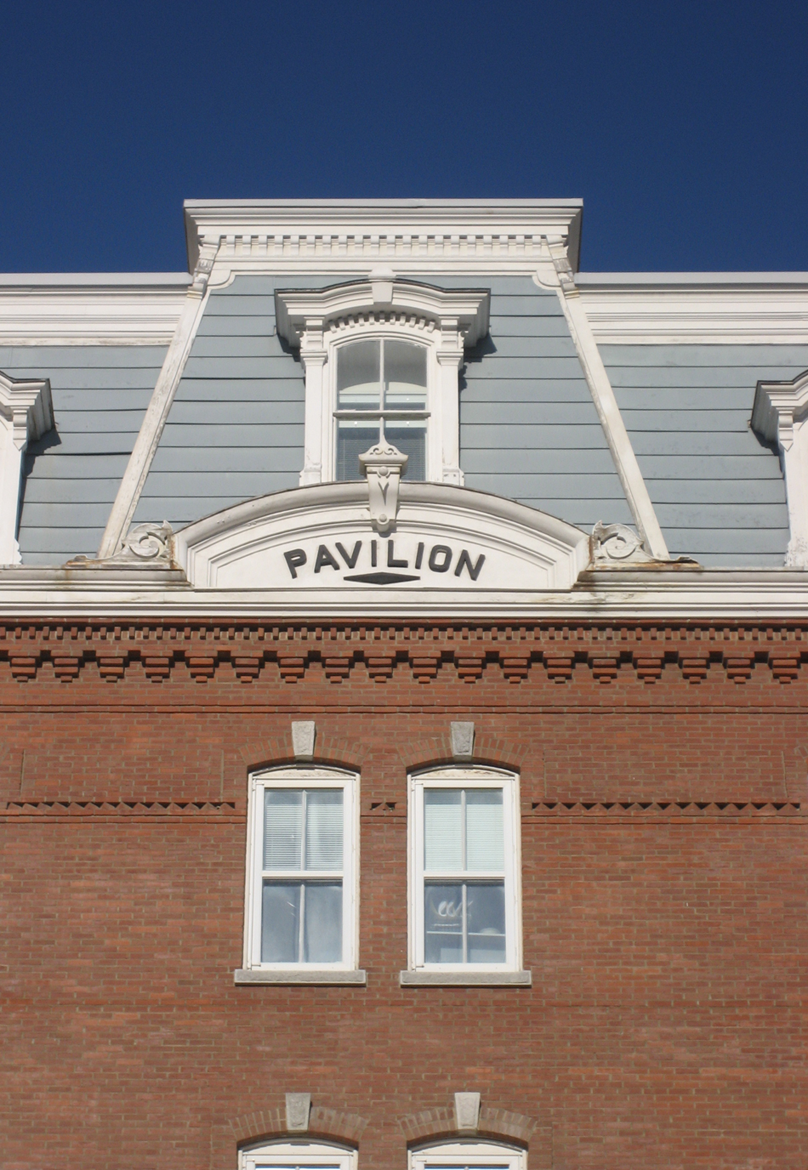
Detail of the mansard roof

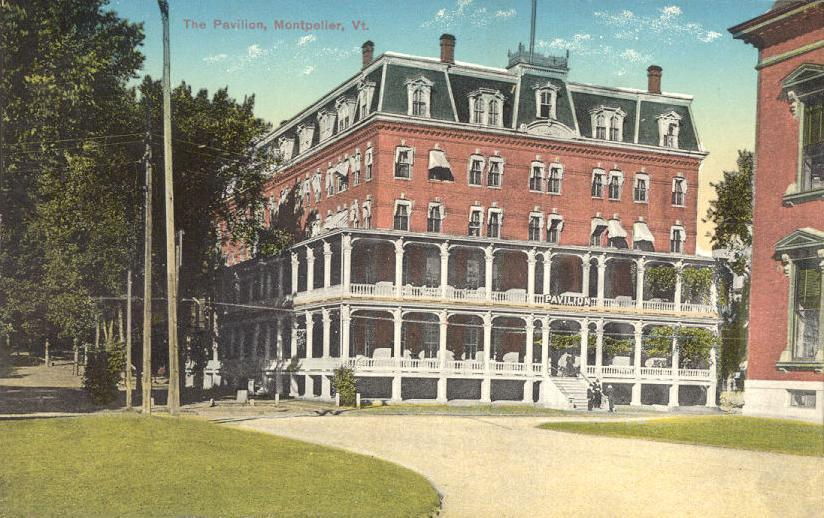
C. 1915

The Pavilion is the principal workplace of the governor of Vermont, located at 109 State Street in Montpelier, capital of the U.S. state of Vermont. The building is built in the French Second Empire style, and houses the working offices, reception room, press briefing room, and living apartments of Vermont's governor. The term "The Fifth Floor" is sometimes used as a metonym for a governor's administration, or the Vermont governorship, which refers to the location of the governor's offices on the fifth floor of the Pavilion. The offices of two other elected statewide officials, the attorney general and the state treasurer, are housed in the Pavilion along with the Agency of Administration and the Vermont Historical Society and its museum.

== Building history ==
=== Operation as a hotel ===
The five-story building is a 1971 reconstruction of an 1876 hotel, also called the Pavilion. While a hotel, the Pavilion was colloquially referred to as Vermont's "third house" (after the Senate and House of Representatives) because it was so intertwined with Vermont's political history, and, while a hotel, served as a home for many of Vermont's legislators.

The first hotel on the site was a three-story building built in 1807–1808 by Thomas Davis. This building was designed by Sylvanus Baldwin, representative for Montpelier in the Vermont General Assembly and a self-taught architect-builder who also designed the first Vermont State House sited roughly on the site of the present Vermont Supreme Court. Shortly after construction Davis sold the hotel to Mahlon Cottrill who greatly enlarged the building, rebuilding it in the Greek Revival style. Cottrill established the name The Pavilion, and added piazzas on the south and west sides as in the present building. In 1874 Theron O. Bailey acquired the hotel, razed the second building and erected a new ninety-guestroom Pavilion, adding two full floors, and an attic floor below its fashionable new mansard roof. Steam powered elevators carried guests from the ground to fifth floor. Two new ball rooms, dining rooms, and lounges were added – all lit by gas jet. A large two-story Italianate style piazza was added on the south side facing State Street, and to the west facing the public lawn of the Vermont State House. Bailey's grand new hotel cost $100,000, and opened in time for the 1876 Centennial of American Independence.

For three-quarters of a century the Pavilion remained the grand hotel of Montpelier. An increase in legislators willing to commute, by car, from home to the state house, contributed to the hotel's steady decline. The hotel ceased operation in October 1966.

=== Reconstruction as a state office ===
The state of Vermont acquired the property in 1969. Restoration and reuse of the building was briefly considered, but a pressing need for expansion of state offices in the capital complex area, coupled with a lack of sensitivity for historic preservation, led to the complete razing of the building and the subsequent construction of a new Pavilion. The west and south exterior façades are academic copies of the original building, faithful except for the missing chimneys and cast-iron cresting along the mansard roof. A large two-story piazza wraps around the building's south and west sides as in the 1876 building. The entry foyer on State Street and an adjacent reception room recreate the building's original ornate French Second Empire style interiors complete with polychrome stencilling, period artwork, and furnishings.

== Use by Vermont's executive branch ==
=== New working offices for the governorship ===
When the current building opened in 1971, Governor Dean Davis had the offices of the governor located in the southeast corner of the fifth floor, approached from a long corridor then used as a gallery of Vermont artists. A modernist addition, in the form of a contemporary steel and glass wing was added to the building in the 1980s. This wing is to the northwest, directly north of the state library and Vermont Supreme Court. The working office of the governor was moved to this wing, providing the office with a dramatic view of the State House dome to the northwest. A ceremonial office for the governor is provided in the State House, and is used on a near daily basis during legislative sessions.

=== Living apartments ===
The state of Vermont previously maintained an official residence for Vermont's governors called the Chester Wright House at 159 State Street, a large late Georgian style house built in 1809. The Greek Revival portico and terrace was added later in the nineteenth century. The family of Governor Joseph B. Johnson were the last regular residents, leaving the house at the end of his term in 1959. The house was used sporadically until the mid-1960s when the house was sold due to lack of use.

A residential apartment for the governor was built in the northwest portion of the building during the administration of Madeleine M. Kunin. These rooms are used infrequently by recent governors but can be useful to Vermont's governor during emergencies or the legislative session when work is sometimes conducted late into the night.
