= Statue of Ethan Allen =

Sculpture by Larkin Goldsmith Mead

Ethan Allen
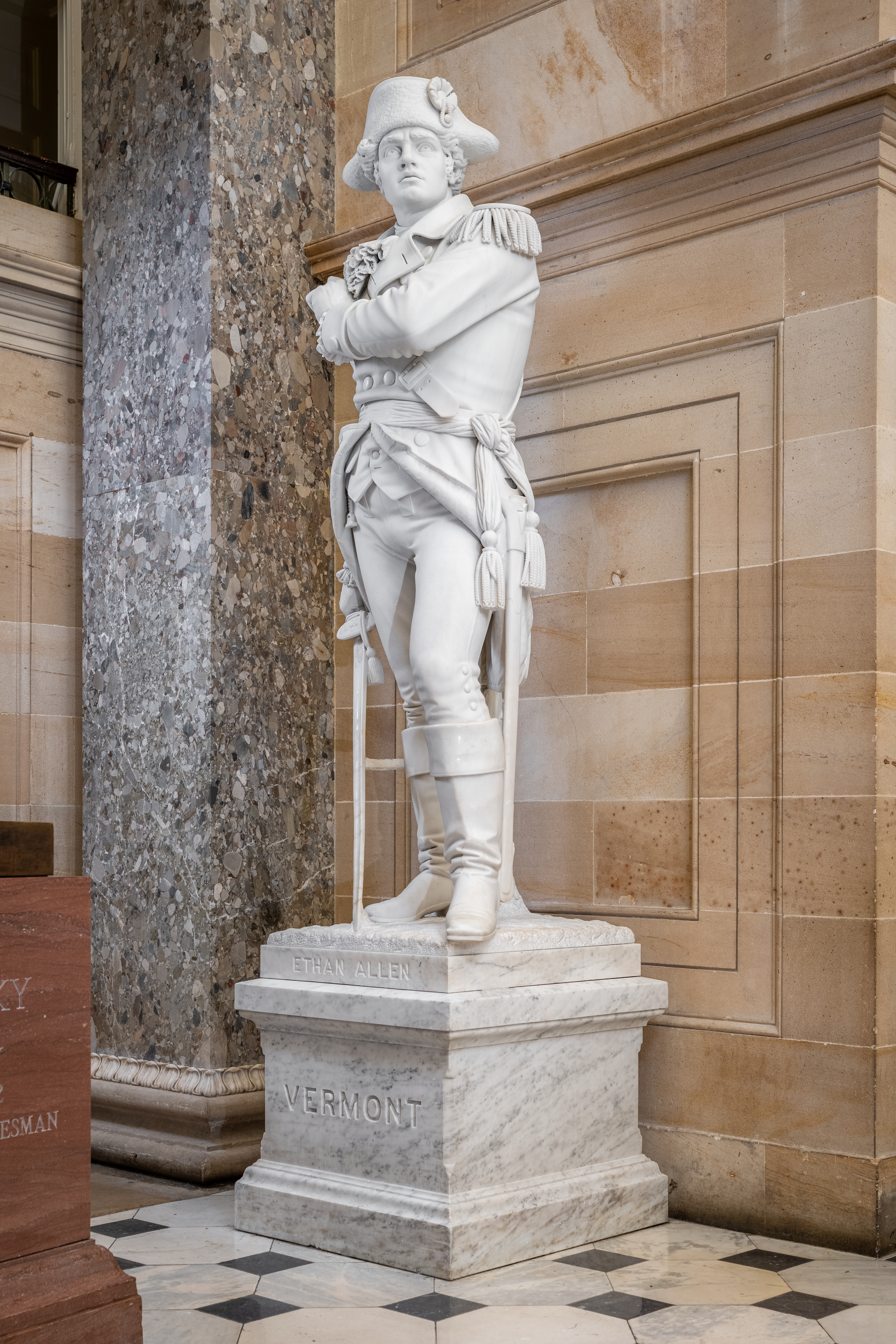
- The statue in the National Statuary Hall in 2023
- Artist: Larkin Goldsmith Mead
- Medium: Sculpture
- Subject: Ethan Allen

Ethan Allen is a marble sculpture of Ethan Allen by Larkin Goldsmith Mead.

== Vermont State House ==
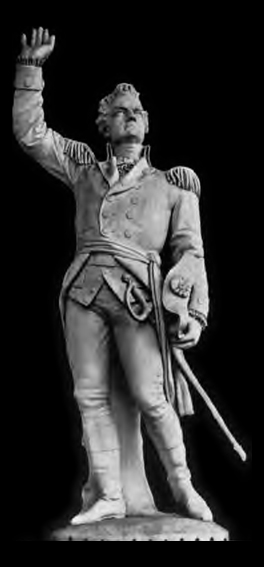
The statue formerly installed outside the Vermont State House

A statue of Allen with a different design by Mead formerly stood outside the Vermont State House in Montpelier. Dedicated on October 10, 1861, it deteriorated and was later destroyed.

== National Statuary Hall Collection ==
Another statue of Meade by Allen is in the United States Capitol as part of the National Statuary Hall Collection. This statue was gifted by the state of Vermont in 1876.

== Ticonderoga Museum, Ticonderoga, New York ==
Another carving of the statue is located in the Ticonderoga Museum in Ticonderoga, New York. "The sculpture was previously in the collection of the Ohio County Library in West Virginia, where it had been donated by a local family. The Museum purchased it in 1973 or 1975. It was located outdoors and was moved inside because of deterioration."

== In popular culture ==
A photograph of the statue is featured on the cover and spine of Willard Sterne Randall's biography of Ethan Allen.
