= Valentine Phantom =

Group decorating a city in the U.S. in Valentine's day

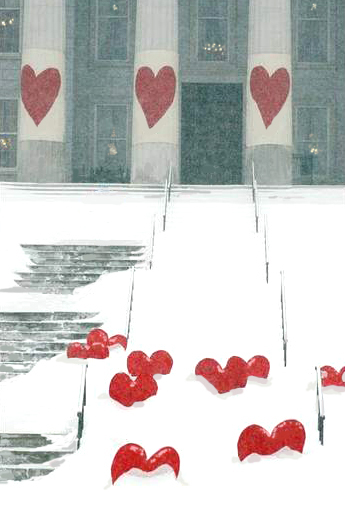
February 14, 2007 at the Vermont State House. The Valentine Phantom struck early on a snowy morning.

The Valentine Phantom, often referred to as the Valentine Bandit in media reports, refers to an unidentified individual or group who each Valentine's Day secretly decorate the downtown area of a city in the United States with a series of red hearts printed on sheets of letter-sized paper.

The reports began in Portland, Maine, in 1985, and the perpetrators remained unknown until April 2023 when the identity of one of the leaders was revealed following his death. Speculation about the individual or group which decorates before dawn each February 14 is popular in conversation, and local media, and has emerged as an example of vernacular culture.

== History ==
The earliest known occurrence was 1976 in Portland, Maine, and every year since, red hearts have appeared throughout the city on Valentine's Day morning.

Beginning in the early 2000s, red hearts drawn on white sheets of paper have been attached to the doors of businesses along the Pearl Street business district in Boulder, Colorado, each Valentine's Day, according to reports in the Daily Camera. In Boulder, the mysterious Valentine's messenger has been dubbed the "kissing bandit."

In 2002, the city of Montpelier, Vermont, became a part of the yearly tradition, with the added twist of each heart including a poem signed "The Valentine Phantom."

On Valentine's Day 2010, pink hearts appeared up and down Railroad and Main Street in St. Johnsbury, Vermont, even finding their way to the local police and fire department buildings.

On Valentine's Day 2012, this phenomenon spread to Bangor, Maine, when locals woke up to a flurry of red and white hearts throughout downtown, and the tradition continues into 2013 with the addition of messages and candy.

On Valentine's Day 2017, the bandit allowed a Bangor Daily News reporter to accompany them on their travels, in return for anonymity. The bandit, after tagging a Planned Parenthood office in Portland, stated that they are normally apolitical but felt "we could be a bit more progressive this year." A Planned Parenthood spokesperson stated that a liaison for the bandit contacted them the prior week to request permission to post a heart banner.'

On April 23, 2023, it was reported that the "driving force" behind the Valentine Bandit of Portland was Kevin Fahrman, who died two days previously at the age of 67. He took over the tradition from the original Phantom in 1979, three years after it began. He was stated to be the leader of a community effort, who all kept his identity anonymous. Many of his closest friends did not know his identity as the Phantom. Born in New York, Fahrman originally studied forestry at University of Maine at Orono before instead enrolling in the Portland School of Art and becoming a photographer, graphic artist, animator, and teacher. His obituary stated that the tradition would continue.

=== Vermont history ===
Langdon Street Bridge, Montpelier, Vermont, February 14, 2010

Montpelier's incarnation of the phenomenon began in 2002 near the corner of Main Street and State Street. The windows of shops were covered in 8.5" x 11" color copies of red hearts. They appeared before dawn, and for the most part were welcome and not seen as a nuisance. In subsequent years the center remained the intersection of Main and State streets, but grew outward to include Langdon Street, Elm Street, and lower State Street near the State House and the Pavilion. This raised speculation that the Valentine Phantom might be a team.

In 2006, for the first time, the "bandit" applied banners with large red hearts around the base of the columns on the portico of the Vermont State House. They were photographed, reproduced on web blogs and on the website of the Friends of the Vermont State House. These same banners were again displayed on the statehouse in 2007. On Valentine's Day 2008, they appeared on the chimney stack of Montpelier High School and on the tower of College Hall at the Vermont College of Fine Arts. In 2009, they were hung over the entrance of the Kellogg-Hubbard Library and from the landslide cliff on Elm Street. In 2010, two heart banners were hung from the Langdon Street Bridge.

On Valentine's Day 2007, the phenomenon became larger, and coincided with a dumping of heavy snow. The Times Argus reported, "Despite the snow, however, the Valentine bandit visited the Statehouse and other buildings in Montpelier on Wednesday to put up large red paper hearts. Other state buildings, stores and restaurants were also visited during the night, with business windows throughout downtown Montpelier covered in the red paper hearts – a mystery that has become a Valentine’s Day tradition in the state’s capital city." For the first time, sculptural hearts painted red were planted on the public lawn in front of the State House. A blizzard brought a fresh coat of snow setting off the bright red heart sculptures. The Vermont State House Sergeant at Arms, Francis Brooks, allowed the valentine banners and sculptures to remain through the day.

During the winter of 2008, the slate roof on the steeple of the Methodist church on Main Street in Montpelier was replaced by Southgate Steeple Jacks. The new slate roof features several red hearts around the base of the steeple. Jay Southgate designed the new roof for the church and was quoted in the Montpelier Bridge saying that the use of the hearts was inspired by Montpelier's Valentine Phantom. Coincidentally, February 14, 2008 was the first sunny, calm day in several weeks, allowing the Southgate crew to resume their work on the roof — that's the day they began to place the red slate of the hearts on the steeple.

On September 1, 2009, rainbow hearts mimicking the Valentine Bandit appeared around Montpelier to celebrate the legalization of same-sex marriage in Vermont.

On the morning of February 14, 2015, the residents of Montpelier awoke to find that the tradition had been broken; no hearts appeared throughout the city. In response, a group of students from the local high school hung hearts that afternoon, and the Valentine Phantom has struck again each year since.

== See also ==
- List of practical joke topics
- Poe Toaster
