= Larkin Goldsmith Mead =

American sculptor (1835–1910)

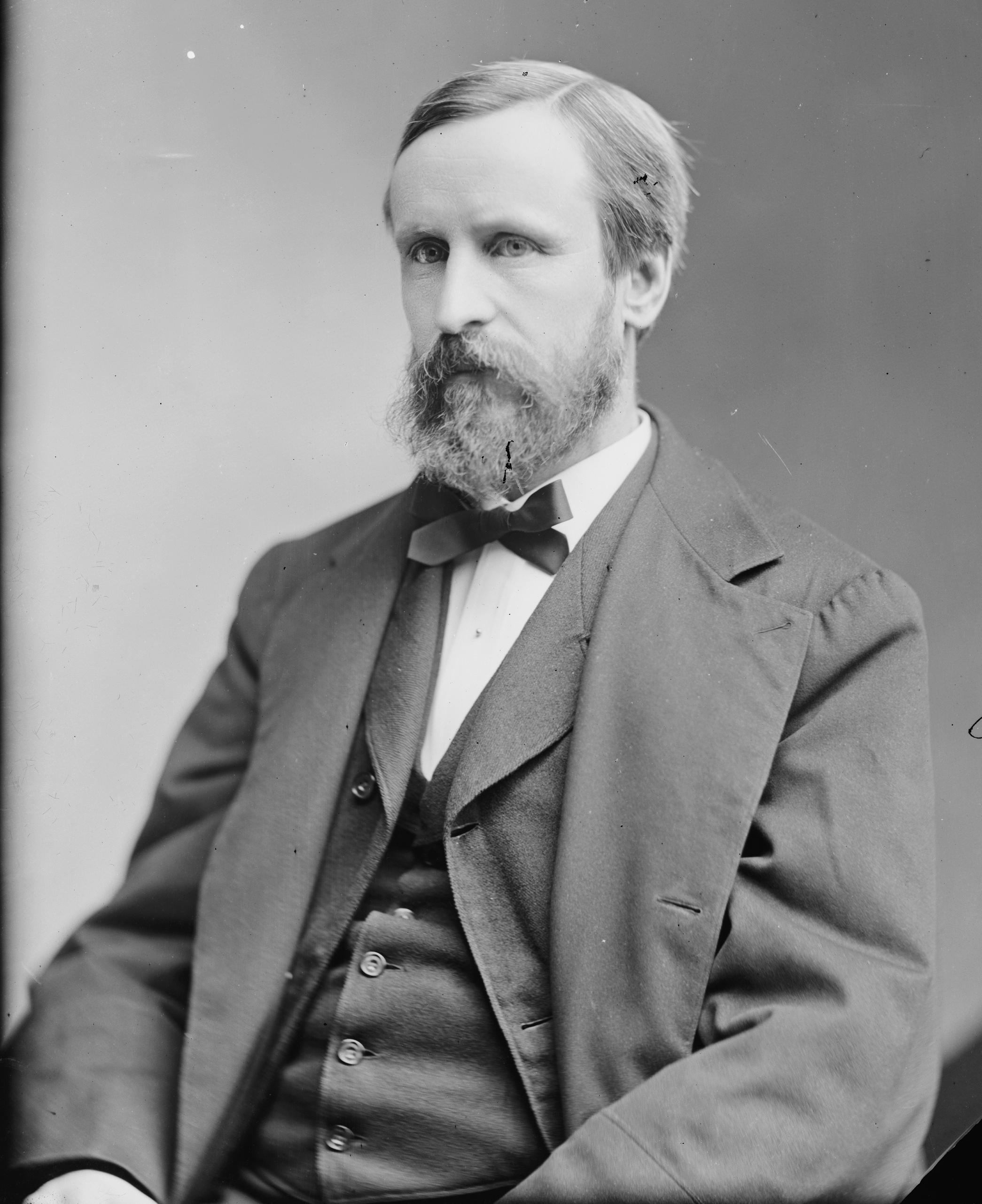
Mead, between 1865 and 1880

Larkin Goldsmith Mead, Jr. (January 3, 1835 – October 15, 1910) was an American sculptor who worked in a neoclassical style.

== Career ==
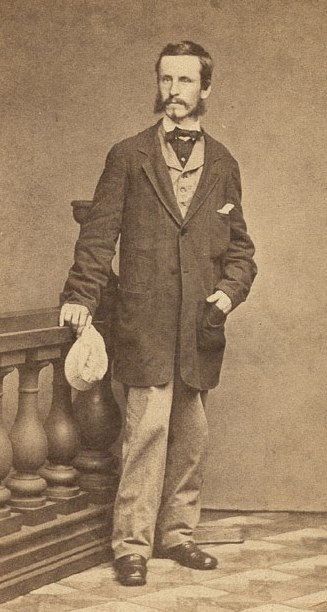
Mead, circa 1862

He was born at Chesterfield, New Hampshire, the son of a prominent lawyer. A colossal snowman constructed by the young Mead was reported by the local press. He became a pupil of sculptor Henry Kirke Brown, (1853–1855). He worked as an illustrator for Harper's Weekly during the early part of the American Civil War, and was at the front for six months with the Army of the Potomac. In 1862–1865, he traveled to Italy, working for a time in Florence, and also spending part of the time attached to the United States consulate at Venice, where William Dean Howells, his brother-in-law, was diplomatic consul. He married in Venice. He returned to America in 1865, but subsequently returned to Italy, where he lived in Florence until his death.

His first important work was a statue of Agriculture, designed to top the dome of the Vermont Statehouse at Montpelier, Vermont. This work proved so successful that he was soon commissioned to sculpt a statue of Ethan Allen for the Statehouse portico.

Other principal works include: the granite and bronze Lincoln Tomb, a sculptured mausoleum to President Abraham Lincoln in Springfield, Illinois; Ethan Allen (1876), National Statuary Hall, United States Capitol, Washington, DC; a heroic marble, Mississippi – The Father of Waters, Minneapolis City Hall; Triumph of Ceres, made for the World's Columbian Exposition, Chicago, Illinois, 1893; and a large bust of Lincoln in the Hall of Inscriptions at the Vermont Statehouse.

His brother William Rutherford Mead (1846–1928) was a well-known architect, the Mead of McKim, Mead, and White.

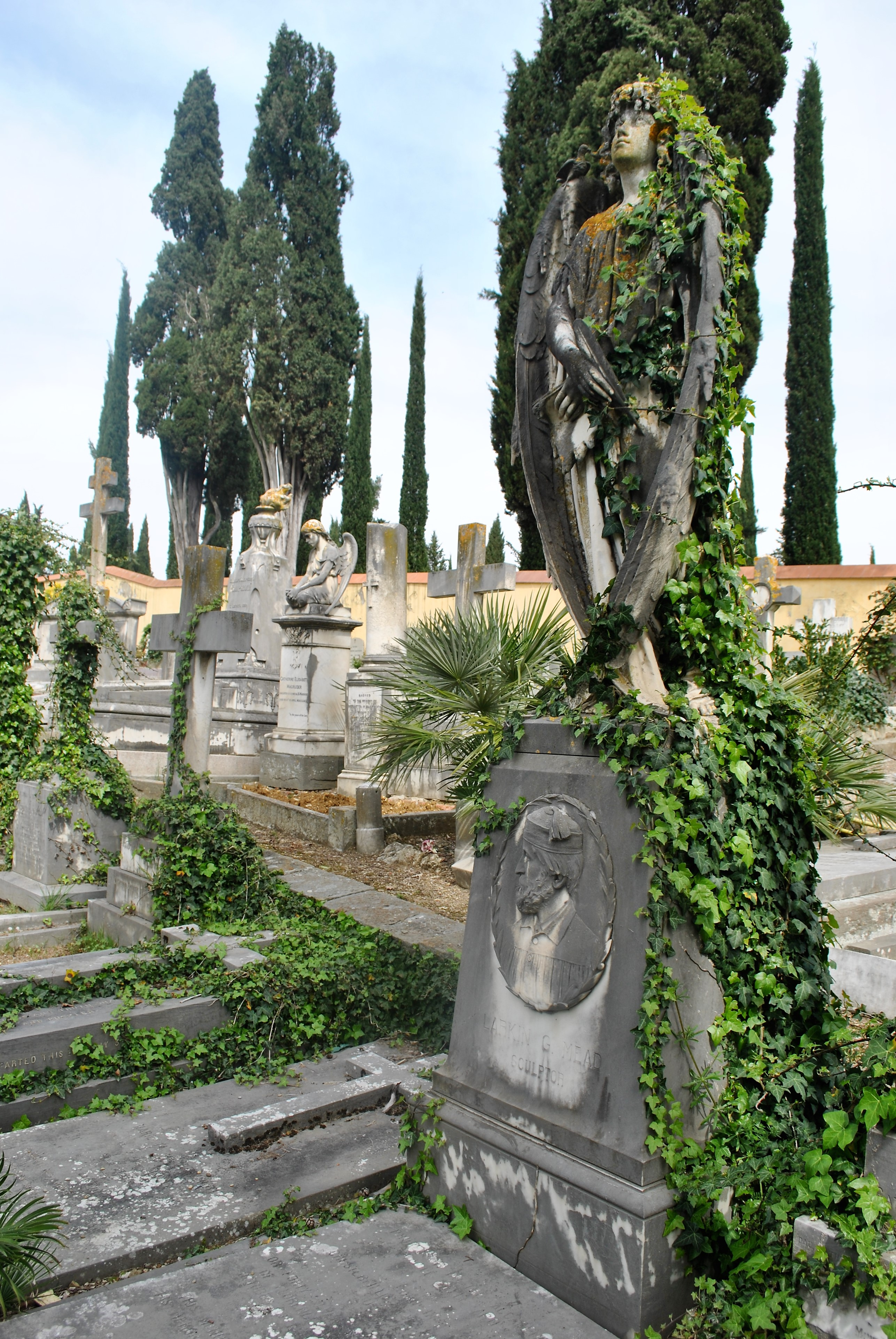
Cimitero degli Allori, Larkin Goldsmith Mead

He is buried in the Cimitero Evangelico degli Allori in the southern suburb of Florence, Galluzzo (Italy).

== Selected works ==
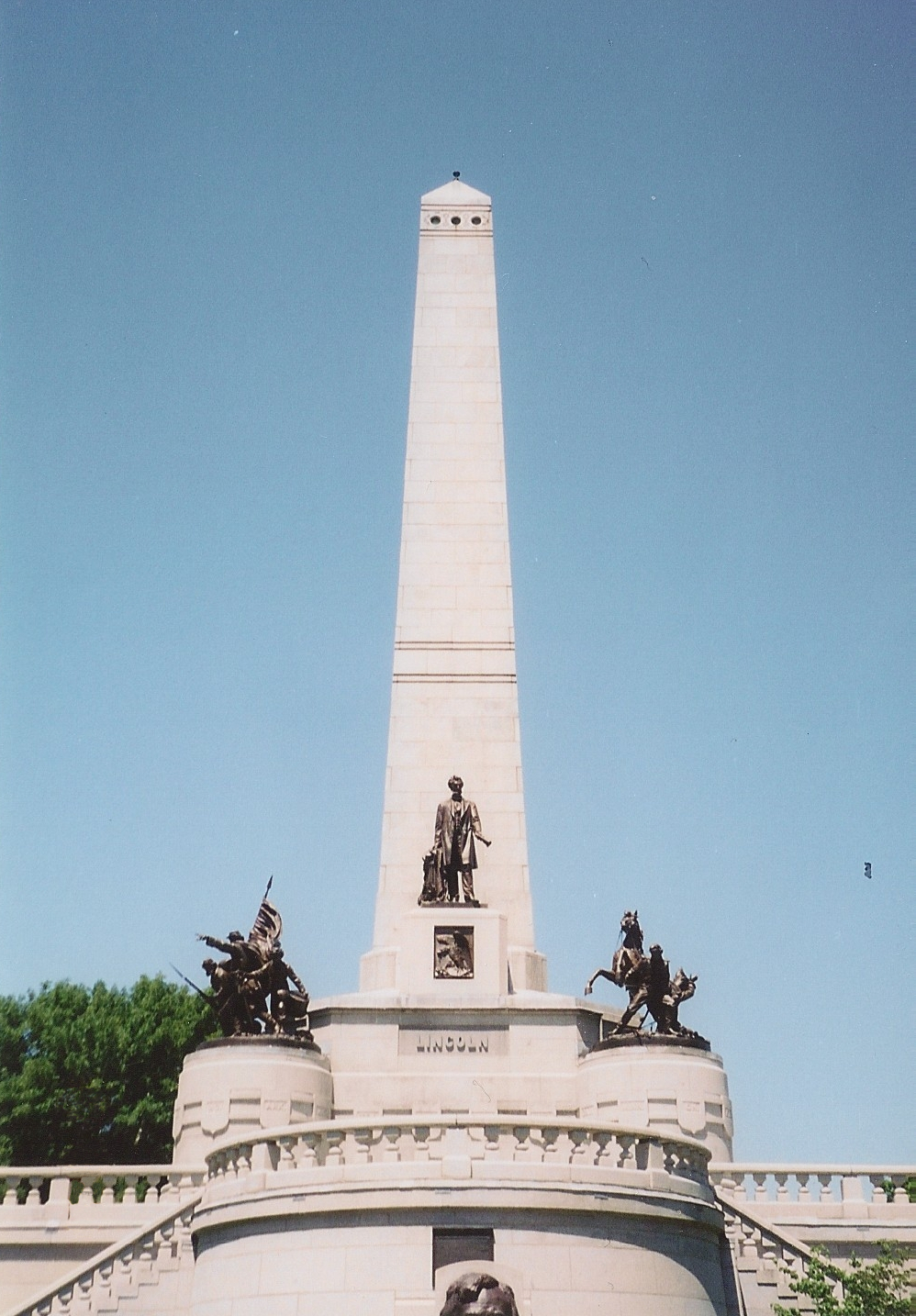
Abraham Lincoln's Tomb (ca. 1870–83), Springfield, Illinois

- Recording Angel, marble, 1855. A replica of this adorns Mead's grave in Florence, Italy.
- Agriculture (or Ceres), gilded wood, atop Vermont Statehouse dome, Montpelier, Vermont, 1858, replaced with a copy 1938.
- Ethan Allen, marble, by main entrance to Vermont Statehouse, Montpelier, Vermont, 1858–61, replaced with a copy 1941.
- Bust of General George McClellan, unlocated, 1862.
- Echo, marble, Smithsonian American Art Museum, Washington, DC, ca. 1862–63. Replicas of this are at the Boston Public Library, the Corcoran Gallery of Art, and the Telfair Academy of Arts and Sciences.
- Bust of Venezia, marble, Metropolitan Museum of Art, New York City, 1865–66. This is believed to be a portrait of Mead's wife.
- Returned Soldier, Italian marble, Connecticut Veterans Home, Rocky Hill, Connecticut, 1865-67. A replica of this is at the Chrysler Museum of Art.
- America, marble, atop Soldiers' Monument, Courthouse Park, St. Johnsbury, Vermont, 1866–68.
- Thought, marble, Bangor Public Library, Bangor, Maine, 1868.
- Columbus's Last Appeal to Queen Isabella, California State Capitol, Sacramento, California, 1868–71. Removed in 2020 as a result of the George Floyd and BLM protests. List of monuments and memorials removed during the George Floyd protests.
- Bust of Abraham Lincoln, Hall of Inscriptions, Vermont Statehouse, Montpelier, Vermont, ca. 1871. A study for Mead's statue at the Lincoln Tomb.
- Ethan Allen, marble, National Statuary Hall Collection, United States Capitol, Washington, DC, 1876. A replica of this is at Fort Ticonderoga in Ticonderoga, New York.
- Bas-relief Portrait of Henry Wadsworth Longfellow, 1883.
- Bas-relief of The Inauguration of George Washington as First President, bronze, ca. 1889.
- The Triumph of Ceres (pedimental sculpture), north portico of the Agricultural Building, World's Columbian Exposition, Chicago, Illinois, 1893 (destroyed). His brother, William Rutherford Mead, was the building's architect.
- The Return of Proserpine From the Realms of Pluto, unlocated, ca. 1893. Exhibited at the World's Columbian Exposition.
- Ione, marble, Bangor Public Library, Bangor, Maine, ca. 1897.
- Leland Stanford and Family, bronze, Stanford University, Stanford, California, 1899.
- Mississippi – The Father of Waters, marble, Minneapolis City Hall, Minneapolis, Minnesota, 1903–06.
- La Contadinella (The Country Girl), unlocated.
- Sappho, unlocated.
- [Bas-relief?] Portrait of John Hay, bronze, unlocated.
- [Bas-relief?] Portrait of William Dean Howells, bronze, unlocated.
- [Bas-relief?] Portrait of Henry James, bronze, unlocated.

=== Lincoln Tomb, Springfield, Illinois ===
- United States Coat of Arms, bronze, ca. 1870.
- Statue of Abraham Lincoln, bronze, 1871–72.
- The Infantry Group, bronze, 1874–76.
- The Naval Group, bronze, 1874–77.
- The Artillery Group, bronze, 1882.
- The Cavalry Group, bronze, 1883.
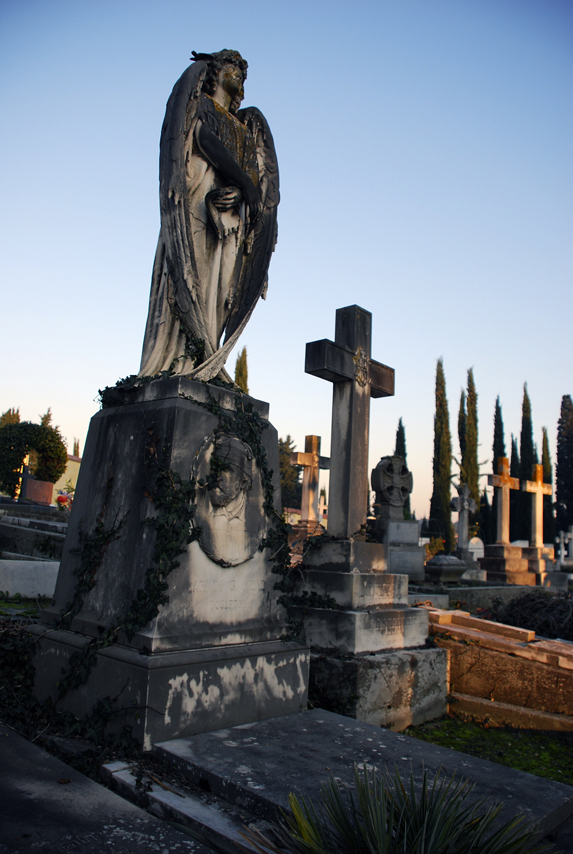
Recording Angel (1855), at Mead's grave in Florence, Italy

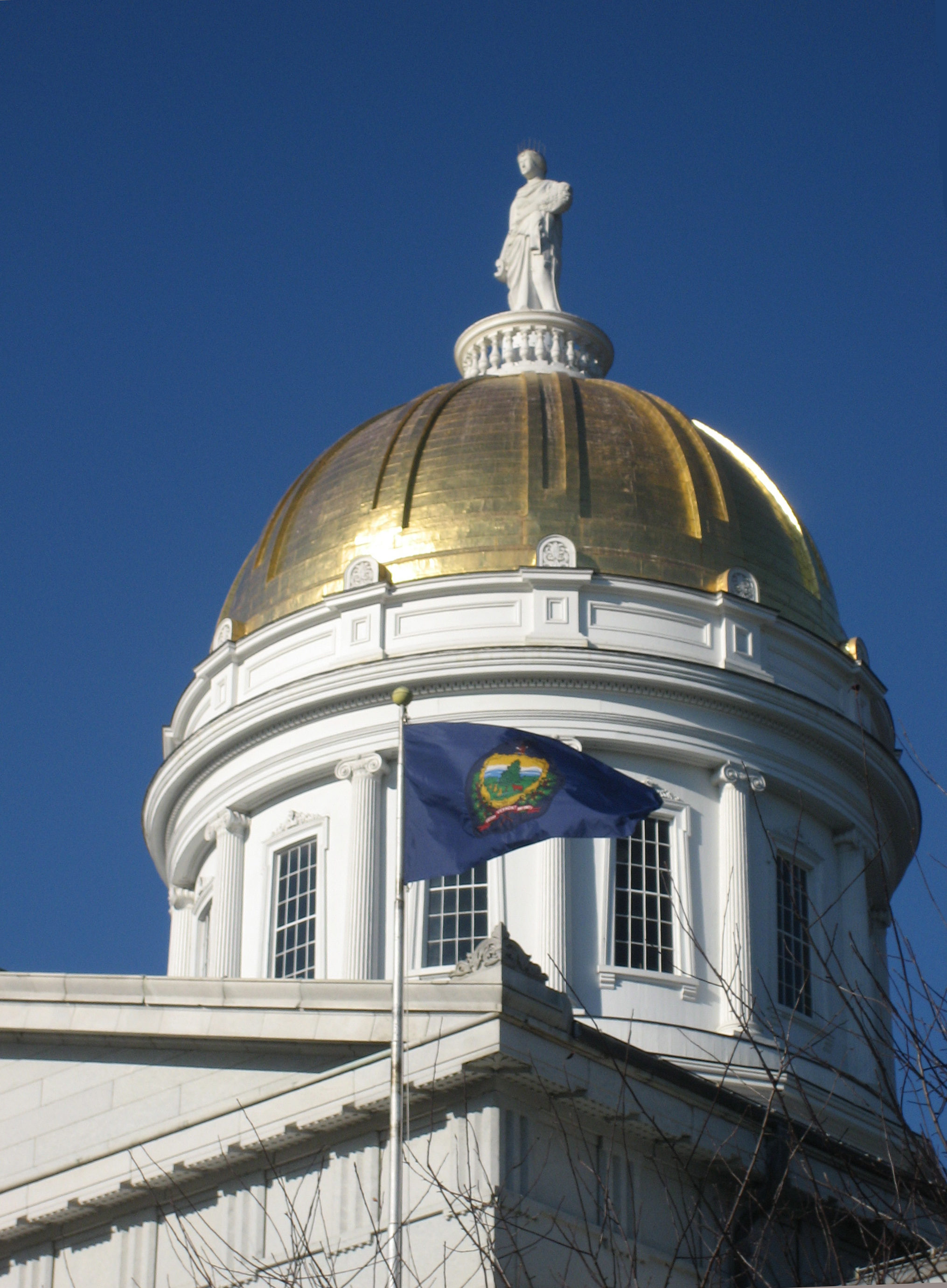
Agriculture, atop the Vermont Statehouse. Copy of Larkin's 1858 original.

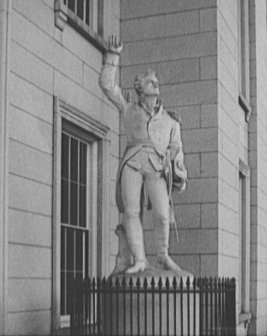
Ethan Allen (1858–61), by main entrance to Vermont Statehouse in 1904

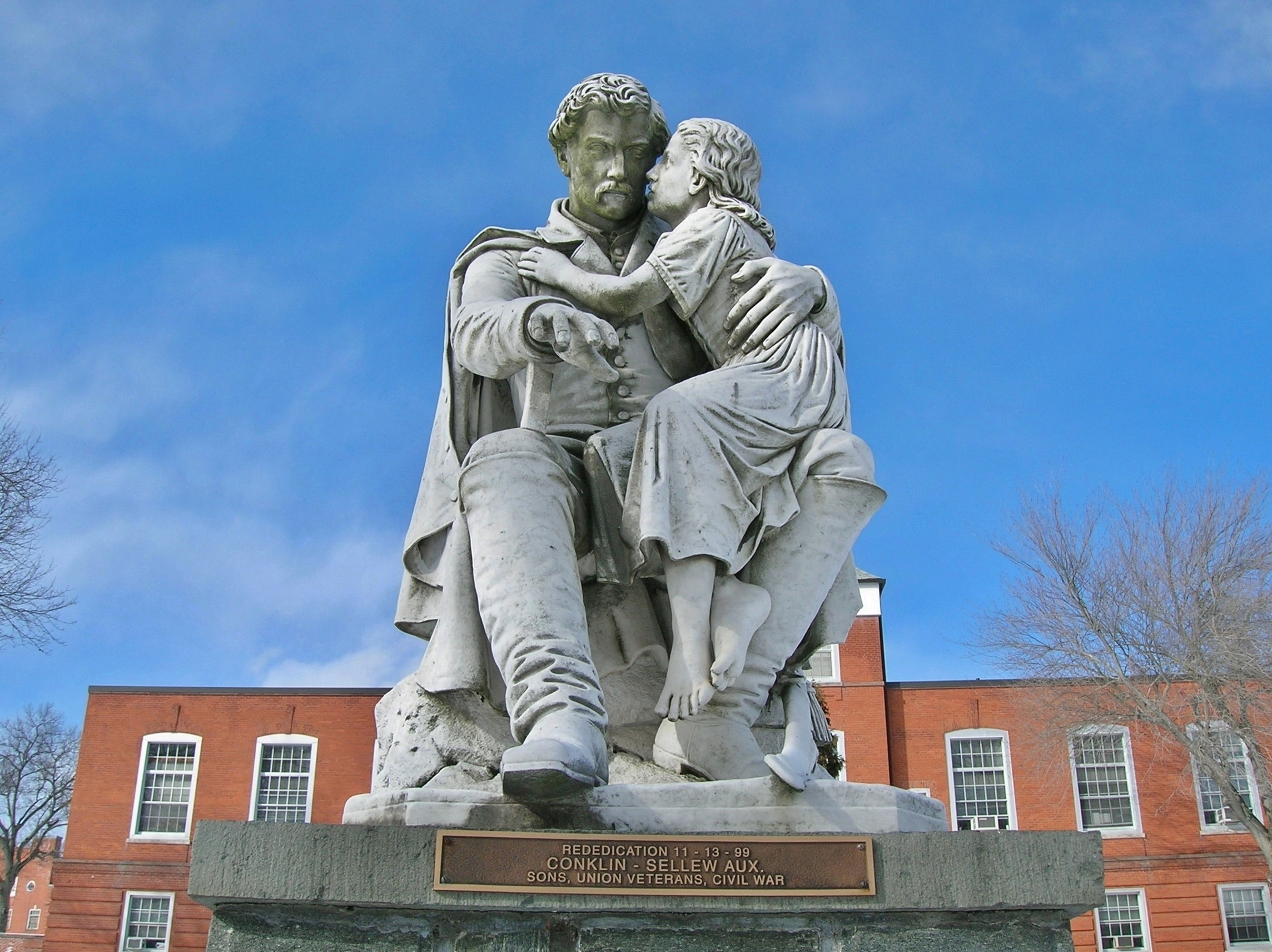
Returned Soldier (1867), Connecticut Veterans Home, Rocky Hill, Connecticut

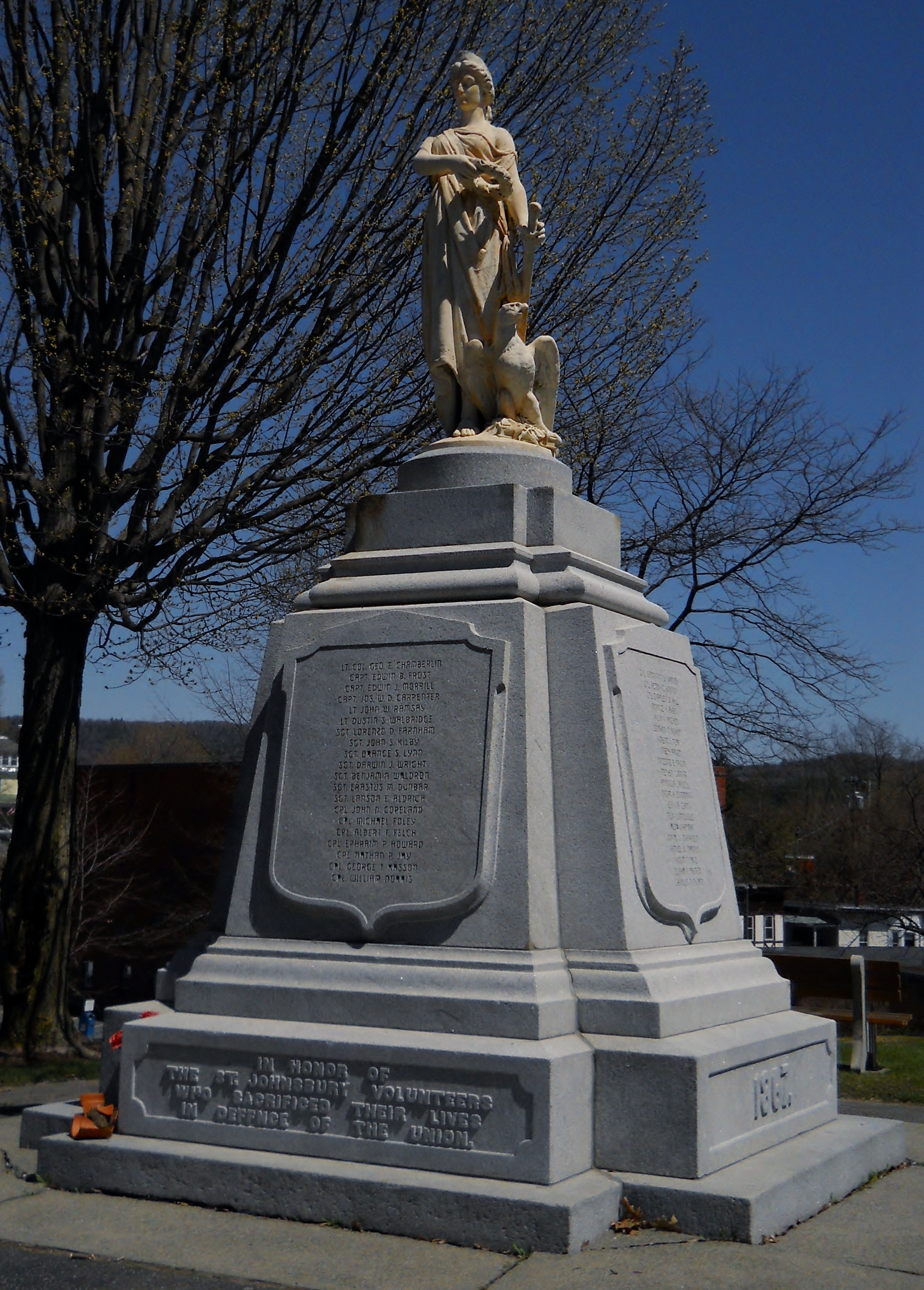
America (1866–68), Soldiers Monument, St. Johnsbury, Vermont

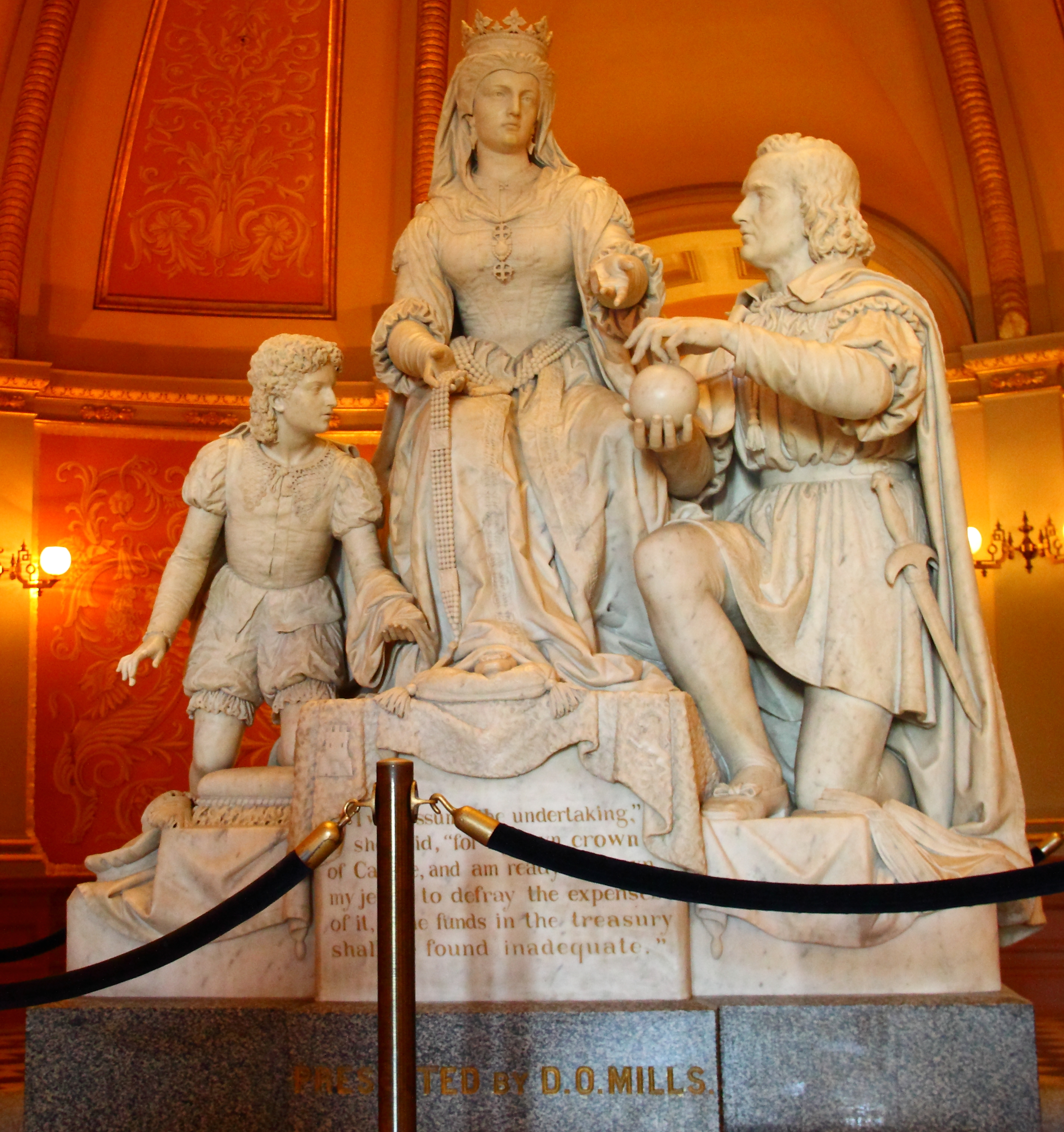
Columbus' Last Appeal to Queen Isabella (1868–71), California State Capitol, Sacramento, California

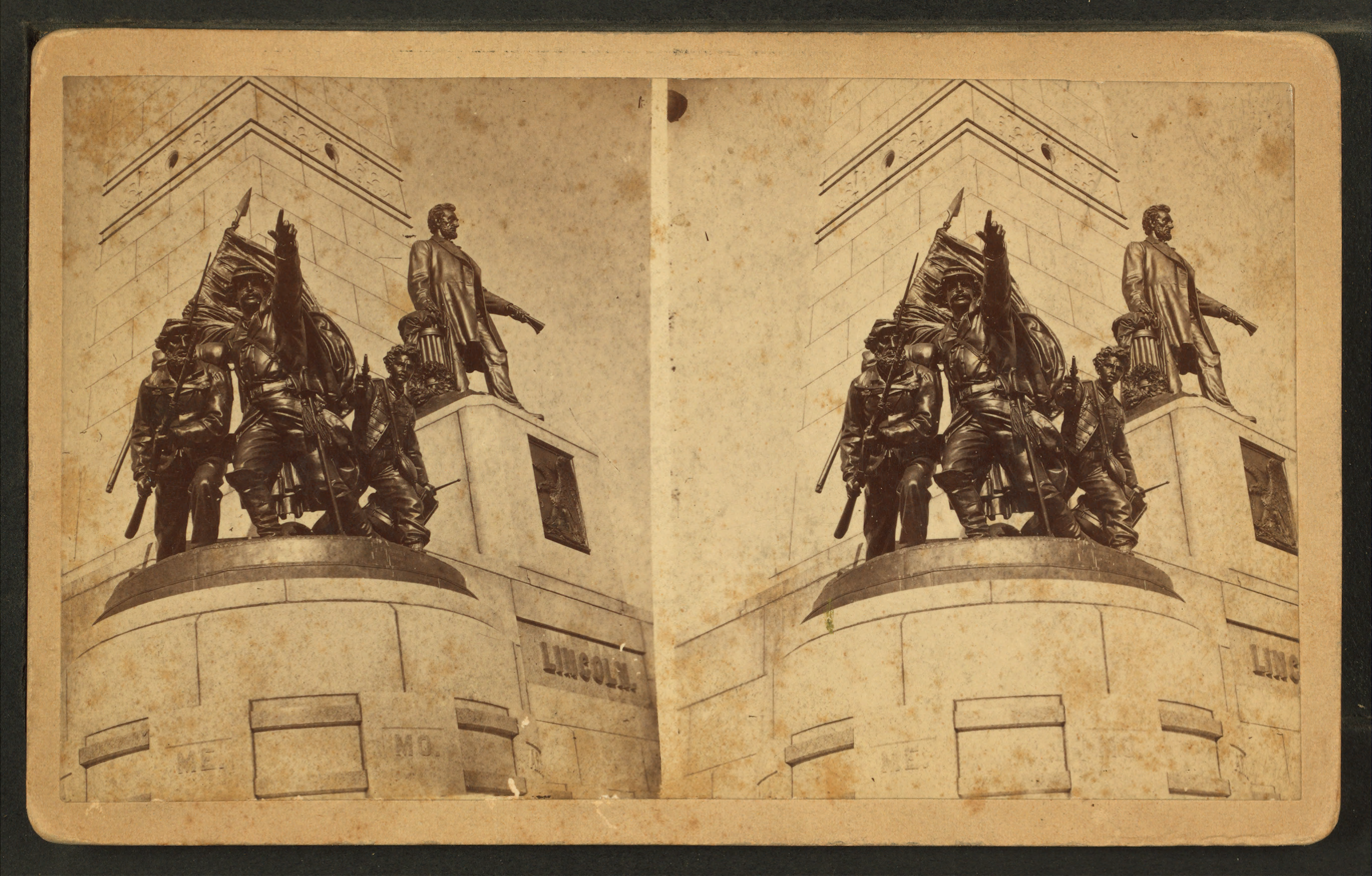
Infantry Group (1874–76) and Lincoln Statue (1871–72), Lincoln Tomb

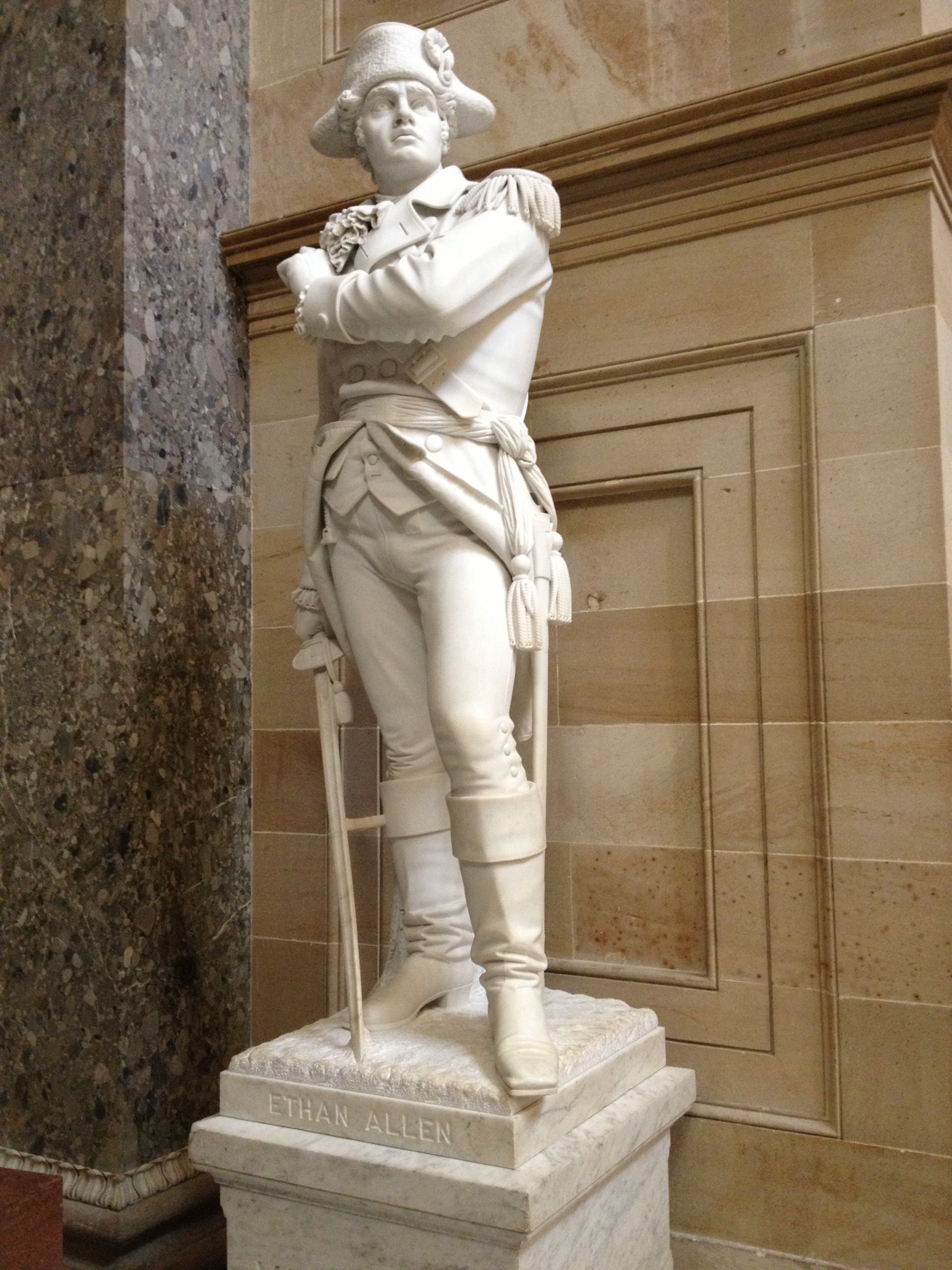
Ethan Allen (1876), United States Capitol, Washington, DC

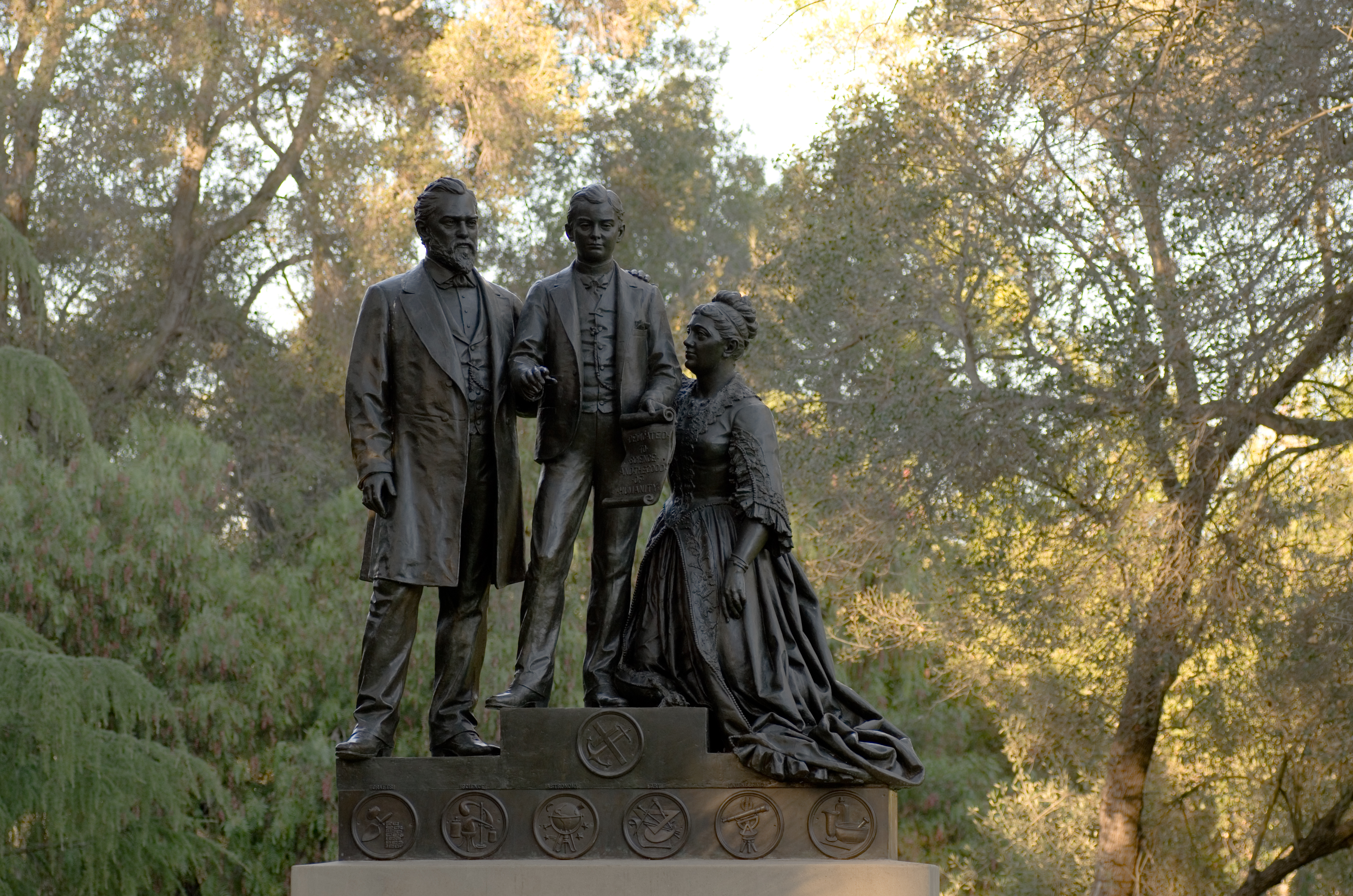
Leland Stanford and Family (1899), Stanford University, Stanford, California

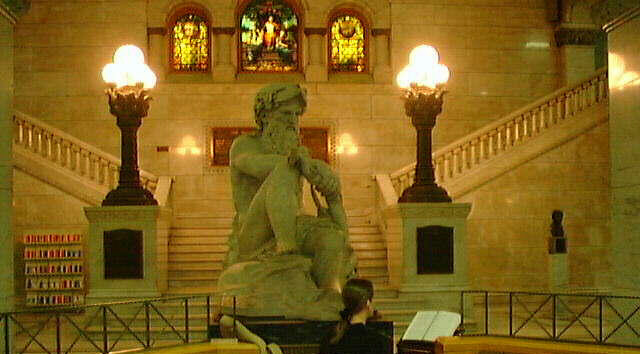
Mississippi – The Father of Waters (1903–06), Minneapolis City Hall, Minneapolis, Minnesota

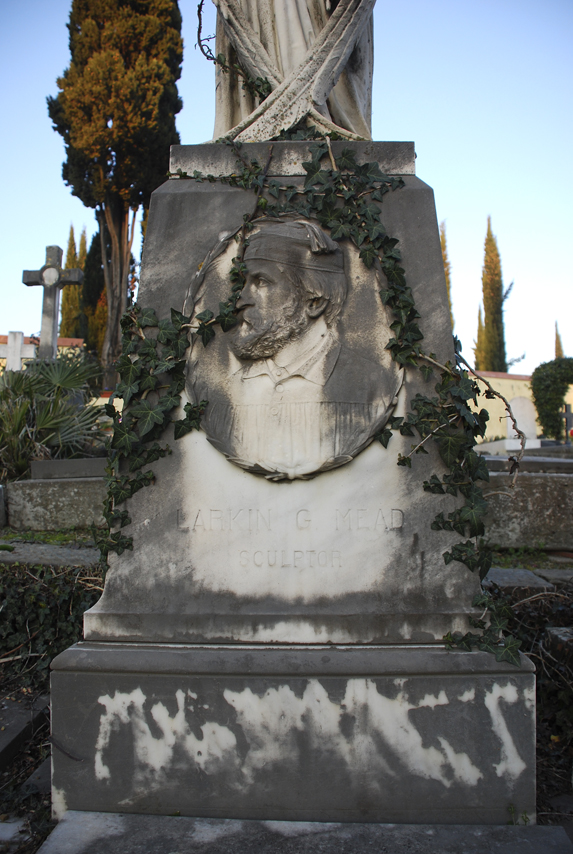
Bas-relief self-portrait, at Mead's grave in Florence, Italy

== Sources ==
- rbhayes.org: Seventh Generation
