= Columbus' Last Appeal to Queen Isabella =

Sculpture by Larkin Goldsmith Mead

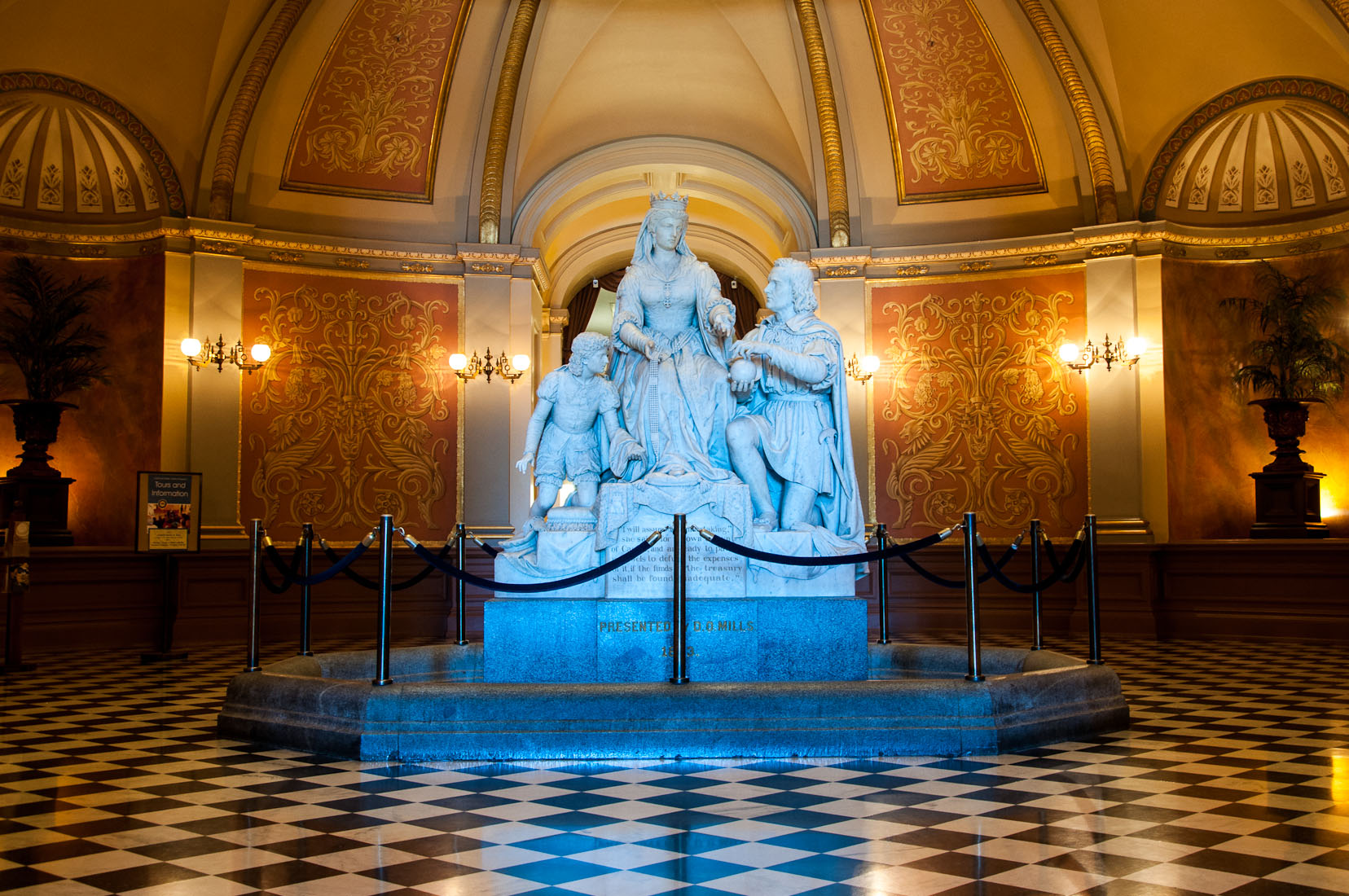
- The statuary group in 2014
- Subject: Christopher Columbus; Isabella I of Castile
- Location: California State Capitol, Sacramento, California, U.S.

Columbus' Last Appeal to Queen Isabella is a statuary group which was previously installed in the California State Capitol in Sacramento in 1883. It was the work of Larkin Goldsmith Mead (1835-1910). The statues were removed in 2020.

== See also ==
- List of monuments and memorials to Christopher Columbus
- List of monuments and memorials removed during the George Floyd protests
