= Friends of the Vermont State House =

Non-profit corporation

The Friends of the Vermont State House is a non-profit corporation dedicated to the restoration, conservation, and interpretation of Vermont's historic State House, the seat of the U.S. state of Vermont's legislative branch of government. The organization works closely with the Vermont General Assembly, the Curator of State Buildings, the Office of the Sergeant at Arms, and other government officials to maintain the historic and symbolic dignity of the building. Membership is open to all, and the organization is self-governing.

== Mission statement ==
The Friends of the Vermont State House describes it mission as "a non-profit corporation dedicated to the fulfillment of the Capitol building's full potential as the structure of first importance to Vermont. To accomplish this, the Friends focus on conservation and restoration of the Capitol's historic integrity and promotion of public appreciation of the building and its collections. We work in close cooperation with the Legislature and government officials to ensure that the historic and symbolic dignity of the building continues to enhance the vital continuing function it fills."

== Restoration guided by scholarship ==
In the early 1980s the Friends commissioned a master plan for the long-term restoration of the building. Research was undertaken using historic documents, photographs, stereoscope views, drawings, and plans for the 1859 building. The Friends funded a curator and tour guide coordinator, both positions the state government came to realize deserved state funding. The master plan examined the whole building through its history, giving consideration to the range of period styles various rooms had undergone over time. Much of the initial work was towards negating the results of a 1970 renovation that paid little attention to historic scholarship. As the plan emerged, a complex schedule based on the building's heavy use during the legislative session needed to be negotiated. Over the course of twenty years, a dramatic transformation has occurred. The two main legislative chambers have been restored to their 1859 appearance. Period furniture upholstered in a vinyl product in the 1970s were restored using authentic silk satin, silk velvet, and horsehair fabrics. Complex period carpeting was rewoven and installed, chandeliers and sconces were restored, and new drapery based on old photographs were recreated and hung. Today, the Vermont State House shines; the New York Times has described it as being "like a Fabergé egg." Whereas the taxpayers may finance large ticket items, like new carpeting and restoration of plaster, the Friends help acquire special pieces with a history associated with the State House. Recently, the Friends acquired a c. 1858 bronze desk lamp with the sculptor Hiram Powers' figure of the Greek Slave cast in ormolu. The Friends have recently published a new book, "Intimate Grandeur," documenting the history of the State House.

== Funding ==
The Friends of the Vermont State House have raised and spent well over a million dollars on the building's restoration. Funding comes from membership; individual contributions; sale of books and items in their gift shop, "Under the Dome"; and through special events, many held in the State House.

== Interpretation ==
Through special events, and lectures, but more often through on-site interpretation by volunteer tour guides, the Friends help tourists, local residents, and sometimes even members of the General Assembly, better know and appreciate the State House. The Friends have brought historic preservation architects, artisans and crafts people, historians, musicians, and writers to the State House for public events. Volunteer tour guides take groups through the State House and show the real life workings of Vermont's seat of government.
