= Vermont State House =

American state capitol building

- U.S. National Register of Historic Places
- U.S. National Historic Landmark
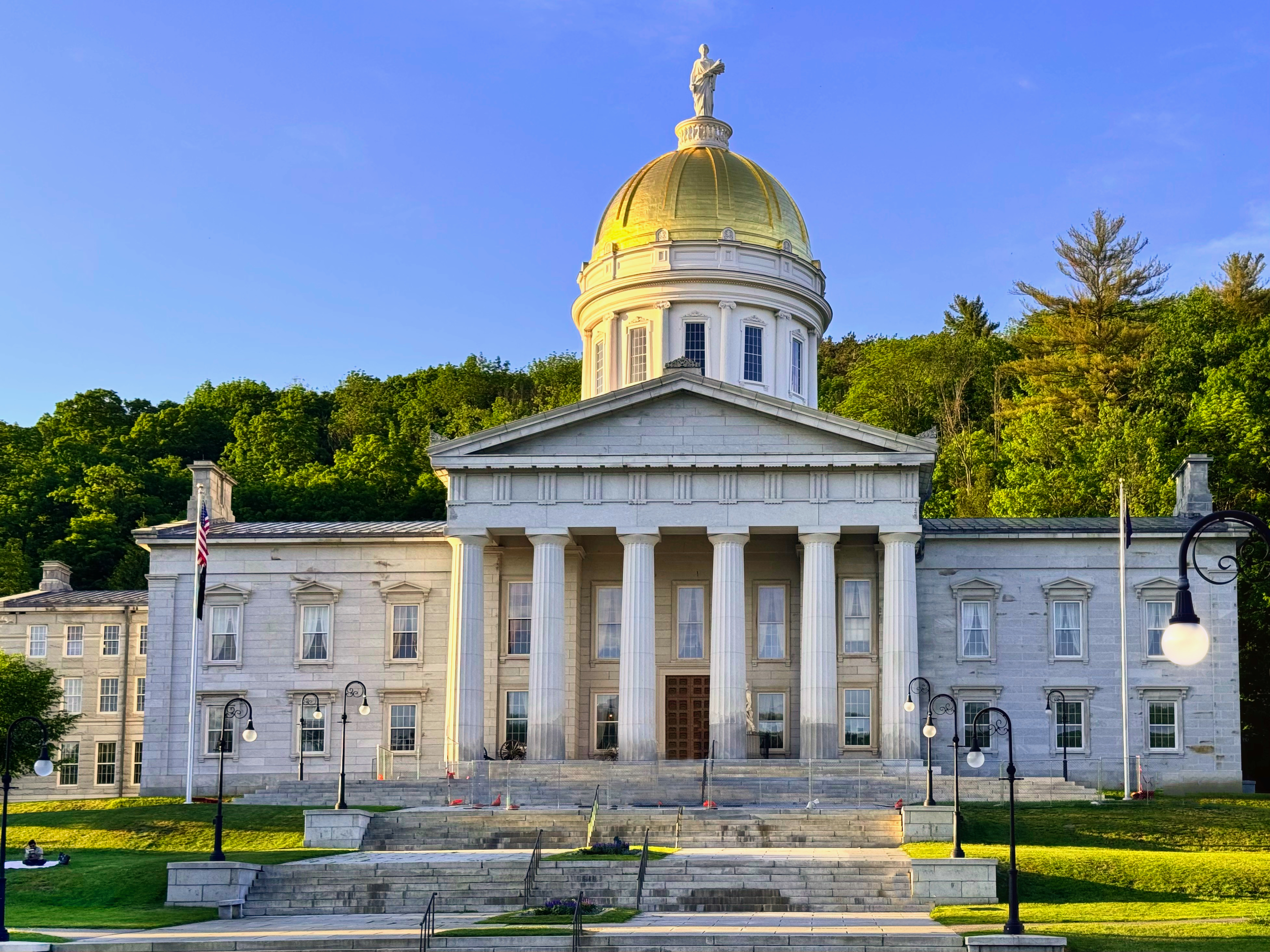
- The State House in June 2024

- Location within Vermont Location within the United States
- Location: Montpelier, Vermont, U.S.
- Coordinates: 44°15′45″N 72°34′50″W
- Built: 1833; 193 years ago
- Architects: Ammi Burnham Young; Thomas Silloway
- Architectural style: Greek Revival
- NRHP reference No.: 70000739

Significant dates
- Added to NRHP: December 30, 1970
- Designated NHL: December 30, 1970

The Vermont State House, located in Montpelier, is the state capitol of the U.S. state of Vermont. It is the seat of the Vermont General Assembly. The current Greek Revival structure is the third building on the same site to be used as the State House. Designed by Thomas Silloway in 1857 and 1858, it was occupied in 1859. It is the smallest state house in the United States.

A careful restoration of the Vermont State House began in the early 1980s led by curator David Schütz and the Friends of the Vermont State House, a citizens' advisory committee. The general style of the building is Neoclassical and Greek Revival and is furnished in American Empire, Renaissance Revival, and Rococo Revival styles. Some rooms have been restored to represent latter-19th-century styles including the "Aesthetic Movement" style.

Since 1994, Buildings and General Services Architect Tricia Harper has been responsible for design and construction for the restoration and renovation project of the building and its grounds.

The Vermont State House is located on State Street on the western edge of downtown Montpelier, a block north of the Winooski River. Set against a wooded hillside (which was open pasture land earlier during much of its history), the building and its distinctive gold leaf dome are easily visible while approaching Montpelier, the smallest city to serve as capital of a U.S. state.

== History and architecture ==
=== Exterior facade and dome ===
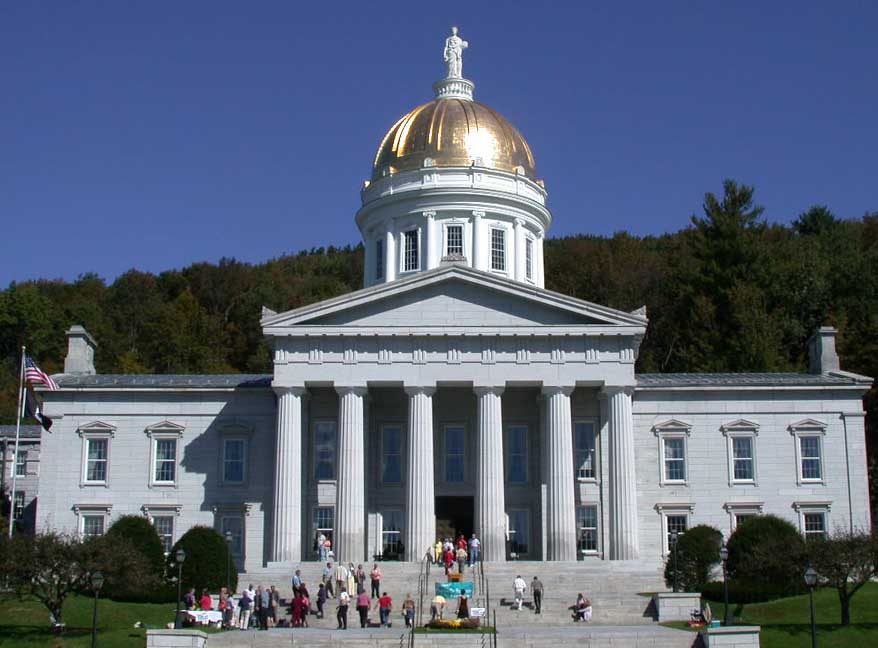
The Doric portico of the Vermont State House dates to Ammi B. Young's second 1833 state house.

The current structure was designed by architect Thomas Silloway (1828–1910) amplifying the design of an earlier structure designed by Ammi B. Young, (1798–1874) later supervising architect of the U.S. Treasury. The first State House built in 1808 by Sylvanus Baldwin was replaced by the current Vermont Supreme Court Building completed in 1918.

The prior edifice, known as the "Second State House", was constructed on the same site between 1833 and 1838. Young's structure was of a more reserved Greek Revival design based upon the Temple of Hephaestus in Athens. Gray Barre granite is used for the two-story cruciform design with a Doric portico and a low saucer dome echoing William Thornton's earliest design for the United States Capitol. Young's structure was almost entirely destroyed by a fire in January 1857. Silloway was able to salvage the Doric portico, as well as portions of the granite walls. Silloway added an additional bay of windows on each side of the central portico and increased the height of the dome (copper on a wood substructure) to its current level. This may have been done to imitate the increased height of the new Capitol dome in Washington designed by Thomas U. Walter which was being constructed during the same time.

The dome and roofs were originally painted a dark terracotta red to suggest Tuscan tile. The dome was not gilded until the early 20th century, when many states did so as a part of the Colonial Revival style.

==== Ceres ====
Ceres

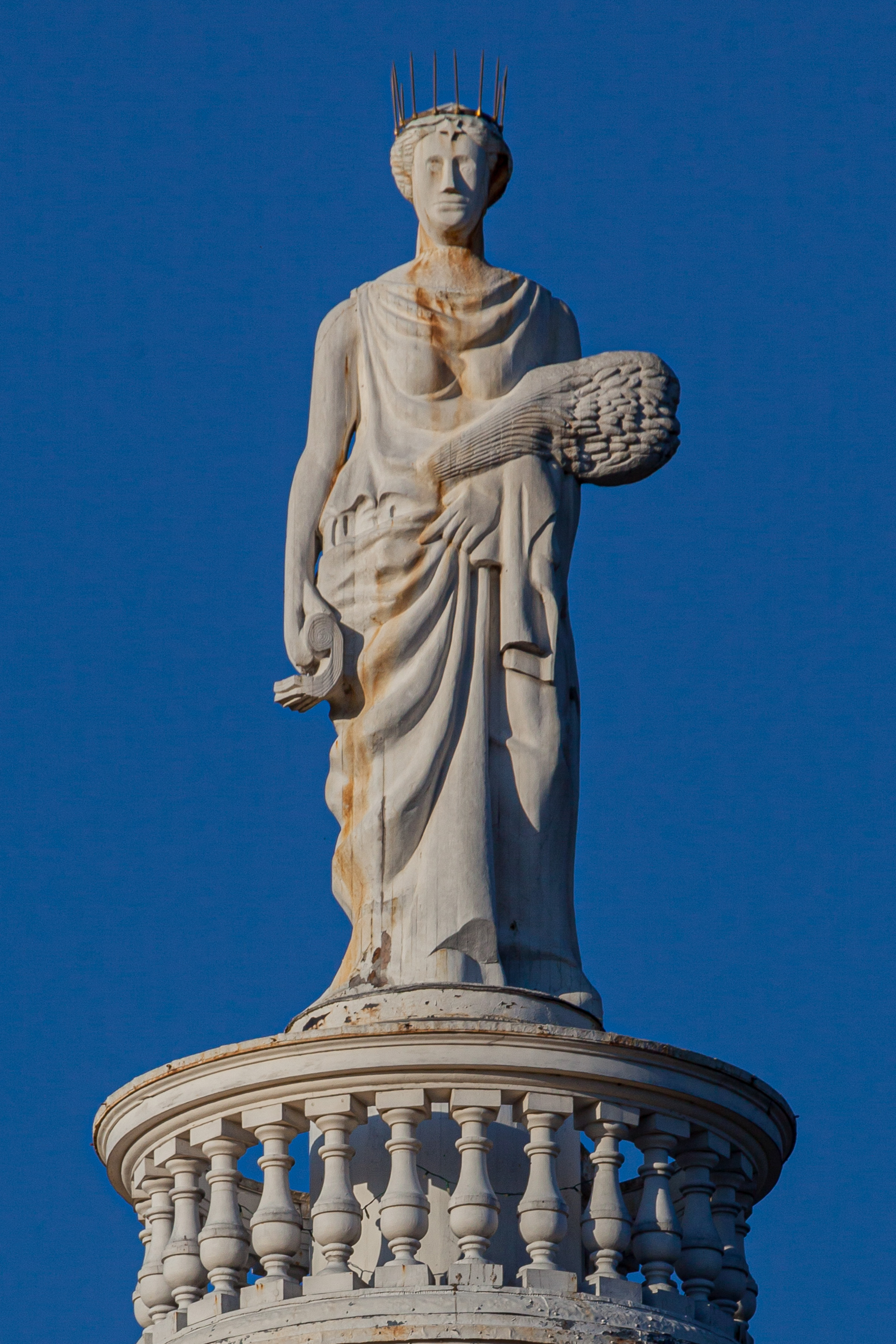
Dwinell, 1938-2018

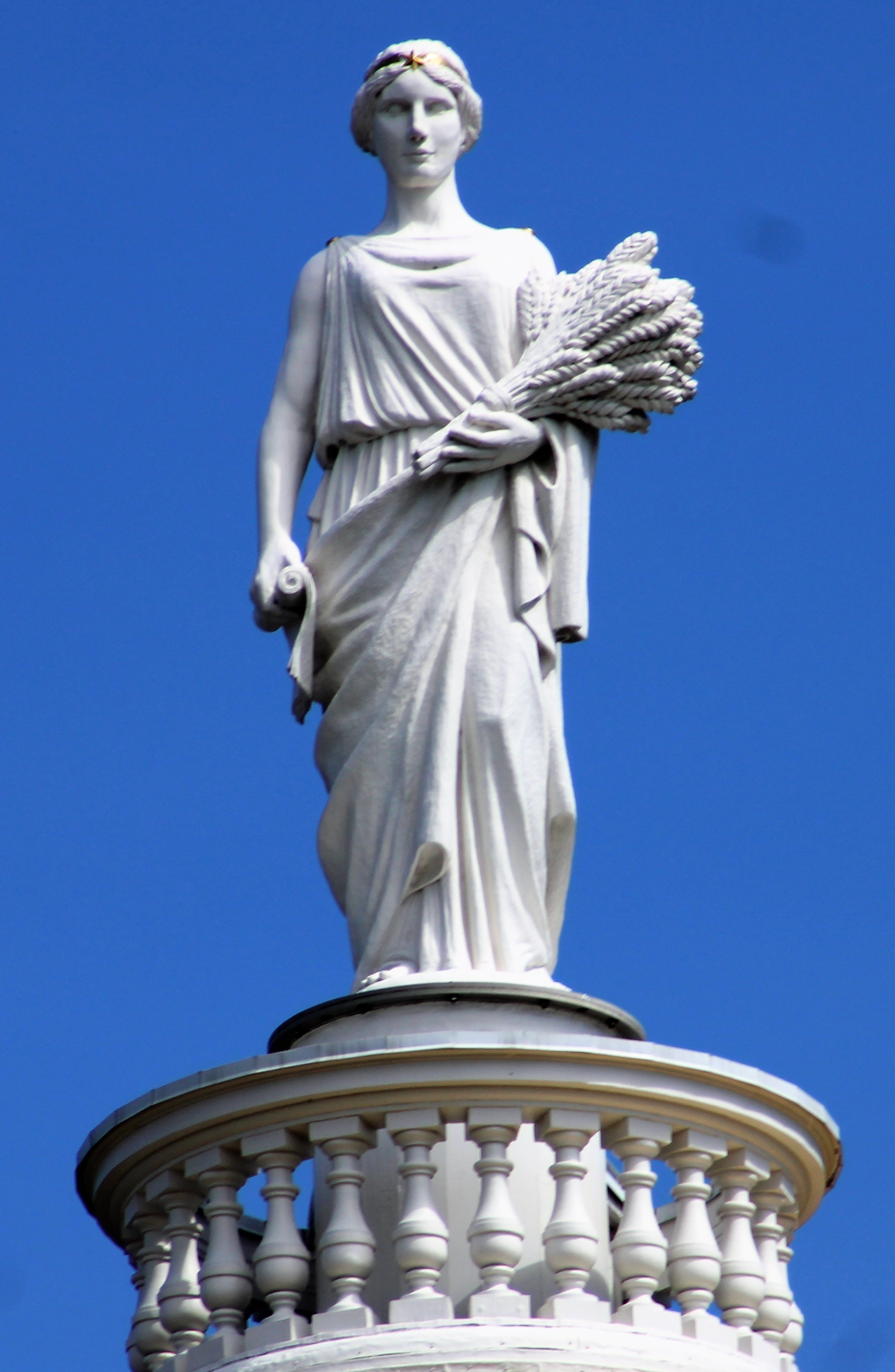
Williams and Miller, 2018-

The dome is topped by a statue named Agriculture, a representation of Ceres, an ancient Roman goddess of agriculture. The original statue was carved by Vermont artist Larkin Goldsmith Mead, who also carved the large bust of Lincoln in the Hall of Inscriptions on the State House's ground floor. This statue was installed in 1858. When the first statue rotted out a replacement based on Mead's original was carved in 1938 by then 87-year-old Dwight Dwinell, Sergeant-at-Arms (in Vermont, this official position is similar in nature to the White House Chief Usher). In April 2018, the second statue was removed. The current statue was carved by Chris Miller out of a laminated block of mahogany and was based on a one-quarter scale model created by Jerry Williams, which was also based on the original 1858 statue.

The Doric portico, the main ceremonial entrance, houses a granite statue of Ethan Allen. Ethan Allen was a founder of Vermont and commander of the Green Mountain Boys, an early Vermont military infantry active during the Vermont Republic (1777–1791). The statue was carved by Aristide Piccini in 1941 to replace the original marble version carved by Larkin Goldsmith Mead in 1858. The architect Stanford White (1853–1906) considered Silloway's Vermont State House to be the finest example of the Greek Revival style in the United States.

=== Interiors, furnishings, and decorative arts ===
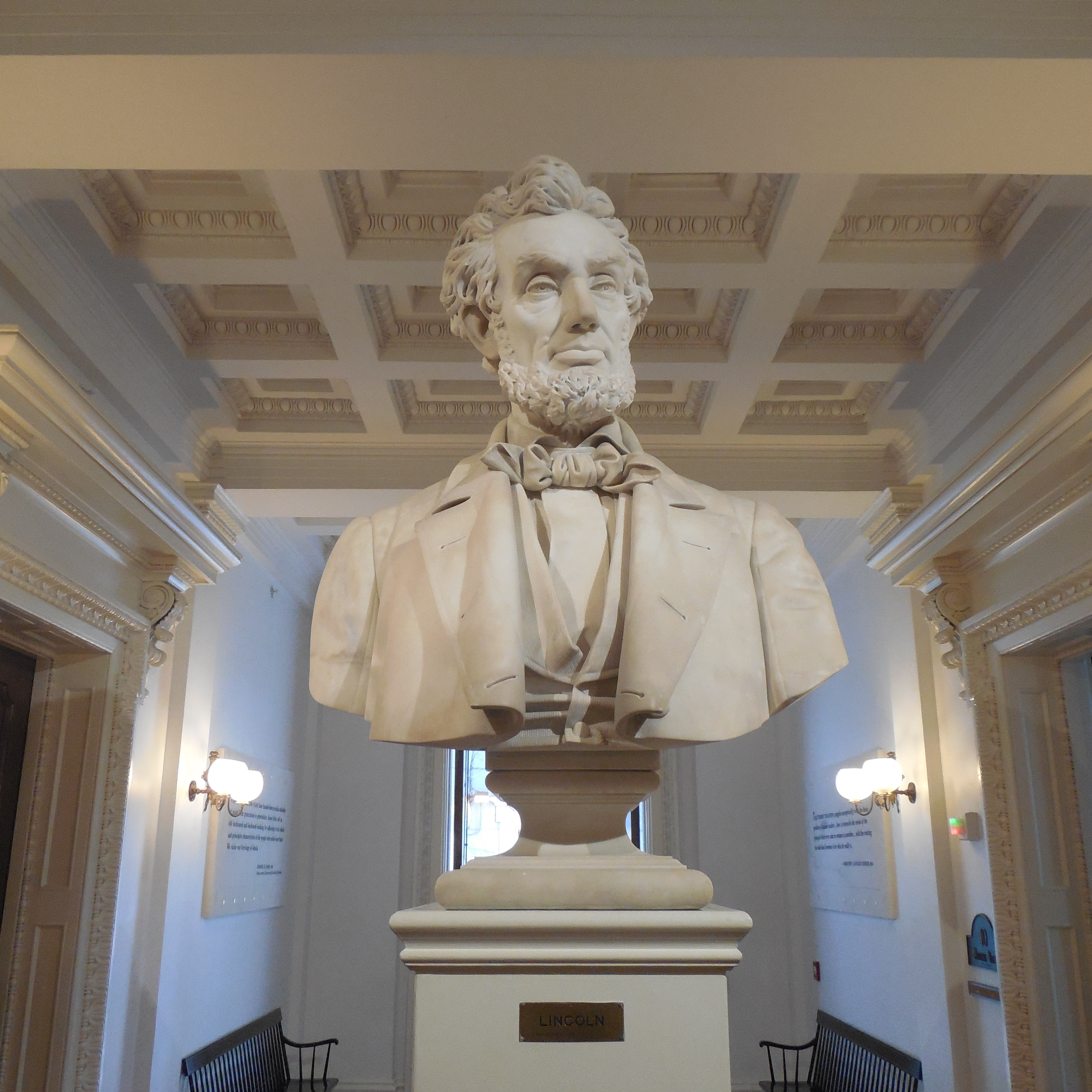
The bust of Abraham Lincoln within the Hall of Inscriptions was a study by Larkin Goldsmith Mead for a larger statue installed at the Lincoln Tomb.

The State House contains two primary floors accessible by a pair of circular stairways opening into the ground-floor Cross Hall. An elevator is also available. The Entrance Hall is of the Greek Ionic order and flanked by portraits of Presidents Calvin Coolidge and Chester A. Arthur, both native to Vermont. The tall double front doors were painted and then coated with a metallic powder to appear as bronze in 1859. The Entrance Hall contains a portrait of Montpelier native Admiral George Dewey on the bridge of his flagship during the Battle of Manila Bay. The Vermont State House does not have a rotunda, the dome being located almost directly above the ceiling of Representatives Hall on the second floor. The principal public room is the Hall of Inscriptions, a Doric pilastered corridor featuring eight monumental marble tablets incised with quotations about the distinct nature of Vermont's culture and heritage. The tablets quote the Vermont Constitution, Ethan Allen, Calvin Coolidge, George Aiken, Warren Austin, and Dorothy Canfield Fisher among others. Each tablet features fourteen gilded stars, representing Vermont's fourteen counties, the state's fourteen years as an independent republic, and being the fourteenth state to join the federal Union. The four corners of each tablet feature a sheath of grain, a detail found in the Great Seal of Vermont, designed by Ira Allen.

The ceremonial office of the Governor of Vermont, used during legislative sessions for meetings and bill-signings, is located in the second-floor west wing of the building. The Executive Chamber has been restored to its 1859 appearance with pediment hooded windows supported by Italianate-style brackets, and gilded Rococo Revival drapery cornices.

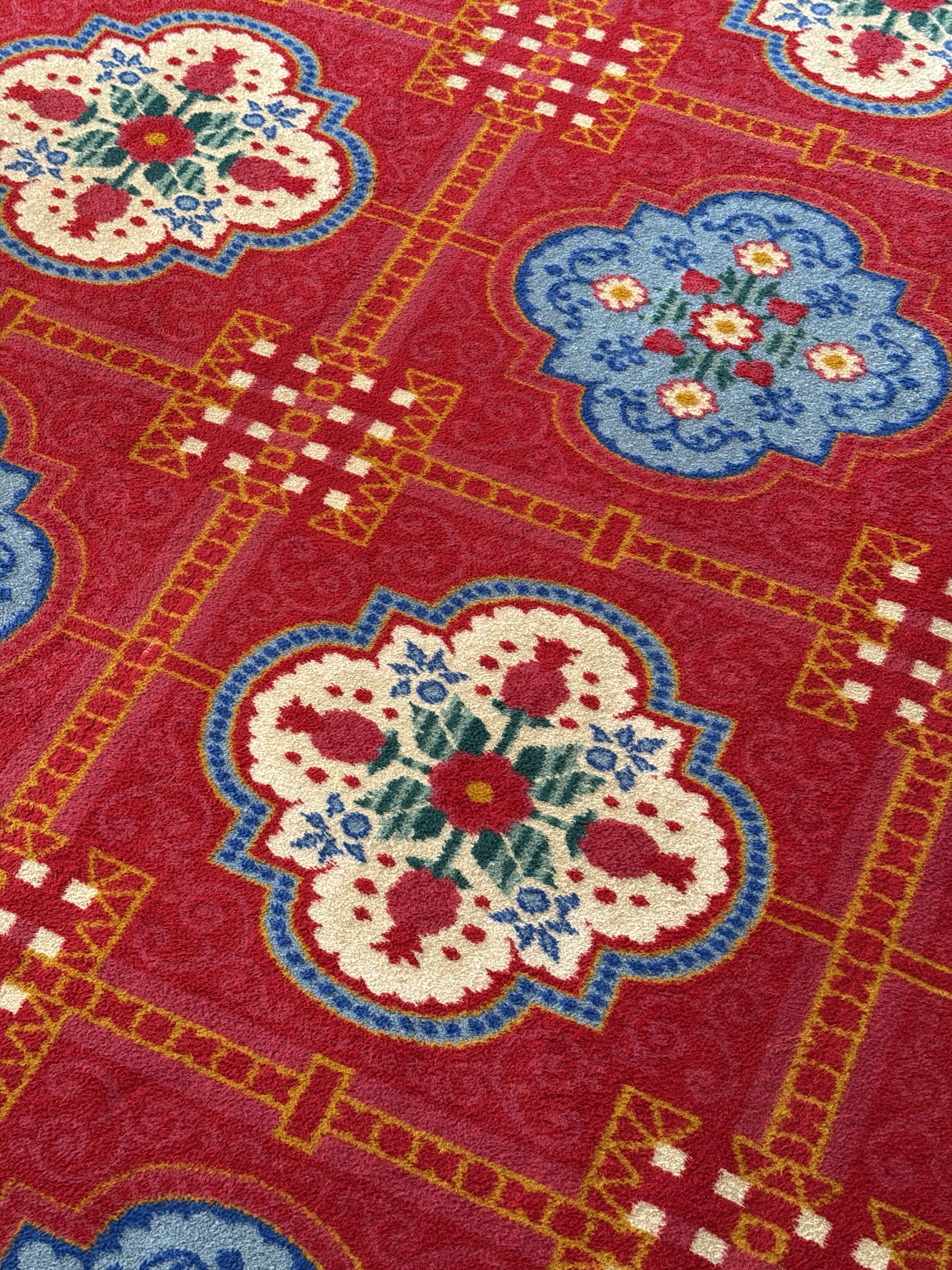
The carpet in the Office of the Governor

A Wilton style carpet colored crimson, azure blue and gold was rewoven as part of the restoration. The Vermont Governor's working office and private apartments are located nearby at The Pavilion, built in Second Empire style and located just east of the Vermont Supreme Court. Portraits of Vermont governors (including Howard Dean, who is shown in an idiosyncratic pose in a canoe amid a natural setting) are displayed through the first and second floors of the State House, the corridors of which are a sort of state portrait gallery, commemorating famous Vermonters.

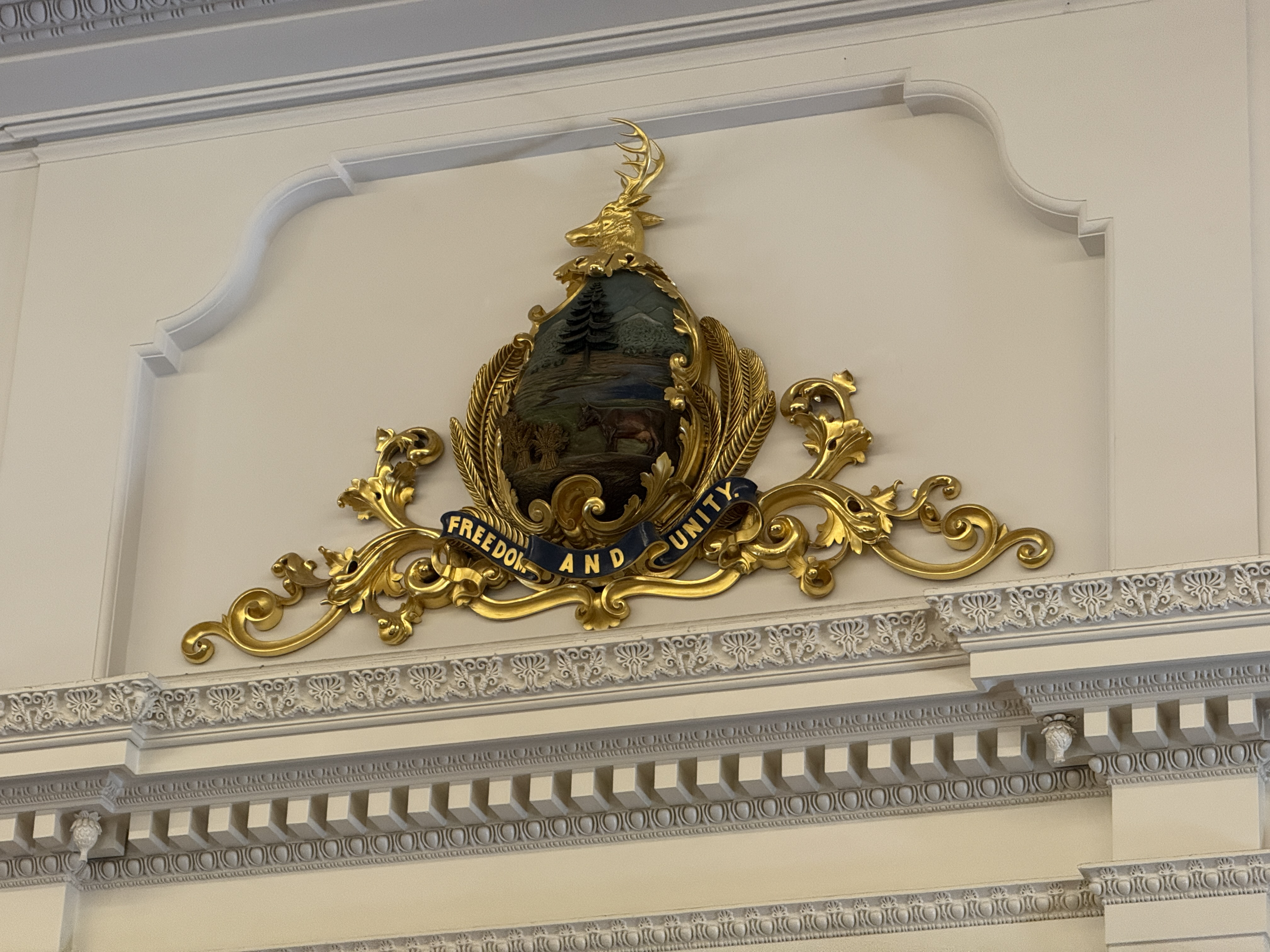
The Vermont State Coat of Arms displayed in Representatives Hall

The two chambers of the Vermont General Assembly are on the second floor. While both chambers have overhead visitors' galleries accessible on a third-floor mezzanine, visitors are welcome to quietly enter and sit in the main floor of the chambers. Contrary to the tradition of decorating the upper house in red and the lower house in green, established by the House of Lords and House of Commons in the United Kingdom, Vermont reserves the state colors of green and gold for its upper house, the Vermont Senate. Red and gold is used for the Vermont House of Representatives which meets in Representatives Hall. A large plaster ceiling medallion in the center of the chamber in the form of a lotus with a center rosette of acanthus leaves hold a two-tiered electrified gasolier manufactured in Philadelphia by Cornelius and Baker. Each petal of the rosette weighs approximately 500 pounds.

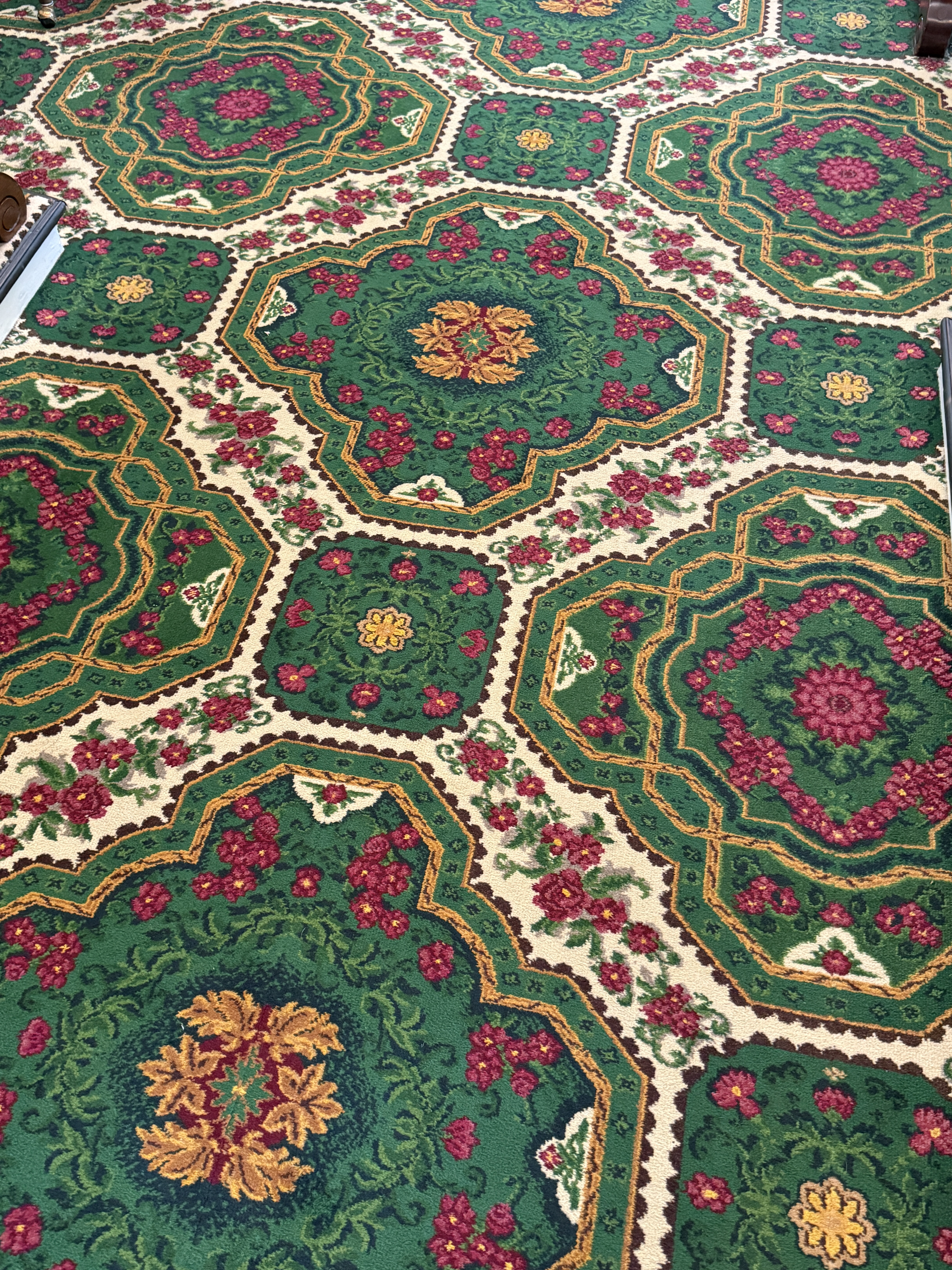
The carpet in the Senate Chamber

Brilliant axminster carpets have been recreated for both chambers based on old stereoscope views and small scraps found in an attic. On either side of the rostrum in Representatives Hall, are a series of connected elliptical-backed seats designed to fill the north wall of the chamber. The seats are upholstered and tufted in crimson and are used to seat members of the Vermont Senate during joint sessions of the General Assembly. The seats also accommodate the justices of the State's supreme court for the Governor's State of the State address and the inauguration of governors. Citizens frequently occupy these seats when the House is in separate session, or for large public hearings.

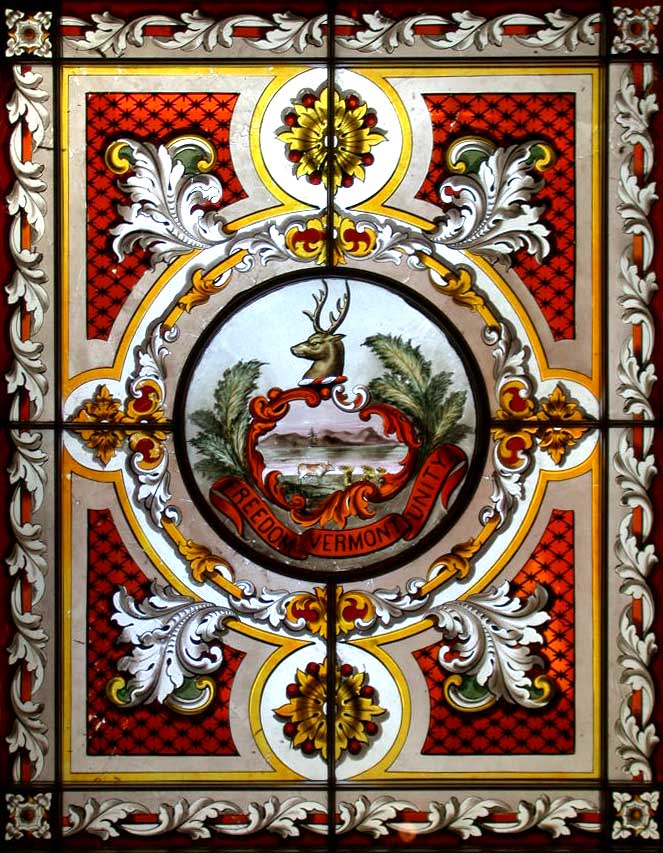
The state coat-of-arms is illustrated in one of two stained glass skylights In the Cedar Creek Room, a reception room in the west wing.

The second floor of the west wing includes the Cedar Creek Room, a large reception room featuring a mural painted by Julian Scott in 1874. The mural nearly fills the south wall and depicts the Battle of Cedar Creek during the American Civil War. The painting highlights the contributions of Vermont troops in the battle. The room is illuminated by two stained glass skylights in the deeply coffered ceiling dating to 1859 when the room housed the State Library. At some time the skylight was broken, and the opening closed. In 1970, while doing renovation work, workers discovered the broken pieces neatly stacked in the attic above the room. The pieces were reassembled, conserved, and reinstalled during the mid-1980s. One window (shown at left) depicts the obverse of the coat of arms of Vermont, which is a more painterly armorial representation of the Great Seal of Vermont (reserved solely for embossing documents), the arms are topped by the head of a buck white-tailed deer and circled by branches of Eastern White Pine (Pinus strobus). Pine badges were worn as an expression of Vermont identity by citizens while the state was a republic, and again during the American Civil War by Vermont's military regiments. The other skylight features the rarely seen reverse of the state coat of arms, a female personification of the state referred to as "Vermontannia." The wall stencils in the Cedar Creek Room are the original patterns, recreated based upon old photographs, and the colors were matched by paint analysis. It is seated among sheaths of corn and wheat, representing Vermont's agricultural history. This room is restored to its 1888 appearance when the room was converted from the State Library to use as a governor's reception room. The walls, and 20-foot ceilings are polychrome painted in a complex palette of tertiary colors: burnished copper, russet, salmon, and a deep blue-green with overlays of metallic stencilling. The style is largely of the Aesthetic Movement.

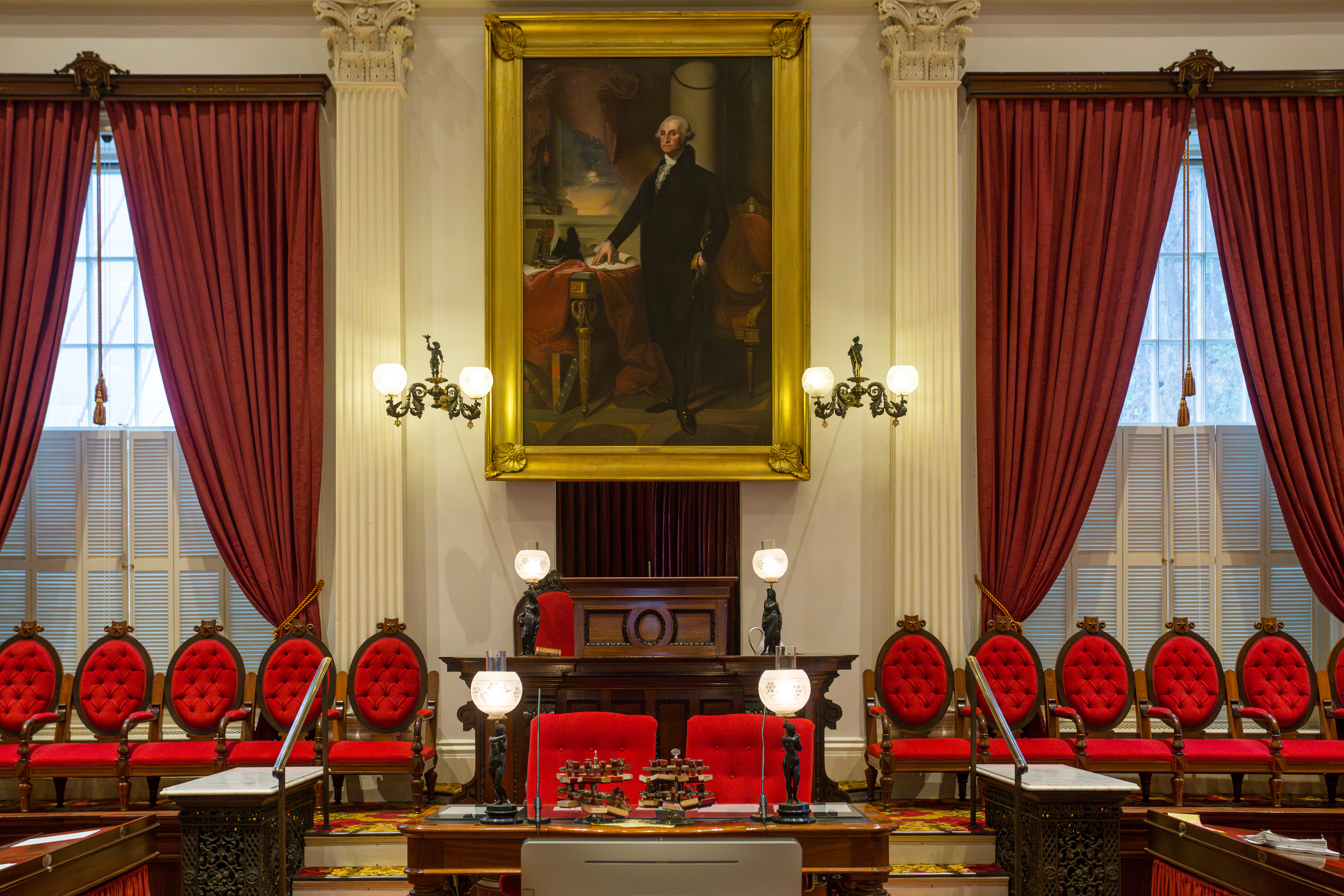
Gassner's portrait of George Washington above the speaker's chair in Representatives Hall

Most of the furnishings in the building date to the 1859 reconstruction of the State House, including the 30 black walnut chairs in the Vermont Senate chamber, still used for the same purpose today. Several American Empire-style sofas, a set of klismos chairs, carved black walnut Renaissance Revival-style chairs for the Senate President and House Speaker, and suites of Rococo Revival settées and chairs also date to the completion of Silloway's reconstruction. The majority of the lighting fixtures in the building are original, restored and electrified ormolu gas chandeliers and wall sconces manufactured in Philadelphia by Cornelius and Baker during the 1850s. The large two-tiered, 26-light chandelier in Representatives Hall features sculptures of mythological figures, including a copy of Vermont sculptor Hiram Powers' The Greek Slave, which became an abolitionist icon. Only the large portrait of George Washington, painted c. 1837 by George Gassner after Gilbert Stuart, which hangs above the speaker's chair in Representatives Hall, survived the fire of 1857.

== Use of the Vermont State House ==
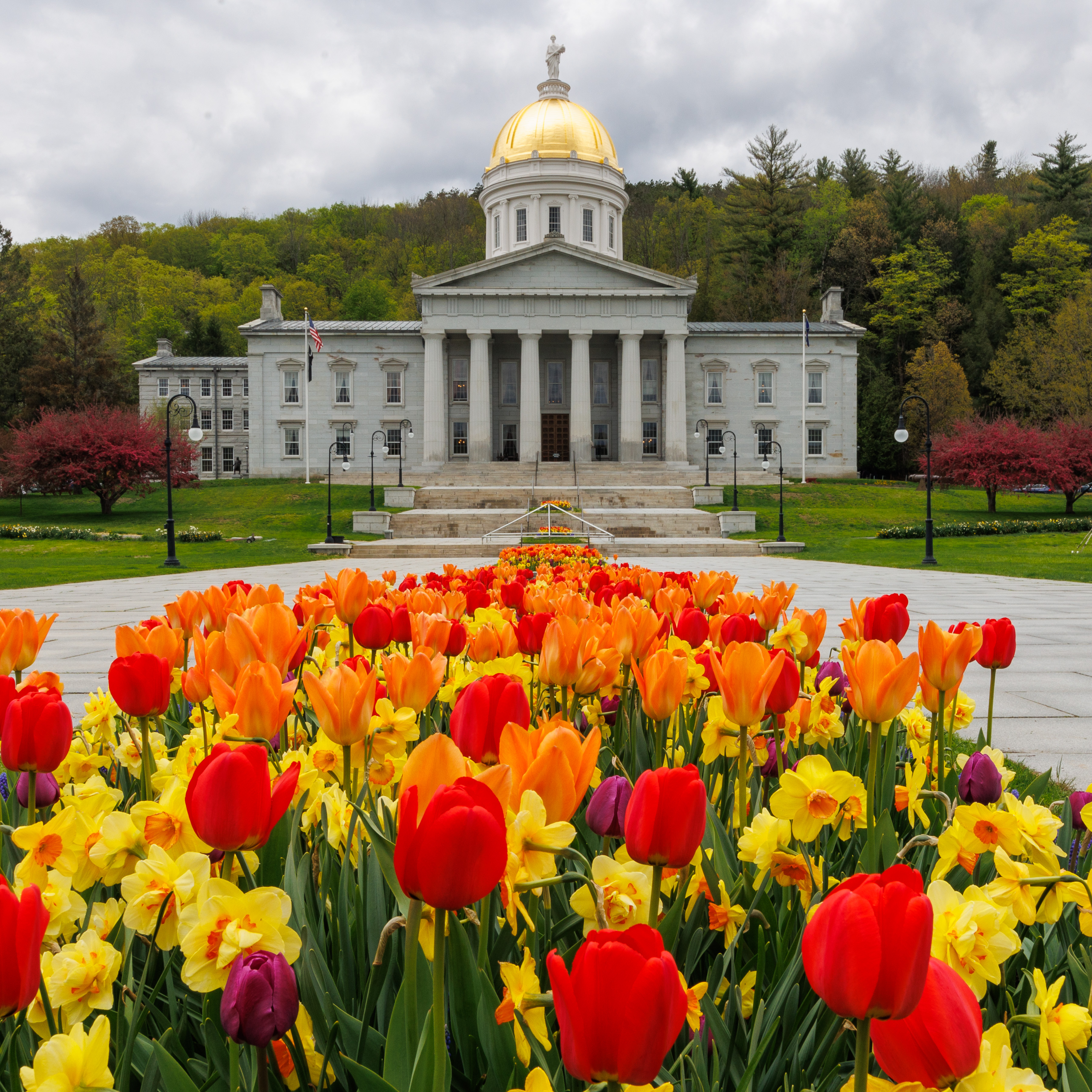
Landscaping at the Vermont State House lawn in 2024

Vermont's reputation for popular government is represented by the State House's nickname "the People's House." While its primary use is as the house of the legislative branch of Vermont government, it has from its beginnings also functioned as a living museum and state cultural facility.

The building is open to visitors with remarkably few restrictions whether the legislature is in session or not. The large Representatives Hall is used for evening concerts named "Farmers Nights" during winter months. During warmer weather, the public lawn on the south side is used for concerts by the Vermont Symphony Orchestra, municipal bands from around the state, marching regimental bagpipe tattoos, modern dance concerts, as well as to provide space for local residents to sit, eat, and play sports. Quilts, ceramics, photography and paintings by citizens periodically hang in the building's corridors, committee and caucus rooms, and dining room.

In recent years, each February 14 the columns of the portico and lawn are bedecked with red paper hearts by the so-called Valentine Phantom. Additionally, the public lawn and steps of the portico serve as a well-used platform for peaceful demonstrations, press conferences by various official and non-official groups, and for formally welcoming official visitors to the State of Vermont.

The House's backup generator in the basement was replaced by a 250 kWh battery in 2020, and supplies peak power and grid services to the public grid.

On June 12, 2013, Google added the Vermont State House to their Street View imagery.

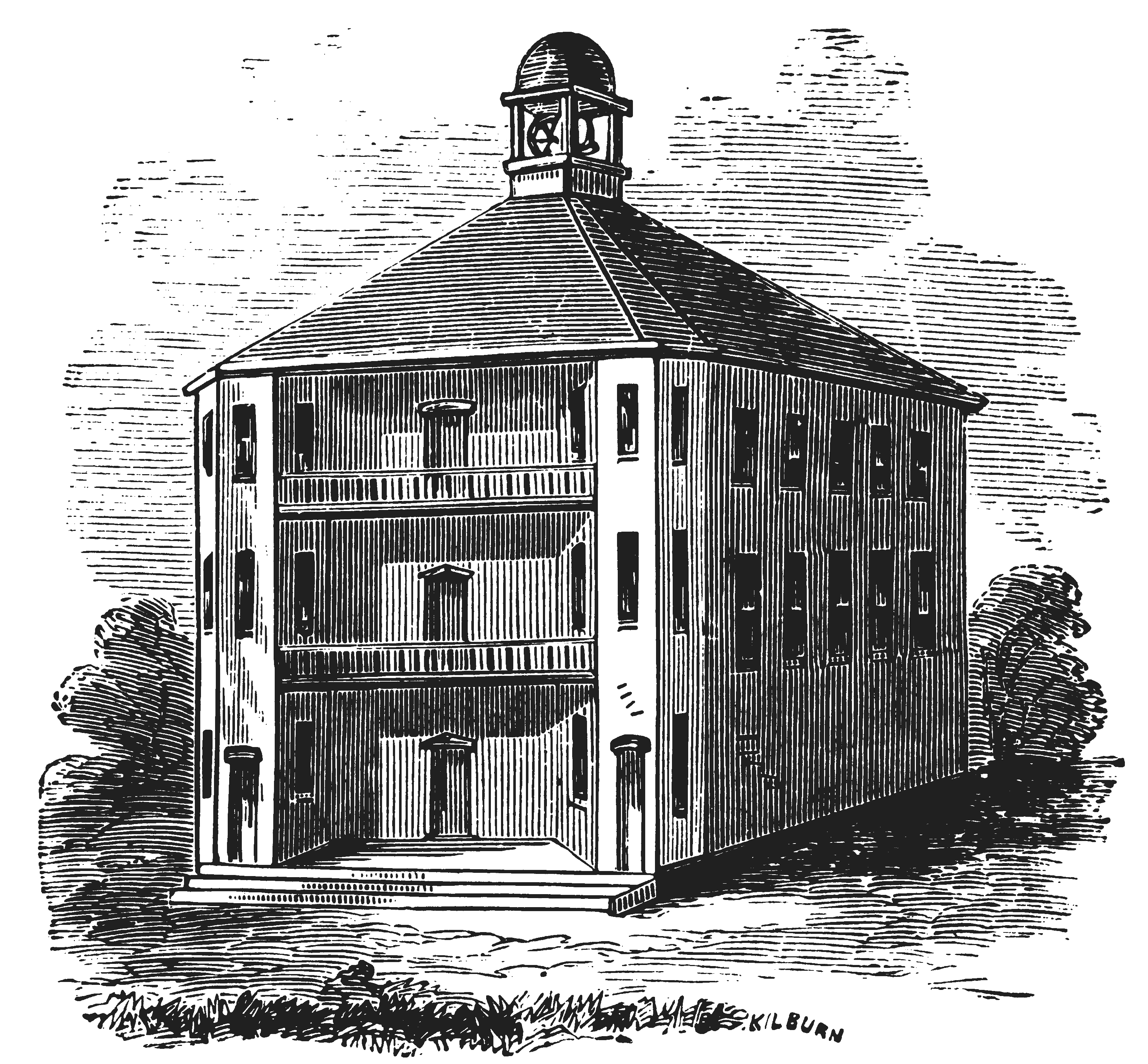
The first Vermont State House, built in 1808 was designed by Sylvanus Baldwin

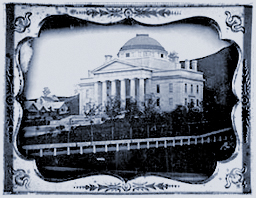
Circa 1856 daguerreotype of the second state house showing Ammi B. Young's low "saucer" dome

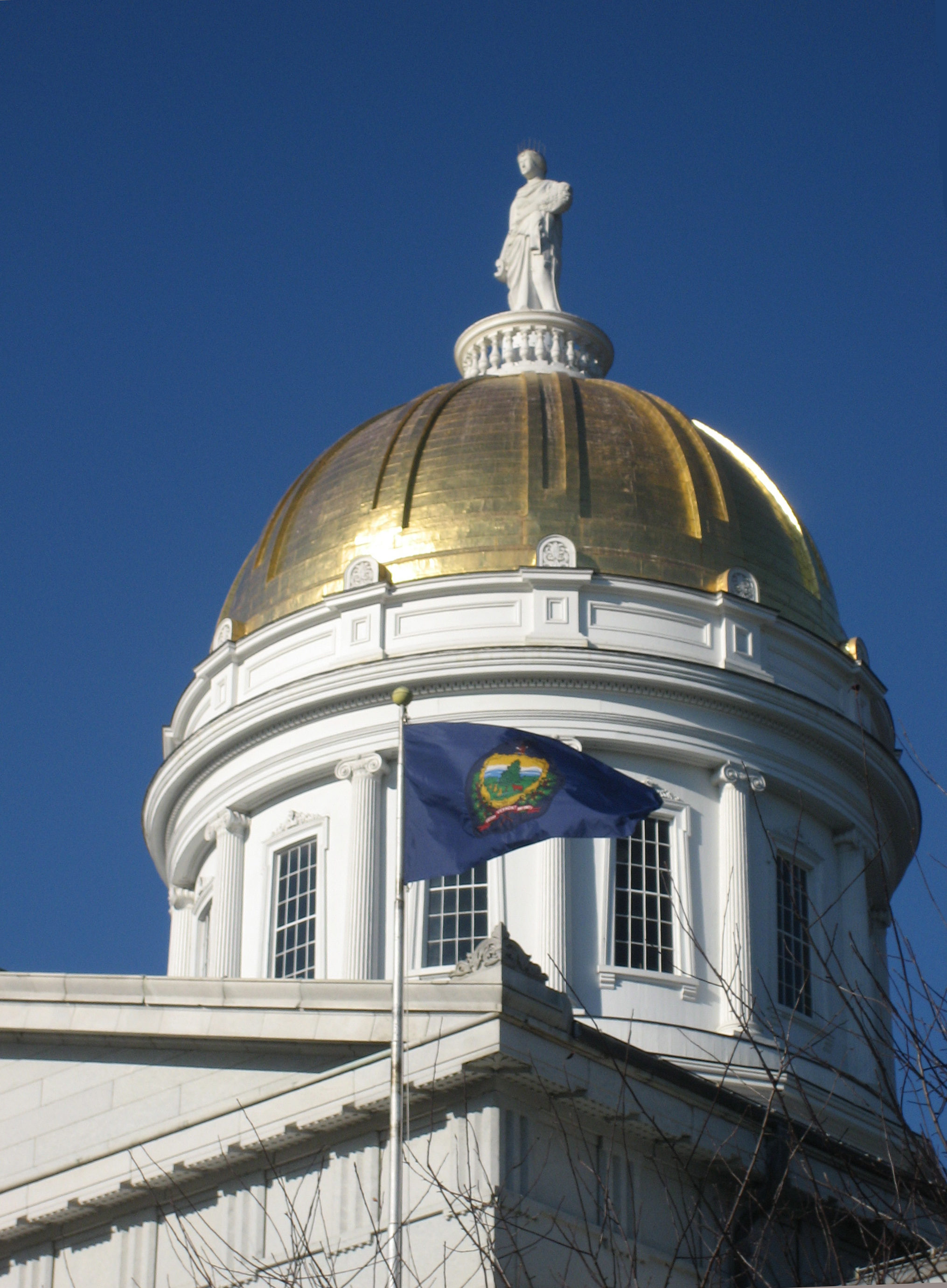
Thomas Silloway's dome is taller than Ammi B. Young's low saucer dome. Ionic columns support the dome which was originally painted red to resemble Tuscan terracotta tile.

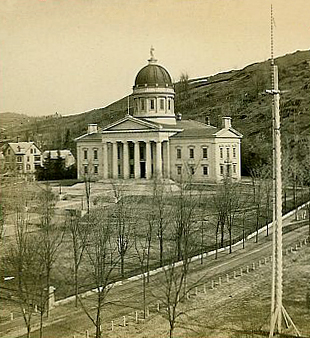
Circa 1870 stereograph view of the third state house showing Thomas Silloway's taller drum supported dome

== See also ==
- List of Vermont General Assemblies
- List of National Historic Landmarks in Vermont
- National Register of Historic Places listings in Washington County, Vermont
- List of state and territorial capitols in the United States
