= National Register of Historic Places listings in Sacramento County, California =

Location of Sacramento County in California

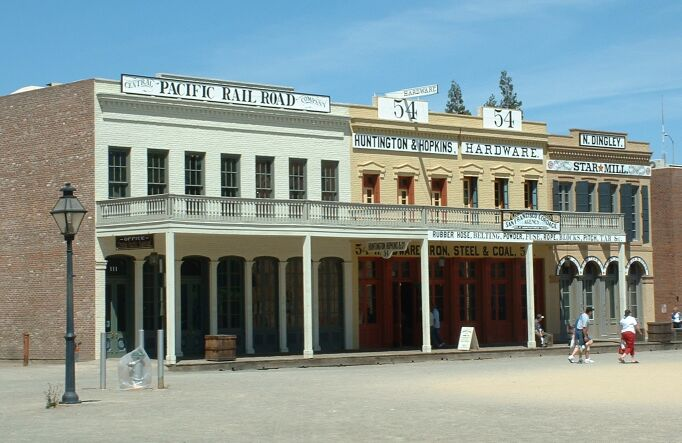
Big Four House, after move to Old Sacramento area

This is a list of the National Register of Historic Places listings in Sacramento County, California.

This is intended to be a complete list of the properties and districts on the National Register of Historic Places in Sacramento County, California, United States. Latitude and longitude coordinates are provided for many National Register properties and districts; these locations may be seen together in an online map.

There are 115 properties and districts listed on the National Register in the county, including 6 National Historic Landmarks. Another property was once listed but has been removed. The table does not include the Big Four House, which was designated a National Historic Landmark in 1961, but is not listed on the National Register.

This National Park Service list is complete through NPS recent listings posted September 25, 2026.

== Current listings ==
	Name on the Register	Image	Date listed	Location	City or town	Description
1	Alkali Flat Central Historic District	Alkali Flat Central Historic District	July 26, 1984 (#84000929)	Roughly E and F Sts. between 9th and 12th Sts. 38°35′04″N 121°29′23″W	Sacramento	
2	Alkali Flat North Historic District	Alkali Flat North Historic District	April 19, 1984 (#84000933)	D and 11th Sts. 38°35′12″N 121°29′16″W	Sacramento	
3	Alkali Flat West Historic District	Alkali Flat West Historic District	July 26, 1984 (#84000936)	E, F, and 8th Sts. 38°35′09″N 121°29′35″W	Sacramento	
4	Alta Mesa Farm Bureau Hall	Alta Mesa Farm Bureau Hall	January 7, 1987 (#86003577)	10195 Alta Mesa Rd. 38°23′13″N 121°13′25″W	Wilton	The hall was destroyed by fire in 1987, although the detached restroom building still stood as of June 2014.
5	American Cash Apartments-American Cash Store	American Cash Apartments-American Cash Store	March 22, 2016 (#16000094)	1117-1123 8th St. 38°34′47″N 121°29′48″W	Sacramento	
6	American River Grange Hall No. 172	American River Grange Hall No. 172	October 10, 1996 (#96001079)	2720 Kilgore Rd. 38°36′03″N 121°16′28″W	Rancho Cordova	
7	George & Mabel Barr House	George & Mabel Barr House	October 21, 2019 (#100004528)	2672 Montgomery Way; 38°32′48″N 121°28′40″W	Sacramento	
8	Blue Anchor Building	Blue Anchor Building	February 3, 1983 (#83001224)	1400 10th St. 38°34′33″N 121°29′42″W	Sacramento	
9	Boulevard Park	Boulevard Park	October 6, 2011 (#11000705)	Roughly bounded by B and H Streets, 20th Street, 22nd Street and 23rd Street; 38°34′53″N 121°28′32″W	Sacramento	Historic Residential Suburbs in the United States, 1830-1960 Multiple Property Submission (MPS)
10	Brewster Building	Brewster Building	August 16, 2000 (#00000981)	201 Fourth St. 38°15′13″N 121°21′42″W	Galt	
11	Brewster House	Brewster House	June 23, 1978 (#78000740)	206 5th St. 38°15′12″N 121°18′14″W	Galt	
12	Briggs Mansion		April 27, 2026 (#100012942)	2015 21st Street; 38°33′53″N 121°29′00″W	Sacramento	
13	Brighton School	Brighton School	April 3, 1981 (#81000168)	3312 Bradshaw Rd. 38°33′44″N 121°20′09″W	Sacramento	
14	John Stanford Brown House		July 28, 2004 (#04000733)	13950 CA 160; 38°14′53″N 121°30′41″W	Walnut Grove	
15	California Governor's Mansion	California Governor's Mansion	November 10, 1970 (#70000139)	16th and H Sts. 38°34′49″N 121°29′01″W	Sacramento	
16	California State Capitol	California State Capitol	April 3, 1973 (#73000427)	Between 10th and 16th and L and N Sts. 38°34′34″N 121°29′26″W	Sacramento	
17	Calpak Plant No. 11	Calpak Plant No. 11	May 17, 1984 (#84000939)	1721 C St. 38°35′09″N 121°28′49″W	Sacramento	
18	Capitol Extension District	Capitol Extension District	May 24, 1984 (#84000944)	Capitol Mall; 38°34′37″N 121°29′46″W	Sacramento	
19	J.C. Carly House	J.C. Carly House	March 22, 2006 (#06000143)	2761 Montgomery Way; 38°32′56″N 121°28′33″W	Sacramento	
20	Chung Wah Cemetery	Chung Wah Cemetery	August 21, 1995 (#95000999)	Mormon St. vicinity, near Lake Natoma; 38°40′13″N 121°11′43″W	Folsom	
21	Cohn House	Cohn House	January 21, 1982 (#82002228)	305 Scott St. 38°40′43″N 121°10′26″W	Folsom	
22	Coolot Company Building	Coolot Company Building	September 20, 1978 (#78000742)	812 J St. 38°34′51″N 121°29′41″W	Sacramento	No longer standing. Originally constructed in 1861 by Leland Stanford.
23	Cranston-Geary House	Cranston-Geary House	January 23, 1998 (#97001662)	2101 G St. 38°34′47″N 121°28′32″W	Sacramento	
24	E. B. Crocker Art Gallery	E. B. Crocker Art Gallery	May 6, 1971 (#71000176)	216 O St. 38°34′37″N 121°30′18″W	Sacramento	
25	Delta King	Delta King	March 31, 1978 (#78000797)	1000 Front St. 38°34′58″N 121°30′25″W	Sacramento	Located in Rio Vista when listed on the National Register; moved to Old Sacramento in 1984 and converted to a hotel, restaurant and theater
26	Delta Meadows Site	Delta Meadows Site	November 5, 1971 (#71000175)	Address Restricted	Locke	
27	James C. Dodd & Associates Offices		January 12, 2026 (#100012535)	2710 X Street; 38°33′31″N 121°28′37″W	Sacramento	
28	Dunlap's Dining Room	Dunlap's Dining Room	April 2, 1992 (#92000308)	4322 Fourth Ave. 38°32′52″N 121°27′18″W	Sacramento	
29	Eastern Star Hall	Eastern Star Hall	January 7, 1993 (#92001757)	2719 K St. 38°34′21″N 121°28′22″W	Sacramento	
30	William Ehrhardt House	William Ehrhardt House	July 10, 2003 (#03000614)	Dartmoor Way and Percheron Dr. 38°24′11″N 121°26′54″W	Elk Grove	
31	El Dorado School		October 1, 2026 (#100013452)	5241 J Street; 38°33′58″N 121°26′22″W	Sacramento	
32	Elk Grove Historic District	Elk Grove Historic District	March 1, 1988 (#87002410)	8986-9097 Elk Grove Blvd. also School, Gage and Grove Sts. 38°24′33″N 121°21′49″W	Elk Grove	
33	Fire Station No. 6	Fire Station No. 6	April 25, 1991 (#91000484)	3414 4th Ave. 38°33′02″N 121°28′07″W	Sacramento	
34	Firehouse No. 3	Firehouse No. 3	October 29, 1991 (#91001537)	1215 19th St. 38°34′28″N 121°28′52″W	Sacramento	
35	Folsom Depot	Folsom Depot	February 19, 1982 (#82002229)	200 Wool St. 38°40′45″N 121°10′47″W	Folsom	Southern Pacific Railroad standard design Two-Story Combination Depot No. 22
36	Folsom Powerhouse	Folsom Powerhouse	October 2, 1973 (#73000426)	Off Folsom Blvd. in Folsom Lake State Recreation Area; 38°40′50″N 121°10′32″W	Folsom	
37	Mary Haley Galarneaux House	Mary Haley Galarneaux House	February 12, 2001 (#01000077)	922-924 T. St. 38°34′15″N 121°29′56″W	Sacramento	
38	Goethe House	Goethe House	February 19, 1982 (#82002230)	3731 T St. 38°33′33″N 121°27′34″W	Sacramento	
39	Grant Union High School	Grant Union High School	September 28, 2026 (#100013442)	1400 Grand Avenue; 38°38′10″N 121°26′06″W	Sacramento	
40	John T. Greene House	John T. Greene House	April 15, 1982 (#82002231)	3200 H St. 38°34′31″N 121°27′44″W	Sacramento	
41	Anne Hathaway Cottage	Anne Hathaway Cottage	October 21, 2019 (#100004529)	2640 Montgomery; 38°32′48″N 121°28′43″W	Sacramento	
42	Heilbron House	Heilbron House	December 12, 1976 (#76000511)	704 O St. 38°34′34″N 121°29′54″W	Sacramento	
43	Hotel Lenhart	Hotel Lenhart	September 22, 2021 (#100006998)	1117-1131 9th St. 38°34′44″N 121°29′44″W	Sacramento	
44	Hotel Regis	Hotel Regis	October 29, 1982 (#82000979)	1024-1030 K St; 38°34′44″N 121°29′30″W	Sacramento	
45	Hotel Senator	Hotel Senator	May 30, 1979 (#79003459)	1121 L St. 38°34′40″N 121°29′28″W	Sacramento	
46	Edward P. Howe Jr. House	Edward P. Howe Jr. House	February 19, 1982 (#82002232)	2215 21st St. 38°33′46″N 121°28′59″W	Sacramento	
47	Hubbard-Upson House	Hubbard-Upson House	December 2, 1977 (#77000327)	1010 F St. 38°35′04″N 121°29′24″W	Sacramento	
48	I Street Bridge	I Street Bridge	April 22, 1982 (#82002233)	CA 16; 38°34′39″N 121°30′18″W	Sacramento	
49	Imperial Theatre	Imperial Theatre	October 29, 1982 (#82000980)	Market St. 38°14′29″N 121°30′46″W	Walnut Grove	
50	Indian Stone Corral		April 16, 1975 (#75000456)	Address Restricted	Orangevale	
51	Isleton Chinese and Japanese Commercial Districts	Isleton Chinese and Japanese Commercial Districts	March 14, 1991 (#91000297)	Bounded by River Rd. and Union, E and H Sts. 38°09′45″N 121°36′18″W	Isleton	
52	J Street Wreck		May 16, 1991 (#91000562)	At the foot of J St., in the Sacramento River; 38°35′02″N 121°30′19″W	Sacramento	The remains of a brig used as a warehouse off J Street which sank in 1855.
53	Thomas Jefferson School	Thomas Jefferson School	March 17, 2021 (#100006319)	1619 N St. 38°34′25″N 121°29′11″W	Sacramento	
54	Joe Mound		October 14, 1971 (#71000177)	Address Restricted	Sacramento	An Indian village site of the Maidu near present day Discovery Park. No marker on the site.
55	J. Neely Johnson House	J. Neely Johnson House	September 13, 1976 (#76000512)	1029 F St. 38°35′05″N 121°29′22″W	Sacramento	
56	Theodore Judah School	Theodore Judah School	July 25, 1997 (#97000810)	3919 McKinley Blvd. 38°34′39″N 121°27′42″W	Sacramento	
57	Kuchler Row	Kuchler Row	June 25, 1982 (#82002234)	608-614 10th St. 38°35′03″N 121°29′27″W	Sacramento	
58	Charles Lais House	Charles Lais House	February 28, 1985 (#85000358)	1301 H St. 38°34′54″N 121°29′13″W	Sacramento	
59	Lawrence Warehouse	Lawrence Warehouse	January 15, 2014 (#13001067)	1108 R St. 38°34′15″N 121°29′44″W	Sacramento	
60	Libby, McNeil and Libby Fruit and Vegetable Cannery	Libby, McNeil and Libby Fruit and Vegetable Cannery	March 2, 1982 (#82002235)	1724 Stockton Blvd. 38°33′52″N 121°27′59″W	Sacramento	
61	Locke Historic District	Locke Historic District	May 6, 1971 (#71000174)	Bounded on the W by the Sacramento River, on the N by Locke Rd., on the E by Alley St., and on the S by Levee St. 38°15′03″N 121°30′26″W	Locke	
62	Maydestone Apartments	Maydestone Apartments	September 25, 2012 (#12000812)	1001 15th St. 38°34′42″N 121°29′11″W	Sacramento	
63	C. K. McClatchy Senior High School	C. K. McClatchy Senior High School	November 2, 2001 (#01001193)	3066 Freeport Blvd. 38°33′04″N 121°29′33″W	Sacramento	
64	McKinley Park	McKinley Park	October 18, 2018 (#100003036)	Corner of H St. & Alhambra Blvd. 38°34′30″N 121°27′48″W	Sacramento	
65	Merchants National Bank of Sacramento	Merchants National Bank of Sacramento	February 16, 1996 (#96000108)	1015 7th St. 38°34′52″N 121°29′47″W	Sacramento	
66	Merrium Apartments		September 13, 1990 (#90001386)	1017 14th St. 38°34′41″N 121°29′12″W	Sacramento	Demolished in the 1990s for expansion of the Sacramento Convention Center.
67	Mesick House	Mesick House	January 21, 1982 (#82002236)	517 8th St. 38°35′10″N 121°29′34″W	Sacramento	
68	Mohr and Yoerk Market	Mohr and Yoerk Market	July 31, 2017 (#100001385)	1029 K St. 38°34′45″N 121°29′34″W	Sacramento	
69	Montgomery Way Gateway Historic District		September 29, 2023 (#100009396)	2640-2770 Montgomery Way and 3065, 3071 East Curtis Dr. 38°32′48″N 121°28′41″W	Sacramento	
70	Murer House and Gardens	Murer House and Gardens	January 19, 2022 (#100007367)	1125 Joe Murer Ct. 38°40′23″N 121°10′56″W	Folsom	
71	New Helvetia Historic District	New Helvetia Historic District	April 4, 2014 (#14000109)	752 Revere St. 38°33′46″N 121°30′17″W	Sacramento	
72	Nisei VFW Post 8985	Nisei VFW Post 8985	October 20, 2020 (#100005713)	1515 4th St. 38°34′35″N 121°30′14″W	Sacramento	
73	Nisenan Village Site		March 21, 1978 (#78000739)	Address Restricted	Carmichael	
74	North Sacramento School	North Sacramento School	March 16, 2021 (#100006320)	670 Dixieanne Ave. 38°36′33″N 121°27′05″W	Sacramento	
75	Old Fair Oaks Bridge	Old Fair Oaks Bridge	September 25, 2006 (#06000913)	Crosses the American River at Bridge St. to American River Pkwy, north of Upper Sunrise Dr. in Gold River; 38°38′17″N 121°15′54″W	Fair Oaks	
76	Old Sacramento Historic District	Old Sacramento Historic District	October 15, 1966 (#66000219)	Junctions of U.S. 40, 50, 99, and CA 16 and 24; 38°34′58″N 121°30′12″W	Sacramento	
77	Old Tavern	Old Tavern	September 15, 1983 (#83001225)	2801 Capitol Ave. 38°34′15″N 121°28′09″W	Sacramento	
78	PG&E Powerhouse	PG&E Powerhouse	September 23, 2010 (#10000774)	400 Jibboom St. 38°35′42″N 121°30′18″W	Sacramento	
79	Pony Express Terminal	Pony Express Terminal	October 15, 1966 (#66000220)	1006 2nd St. 38°34′59″N 121°30′11″W	Sacramento	Also known as B. F. Hastings Bank Building
80	Rosebud Ranch	Rosebud Ranch	December 31, 1979 (#79000521)	North of Hood; 38°23′08″N 121°30′46″W	Hood	
81	Ruhstaller Building	Ruhstaller Building	January 21, 1982 (#82002237)	900 J St. 38°34′50″N 121°29′38″W	Sacramento	Built in 1898, at the corner of 9th and J Street in Sacramento, California, the 20,000 square feet building was built by the behest of Frank F. Ruhstaller and housed The Ruhstaller Brewery offices. Ruhstaller also managed Buffalo Brewery and made the building its headquarters as well.
82	Runyon House	Runyon House	October 27, 2000 (#00001270)	12865 River Rd. 38°17′20″N 121°33′20″W	Courtland	
83	Sacramento Air Depot Historic District	Sacramento Air Depot Historic District	January 21, 1992 (#91001969)	McClellan Air Force Base; 38°39′33″N 121°23′13″W	North Highlands	
84	Sacramento Bank Building	Sacramento Bank Building	January 21, 1982 (#82002238)	3418 Broadway; 38°33′07″N 121°28′05″W	Sacramento	
85	Sacramento City Cemetery	Sacramento City Cemetery	November 5, 2014 (#14000889)	1000 Broadway; 38°33′47″N 121°30′04″W	Sacramento	
86	Sacramento City Library	Sacramento City Library	July 30, 1992 (#92000967)	828 I St. 38°34′54″N 121°29′42″W	Sacramento	part of the California Carnegie Libraries MPS
87	Sacramento Hall of Justice	Sacramento Hall of Justice	September 24, 1999 (#99001179)	813 6th St. 38°35′01″N 121°29′06″W	Sacramento	
88	Sacramento Junior College Annex and Extensions	Sacramento Junior College Annex and Extensions	August 22, 1994 (#94000924)	3835 Freeport Blvd. 38°32′28″N 121°29′17″W	Sacramento	
89	Sacramento Masonic Temple	Sacramento Masonic Temple	May 17, 2001 (#01000488)	1131 J St. 38°34′55″N 121°29′27″W	Sacramento	
90	Sacramento Memorial Auditorium	Sacramento Memorial Auditorium	March 29, 1978 (#78000743)	16th and J Sts. 38°34′44″N 121°29′05″W	Sacramento	
91	Sacramento Shops Historic District	Sacramento Shops Historic District	March 25, 2024 (#100010111)	111 I Street; 38°35′05″N 121°30′17″W	Sacramento	Former Central Pacific, Southern Pacific and Union Pacific railyard and workshop that operated from 1863 - 1999. Now used by the California State Railroad Museum for storage and work for their locomotives and the Sacramento Railyards Project.
92	Shiloh Baptist Church	Shiloh Baptist Church	July 3, 2012 (#12000376)	3552 7th Ave. 38°32′40″N 121°28′07″W	Sacramento	
93	Slocum House	Slocum House	January 31, 1979 (#79000520)	7992 California Ave. 38°38′29″N 121°16′05″W	Fair Oaks	
94	Southern Pacific Railroad Company's Sacramento Depot	Southern Pacific Railroad Company's Sacramento Depot	April 21, 1975 (#75000457)	5th and I Sts. 38°35′03″N 121°30′00″W	Sacramento	
95	SMUD Headquarters Building	SMUD Headquarters Building	January 4, 2010 (#09001161)	6301 S. St. 38°33′11″N 121°25′58″W	Sacramento	
96	Southern Pacific Railroad Section Superintendent House	Southern Pacific Railroad Section Superintendent House	June 13, 2008 (#08000501)	815 Oakdale St. 38°40′11″N 121°10′55″W	Folsom	
97	Southside Park	Southside Park	December 18, 2017 (#100001892)	Between T, W, 6th & 8th Sts. 38°34′08″N 121°30′11″W	Sacramento	
98	Stanford-Lathrop House	Stanford-Lathrop House	December 9, 1971 (#71000178)	800 N St. 38°34′35″N 121°29′50″W	Sacramento	A mansion once owned by Leland Stanford, Governor of California from 1862 to 1863, U.S. Senator from 1885 to 1893, railroad tycoon, member of the Big Four and founder of Stanford University.
99	Sutter Club	Sutter Club	May 8, 2017 (#100000951)	1220 9th St. 38°34′40″N 121°29′47″W	Sacramento	
100	Sutter's Fort	Sutter's Fort	October 15, 1966 (#66000221)	2701 L St. 38°34′20″N 121°28′12″W	Sacramento	
101	Thomson-Diggs Company Building		October 1, 2026 (#100013470)	1800 3rd Street; 38°34′25″N 121°30′24″W	Sacramento	
102	Tower Bridge	Tower Bridge	June 24, 1982 (#82004845)	CA 275 across Sacramento River; 38°34′18″N 121°30′25″W	Sacramento	
103	Travelers' Hotel	Travelers' Hotel	October 19, 1978 (#78000744)	428 J St. 38°34′54″N 121°29′58″W	Sacramento	
104	U.S. Post Office, Courthouse and Federal Building	U.S. Post Office, Courthouse and Federal Building	January 25, 1980 (#80000835)	801 I St. 38°34′57″N 121°29′37″W	Sacramento	
105	Van Voorhies House	Van Voorhies House	November 17, 1977 (#77000328)	925 G St. 38°35′03″N 121°29′29″W	Sacramento	
106	Anton Wagner Duplex	Anton Wagner Duplex	November 10, 1980 (#80000836)	701 E St. 38°35′13″N 121°29′35″W	Sacramento	
107	Walnut Grove Chinese-American Historic District	Walnut Grove Chinese-American Historic District	March 22, 1990 (#90000484)	Bounded by C, Tyler, and Bridge Sts., and River Rd. 38°14′32″N 121°30′46″W	Walnut Grove	
108	Walnut Grove Commercial/Residential Historic District	Walnut Grove Commercial/Residential Historic District	April 12, 1990 (#90000551)	Browns Alley and River Rd. 38°14′21″N 121°30′54″W	Walnut Grove	
109	Walnut Grove Gakuen Hall	Walnut Grove Gakuen Hall	June 17, 1980 (#80000837)	Pine and C Sts. 38°14′31″N 121°30′33″W	Walnut Grove	
110	Walnut Grove Japanese-American Historic District	Walnut Grove Japanese-American Historic District	March 22, 1990 (#90000483)	Bounded by Winnie St., Tyler St., C St., and River Rd. 38°14′36″N 121°30′44″W	Walnut Grove	
111	Westminster Presbyterian Church	Westminster Presbyterian Church	May 22, 2003 (#03000425)	1300 N St. 38°34′35″N 121°29′27″W	Sacramento	
112	Julius Wetzlar House	Julius Wetzlar House	March 31, 1983 (#83001226)	1021 H St. 38°34′58″N 121°29′27″W	Sacramento	
113	Winters House	Winters House	January 25, 1999 (#98001634)	2324 and 2326 H St. 38°34′39″N 121°28′23″W	Sacramento	
114	Edwin Witter Ranch	Edwin Witter Ranch	March 14, 1991 (#91000284)	3480 Witter Way; 38°37′54″N 121°32′05″W	Sacramento	
115	Woodlake Site		May 6, 1971 (#71000179)	Address Restricted	Sacramento	

== Former listings ==
	Name on the Register	Image	Date listed	Date removed	Location	City or town	Description
1	Alhambra Theatre		March 1, 1973 (#73002250)	June 11, 1973	1101 Alhambra Blvd.	Sacramento	Demolished in 1973.
2	Bennett Mound		1971 (#71001077)	Unknown	NW of Sacramento	Sacramento	Destroyed by agricultural operations
3	Utah Condensed Milk Company Plant		August 3, 1978 (#78000741)	August 30, 2005	621 3rd St.	Sacramento	Destroyed by fire November 24, 1992

== See also ==
- List of National Historic Landmarks in California
- National Register of Historic Places listings in California
- California Historical Landmarks in Sacramento County, California
