= Brewster Building =

Brewster Building can refer to:

- Brewster Building (Galt, California), on the National Register of Historic Places
- Brewster Building (Queens), New York, formerly a historic car and airplane manufacturing plant, later JetBlue headquarters

== See also ==
- Brewster Apartments, a historic building in Chicago
