= Shiloh Baptist Church (Sacramento, California) =

Historic church in Sacramento, California

- U.S. National Register of Historic Places
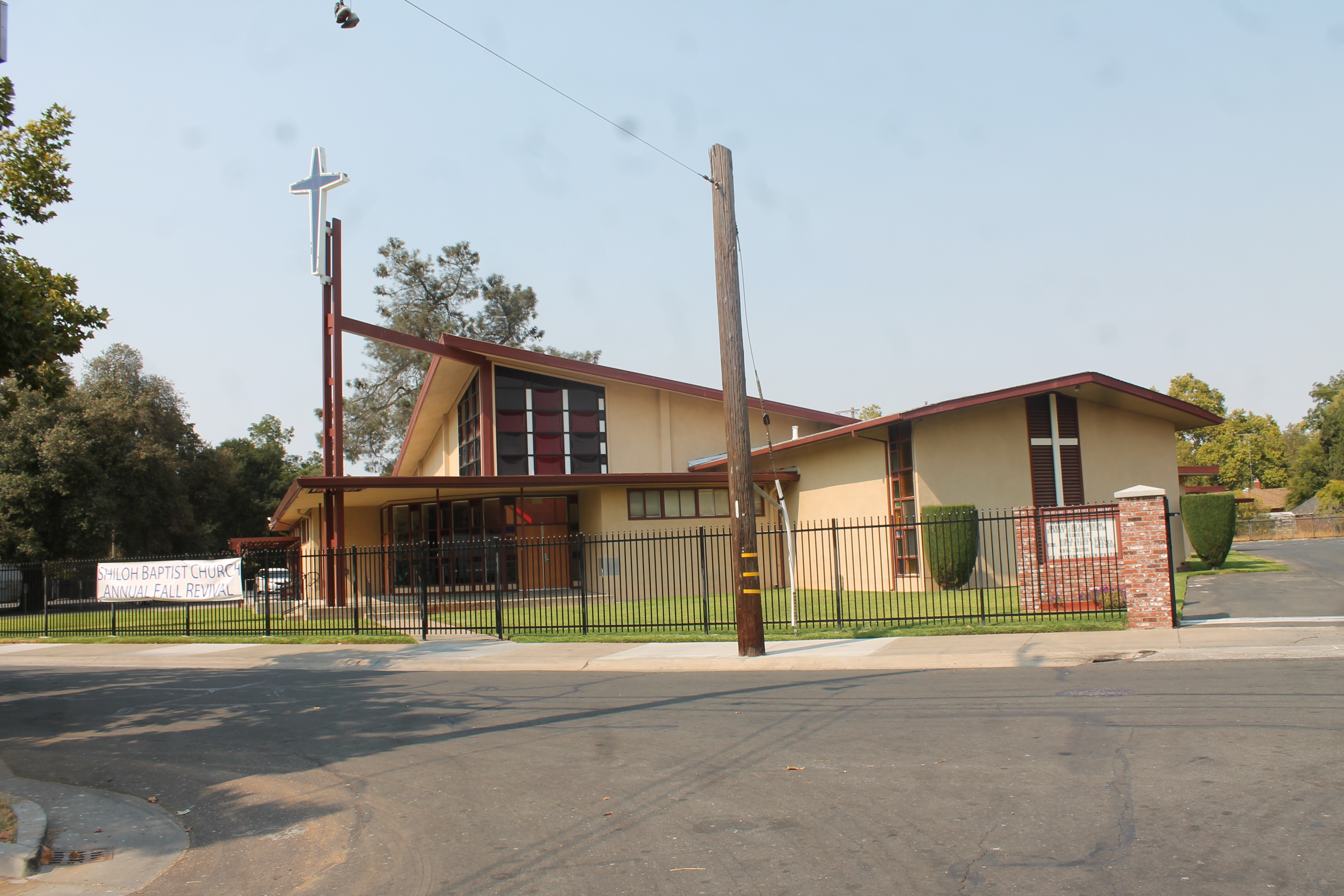

- Location within Sacramento, California Location within California Location within the United States
- Location: 3552 7th Ave., Sacramento, California
- Coordinates: 38°32′40.2″N 121°28′06.2″W
- Area: 3.08 acres (1.25 ha)
- Built: 1958-1963
- Architect: James C. Dodd
- Architectural style: Mid-century Modern
- NRHP reference No.: 12000376
- Added to NRHP: July 3, 2012

The Shiloh Baptist Church, located in Sacramento, California is a historic African American Baptist church built between 1958 and 1963. Designed by James C. Dodd, Sacramento's first African-American licensed architect and built primarily by Reverend Willie P. Cooke, pastor of Shiloh. It served as the focal point for the African-American community of Sacramento's Oak Park neighborhood, and was constructed by the congregation.

== See also ==
- History of Sacramento, California
- National Register of Historic Places listings in Sacramento County, California
