= Ruhstaller Building =

Historic building in California, United States

- U.S. National Register of Historic Places
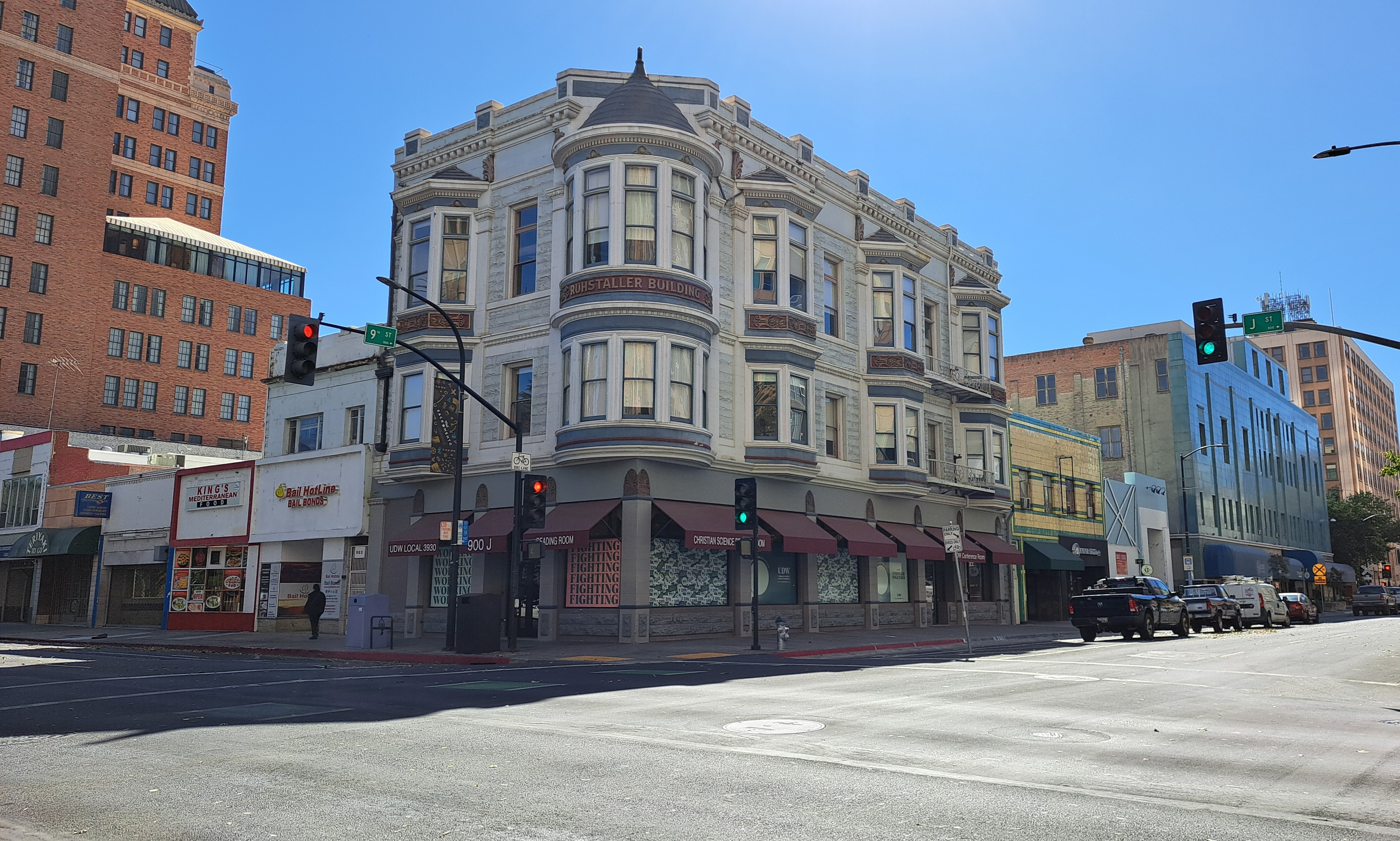

- Location within Sacramento, California Location within California Location within the United States
- Location: 900 J St., Sacramento, California
- Coordinates: 38°34′50″N 121°29′38″W
- Area: 0.1 acres (0.040 ha)
- Built: 1898
- Architectural style: Queen Anne; Romanesque Revival
- NRHP reference No.: 82002237
- Added to NRHP: January 21, 1982

The Ruhstaller Building, listed on the National Register of Historic Places, is a historic building located in the heart of Downtown Sacramento, California, USA.

== History ==
Built in 1898, the 20,000 square feet (1,900 m^{2}) building was built by the behest of Frank Ruhstaller and housed The Ruhstaller Brewery offices. Ruhstaller also managed Buffalo Brewery and made the building its headquarters as well. One of the new technologies the building featured was air conditioning that functioned with water pumped in from the Sacramento River.

Multiple rehab projects have been completed on the building over the years, the most recent of which was in 2004. The project focused on, among other things, renovating the third and fourth floors that had been vacant for some time.

== See also ==
- History of Sacramento, California
- California Historical Landmarks in Sacramento County, California
- National Register of Historic Places listings in Sacramento County, California
