= Blue Anchor Building =

- U.S. National Register of Historic Places
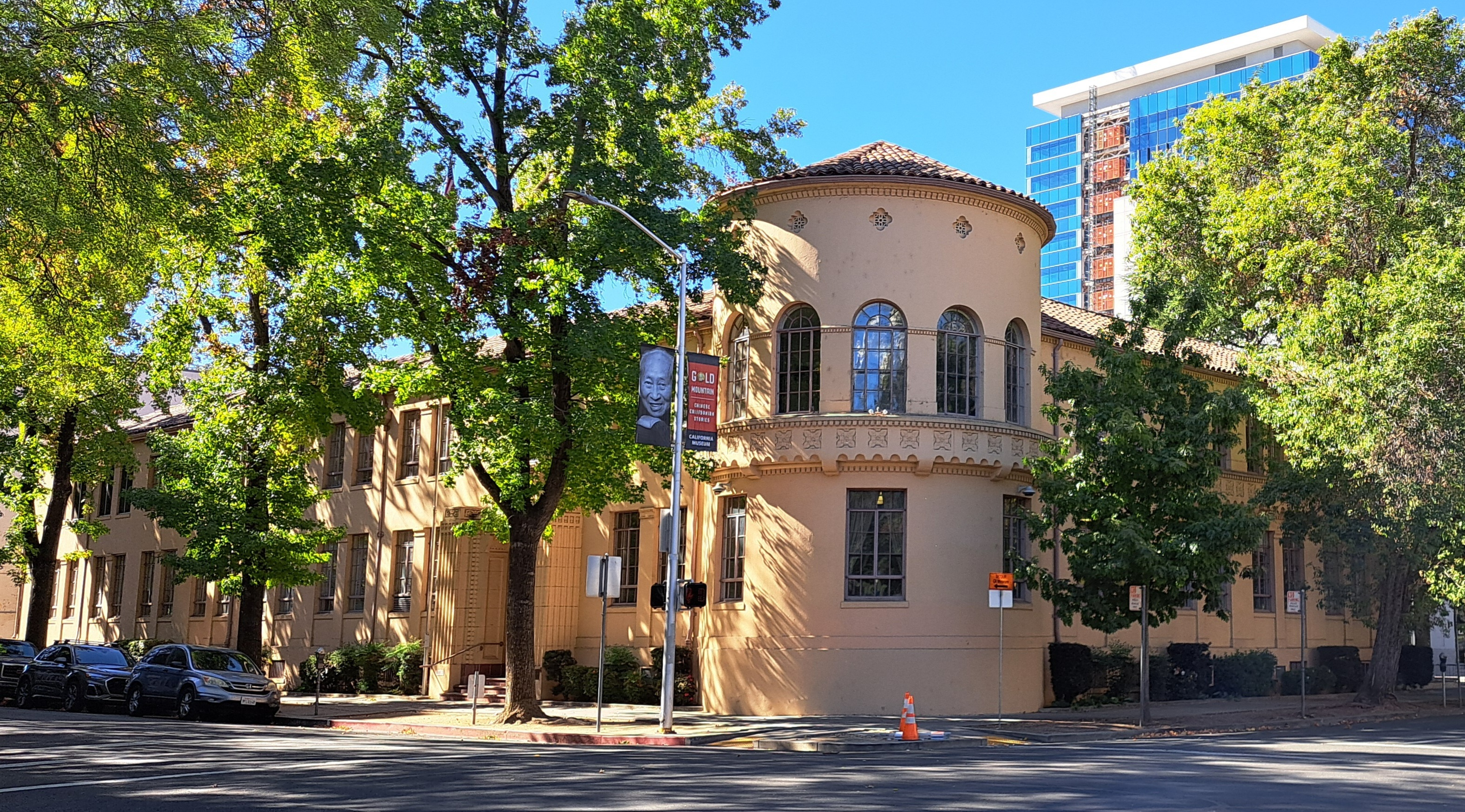

- Location within Sacramento, California Location within California
- Location: 1400 10th St., Sacramento, California
- Coordinates: 38°34′32.3″N 121°29′44.7″W
- Area: 0.3 acres (0.12 ha)
- Built: 1931
- Architect: Starks and Flanders
- Architectural style: Mission/Spanish Colonial Revival
- NRHP reference No.: 83001224
- Added to NRHP: February 3, 1983

The Blue Anchor Building, also known as the California Fruit Exchange, is a historic building located in Sacramento, California. It is currently home to the Governor of California's Office of Planning & Research.

== Description and history ==
The Spanish Colonial Revival style commercial building was built in 1931, and was designed by the Starks and Flanders architecture firm. It is an L-shaped, two-story structure constructed of steel and concrete, finished in stucco, and capped by a low-pitched red tile roof, and has a 2 1/2-story tower at the corner where the streets intersect.

Since 1966, several state agencies have occupied the Blue Anchor Building. It is currently used the Governor's Office of Planning and Research. The building was listed on the National Register of Historic Places on February 3, 1983.

== See also ==
- History of Sacramento, California
- National Register of Historic Places listings in Sacramento County, California
- California Historical Landmarks in Sacramento County, California
