= Winters House (Sacramento, California) =

Historic house in California, United States

- U.S. National Register of Historic Places
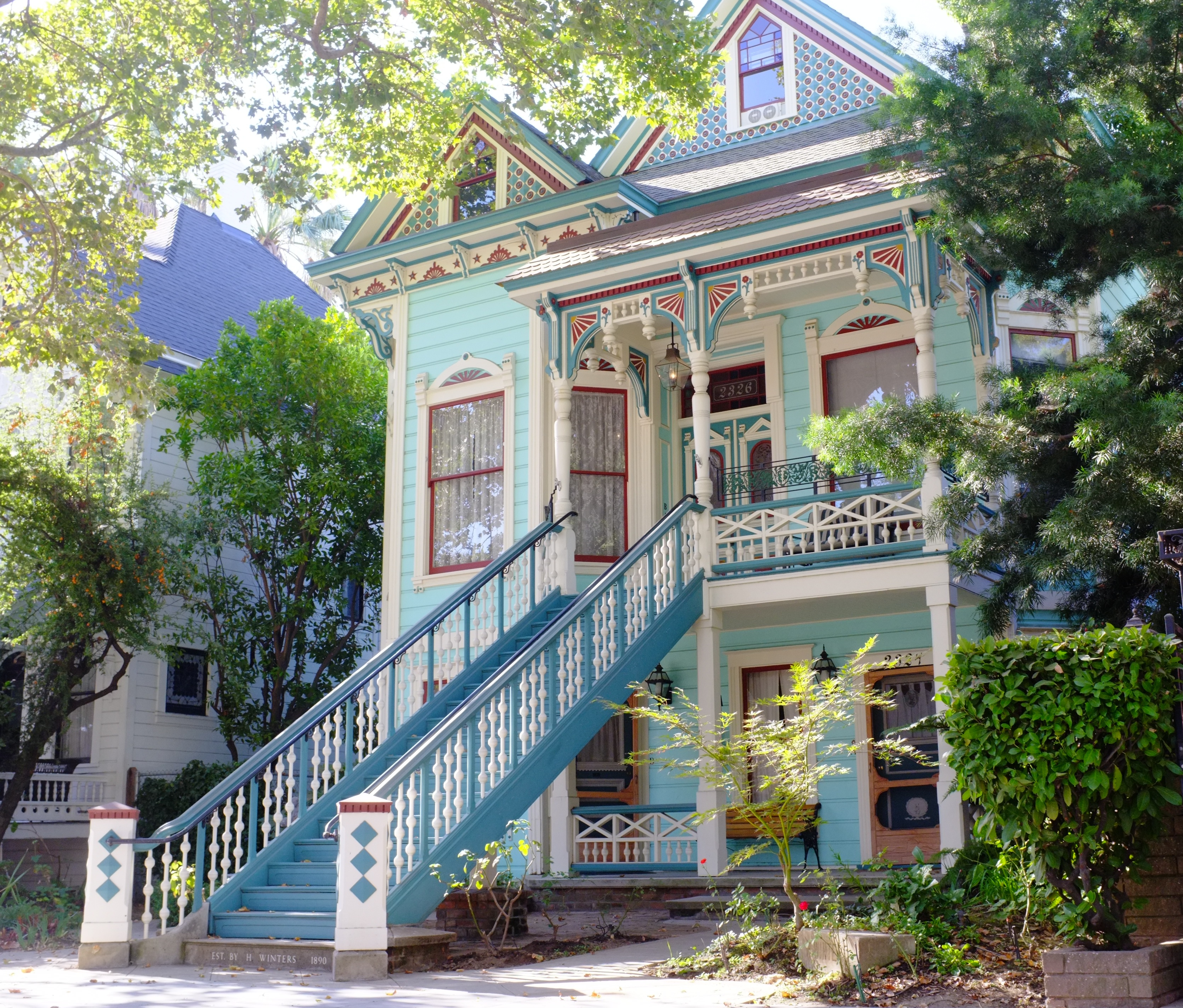
- Winters House facade.

- Location within Sacramento, California Location within California Location within the United States
- Location: 2324 and 2326 H St., Sacramento, California
- Coordinates: 38°34′39″N 121°28′23″W
- Built: 1890
- Architectural style: Queen Anne, Stick/Eastlake
- NRHP reference No.: 98001634
- Added to NRHP: January 25, 1999

Winters House is a historic house in Sacramento, California. It is a Victorian era Stick/Eastlake Queen Anne style wooden residence built in 1890 by businessman Herman Winters.

It was listed on the National Register of Historic Places in 1999.

== See also ==
- History of Sacramento, California
- National Register of Historic Places listings in Sacramento County, California
- California Historical Landmarks in Sacramento County, California
