= Lawrence Warehouse =

Historic warehouse in Sacramento, California

- U.S. National Register of Historic Places
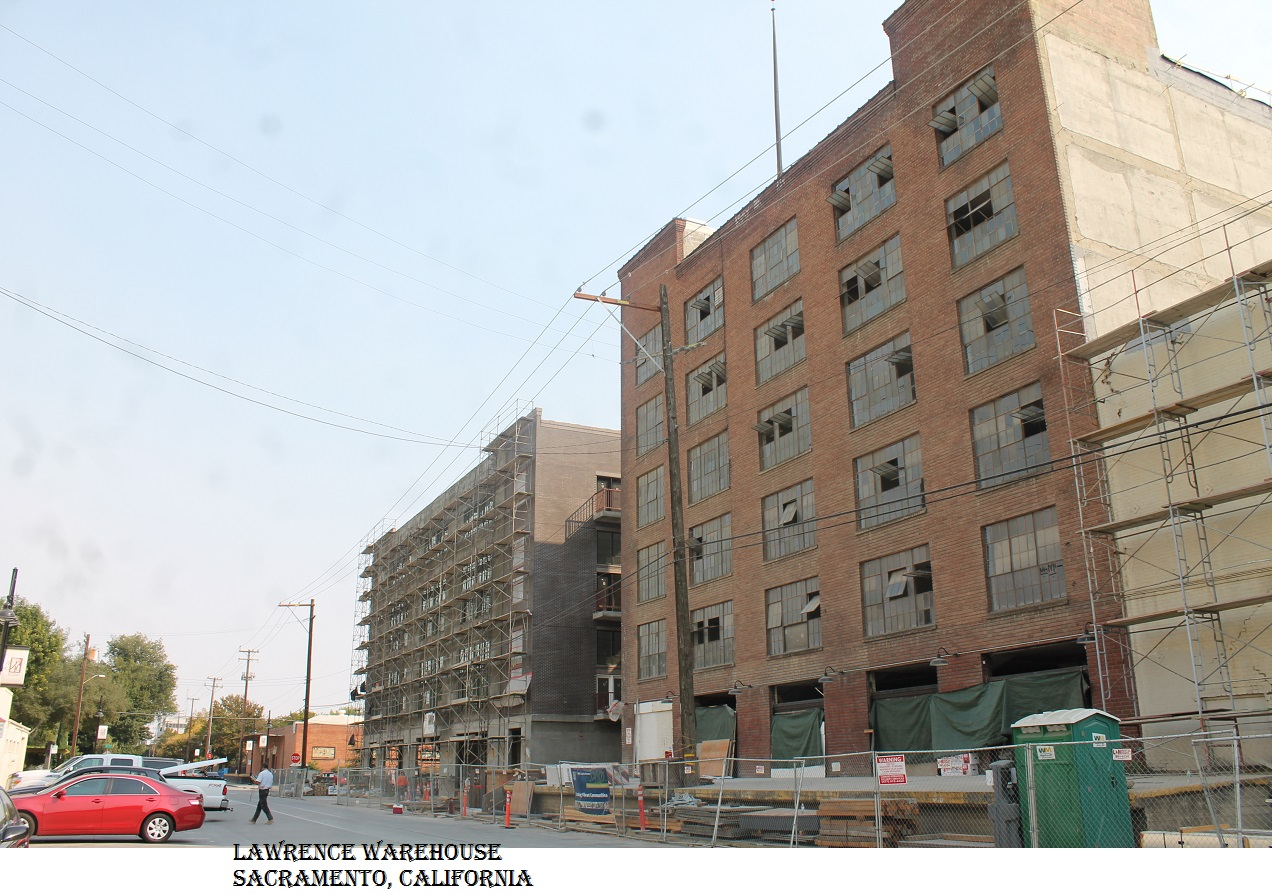

- Location within Sacramento, California Location within California Location within the United States
- Location: 1108 R St., Sacramento, California
- Coordinates: 38°34′15″N 121°29′44″W
- Area: .89 acres (0.36 ha)
- Built: 1914-1915
- Architect: Clarence Cuff
- Architectural style: Prairie School
- NRHP reference No.: 13001067
- Added to NRHP: January 15, 2014

The Lawrence Warehouse, located in Sacramento, California is a historic warehouse built between 1914 and 1915 in the Prairie School style. It has since been turned into the Warehouse Artist Lofts, a mixed-use apartment complex with 116 affordable housing units for Sacramento's artist community.

== See also ==
- History of Sacramento, California
- National Register of Historic Places listings in Sacramento County, California
