= Sacramento Bank Building =

Historic building in Downtown Sacramento, California

- U.S. National Register of Historic Places
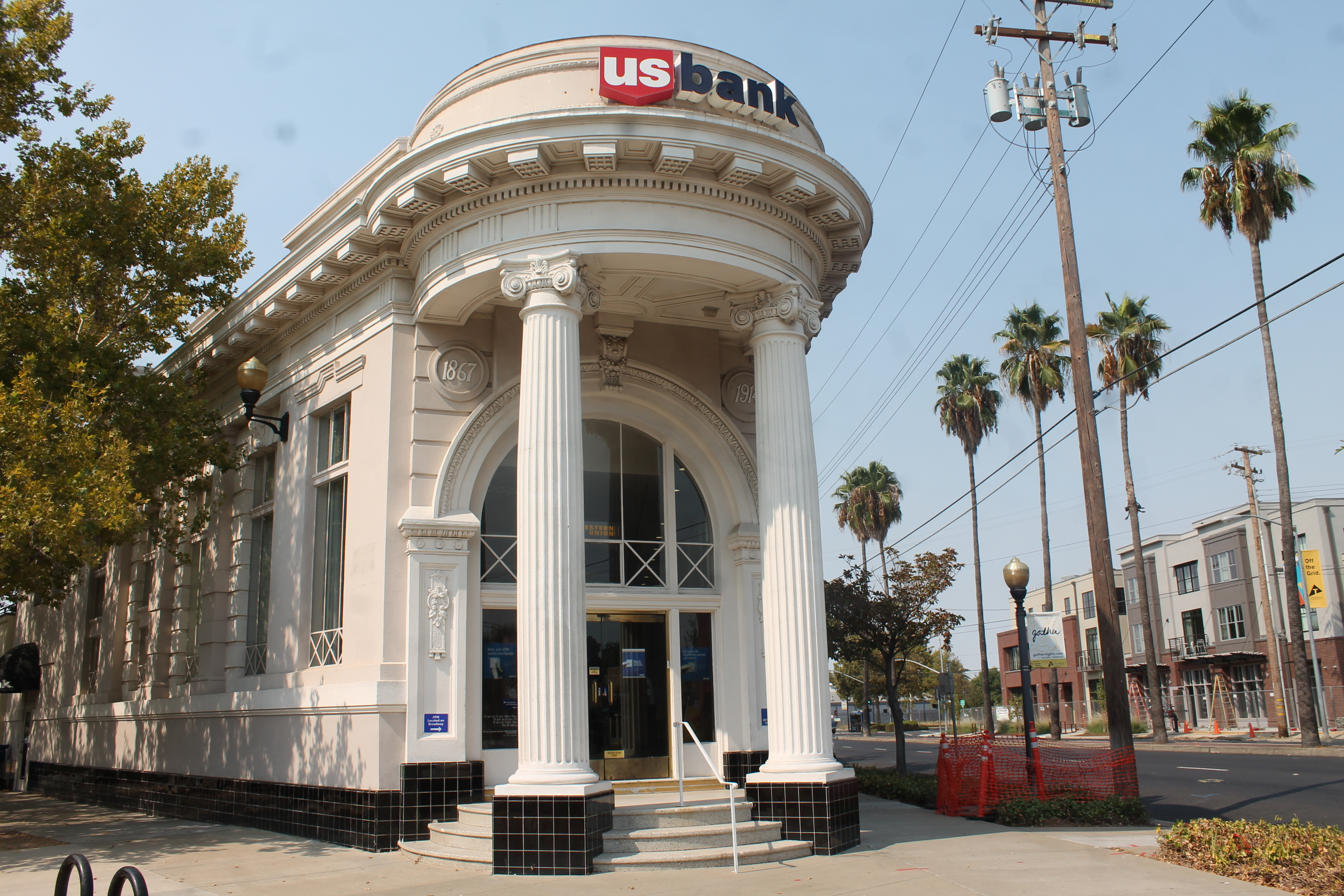

- Location within Sacramento, California Location within California Location within the United States
- Location: 3418 Broadway, Sacramento, California
- Coordinates: 38°33′07.4″N 121°28′09.4″W
- Area: 0.33 acres (0.13 ha)
- Built: 1914
- Architect: Gideon Holt; James Seadler
- Architectural style: Classical Revival
- NRHP reference No.: 82002238
- Added to NRHP: January 21, 1982

The Sacramento Bank Building, listed on the National Register of Historic Places, is a historic bank building located the Oak Park neighborhood of Sacramento, California. The building currently operates as a U.S. Bank branch.

== See also ==
- History of Sacramento, California
- National Register of Historic Places listings in Sacramento County, California
