= Brighton School (Sacramento, California) =

- U.S. National Register of Historic Places
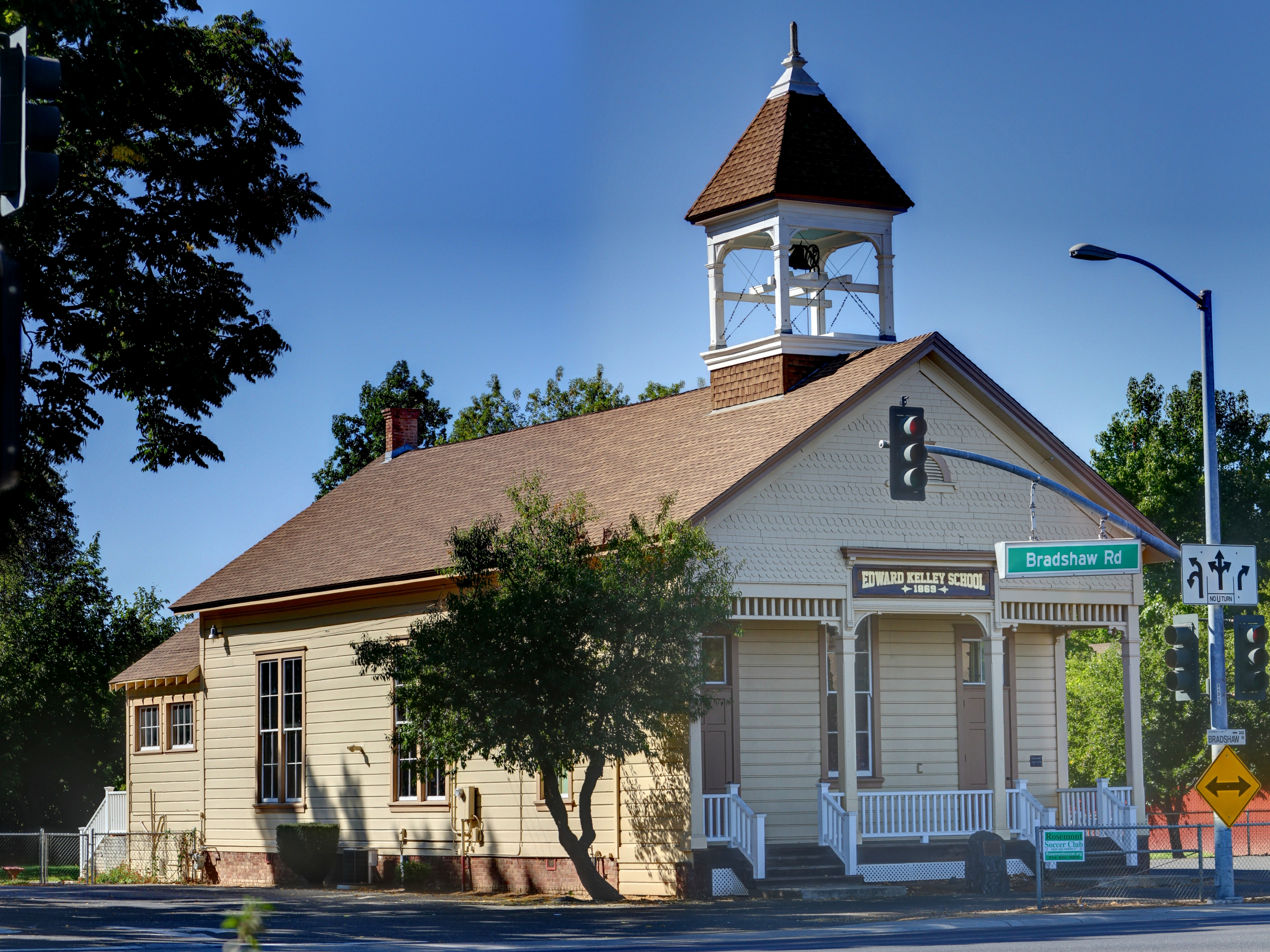

- Location within Sacramento, California Location within California Location within the United States
- Location: 3312 Bradshaw Rd., Sacramento, California
- Coordinates: 38°33′44″N 121°20′9″W
- Area: 1.1 acres (0.45 ha)
- Built: 1869
- NRHP reference No.: 81000168
- Added to NRHP: April 03, 1981

Edward Kelley School (formerly Brighton School) in Sacramento County, California is a building first constructed sometime in the 1850s. The school has been in a district since 1858. It was listed on the National Register of Historic Places in 1981.

The school was originally constructed as a single classroom facility, with a small library, and two foyers. The classroom was later partitioned into three separate rooms to accommodate the growing needs of the developing community. An additional out-building was constructed in the rear of the property, which itself also dates to the 1850s. The school building was almost completely destroyed at least twice during separate fires, once in 1874 and again in 1878. It then caught fire again in 1891, damaging a portion of the structure, and the current facade is a result of the 1891 reconstruction. There is some confusion regarding if the reconstructed work truly represents the original design of the building. A sign above the entryway indicates that the structure was built in 1869.

The building was originally located several miles to the west of its current location, in a part of Sacramento, California once known as Brighton, but is now generally known as East Sacramento, near the location of California State University, Sacramento. In 1924 the school was moved to its current location in what today is known as the unincorporated community of Rosemont, California. A year later the school's name was changed from Brighton School to Edward Kelley School, in honor of the person who had donated the land on which the school now stands. Edward Kelley School is still in use today, primarily as a pre-school. It is the oldest continuously-operating schoolhouse in Sacramento County.

== See also ==
- History of Sacramento, California
- National Register of Historic Places listings in Sacramento County, California
- California Historical Landmarks in Sacramento County, California
