= Sacramento Hall of Justice =

Historic building in Downtown Sacramento, California

- U.S. National Register of Historic Places
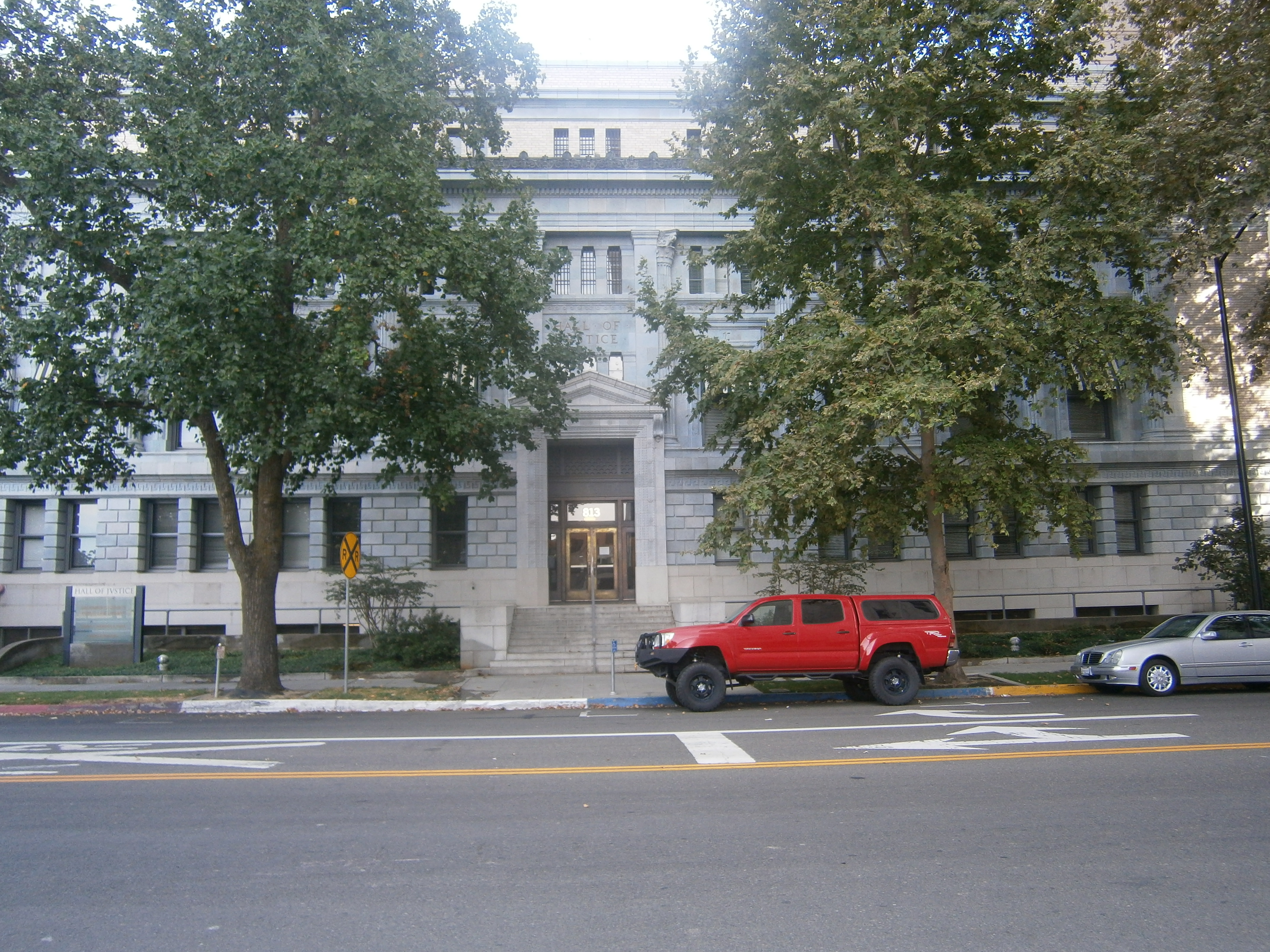

- Location within Sacramento, California Location within California Location within the United States
- Location: 813 6th St., Sacramento, California
- Coordinates: 38°35′01″N 121°29′51.6″W
- Area: 0.43 acres (0.17 ha)
- Built: 1914
- Architect: Shea & Lofquist; H.S. Williams
- Architectural style: Beaux Arts Classicism; Neo-classicism
- NRHP reference No.: 99001179
- Added to NRHP: September 24, 1999

The Sacramento Hall of Justice, listed on the National Register of Historic Places, is a historic building located in Sacramento, California. It is a premiere local example of Beaux Arts Classicism. The inspiration for the building comes from local architect Rudolph Herold, who sought the contract for the Hall of Justice, as well as the City Beautiful movement during the early 20th century. Shea & Lofquist were awarded the contract and their design was required to be compatible with the Herold-designed Sacramento County Courthouse at Seventh and I streets.

== See also ==
- History of Sacramento, California
- National Register of Historic Places listings in Sacramento County, California
