= Alta Mesa Farm Bureau Hall =

- U.S. National Register of Historic Places
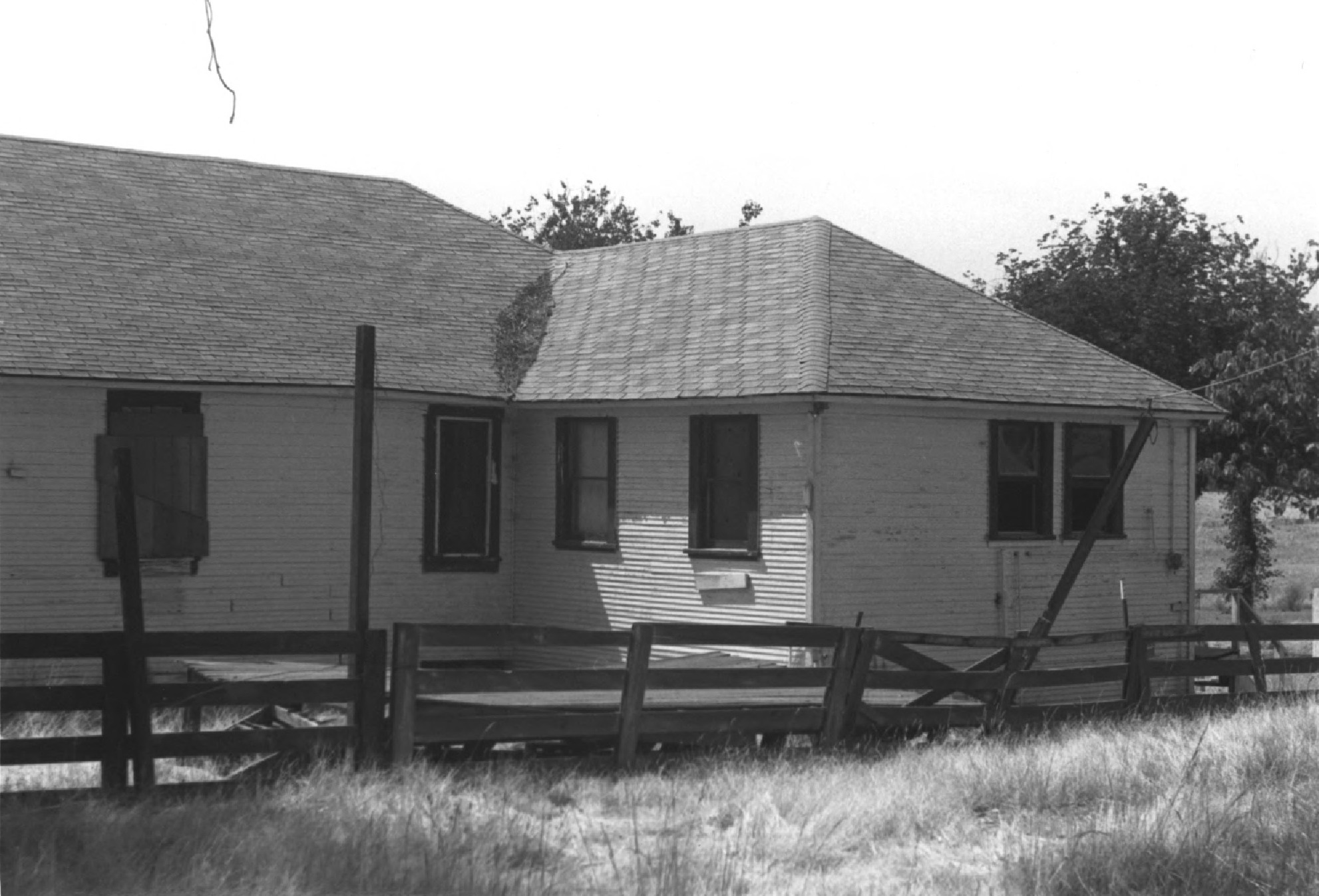
- The historic Alta Mesa Farm Bureau Hall (built 1913), formerly located at 10195 Alta Mesa Road near Wilton, California, United States, is listed on the US National Register of Historic Places. The hall was destroyed by fire in 1987.

- Location within California Location within the United States
- Nearest city: Wilton, California
- Coordinates: 38°23′14″N 121°13′20″W
- Area: 0.6 acres (0.24 ha)
- Built: 1913
- NRHP reference No.: 86003577
- Added to NRHP: January 7, 1987

The Alta Mesa Farm Bureau Hall in Wilton, California was listed on the National Register of Historic Places in 1987.

It was a one-story wood-frame building. It was built in 1913 and expanded by addition of a kitchen wing into an L-shape in 1930.

The hall was destroyed by fire in 1987, although the detached restroom building still stood as of June 2014.

== See also ==
- National Register of Historic Places listings in Sacramento County, California
- California Historical Landmarks in Sacramento County, California
