= Julius Wetzlar House =

Historic house in California, United States

- U.S. National Register of Historic Places
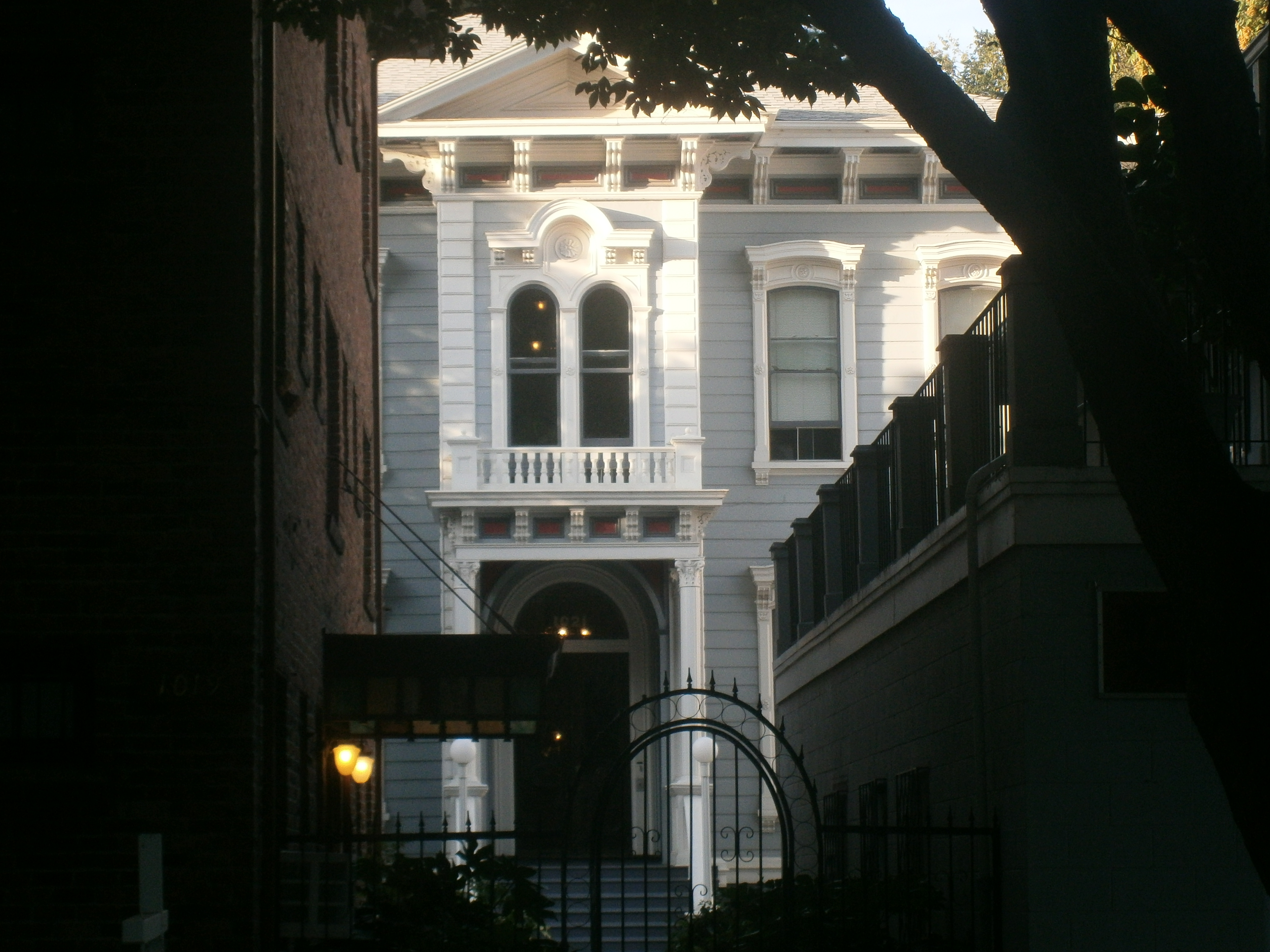

- Location within Sacramento, California Location within California Location within the United States
- Location: 1021 H St., Sacramento, California
- Coordinates: 38°34′58.2″N 121°29′29.7″W
- Area: .367 acres (0.149 ha)
- Built: 1871
- Architectural style: Italianate
- NRHP reference No.: 83001226
- Added to NRHP: March 31, 1983

The Julius Wetzlar House located in Sacramento, California is a historic house built in 1871 and designed in an Italianate style.

== History ==
It was built by one of Sacramento's founders, German immigrant Julius Wetzlar. He served as insurance broker, real estate agent, trustee of the Sacramento Valley Bank, and manager of Home Mutual Insurance Co. The house was owned by several different people in the next two decades. First by Stephen Boutwell, retired sheep raiser and an early member of the Sacramento Pioneer Association in 1879–1880, then by Judge Samuel Denson in 1889 and Amos P. Catlin in 1891. Catlin was an early state legislator and was instrumental in Sacramento becoming the capital of California. He also developed large holdings of Sacramento real estate.
