= PG&E Powerhouse =

Historic building in California, United States

- U.S. National Register of Historic Places
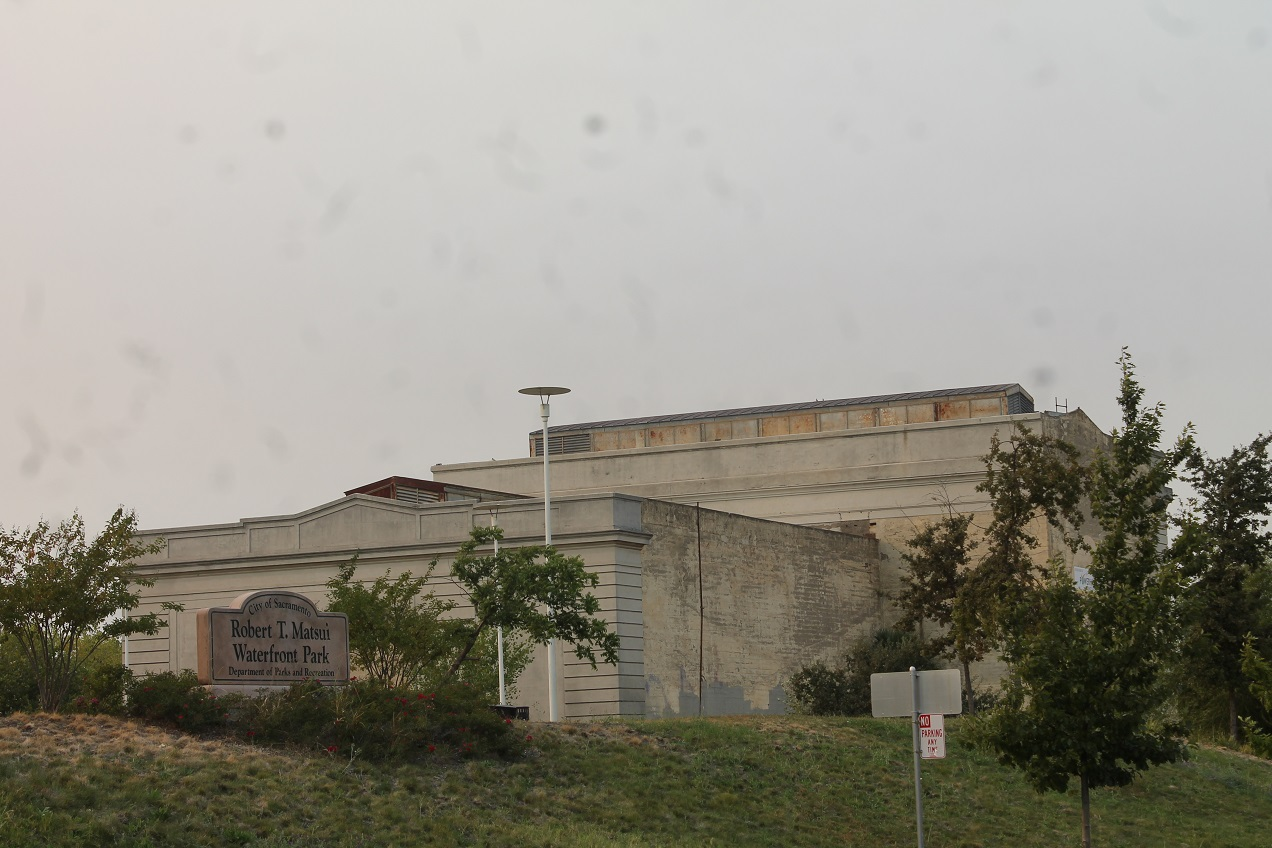

- Location within Sacramento, California Location within California Location within the United States
- Location: 400 Jibboom St., Sacramento, California
- Coordinates: 38°35′36.4″N 121°30′20.2″W
- Area: 1.925 acres (0.779 ha)
- Built: 1912
- Architect: Willis Polk
- Architectural style: Classical Revival; Beaux-Arts architecture
- NRHP reference No.: 10000774
- Added to NRHP: September 23, 2010

PG&E Powerhouse, also known as Sacramento River Station B, is a historic building located in Sacramento, California, constructed in 1912 by notable architect Willis Polk. Originally used by Pacific Gas and Electric PG&E as an auxiliary power plant and transformer substation, it played a key role in transforming voltage for distribution.

In 1924, PG&E upgraded the facility, making it the largest steam turbine power plant in the region. However, in 1957, PG&E sold the building, and its interior was stripped of all metal components and equipment, leaving behind a large open space.

In November 2021, the building became home to the SMUD Museum of Science and Curiosity (MOSAC) as part of a $40.8 million redevelopment project.

== See also ==
- Sacramento, California
