= Theodore Judah School =

- Judah, Theodore, School
- U.S. National Register of Historic Places
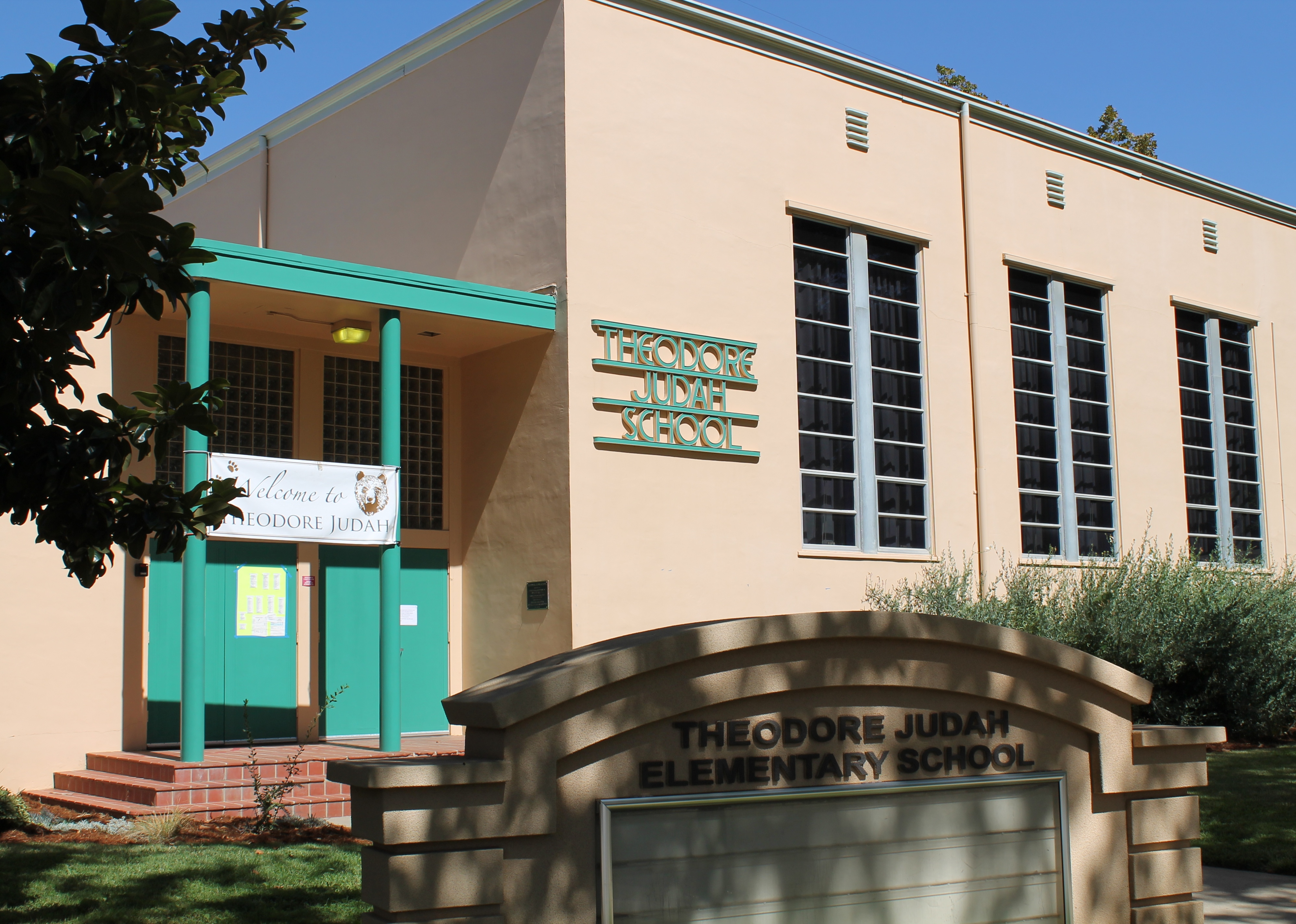

- Location within Sacramento, California Location within California Location within the United States
- Location: 3919 McKinley Blvd., Sacramento, California
- Coordinates: 38°34′38.3″N 121°27′05.2″W
- Area: 1.8 acres (0.73 ha)
- Built: 1939
- Architect: Keating, William C.; Dean, Charles F.
- Architectural style: Moderne
- NRHP reference No.: 97000810
- Added to NRHP: July 25, 1997

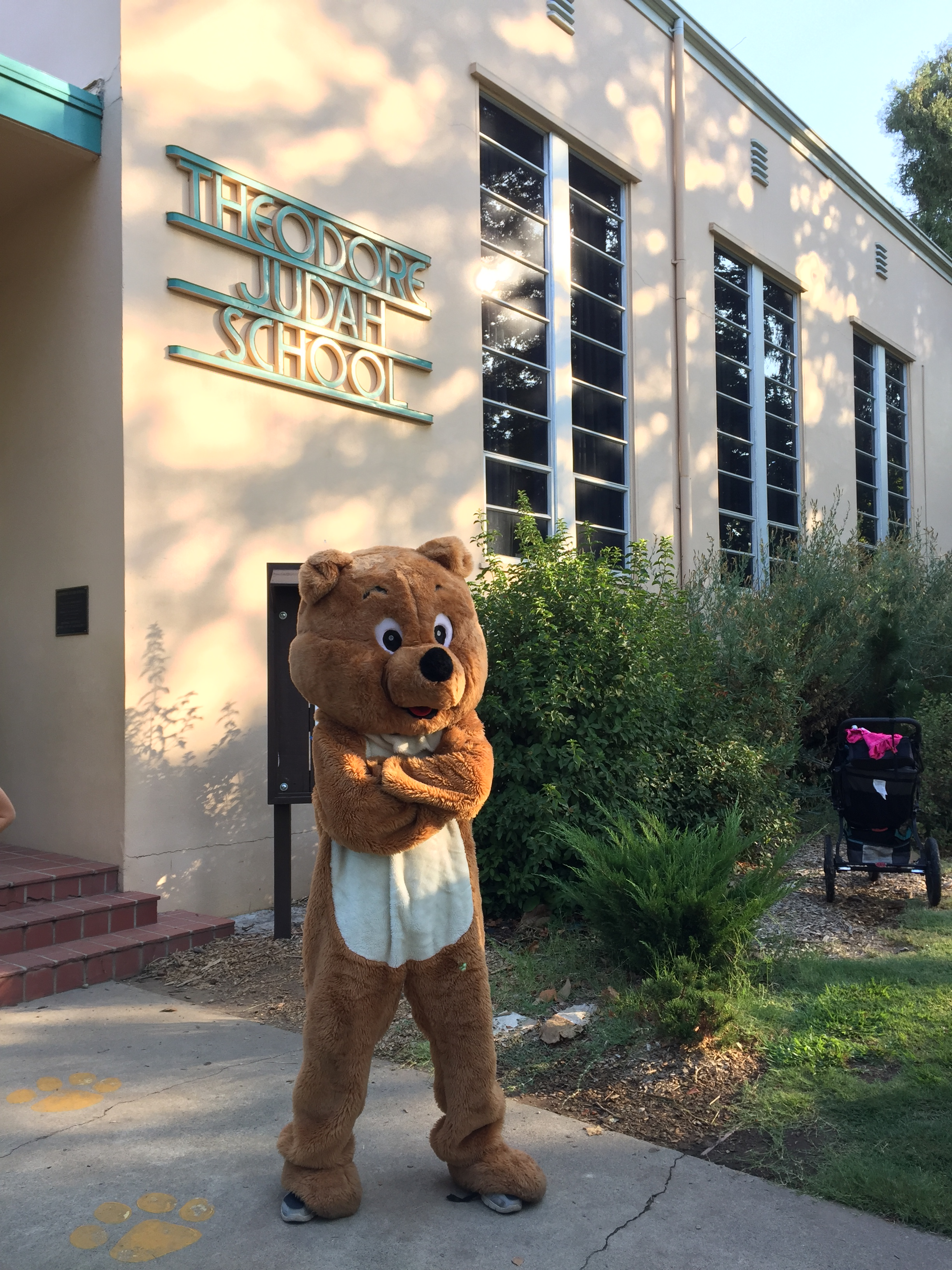
Theodore Judah Elementary Mascot, Teddy

Theodore Judah School is a historic elementary school located in Sacramento, California. The 1937 edifice is the last standing PWA school in the city.

== History ==
The school opened in 1927 in a "one-room wooden bungalow" and was called the David Lubin Annex, with only a handful of children and a short-term teacher. The same year, the school was enlarged into a K-6 setting and given the name Theodore Judah School, presumably after Theodore Judah, who helped design the first First transcontinental railroad. In 1937, the Public Works Administration began constructing a permanent building for the school and finished in 1939.

Using the fact that it is the oldest continuously operated school in the city, as well as arguing its architectural significance, community members and school administration successfully petitioned the City of Sacramento to have the school placed on the city's historic register in 1994. In maintaining the building's original look and feel, the Sacramento City Unified School District brought in a specialist to determine the original paint colors of the building when the building was repainted in 1995.

In 1997, the school gained placement on the National Register of Historic Places, due to its architectural design, after a seven-year-long effort on the behalf of community members.
