= Slocum House (Fair Oaks, California) =

Historic house in California, United States

- U.S. National Register of Historic Places
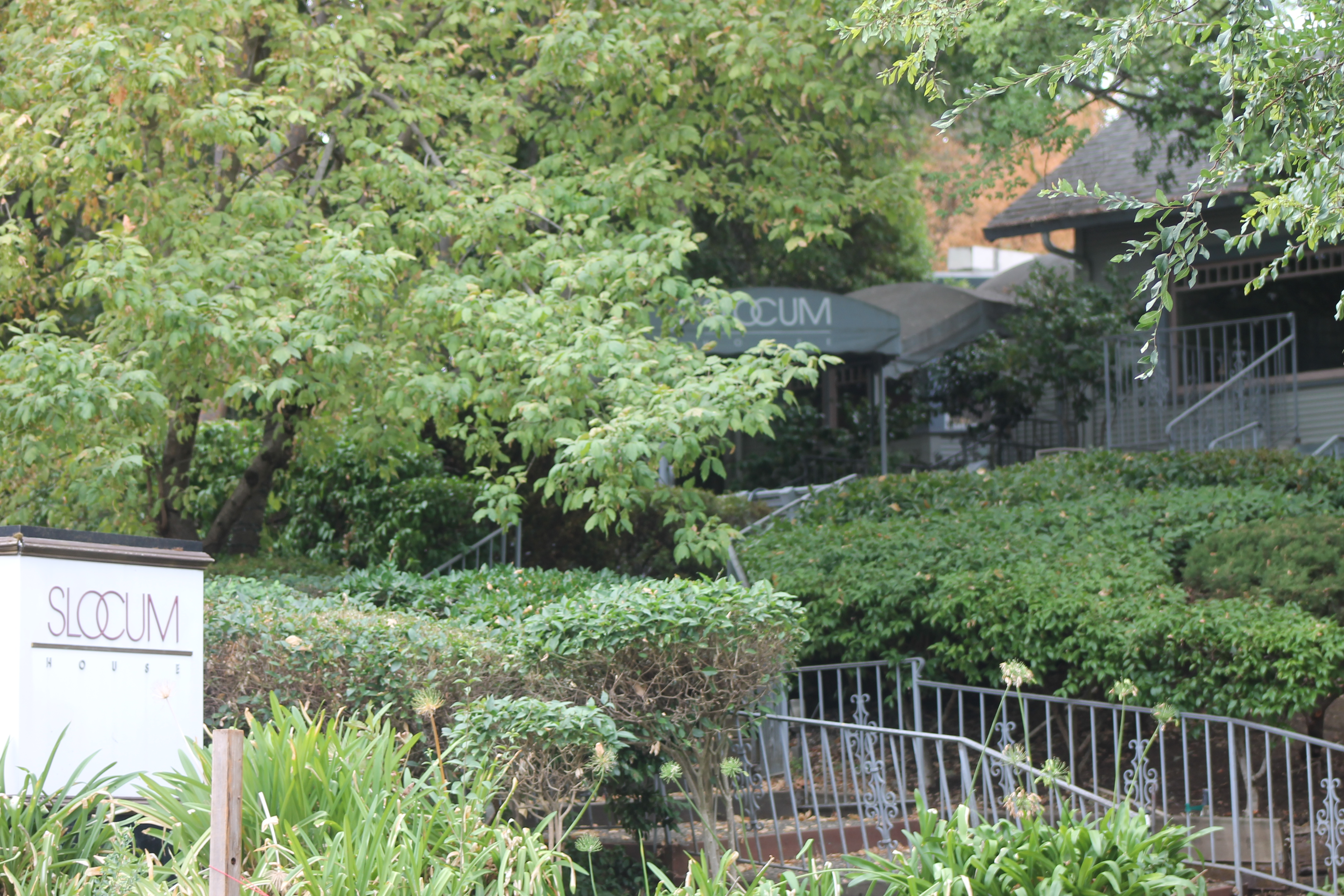

- Location within California Location within the United States
- Location: 7992 California Ave., Fair Oaks, California
- Coordinates: 38°38′29″N 121°16′05″W
- Area: .87 acres (0.35 ha)
- Built: 1924
- Architect: Arthur Broadley
- Architectural style: California bungalow
- NRHP reference No.: 79000520
- Added to NRHP: January 31, 1979

The Slocum House located in Fair Oaks, California, is a historic building designed and built by Arthur Broadley in 1924 in the California bungalow architectural style for Charles Henry and Sara Ann Slocum.

== History ==
Charles Slocum settled in Fair Oaks from Iowa on December 23, 1896, just a year after the first settlers arrived on November 20, 1895. He was a businessman who ran the Slocum and Gore General Merchandise Store and established the Fair Oaks Bank in 1912. Slocum worked there as a cashier and manager until his death on July 19, 1925.

The Slocum House operated as a restaurant from 1977 to 1985. The restaurant was bought and reopened in 1986 by Kerry Kassis, whose father Frank Kassis owned and operated the Sacramento grocery chain Stop-N-Shop and developed the Arden Fair shopping mall with his brothers. By 1991, the Slocum House featured a high-end menu that blended California produce with Italian and French cuisine. The restaurant closed in 2011 due to the economic downturn. In 2018, it was purchased by local brewpub owner Gary Juels. As of March 2026, the building is undergoing restoration work, with plans to reopen as a restaurant. A construction permit for an outdoor patio was approved by Sacramento County.
