= Coolot Company Building =

- U.S. National Register of Historic Places
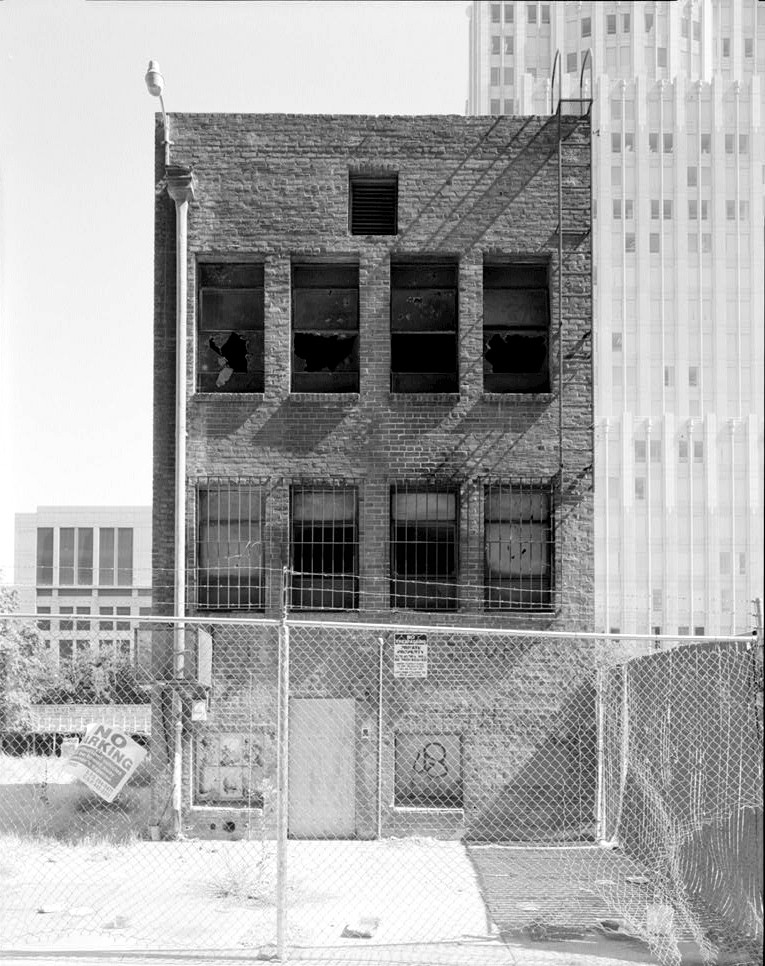

- Location within Sacramento, California Location within California Location within the United States
- Location: 812 J St., Sacramento, California
- Coordinates: 38°34′51″N 121°29′41″W
- Area: 0.5 acres (0.20 ha)
- Built: 1920
- Architectural style: Bungalow/Craftsman, California Arts and Crafts
- NRHP reference No.: 78000742
- Added to NRHP: September 20, 1978

The Coolot Company Building was a historic commercial building located at 812 J Street in Sacramento, California.

== Description and history ==
The building was originally built in 1861 by Leland Stanford and he used one of the rooms as his office. It was also a part of the tunnel system as a part of the raised level of buildings in Sacramento. Replete with 25 office suites in the early 1990s, the edifice was still in use while neighboring buildings had all been demolished. After this point, the building itself was the subject of many fires during its years of vacancy. While plans were considered to incorporate the facade of the old building with new construction planned at its site, one last fire seriously damaged it in 2003 and it was subsequently demolished.

It was listed on the National Register of Historic Places on September 20, 1978.
