= Merrium Apartments =

- U.S. National Register of Historic Places
- West facade of the building

- Location within Sacramento, California Location within California Location within the United States
- Location: 1017 14th St., Sacramento, California
- Coordinates: 38°34′41″N 121°29′12″W
- Area: less than one acre
- Built: 1913
- Architect: Cuff, Clarence Cecil
- Architectural style: Late 19th And Early 20th Century American Movements, Prairie School, Sullivanesque
- NRHP reference No.: 90001386
- Added to NRHP: September 13, 1990

The Merrium Apartments, listed on the National Register of Historic Places, was a historic building located in Downtown Sacramento, California.

== History ==
The building was built in 1912 or 1913 by attorney Chauncey H. Dunn and named after his wife, Merrium. The building housed 42 units complete with an icehouse in the basement and two elevators. It had many modern conveniences that were touted at the time of its opening, including the free ice, free telephone service, and close proximity to the business district.

In 1987, the City of Sacramento, motivated by the desire to expand the Sacramento Convention Center, made plans to demolish many buildings that were in the area bounded by 14th and 15th streets and J and K streets, which included the Merrium Apartments. In an effort to save the building, the Sacramento Old City Association nominated the building for historic status knowing that the city could still decide to demolish it. After being designated a historic building soon after the nomination, city officials did not change their plans. Preservationists proposed moving the building to another site but it was deemed too costly at an estimated $3.5 million. A local company volunteered to demolish the building for free in exchange for the materials it could salvage from it. In a last effort to save the building, the Sacramento Old City Associated took the matters to an appellate court to stop the razing. The court ruled that the association had no standing and so it was appealed and taken to the California Supreme Court. The Supreme Court declined to review the case and the stay of the demolition was lifted.

The building was finally destroyed on September 4, 1991. The demolition company salvaged some of the bricks and other materials and the City of Sacramento saved all the materials for an entire apartment to one day be reconstructed in a museum.
