= Rosebud Ranch =

- U.S. National Register of Historic Places
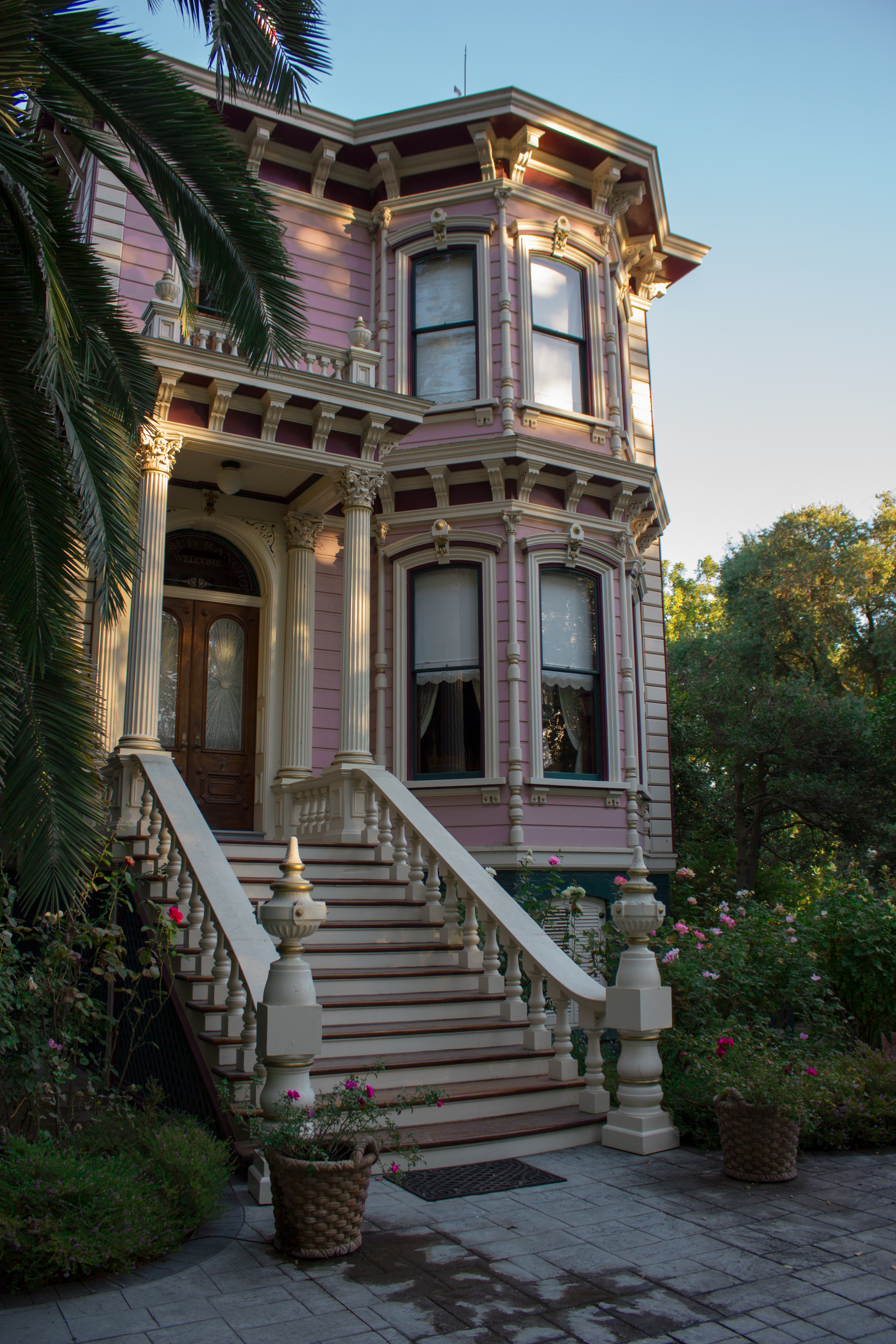

- Location within California Location within the United States
- Nearest city: Hood, California
- Coordinates: 38°23′8″N 121°30′46″W
- Area: 3.8 acres (1.5 ha)
- Built: 1877
- Built by: William Johnston
- Architect: Nathaniel Johnson
- Architectural style: Italianate
- NRHP reference No.: 79000521
- Added to NRHP: December 31, 1979

The Rosebud Ranch is a historic ranch on the National Register of Historic Places located near Hood, California, south of Sacramento.

Built c. 1877 by William Johnston, the property reportedly stretched over two miles of the Sacramento River front and encompassed 1,200 acres (490 ha). Johnston used his property to grow vegetables, fruit, grain, as well as use for grazing and as a dairy farm.

In recent years the home has held public tours led by the Elk Grove Historical Society.
