= Edward P. Howe Jr. House =

Historic house in California, United States

- U.S. National Register of Historic Places
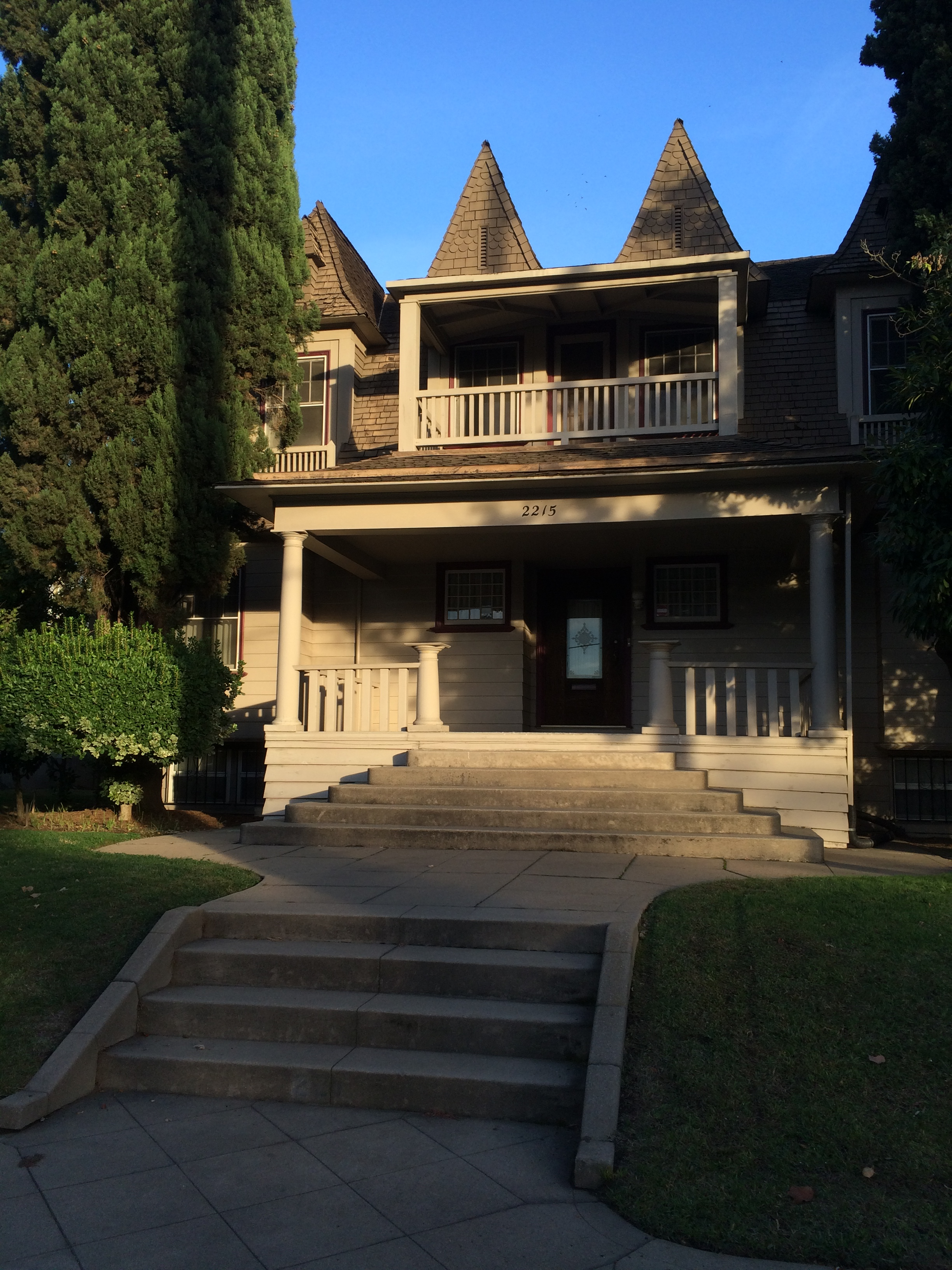

- Location within Sacramento, California Location within California Location within the United States
- Location: 2215 21st St., Sacramento, California
- Coordinates: 38°33′45.44″N 121°29′3.27″W
- Area: less than 1 acre
- Built: 1903
- Architectural style: Colonial Revival; Shingle Style
- NRHP reference No.: 82002232
- Added to NRHP: February 19, 1982

The Edward P. Howe Jr. House located in Sacramento, California is a historic house built in 1903 in a Colonial Revival and Shingle Style design. Edward P. Howe Jr., who operated Howe's Academy and Business School from 1884 to 1915, built the house in 1903. It is now used as an office.
