= Murer House and Gardens =

Historic house in California, United States

- U.S. National Register of Historic Places
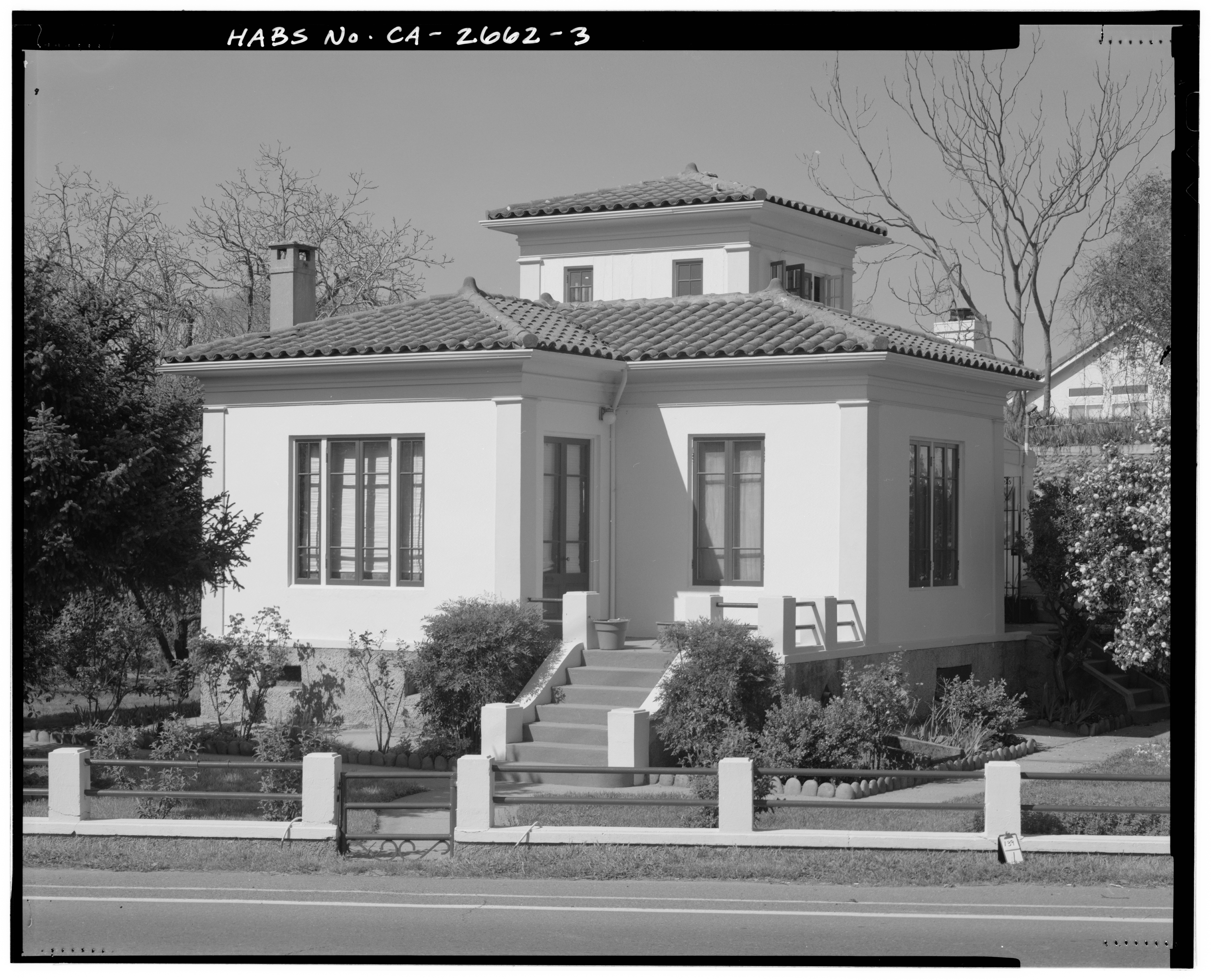
- Southeast frontage of the house

- Location within California Location within the United States
- Interactive map showing the location of Murer House and Gardens
- Location: 1125 Joe Murer Ct., Folsom, California
- Coordinates: 38°40′24.32″N 121°10′56.25″W
- Area: 1 acre (0.40 ha)
- Built: 1927
- Architect: Guiseppe Murer
- Architectural style: Italian Renaissance
- NRHP reference No.: 100007367
- Added to NRHP: January 21, 2022

The Murer House and Gardens in Folsom, California is a building, designed and built by Giuseppe Murer in the Italian Renaissance architecture style, built in 1927. The house currently operates as a museum, and showcases the history of Italian immigration to the US and the early formation of Folsom.

The Murer House and Gardens was listed on the National Register of Historic Places in 2022.
