= Sutter Club =

Historic building in California, United States

- U.S. National Register of Historic Places
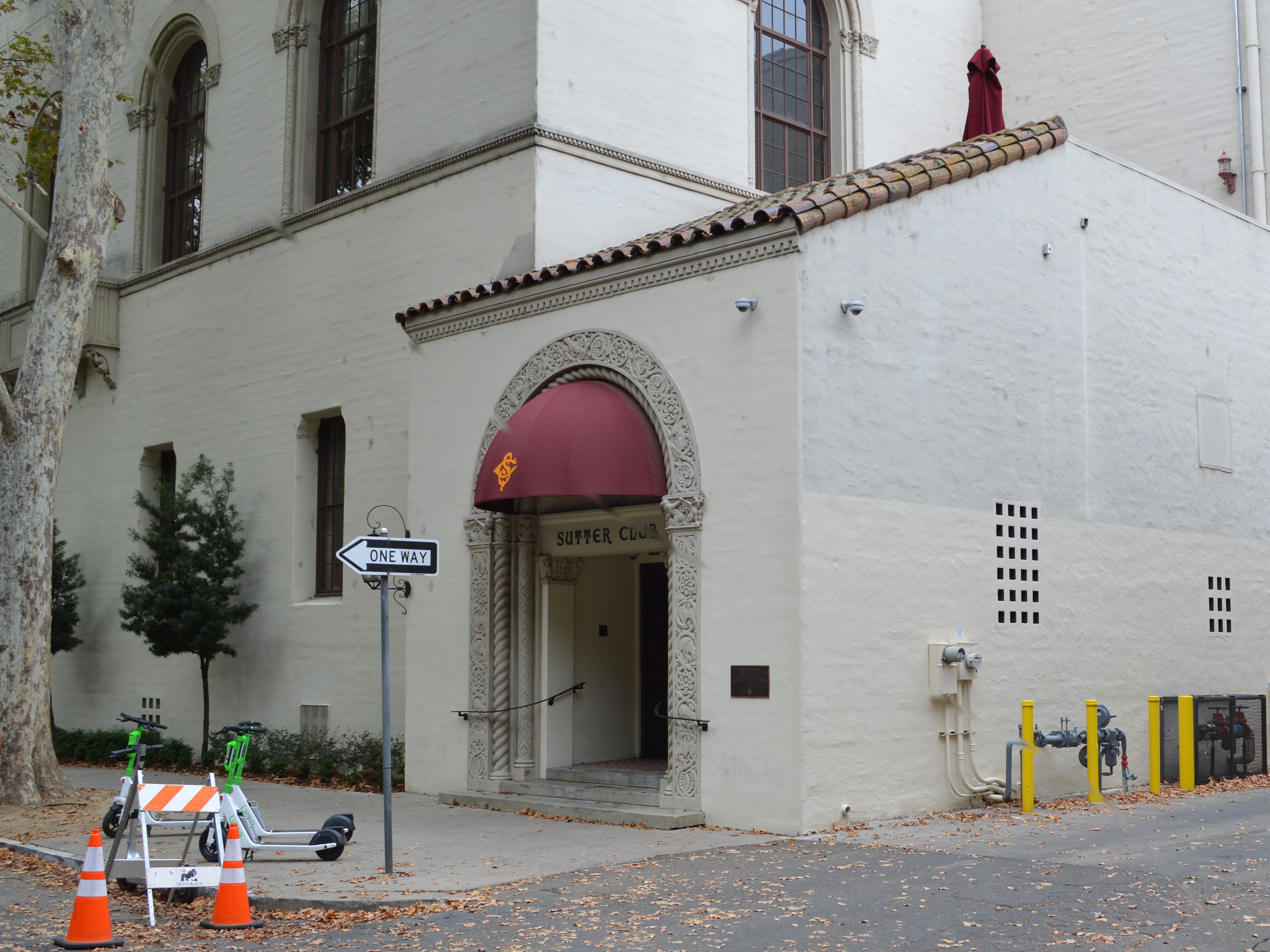

- Location within Sacramento, California Location within California Location within the United States
- Location: 1220 9th Street, Sacramento, California
- Coordinates: 38°34′40.2″N 121°29′47.1″W
- Area: .33 acres (0.13 ha)
- Built: 1930
- Architect: Dean & Dean; Starks & Flanders
- Architectural style: Mediterranean; Spanish Eclectic
- NRHP reference No.: 100000951
- Added to NRHP: May 8, 2017

The Sutter Club is a historic building located in Sacramento, California constructed in 1930 in a Spanish Eclectic style. It was recognized as a Sacramento landmark in 1982. Designed by local architecture firms Dean & Dean and Starks & Flanders, it draws from Mediterranean and Spanish architectural styles. The Sutter Club was formed in 1889 to provide a social outlet for successful Sacramento merchants and professional men. The club is among the oldest social clubs in California.

The club operates under laws for 501(c)(7) Social and Recreation Clubs; in 2025 it claimed total revenue of $5,794,353 and total assets of $8,979,811. The separate Sutter Club Foundation for preservation of the architecture and history of the club is a 501(c)(3) public charity. In 2024, it claimed total assets of $115,044 and total revenue of $324,806.

== See also ==
- Sacramento, California
- List of gentlemen's clubs in the United States
