= Brewster Building (Galt, California) =

- U.S. National Register of Historic Places
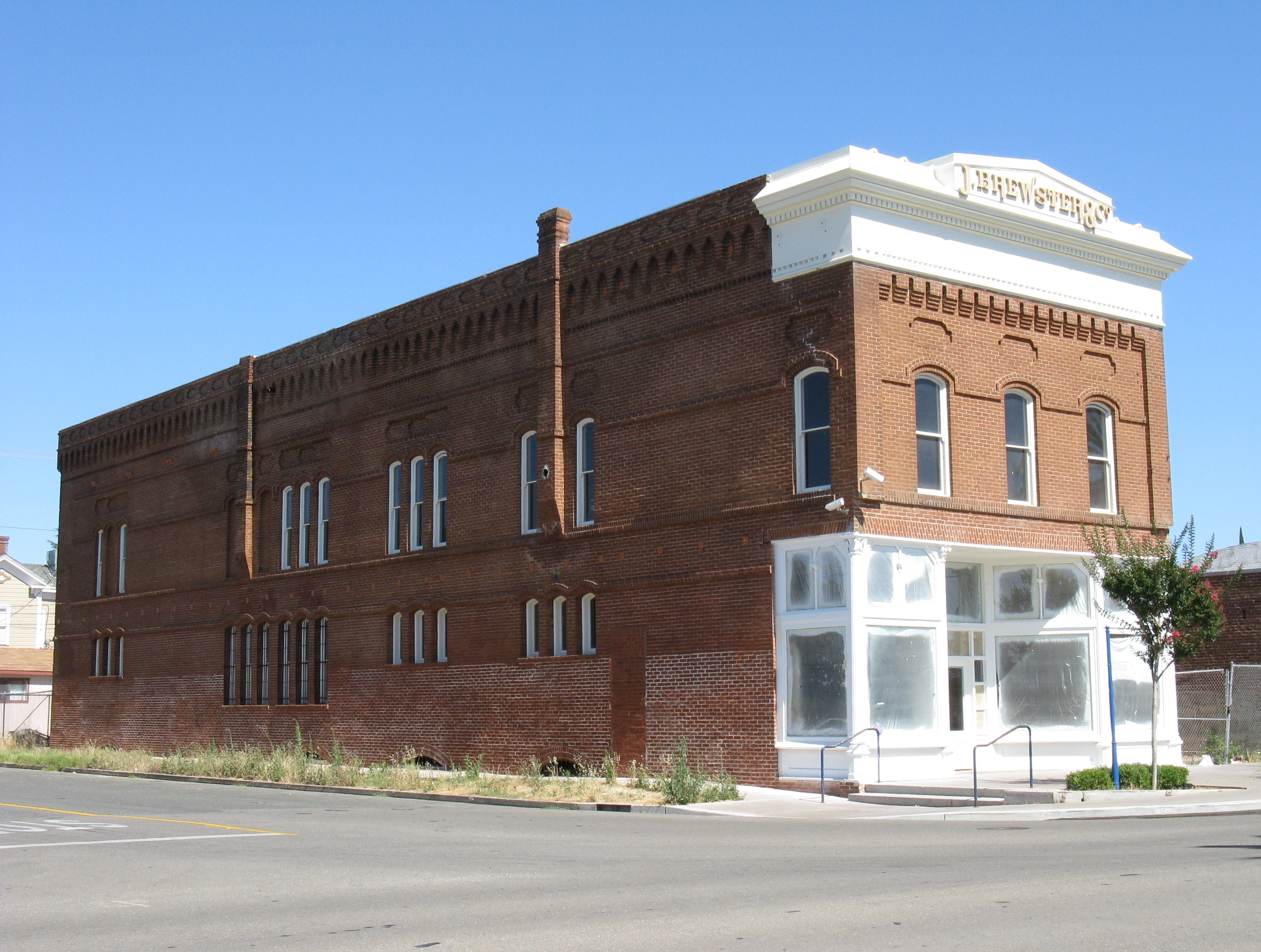
- The Brewster Building, or Galt IOOF—Oddfellows Hall (following restoration).

- Location within California Location within the United States
- Location: 201 4th St., Galt, California
- Coordinates: 38°15′13″N 121°21′42″W
- Area: 0.2 acres (0.081 ha)
- Built: 1882
- Architect: Hamilton, William H.
- Architectural style: Italianate
- NRHP reference No.: 00000981
- Added to NRHP: August 16, 2000

The Brewster Building (also known as Galt Mercantile or the Sawyer Building) is a historic commercial building and IOOF Hall located at 201 Fourth Street in Galt, California. It was built in 1882 and was listed on the National Register of Historic Places in 2000.

It is a two-story, Italianate style commercial building with a brick veneer exterior. It is about 30 by 125 feet (9.1 m × 38.1 m) in plan. Its first floor and basement were originally occupied by John Brewster & Co.; a Masonic Hall and offices used the second floor. It served a Masonic lodge at first, and later served an Odd Fellows lodge. The main meeting hall room, at the rear of the second floor, is 28 by 50 feet (8.5 m × 15.2 m) in size, and 22 feet (6.7 m) high, with an open truss ceiling.

== See also ==
- Independent Order of Odd Fellows
- National Register of Historic Places listings in Sacramento County, California
- California Historical Landmarks in Sacramento County, California
