= Southern Pacific Railroad Section Superintendent House =

Historic house in California, United States

- U.S. National Register of Historic Places
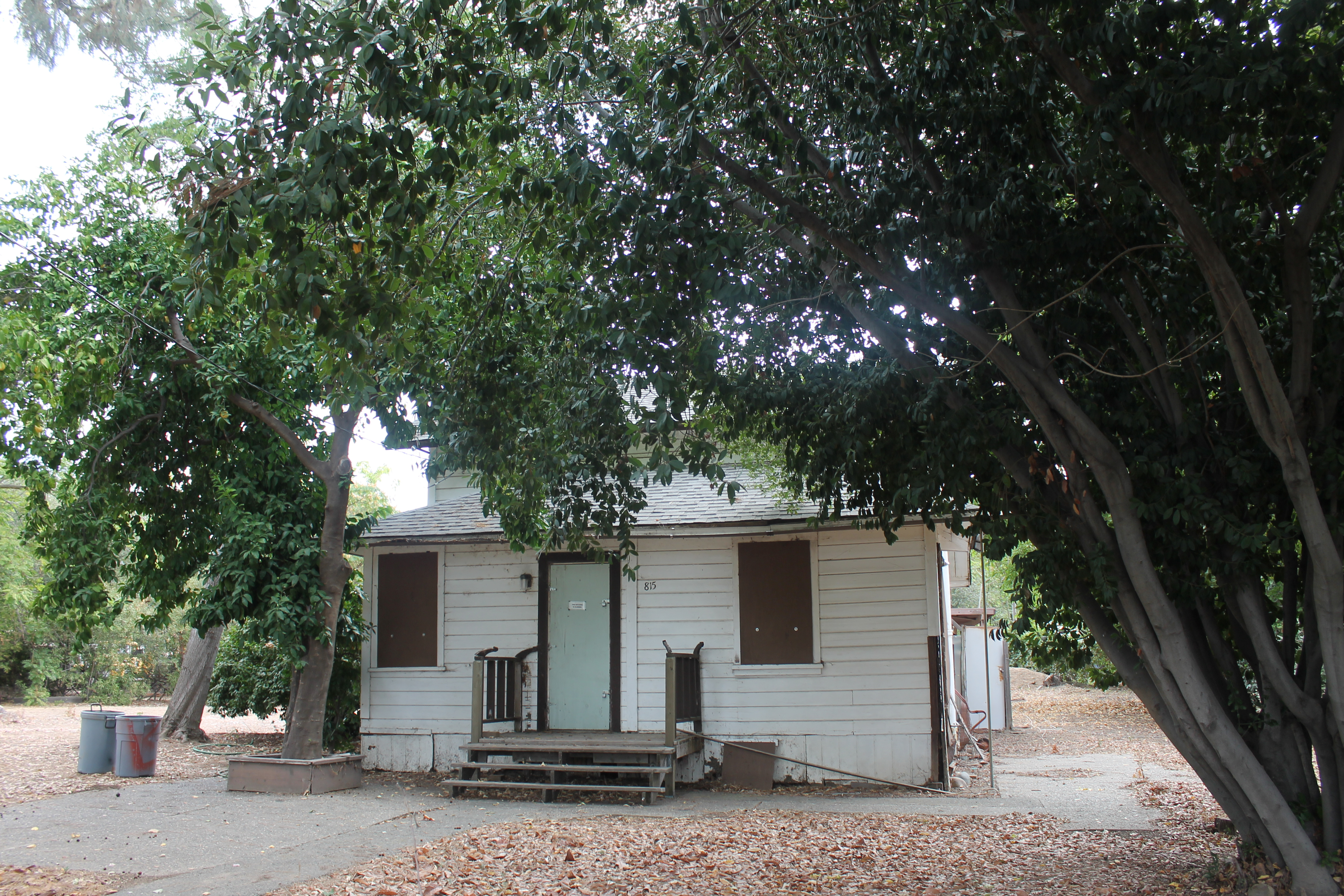

- Location within California Location within the United States
- Location: 815 Oakdale St., Folsom, California
- Coordinates: 38°40′11″N 121°10′55″W
- Area: less than 1 acre
- Built: 1915
- Architectural style: Bungalow / Craftsman
- NRHP reference No.: 08000501
- Added to NRHP: June 13, 2008

The Southern Pacific Railroad Section Superintendent House located in Folsom, California is a historic company housing building built by the Southern Pacific Railroad for the section superintendent and his family that oversaw the Folsom junction railroad operations. The house was in use as the superintendent's house until the 1950, and as a residence until 2002.
