= Eastern Star Hall =

- U.S. National Register of Historic Places
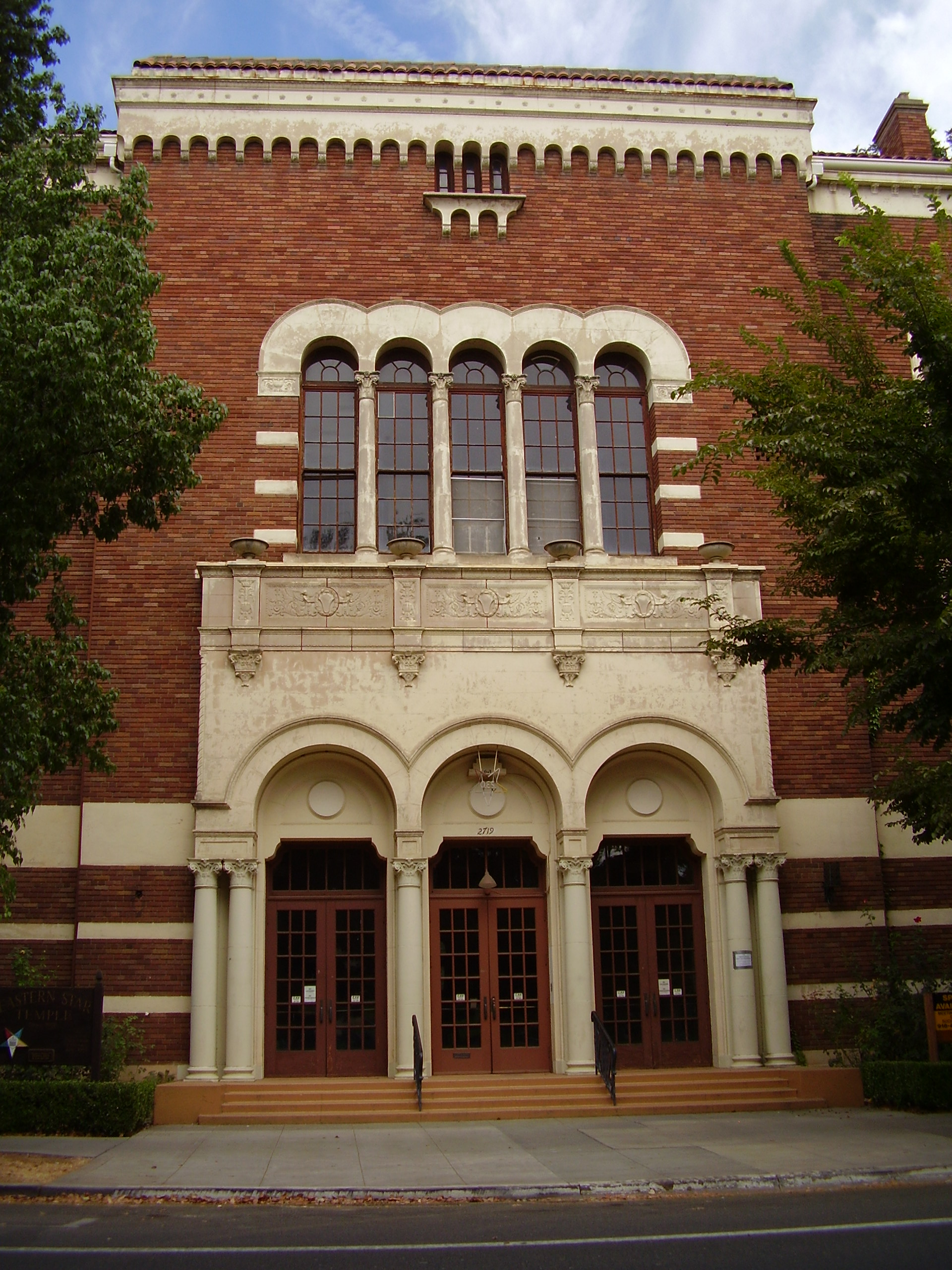

- Location within Sacramento, California Location within California Location within the United States
- Location: 2719 K St., Sacramento, California
- Coordinates: 38°34′21″N 121°28′22″W
- Area: less than one acre
- Built: 1928
- Architect: Coffman, Salsbury & Stafford; L. Frederick Gould
- Architectural style: Romanesque
- NRHP reference No.: 92001757
- Added to NRHP: January 7, 1993

The Eastern Star Hall in Sacramento, California is a building from 1928. It was listed on the National Register of Historic Places in 1993.

Sacramento's Eastern Star Hall was built in 1928 as a meeting hall for the Order of the Eastern Star, a Masonic women's organization. It is one of only four buildings constructed for the Eastern Star organization, and the only one still surviving and in active use. The building was listed in the National Register of Historic Places as a fine example of Romanesque Revival architecture, and a rare example of a local building devoted to a women's organization.

The building was designed by the architectural firm of Coffman, Salsbury & Stafford in the Romanesque Revival style. An architect's drawing of the building includes five people in front of the building, all women. The women in the sketch were dressed in contemporary 1920s fashions, with bobbed hair and knee-length skirts, and one behind the wheel of an automobile. This sketch provides insight into the changing role of women in the 1920s, and reflects the intended purpose of the building as the home of a women's organization. The building was completed in 1928, and used for both public and private functions. Many local schools used the hall's grand ballroom for dances and social functions. A fire in December 1936 temporarily closed the hall, but it was quickly repaired and reopened. Located directly across from the reconstructed Sutter's Fort, the hall became one of many social institutions around the Fort's perimeter on the eastern end of K Street.

In 2023, the building was converted to a Hyatt hotel, adding an 8-story steel-framed structure to the rear of the historic building.
