= George & Mabel Barr House =

Historic house in California, United States

- U.S. National Register of Historic Places
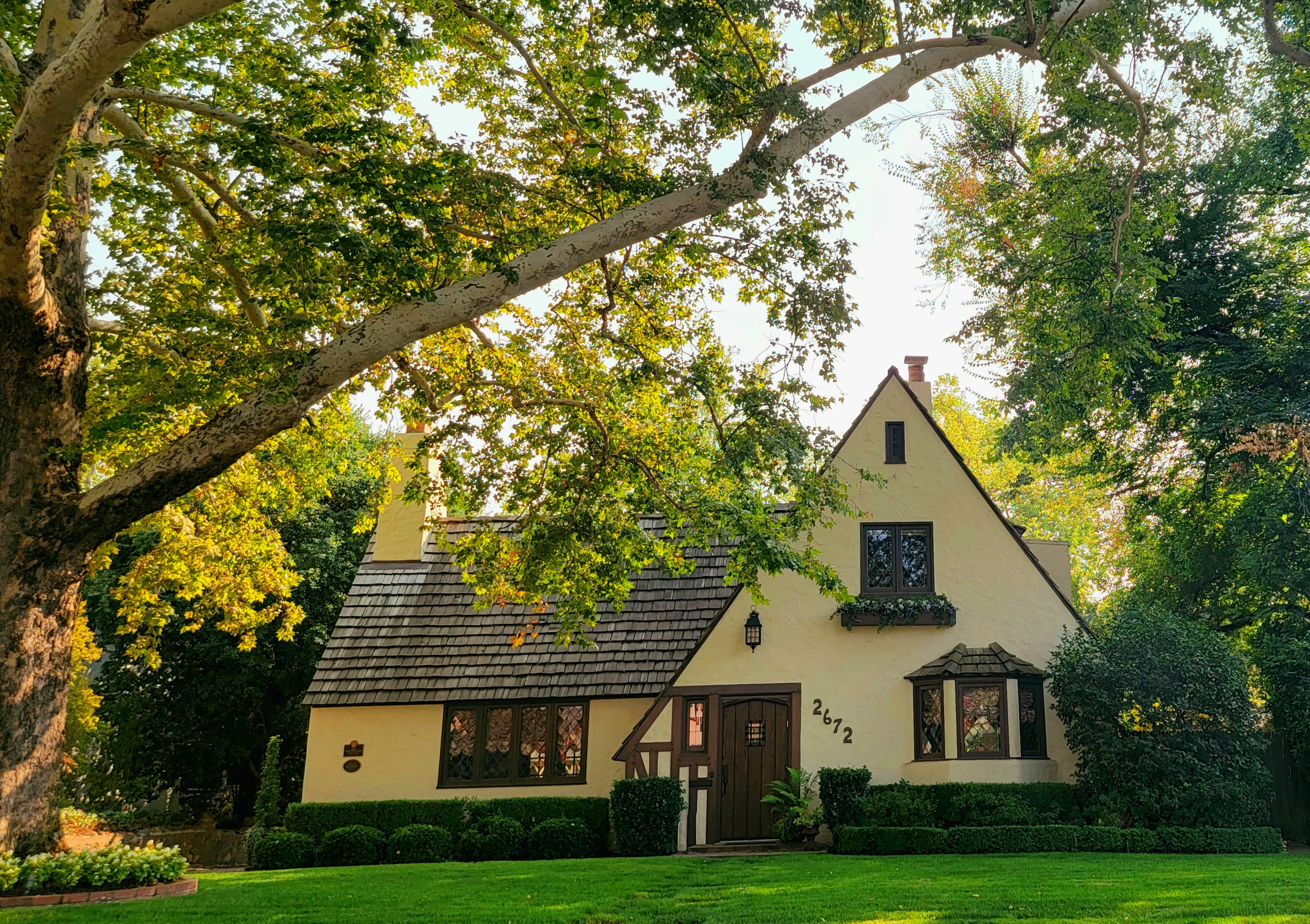

- Location within Sacramento, California Location within California Location within the United States
- Location: 2672 Montgomery Way, Sacramento, California
- Coordinates: 38°32′47.4″N 121°28′40″W
- Area: 0.28 acres (0.11 ha)
- Built: 1923
- Architect: Dean & Dean
- Architectural style: Tudor Revival
- NRHP reference No.: 100004528
- Added to NRHP: October 21, 2019

The George & Mabel Barr House located in Sacramento, California is a house, designed in the Tudor Revival architecture style by local architectural firm Dean & Dean. It was developed as part of the South Curtis Oaks housing tract by builder J.C. Carly, associated with the Better Homes in America movement.
