= Maydestone Apartments =

Historic house in California, United States

- U.S. National Register of Historic Places
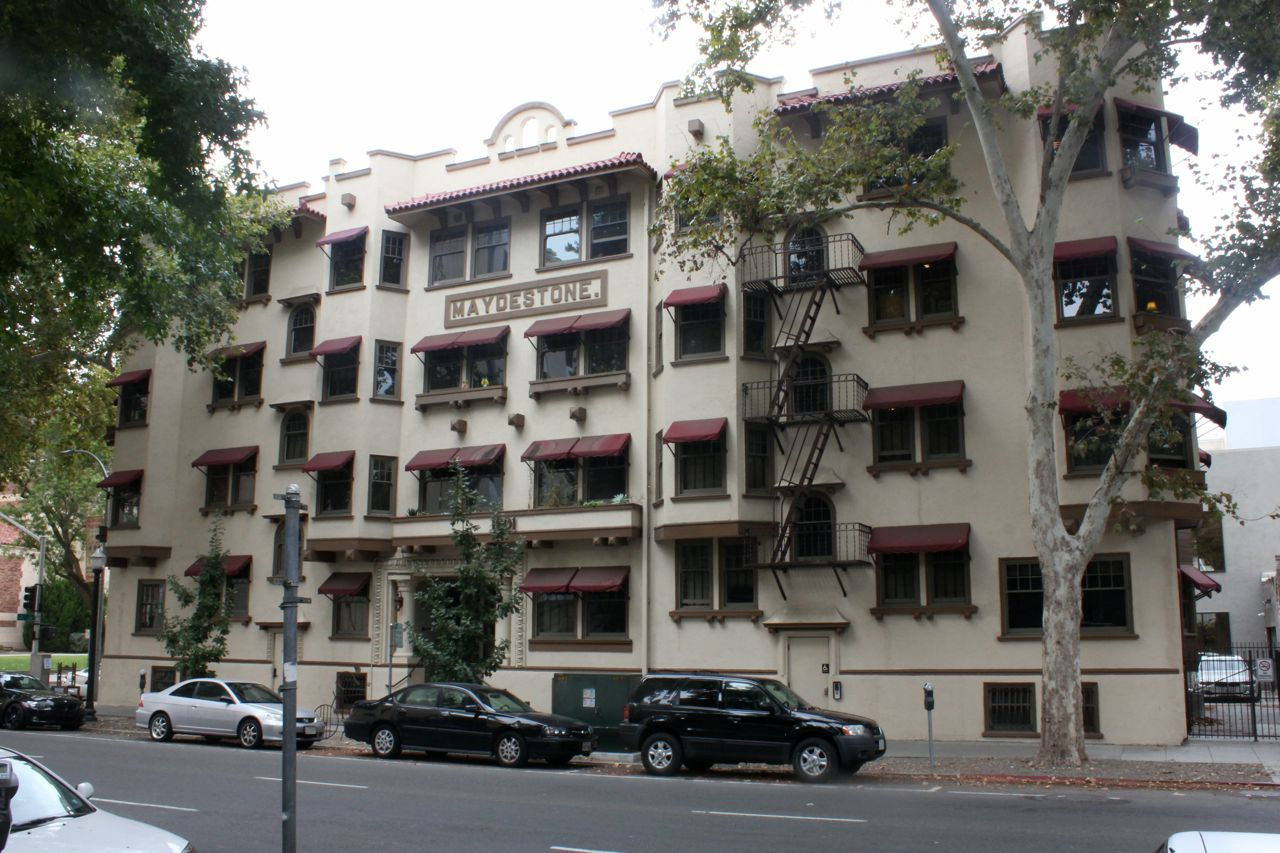

- Location within Sacramento, California Location within California Location within the United States
- Location: 1001 15th St., Sacramento, California
- Coordinates: 38°34′42″N 121°29′11″W
- Area: .11 acres (0.045 ha)
- Built: 1910
- Architectural style: Mission Revival
- NRHP reference No.: 12000812
- Added to NRHP: September 25, 2012

The Maydestone Apartments located in Sacramento, California is a historic four-story, 32-unit apartment building designed in the Mission Revival architectural style and built in 1910. It underwent repair from 2010 to 2011 which restored the building. It currently operates as affordable apartments, offering studio and one-bedroom units. It is located across the street from the Sacramento Memorial Auditorium. A unique feature of the apartments is the pull-out beds tucked beneath raised bathroom floors or kitchen counters.

== History ==
The building was built by George W. Murray, a local brick contractor. During the early 20th century expansion of Sacramento, it served a population of white and blue-collar employees that worked within the downtown area. It is the largest wood-framed apartment building remaining from the early 20th century. The Maydestone Apartments are a great example of larger apartment complexes built during the early 20th century while Sacramento was experiencing a large population growth and urbanization. It is also a great example of the Mission Revival architecture style, of which Sacramento has few examples of.

== See also ==
- Sacramento, California
