= Anne Hathaway Cottage =

Historic house in California, United States

- U.S. National Register of Historic Places
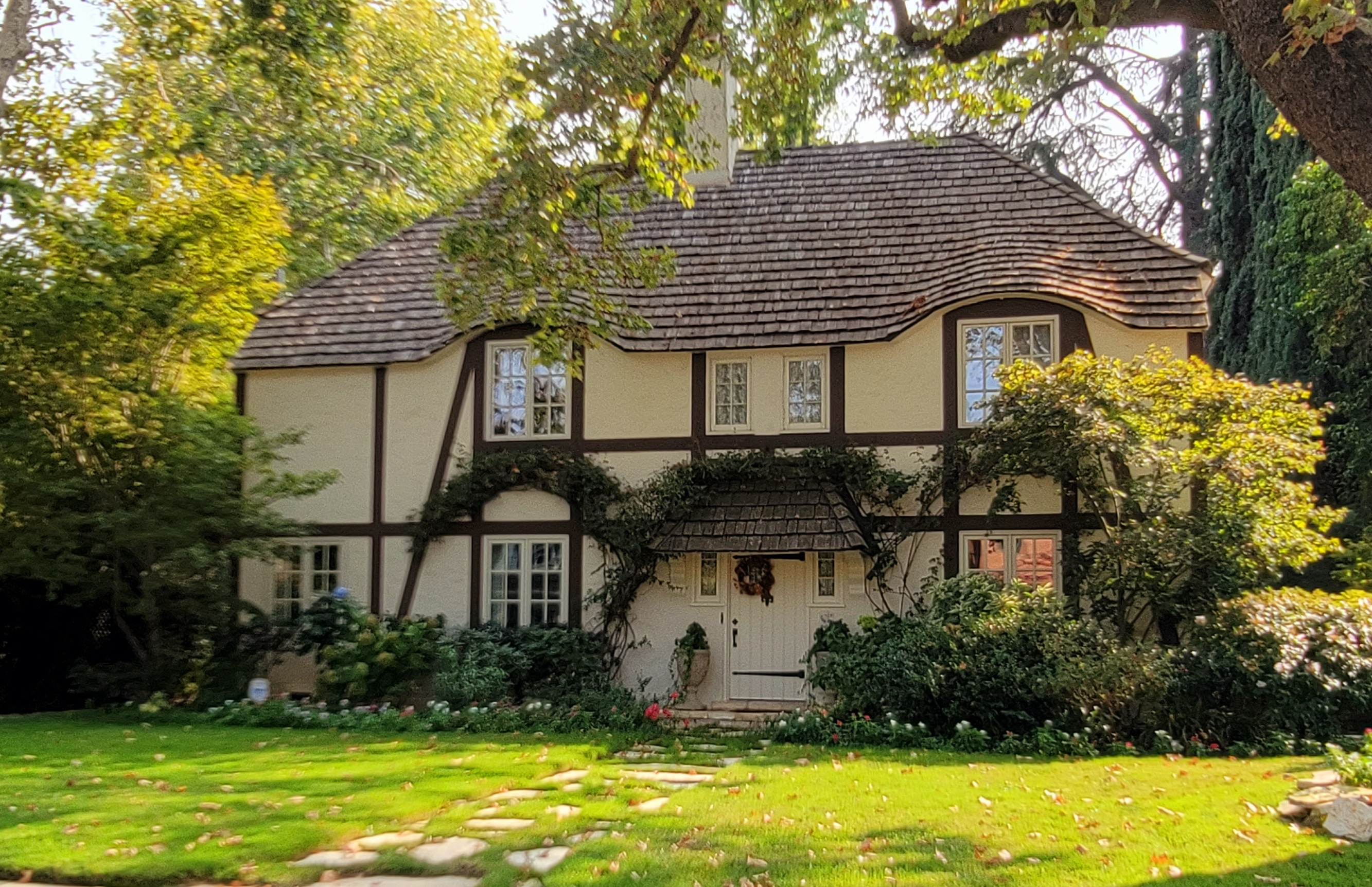

- Location within Sacramento, California Location within California Location within the United States
- Location: 2640 Montgomery Way, Sacramento, California
- Coordinates: 38°32′48″N 121°28′43.1″W
- Built: 1923
- Architect: Dean & Dean
- Architectural style: Tudor Revival
- NRHP reference No.: 100004529
- Added to NRHP: October 21, 2019

The Anne Hathaway Cottage located in Sacramento, California, is a historic house, in the Tudor Revival architecture style built in the 1923. It was one of several homes designed by Dean & Dean, a local architectural firm started by brothers James and Charles Dean. Their firm designed several stately homes in Sacramento prior to the Great Depression

The Anne Hathaway Cottage is part of the South Curtis Oaks housing tract developed by builder J.C. Carly, associated with the Better Homes in America movement. It was built for drugstore manager Ernest Kimberlin and was advertised as the "Anne Hathaway Cottage" due to its intended similarity to the home of William Shakespeare's wife, located in Warwickshire, England.

The Anne Hathaway Cottage was listed on the National Register of Historic Places in 2019.
