= Sego Milk Plant =

- Utah Condensed Milk Company Plant
- Formerly listed on the U.S. National Register of Historic Places
- Location: 621 3rd St., Galt, California
- Area: 6 acres (2.4 ha)
- Built: 1917
- NRHP reference No.: 78000741

Significant dates
- Added to NRHP: August 3, 1978
- Removed from NRHP: August 30, 2005

The Sego Milk Plant, also known as the Utah Condensed Milk Company Plant, was a historic factory located in Galt, Sacramento County, CA.

Opening in 1916, the plant at one point was connected to over 100 local dairies and processed 200,000 pounds (91,000 kg) of milk per day. It was then shipped out in the form of condensed, evaporated, and powered milk as well as powdered ice cream. The Utah company that owned the 45,000 square feet (4,200 m^{2}) building went out of business in 1961, and the edifice was used by two separate ceramic businesses, but was unoccupied after the city demanded assorted repairs and the owner declared bankruptcy.

The building had as many as 3 stories in certain parts and the property featured a 25,000 US gallons (95,000 L; 21,000 imp gal) water tower that was used to provide water to the town in the event of an emergency.

Home to vandalism and nearly declared a "public nuisance," the building sustained a mysterious fire in 1993 and the city demolished half of the building citing safety concerns. The city also threatened to sue the building's then-owner in an attempt to force her to tear down the building and clear the rubble. At the time of the fire, the building was assessed to be worth a mere $25,000 while the property was worth $175,000.

Today the only thing that remains at the site is a water tower.
