= Merchants National Bank of Sacramento =

Historic building in California, United States

- U.S. National Register of Historic Places
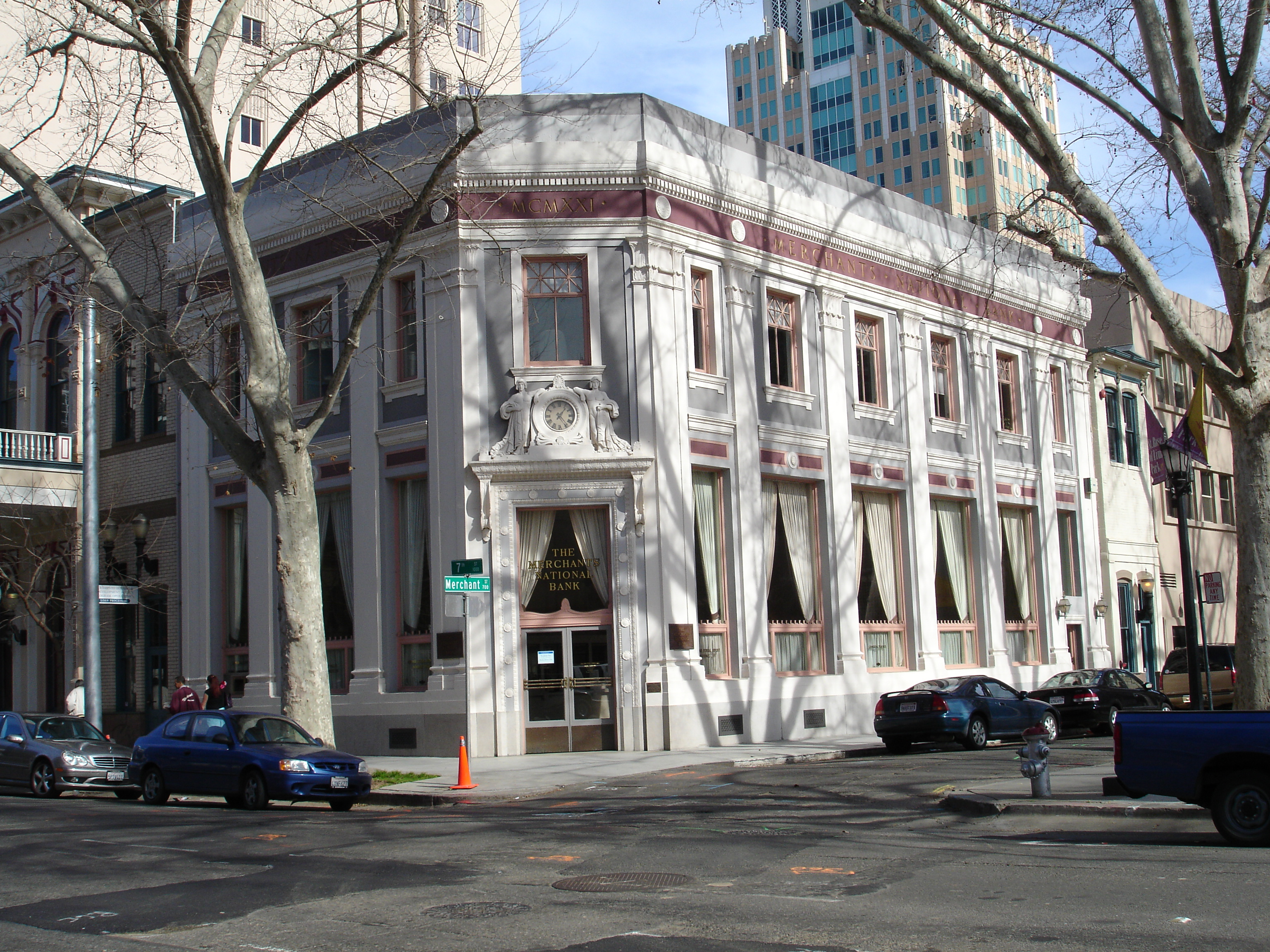

- Location within Sacramento, California Location within California Location within the United States
- Location: 1015 7th St. Sacramento, California
- Coordinates: 38°34′51″N 121°29′50.7″W
- Area: less than 1 acre
- Built: 1921
- Architect: H. H. Winner Co. Barton & Dudley
- Architectural style: Classical Revival
- NRHP reference No.: 96000108
- Added to NRHP: February 16, 1996

Merchants National Bank of Sacramento is a historic building located in Sacramento, California constructed in 1921 in the later Classical Revival style. The bank was purchased in 2018 for $37 million by Bank of Commerce Holdings. At the time, it was the oldest independent bank in Sacramento. The building is designed in a more transitional style from earlier Classical Revival architecture, it evolves towards modernism, where the classical detailing is abstracted and made minimal.

== See also ==
- Sacramento, California
