= Mary Haley Galarneaux House =

Historic house in California, United States

- U.S. National Register of Historic Places
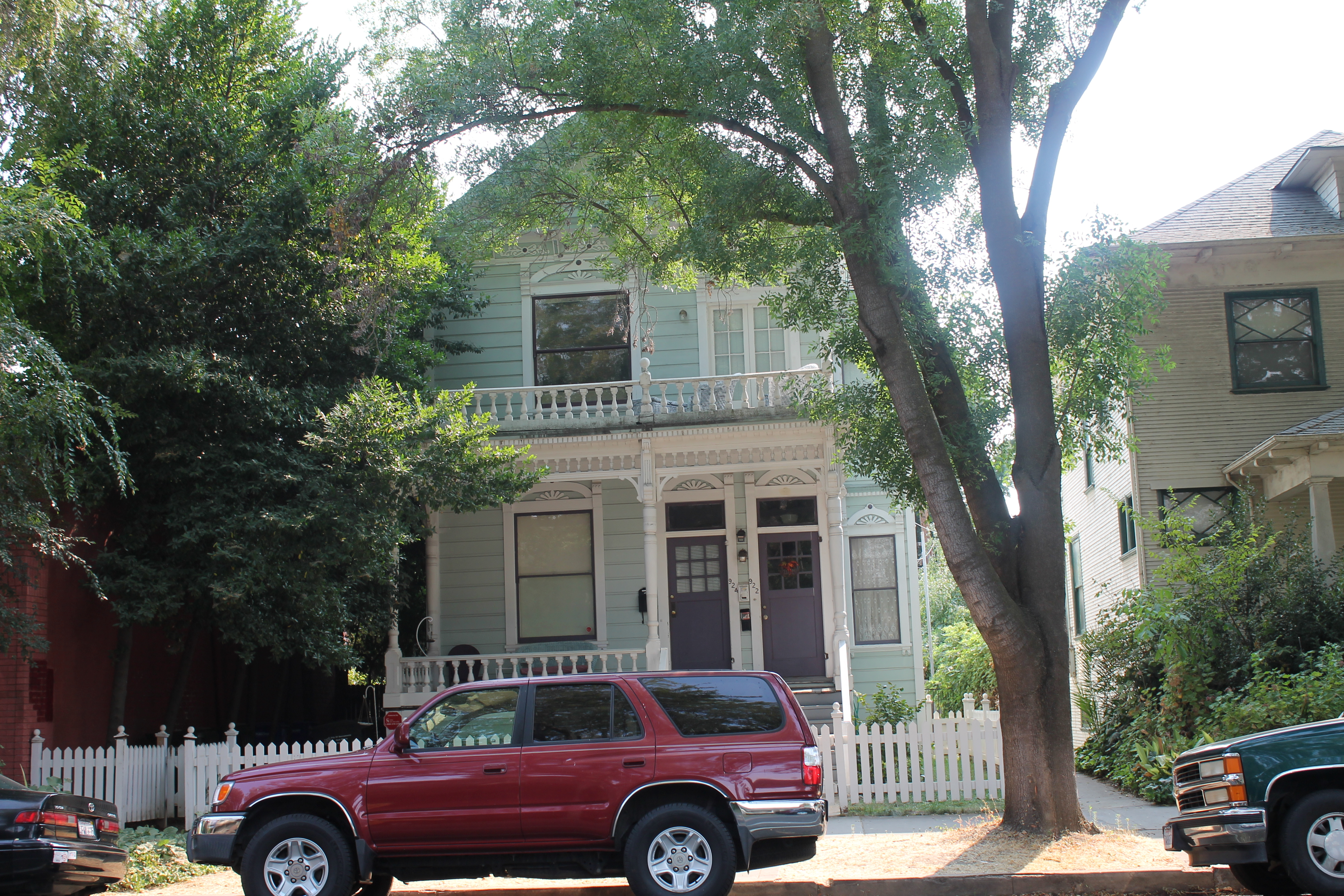

- Location within Sacramento, California Location within California Location within the United States
- Location: 922-924 T Street., Sacramento, California
- Coordinates: 38°34′09.2″N 121°29′55.7″W
- Area: less than one acre
- Built: c. 1890
- Architectural style: Italianate Victorian style
- NRHP reference No.: 01000077
- Added to NRHP: February 12, 2001

The Mary Haley Galarneaux House located in Sacramento, California is an Italianate Victorian architecture style house. In 1915, the house was moved from its original location to a different neighborhood with other older residential buildings.
