= Alkali Flat Historic District =

Historic district in Sacramento, California

- U.S. National Register of Historic Places
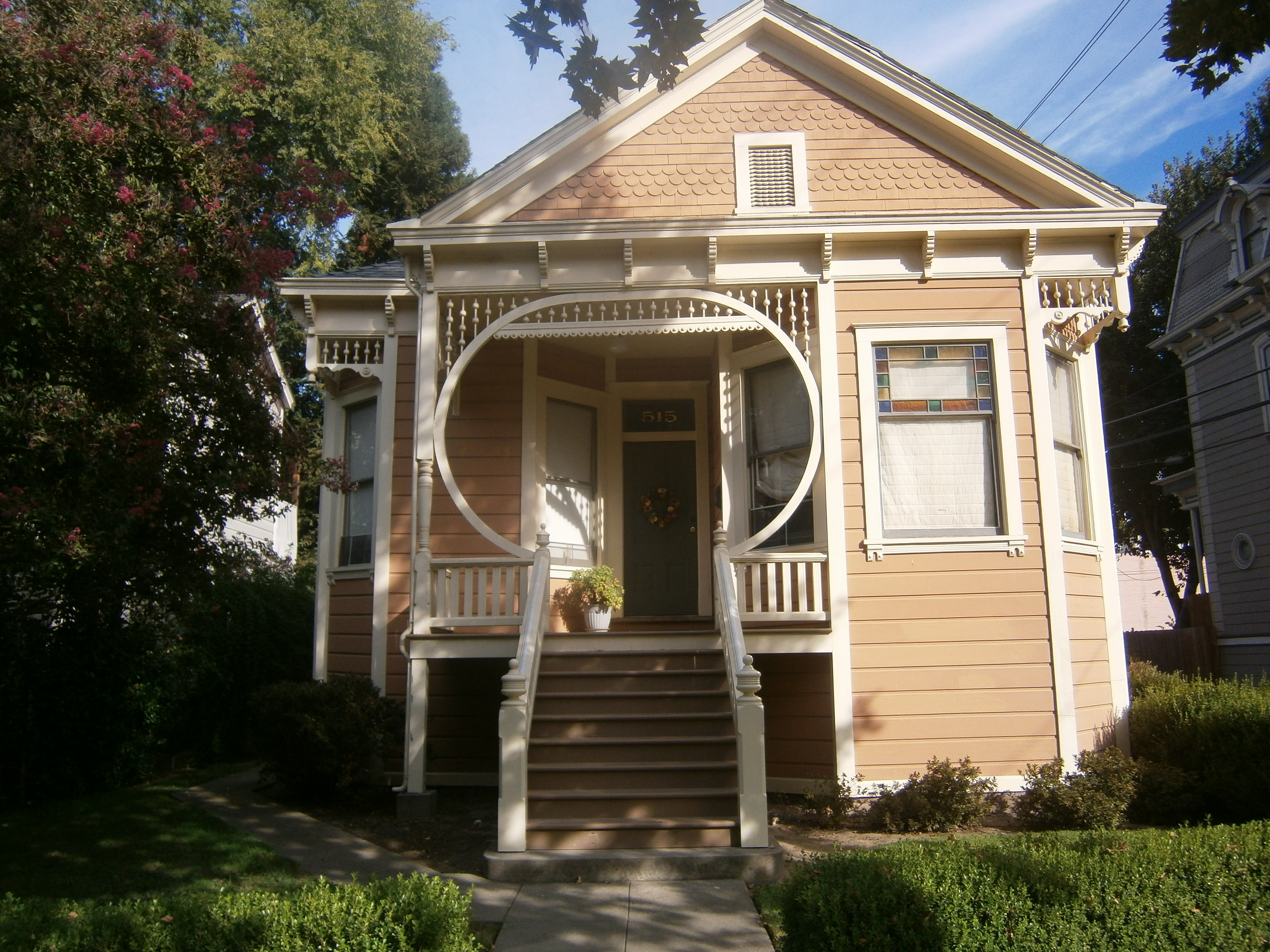
- A house in the West district
- Location: Sacramento, California
- NRHP reference No.: 84000929; 84000933; 84000936
- Added to NRHP: Central and West districts: 26 July 1984; North district: 19 April 1984

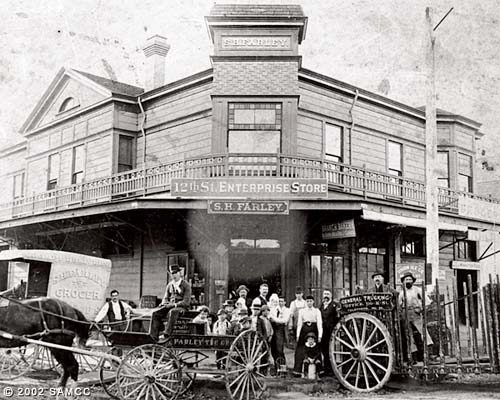
Alkali Flat Sacramento, California in 1884, 12th Street Enterprise Store S. H. Farley.

The Alkali Flat Historic District is a historic district in Sacramento, California. It is the oldest surviving neighborhood in Sacramento. The older Alkali Flat buildings and homes were built between 1853 and 1869 by the Sacramento's upper class. Alkali Flat borders are: 12th Street, H Street (Government Alley), 7th Street, and Southern Pacific Train tracks to the north.

== History ==
As the older upper class houses became less wanted, Irish and Mexicans immigrants moved in the 1920’s. In 1920s, the neighborhood got its name "Alkali Flat" as white powder once coated the ground seasonally in the Sutter slough during spring and winter floods. All of the homes were run down by the 1950s. The city started a redevelopment program for Alkali Flat. The city zoned Alkali Flat as a C-4 zone for business. KCRA Television moved in, along with other businesses. The County of Sacramento built offices and parking in Alkali Flat. The Capitol Corridor project and I-5 established in 1991, removed houses in Sacramento and some moved into Alkali Flat. The art group Royal Chicano Air Force (RCAF) opened in 1960s in Alkali Flat. It was one of the "most important collective artist groups" A new city redevelopment program for Alkali Flat started on February 10, 1972. The “Redevelopment Plan Alkali Flat Project No 6” zoned some of Alkali Flat as residential, starting an effort to preserve the history of Alkali Flat. Some historic homes were moved to Alkali Flat in the 1990s.

The Blue Line (SacRT) has a station, as well as the Alkali Flat/La Valentina station and the Globe station that opened in 1987.

== National Register of Historic Places ==
In 1984 Alkali Flat received three National Register of Historic Places listings:

- Alkali Flat Central Historic District: 95-acre E and F Streets, between 9th and 12th Sts, (#84000929 on July 26, 1984) 38.584444°N 121.489722°W.
- Alkali Flat North Historic District: 23-acre D and 11th Streets (#84000933 on April 19, 1984). 38.58666°N 121.487778°W
- Alkali Flat West Historic District: 67-acre E, F, and 8th Streets, mostly residential with some canals. (#84000933 on July 26, 1984) 38.585833°N 121.493056°W

== Notable places ==
Some of the notable places in Alkali Flat Historic District:
There are 46 buildings on Central Alkali Flat National list: Alkali Flat West has 17 buildings on the National list. Alkali Flat North has 14 buildings on the National list.

- J. Neely Johnson House Fourth Governor of California home. National Register #76000512
- Mesick House National Register #82002236.
- Kuchler Row National Register #82002234.
- Hubbard-Upson House, National Register #77000327
- Anton Wagner Duplex
- Phoenix Milling Company now The Globe Mill
- Van Voorhies House
- Crystal Cream and Butter Company
- Phoenix Flour Mill
- California Almond Growers Exchange (1910-1915)
- Southern Pacific Hospital on 8th & F Street
- Banta Mill (1898-1902)
- Burnett & Sons Novelty Wood Works
- Sacramento Hostel, 1885 Victorian mansion
- Gordon D. Schaber Sacramento County Courthouse
- Sacramento County Public Law Library
- KCRA-TV
- Zapata Park, 1 acre park, with Community Gardens.
- Neely Johnson Park, 1 acre park

== Gallery ==
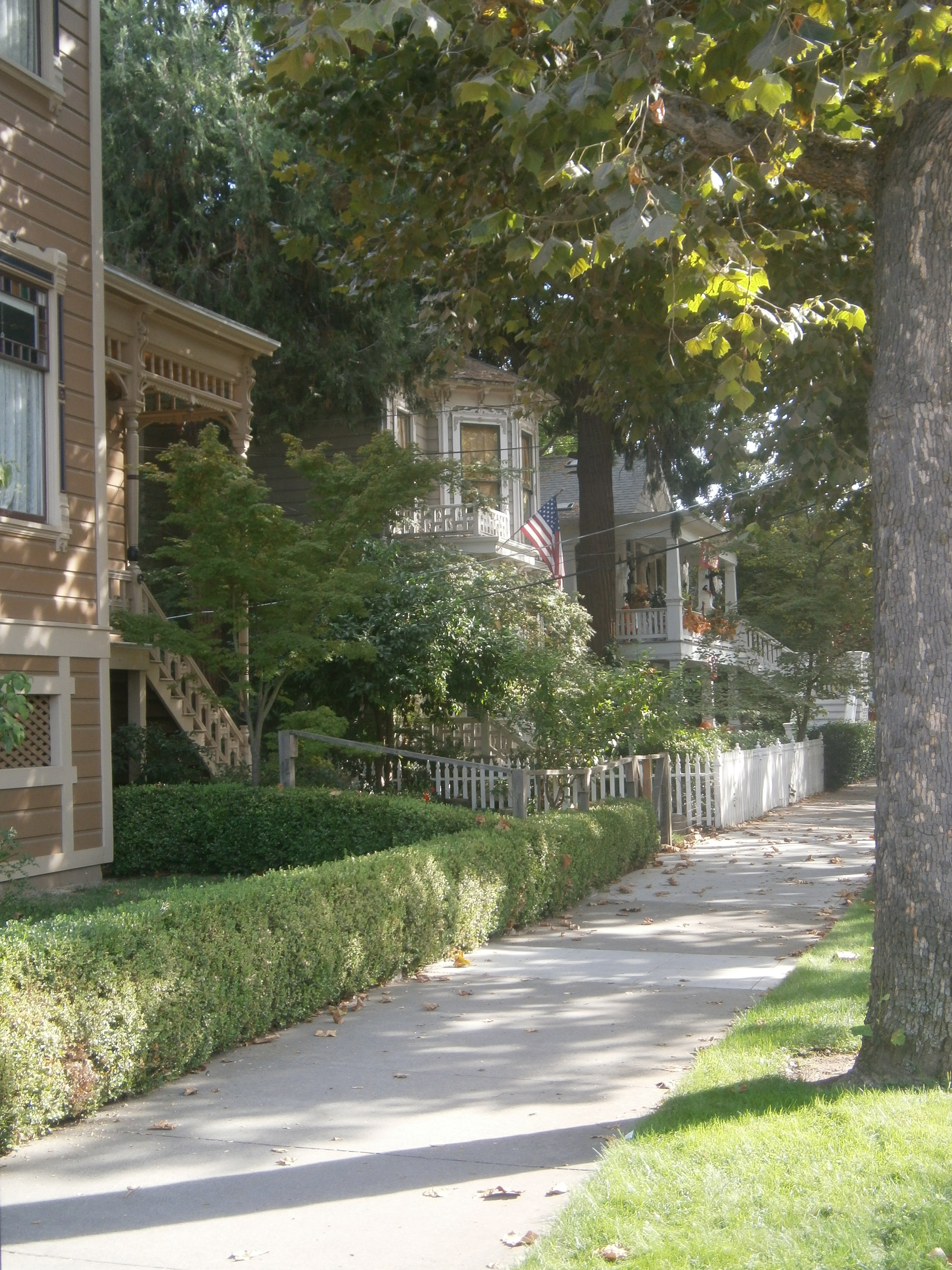
Alkali Flat Central Historic District

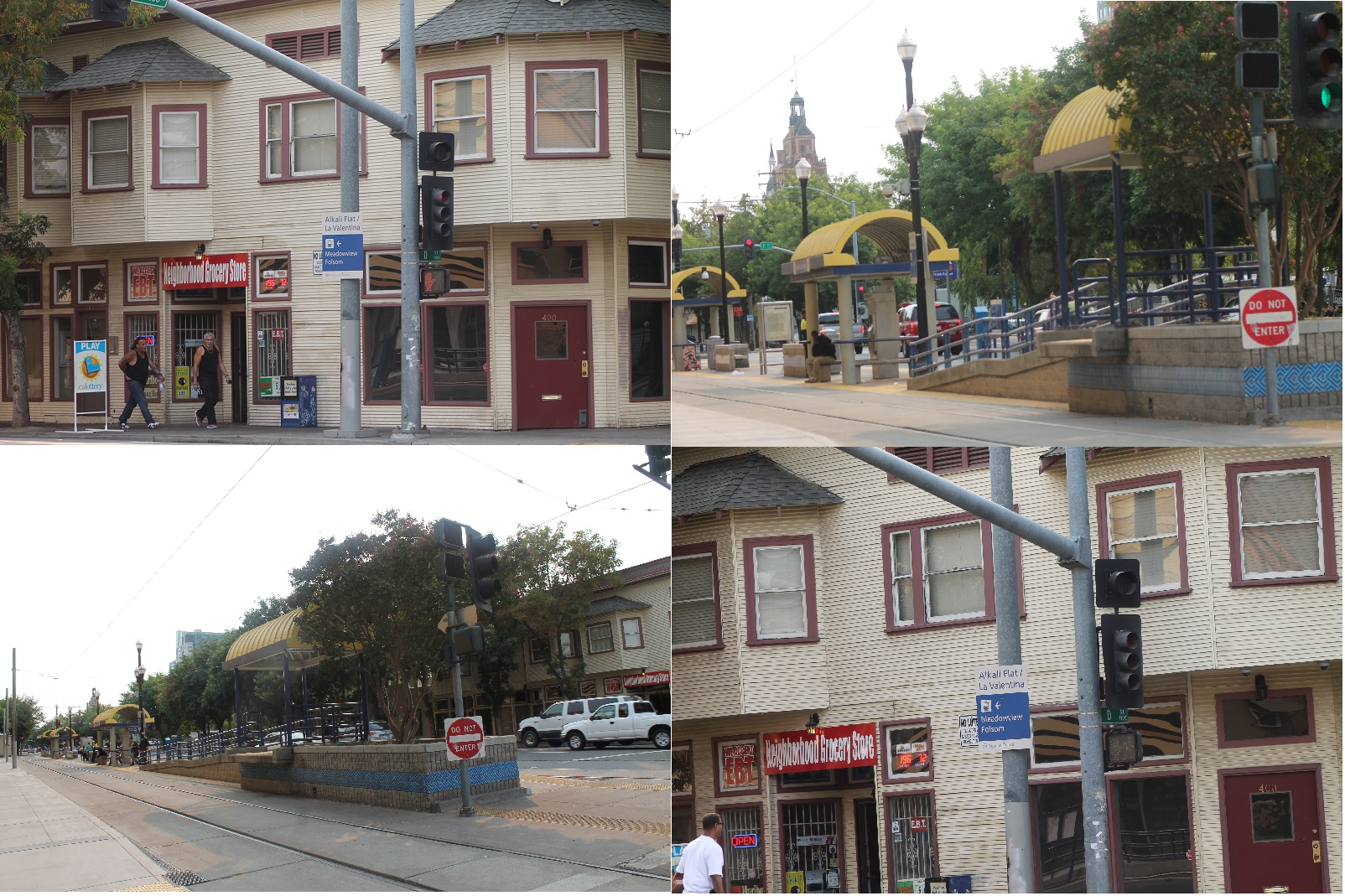
Alkali Flat North Historic District

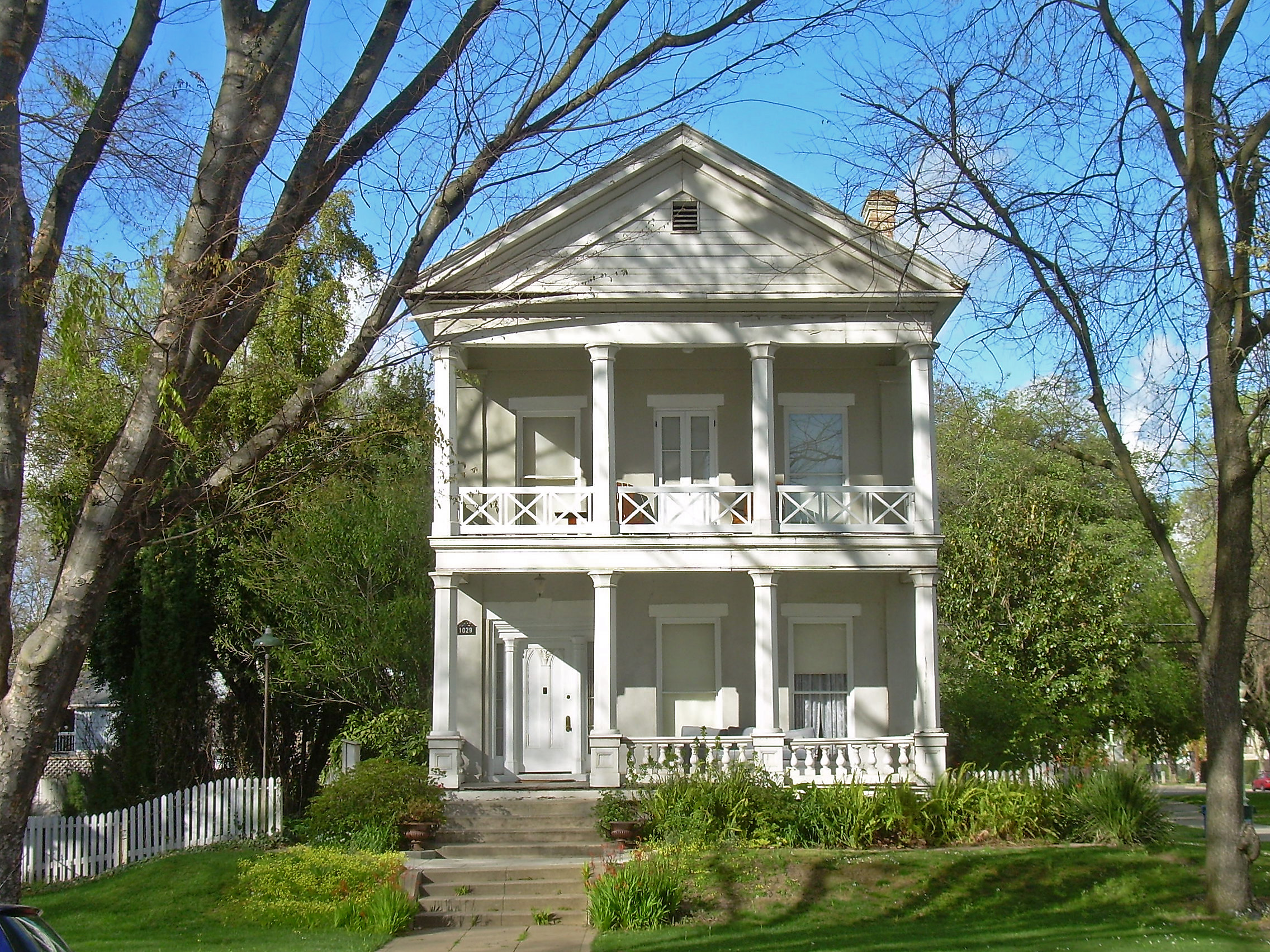
J. Neely Johnson House

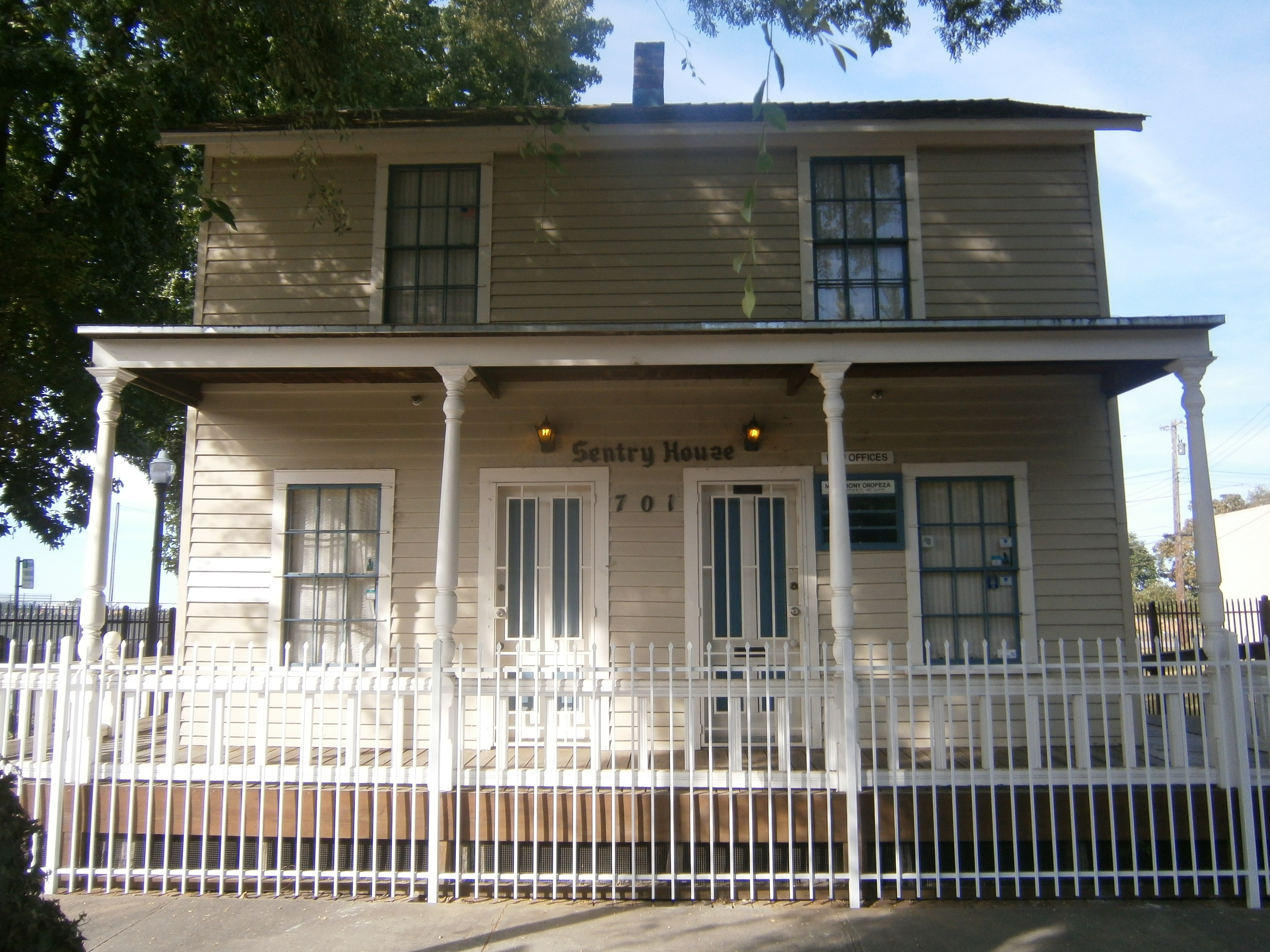
Anton Wagner Duplex

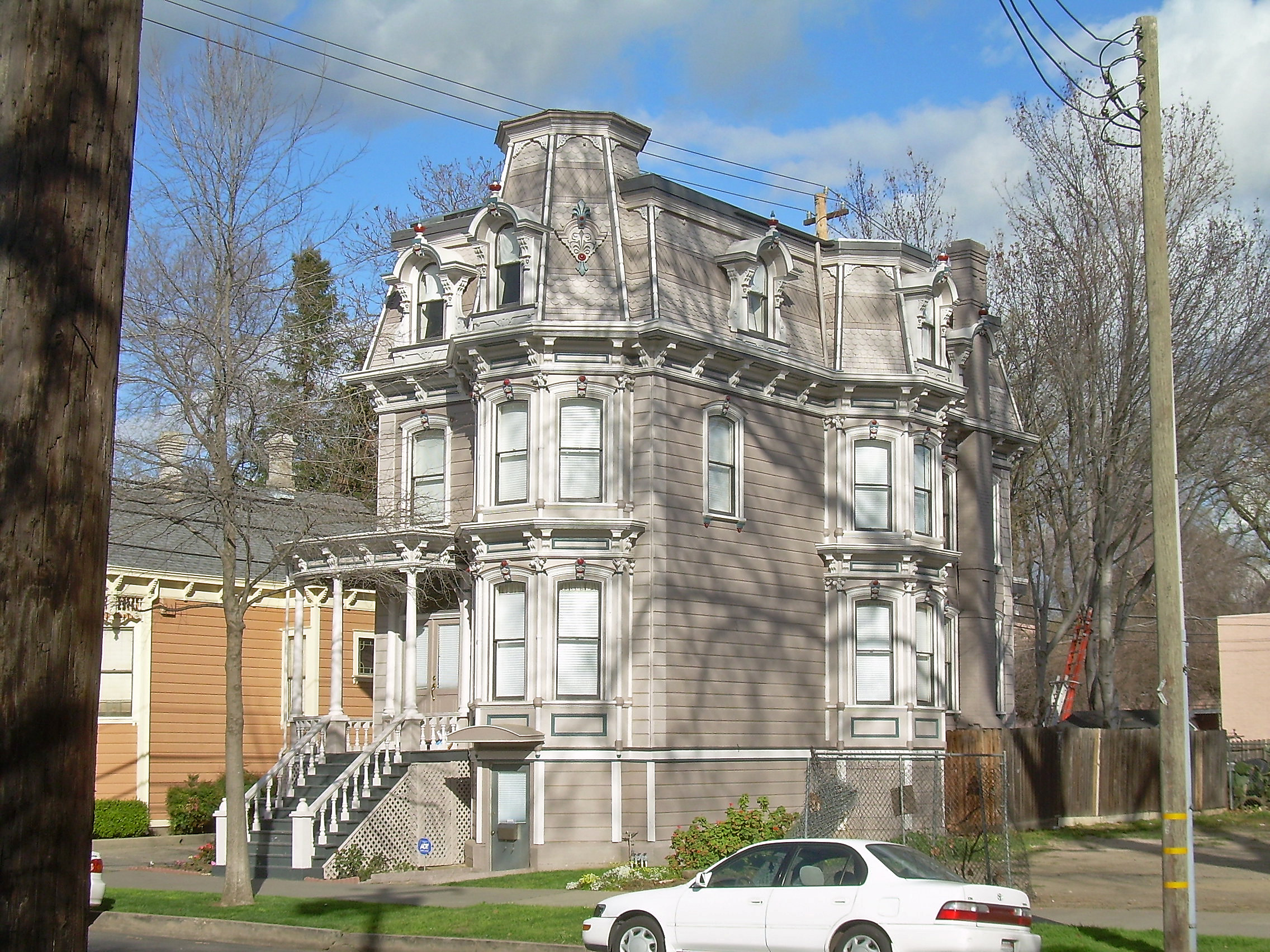
Mesick House

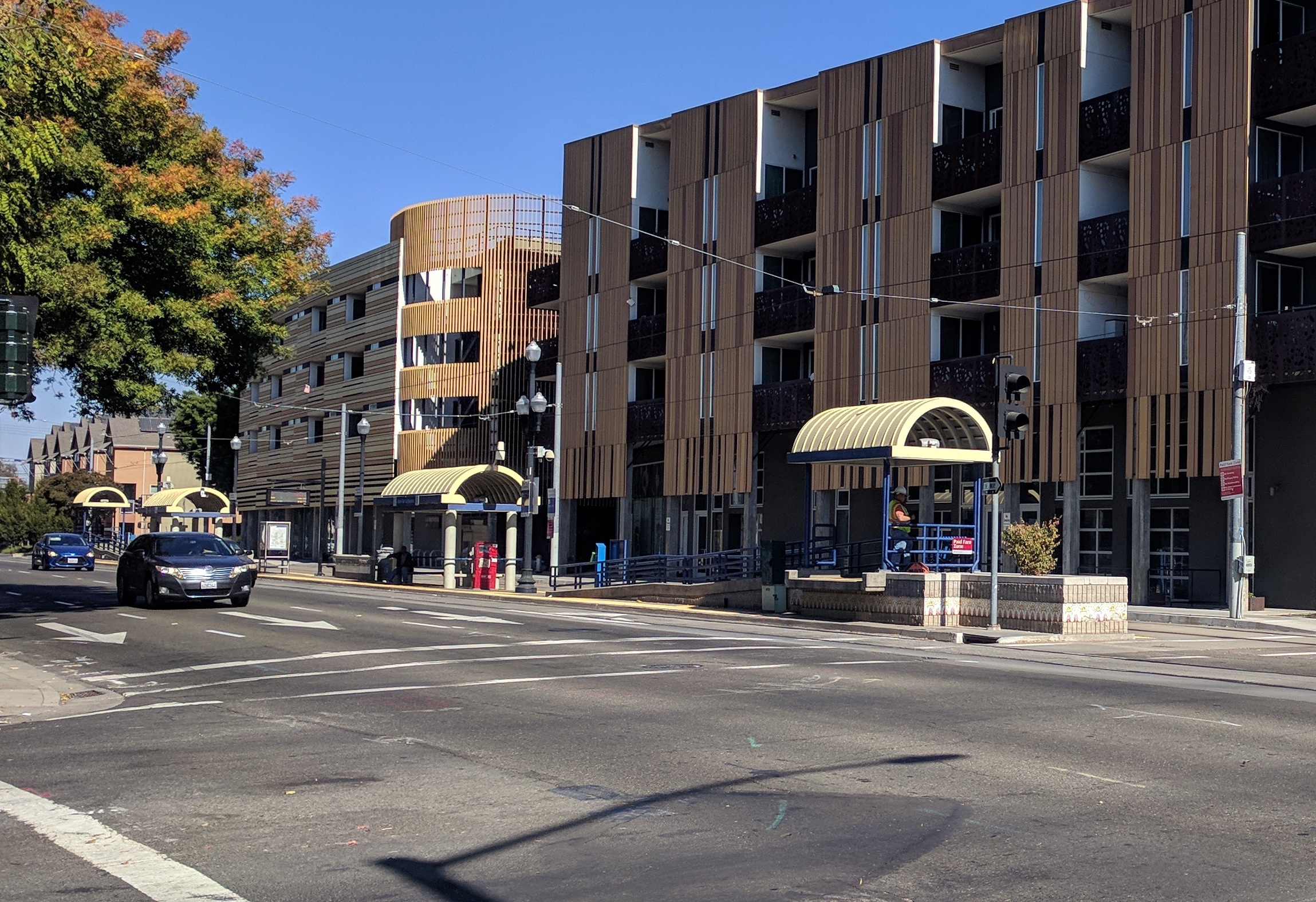
Alkali Flat/La Valentina station in 2018

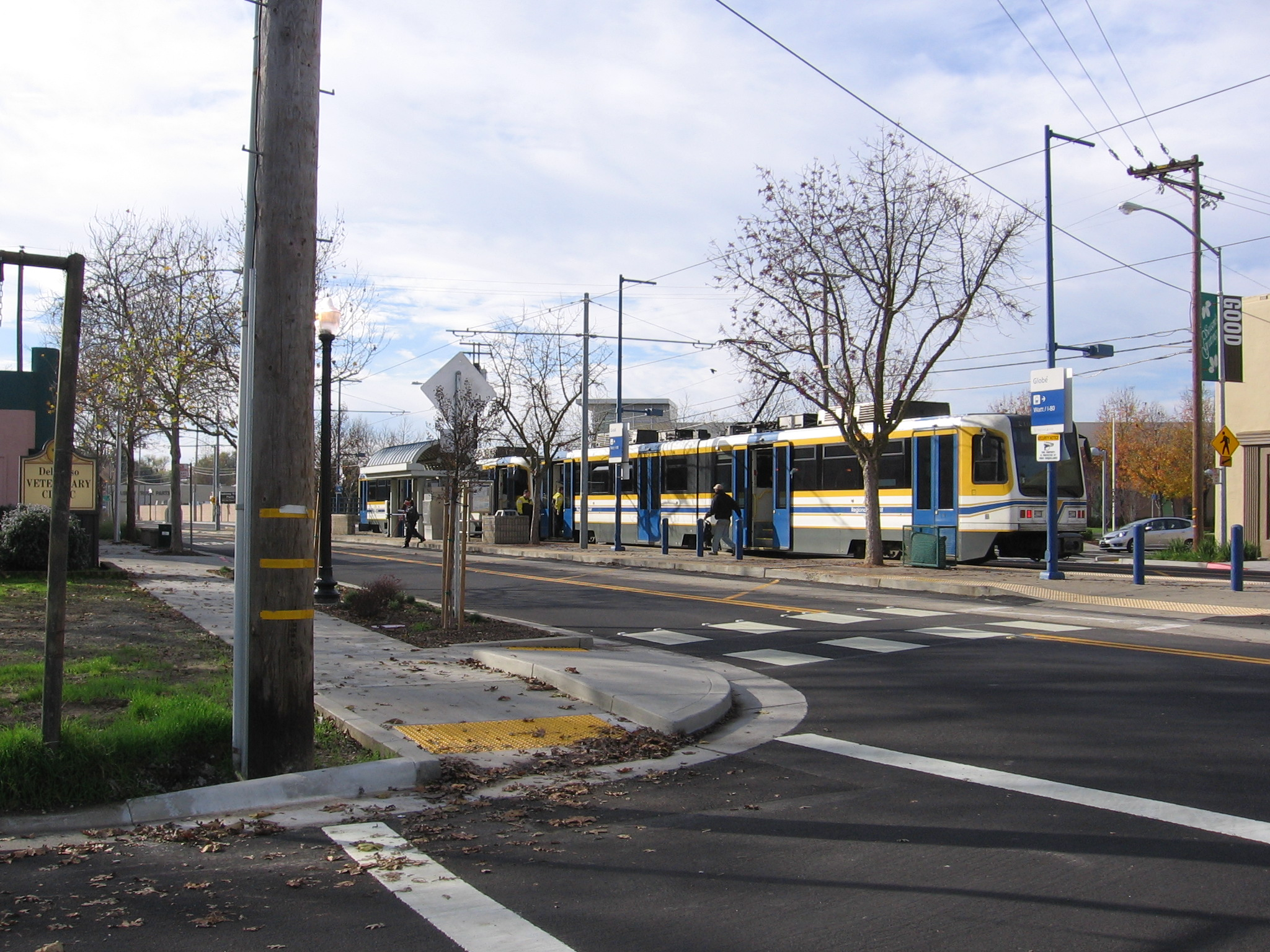
Alkali Flat's Globe station

== See also ==
- National Register of Historic Places listings in Sacramento County, California
- Old Sacramento State Historic Park
- Old Sacramento Chinatown
