= Public law libraries in the United States =

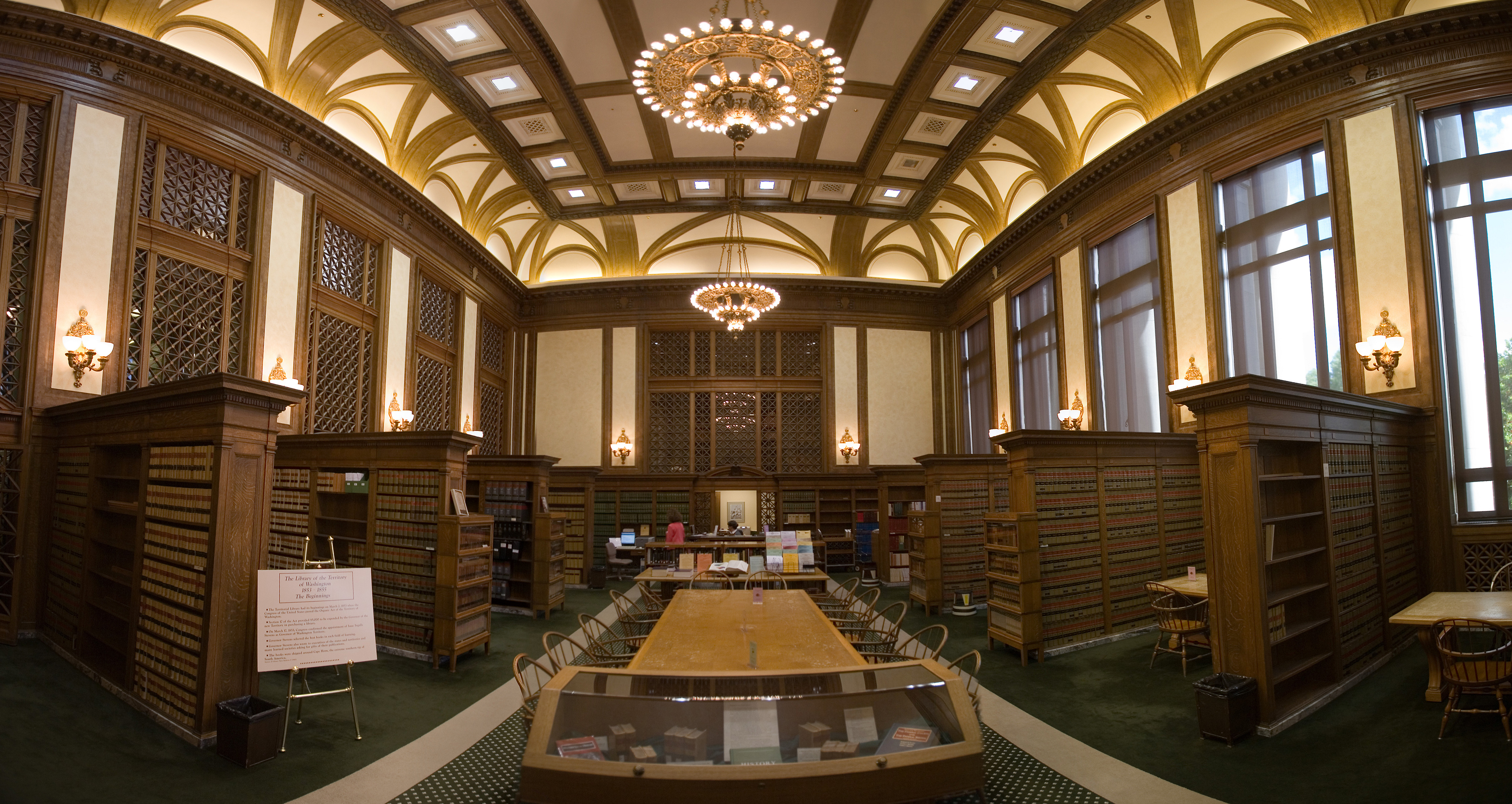
Inside of the Law Library at the Temple of Justice, Washington State Capitol

Public law libraries provide access to primary legal sources (statutes, cases, and regulations) and secondary sources (professional reference books, form books, and self-help books) used in legal matters. In most U.S. states, public law libraries are part of the trial court system, a department of the state or county government, or an independent local government agency managed by a board of trustees. Public law libraries serve several user groups with different information needs: judges and their support staff, attorneys in all types of practice, and the general public.

== History ==
The first “public” law libraries were membership libraries funded by subscribers, who were generally lawyers. The first of these appeared in 1802, when the Law Library Company of the City of Philadelphia (now called Jenkins Law Library) was founded by the lawyers of that city. The Social Law Library in Boston was founded in 1803. Both of these are still operating.

By 1860, most major cities had a similar membership library. In the second half of the 19th century, as the population and the nation grew, the cost of legal books and updates also grew rapidly, and many membership law libraries had financial difficulty. Around this time, some states began providing public funding to support law libraries, most often by allocating a portion of court filing fees, but in some cases by money collected from sources such as the state liquor control act or traffic fines. In at least one state, Pennsylvania, the state legislature establishes county law libraries but provides no funding at all.

Along with public funding came increased access to members of the general public. In 1891 California became the first state to specifically establish a system of public law libraries, funded by court filing fees, and open to the general public as well as lawyers. During the twentieth century, public law libraries became more common throughout the United States and by 2005, all but one state had passed legislation establishing them. Funding continues to vary widely between states, and even between counties.

== Modern public law libraries ==
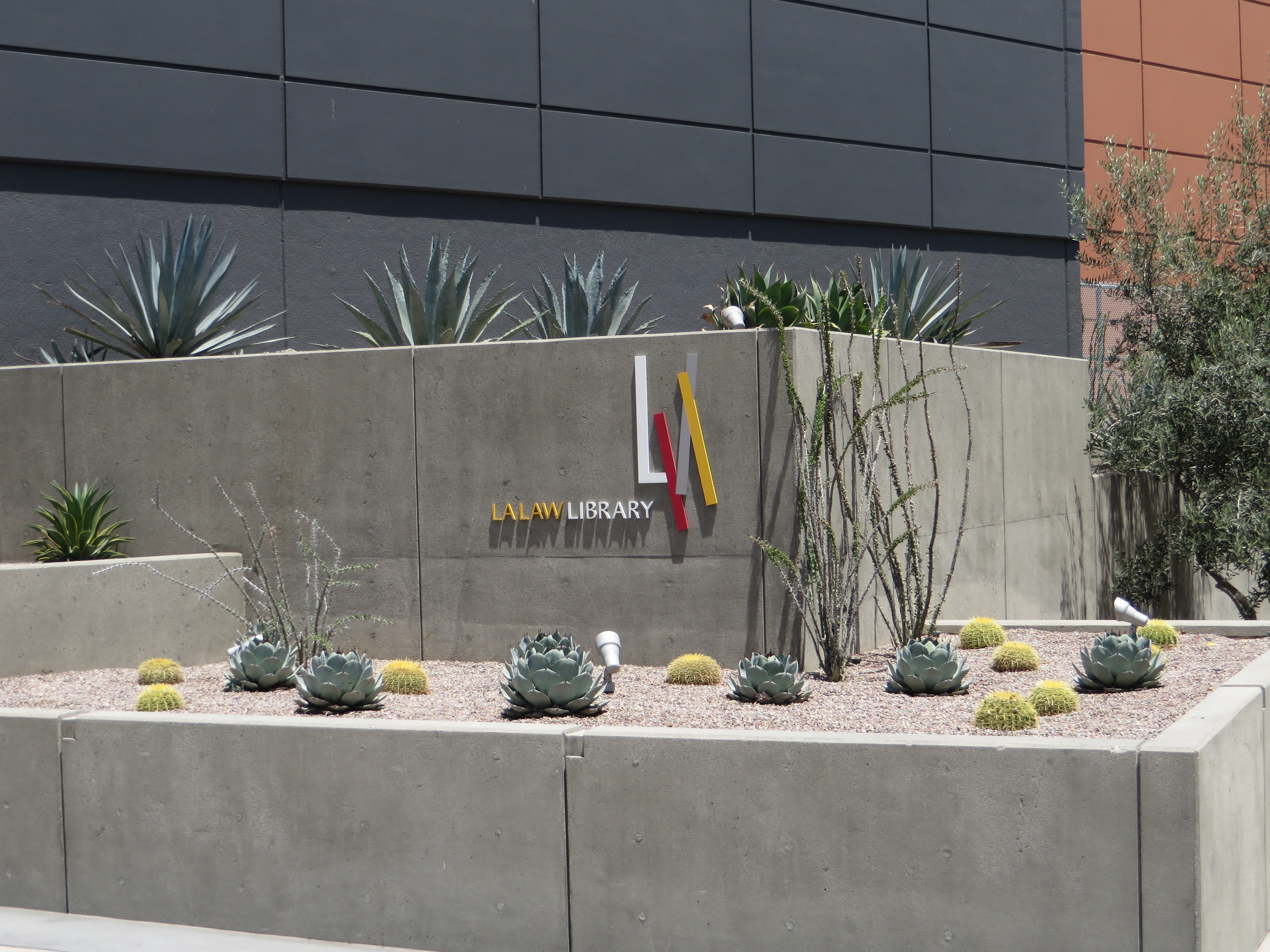
LA Law Library

Today, public law libraries are found in courts, state and federal agencies, and as stand-alone law libraries, usually organized by county. Many public law libraries participate in the American Association of Law Libraries (AALL), and specifically in the Government Law Libraries Special Interest Section (GLL).

== Typical collections and services ==
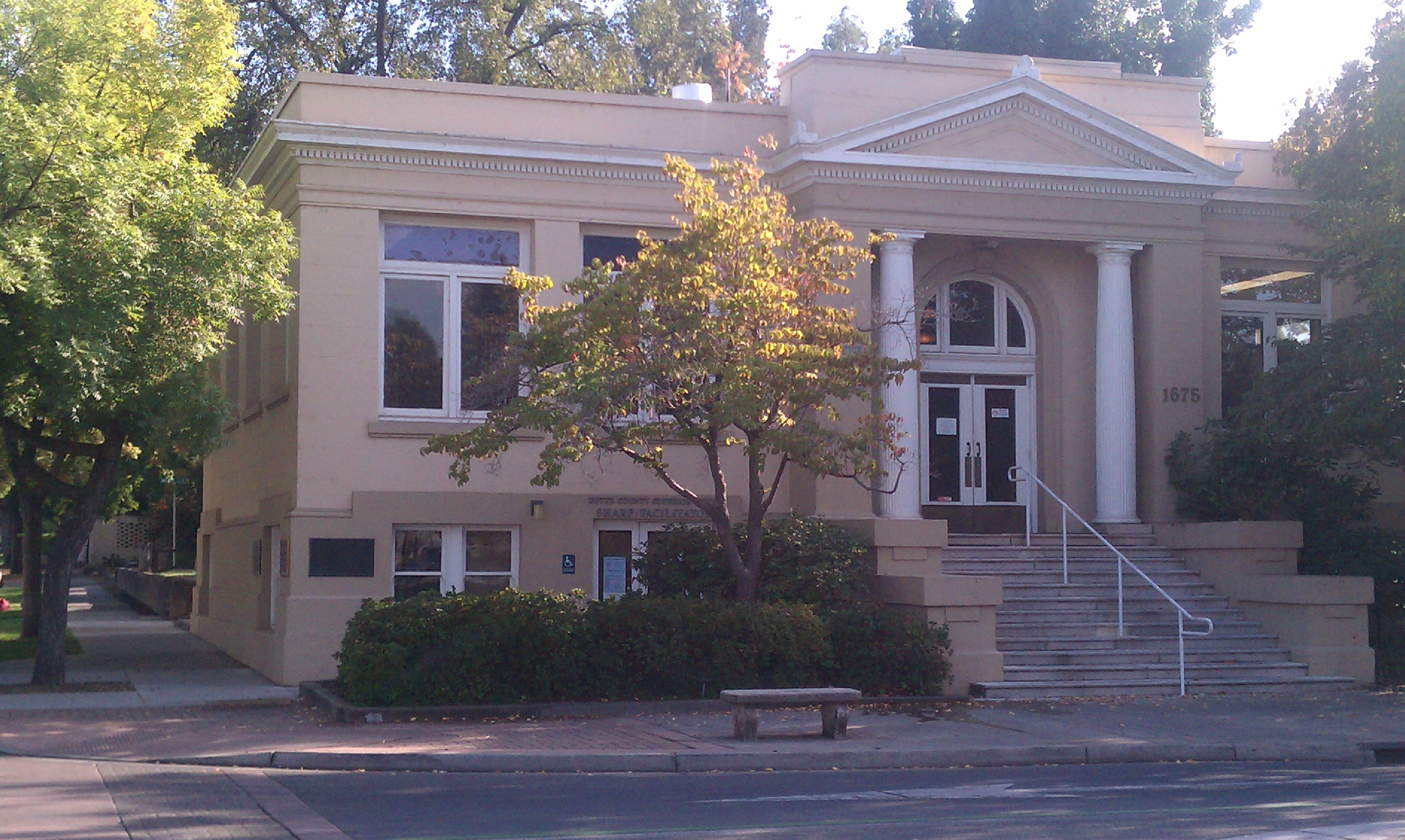
Oroville, California law library 2012

Public law libraries usually focus on information useful to the practicing attorney and self-represented litigants, rather than academic research material. This typically includes primary sources of law as well as practical guides for handling legal matters. In practice, depending on their levels of funding, individual public law libraries may offer some or all of these resources.

Print collection

According to the AALL's "County Public Law Library Standards," the typical public law library should provide access to its home state’s current laws, including the published decisions of the state courts; current annotated state statutes, constitution, and court rules; and the current administrative code and agency decisions. Some provide older versions as well, for historical research. A citation service such as Shepard's Citations or Westlaw's Keycite is typically available for users to evaluate the currency and validity of primary law sources. In addition, the public law library usually carries the state legal encyclopedia, if any; practice material such as form books and legal treatises geared toward that state; and local legal newspapers and periodicals.

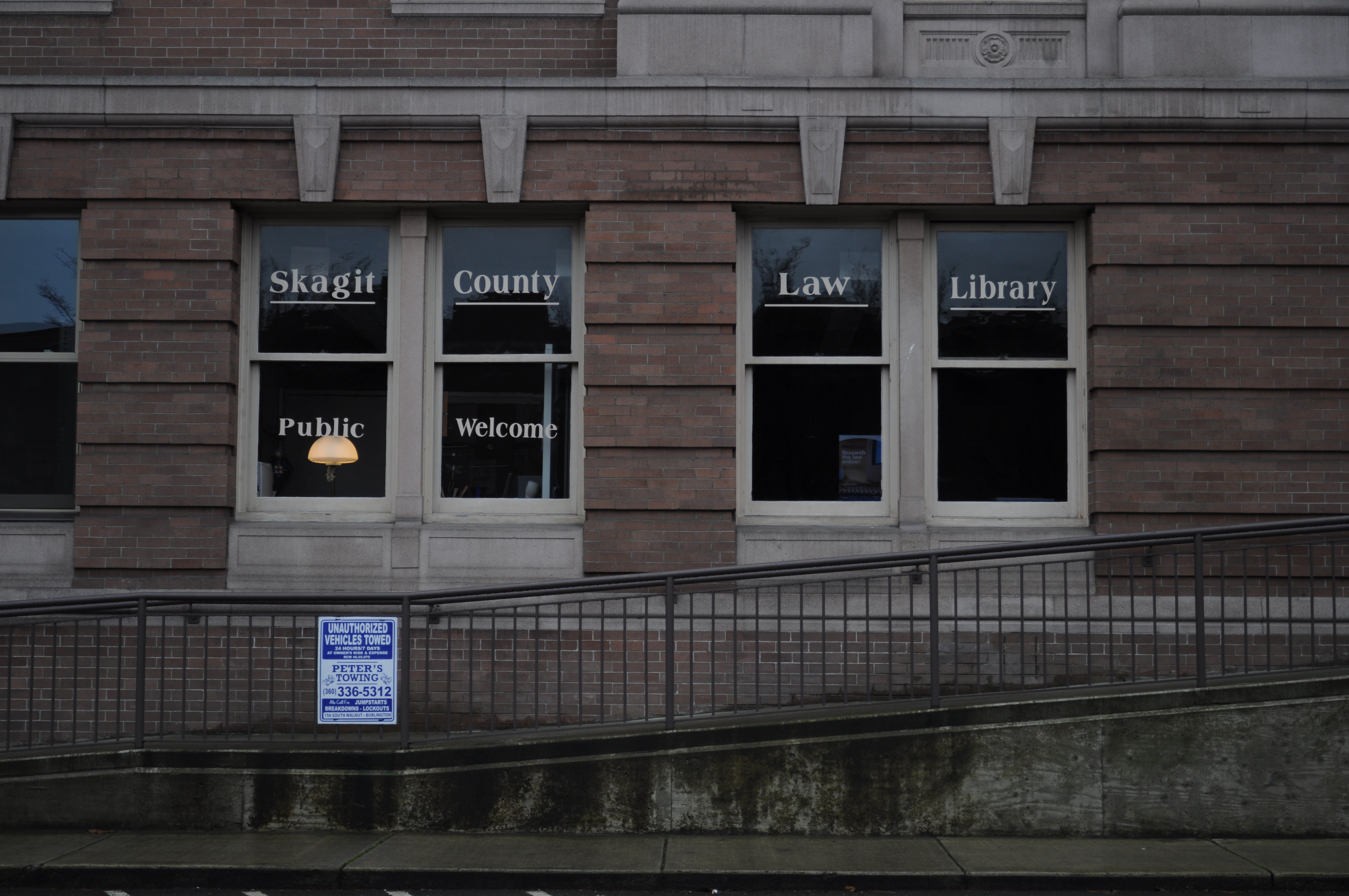
Skagit County Law Library

Public law libraries should generally offer similar coverage for federal material. In addition, ideally they offer a selection of national publications such as American Jurisprudence 2d, Corpus Juris Secundum, and American Law Reports (ALR); at least one general forms set; academic law reviews and a basic collection of legal texts, treatises, practice materials and looseleaf services of contemporary value on subjects of interest to the legal community and the public.

In addition, most public law libraries collect “do-it-yourself” law books that provide information on common legal issues. One well-known publisher in legal self-help is Nolo Press; Atlantic Publishing Company, other resources include the “For Dummies” books and many specialized books such as consumer self-help books, tax preparation material, retirement planning books, and government publications on benefits programs.

Online resources

Public law libraries frequently offer free access to some subscription services as well as access to the internet more generally. While many of the basic primary legal sources are available free online (without annotations or other explanatory material), most of finding aids and secondary sources are available by subscription only, through online law databases such as Westlaw, Lexis, Bloomberg Law, and HeinOnline. Due to their expense, these services are out of reach for some attorneys and most members of the general public.

Original material

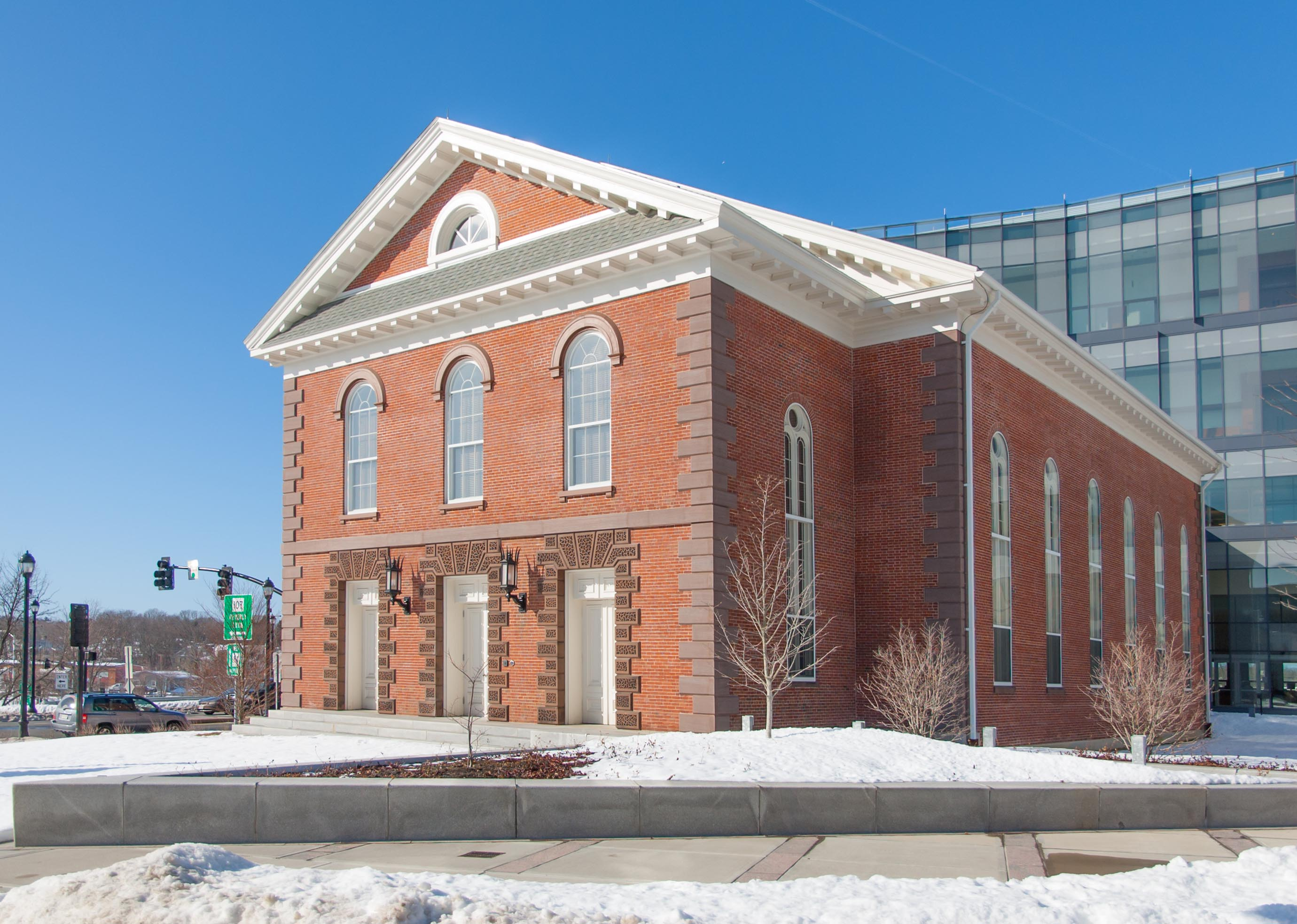
Salem Courts Law Library

Some public law libraries publish self-help guides and materials to assist members of the public in handling simple legal matters as well as guides to help patrons access their materials. Examples of libraries which publish self-help guides include the Baltimore County Law Library, the Minnesota State Law Library, the Sacramento County Public Law Library, the San Diego Law Library, and the Washington State Law Library.

Services

Public law libraries are usually staffed by librarians with a Masters of Library and Information Science (MLIS) degree and experience in legal research; some also have a law degree (JD). Depending on the library, services may include instruction in the use of library resources, research assistance, and classes for attorneys and self-represented litigants; librarians are not permitted to give legal advice.

== Public law libraries and access to self-help ==
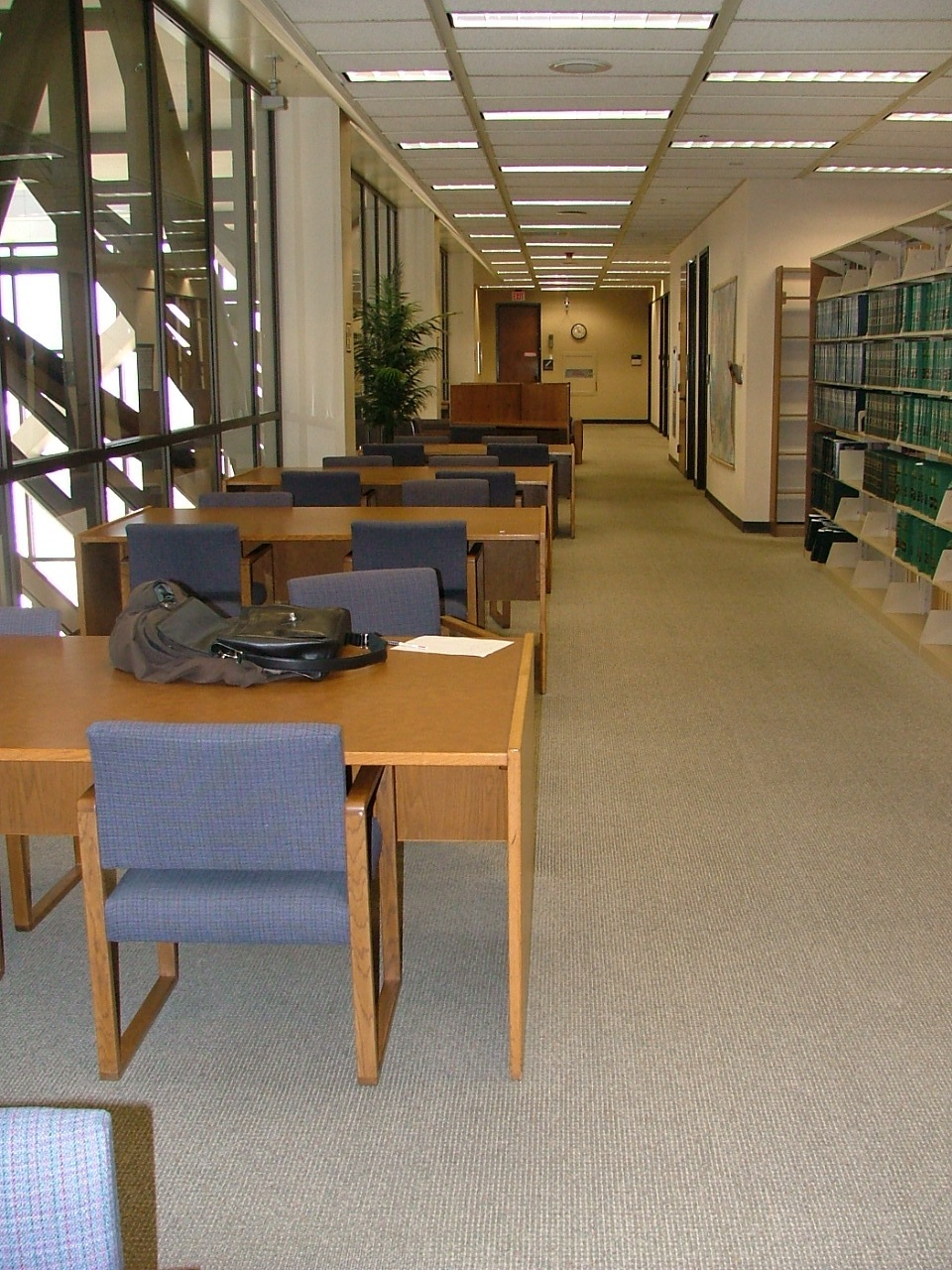
Hennepin County Law Library

Public law libraries, once used primarily by legal professionals, now serve mostly non-attorneys handling their own legal matters. In court, self-represented litigants are a growing percentage of litigants, particularly in family law. Other non-attorney library patrons include entrepreneurs; people documenting personal loans, sales of goods and services, and simple real estate transfers; and people settling the affairs of family members who have died. For many of these patrons, attorneys' services are unaffordable, while others mistrust lawyers or find self-help to be more convenient than finding, evaluating, and hiring an attorney.

Many of these patrons are referred to the law library after seeking pro bono representation, or contacting a legal aid program such as those funded by the Legal Services Corporation. Due to chronic shortages of volunteer attorneys and of funding, only a fraction of the need is met annually. These programs often refer people to a public law library.

Because of the specialized nature of legal information resources, these patrons often need more hands-on assistance than law libraries' traditional patrons. Many law libraries now provide assistance by offering seminars and workshops; collaborating with public libraries; and using the internet and other media to provide instructions and forms. Some libraries either run or host self-help centers with attorneys or paralegals available to assist self-represented litigants.

In a 2013 survey of public and academic law libraries, the Self-Represented Litigation Network found that virtually all of the 153 responding law libraries provided some services to self-represented litigants. Services included:

- traditional and computerized legal research help and referrals to other programs
- e-mail reference, pathfinders, guides, and explanations of the legal process
- legal information websites for self-represented parties
- collections of materials for the non-lawyer
- document delivery of resources in the library by fax, scan, and delivery referral sheets to their library
- chat reference
- court forms: forms instructions, forms in plain language, forms in multiple languages, form document assembly programs, assistance with filling out forms, forms creation, writing of form instructions
- public computers with access to the Internet
- e-filing support
- LEP service with books and/or brochures in multiple languages, bi-lingual staff, and provision for either interpreters or access to a language line, and
- services to prisoners.

Libraries hosting self-help centers and programs reported providing:

- legal clinics
- lawyer in the library programs
- mediation programs
- self-help centers either staffed by law library employees, hosted in the law library but staffed by another organization, or providing support for self-help centers in another location, and
- educational services such as workshops and webinars.

An earlier compilation, "Directory of Library-Based Self-Help Programs," lists 29 programs in 16 states and the District of Columbia, providing information about services offered and program administration.

== See also ==
- Law library
- Pro se legal representation in the United States
- Special library
