= Sacramento County Public Law Library =

Coordinates: 38.58473°N 121.49285°W

The Sacramento County Public Law Library (SCPLL) is a public law library in the capital city of the State of California. In 1891 the state of California enacted statutes mandating an independent law library in every county. Since its inception SCPLL has provided free public access to legal information.

Today, SCPLL is the sixth largest of California's 58 member libraries of the Council of California County Law Libraries (CCCLL), a statewide networking and advocacy organization. The organization has an active role in state legislative efforts in support of county law library funding.

== History ==
SCPLL was established on March 31, 1891, in the county courthouse with 6,237 volumes. In 1965 the law library moved along with the court to the new Gordon D. Schaber Sacramento County Courthouse Sacramento Superior Court at 720 9th Street. The law library was located in the basement of the courthouse.

From 1999 to 2010, a small branch library was maintained at the William R. Ridgeway Family Relations Courthouse on Power Inn Road.

In 2002, SCPLL's main branch relocated to the Sacramento Hall of Justice, a landmark building at 813 6th Street. This unique historic building, on the National Register of Historic Places, had undergone renovations in order to accommodate the library's collection.

In 2012, due to rising costs, the library moved to its current location at 609 9th Street, a block away from the County Superior Court in downtown Sacramento.

== Mission ==
Since its founding days, the mission of the law library has been to provide free access to legal information to the judiciary, to state and county officials, to members of the State Bar of California, and to all residents of the county. Today, the law library's primary patrons are members of the Sacramento County legal community and county residents representing themselves in legal matters. The library provides access to justice through resources to address civil legal issues.

== Organization and Governance ==
According to California statutes, California county law libraries operate independently from the County government where they reside.

The SCPLL is governed by a seven-member board of trustees made up of 5 Superior Court judges, a County Counsel Board of Supervisors delegate, and a local attorney appointed by the County Board of Supervisors. The law library, like other California county law libraries, is funded by a fixed percentage of the local county superior court civil filing fees, though the amount varies by county (dictated by statutes). Thus, County Law libraries are supported by civil litigants, their primary users, and are not funded by state and local taxes.

== Collection ==
The SCPLL is a practice library, focusing on practical materials for attorneys and the public. The law library acquires and maintains major California primary and secondary legal resources, in addition to certain U.S. federal and general legal publications and self-help legal materials written for lay people. The American Association of Law Libraries' "County Public Law Library Standards" is useful in the selection of resources.

The Law Library provides an online catalog that includes books, periodicals, audio recordings for attorney MCLE credit, CD-ROMS with forms, websites and has electronic access to thousands of additional titles including law journals, legal treatises, restatements, treaties and much more. Onsite access is free at the law library to a select group of legal databases including: Lexis Advance (includes Shepards), HeinOnline, Ebsco's Legal Information Reference Center (Nolo self-help ebooks), CEB's OnLAW, Wolters Kluwers's VitalLaw, and other e-subscriptions.

== Highlights of Services ==
- Saclaw.org website: Content for both the legal community and self-represented litigants including forms, self-help videos, and links to key legal resources.
- Legal Topic Search: Step-by-step guides and articles about common legal procedures and topics, created by our law librarians and available by subject on the Law Topic pages.
- Lawyers in the Library: Brief 20 minute consultation with an attorney for people who cannot afford traditional private legal services.
- Ask Now Law Librarian : Service for the general public to submit questions to law librarians statewide using the website's interactive chat feature.
- MCLE CD's for Self-Study : Audio-visual resources that meet minimum continuing legal education (MCLE) requirements for members of the California State Bar Association.
- Continuing Education Classes: A variety of live webinars with qualified speakers, and recorded programs offered by on-demand video.

== Self Help @ the Law Library (SH@LL), previously Civil Self Help Center ==
Law Library Self Help Books

In 2008 the Sacramento County Superior Court received a grant to help fund a civil self-help center to assist self-represented litigants with general civil matters. The Civil Self Help Center (CSHC) began as a joint project between the Sacramento Superior Court, the VLSP of Northern California (now known as Capital Pro Bono), and the Sacramento County Bar Association. When the Superior Court was faced with budget cuts and space constraints in 2009, the Law Library Director and Board of Trustees agreed to bring the CSHC into the Law Library as both provided assistance to self-represented litigants. The service changed its name to Self Help @ the Law Library (SH@LL) in November 2022.

Today SH@LL is staffed by attorneys and paralegals. The purpose of SH@LL is to provide general information and basic assistance to individual self-represented litigants with qualifying civil cases. Help is provided primarily by telephone, either through quick assistance, referrals, or through a limited number of individual appointments. The legal staff provides assistance with a narrow list of issues, including complaints and answers for simple civil cases, requests for default judgments and motions to set them aside; name changes; oppositions to civil forfeiture; guardianship, and limited probate assistance.

== Celebrating 125 Years of Service ==
In 2016, the SCPLL joined the Council of California County Law Libraries in a celebration of 125 years of providing services to individuals in the state. Senator Wolk introduced Senate Resolution S-83 in the 2015-2016 California Legislature commending California County Law Libraries and recognizing August 11, 2016 as “California County Law Library Day.” The adopted resolution recognized the national crisis and growing number of individuals who do not have access to legal representation, and the service law libraries provide for access to justice by assisting self-represented litigants. “California County law Libraries are an essential component of the justice system and reduce stress on the overburdened court system in the state.” The County of Sacramento and the City of Sacramento adopted similar resolutions.

== See also ==
- Public Law Libraries (U.S.)
- Law library
- Sacramento County, California
- Sacramento, California
- American Association of Law Libraries
- Sacramento County Superior Court
