= Index to Foreign Legal Periodicals =

- Discipline: Law
- Language: English

Publication details
- History: 1960–present
- Publisher: W.S. Hein Company on behalf of the American Association of Law Libraries (United States)

Standard abbreviations
- ISO 4: Index Foreign Leg. Period.

Indexing
- ISSN: 0019-400X

Links
- Journal homepage

Index to Foreign Legal Periodicals is a law journal published by the W.S. Hein Company on behalf of the American Association of Law Libraries. The journal was established in 1960 and indexes over 500 legal periodicals and yearbooks, as well as selected articles and book reviews from essay collections and congress reports dealing with public and private international law, comparative law, and the national law of all jurisdictions other than the United States, the United Kingdom, and some other states within the British Commonwealth.

The index is available on HeinOnline.
