= Federal Register Modernization Act =

- Long title: To amend chapter 15 of title 44, United States Code (commonly known as the Federal Register Act), to modernize the Federal Register, and for other purposes.
- Announced in: the 113th United States Congress
- Sponsored by: Rep. Darrell E. Issa (R, CA-49)
- Number of co-sponsors: 2

Codification
- U.S.C. sections affected: 44 U.S.C. § 1505, 44 U.S.C. § 1509, 44 U.S.C. § 1503, 44 U.S.C. § 1510, 44 U.S.C. § 1507, and others.
- Agencies affected: Administrative Committee of the Federal Register, United States Department of Justice, National Archives and Records Administration, Executive Office of the President, Government Printing Office

Legislative history
- Introduced in the House as H.R. 4195 by Rep. Darrell E. Issa (R, CA-49) on March 11, 2014; Committee consideration by United States House Committee on Oversight and Government Reform; Passed the House on July 14, 2014 (Roll Call Vote 405: 386-0)

The Federal Register Modernization Act (H.R. 4195) was a bill that would require the Federal Register to be published (e.g., by electronic means), rather than printed, and that documents in the Federal Register be made available for sale or distribution to the public in published form.

The bill was introduced into the United States House of Representatives during the 113th United States Congress. It passed the House on July 14, 2014.

== Background ==
The Federal Register is the official journal of the federal government of the United States that contains government agency rules, proposed rules, and public notices. It is published daily, except on federal holidays. The final rules promulgated by a federal agency and published in the Federal Register are ultimately reorganized by topic or subject matter and codified in the Code of Federal Regulations (CFR), which is updated annually. In essence, the Federal Register is a way for the government to announce changes to government requirements, policies and guidance to the public. The notice and comment process, as outlined in the Administrative Procedure Act, gives the people a chance to participate in agency rulemaking. Publication of documents in the Federal Register also constitutes constructive notice, and its contents are judicially noticed.

== Provisions of the bill ==
This summary is based largely on the summary provided by the Congressional Research Service, a public domain source.

The Federal Register Modernization Act would require the Federal Register to be published (e.g., by electronic means), rather than printed, and that documents in the Federal Register be made available for sale or distribution to the public in published form. The bill would revise requirements for the filing of documents with the Office of the Federal Register for inclusion in the Federal Register and for the publication of the Code of Federal Regulations to reflect the publication requirement.

== Congressional Budget Office report ==
This summary is based largely on the summary provided by the Congressional Budget Office, as ordered reported by the House Committee on Oversight and Government Reform on March 12, 2014. This is a public domain source.

The Congressional Budget Office (CBO) estimates that enacting H.R. 4195 would have no significant effect on the federal budget. The legislation would amend federal laws regarding the Federal Register and the Code of Federal Regulations (CFR), which provide comprehensive information about actions of the United States Government. The legislation would end requirements to print the Federal Register or the CFR and for agencies to provide multiple copies of their submissions to the Federal Register. The bill would change references from printing those publications to publishing them, and publishing could include making those publications available online.

Under the Federal Register Act, the Office of the Federal Register (OFR) within the National Archives and Records Administration (NARA) produces the Federal Register. That publication compiles and organizes thousands of rules, regulations, executive orders, presidential documents, and notices generated by federal departments and agencies. Currently, the Federal Register is updated daily and is printed and published Monday through Friday, except federal holidays. The OFR, working with the Government Printing Office (GPO), has made the Federal Register available online since 1994. In addition, the OFR produces the CFR, which contains all agency rules that first appeared in the Federal Register.

Under the legislation, OFR would no longer be required to print the Federal Register or CFR, but would still have to make it available online. Based on information from NARA and GPO, CBO expects that copies of the Federal Register and CFR would continue to be produced following enactment of H.R. 4195 to meet the demand for printed documents. We expect agencies’ administrative costs would be reduced because fewer copies of printed material would be submitted to the Federal Register, but we estimate that any such savings over the next five years would be small because most of the costs associated with the submission of those documents involves their preparation, not their duplication.

H.R. 4195 contains no intergovernmental or private-sector mandates as defined in the Unfunded Mandates Reform Act and would impose no costs on state, local, or tribal governments.

== Procedural history ==
The Federal Register Modernization Act was introduced into the United States House of Representatives on March 11, 2013, by Rep. Darrell E. Issa (R, CA-49). It was referred to the United States House Committee on Oversight and Government Reform. On March 12, 2014, the Committee order the bill to be reported in a voice vote. On July 3, 2014, it was reported alongside House Report 113-515. On July 14, 2014, the House voted in Roll Call Vote 405 to pass the bill 386–0.

== Debate and discussion ==
The American Association of Law Libraries (AALL) strongly opposed the bill, arguing that the bill "undermines" citizens' "right to be informed" by making it more difficult for "citizens to find their government's regulations." According to AALL, a survey they conducted "revealed that members of the public, librarians, researchers, students, attorneys, and small business owners continue to rely on the print" version of the Federal Register. AALL also argued that the lack of print versions of the Federal Register and CFR would mean the 15 percent of Americans who don't use the internet would lose their access to that material.

== See also ==
- List of bills in the 113th United States Congress
