= Rosamond Parma =

American law librarian (1884–1946)

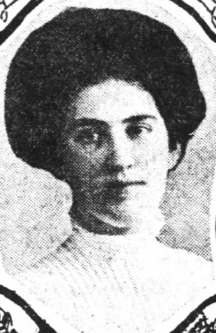
- Rosamond Parma as a college student, from a 1908 newspaper.
- Born: 1884; Santa Barbara, California
- Died: October 24, 1946 (aged 61–62); Santa Barbara, California
- Occupation: law librarian

Rosamond Thomas Parma (1884 – October 24, 1946) was an American law librarian. She was the first law librarian at the University of California, Berkeley, and the first woman president of the American Association of Law Libraries (AALL). She was inducted into the AALL Hall of Fame in 2010, and into the California Library Hall of Fame in 2016.

== Early life ==
Rosamond Thomas Parma was born in Santa Barbara, California, the daughter of Italian immigrants G. B. Parma and Catarina Parma. Her father grew oranges. She graduated from Santa Barbara High School in 1901, and earned a bachelor's degree at the University of California In 1908. She was one of the founding members of the school's chapter of the Sigma Kappa sorority. In 1919 she was awarded a Juris Doctor degree, also from the University of California.

== Career ==
Parma taught school briefly, in Lompoc, California right after college. She returned to the university to become the first law librarian at the UC Berkeley School of Law, running the library and developing the collection at Boalt Hall from 1911 to 1935. She taught law librarianship and law bibliography at Berkeley after 1922, and in 1925 was described as one of the only women teaching in a law school in the United States. In 1928, she toured other American law libraries for her work. She was manager of the California Law Review from 1928 to 1935. She retired in 1935. "Neither the formal record of her titles nor the twenty-four years of service, however, reveal her intense devotion to the well-being of students, faculty, and alumni, and to the development of the law library," noted a colleague in the law review.

From 1930 to 1932, she was president of the American Association of Law Librarians (AALL). She was the first woman to hold that leadership position. In 1934, she traveled to the annual meeting of the Special Libraries Association in New York, and to Montreal for the AALL meeting that year; then extended her travels to Europe, including a visit to Rome. In 1937, she was elected a life member of the American Association of Law Libraries (AALL). She was one of the first inductees into the AALL Hall of Fame in 2010, and was inducted into the California Library Hall of Fame in 2016.

== Personal life ==
Parma took temporary leave of the university in 1914, returning to Santa Barbara to recover from complications following an appendectomy. She died in 1946, aged 62, in Santa Barbara, California.
