= California Law Review =

- Discipline: Law review
- Language: English

Publication details
- History: 1912–present
- Publisher: University of California, Berkeley, School of Law (United States)
- Frequency: Bimonthly
- Impact factor: 2.155 (2014)

Standard abbreviations
- Bluebook: Calif. L. Rev.
- ISO 4: Calif. Law Rev.

Indexing
- ISSN: 0008-1221
- JSTOR: 00081221

Links
- Journal homepage

The California Law Review (also referred to as CLR) is the journal of the University of California, Berkeley, School of Law. It was established in 1912. The application process consists of an anonymous write-on competition, with grades playing no role in the consideration of membership. A personal statement is also considered.

Among United States law journals, CLR is ranked fifth by Washington and Lee University Law School and fifth by a professor at the University of Oregon School of Journalism and Communication.

== History ==
California Law Review was the first student-run law review in the Western United States. It is the ninth-oldest surviving law review published in the United States.

A companion volume, the California Law Review Online, was launched in 2010, followed by a podcast in 2021. These publications feature shorter articles, essays, blogs, and audio content.

== Notable alumni ==
Past editors and contributors have included

- Chief Justice Roger J. Traynor (former editor-in-chief),
- Justice Kathryn Werdegar (former editor-in-chief)
- Justice Allen Broussard
- Chief Justice Rose Bird
- Ninth Circuit Judge Marsha Berzon
- Ambassador Jeff Bleich (former editor-in-chief)
- Former United States Solicitor General Theodore Olson
- Professor Christopher Schroeder (former editor-in-chief)
- Professor Barbara Armstrong, the first female law professor in the United States
- Defense attorneys Tony Serra and Michael Tigar
- Los Angeles trial lawyer and author Merrill K. Albert (revising editor, 1955)
- Law librarian Rosamond Parma (manager, 1928–1935)
