= A. Mercer Daniel =

African American librarian, lawyer, and educator

- Born: May 27, 1887; Rochester, New York, US
- Died: February 17, 1976 (aged 88); Washington, D.C., US
- Education: Howard University
- Occupations: Librarian, lawyer, educator

A. Mercer Daniel (May 27, 1887 – February 17, 1976) was an American law librarian and the first African American member of American Association of Law Libraries. He worked as a librarian for the United States Department of War, and later went on to serve as a librarian for the Howard University School of Law for more than thirty-five years. Daniel worked to oppose racial discrimination throughout his career and was an activist before and during the civil rights movement.

== Early life and education ==
Allen Mercer Daniel was born in Rochester, New York, on May 27, 1887. Daniel was raised in Harper's Ferry, West Virginia; his parents were both alumni of Storer College and ran Lockwood House, a hotel and boarding house. While a teenager, Daniel helped edit author Joseph Barry's book The Strange Story of Harper's Ferry.

Daniel received a business degree from Howard University in 1906. He went on to graduate from Howard University's Law School in 1909. He was admitted to the District of Columbia Bar and worked as a lawyer at the War Department for several years.

He married Portia Bird in 1910; they had one son, A. Mercer Daniel Jr.

== Career as librarian and educator ==
Daniel worked as the librarian in the Office of the Chief of Finance within the U.S. Department of War beginning in 1909. During this period he also worked as a correspondent for the African American newspaper The McDowell Times, published in Keystone, West Virginia.

He took a part-time position at the Howard University Law Library in 1923 as an assistant to the librarian. In 1924 he moved onto a permanent position as Assistant Librarian. Due in large part to Daniel's efforts, Howard's law library grew significantly during this period and by 1933, when Daniel was acting director of the library, the library met the American Bar Association standards and was admitted to the American Association of Law Libraries. Daniel thus became the first African American member of AALL.

=== Work with American Association of Law Libraries ===
Daniel was an active member of AALL. He was the first African American to run for an executive board position with the organization. He was a charter member of the D.C. AALL chapter, Law Librarians' Society of Washington, D.C., when it was founded in 1939. Daniel chaired three AALL committees and served on many more throughout his career.

Daniel faced significant discrimination during his career, with AALL staff frequently expressing resentment at his requests for equal accommodations in travel and lodging in attending conferences. In 1935, the AALL held their conference in Denver, Colorado, and AALL staff advised him that the Brown Palace Hotel would not permit him to use the dining room or lobby. The membership of AALL decided to hold the 1941 convention at the Chamberlin Hotel in Old Point Comfort, Virginia, which would not allow African Americans; Daniel was forced to miss attending his first conference since joining AALL in 1933. In 1954, when AALL hosted its conference in Miami, Florida, Daniel was allowed within the dining room "only on condition that he be accompanied by two or more white members".

=== Later career ===
In 1940 Daniel was appointed the law librarian and took on the role of assistant professor of law at Howard. He served as the acting dean of the Howard University School of Law multiple times, including the summer of 1954. When Daniel retired from the law library in 1956, the library's collection had tripled in sized in twenty-five years.

== Activism ==
Daniel participated in activism against racial discrimination at many points throughout his life, including fighting to have blacks nominated to attend the Military Academy at West Point. He led a protest after the 1915 lynching death of Leo Frank, a Jewish man convicted of the murder of a white teenager. Daniel referred to the lynching as a "fiendish crime" and used the case to call for federal legislation against lynching and mob violence.

While researching the legal history of discrimination in Washington, D.C. during Howard students' sit-in activism in 1943–1944, Daniel discovered what were later referred to as D.C.'s "lost laws". These two laws were published in 1872 and 1873 and prohibited segregation in restaurants in D.C.; the laws were later found to be still in effect despite not being included in D.C.'s 1901 legal code, and were used by the Coordinating Committee for the Enforcement of the D.C Anti-Discrimination Laws to force a legal end to discrimination in Washington.

== Retirement and death ==
After retiring from Howard University and being named Librarian Emeritus in 1956, Daniel continued his scholarship, including book reviews and other commentary in journals such as the Journal of Negro History and Howard Law Journal. He was considered a scholar on abolitionist John Brown and wrote about Brown's raid and other aspects of the history of Harper's Ferry, where he grew up.

Daniel died February 17, 1976, in Washington, D.C.

== Legacy ==
In October 1971, Howard University's law library was renamed the Allen Mercer Daniel Law Library. During his time at Howard, Daniel developed a relationship with student Thurgood Marshall, who assisted in the efforts to create Howard Law School's first library card catalog in 1933; Marshall attended and spoke at the dedication ceremony.

In 2010 Daniel was inducted into the inaugural class of the American Association of Law Libraries Hall of Fame.
