= Alkali Flat/La Valentina station =

Light rail station in Sacramento, California

Alkali Flat/La Valentina
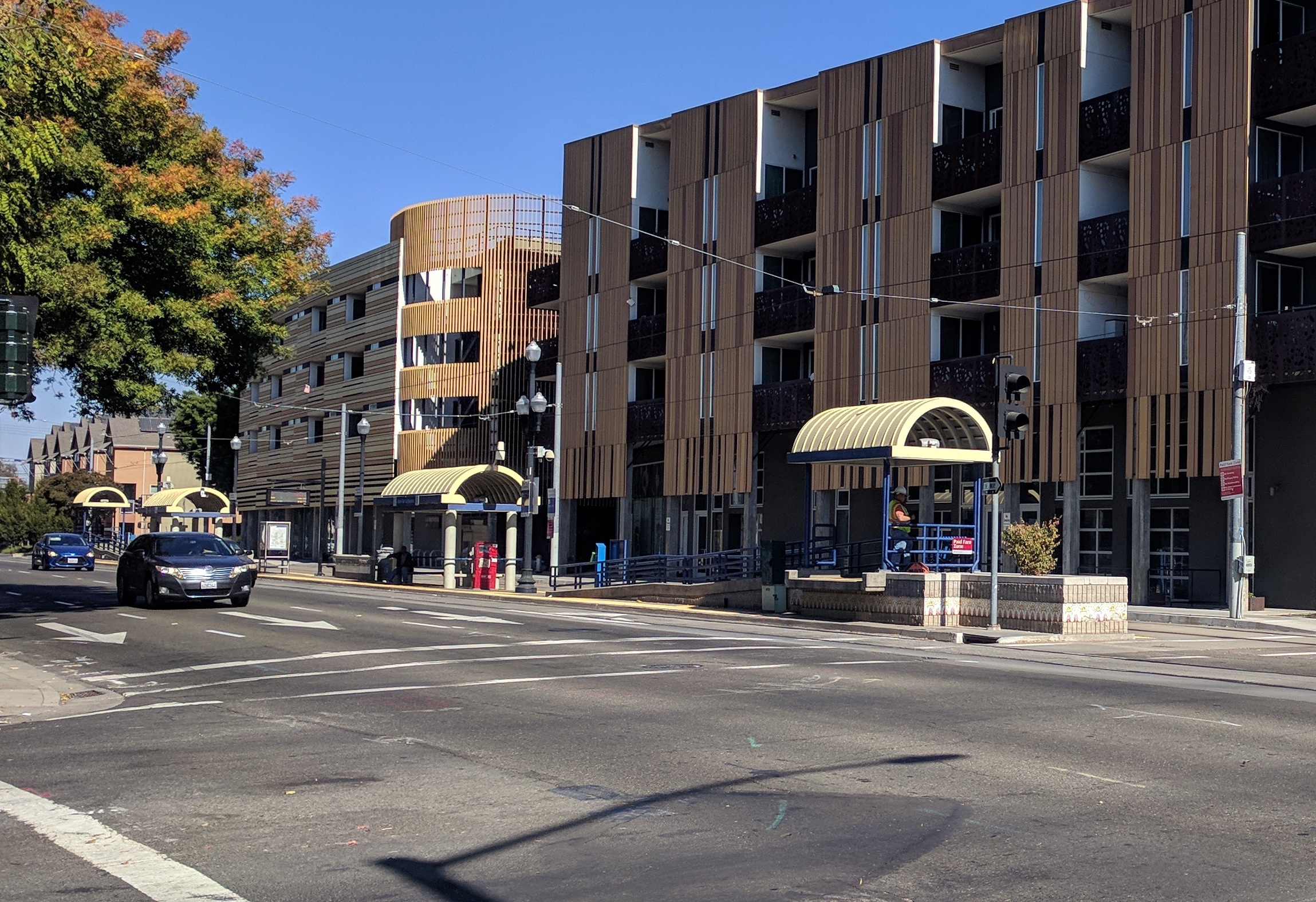
- Alkali Flat station in October 2018

General information
- Location: 12th Street at D Street; Sacramento, California; United States
- Coordinates: 38°35′8″N 121°29′17″W
- Owner: Sacramento Regional Transit District
- Platforms: 1 island platform
- Tracks: 2
- Connections: Sacramento Regional Transit: 133

Construction
- Structure type: At-grade
- Accessible: Yes

History
- Opened: March 12, 1987

Services
Preceding station	SacRT	Following station
Dos Rios toward Watt/I-80	Blue Line	12th & I toward Cosumnes River College
Location

Alkali Flat/La Valentina station is an at-grade light rail station on the Blue Line of the SacRT light rail system operated by the Sacramento Regional Transit District. The station is located alongside 12th Street at its intersection with D Street, in the Alkali Flat Historic District, after which the station is named, in the city of Sacramento, California.
