= HeinOnline =

Online database for legal materials

- ...a premier online legal history database...
- Producer: William S. Hein & Co. (United States)
- History: 2000–present

Access
- Cost: Subscription

Coverage
- Disciplines: Law, legal history
- Format coverage: Journals, gazettes, books, articles, case law

Links
- Website: home.heinonline.org
- Title list(s): home.heinonline.org/content/

HeinOnline (HOL) is a commercial internet database service launched in 2000 by William S. Hein & Co. (WSH Co), a Buffalo, New York publisher specializing in legal materials. The company was founded in Buffalo, New York, in 1961, and is currently based in nearby Getzville, New York. In 2013, WSH Co. was the 33rd largest private company in western New York, with revenues of around $33 million and more than seventy employees.

HeinOnline is a source for traditional legal materials (reported cases, statutes, government regulations, academic law reviews, commercially produced law journals and magazines, and classic treatises), historical, governmental, and political documents, legislative debates, legislative and executive branch reports, world constitutions, international treaties, and reports and other documents of international organizations. The database includes more than 192 million pages of materials "in an online, fully searchable, image-based format".

== New product award ==
In 2001, HeinOnline received the coveted "New Product Award", from the American Association of Law Libraries. Since then HOL has received this award two more times in recognition of new content libraries added to its constantly expanding database. In 2002, HOL was named as a "Best Commercial Website" by the International Association of Law Libraries. In 2007, EContent Magazine listed HOL among the hundred "companies that matter most in the digital content industry". The list "represents the best and the brightest digital content companies". More recently HOL's World's Constitutions Illustrated was named by Choice magazine as an "Outstanding Title" for 2010. A little more than a decade after HOL went live, a publication of the American Association of Law Libraries referred to it as a "groundbreaking product" and as "a leader in online legal literature".

== 2013 survey ==
In 2013, a survey of law librarians ranked HeinOnline as one of the three most popular "subscription databases" among law libraries throughout the world. This survey ranked HOL just behind the much larger and more highly capitalized Westlaw and LexisNexis. According to this survey, conducted by a London-based law librarian, "These top three easily dominated the subscription database market across all major law libraries, across the world." They also "dominated University law school libraries". Significantly, among "Research Institute Libraries" HOL ranked first while the much larger Lexis and Westlaw dropped to third and fourth. HOL and Westlaw were tied for first among the most popular "subscription databases" in Public Libraries. Among North American law libraries HOL, Lexis and Westlaw were tied for the highest number of subscriptions, in Asia (excluding the Middle East) HOL was tied with Lexis for second place behind Westlaw and in Europe HOL ranked third, behind Westlaw and Lexis. This suggests that the smaller HOL has as great a presence at home and nearly so in Europe and Asia as its much larger competitors, but that it has been less successful in penetrating markets in Africa, Latin America, Australia/New Zealand, and the Middle East.

== 2010 survey ==
In 2010, a survey found that 72% of all law firms subscribed to HeinOnline. The author of this article noted that "Academic law libraries quickly embraced HeinOnline in its early years" but expressed "surprise" by "the popularity of HeinOnline in law firms, at 72%." The explanation for this unexpected survey result rested on economic considerations interwoven with HOL's content: "as law firms reduced office space dedicated to print collections, the ever-increasing breadth of HeinOnline's historical, and now more current, publications has made it a pragmatic and sound business investment." This analysis dovetailed with earlier explanations by law firm librarians.

== Description ==
All materials on HeinOnline are available as downloadable and searchable PDFs of the original and complete documents. Unlike its major competitors, HOL does not keyboard the content of documents, cases, and statutes, but instead scans them with high-end optical scanning technology. This approach avoids the introduction of typographical errors. In addition, other competitors often edit or delete cases and documents, or change pagination, formatting, and the use of various typefaces such as italics. Because of HOL's use of pdfs of all original documents, the materials appear exactly as they did in the original publication.

HeinOnline initially focused on traditional legal materials. Indeed, when first released, HOL provided full online access to only 25 academic law reviews, but by 2006 the database of law reviews had expanded to more than 800 journals. Starting in 2007, HOL provided full-text searchable access to "every 'flagship' law review published by an accredited U.S. law school." At the time of HeinOnline’s inception, Lexis and Westlaw did not offer access to older law reviews, but only to those published since the 1980s. Thus, HOL initially envisioned itself mainly as a historical archive, but this changed due to market demands by professors, scholars, and law librarians, who wanted access to HOL's scans of the more recent journal issues as well, rather than the keyboarded version in Westlaw and Lexis.

== Expansion ==
Even before HOL expanded to include all new law review issues, it was adding other material, starting with the Federal Register in 2002 and a Supreme Court library that included PDFs of all volumes of United States Reports. Significantly, Hein offered the full and complete version of all reported cases, while its competitors often provided truncated and edited versions, with changes in spelling or punctuation to reflect modern usage. This was especially true for 19th century cases, which contained extensive lawyers' arguments in the U.S. Reports. These were often deleted in the Lexis and Westlaw versions, but are fully available on HOL. Libraries of Treaties and Agreements, legal classics, U.S. Statutes at Large, all Federal Regulations (including those that had been long superseded) were added by 2007, and more material including extensive state material followed.

HeinOnline has now expanded to include reports and proceedings of federal, state, and local governments and agencies, modern books, non-academic law reviews and journals, current legal periodicals, foreign law reports and statutes, legislative and executive branch reports from foreign governments and NGOs, annual reports of numerous non-legal organizations (such as nineteenth-century antislavery societies, religious organizations, and medical societies), reports from historical international organizations (such as the League of Nations) and modern international organizations (such as the United Nations). HOL has placed online, in word-searchable format, virtually all known historical legal periodicals in English. The Chief Law Librarian at a major Canadian law school referred to this project as "the epic work of HeinOnline".

== Collections ==
Among its collections, HOL has a full run of the complete reports in PDF form of all U.S. federal statutes, all U.S. Supreme Court reports, lower federal court reports, reports of the U.S. Customs Court, Tax Court Memorandum Decisions, and Board of Bankruptcy Courts. HOL contains all published debates in Congress, starting with the Annals of Congress in 1789 and is beginning to add published committee reports from Congress, executive branch reports, administrative law reports and decisions, all colonial and state statutes and reported cases, congressional hearings, and full runs of reports and documents from numerous federal agencies.

Materials come from all English-speaking nations, but the database also includes a great deal of other foreign materials. These include the Israel Law Reports, the Index to Foreign Legal Periodicals (IFLP), materials from the European Centre for Minority Issues, "comprehensive coverage of student-run law reviews relating to Chinese law", and a Foreign and International Law Library.

HeinOnline carries a number of sources which are otherwise unavailable from competing database products. For example, it has PDFs of scans of the entire Federal Register, which is updated on a daily basis. Its library of law journal articles differs from competitors' star-paginated plain text versions. Because Hein uses PDFs, rather than keyboarded text, every document shows original pagination, punctuation, spelling and typesetting. However, as with any electronic product, there are occasional scanning errors. The use of fully searchable PDFs is significant since many similar databases do not provide full texts of even all U.S. Supreme Court reports, and keyboarded texts of opinions also often do not include italics and other typeface distinctions found in opinions, especially in the 18th and 19th centuries. Furthermore, because nothing in Hein has been keyboarded, no typographical errors have been introduced into the text.

== New books ==
In addition to publishing new books and other materials, Hein has become the publisher and the repository for a number of third parties. For example, Hein publishes the Index to Foreign Legal Periodicals (IFLP) for the American Association of Law Libraries. Most of the more than 500 periodicals indexed in IFLP are also available in full-text versions through HOL. In addition to traditional periodicals, the IFLP also provides index access to more than 50 collections of essays, conference proceedings, and festschriften. Some of these books are also available on HOL in full text. Chinese legal scholars praise HOL because it is a "robust legal research portal and discovery platform" that "provides multiple starting points for legal researchers to access more specific legal topics because secondary sources, such as journal articles and chapters in monographs, are cross-linked with primary sources…"

== Slavery reports ==
In 2016, Hein launched "Slavery in America and the World: History, Culture, & Law." Unlike other Hein products, access to this on-line collection is completely free, and available to anyone in the world simply by registering at: Slavery in America and the World: History, Culture & Law It contains virtually every reported state and federal case on slavery, every state and federal case on slavery, and more than 1,250 books and pamphlets dating from the eighteenth century to the present. Many of the items have introductions by the General Editor of the library, slavery historian Paul Finkelman. Hein continues to add to the library every month. In March, 2017 an article in the official publication of the Association of Independent Information Professionals praised this new collection, noting "Hein also believes in corporate citizenship: In October 2016, it released its collection, Slavery in America and the World: History, Culture & Law. Freely available to anyone with Internet access."

The emergence of HeinOnline reflects trends in law librarianship as well as economic changes. In an interview setting, librarians at law firms noted that access to the Federal Register and every law review ever published in the United States allowed their firms to discard bound volumes, reduce subscriptions to some materials, and at the same time reduce the need to order materials on inter-library loan. The director of the library at one of the largest firms in Chicago noted, "We cancelled subscriptions, got rid of the bound volumes, and reduced the amount of borrowings we needed to do at the Cook County Law Library and other local law libraries." As a journalist noted in writing a history of HOL, the online product has allowed all libraries to cope with "the over burgeoning shelf space devoted to law reviews".

== Peer review ==
In a 2017 "Peer Review" of HeinOnline, in Connections, the official publication of the Association of Independent Information Professionals, Dan Odenwald, of Capstone Information Services & Consulting, noted that "With material dating to 13th century English Law Reports through contemporary American statutes and commentary, Hein is an indispensable tool in many research arsenals, providing access to current must-haves as well as historical obscurities." Odenwald described HeinOnline as "a cornucopia of legal research treasures". In this review he also noted the "oft-repeated drawback to Hein is the lack of editorial enhancements like those on LexisNexis and Westlaw" such as its lack of "annotated codes, case law summaries nor formal legal citation services." At the same time, he praised Hein because "Search help and history are easily located; document printing and downloading are simple; and customer supports – training guides, webinars, live chat and toll-free hotlines – are ubiquitous."
