= Mesick House =

Historic house in California, United States

- U.S. National Register of Historic Places
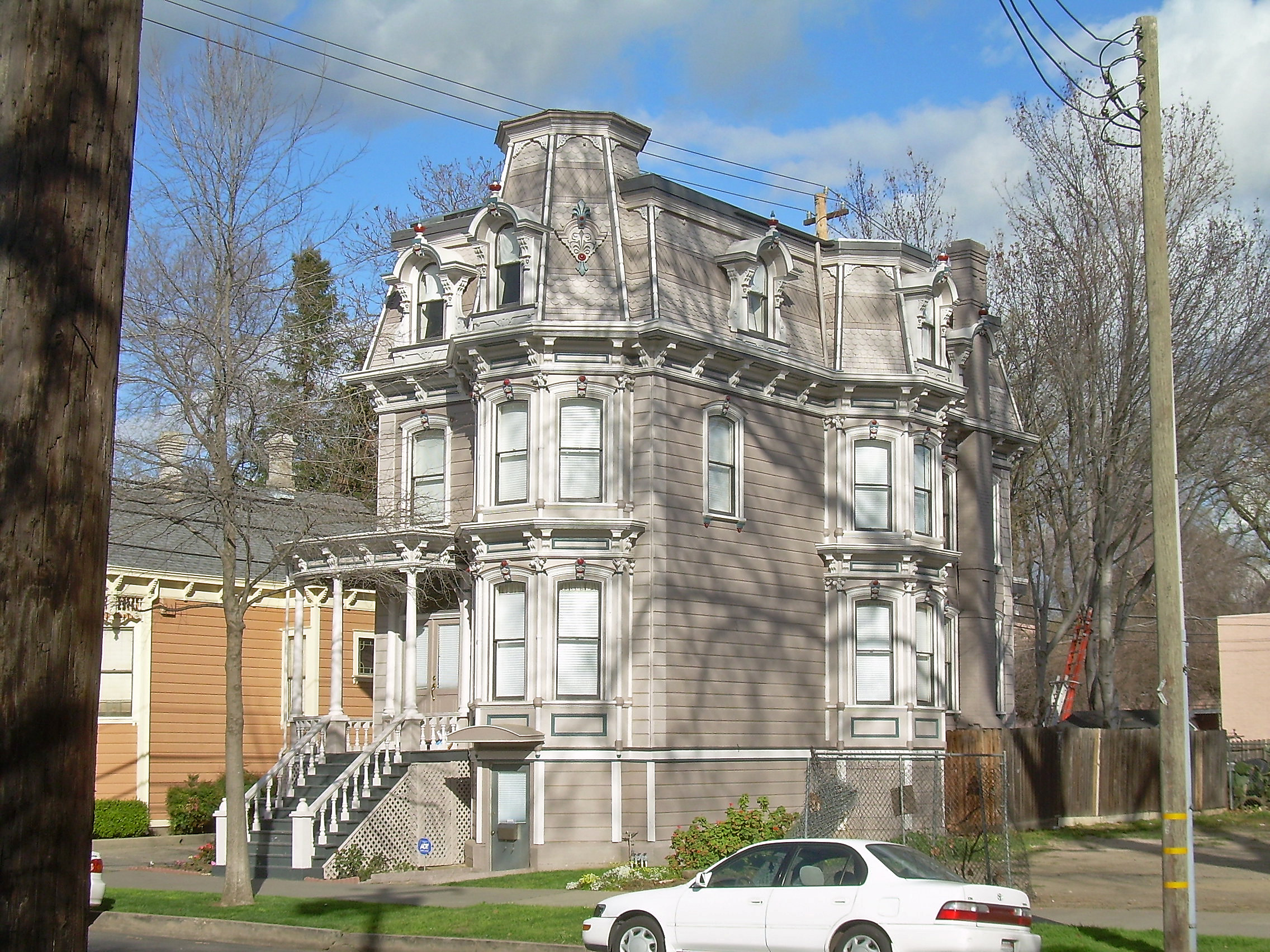

- Location within Sacramento, California Location within California Location within the United States
- Location: 517 8th St., Sacramento, California
- Coordinates: 38°35′8.98″N 121°29′37.99″W
- Built: 1875
- Architect: Nathaniel Goodell
- Architectural style: Second Empire, Italianate
- NRHP reference No.: 82002236
- Added to NRHP: January 21, 1982

Mesick House is a historic home constructed in 1875 in the Second Empire and Italianate Victorian architecture styles. It is one of four High Victorians remaining in Sacramento that display a mansard roof (the others being Stanford Mansion, Heilbron Mansion, and Governors Mansion).

The home gets its name from its original owner, Mary Mesick.

It is located at 517 8th Street, Sacramento, California.

== See also ==
- Sacramento, California
