= American Association of Law Libraries =

American nonprofit membership association of law library professionals

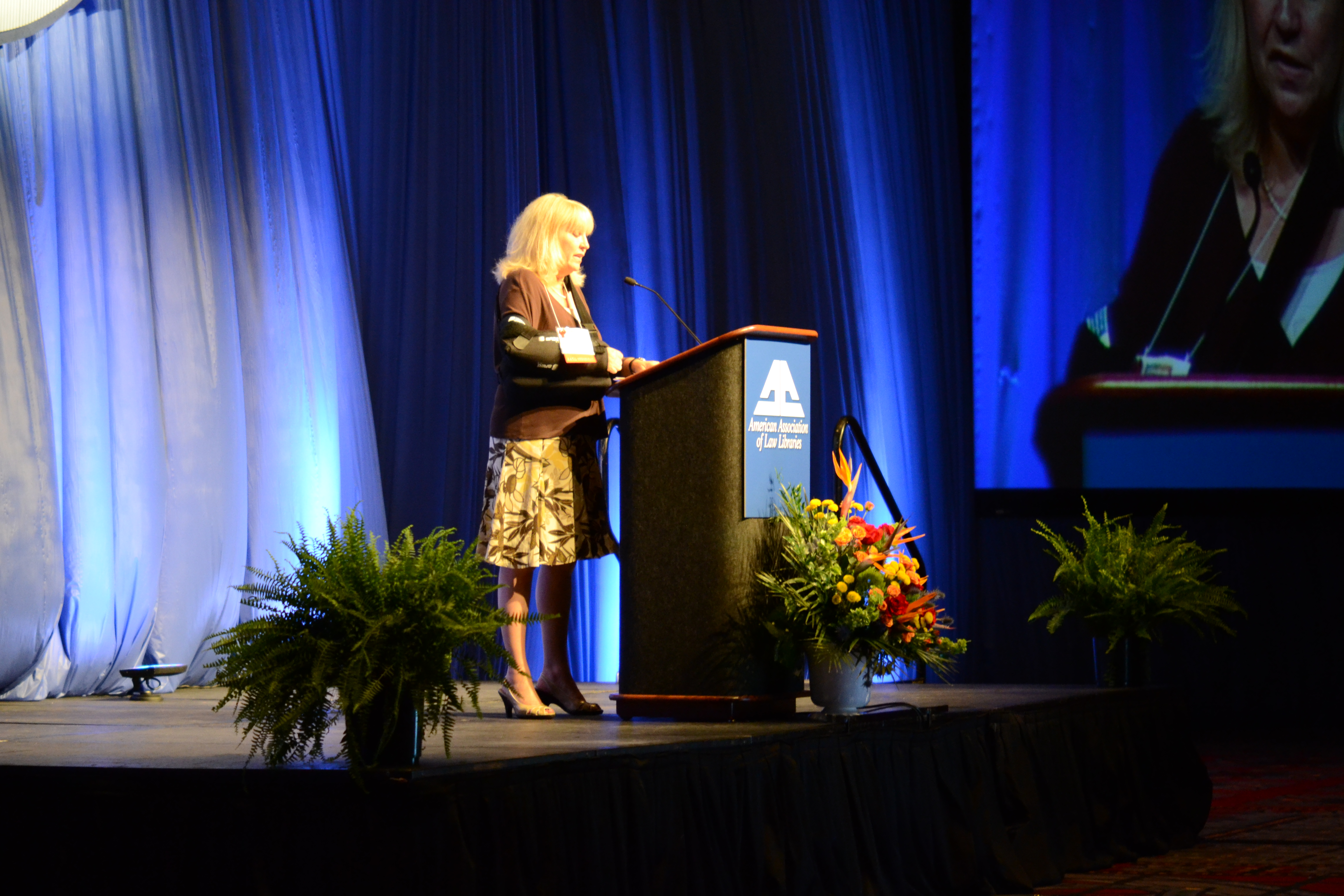
- Abbreviation: AALL
- Formation: 1906
- Founder: A.J. Small
- Legal status: Nonprofit educational organization
- Headquarters: Chicago, Illinois
- Region served: United States
- Members: 5,000
- Website: www.aallnet.org

The American Association of Law Libraries (AALL) is a nonprofit educational organization with over 5,000 members across the United States. AALL's mission is to promote and enhance the value of law libraries to the legal and public communities, to foster the profession of law librarianship, and to provide leadership in the field of legal information and information policy."

== History and vision ==
AALL was founded in 1906. The American Association of Law Libraries' vision is to be

a thriving professional association whose members and libraries – whether physical or virtual legal information services – are recognized as critical to the success of their organizations and as central to society. AALL members possess the knowledge and skills to maintain effectiveness in a constantly changing legal environment. Since the ready availability of legal information is a necessary requirement for a just and democratic society, AALL and its members advocate and work toward fair and equitable access to authentic current and historic legal information, and educate and train library users to be knowledgeable and skilled legal information consumers.

The first president of the AALL was Arthur James Small (1869–1937), who was elected at the association's formation on July 2, 1906. Small was a law librarian at the Iowa State Library, and it was his idea to create an organization separate from the American Library Association specifically for law librarianship. Small never graduated high school or attended college, yet he successfully served the Iowa State Library for over forty years.

Frederick C. Hicks (1875–1956) was another early president who greatly contributed to the AALL's vision. Hicks was a law librarian at both Yale and Columbia. In 1919, Hicks was first elected president of the AALL. He served two terms as president, 1919–1920 and 1920–1921. In 1923, Hicks authored Materials and Methods of Legal Research. Prior to the publication of this book, there were very few legal research texts keeping pace with the explosive growth in casebooks and legal literature. Hicks was also a major proponent of expanding the scope of the AALL's Law Library Journal. Prior to Hicks's input, the Journal mostly served as a depository for AALL committee reports. Hicks believed an expanded Journal could cover multiple aspects of law librarianship, ranging from scholarly articles to industry news.

The first woman to be elected AALL president was Rosamond Parma (1884–1946). She served two terms from 1930 to 1932. Parma was also the first law librarian for the University of California, serving as director of UC Berkeley's Boalt Hall library from 1911 to 1935. She also managed the California Law Review.

A. Mercer Daniel was the first African-American member to be admitted to AALL in 1933, and was inducted into the inaugural class of the AALL Hall of Fame in 2010. Daniel faced significant discrimination, with AALL staff frequently expressing resentment at his requests for equal accommodations in travel and lodging in attending conferences throughout the 1930s, 1940s, and 1950s.

Harry Bitner (1916–2001), who served as president for 1963–1964, helped elevate the position of law librarian from an under-educated service position to today's highly skilled specialists. Bitner outlined his thoughts in a Law Library Journal essay titled "The Educational Background of the University's Law Librarian" where he advocated college, library school, and law school degrees for new law librarians. In 1953, Bitner, along with Miles O. Price, authored Effective Legal Research. This work updated and advanced many of the themes first presented in Hick's Materials and Methods of Legal Research. As president, Bitner was instrumental in establishing a permanent headquarters for the AALL.

== Advocacy ==
The AALL and its members have a long history of proactively influencing policy initiatives in the legal information field. The 1970s were the beginning of the modern era of AALL advocacy. This decade saw the association helping to provide input and shape several important policy issues such as the 1975 Federal Trade Commission's Guides for the Law Book Industry, the Copyright Act of 1976, and the 1972 and 1978 amendments to Title 44 of the United States Code.

In 2013, AALL's Government Relations Office staff, along with local chapters and AALL members, held the first Local Advocate Lobby Day. This event consists of visits to House and Senate offices to raise the profile of information policy issues pertinent to the AALL.

AALL took a strong position against the Federal Register Modernization Act (H.R. 4195; 113th Congress), a bill that would require the Federal Register to be published (e.g., by electronic means), rather than printed, and that documents in the Federal Register be made available for sale or distribution to the public in published form. AALL argued that the bill "undermines" citizens' "right to be informed" by making it more difficult for "citizens to find their government's regulations." According to AALL, a survey they conducted "revealed that members of the public, librarians, researchers, students, attorneys, and small business owners continue to rely on the print" version of the Federal Register. AALL also argued that the lack of print versions of the Federal Register and CFR would mean the 15 percent of Americans who don't use the internet would lose their access to that material.

=== Access to Legal Information ===
The American Association of Law Libraries has been supporting free access to Pacer information for decades. In February 2019 the AALL joined with 15 organization and signed a letter calling for passage of H.R. 6714 the Electronic Records Reform Act. In addition to requiring free access to the federal dockets and documents, the legislation directs the Administrative Office of the US Courts to consolidate the Case Management/Electronic Case Files system into a single system. Additionally this year the AALL joined the American Civil Liberties Union and several other organizations on an amicus brief in response to National Veterans Legal Services Program et al v. United States of America supporting the idea that the First Amendment guarantees the public a right of access to judicial records through PACER. The case is currently before the United States Courts of Appeals for the Federal Circuit.

== Publication ==
The primary publication produced by AALL is the quarterly Law Library Journal. In 1907, Frederick W. Schenk made the recommendation for both a quarterly journal and index. The Law Library Journal has been the official publication of AALL since 1908 and contains scholarly articles on law, legal materials, legal research, and librarianship. The AALL also produces a monthly magazine, The AALL Spectrum. Furthermore, the AALL was the first publisher of the Index to Legal Periodicals, including it with the Law Library Journal beginning in 1908. Printing of the Index to Legal Periodicals was passed to the H.W. Wilson Company in April 1912, and the company assumed business management duties of the Index in 1914. The AALL publishes a monthly eNewsletter, as well as periodic eBriefings. Many current AALL publications, such as AALL Biennial Salary Survey, AALL Price Index for Legal Publications, and Guide to Fair Business Practices are focused on law librarianship advocacy. AALL also produces the Index to Foreign Legal Periodicals, an index providing multilingual coverage of foreign, international, and comparative legal journals.

== See also ==
- List of sources of law in the United States
- Public Law Libraries (U.S.)
- Law library
- List of libraries in the United States
