= Amy Aiken =

American entrepreneur and winemaker

- Born: Milwaukee, Wisconsin
- Citizenship: United States
- Education: Horticulture, University of Wisconsin–Madison, Plant Pathology, University of California, Davis
- Occupations: Winemaker; Entrepreneur
- Years active: 2000-present
- Employer: Meander Wines Conspire Wines
- Known for: Cabernet Sauvignon wine
- Spouse: Joel Aiken
- Children: Michael Aiken, Andrew Aiken

Amy Aiken is an American entrepreneur and winemaker. She focuses on Cabernet Sauvignon wines and owns her own wine labels: Meander and Conspire.

== Personal life and education ==
Aiken grew up in Milwaukee, Wisconsin and her first job was at a plant nursery. She first started studying engineering when she went to college. She instead earned her Bachelor of Science from the University of Wisconsin–Madison in Horticulture. After graduation, she moved to California. She attended the University of California, Davis for Plant Pathology. She graduated in 1989. She is married to winemaker Joel Aiken. They have two sons and live in St. Helena, California.

== Career ==
Aiken's first wine industry job after obtaining her Master's degree was at Joseph Phelps Vineyards. She worked during the crush season, working in the labs making Cabernet Sauvignon wine. She made Joseph Phelps wines such as Backus, Eisele, and Insignia. She has also made sparkling at Domaine Chandon California and Pinot noir and Chardonnay wines. She also worked for Viader Vineyards, Oakville Ranch, and Anomaly Vineyards.

=== Meander and Conspire Wines ===
Aiken founded her own wine brand in 2000, called Meander Wines. The wine is named after her sons, Mitchell and Andrew. Her wines are made from Napa Valley fruit, with a focus on Cabernet Sauvignon. When she started Meander, she had to wait three years before she was able to acquire fruit. She received a phone call from vintner Gary Morisoli in 2003. She paid $8,200 for a ton of Cabernet Sauvignon grapes from Morisoli. The grapes came from the Rutherford AVA. Those grapes were blended with additional Cabernet Sauvignon fruit from a St. Helena based vineyard called Lewelling. She makes her wine at various locations in the Napa Valley. The wine is aged for 18 months in 100 percent French Oak barrels that are made of 65 percent new wood. The first vintage was the 2003 Meander Cabernet Sauvignon.

She also makes Conspire, which focuses on non-Cabernet Sauvignon wines. Conspire wines include a Sauvignon blanc. The 2009 Sauvignon blanc used a Musqué clone from the Rutherford AVA. It was then blended with another Sauvignon Blanc from Whitehall Lane, also in the Rutherford AVA. The wine is aged for five months in a stainless steel tank before being cold stabilized before bottling. Conspire also sells a Pinot noir. The 2008 Pinot noir used fruit from a vineyard called Du-Nah in Sebastopol. The Pinot is fermented with wild yeast. It gets aged in 33 percent new, 100 percent French Oak barrels for sixteen months.

Amy and her husband Joel are partners in Palisades Wine Company in Calistoga where they make their wines.
