= Oak Knoll District of Napa Valley AVA =

American Viticultural Area in Napa County, California

Coordinates: 38°19′57″N 122°26′44″W

Oak Knoll District of Napa Valley
- Wine region
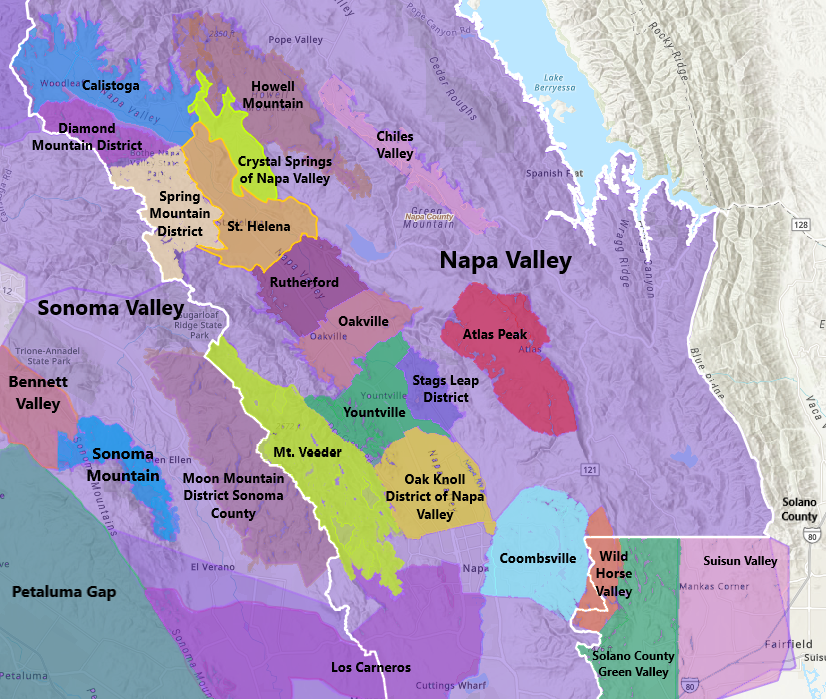
- Other names: OKD
- Type: American Viticultural Area
- Year established: 2004
- Years of wine industry: 146
- Country: United States
- Part of: California, Napa County, Napa Valley AVA
- Other regions in California, Napa County, Napa Valley AVA: Atlas Peak AVA, Calistoga AVA, Chiles Valley AVA, Diamond Mountain District AVA, Howell Mountain AVA, Los Carneros AVA, Mt. Veeder AVA, Coombsville AVA, Oakville AVA, Rutherford AVA, Spring Mountain District AVA, St. Helena AVA, Stags Leap District AVA, Wild Horse Valley AVA, Yountville AVA
- Growing season: 273 days
- Climate region: Region I-II
- Heat units: 2900 GDD units
- Precipitation (annual average): 28 to 30 in (710–760 mm)
- Soil conditions: Fine, gravelly clay, silt loam and loam
- Total area: 8,300 acres (13 sq mi)
- Size of planted vineyards: 4,200 acres (1,700 ha)
- No. of vineyards: 41
- Grapes produced: Cabernet Franc, Cabernet Sauvignon, Chardonnay, Malbec, Merlot, Pinot noir, Riesling, Syrah, Viognier, Zinfandel
- No. of wineries: 50

Oak Knoll District of Napa Valley is an American Viticultural Area (AVA) located within California’s renown landform Napa Valley. The wine appellation was established as the nation’s 151^{st}, the state’s 91^{st} and the county's sixteenth AVA on February 25, 2004 by the Alcohol and Tobacco Tax and Trade Bureau (TTB), Treasury after reviewing the petition submitted by the Oak Knoll District Committee proposing a viticultural area in the southern end of the Napa Valley in Napa County, California known as "Oak Knoll District."
The appellation is completely within the established Napa Valley viticultural area in close proximity to San Pablo Bay resulting in a climate that is cooler and more moderate than any region in Napa Valley other than the Los Carneros AVA. The AVA has more vines planted to it than any other wholly contained appellation within the Napa Valley. A wide variety of wine grapes do well in this climate, including varieties not widely grown in other parts of Napa Valley, such as Riesling and Pinot noir. The district is planted largely to Merlot, Chardonnay and Cabernet Sauvignon, in that order. Oak Knoll District Chardonnay has a reputation for a restrained, delicate style.

== History ==
The area now known as the Oak Knoll District was originally part of the Rancho Napa land grant, nearly 23,000 acres (36 sq mi) of land given to Salvador Vallejo in 1838 by Mexican Governor Juan Alvarado. Salvador Vallejo was the younger brother of General Mariano Vallejo and had served as the Captain of Militia at the Sonoma Mission. Rancho Napa bordered George C. Yount's Rancho Caymus to the north and Rancho Yajome to the east, on the other side of the Napa River.
George C. Yount brought viticulture to Napa from Sonoma in the dormant season of 1838-39 when he planted a few Mission variety vines at his place near today's town of Yountville. Simpson and William Thompson began their vine nursery south of Napa City in 1852. John Patchett probably produced Napa's first commercial wine from vines planted at Napa City in 1853. But the man responsible for bringing the first fine vinifera varieties, including Zinfandel, to the Napa Valley was Joseph W. Osborne, a New Englander who acquired an 800-acre (1.3 sq mi) plot of land in Rancho Napa, north of Napa City in 1851. He added to it and by 1856 had 1,100 acres (1.7 sq mi). As early as 1857, Osborne was already winning awards in the Bay Area for his wine made from "Foreign Grapes." He called his place Oak Knoll Ranch, a name which became renown in 1854, and again gained fame in 1856 when it was named California's best cultivated farm by the State Agricultural Society.
Because the area in the proposed Oak Knoll District was subsumed into a large and never precisely defined area called "Napa" or "Napa/Cameros" before Prohibition, it is difficult to gain a clear picture of the size of the winegrowing interest in the Oak Knoll area before the dry years. A Napa newspaper in 1881 counted 1,119 acres (453 ha) between Napa City and Yountville. So if Commissioner Charles Krug's 1881 figure of 585 acres (237 ha) for the Yountville area is correct, there were probably 400 to 600 acres (160–240 ha) in the Oak Knoll area west of the Napa River, a number considerably smaller than the 778 acres (315 ha) counted in the much smaller Browns Valley area. Since there were something like 9,000 to 11,000 acres (3,600–4,500 ha) of land in the Oak Knoll area as proposed by the current petition, not counting Browns Valley, it is clear that viticulture was not a particularly important activity here, with only about 5% of the land devoted to vineyards at the beginning of the 1880s. Krug calculated that between 1881 and 1887 the vineyards in the "Napa/Carnerosn" area grew by 165%. The vineyard land in the Yountville area grew by 186%. So it can logically be inferred that during the 1880s vineyard acreage in the Oak Knoll area grew considerably, but as a percentage of the total land devoted to agriculture there, the number was certainly quite small. It also follows that by examining fairly closely the two leading winegrowing operations in Oak Knoll in these years were more than simply a representative or symbolic activity. Despite this early recognition, viticulture was not the most important Oak Knoll agricultural activity during this time, with only around 5% of available land used for vineyards in the 1880's. Then, local wine production declined even further with the onset of Phylloxera in the late 1890's and Prohibition in 1920. Since the Repeal of Prohibition, numerous vineyards were planted in the area.
Oak Knoll's reputation was defined by two International events of telling importance in its viticulture history. Napa's Chateau Montelena Chardonnay won the top rating in the historic Paris Wine Tasting of 1976. Although the winery is located in Calistoga, the grapes were grown partially in the Oak Knoll District. This was followed by another tasting in June of 1979 when Gault-Millau magazine held the "World Wine Olympics" where the Trefethen Vineyards '76 Chardonnay was judged "best in the world" winning gold in the Chardonnay tasting. The Gallics were so disturbed that they challenged a rematch which took place in Burgundy on January 8, 1980. The result was another win for the Trefethen '76 Chardonnay besting the second place Puligny-Montrachet. A '75 Freemark Abbey Chardonnay took third place. Gault-Millau's "Le Nouveau Guide" later stated that "Nul ne voudrait mettre en cause la belle victoire du Trefethen Chardonnay (The fine victory of the Trefethen Chardonnay should not be questioned)." Oak Knoll District currently has over 4,150 acres (1,680 ha) under vine after designated as an American Viticultural Area in 2004.

== Terroir ==
=== Topography ===
According to reports cited by Dr. Elliott-Fisk, the Oak Knoll District of Napa Valley viticultural area lies at relatively low elevations along the valley floor, with the Dry Creek Fan spreading out across the valley floor as sea-level dropped and San Pablo Bay regressed south and west many years ago. Valley floor elevations and the valley floor gradient increase just south of Yountville. This is the most abrupt topographic change along the entire Napa Valley floor.

=== Climate ===
The petitioners state that, outside of the Los Carneros viticultural area, one of the coolest regions in the Napa Valley is the Oak Knoll District of Napa Valley viticultural area, which has a long cool growing season for grapevines lasting approximately eight months of the year. This uniform climate is due to the broad, flat valley floor’s topography. Along the western and eastern edges of the Oak Knoll District of Napa Valley area, small pockets of an even cooler climate are found in the immediate Napa River floodplain and in the small stream tributaries on the lower foothills. The petitioner also states the proximity of this area to San Pablo Bay results in a maritime influence, with cool breezes coming off the bay. Coastal fog is common is the mornings, especially in the summer. The petitioner adds that the area is sub-humid and receives approximately 28 to 30 in (710–760 mm) of precipitation in a normal year. Annual precipitation can reach 60 in (1,500 mm) in an abnormally wet year. The USDA plant hardiness zones are 9a and 9b.

=== Soil ===
According to the reports and studies cited by Dr. Elliott-Fisk, the soils in the Oak Knoll District of Napa Valley viticultural area are "more uniform than in other approved Napa Valley viticultural areas, due principally to the dominance of the large Dry Creek alluvial fan." Dr. Elliott-Fisk notes that across the large Dry Creek fan, soils include fine, gravelly clay loam, silt loam, and loam soils. The alluvial deposits from Dry Creek and the Napa River have buried the Diablo clays and Haire clay loams within this viticultural area. This contrasts with the land south of this viticultural area where Diablo and Haire soils are common at the surface. Bedrock, seen in the hillsides along the western edge of the Oak Knoll District of Napa Valley area is diverse and primarily volcanic in origin. Serpentine, sandstone and shale are found on the hillsides. The toeslope soils are unusually rich in clay and are found in many different colors.

== Vineyards and Wineries ==
- Behrens Family Vineyards
- Bengier Family Vineyards
- Blackbird Vineyards
- Fortunati Vineyards
- Monticello Vineyards/Corley Family
- Kelly Family Vineyards
- Lobos Wines
- O'Brien Estate
- Padis Vineyards
- Robert Biale Vineyards
- Trefethen Vineyards
- Whitehall Lane Winery & Vineyards
- Materra Cunat Family Vineyards
- O'Connell Family Wines
- Boyd Family Vineyards
- Mueller Vineyards
- Meadowbrook Vineyard
- Cliff Family Winery
