= Diamond Mountain District AVA =

Wine region in Napa Valley, California

Coordinates: 38°32′41″N 122°34′40″W

Diamond Mountain District
- Wine region
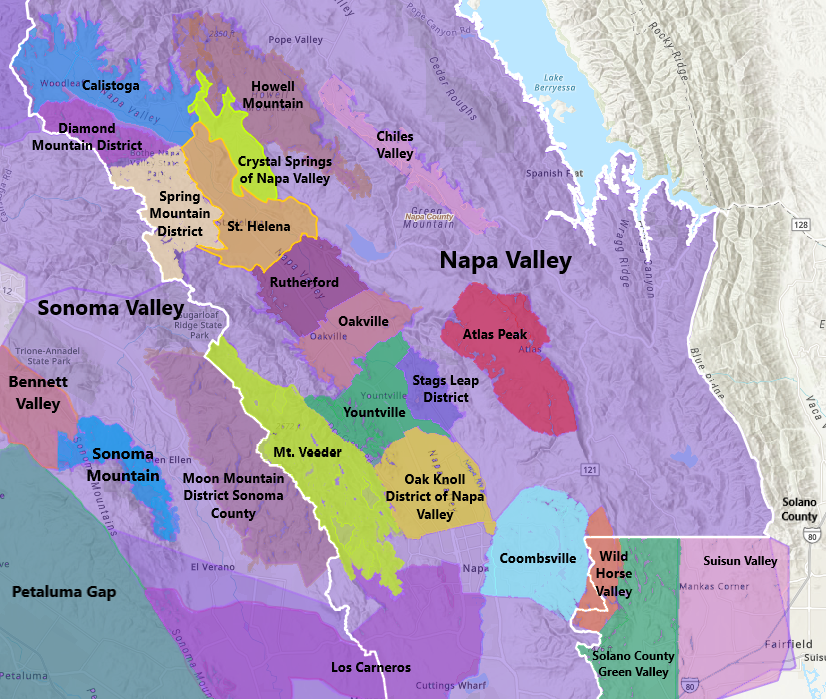
- Type: American Viticultural Area
- Year established: 2001
- Years of wine industry: 158
- Country: United States
- Part of: California, North Coast AVA, Napa County, Napa Valley AVA
- Other regions in California, North Coast AVA, Napa County, Napa Valley AVA: Los Carneros AVA, Howell Mountain AVA, Wild Horse Valley AVA, Stags Leap District AVA, Mt. Veeder AVA, Coombsville AVA Atlas Peak AVA, Spring Mountain District AVA, Oakville AVA, Rutherford AVA, St. Helena AVA, Chiles Valley AVA, Yountville AVA, Oak Knoll District of Napa Valley AVA, Calistoga AVA
- Growing season: 232 days
- Climate region: Region I-II
- Heat units: 2,018-2,894 GDD units
- Precipitation (annual average): 55 inches (1,397 mm)
- Soil conditions: Residual upland soils derived from volcanic parent material
- Total area: 5,000 acres (8 sq mi)
- Size of planted vineyards: 500 acres (202 ha)
- No. of vineyards: 41
- Grapes produced: Cabernet Franc, Cabernet Sauvignon, Malbec, Merlot, Petit Verdot, Sauvignon Blanc
- No. of wineries: 47

Diamond Mountain District is an American Viticultural Area (AVA) located in Napa County California in the northwest portion of the Napa Valley landform and appellation. It was established as the nation's 145^{th}, the state's 87^{th} and the county's fifteenth AVA on June 1, 2001 by the Bureau of Alcohol, Tobacco and Firearms (ATF), Treasury after reviewing the petition submitted by Rudy von Strasser of Von Strasser Winery, on behalf of the Diamond Mountain Appellation Committee, representing 15 growers and vintners proposing a viticultural area in Napa Valley named "Diamond Mountain."

The AVA boundaries are defined by the Napa-Sonoma county line to the west, Petrified Forest to the north, the 400-foot (122 m) line of altitude running parallel to Route 29 on the east, and the Spring Mountain District to the south. This places the southern part of the city of Calistoga in the appellation, with the northern part located in the Calistoga AVA since 2010. The appellation sits at a higher elevation than most of Napa Valley's wine region, resulting in less cool fog coming in from San Pablo Bay, and more direct exposure to sunlight. The soil is also very porous which allows it to cool down quickly despite the increased sunlight.

== Name Change ==
When the appellation was proposed in 1999, the request for public comments was published in the Federal Register. Though commenters maintained that because the name "Diamond Mountain" was always associated with Napa Valley, Fred and Mary Constant of Diamond Mountain Vineyard, one of the oldest and highest located 2,200 feet (671 m) above sea level near the mountaintop, submitted comments proposing two changes to the viticultural area. The Constants owed the trademark for the name "Diamond Mountain Vineyard," and proposed the name "Diamond Mountain District" would reduce confusion and conflicts with their trademark, their winery name, and other Diamond Mountain trademarks. As evidence for the use of this name, the Constants submitted two documents in which "District" is used in association with "Diamond Mountain." One, a 1913 school board document, twice referred to the Diamond Mountain school district. The other, an article from the December 4, 1999 issue of the Wine Business Insider periodical on the proposed Diamond Mountain viticultural area, used the phrase "Diamond Mountain District." The Constants also proposed amending the southwestern boundary of the viticultural area to include their Sonoma County property. Their property, Diamond Mountain Vineyard, straddles the Napa and Sonoma county line. Seventy acres (28 ha) are located in Napa County within the Diamond Mountain viticultural area boundaries while 15 acres (6 ha) are in Sonoma county just outside the proposed boundaries. The Constants argued that their Sonoma property is on Diamond Mountain and should therefore be included in any viticultural area bearing its name. Referring to the U.S.G.S. map submitted by the petitioners, they pointed out that much of taken as a whole, the historic and current evidence regarding the boundaries supports the original boundaries proposed by the petitioners. No evidence was present that associated Sonoma County or the Constants' Sonoma vineyard with the grape growing area known as "Diamond Mountain." In conclusion, ATF's ruling was that "Diamond Mountain District" is locally and nationally known referring to that part of Diamond Mountain in Napa County. This, along with the petitioners' climate and soil evidence, supported designating only the Napa County part of Diamond Mountain as the viticultural area, "Diamond Mountain District."

== History ==
Diamond Mountain District's history as a winegrowing region dates back to 1868, when the first vines were planted by Jacob Schram on a tract of land he purchased on the Napa side of the mountain. He had previously worked as a barber in White Sulphur Springs and Napa City before moving to Diamond Mountain for his health. Schram and his wife went into the fields themselves and planted a small section of grapevines. By 1892, his holdings had expanded to 100 acres (40 ha), including underground cellars for aging and storing wine. From these humble beginning, "Schramsberger" wine went on to become one of the most recognizable brands in the world. To this day Schramsberg winery still bears his name and continued in the property, now known as Schramsberg Vineyards

Fred and Mary Constant's Diamond Mountain Vineyard, located on the mountaintop, is one of the oldest and highest in Napa County, dating back to the late 1890s when Danish-born Andrew Rasmussen, the superintendent of the Greystone Winery in St. Helena, currently the Culinary Institute of America, planted 40 acres (16 ha) of vines at the crest of the mountain. By the time AVA status was being sought, the Constant vineyard had expanded to 70 acres (28 ha), 15 of which lie on the Sonoma side of the county line. The evolution of Diamond Mountain into a Napa Valley regional name began in the early decades of the 20th century, with Diamond Mountain School and Diamond Mountain Road being the first features in the region to bear the name. The naming of the school took place in 1909, with the major access road in the region designed as Diamond Mountain Road shortly thereafter. The petitioner has also presented substantial evidence that the Diamond Mountain region began to gain national renown in the early 1970's, as expanding consumer interest in California wines resulted in new vineyards, new wineries and a greater awareness of regional wine character. As evidence for this national name the petitioner includes an excerpt from the second edition of The Wines of America by Leon Adams that states, "Diamond Mountain, like Mt. Veeder and Spring Mountain also on the west side of Napa Valley, is regarded as a viticultural district separate from the rest of Napa Valley."

== Terroir ==
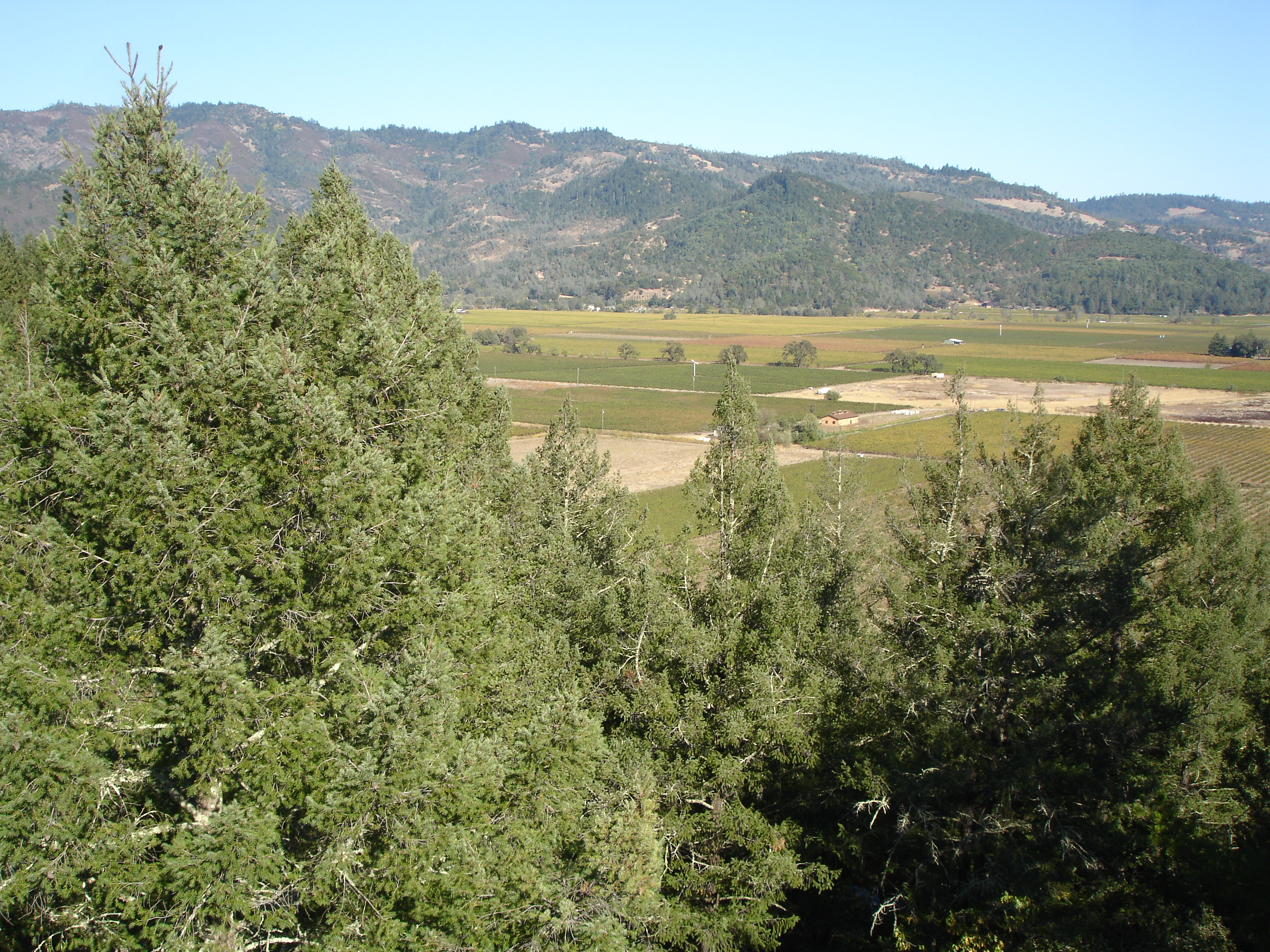
District view of the valley below

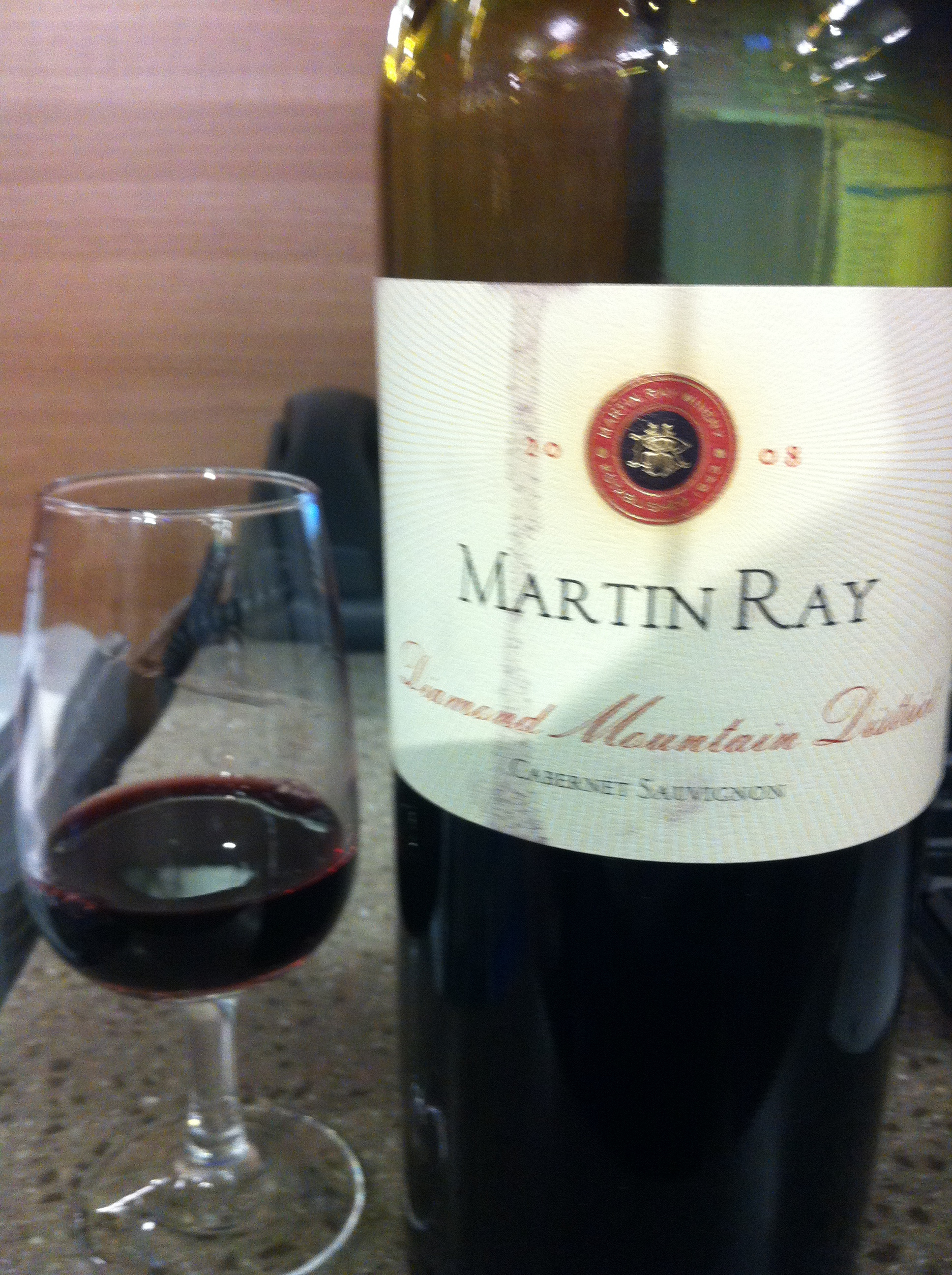
District Cabernet Sauvignon

=== Topography ===
The viticultural area's topography and aspect contribute to a special microclimate. The entire AVA sits between 400 to 2,000 feet (122–610 m) above sea level, which helps to cool it compared to the nearby valley floor appellations. The AVA is defined by the Napa-Sonoma county line on the west, Petrified Forest Road on the north, the 400-foot (122 m) line of altitude running parallel to Route 29 on the east, and the Spring Mountain District to the south. This puts the southern part of the city of Calistoga, California in the appellation, with the northern part lying in the Calistoga AVA since 2010.

=== Climate ===
Hillside topography and valley temperature inversions combine to give the region an unusually moderate temperate regime during a growing season, with lower maximum temperatures and higher minimum temperatures than nearby locations on the floor of the Napa Valley. The petitioner states that the microclimate of the Diamond Mountain region is clearly distinctive when compared to the surrounding areas. The region's microclimate is slightly warmer than that of the Spring Mountain District to the south, but somewhat similar due to comparable upland locations, northeastern (eastern, in Spring Mountain's case) aspects, and cooling influence of marine breezes from the Pacific Ocean. The microclimate is significantly cooler than the floor of the Napa Valley to its northeast and north, due to various tempering influences primarily associated with its upland location. So too is it cooler than adjacent land to the west in Sonoma County, due to its predominantly northeastern aspect which provides oblique sun and shade in the afternoon, while the western aspect of the Mayacamas Mountains adjacent to the region in Sonoma County is clearly hotter and drier. The USDA plant hardiness zone range is 9a to 10a.

=== Soils ===
The fine-grained, ash-like soils of the Diamond Mountain District contains shards of reflective volcanic glass and obsidian that sparkles giving the area its name. The region consists entirely of residual upland soils derived from volcanic parent material. These soils are very different from the alluvial soils on the floor of the Napa Valley to the east and northeast and are also significantly different from the sedimentary upland soils prevalent in the Spring Mountain viticultural area to the south. These soils are significantly different from the shallow, dry soils in Sonoma County to the west and southwest.

== Viticulture ==
Since the Schramsberg Vineyards were established in the 1860s by Jack Schram, Diamond Mountain's history as a winegrowing region consistently grew with Diamond Mountain Vineyard, located on the mountaintop, was established in the 1890s by Danish-born Andrew Rasmussen. After Prohibition and the Great Depression severely hampered Napa County viticulture, it was a century later, pioneer vintner Al Brounstein grew Diamond Creek Vineyards in 1968 establishing California's first exclusive Cabernet Sauvignon Estate Vineyard serving as a template for Napa Valley as prime territory for the varietal.
