= Calistoga AVA =

Wine grape–growing region in California, US

Coordinates: 38°34′14″N 122°33′15″W

Calistoga
- Wine region
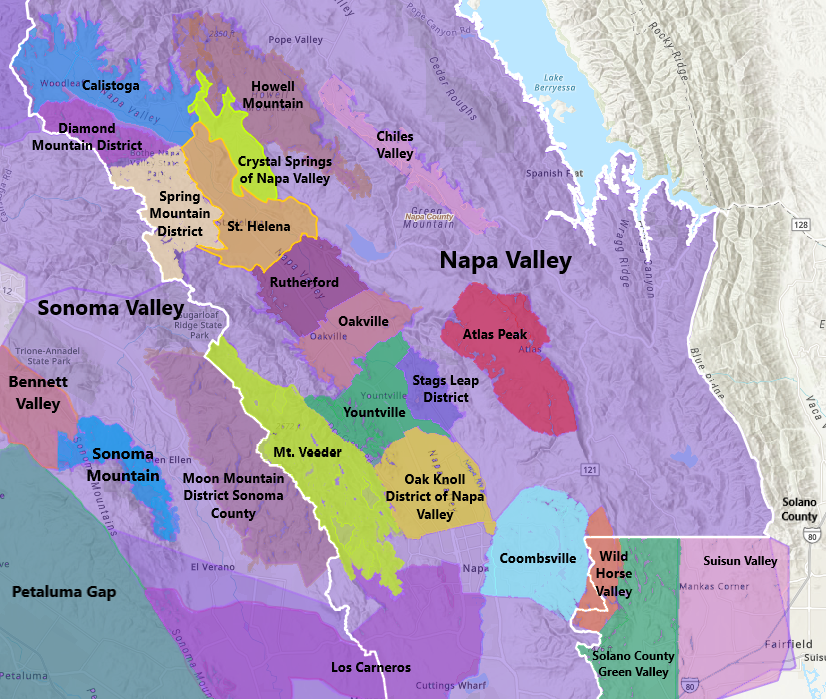
- Napa Valley AVAs
- Type: American Viticultural Area
- Year established: 2009; 2024 Amend
- Years of wine industry: 164
- Country: United States
- Part of: California, North Coast AVA, Napa County, Napa Valley AVA
- Other regions in California, North Coast AVA, Napa County, Napa Valley AVA: Atlas Peak AVA, Chiles Valley AVA, Coombsville AVA, Crystal Springs of Napa Valley AVA, Diamond Mountain District AVA, Howell Mountain AVA, Los Carneros AVA, Mt. Veeder AVA, Oak Knoll District of Napa Valley AVA, Oakville AVA, Rutherford AVA, Spring Mountain District AVA, St. Helena AVA, Stags Leap District AVA, Wild Horse Valley AVA, Yountville AVA
- Growing season: 232 days
- Climate region: Region III
- Heat units: 3,340 GDD units
- Precipitation (annual average): 22 to 50 inches (559–1,270 mm)
- Soil conditions: Gravelly, stony or cobbly loams, and clay-silt loams underlain with volcanic bedrock
- Total area: 4,480 acres (7 sq mi)
- Size of planted vineyards: 2,500 acres (1,012 ha)
- No. of vineyards: 7
- Grapes produced: Cabernet Franc, Cabernet Sauvignon, Merlot, Petite Syrah, Sauvignon Blanc, Zinfandel
- No. of wineries: 55

Calistoga (/kæ.l.ɪstˈoʊɡə/ ka-list-ohguh) is an American Viticultural Area (AVA) located in the northwestern portion of Napa County, California, within the Napa Valley appellation surrounding the locale of Calistoga. It was established as the nation's 196th, the state's 55th and the county's seventeenth appellation on December 8, 2009 by the Alcohol and Tobacco Tax and Trade Bureau (TTB), Treasury after reviewing the petition submitted in 2003, by James P. "Bo" Barrett of Chateau Montelena Winery and Vineyard, on behalf of the Calistoga viticulture community, proposing a viticultural area in Napa Valley to be known as "Calistoga".

The name Calistoga dates back to 1857, with the first vine plantings in 1862. Viticultural and winery census data from 1880 lists Calistoga as a distinct region separate from Napa. Despite sharing the name, Calistoga appellation does not encompass the entirety of the town. The area is noted for its topographical diversity and uniform geology, with bedrock almost exclusively made through volcanic action. The hot days provide color and flavor in the wines, while the cool nights help to maintain acidity and structure The appellation abuts the Diamond Mountain District to the south and west, the St. Helena to the southeast, and the Howell Mountain is a short way to the east. The appellation is distinguished by its volcanic soil, high temperatures up to 100 °F (38 °C) during the day, and cool nights during the growing season due to breezes from the Russian River, causing the highest diurnal temperature variation in the Napa Valley up to 50 °F (28 °C).

In 2024, the Crystal Springs of Napa Valley appellation was established adjacent to Calistoga AVA's southeastern boundary. During the comment period, a vineyard was noted as split between the proposed AVA and the established Calistoga. The vineyard, known as the Crystal Springs Vineyard, sat along North Fork of Crystal Springs Road between the northwestern portion of the proposed AVA and the eastern portion of the Calistoga AVA. Approximately 11 acres (4 ha) of the vineyard lay within the Calistoga boundary, and the remaining 6 acres (2 ha) within the proposed Crystal Springs. As requested, TTB ruled on modifying the boundary of the established Calistoga AVA placing the vineyard entirely within the Crystal Springs AVA.

== Controversy ==
When the appellation was submitted, two wineries, Calistoga Cellars and Calistoga Estate, fought against the proposal, as under U.S. wine law they would either have to use 85% grapes from the new AVA (neither did at the time) or change their brand names. Several compromises were proposed, and ultimately rejected, before the AVA was approved. During the process, the TTB, the current federal body in charge of AVA designations, paused the process of all AVA proposals due to the need to redefine regulations. Ultimately, the wineries using the Calistoga name were given three years to come in compliance with the appellation rules or discontinue using the name.

== Name history ==
The petitioner submitted the following as evidence that the proposed viticultural area described in the petition is locally and nationally known as "Calistoga":

- Samuel Brannan was the leader of a Mormon settlement expedition on the ship Brooklyn landing in Yerba Buena (San Francisco) in 1846. Following the discovery of gold in Coloma, Brannan became California's first millionaire. Fascinated after visiting the hot springs in the upper Napa Valley in 1852, Brannan purchased more than 2,000 acres (3 sq mi) in the northern portion of Rancho Carne Humana in 1857 with the intent to develop a spa reminiscent of the then-fashionable Saratoga Springs in New York. He founded the town of Calistoga, so named in the fall of 1867, by Brannan, who was reported and quoted as saying that the name came from his slip of the tongue that transformed "Saratoga of California" into "Calistoga of Sarafornia". Brannan also founded the Napa Valley Railroad in 1864 in order to provide tourists with an easier way to reach Calistoga from the San Francisco Bay ferry boats that docked in the lower Napa Valley on the shores of San Pablo Bay at Vallejo. Meanwhile, the vine planting fever struck the Valley and Brannan had already been infected. On his 1860 trip to France he had bought 20,000 cuttings and now set them out in his nursery near Calistoga. He bought a huge tract of land here in 1862 from J. S. Berryessa and the vine planting began. A map of Napa wineries in 1893 shows significant clustering of wineries near Calistoga distinctly separate from the surrounding areas.
- An 1881 book, History of Napa and Lake Counties, shows three Napa County viticultural districts: Calistoga, St. Helena and Napa.
- In his 1973 book The Wines of America, Leon Adams separates Calistoga as a specific viticultural area.
- In the 1983 Modern Encyclopedia of Wine, British writer Hugh Johnson significantly includes Calistoga in a listing of "unofficially recognized appellations or sub areas". Calistoga is shown with equal status to most of the sub-areas. (10 of the 12 defined sub-areas have now been made AVAs.
- The German book Wine by André Dominé recognizes Calistoga as one of "The Valley's Three Zones". He further elaborates and describes 20 separate sub-AVAs in Napa. In Domine's listing of the most important sub-AVAs in the Napa Valley, Calistoga is listed equally with all the other TTB-approved AVAs. All the other listings on the page herein provided are in fact TTB-approved AVAs.
- James Laube, in his 1989 book California's Great Cabernets, describes "a "commune" system within the Napa Valley is utilized to differentiate where grapes are grown within the valley as well as to analyze regional styles of wine." In this list Calistoga is included on equal status and recognition as the other nine "communes". 9 of the 10 "communes" are now approved AVAs, Calistoga is nationally known and recognized as a viticultural area.
- In Wine Atlas of California, the Australian writer James Halliday definitively covers the Calistoga area that the chapter in his book could provide most of the evidential requirements for this entire petition. Halliday's work is referenced in more than one section of this petition. His table of Contents shows Calistoga equal recognition to 7 approved AVAs, and more distinct than the approved mountain AVAs, which are combined.
- A brief summary of Calistoga's Wine History by Calistoga Winery proprietor Jim Summers, which, the petitioner states, "includes a more historical perspective in the long recognition of Calistoga as a viticultural area."

== Terroir ==
=== Geography and soils ===
The petition included, as evidence of the Calistoga viticultural area's unique growing conditions, a report written by Jonathan Swinchatt, PhD, of EarthVision, Inc. Swinchatt's report indicated that the proposed Calistoga viticultural area is distinguished from surrounding areas by its geographic and geologic features. Swinchatt explained:

The entirety of the proposed viticultural area is underlain by volcanic bedrock, part of the more widespread Sonoma Volcanics that occur in the Vaca Mountains, in the northern Mayacamas Mountains, bordering the lower slopes of the southern Mayacamas Mountains, and in Sonoma County. All the rock materials in the proposed viticultural area—bedrock and sediments—are part of, or derived from, the Sonoma Volcanics. These rocks comprise lava flows, ash-fall tuffs, welded tuffs, pyroclastic flows, mudflows, and ignimbrites. Their composition is largely andesitic with some rhyolitic rocks admixed. AVAs [American Viticultural Areas] farther to the south—St. Helena, Rutherford, and Oakville, in particular—exhibit significantly greater geologic diversity across their width, being underlain primarily by marine sedimentary rocks on the west side of the valley but by volcanic rocks on the east. In addition, these AVAs contain alluvial fan environments on their edges, and fluvial (river) environments in their more central parts. The proposed Calistoga AVA is topographically more diverse but geologically more uniform than these other AVAs that include valley floor environments. The mineralogy and chemistry of the substrate throughout the proposed viticultural area reflects the common source of the granular materials in the Sonoma Volcanics. In the mountains, vineyards are planted in colluvium-sedimentary particles that have been transformed from the parent bedrock through weathering processes and have accumulated either in place or moved only a short distance. The upland soils are dominantly excessively drained, gravelly loams, very stony loams, and loams, on steep slopes. Most of the breakdown products of weathering have been transported by streams into the valley; much of the finer material has been transported from the area by the Napa River, leaving coarser sediments behind throughout much of the proposed viticultural area. Alluvial fans have formed at the mouths of most of the drainages, particularly along the northeast side of the valley at Dutch Henry Canyon, Simmons Canyon, Jericho Canyon, and north of Tubbs Lane at the headwaters of the Napa River in Kimball Canyon. At all these locations, cobbly and gravelly loams extend well out onto the valley floor, mixed here and there with finer-grained sediments. On the southwest side, small fans occur at the mouths of Diamond Creek, Nash Creek, and Ritchie Creek. These locations are characterized by cobbly and gravelly loams. Coarse sediments characterize the valley floor throughout the extent of the proposed viticultural area, the finer-grained materials having been transported out of the region by the waters of the Napa River. Soils throughout the proposed viticultural area are loams, gravelly loams, cobbly loams, often with boulders, some with admixtures of silt and clay—clay-rich soils are of limited distribution. These sediments are well drained, with admixtures of clay providing water-holding capacity. Further south in the Napa Valley, gravelly loams and loams are characteristic only of the upper reaches of the alluvial fans that line the valley, while the valley center is often covered by much finer, clay-rich, material.

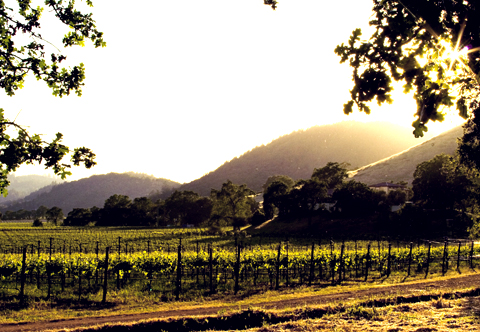
Chateau Montelena vineyard

=== Climate ===
In addition to the unique geographic and geologic features of the Calistoga viticultural area, Swinchatt's report indicated that its unique climatic features further distinguish the Calistoga viticultural area from surrounding areas. Swinchatt explained:

Climatic information in our report for the Napa Valley Vintners' Association is based on data from DAYMET.org, a website that provides climatic information throughout the United States. DAYMET data is based on a computer algorithm that allows the extension of data from scattered weather stations into areas of complex topography. The algorithm was tested over 154,441 square miles (400,000 km^{2}) in Washington State and found to be accurate within 1.2 degrees centigrade for temperature prediction and to be able to predict rainfall with an 83 percent accuracy. Heat summation in degree days, defined as the total number of hours above 50 °F (10 °C), is the accepted general measure of temperature and solar insolation in the wine industry. While heat summation is only a general indicator of regional temperature, it provides a more useful view than the limited temperature data from one or two available weather stations. Temperature, climate in general, can vary over distances of a few hundred feet or less, so that temperature measurements at one or two locations mean little within a regional context. Under these conditions, DAYMET heat summation data provides as good a measure of regional conditions as is available.

Examination of DAYMET data indicates that most of the proposed viticultural area—mountain slopes and valley floor alike, lies within Region III, defined as the range of 3,000 to 3,500 degree days. Only a small area of the valley floor in the proposed viticultural district, east of the restriction in the valley formed by the ridge just west of the mouth of Dutch Henry Creek—lies within low Region IV. The difference is well within the limits of accuracy of the data, indicating that the entire proposed viticultural area has a similar temperature profile. Farther south, valley floor vineyards are exposed to significantly different temperature conditions than those in the hills; in the Calistoga region, valley floor and hills appear to be part of a single climatic regime. This regime is characterized by hot days and cool nights, conditions ideal for a combination of ripening grapes but maintaining good acid balance. One of the long-standing climatic assumptions in the Napa Valley is that Calistoga has the highest temperatures of any location within the valley. Temperature data and anecdotal evidence, however, dispute this assumption, both indicating that the hottest part of the valley is a small region just west closer of Bale Lane. Hottest average temperatures in August (over the 18 year period from 1980 ton 1997) occur from Stags Leap District to south of Dutch Henry Canyon, along the base of the Vaca Mountains. The Calistoga AVA is cooled by air currents drawn in from the Russian River through the northwestern corner of the mountain heights. These are drawn in to replace hot air rising from the valley, currents that used to support sailplanes headquartered at the Calistoga Gliderport. In addition, cooling breezes flow down the slopes of both the Vaca and Mayacamas Mountains in the later afternoon. Daytime peak temperatures reach about 100 °F (38 °C) at mid-day. The heated air rises by convection, drawing in cooler air form the Russian River, the breezes continuing after sunset, cooling the valley floor to about 65 °F (18 °C). Further cooling occurs, on fog free nights, driven by cool air moving down slope from the mountains providing additional cooling of 12 to 15 °F (−11 to −9 °C). Minimum nighttime temperatures often average about 50 °F (10 °C), giving a diurnal temperature range that sometimes is greater than 50 °F (10 °C). Vintners in the proposed viticultural areas hold that this large diurnal variation is one of the main influences on the character of wines from the region. The hot daytime temperatures provide color and big berry fruit, while the cool nights provide good acid balance for structure and develop power in the wines. The character of wines in the southeastern-most corner of the proposed viticultural district, south of the "Sterling Hill" between Maple and Dunaweal Lanes is somewhat softer due to higher nighttime temperatures. In its southern and central portions, the Napa Valley trends northwest-southeast, with slopes facing mainly northeast and southwest, modified by the drainages that cut the slopes that add diversity to the aspect presented by vineyards to the sun. In its northern portions, however, the trend of the valley is closer to west-east, with the major slopes facing just east of north (in the Mayacamas Mountains) and just west of south (in the Vaca Mountains). A slope aspect map indicates also that the valley floor has very little flat ground, most of it reflects the slopes of alluvial fans, gentle on the north (such as at Dutch Henry Canyon) and steeper on the south. Slope aspect and exposure to the sun in the Calistoga region thus is quite distinct from that in any other AVA within the Napa Valley region. Rainfall in the Calistoga region is typically higher than elsewhere in the area, with the highest rainfall recorded just outside the northern perimeter of the proposed viticultural area, on Mount Saint Helena.
Precipitation is highest in the mountains, up to 60-plus inches (1,524 mm) per year, and lowest in the valley, but year-to-year variation is large, as it is elsewhere in the Napa Valley region. DAYMET data for the years 1990 to 1997 indicate that precipitation ranged from just over 20 inches (508 mm) to over 55 inches (1,397 mm) on the valley floor, and from about 25 inches (635 mm) to over 65 inches (1,651 mm) in the surrounding mountains. Measures of average rainfall thus have little meaning. The plant hardiness zone ranges from 9a to 10a.

== See also ==
- California wine
- Geography of California
- Napa Valley Wine Train
