= Howell Mountain AVA =

Appellation that designates wine in Napa County, California

Coordinates: 38°36′01″N 122°27′37″W

Howell Mountain
- Wine region
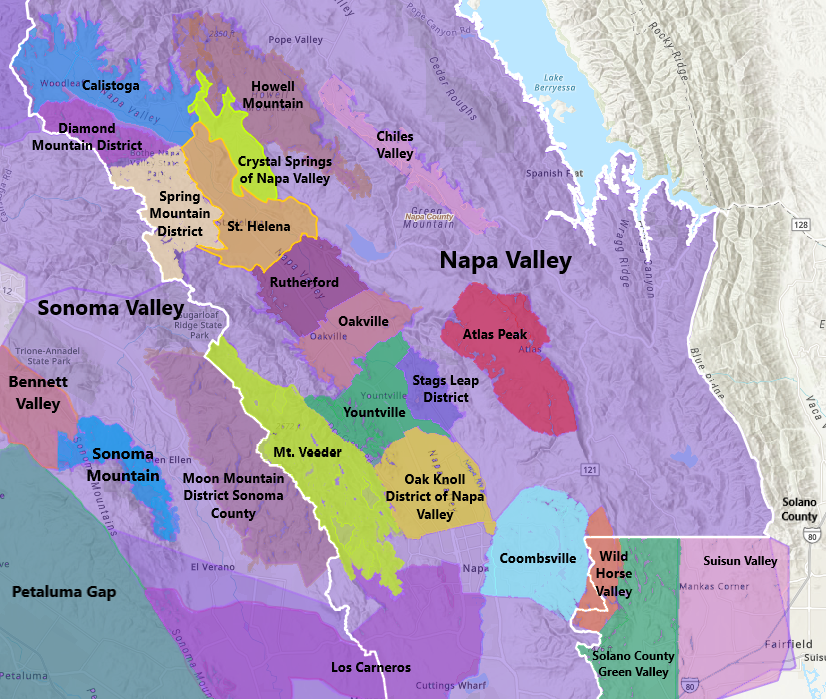
- Type: American Viticultural Area
- Year established: 1983; 1987 Amended
- Years of wine industry: 149
- Country: United States
- Part of: California, Napa County, Napa Valley AVA
- Other regions in California, Napa County, Napa Valley AVA: Atlas Peak AVA, Calistoga AVA, Chiles Valley AVA, Diamond Mountain District AVA, Los Carneros AVA, Mt. Veeder AVA, Coombsville AVA, Oak Knoll District of Napa Valley AVA, Oakville AVA, Rutherford AVA, Spring Mountain District AVA, St. Helena AVA, Stags Leap District AVA, Wild Horse Valley AVA, Yountville AVA
- Growing season: 222 days
- Climate region: Region Ib-III
- Heat units: 2022.5-3182 GDD units
- Precipitation (annual average): 40.74 inches (1,034.80 mm)
- Soil conditions: Aiken and Forward Group
- Total area: 14,080 acres (22 sq mi)
- Size of planted vineyards: 600 acres (243 ha)
- Varietals produced: Cabernet Franc, Cabernet Sauvignon, Chardonnay, Grenache, Malbec, Merlot, Petit Verdot, Petite Sirah, Sauvignon blanc, Zinfandel

Howell Mountain is an American Viticultural Area (AVA) located in Napa County, California and the second sub-appellation within the internationally acclaimed Napa Valley. The 14,080-acre (22 sq mi) region was established as the nation's 56th, the state's 36th and the county's fourth appellation on December 30, 1983 by the Bureau of Alcohol, Tobacco and Firearms (ATF), Treasury after reviewing the petition submitted by members of the grape-growing and wine-producing industries in the area proposing a viticultural area within Napa Valley known as "Howell Mountain."

The area is locally and nationally known by its name located in the Howell Mountains within the Vaca Range on the northeast side of valley around the town of Angwin and overlooking the city of St. Helena. The boundaries of the appellation are dictated by vineyards located at elevations at and above 1,400 feet (430 m). It possesses geographical features, climate, soil, elevation, physical features, etc., which distinguish its viticultural features from surrounding areas.

== History ==
Among the early vineyards established in the Howell Mountain region was by two experienced French winemakers, Brun and Chaix, in 1877. They started a successful wine enterprise contributing to the industry boom in the 1880s. Their winery had a capacity of 150,000 US gal (567,812 L). The most famous vintner to move to Howell Mountain in the 1880s was Charles Krug who planted about 100 acres (40 ha) there by 1884. Vineyards on Howell Mountain developed an excellent reputation for their wines by the end of the decade and the J. Thomas Winery in St. Helena was producing 25,000 US gal (94,635 L) sourced from Howell Mountain grapes in 1889. The man who made Howell Mountain wines world renowned was W. S. Keyes, son of General E.D. Keyes, who set out his Lapairita Vineyards in 1880 and later built a stone winery that still stands on Los Posadas Road. By 1891, he had 600–700 acres (243–283 ha) of wine grapes on "the Mountain." He made excellent wines and entered two vintages in the 1899 Paris Exposition winning gold and bronze medals for a claret and a Blanco, respectively. Keyes repeated his Paris triumph at the 1904 St. Louis Exposition with the claret winning the grand prize. Keyes' victories was widely carried in the California press as the Howell Mountain claret established a long-standing reputation for Howell Mountain red wines especially its Zinfandel. Prohibition effectively ended wine production in the United States and the market for Howell Mountain's superior wines collapsed and its vineyards were either abandoned or ripped out. Although Prohibition ended with the Repeal in 1933, the damage was already done and efforts to revive the few remaining vineyards did not last. In the 1960s, the second wine revolution began in California and several old properties had been purchased by pioneering vintners interested in revitalizing and reestablishing the Howell Mountain reputation for premium wines. Zinfandel and Cabernet Sauvignon became the dominant grape variety which was no surprise to those who knew the literature of California wine history three quarters of a century earlier. Bottled Zinfandel under the Howell Mountain designation was a symbolic reunion of the ties established by the 1900 Paris victories by the Keyes winery.

== Terroir ==
=== Topography ===
The area is defined by its elevations where vineyards in Howell Mountain lie between 1,400 and 2,200 feet (427–671 m) well above the fog level in Napa Valley which is most affected by the cool fog and winds from San Pablo Bay while Howell Mountain, at the same time, is exposed to sunlight receiving larger amounts of solar radiation. The mountain does get cool breezes directly from the Pacific Ocean, and the relatively high elevations result in a cooler climate than on the valley floor.

=== Climate ===
Howell Mountain is characterized by moderate temperatures, with an average mean temperature of 56.80 °F (13.8 °C), compared to an average mean temperature of 58.60 °F (14.8 °C) at St. Helena (to the southwest) and 59 °F (15 °C) in Pope Valley (to the northeast). The average yearly rainfall for Howell Mountain is 40.74 in (1,035 mm), compared to 32.1 in (815 mm) for Pope Valley and 35.4 in (899 mm) for Napa Valley (St. Helena). Several days of the year the valley floor is covered with fog while Howell Mountain is at the same time exposed to sunlight. The USDA plant hardiness zone is 9b.

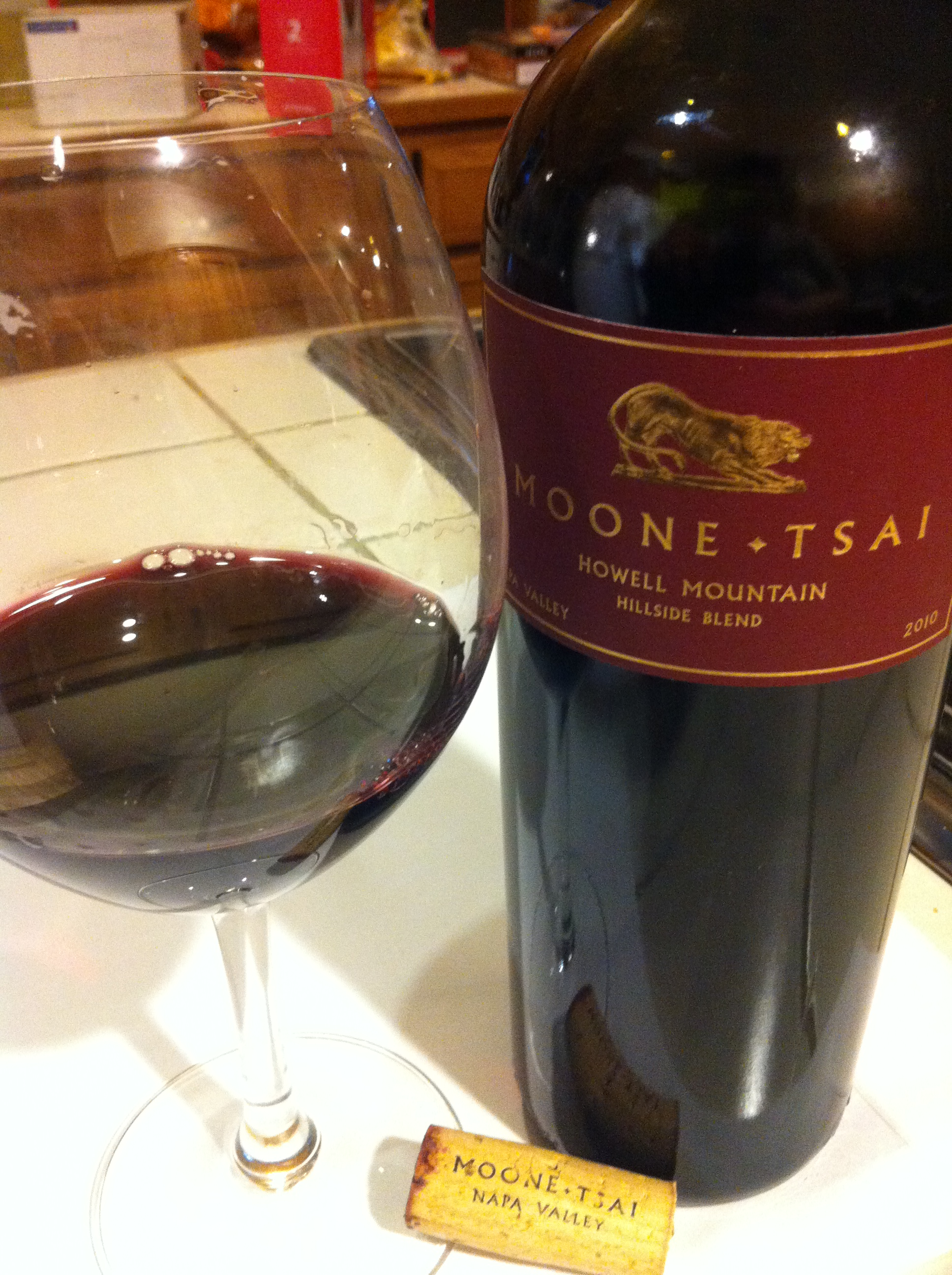
Howell Mountain Hillside Blend

=== Soils ===
The soil in the appellation is volcanic with excellent drainage. The soils in the area are for the most part in the Aiken and Forward Group. These soil types are not commonly found in the vineyards of the Napa Valley floor. The vineyard soils in the Angwin area are for the most part in the Aiken and Forward group and these soil types are not commonly found in the vineyards of the valley. The altitude and long-day exposure to the sun of the vineyards is also different than those on the valley floor.

== Viticulture ==
The Howell Mountain AVA petition was predominantly done by Bill Smith formerly of La Jota and later W. H. Smith Wines. In a petition exhibit, Keith W. Bowers, Cooperative Extension Grape Farm Advisor in Napa County, University of California wrote, "Angwin is without question a unique subarea within the Napa Valley appellation. Historically the grapes from this area have been recognized by winemakers, as being of superior quality. From my own Angwin vineyard, the grapes I sold in the 1960s received a premium payment over the same varieties grown on the valley floor. Grapes from Angwin have been purchased by Krug, Martini, Heitz and others because they are known to be of high quality."
