= Napa County wine =

Appellation that designates wine in Napa County, CA

Napa County
- Wine region
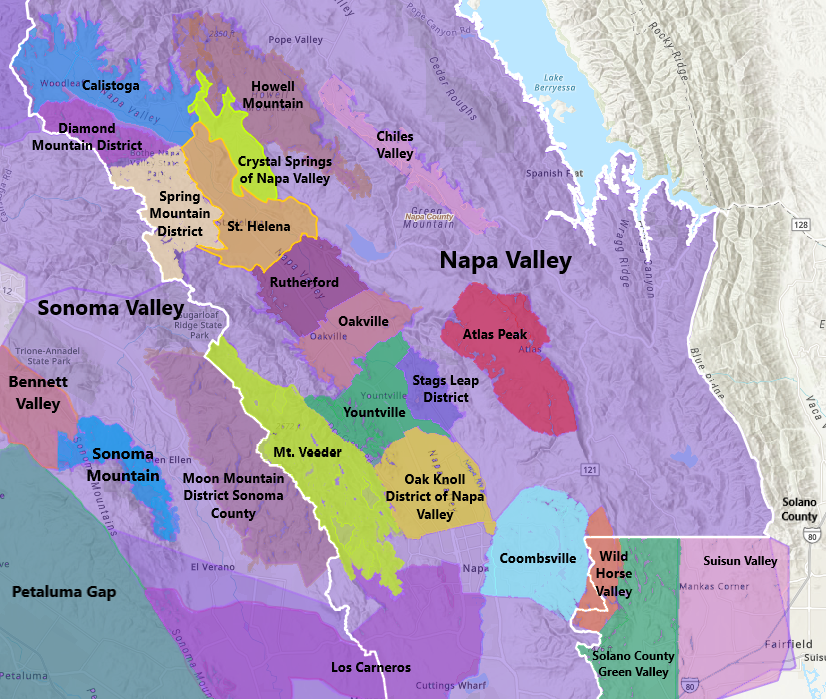
- Type: U.S. County Appellation
- Year established: 1850
- Years of wine industry: 187
- Country: United States
- Part of: California, North Coast AVA
- Other regions in California, North Coast AVA: Sonoma County, Mendocino County, Lake County
- Sub-regions: Atlas Peak AVA, Chiles Valley AVA, Crystal Springs of Napa Valley AVA, Diamond Mountain District AVA, Howell Mountain AVA, Los Carneros AVA, Mt. Veeder AVA, Napa Valley AVA, Oak Knoll District of Napa Valley AVA, Oakville AVA, Rutherford AVA, Spring Mountain District AVA, St. Helena AVA, Stags Leap District AVA, Wild Horse Valley AVA, Yountville AVA
- Total area: 748 square miles (478,720 acres)
- Size of planted vineyards: 45,275 acres (18,322 ha)
- Grapes produced: Cabernet Sauvignon, Merlot, Cabernet Franc, Pinot noir, Zinfandel, Chardonnay, Sauvignon blanc

Napa County, California, United States, is a center of viticulture and winemaking. The vast majority of Napa County's 45,275 acres (18,322 ha) cultivated land is within the boundaries of the world-famous Napa Valley American Viticultural Area (AVA) and its numerous sub-appellations. The portion of the county that falls outside of the boundaries of the Napa Valley AVA is northeast of the Chiles Valley AVA, where few grapes are cultivated.

Few wines are produced that carry a Napa County appellation of origin designation, as almost every wine produced from grapes grown in the county is eligible for release with the more commercially profitable Napa Valley AVA designation. The most common use of Napa County on a wine label is when a wine has been produced from grapes grown in two or more counties, such as Sonoma County and Napa County. In such a case, the wine label must indicate what percentage of grapes were sourced from each county.

== History ==
=== Early history ===
The Napa County wine industry began when George Yount, of Sonoma County, grew the first wine grapes in Napa Valley in the mid-nineteenth century. Although he is credited with starting the wine industry, Yount did not grow the industry, and it was not until Charles Krug arrived in Napa that the industry began to explode. In 1858, Charles Krug began producing wine in Napa with vintner John Patchett's grapes. Three years later, in 1861, Krug founded Charles Krug winery (Napa County's first commercial winery), which still exists today, and with the guidance of winemakers Agoston Haraszthy and John Patchett along with Patchett's grapes, Charles Krug began to produce wine. Between 1870 and 1880, Napa County's wine output increased by almost 1000%, and by 1890 Napa County was California's leading county in terms of gallons of wine produced. Much of the growth that Napa County experienced in the late nineteenth century is due to developments in infrastructure such as the telegraph and the railroad as well as cheap Chinese labor. The development of the railroad in Napa made it easy to transport crops, wine, and tourists.

During the tremendous growth in the 1870s, California wine developed a reputation for false labelling and dishonest adulteration processes. Gustave Niebaum, a wealthy businessman, established Inglenook winery with the intention of improving the wine industry's image, and in 1888 he began growing high quality wine grapes using French methods and techniques. Napa County experienced global exposure at the 1889 World's Fair in Paris where Inglenook wines won awards. Niebaum helped to improve the wine-making business in Napa so that it began to attract other wealthy entrepreneurs.

=== Major setbacks ===
As the turn of the 20th century approached, a series of setbacks commenced that devastated the Napa County wine industry for decades. A phylloxera outbreak decimated the wine grape crop, and this was followed by Prohibition in 1918, which made the production and transportation of alcohol illegal in the United States. In 1933, when Prohibition was repealed, the United States was in the midst of the Great Depression, and as a result the Napa County wine industry did not fully recover until the 1960s.

=== Modern era ===
In 1944, seven vintners signed an agreement that formed the Napa Valley Vintners trade association that would grow up until becoming an association with 550 wineries.

The Napa County wine industry was once again in a period of expansion as pioneering viticulturists with big visions such as Robert Mondavi in 1966 flocked to the valley; however, this time vintners and residents concerned about the population growth and shift towards urbanization in the region worked together to enact legislation making it more difficult to develop land in Napa. In 1968, Napa County passed the Napa Valley Agricultural Preserve, which protects rural open space within the county. As the new investors and vintners began focusing on Napa County, the Paris Wine Tasting of 1976 placed Napa viticulture on the world stage as two local wines were ranked #1, by renown French oenophiles, in a blind tasting over highly regarded French vintages. Since then, Napa County is internationally renown as a primer wine-producing region.

After the 1976 event, California and the Napa County wine industry grew exponentially. In 1975, Napa County was home to 45 wineries, and in 1980 there were over 100 wineries operating in Napa County. In 1981, Napa Valley became California's first designated American Viticultural Area (AVA). This level of growth has sustained to the present day, as in 2012, there were 430 wineries in Napa County. The relatively new brand of high quality wine that is now associated with Napa County has attracted many wealthy investors to the region, and today Napa's economy is booming due to the success of the wine industry and a thriving wine tourism industry.

== Terroir ==
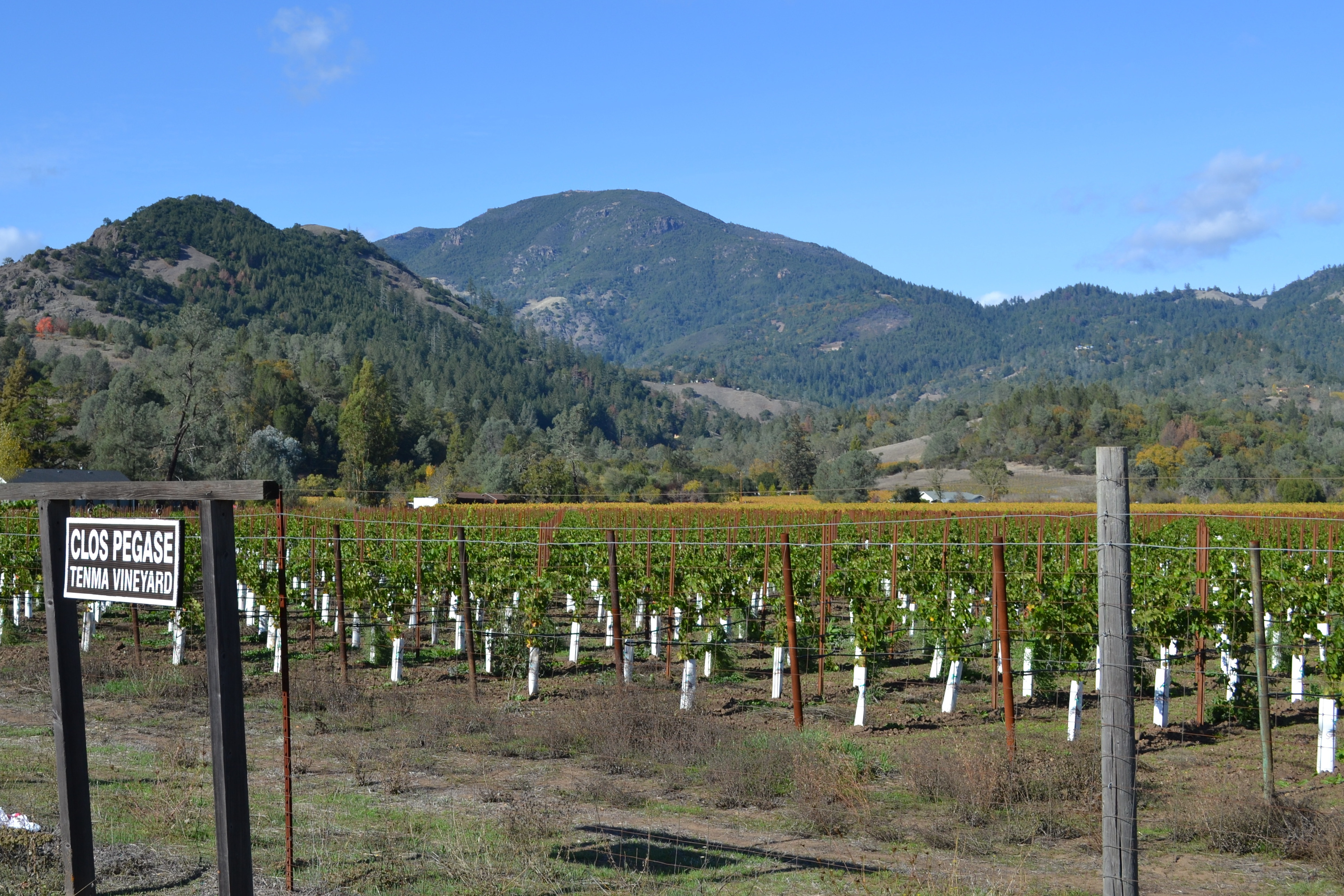
Vineyards and Mount Saint Helena

The Napa Valley is located east of Sonoma County under the backdrop of Mount Saint Helena, which is part of the Mayacamas Mountain Range. During the wine grape growing season, cool marine air from the Pacific Ocean and the San Pablo Bay flows into the southern end of the valley and goes up in elevation towards the northern end. Because of the increase in elevation, temperatures at the northern end of the valley tend to be significantly warmer than temperatures at the southern end. In addition to the differences in temperature, the western and northern portions of the valley experiences higher levels of precipitation than the eastern and southern portions due to a rain shadow caused by the vast differences in elevation in the region. The Napa Valley as a whole contains several climate regions, and this provides an ideal terroir for growing a variety of wine grapes due to the variation in temperature and precipitation as well as variations in soil composition and topography.

County names in the United States automatically qualify as legal appellations of origin for wine produced from grapes grown in that county and do not require registration with the U.S. Alcohol and Tobacco Tax and Trade Bureau (TTB).

== Wine and the local economy ==
=== By the numbers ===
In 2005, the Napa County wine industry was estimated to be worth in excess of $9.5 billion. Nearly 89% of all United States wine is produced in California, and roughly a third of California wineries are based in Napa County, but only about 4% of California wine is produced in Napa. Once Napa County wine was recognized on the world stage in France, local producers used the newfound reputation to sell wine from the region for a premium over other wines produced elsewhere in California of the same quality. Over 50% of California wine bottles costing more than $15 are produced in Napa County. It is because of this reputation that the return on one ton of wine grapes grown in Napa is $3600, while neighboring Sonoma comes in second at $2200 per ton as of 2012. In comparison with other wine grape growing regions in California, Napa ranks second to last in terms of wine grape yield per acre at just over 3 tons grown per acre.

=== Tourism ===
Wine tourism is a staple for Napa County's local economy. The concept of wine tourism is relatively new, and researchers have concluded that there are a number of factors that make Napa County an attractive destination for tourists. The Napa County lifestyle, for instance, which embodies the importance of wellness and relaxation as well as luxury and fine wine and cuisine, is thought to be a distinguishing factor that draws tourists. Another factor is the level of interconnectedness between industries within Napa County. Wine production is the bedrock of the local economy, and local hotels, restaurants, and wineries work together to collectively promote tourism in the region. Additionally, there is a high level of community involvement and support for the wine tourism industry in Napa County, as roughly half of the local population is employed by the wine related industries. A less likely, but still noteworthy contributor is Napa Valley's recent increase in dog-friendly wineries. According to the 2025 Wine Institute database, there are 19 dog-friendly wineries in Napa Valley, reflecting the region's growing appeal to pet owners.

In 2014, around 3.3 million people visited Napa Valley. Almost half of the visitors came from the San Jose–San Francisco–Oakland, MSA. Tourism supported 11 766 jobs in the zone. Travelers generated $1.63 billion in direct Napa County spending that year.

As of April 2016, Napa County is home to approximately 70 hotels, resorts, inns, and bed and breakfast type establishments geared towards the tourism industry, with a total room count of 4,815. This number is up from 3,371 in 2005 largely due a 40% increase from 2006 to 2010. The Great Recession caused a number of proposed development to be put on hold, and now many experts are saying the hotel industry in Napa County is on the verge of another boom, with more than 2,000 new guestrooms at 18 locations either being planned or currently under construction.

=== Environmental preservation controversy ===
There are significant benefits as well as negatives to the booming wine tourism industry in Napa County. For example, the Napa County wine industry generated $1.4 billion in wages in 2004. Most of the county's residents depend on the wine industry and tourism. On the other hand, the growing demand for hotels and resources for the tourism industry is causing controversy among locals. Many residents are concerned about increased levels of traffic, a dwindling water supply, infrastructure, and environmental pressures. Working to slow the growth in the wine tourism industry, there are many agricultural land protection policies (meant to maintain the character and agricultural quality of the region) in effect in Napa County that make it difficult and expensive to expand the tourism industry.

== See also ==
- Sonoma County wine
- Mendocino County wine
- Lake County wine
- Central Coast AVA
