= Oakville AVA =

American Viticultural Area in Napa Valley, California

Coordinates: 38°26′15″N 122°24′12″W

Oakville
- Wine region
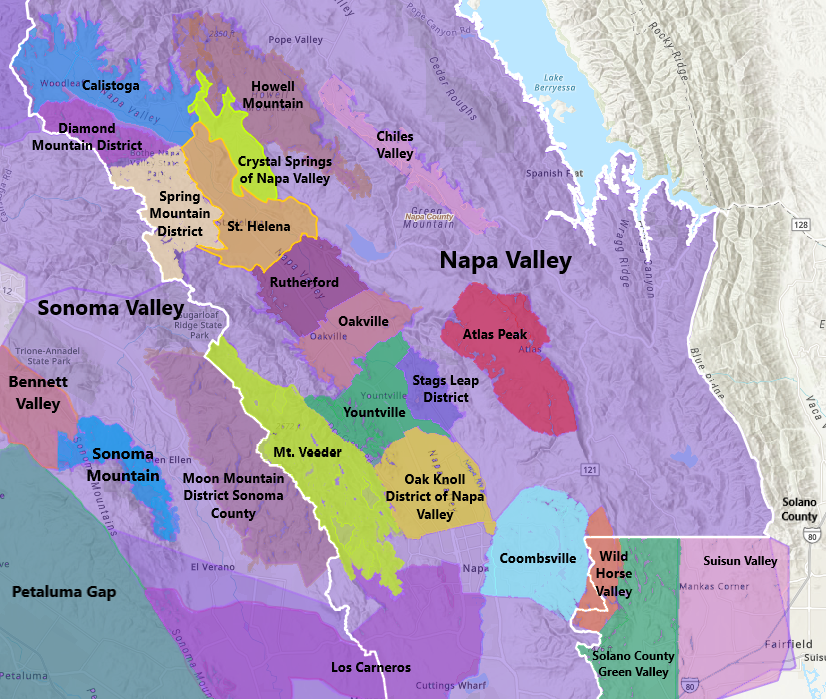
- Napa Valley AVAs
- Type: American Viticultural Area
- Year established: 1993
- Country: United States
- Part of: California, North Coast AVA, Napa County, Napa Valley AVA
- Other regions in California, North Coast AVA, Napa County, Napa Valley AVA: Atlas Peak AVA, Calistoga AVA, Chiles Valley AVA, Crystal Springs of Napa Valley AVA, Diamond Mountain District AVA, Howell Mountain AVA, Los Carneros AVA, Mt. Veeder AVA, Coombsville AVA, Oak Knoll District of Napa Valley AVA, Rutherford AVA, Spring Mountain District AVA, St. Helena AVA, Stags Leap District AVA, Wild Horse Valley AVA, Yountville AVA
- Growing season: 277 days
- Climate region: Region II-III
- Heat units: 3,124 GDD units
- Precipitation (annual average): 35 inches (889 mm)
- Soil conditions: Well & poorly drained loams, silt loams, and clay loams on floodplains, alluvial fans, and terraces
- Total area: 5,760 acres (9 sq mi)
- Size of planted vineyards: 5,000 acres (2,000 ha)
- No. of vineyards: 26+
- Grapes produced: Black Muscat, Cabernet Franc, Cabernet Sauvignon, Carmenere, Chardonnay, Malbec, Merlot, Muscat Canelli, Petit Verdot, Petite Sirah, Sangiovese, Sauvignon Blanc, Semillon, Syrah/Shiraz, Viognier, Zinfandel
- No. of wineries: 50+

Oakville is an American Viticultural Area (AVA) located in Napa County, California within south-central portion of the Napa Valley landform approximately 10 miles (16 km) northwest of the city of Napa and centered around the town of Oakville. The wine appellation was established as the nation's 121^{st}, the state's 70^{th} and county's tenth AVA on July 2, 1993 by the Bureau of Alcohol, Tobacco and Firearms (ATF), Treasury after reviewing the petition submitted by the Rutherford and Oakville Appellation Committee, on behalf of local vineyard and winery operators, proposing a viticultural area in Napa County to be known as "Oakville."

The Rutherford and Oakville Appellation Committee was composed of seven wineries and seven grape growers in the adjacent areas who petitioned both to be established which ATF ruled on the same day. Oakville, the sixth sub-appellation designated within Napa Valley AVA, has a warm climate well-suited to wine grape production. Wind and fog arriving from San Pablo Bay can affect the morning and evening hours, but their effects are limited by the intervening Yountville Hills. The viticultural area extends over a flat expanse of well-drained gravelly soil between the Vaca and Mayacamas Mountains. Its soil is the result of sedimentary deposits from the hills surrounding Napa Valley composed of gravelly and sandy loam with exceptionally good drainage. The area between State Route 29 and the Silverado Trail is a mixture of clay and well-drained sandy loam. The appellation is known for its success with Bordeaux varietals, which have produced wines of rich texture, firm tannins, and notes of mint and herbs. The plant hardiness zone range is 9a to 9b.

Because the village of Oakville is not an incorporated township, there are no municipal boundaries on which to rely in delimiting this area. Consequently, the petitioners to a great extent utilized commercial and public sector uses of the community name in establishing the boundaries of the Oakville viticultural area. The Oakville Crossroads and the Oakville Post Office are the most notable examples of the name's use within the area. Postal and telephone service areas are less relevant in terms of precise boundaries for the area but do attest to consumer recognition of Oakville as a distinct and separate community. Also, various wine press accounts have helped to define what 1s considered to be the Oakville area. One such account from The Connoisseurs' Handbook of California Wines includes the following entry:

Oakville (Napa). Situated in the southern end of Napa Valley, halfway between Yountville sad Rutherford, this way station is the home of several wineries (foremost among them the Robert Mondavi Winery) and adjoins some of the Nape Valley's best Cabernet growing turf. The superb Martha's Vineyard produced by Heitz Cellars and a substantial portion of the Robert Mondavi Cabernet vineyards are in Oakville, along the western edge of the valley floor. Other wineries In the area are Villa Mt. Eden and an Inglenook production and bottling plant. Of the approximately 13 bonded wineries located In the area, all but two have Oakville addresses. The only exceptions are one winery east of the Silverado Trail which uses a Napa address and one winery just south of the village of Oakville which uses a Rutherford address, due to its affiliation with a winery in the Rutherford area. The winery using the Napa address appears to do so because they receive their mail directly from the Napa post office rather than maintaining a post office box in Oakville. These bonded winery addresses (with the exceptions noted) help to substantiate the boundaries proposed in the petition.

== History ==
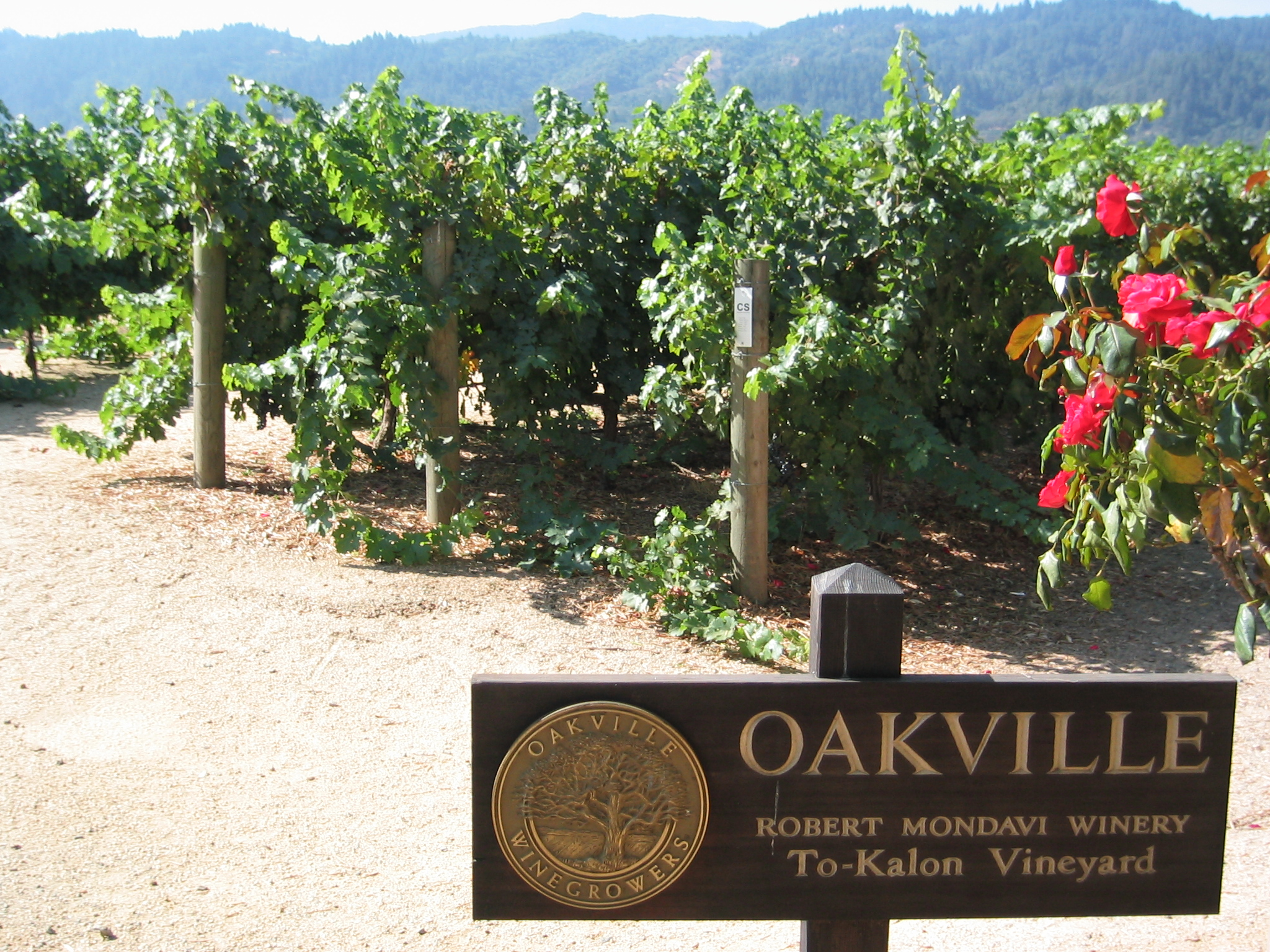
To-Kalon Vineyard, Robert Mondavi Winery

The name "Oakville" has been associated with the area between Yountville and Rutherford in the Napa Valley for over 100 years. From the mid-nineteenth through the early twentieth centuries, Oakville moved from an unnamed region with an unknown reputation to become a settled and integral part of Napa County and of the Napa Valley viticulture industry. Wine writers as early as the 1880s wrote highly of wine from H. W. Crabb planted the first vineyard here in 1868, on 240 acres (97 ha) of land close to the Napa River that he named To Kalon, Greek for "most beautiful". By 1877, Crabb had planted 130 acres (53 ha) and was producing 50,000 U.S. gallons (190,000 liters) of wine per year. By 1880, his vineyard had increased to 430 acres (170 ha). Much has been written of his grape-growing techniques and the success of his vineyards. Mr. Crabb's extensive landholdings, business and influence in the region south of Rutherford contributed to the establishment of the village of Oakville.
From 1850 to 1880, Oakville steadily increased in prominence as a community center. One reason for Its emergence was the establishment of the rail system from Napa to Calistoga in 1868. Geographer William Ketteringham writes, "With the completion of the (railroad) line in 1868 other settlements along the line such as Rutherford and Oakville sprang up." The Oakville Post Office was established in 1867 and the Oakville voting precinct was established in 1902. During the 1870s and early 1880s, there was rapid expansion in the number of vineyard plantings and wine production. H.W. Crab saw his first plantings of 1868 become the core of over 290 vineyard acres (120 ha) by 1880. During that year he produced over 300,000 U.S. gallons (1,100,000 liters) of wine or approximately 11 percent of all the wine produced in Napa Valley. Following the wine boom of the 1870s and early 1880s, Napa Valley wineries suffered a significant setback as phylloxera spread. Vineyard plantings decreased 83 percent over a ten-year period, from 18,177 acres (7,356 ha) in 1890 to 3,000 acres (1,200 ha) in 1900. This period was followed by Prohibition from 1919 to 1933. Surprisingly. planted acreage during Prohibition increased in Napa Valley to keep pace with the burgeoning demand for grapes used to make medicinal, sacramental and home wines, which remained legal. After Prohibition, planted acreage in Napa County remained at around 10,000 acres (4,000 ha) through the 1960s. Not until the wine renaissance of the 1970s was the acreage total of 1890 surpassed. The historic To Kalon Vineyard, owned by the Robert Mondavi Winery, Andy Beckstoffer and four other owners, is still producing grapes today. In 1903, the United States Department of Agriculture established an experimental vineyard station in Oakville. Known as "Oakville Station", the vineyard is operated by the University of California at Davis.
The name Oakville has a long history of use by wine books and magazines to describe this prominent Napa Valley wine community. Some examples of these publications include The Connoisseurs' Handbook of California Wines by Charles E. Olken, Earl G. Singer and Norman S. Roby, third edition, revised, 1984. The Wine Spectator magazine, "The Rutherford Bench" by James Laube, July 15, 1987; the Friends of Wine magazine, "Napa Winery Profiles: The Quest for Site", May 1984. and "Beck to the Vineyards" by Bob Thompson, May 1965; and the Modern Encyclopedia of Wine, by Hugh Johnson, second edition, revised and updated, 1987.

== Terroir ==
=== Topography ===
Napa Valley can be divided into a group of distinct topographical areas: the lowland Napa River valley between the Mayacamas and Vaca Ranges; the mountains themselves; and the intermontane, eastern portions of the county beyond the watershed of the Napa River. The elevational differences and relief between these areas are pronounced and influence all aspects of the region's physical geography (climate, geomorphology, hydrology, soils and vegetation). The floor of the Napa Valley is 25 miles (40 km) in length south to north and between one and four miles (1.6 and 6.4 km) wide. Traversing the entire length of the valley is the Napa River, which commences north of Calistoga and-drains into San Pablo Bay. Along its course through the valley, the river elevation drops from around 380 feet (120 m) near the city of Calistoga to around 20 feet (6.1 m) near the city of Napa. The gently sloping valley floor, however, is interrupted by numerous bedrock outcrops which form isolated bench hills, hence, the Rutherford and Oakville Benches. In other places, the valley floor features broad alluvial fans extending toward the center of the valley from mountain streams which serve as tributaries to the Napa River.
The Yountville Hills are the highest of these "bedrock islands" and have influenced the geographic evolution of the Oakville area. In other places, the valley floor features broad alluvial fans extending toward the center of the valley from mountain streams which serve as tributaries to the Napa River. Two fundamental geographic distinctions within Napa Valley are particularly relevant to the delimitation of the Oakville viticultural area: On the east–west axis, mountain versus valley floor, delineating the valley floor viticultural environments; and on the north–south axis, climatic differences as the result of a decreasing incursion of maritime air into the valley. These distinctions can be integrated with the community identity of Oakville (and the other communities of Napa Valley) to provide consumers with meaningful and distinctive reference points concerning the viticulture of Napa Valley. From the perspective of a wine consumer, such basic geographic distinctions offer a useful introduction to the complexity of viticulture in Napa Valley.

=== Geology ===
Geological history is an important factor in shaping Napa Valley viticultural environments. Napa Valley is largely a synclinal (down-folded) valley of Cenozoic age. Faulting (accompanied by minor folding) throughout the valley later resulted in the formation of bedrock "islands" (outcrops) across the valley floor. These rock islands have been modified during the last million years through erosion by the Napa River, its tributaries and other erosional slope processes. Sections of the old Napa River channel are still visible here and there in the valley, including in several places within the Rutherford viticultural area. In this central portion of the valley, much of the old river channel and its alluvial sediments have been buried by more recent Napa River floodplain sediments, but they principally have been covered by alluvial fans emerging from the mountain streams on the western and eastern sides of the valley. The age and size of these fan surfaces are a function of climatic change, basin lithology (mineral composition and structure of rocks), and basin size, all of which vary among the four major drainage basins in the Rutherford and Oakville areas, accounting for differences in these fan surfaces. The northern fans (in the Rutherford area) are the larger geomorphic features, have more significantly controlled the course of the Napa River through time, and are geologically more diverse.

=== Climate ===
A previously, published report, prepared by the National Oceanic and Atmospheric Administration (NOAA) and submitted on behalf of the Napa Valley Appellation petition in 1980, established the general weather and climatic differences of Napa County. This report showed that Napa Valley can be divided into two general climatic regions (coastal and inland), and three topographical areas-the valley itself lying within the Mayacamas Range to the west and the Vaca Range to the east; the area within the mountains themselves; and the area covering the eastern portion of the county. The elevation within Napa County increases as one progresses north up the valley. With this increase in elevation there is an increase in precipitation, ranging from 20 inches (510 mm) in the south to 50 inches (1,300 mm) in the north. Additionally, the coastal influence in the Napa Valley results in a relatively moderate climate in the south (warmer than the northern area of Napa Valley in the winter and cooler in the summer) and a relatively extreme climate in the north (hotter than the southern area of Napa Valley in the summer and colder in the winter).

=== Soils ===
The "General Soil Map" of Napa County, California, prepared by the United States Department of Agriculture (U.S.D.A.). Soil Conservation Service, shows most of the Napa Valley floor as being generally the same types of soils. These soils are the Bale-Cole-Yalo series which are nearly level to gently sloping, well drained and somewhat poorly drained loams, silt loams, and clay loams on flood plains, alluvial fans, and terraces. In addition to the Bale series, the Pleasanton soil series dominates much of the central section of the Napa Valley floor. Both of these soil series consist of deep, alluvial soils. According to Associate Professor Deborah L. Elliott-Fisk. Department of Geography, University of California, Davis, the high frequency of clasts from Sonoma Volcanics in the Oakville fan soils unifies the Oakville viticultural area and distinguishes it from Rutherford. The contribution of small percentages of metamorphic clasts (such as serpentine and chert) on the Rutherford fan soils contributes to minor soil differences between the Rutherford viticultural area and Oakville. The composition of these types of minerals and rocks tends to raise the soil pH slightly in the Rutherford area and alters soil texture and plant nutrition. After a review of the entire record in this matter, including all data submitted pursuant to the public hearing, ATF believes that there is sufficient evidence with respect to name, boundaries, and geographical features to warrant the establishment of the Oakville viticultural area.

The occurrence of specific soil types can be related to topography in Napa Valley, as topography is one of the five variables that controls soil formation. The Soil Survey of Napa County, California [hereinafter Soil Survey], published by the U.S. Department of Agriculture Soil Conservation Service in 1978, divides the 11 soil associations of Napa County into two general categories: lowland depositional soils, which account for four of the 11 soil associations and are found on alluvial fans, floodplains, valleys and terraces; and upland residual soils, which account for the remaining seven soil associations, and are found on bedrock and colluvially-mantled slopes. The "General Soil Map" from the Soil Survey shows the location of these upland and lowland soils. This map as well as the text of the Soil Survey show that the lowland-upland soil break occurs at around the 500-foot (150 m) elevation. This same elevation line has been used, with one exception, to differentiate the Oakville viticultural area from the mountains to the east and west. As one proceeds down Napa Valley, Zinfandel Lane marks the widening of the valley floor, which continues until the appearance of the Yountville Hills at the southern end of Oakville. Part of the southern boundary of the Oakville viticultural area is a depositional ridge which projects perpendicularly across the valley towards the Yountville Hills. This ridge is located at the narrowest point between the Yountville Hills and the Mayacamas Range. To the north of this ridge, streams drain towards the northeast, and to the south of this ridge streams drain to the southeast. The ridge, which is at an overall elevation of around 200 ft (61 m), thus functions as a drainage divide.

== Wineries ==
There are over 50 wineries located within, or source their grapes from vineyards in, the Oakville AVA. Many are small, boutique wineries (like Harlan Estate, Screaming Eagle and Spoto Wines) with limited production.
