= Whitehall Lane =

Coordinates: 38.477821°N 122.437865°W

Whitehall Lane Winery & Vineyards
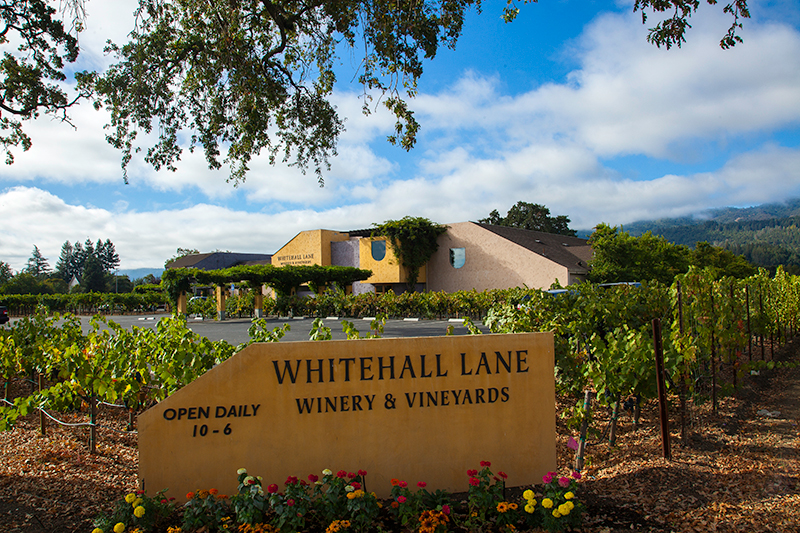
- Winery Estate
- Location: St. Helena, California, United States
- Appellation: Rutherford AVA
- Founded: 1979
- First vintage: 1981
- Key people: Tom Leonardini, Sr., Owner; Jason Moulton, Winemaker
- Cases/yr: approx. 45,000
- Known for: Cabernet sauvignon
- Varietals: Cabernet sauvignon, Merlot, Chardonnay, Sauvignon blanc, Pinot noir
- Tasting: tasting room
- Website: whitehalllane.com

Whitehall Lane Winery & Vineyards is a winery located in St. Helena, California, United States. It is owned and operated by the Leonardini Family. In 2023, they celebrated their 30th year of Family Winemaking in the Napa Valley.

== History ==
Whitehall Lane Winery was originally started by Art Finklestein and Alan Stein in 1979 on the 25-acre (10 ha) site that was originally planted in the 1800s. They operated for over a decade before selling the winery to the Leonardini Family in 1993. Whitehall Lane owns more than 200 acres (81 ha) of vineyards in several of Napa and Sonoma Counties' fertile wine appellations including Rutherford, St. Helena, Oak Knoll District, Sonoma Valley and recently Petaluma Gap.

== Wines ==
Whitehall Lane produces cabernet sauvignon, merlot, pinot noir, sauvignon blanc and chardonnay. It has been recognized for producing world-class wines by Wine Spectator Magazine. In 2003, Whitehall Lane was the first winery in the world to seal its bottles with Vino-Seal glass stoppers.
