= Spoto Wines =

American winery located in California

Coordinates: 38.42275°N 122.39764°W

Spoto Family Wines is a winery in Sacramento, California, founded by Stuart Spoto.

In 2004, Stuart built and licensed the first bonded winery in Sacramento County, California allowing him to sell his wines.

By 2010, Stuart operated the business full-time. In November 2010, Spoto Family Wines became a member of the Oakville Wine Growers Association, which promotes the Oakville AVA in Napa Valley. A year later, Spoto Family Wines was granted membership into the Napa Valley Vintners, which promotes Napa Valley wines.

In 2012, the wines were served at the Napa Valley Auction, and a Taste of Oakville at Carnegie Hall.
