= Mount Veeder AVA =

American Viticultural Area in California

Coordinates: 38°21′04″N 122°22′53″W

Mt. Veeder
- Wine region
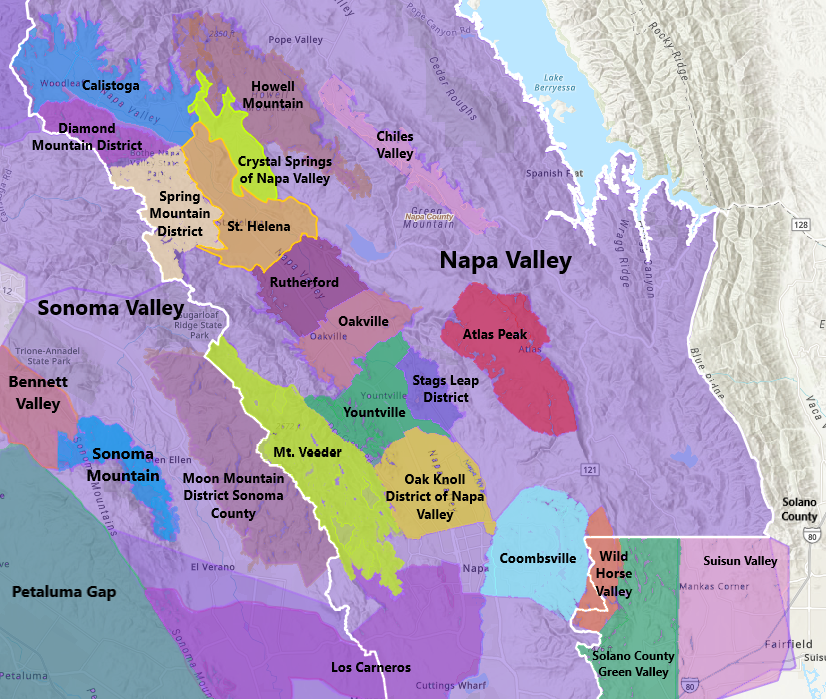
- Napa Valley AVAs
- Type: American Viticultural Area
- Year established: 1990; 1993 Amended
- Years of wine industry: 166
- Country: United States
- Part of: California, North Coast, Napa County, Napa Valley AVA
- Other regions in California, North Coast, Napa County, Napa Valley AVA: Atlas Peak AVA, Calistoga AVA, Chiles Valley AVA, Diamond Mountain District AVA, Howell Mountain AVA, Los Carneros AVA, Oak Knoll District of Napa Valley AVA, Oakville AVA, Rutherford AVA, Spring Mountain District AVA, St. Helena AVA, Stags Leap District AVA, Wild Horse Valley AVA, Yountville AVA
- Growing season: 273 days
- Climate region: Region I-IV
- Heat units: 2001–3534 GDD
- Precipitation (annual average): 25–65 in (640–1,650 mm)
- Soil conditions: loams and clay loams to gravelly or stony sandy loams, loams and clay loams
- Total area: 15,000+ acres (24+ sq mi)
- Size of planted vineyards: 1,000+ acres (400+ ha)
- No. of vineyards: 12
- Grapes produced: Cabernet Franc, Cabernet Sauvignon, Carignane, Charbono, Chardonnay, Chenin Blanc, Malbec, Merlot, Mourvedre/Mataro, Petite Sirah, Petit Verdot, Pinot Noir, Sauvignon Blanc, Syrah, Viognier, Zinfandel
- No. of wineries: 40

Mt. Veeder is an American Viticultural Area (AVA) located near the western boundary of Napa County, California, in the most southerly portion of the Mayacamas Mountains which separates Napa Valley and Sonoma Valley landforms. The wine appellation was established on February 20, 1990, as the nation's 107^{th}, the state's 62^{nd} and the county's seventh AVA by the Bureau of Alcohol, Tobacco and Firearms (ATF), Treasury after reviewing the petition submitted by Mr. Robert E. Craig, President of Napa Valley Estate Vineyards and Winery, on behalf of local vintners, proposing a viticultural area named "Mt. Veeder."
Although the petition was for the name "Mt. Veeder-Napa Valley," ATF only approved the name "Mt. Veeder" since the evidence submitted with the petition and during the comment period did not support the inclusion of "Napa Valley."

Mount Veeder is the prominent 2,677-foot (816 m) peak in the area. The mountain and viticultural area are named for Reverend Peter V. Veeder, who arrived in Napa in the mid-1850's and became pastor of the Napa Presbyterian Church in 1859. Reverend Veeder appears to have been a frequent visitor to the mountains west of Napa during the 1850s and 1860s, where he enjoyed hiking and climbing. The exact date his name was first applied to the peak is uncertain, although the Napa Daily Register referred to the peak by his name in a July 11, 1879 article.
The boundaries of the appellation encompasses 24 square miles (15,000 acres) with 1,000 acres (400 ha) under vine in thin volcanic soil. Many vineyards are found on the steep mountain face some as steep as 30°. The steepness of the angle gives the vineyards benefits of more direct sunlight and better drainage. The unique sense of place, or terroir of Mt. Veeder AVA produces wines that are typically powerful in structure – depending on how they are made and how the vines are tended. For example, Cabernet Sauvignon grown on the mountain commonly shows "briary" flavors, moderate to bold tannins and herbal, floral aromatics. With the increasing interest in wine in America, wines grown in sub-appellations such as Mt. Veeder are gaining recognition for their unique terroir. Mt. Veeder is responsible for about 1.3% of total Napa Valley production, or 40,000 cases per vintage. There are 35 vintners producing wines from Mt. Veeder viticultual area, such as Alpha Omega, Black Stallion, Domaine Chandon, Hess, Mayacamas winery, Rudd and The Vice. The plant hardiness zones are 9a and 9b.

In 1993, an addendum for the AVA was established where 363 acres (147 ha) was added to the northern boundary including a 30-acre (12 ha) vineyard that was completed after the 1990 designation. The petitioner, actor Robin Williams, stated that his estate and vineyard, in the extension area, was a project under construction prior to the appellation recognition and completed afterwards. He believed the omission of this acreage was an oversight. As evidence, Mr. Williams presented documentation supporting the boundary revision from the original petitioner, the present Chairperson of the Mt. Veeder Appellation Council, and the same experts in soil and climate who reviewed the original petition. The addition also is located in Napa County on the eastern slope of the Mayacamas Mountains that separates Napa Valley and Sonoma Valley contiguous to the northernmost boundary of the existing viticultural area.

== History ==
The boundaries of the Mt. Veeder viticultural area coincide in a general manner with those of a region once known as the "Napa Redwoods" (and sometimes referred to in variations such as "The Redwoods" or "the Redwoods district"). Although "Napa Redwoods" substantially ceased to be used as a term for the region in the 1940s having been supplanted by "Mt. Veeder," this terminology is reflected in the historical evidence regarding the boundaries.
Mt. Veeder viticulture production began about 1860, when Stalham Wing acquired land and planted grapes in what is now known as Wing Canyon, between Dry Creek and Mt. Veeder Creek. Although no records exist to indicate that Mr. Wing established a commercial winery, an article published in the California Farmer clearly shows that he was producing grapes and wine by 1864, when both were exhibited at the 1864 Napa County Fair. Important to boundary considerations on a historical basis is that, in virtually all newspaper accounts during this era, the Mt. Veeder – Napa Valley viticultural area (under the then used name "Napa Redwoods") was recognized as a distinct sub-district of Napa Valley, separate from surrounding areas such as Browns Valley, Napa and Yountville.
Phylloxera took its toll on grape growing in the area in the late 1880s and 1890s. The California State Phylloxera Study of 1893 lists seven vineyards totaling 336 acres (136 ha), five of which had wineries with cooperage totaling 101,000 gallons whose owner's names correspond to those shown in the Mt. Veeder area of Napa County on the "Official Map to the County of Napa, California", published in 1895. In all likelihood, there were more vineyards in the region than noted in the study, as at least one major vineyard (the one planted by H. Hudeman and by then owned by Rudolf Jordan Jr.) was not listed. Despite the serious effect of phylloxera on the vineyards, some wine production continued in the Mt. Veeder area during this era and at least one new winery, Mt. Veeder Winery, built in 1889 by J.H. Fischer near Lokoya, went into operation.
A resurgence in wine production in the area began in the late 1890s and early 1900s. Theodore Gier bought the Hudeman property from Rudolf Jordan Jr. in 1900. He replanted and expanded the vineyards and built a large stone winery in 1903, where he produced wines bottled under the Sequoia Vineyards and Giersburger labels for his Theodore Gier Wine Company, based in Oakland, California. Ernest Streich, who replanted the vineyard founded by his father in 1881 near Redwood Creek west of Gier's property was resistant rootstock in the 1890s and started producing wine under the Castle Rock Vineyards label. Rudolf Jordan Jr. assisted Streich with winemaking and Castle Rock appears to have been one of the first wineries in California to use cultured yeast and cold fermentation. The Gier winery was closed by Prohibition, while grapes from Castle Rock Vineyards were used to make condensed grape juice. The Christian Brothers purchased Theodore Gier's property in 1930 and moved their winemaking operations there. Renaming the property Mont LaSalle, the Christian Brothers initially produced medicinal and sacramental wine in the facility. After the Repeal of Prohibition, The Christian Brothers moved into the production of table wines and introduced their product under the Mont LaSalle Vineyards label in 1938. Mont LaSalle was the organization's only winery until 1945. and the base on which they developed their quality reputation. Although Christian Brothers moved their winery operation from Mont LaSalle in 1983, the vineyards continue be a major source of grapes for the Christian Brothers' premium wines. In 1941, Jack and Mary Taylor purchased the Mt. Veeder Winery built by J.M. Fischer in 1889. The Taylors reequipped the winery, and replanted 40 acres (16 ha) of vineyards to Chardonnay (probably the largest Chardonnay planting in California up to that time) in the late 1940s. Beginning in 1951 under the Taylors' ownership and continuing under the ownership of Bob Travers, who purchased the winery in 1968, Mayacamas Winery has established a national reputation for premium wines.

Beginning in 1965 and continuing to the present time a number of new vineyard plantings have been developed in the Mt. Veeder viticultural area. In 1990, five wineries, Mayacamas Winery, Sky Vineyards, Hess Collection Winery, Mt. Veeder Winery and Vose Vineyards operated in the viticultural area, each with adjacent estate vineyards which supplies their grapes. A sixth winery and estate vineyard was under development. The vineyard acreage now exceeds 1,000 acres (400 ha) with about 12 vineyards and over 40 wineries.

== Terroir ==
=== Topography ===
The Mt. Veeder viticultural area encompasses the eastern slopes of the Mayacamas Mountains west of the city of Napa. The area is roughly triangular in shape, extending southeastward from its apex at Bald Mountain to the rolling hills north of the Los Carneros District. Elevations generally range from approximately 2,200 feet (670 m) at its northern apex to 400 feet (120 m) in the southern end. Mt. Veeder, located in Napa County, is the highest peak in the viticultural area with an elevation of 2,677 feet (816 m).
Although historically established in a general manner, the precise boundaries of the Mt. Veeder viticultural area have been drawn with a sensitivity to both historical evidence and the geographical features distinguishing this region from those surrounding it. Care was taken to include all the vineyard locations which are responsible for the region's viticultural history as well as those vineyards which contributed to its reputation in recent years by having been the sources for wines bearing the Mt. Veeder appellation. The western boundary follows the common boundary line between Napa County and Sonoma County along the ridge line of the Mayacamas Mountains and, to the south, the same ridge line within Napa County. This boundary is consistent with historical western boundary of the region and effectively puts wineries such as Mayacamas Vineyards, Sky Vineyards and the historic Castle Rock Vineyards within the viticultural area. This boundary also acknowledges the climate and geographic differences between the viticultural area and the slopes of Mount Veeder that extend into Sonoma Valley to the west. In following the 400 ft (120 m) elevation line for virtually its entire length, the southern boundary incorporates part of the northern boundary line of the already established Los Carneros viticultural area. By following this elevation line, this boundary includes vineyards historically significant to the region, such as Mont LaSalle. On the east side, the viticultural area boundary runs along the 400 ft (120 m) elevation line, the Range 5 West line and Dry Creek. This boundary includes within it Pickle Canyon and Wing Canyon, previously shown as significant to the grape growing history of the Mt. Veeder viticultural area and is consistent with the historical eastern limits of the region. The northern boundary along Dry Creek and continuing to the common boundary line between Napa County and Sonoma County is consistent with the historical limits of the viticultural area, and includes the significant plantings of William Hill Winery and Vose Vineyards, both of which have highlighted Mt. Veeder as the source of their grapes. This boundary is likewise defined by the northern limit of the region's distinctive climate and geography and marks the general northern limit of vineyard plantings in this part of the Mayacamas Mountains of Napa County. Going north from this boundary, plantings on the Napa side of the ridge line effectively end, to resume several miles later on the slopes of Spring Mountain.

=== Climate ===
The climate of the Mt. Veeder viticultural area is characterized by cool, moist winters and warm, dry summers. Throughout the year in virtually all climatic zones, a natural temperature inversion develops at night, as cold, heavy air settles and warm, lighter air rises. Because of its elevated location, the minimum temperature in the Mt. Veeder region is warmer than that on the valley floor or adjacent to San Francisco Bay during both summer and winter. This inversion limits frost during the winter and keeps the region relatively frost-free during the spring, when vineyard bud push, flowering and crop "set" takes place. Rainfall increases with elevation, ranging from about 25 inches (640 mm) at lower elevations to over 65 inches (1,700 mm) at higher elevations in the northern part of the area. The elevated terrain of the Mt. Veeder region is a factor. The region receives more rainfall than the land east, south and north of it due to the terrain forcing the moist air masses of winter storms upward as they move inland along a southeasterly path from the coast, causing condensation. As Mt. Veeder is the highest point along the Mayacamas Mountains for several miles, the effect is very pronounced in the region. Rainfall averaged 49 inches (1,200 mm) a year over a 25-year period at a location near the center of the Mt. Veeder area, compared to an average rainfall of 25 to 35 inches (640–890 mm), depending on location, in Napa Valley, Sonoma Valley and the Los Carneros. Conversely, the mean annual temperatures decrease with elevation, but the seasonal range and temperature extremes are less at the lower elevation. This is due to the moderating effect of cooling breezes from San Pablo Bay plus the periodic fog and low clouds at lower elevations. The pattern of changing climatic conditions with increasing elevation is reflected in a variety of plant communities throughout the viticultural area. At lower elevations, the vegetation is mostly open grassland with scattered oaks. With increasing elevation and precipitation, the plant cover changes to a dense shrub or mixed shrub-oak-madrone-plant community at intermediate elevations and then to a cover of redwood and douglas fir with some madrone, oaks and laurels at higher elevations or in more humid, north facing slopes along creeks at intermediate levels.

=== Soil ===
The soils of the Mt. Veeder viticultural area are representative of residual upland soils developed from the weathering of underlying bedrock. Textures range from loams and clay loams to gravelly or stony sandy loams, loams and clay loams. Some soils are deep and permeable while others are shallow with slowly permeable bedrock.
Soil reaction varies from neutral or slightly acid to moderately or strongly acid. Color ranges from light gray or pale brown to grayish brown, brown and dark brown, or reddish brown and dark reddish brown, depending on the type of parent material and the amount of organic matter present. The wide ranges of soil characteristics of the upland soils of the viticultural area were recognized by the Soil Conservation Service in their 1978 "Soil Survey of Napa County, California." In their mapping and classification of the upland soils, they recognized 17 soil series, 31 soil types of phases, and 1 miscellaneous land type. Grapes are currently grown on 9 of these soils which are moderately deep or deep and have 4 to 7 inches (100–180 mm) or 6 to 10 inches (150–250 mm) of available water holding capacity (AWC), respectively. The moderate depth to bedrock, generally 30 to 60 inches (760–1,520 mm), of the grape producing upland soils of the Mt. Veeder viticultural area limits the depth and size of the soil reservoir for rooting, plant nutrients, and available soil moisture. Additionally, not all of the 25 to 65 inches (640–1,650 mm) of winter rainfall is effective as much of it runs off, especially on steeper slopes. This loss of runoff waters and the lower AWC of the soils results in limited soil moisture in the late summer and fall months. The alluvial soils in the Napa Valley, by nature of their mode of formation, types of parent material and physiographic position, are distinctively different, both genetically and morphologically, from the residual upland soils of the Mt. Veeder viticultural area. The diversity of parent material and the wide range of soil characteristics was recognized by the Soil Conservation Service in their mapping and classification of the soils of Napa County. In the Napa Valley they recognized 10 soil series. None of these valley soils are found on upland slopes in the Mt. Veeder viticultural area. The county line between Sonoma County and Napa County is the drainage divide between the watersheds of Sonoma Creek and the Napa River. There is a sharp contrast between soils and vegetation on the southwest facing slopes in Sonoma County and northeast facing slopes in Napa County where the Mt. Veeder viticultural area is located. This difference in soils and vegetation is partially due to the microclimate aspect differences between the warmer, more arid southwest facing slopes and the cooler, more humid northeast facing slopes. The warmer, southwest slopes have a greater loss of soil moisture which is reflected in the formation of shallow soils and a less humid shrub or brush type of vegetation. There are also significant differences in the geology between the Sonoma County and Napa County sides of the Mayacamas Mountains. The rocks on the southwest slopes in Sonoma County are entirely volcanic in origin (Sonoma Volcanics). On these southwest slopes there are broad, extensive areas of volcanic rockland and large acreages of the shallow gravelly, cobbly or rocky soils of the Goulding and Toomes series. There are no Goulding or Toomes soils in the Mt. Veeder viticultural area and rockland is very rare. In comparison, the geology of the Mayacamas Mountains in Napa County is a combination of both volcanic rocks (Sonoma Volcanics) and sedimentary rocks. The soils have developed from sandstones and shales which are absent on the southwest slopes of the Mayacamas Mountains in Sonoma County. There are distinct and significant differences in soils, geology, vegetation and climate between the southwestern slopes and the eastern slopes of the Mayacamas Mountains which support the justification of the Mt. Veeder viticultural area.

== Viticulture ==
In recent years, Mt. Veeder wines have established a solid reputation for quality and distinctive personality. This reputation is the result of a growing interest on the part of the wine industry and wine consumers in specific designations of grape origin and subtle shadings of character and style that these locations bring to the wine. With a dominance in production and recognition, Cabernet Sauvignon in Mt. Veeder has garnered the greatest publicity for its regional character. Publications such as Connoisseur's Guide to California Wine have pointed to the intense quality and good structure of the Cabernet Sauvignon from the area. However, other wines produced from the region's grapes including Sauvignon Blanc, Chenin Blanc, Chardonnay and Zinfandel have gained individual recognition for their special character. In keeping with the growing interest in and concern regarding grape origin and distinctive quality and character in California wines, a number of vintners both within and outside the Mt. Veeder viticultural area have – beginning in 1973 – used their labels to highlight the fact that their grapes came from Mt. Veeder. The use of Mt. Veeder by highly regarded wineries such as William Hill Winery, Vose Vineyards, Mt. Veeder Winery, Pine Ridge Winery and Veedercrest is a solid indicator of the reputation for quality and character the region has developed over the years.

== See also ==
- Domaine Chandon California
- Mayacamas Vineyards
