= St. Helena AVA =

American Viticultural Area in California

Coordinates: 38°30′54″N 122°30′32″W

St. Helena
- Wine region
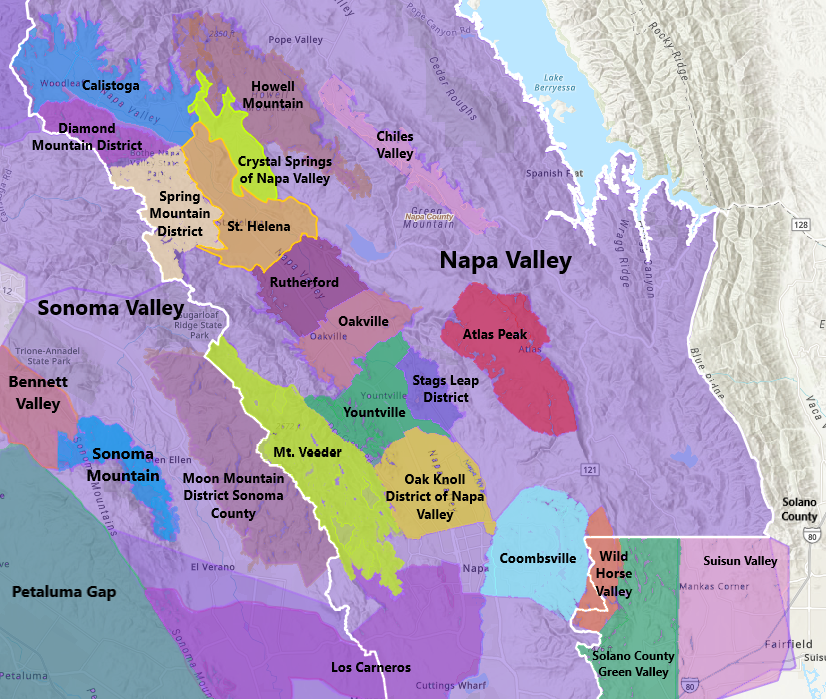
- Napa Valley AVAs
- Official name: St. Helena
- Type: American Viticultural Area
- Year established: 1995
- Years of wine industry: 166
- Country: United States
- Part of: California, North Coast AVA, Napa County, Napa Valley AVA
- Other regions in California, North Coast AVA, Napa County, Napa Valley AVA: Atlas Peak AVA, Calistoga AVA, Chiles Valley AVA, Crystal Springs of Napa Valley AVA, Diamond Mountain District AVA, Howell Mountain AVA, Los Carneros AVA, Mt. Veeder AVA, Coombsville AVA, Oak Knoll District of Napa Valley AVA, Oakville AVA, Rutherford AVA, Spring Mountain District AVA, Stags Leap District AVA, Wild Horse Valley AVA, Yountville AVA
- Total area: 9,060 acres (14 sq mi)
- Size of planted vineyards: 6,800 acres (2,800 ha)
- No. of vineyards: 400
- Varietals produced: Zinfandel, Cabernet Sauvignon, Chardonnay, Sangiovese, Merlot, Cabernet Franc, Syrah, Petit Verdot
- No. of wineries: 93

St. Helena is an American Viticultural Area (AVA) located within Napa Valley landform, centered in and around the town of St. Helena, California. The wine appellation was established as the nation's 127^{th}, the state's 75^{th} and county's twelfth AVA on September 11, 1995 by the Bureau of Alcohol, Tobacco and Firearms (ATF), Treasury after reviewing the petition submitted by Mr. Charles A. Carpy, Chairman of the St. Helena Appellation Committee, proposing to establish a new viticultural area in Napa County to be known as "St. Helena."

The St. Helena Appellation Committee is composed of various vineyard and winery owners located throughout the St. Helena locale. The viticultural area is located approximately sixteen miles (26 km) northwest of the city of Napa. It is a sub-appellation within the larger, previously established Napa Valley viticultural area and is densely planted with 6,800 acres (2,800 ha) of vines sourcing 93 wineries.

== History ==
In 1860, George Belden Crane planted Mission vines in St. Helena, and the vineyard produced its first wine in 1862. By 1874, the vineyard had produced 500,000 gallons of wine annually. Charles Krug, one of the pioneer vintners of Napa Valley, founded his winery in 1861 in the St. Helena district. Krug also established the St. Helena Viticultural Club in 1876.

== Terroir ==
=== Geography ===
St. Helena AVA encompasses approximately 9,060 acres (14 sq mi) along the flat narrow land towards the northern end of the valley between the Vaca and Mayacamas Mountains. Its soil is mostly loam with good water retention and varying amounts of gravel.

=== Climate ===
The area has a Warm-summer Mediterranean climate, and is somewhat hotter than nearby wine growing regions with summer temperatures that often reach the mid 90s Fahrenheit. It receives approximately 40 inches of rainfall per year. The USDA plant hardiness zone range is 9a to 9b.

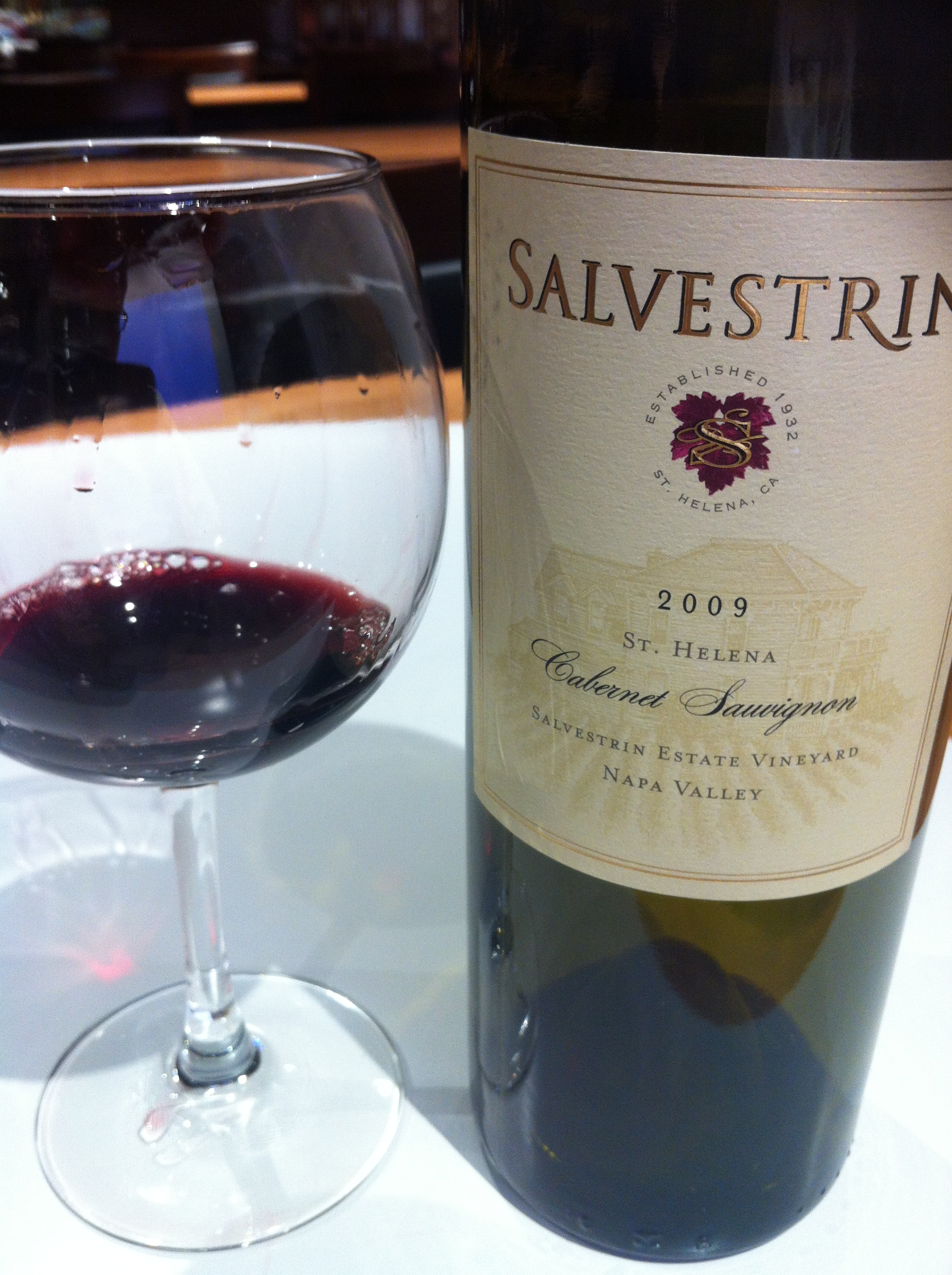
St. Helena Cabernet Sauvignon

== Viticulture ==
The region is known for its red wines, including Zinfandel, Petite Sirah and Pinot Noir, although white wines are also produced there such as Chardonnay. Its terroir is particularly well suited to Bordeaux, particularly Sauvignon Blanc. St. Helena's Cabernet Sauvignon is noted for its quality.
