= Monte Vista and Diamond Mountain Vineyard =

- U.S. National Register of Historic Places
- Location within California
- Location: 2121 Diamond Mountain Rd., Calistoga, California
- Coordinates: 38°32′37″N 122°34′48″W
- Area: 26 acres (11 ha)
- Built: 1896
- Built by: Bradbury, John
- NRHP reference No.: 12001144
- Added to NRHP: January 9, 2013

The Monte Vista and Diamond Mountain Vineyard, at 2121 Diamond Mountain Rd. in Calistoga, California, was listed on the National Register of Historic Places in 2013. The listing included five contributing buildings and a contributing site.

It is a six-building farm complex and a vineyard.

The property, then a 120 acres (49 ha) area on the eastern slope of Diamond Mountain, was purchased by Andrew Rasmussen, an immigrant from Denmark, from George W. Briggs in 1895. Ramussen commissioned the building of a farmhouse, carriage house and barn by a John Bradbury.

It was a single-family farm until Prohibition began in 1920.
