= Rutherford AVA =

American Viticultural Area in Napa Valley, California

Coordinates: 38°27′31″N 122°25′24″W

Rutherford
- Wine region
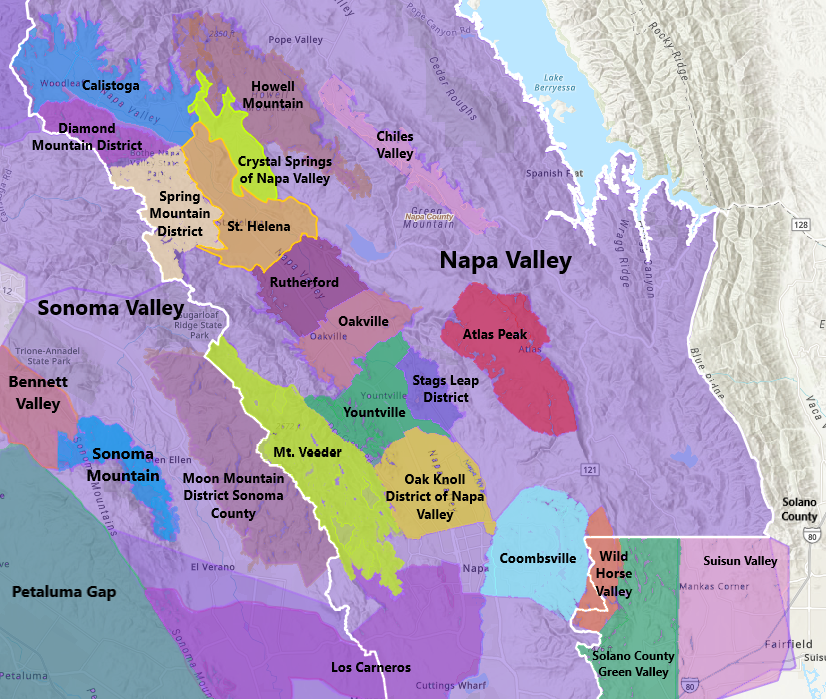
- Napa Valley AVAs
- Type: American Viticultural Area
- Year established: 1993
- Years of wine industry: 146
- Country: United States
- Part of: California, North Coast AVA, Napa County, Napa Valley AVA
- Other regions in California, North Coast AVA, Napa County, Napa Valley AVA: Atlas Peak AVA, Calistoga AVA, Chiles Valley AVA, Crystal Springs of Napa Valley AVA, Diamond Mountain District AVA, Howell Mountain AVA, Los Carneros AVA, Mt. Veeder AVA, Coombsville AVA, Oak Knoll District of Napa Valley AVA, Oakville AVA, Spring Mountain District AVA, St. Helena AVA, Stags Leap District AVA, Wild Horse Valley AVA, Yountville AVA
- Growing season: 277 days
- Climate region: Region III
- Heat units: 3,389 GDD units
- Precipitation (annual average): 20 to 50 inches (508–1,270 mm)
- Soil conditions: Poorly drained loams, silt loams, and clay loams on floodplains, alluvial fans, and terraces
- Total area: 6,650 acres (10.4 sq mi)
- Size of planted vineyards: 4,371 acres (1,769 ha)
- No. of vineyards: 31+
- Varietals produced: Cabernet Franc, Cabernet Sauvignon, Chardonnay, Malbec, Merlot, Nebbiolo, Petit Verdot, Petite Sirah, Pinot noir, Sangiovese, Sauvignon blanc, Syrah, Zinfandel
- No. of wineries: 34+

Rutherford is an American Viticultural Area (AVA) located in Napa County, California within the Napa Valley landform centered around the town of Rutherford. The wine appellation was established as the nation's 122^{nd}, the state's 71^{st} and county's eleventh AVA on July 2, 1993 by the Bureau of Alcohol, Tobacco and Firearms (ATF), Treasury after reviewing the petition submitted by the Rutherford and Oakville Appellation Committee, on behalf of local vintners and growers, proposing a viticultural area in Napa County to be known as "Rutherford."

The Rutherford and Oakville Appellation Committee was composed of seven wineries and seven grape growers in the adjacent areas petitioned both to be established which ATF ruled on the same day. Rutherford, the seventh sub-appellation designated within Napa Valley AVA, is known for its unique terroir particularly with its Cabernet Sauvignon. The well-drained soil of this area is composition of gravel, loam and sand with volcanic deposits and marine sediments from the Franciscan Assemblage. The appellation accounts for only 6,650 acres (10.4 sq mi) in the center the valley, but has been home to some of the regions most historic wineries such as Beaulieu Vineyards, Rutherford Hill, Raymond Vineyards, and Inglenook Winery.

Because the village of Rutherford is not an incorporated township, there are no municipal boundaries on which to rely in delimiting this area. Consequently, the petitioners to a great extent utilized commercial and public sector uses of the community name in establishing the boundaries of the Rutherford viticultural area. The Rutherford Crossroads and the Rutherford Post Office are the most notable examples of the name's use within the area. At the outset, there were three wineries whose brand names refer directly to Rutherford-Rutherford Hill, Rutherford Vintners and Round Hill Winery's Rutherford Ranch Brand. All three wineries are located in the Rutherford viticultural area. Postal and telephone service areas are less relevant in terms of precise boundaries for the area but do attest to consumer recognition of Rutherford as s distinct and separate community.

== History ==
The name "Rutherford" has been associated with the area between St. Helena and Oakville in the Napa Valley for over 100 years. From the mid-nineteenth through the early twentieth centuries, Rutherford moved from an unnamed region with an unknown reputation to become a settled and integral part of Napa County and of the Napa Valley wine industry. Wine writers as early as the 1880s wrote highly of wines from the Rutherford area, including those of Gustave Niebaum, founder of Inglenook Winery. In 1838 George Yount arrived in the area now called Yountville and planted his first grapes in the 1850s. His vineyard is reported to be the first planted in Napa County. In 1864, Yount gave 1,040 acres (420 ha) of land to his granddaughter, Elizabeth (Yount) Rutherford and her husband Thomas. According to historian John Wichels, "The settlement surrounding this ranch was thereafter known as Rutherford." The southern border of the ranch runs from Silverado Trail to the Napa River along a straight line which incorporates what is now Skellenger Lane. That lane and the Rutherfords' southern property line is used to define part of the southern border of the Rutherford viticultural area.
From 1850 to 1880, Rutherford steadily increased in prominence as a community center. One reason for its emergence was the establishment of the rail system from Napa to Calistoga in 1868. Geographer William Ketteringham writes, "With the completion of the [railroad) line in 1868 other settlements along the line such as Rutherford and Oakville sprang up." The Rutherford Post Office was established in 1871 and the Rutherford voting precinct was established in 1884. During the 1870s and early 1880s, there was rapid expansion in the number of vineyard plantings and wine production. The cellars of E.B. Smith and Charles Krug (which eventually became those of Niebaum) produced 76,000 gallons. Following the wine boom of the 1870s and early 1880s, Napa Valley wineries suffered a significant setback as phylloxera set in. Vineyard plantings decreased 83 percent over a ten-year period, from 18,177 acres (7,356 ha) in 1890 to 3,000 acres (1,200 ha) in 1900. This period was followed by Prohibition from 1919 to 1933. Surprisingly, planted acreage during Prohibition increased in Napa Valley to keep pace with the burgeoning demand for grapes used to make medicinal, sacramental and home wines, which remained legal. After Prohibition, planted acreage in Napa County remained at around 10,000 acres (4,000 ha) through the 1960s. Not until the wine renaissance of the 1970s was the acreage total of 1890 surpassed. Although the period after Prohibition until the early 1970s was relatively stagnant in the wine sector, the community of Rutherford in particular continued to bolster its reputation for quality grapes and wine. Throughout these years, Beaulieu and Inglenook were regular award winners at the California State Fair. Inglenook owner John Daniel Jr. prided himself on the fact that all of Inglenook's grapes were estate grown on its vineyards In Rutherford, with the sole exception of Daniel's Napa Nook Ranch located south of the Oakville area on land now owned by the John Daniel Society in Yountville.

== Terroir ==
=== Topography ===
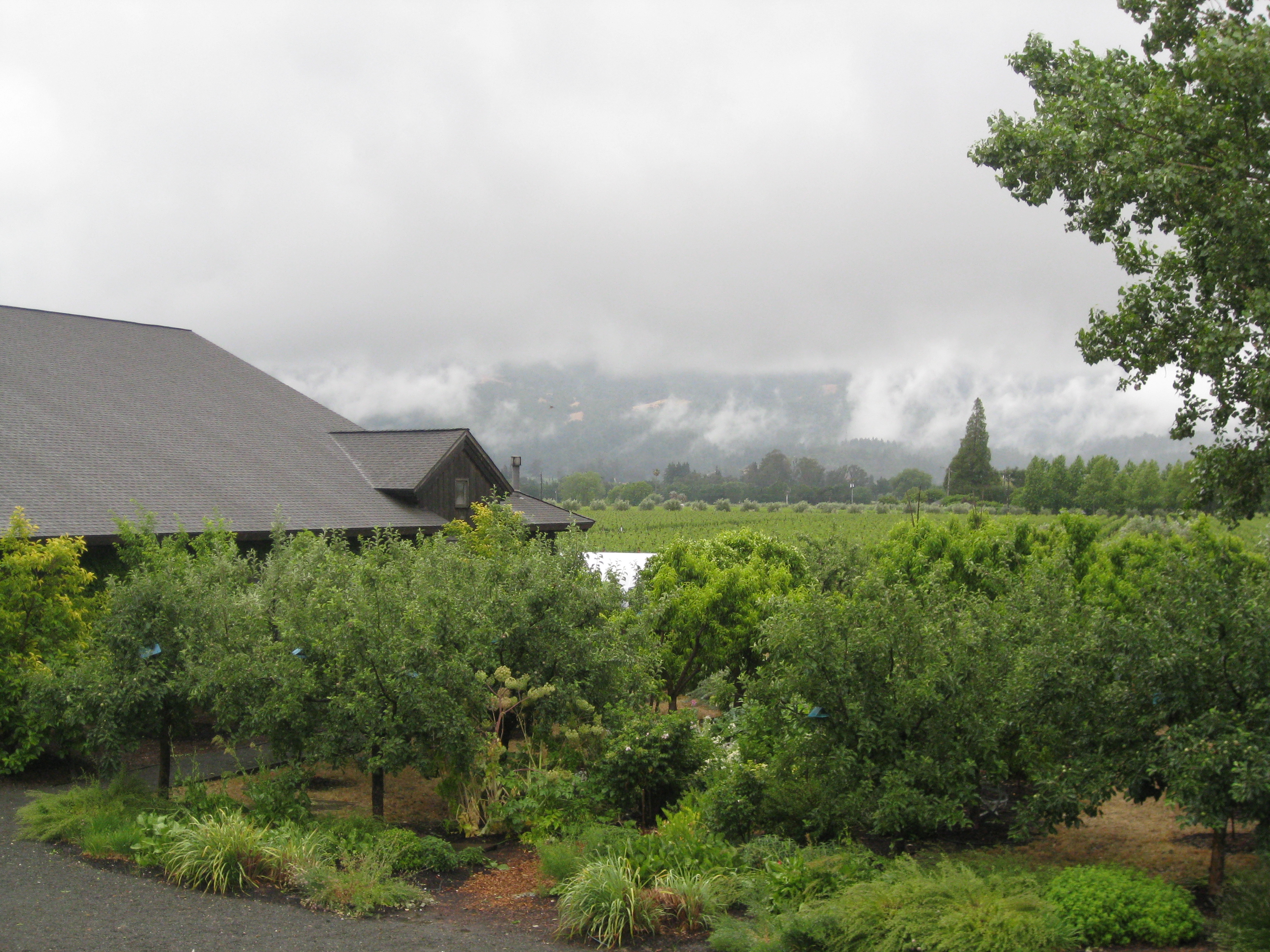
Vineyards at Frog's Leap Winery in Rutherford

Napa Valley can be divided into a group of distinct topographical areas: the lowland Napa River valley between the Mayacamas and Vaca Ranges; the mountains themselves; and the intermontane, eastern portions of the county beyond the watershed of the Napa River. The elevational differences and relief between these areas are pronounced and influence all aspects of the region's physical geography (climate, geomorphology, hydrology, soils and vegetation). The floor of the Napa Valley is 25 miles (40 km) in length south to north and between one and four miles (1.6 and 6.4 km) wide. Traversing the entire length of the valley is the Napa River, which commences north of Calistoga and-drains into San Pablo Bay. Along its course through the valley, the river elevation drops from around 380 feet (120 m) near the city of Calistoga to around 20 feet (6.1 m) near the city of Napa. The gently sloping valley floor, however, is interrupted by numerous bedrock outcrops which form isolated bench hills, hence, the Rutherford and Oakville Benches. In other places, the valley floor features broad alluvial fans extending toward the center of the valley from mountain streams which serve as tributaries to the Napa River.
Two fundamental geographic distinctions within Napa Valley are particularly relevant to the delimitation of the Rutherford viticultural area: on the east–west axis, mountain versus valley floor, delineating the valley floor viticultural environments; and on the north–south axis, climatic differences as the result of a decreasing incursion of maritime air into the valley. These distinctions can be integrated with the community identity of Rutherford (and the other communities of Napa Valley) to provide consumers with meaningful and distinctive reference points concerning the viticulture of Napa Valley. From the perspective of a wine consumer, such basic geographic distinctions offer a useful introduction to the complexity of viticulture in Napa Valley.

=== Geology ===
Geological history is an important factor in shaping Napa Valley viticultural environments. Napa Valley is largely a synclinal (down-folded) valley of Cenozoic age. Faulting (accompanied by minor folding) throughout the valley later resulted in the formation of bedrock "islands" (outcrops) across the valley floor. These rock islands have been modified during the last million years through erosion by the Napa River, its tributaries and other erosional slope processes. Sections of the old Napa River channel are still visible here and there in the valley, including in several places within the Rutherford viticultural area. In this central portion of the valley, much of the old river channel and its alluvial sediments have been buried by more recent Napa River floodplain sediments, but they principally have been covered by alluvial fans emerging from the mountain streams on the western and eastern sides of the valley. The age and size of these fan surfaces are a function of climatic change, basin lithology (mineral composition and structure of rocks), and basin size, all of which vary among the four major drainage basins in the Rutherford and Oakville areas, accounting for differences in these fan surfaces. The northern fans (in the Rutherford area) are the larger geomorphic features, have more significantly controlled the course of the Napa River through time, and are geologically more diverse.

=== Climate ===
The major climatic difference between the watershed area of Napa Valley and the outlying valleys is the maritime nature of the former. Whereas the valley as defined by the watershed area is classified as a coastal valley, the outlying valleys are considered interior or inland valleys, representing a different climatic type. This is well evidenced by the vegetation, the distribution of which is primarily controlled by climate. Moderate to high elevations in the interior valleys are covered by chamise chaparral and other plant communities tolerant of summer drought and heat. At these same elevations in the Napa Valley river drainage, mixed forests of douglas fir, oak, madrone and coastal redwood dominate. Bedrock geology and soils act as secondary influences controlling these vegetation distributions. Higher elevation and mountainous regions within Napa Valley experience shorter growing seasons (though they may extend longer into early autumn), fewer degree days, lower daily maximum temperatures during the growing season, less fog, increased solar radiation and increased precipitation. These conditions affect the time of wine grape harvest. In the mountainous areas, desirable acid-sugar levels often are reached much after the harvest on the valley floor. In some mountain settings, with small intermontane basins, local cold air drainage may result in marginal conditions for wine grape production. Along the valley floor from Napa to Calistoga, there are pronounced mesoclimatic variations which relate to the penetration of marine influences from San Pablo Bay and, to a lesser extent, to the rise in elevation as one proceeds up valley. A mesoclimate is a subdivision of a macroclimate, California's Mediterranean climate is considered a macroclimate. Napa Valley's mesoclimates refer to modifications of this macroclimate due to altitude/elevation or distance from the nearest ocean. Because of the diminution of marine influences as one travels up valley, the northern regions of the valley are characterized by much warmer summers and significantly colder and wetter winters than in the south. That is, summer temperatures and total precipitation increase as one travels north. Summer days down valley often are cool, foggy and breezy. The fog usually dissipates early in the day, clearing first to the north and progressing southward to the bay. Altitudinal variation also affects temperature distribution. The lower, southern troughs of the valley experience the lowest winter temperatures along the valley floor. As the elevation rises up valley, temperatures also rise, between 1.5 and 2.8 °F (−16.9 and −16.2 °C) for each 500 feet. As a result of these mesoclimatic trends along the valley floor, wine writers often speak of different climate regions within Napa Valley. The following excerpt from William Massee's Guide to the Wines of America is illustrative of the association of community names with mesoclimatic variations in Napa Valley. In the Caneros area there is a tempering influence from the northern round of San Pablo Bay, a receptacle for rivers-the Sacramento and San Joaquin, the Petaluma and Napa-and many creeks. Cool air currents sweep down from the mountain and in from the ocean, bringing fog. It is a cool Region One. Around Yountville, it is about one and a half-you can often see the fog line in the morning that marks the difference. Near Oakville, it is a cool Region Two, where Beaulieu grows its Johannisberg Riesling, up behind Bob Mondavi. Rutherford is a solid Region Two but it is warmer in Vineyard No. 3. to the east, because it gets the late sun. Up around Calistoga, it is Region Three.
The Rutherford viticultural area is warmer than the area around Oakville to the south and cooler than the St. Helena area to the north. The incursion of fog is also less pronounced in the Rutherford area than in the Oakville area. Within this general mesoclimatic context, local relief or topoclimate is significant in determining diurnal temperature pattern within the Rutherford viticultural area. Topoclimate refers to a subdivision of mesoclimates influenced by topography, which may be elevational, topographic blocking by a barrier, or a change in slope or aspect. In sum, as opposed to some mountain settings of Napa Valley, this part of the central portion of the valley floor offers the type of climatic conditions necessary for the production of a wide variety of wine grapes. Considerable acreage is planted to several varieties, including Cabernet Sauvignon, Chardonnay, Sauvignon Blanc, among others, throughout this region. The plant hardiness zone is 9b.

=== Soils ===
The occurrence of specific soil types can be related to topography in Napa Valley, as topography is one of the five variables that controls soil formation. The Soil Survey of Napa County, California [hereinafter Soil Survey], published by the U.S. Department of Agriculture Soil Conservation Service in 1978, divides the 11 soil associations of Napa County into two general categories: lowland depositional soils, which account for four of the 11 soil associations and are found on alluvial fans, floodplains, valleys and terraces; and upland residual soils, which account for the remaining seven soil associations, and are found on bedrock and colluvially-mantled slopes. The General Soil Map from the Soil Survey shows the location of these upland and lowland soils. This map as well as the text of the Soil Survey show that the lowland-upland soil break occurs at around the 500-foot (150 m) elevation. This same elevation line, with minor exceptions, has been used to differentiate the Rutherford viticultural area from the mountains to the east and west. According to the petitioners, soils and geomorphic mapping should go hand in hand, as soils usually are mapped according to geomorphic surfaces or units. Within the valley floor area of Napa Valley, there are both alluvial fans and river deposits. The petitioners state that the size and location of these fans, their (dis)similarity in terms of geologic parent material and soils, and the course of the Napa River and other drainage systems can help to establish viticultural area boundaries on the valley floor. For example, north of Rutherford is a massive fan emanating from the Sulphur Canyon drainage system in the Mayacamas Range. This fan sweeps across the valley floor in St. Helena from west to east and lies generally north of Zinfandel Lane. Pleasanton loam soils predominate. The Rutherford and Conn Creek fans south of Zinfandel Lane push against the Sulphur Canyon fan from the south. Although the point of convergence of these three fans does not lie along a straight line, Zinfandel Lane does serve to separate these areas and therefore provides a good northern boundary for the Rutherford viticultural area. As one proceeds down Napa Valley, Zinfandel Lane also marks the widening of the valley floor, which continues until the appearance of the Yountville Hills at the southern end of Oakville.
