= Yountville Hills =

- Location within California Location within the United States

Highest point
- Elevation: 149 m (489 ft)

Geography
- Country: United States
- State: California
- District: Napa County
- Range coordinates: 38°25′12.679″N 122°22′34.920″W
- Topo map: USGS Rutherford

The Yountville Hills are a mountain range in Napa County, California on the northwest side of the town of Yountville. The West Napa Fault extends into the Yountville Hills, as mapped in 2005.
