= John Patchett =

American winemaker

- Born: 1797; Lincolnshire, England
- Died: August 13, 1876 (aged 78–79); Napa, California
- Known for: Planting first commercial vineyard in the Napa Valley; Building the first wine cellar in Napa Valley

John Patchett (1797–1876) was the first person to plant a commercial vineyard and build a commercial wine cellar in the Napa Valley in California. Patchett planted his vineyard in 1854 and started making wine in 1857. Patchett established his winery in Napa in 1858.

== Biography ==
Patchett was born in Lincolnshire, England, in 1797 and immigrated to the United States when he was 20 years old. He trained as a brewmaster in Pennsylvania, but was not able to find work. He met and married his wife Esther Passmore there in 1820, and took up farming, moving west first to Ohio, then Illinois and then Iowa. In 1850, the Patchetts were lured by the California Gold Rush and moved to Hangtown which is now known as Placerville, California. He began mining for gold in the fall of 1850 and his wife Esther died in November of that year.

== Winemaking and time in Napa Valley ==
Patchett visited the Napa Valley in 1852, and soon began to purchase land in Napa. His first acquisition was 16 acres and his holdings eventually reached 200 acres. Patchett hired Charles Krug in 1858 as his winemaker. Patchett married twice more after moving to Napa. His second wife Susannah Quant died in 1862, and he married Martha Bradshaw in 1865. Patchett died on August 13, 1876, and is buried in the family plot in Tulocay Cemetery in Napa.
