= Charles Krug =

American winemaker

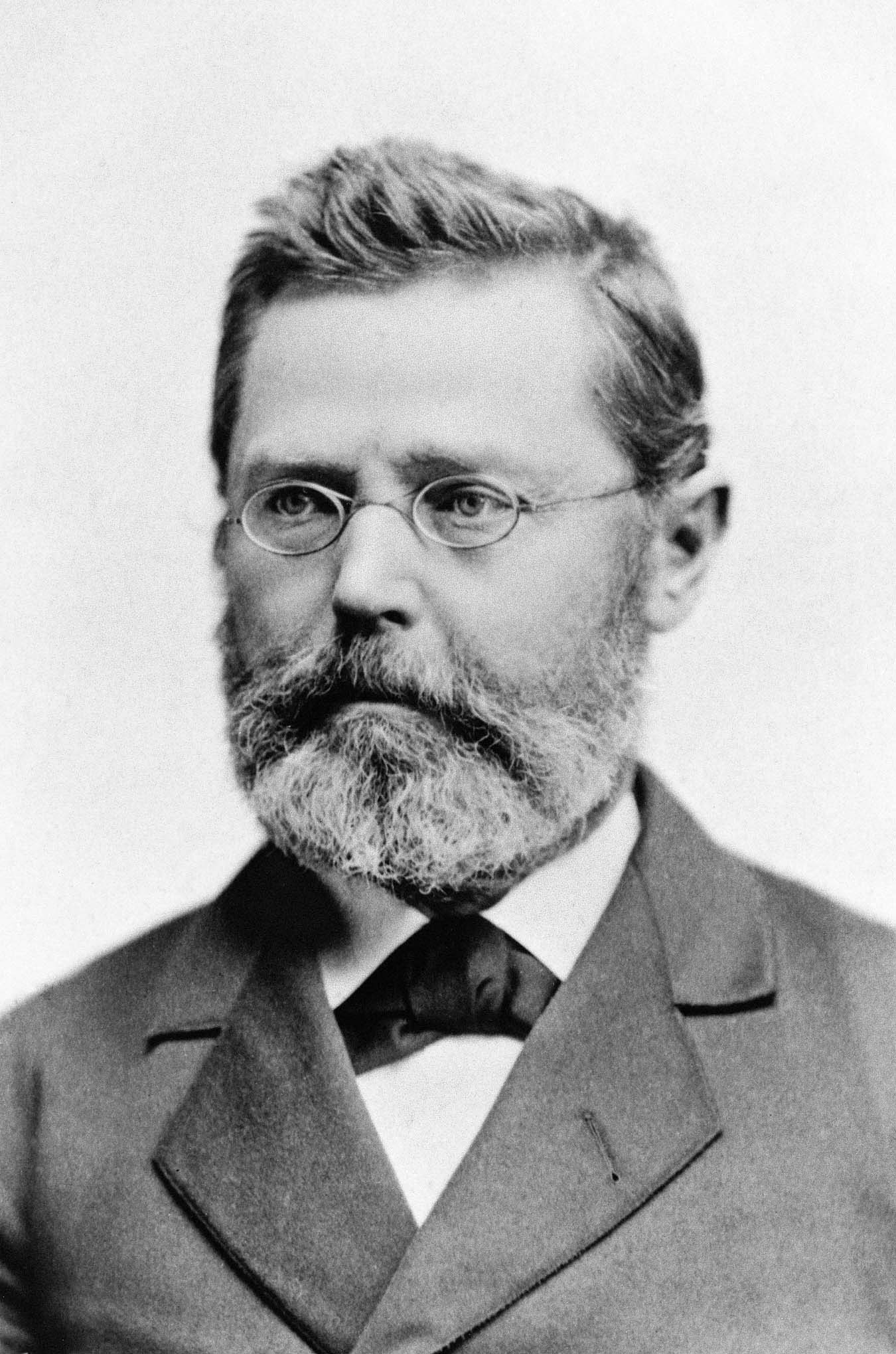
- Charles Krug
- Born: 1 March 1825; Trendelburg, Kassel, Hessen, Germany
- Died: 31 October 1892 (aged 67); St. Helena, Napa, California, United States
- Occupations: best known as a winemaker, was editor of Staats Zeitung (German newspaper in SF), Staff Member at Free Thinker's School (Philadelphia), Gold Refiner at SF Mint
- Known for: Founded the second commercial winery in the Napa Valley

Charles Krug (1825–1892) was among the pioneers of winemaking in the Napa Valley, California, and was the founder of the Charles Krug Winery.

== Biography ==
Charles Krug visited the United States from Prussia in 1847, and became a citizen in 1852. In 1851 he served as an apprentice winemaker for Agoston Haraszthy and then John Patchett before establishing his own winery. Krug married Carolina Bale, the daughter of early Napa Valley pioneer and miller Edward Turner Bale and granddaughter of María Isidora Vallejo of the prominent Californio Vallejo family, on December 26, 1860.

Krug was inducted into the Culinary Institute of America's Vintner's Hall of Fame in 2007.

== Winemaking ==
The dowry Bale left for her included 540 acres (0.84 sq mi) of land north of St. Helena, California, on which Krug planted a vineyard and founded his winery in 1861. Charles Krug introduced innovative ideas in winemaking to California. He began making wine using a cider press for pressing, carefully selected rootstocks, varietals and vineyard sites. The knowledge he gained and shared benefited the young California wine industry.

== Charles Krug Winery ==
Following Krug's death, James Moffitt Sr. purchased the winery in 1894. In 1943, Robert Mondavi persuaded his parents, Cesare and Rosa Mondavi, to purchase the inactive winery from Moffitt for $75,000. Robert Mondavi began his wine career there, until he founded his own winery in 1966. The winery still exists, and is owned by Robert's younger brother Peter Mondavi's family.
