= Crystal Springs of Napa Valley AVA =

Appellation that designates wine in Napa County, California

Coordinates: 38°33′34″N 122°28′24″W

Crystal Springs of Napa Valley
- Wine region
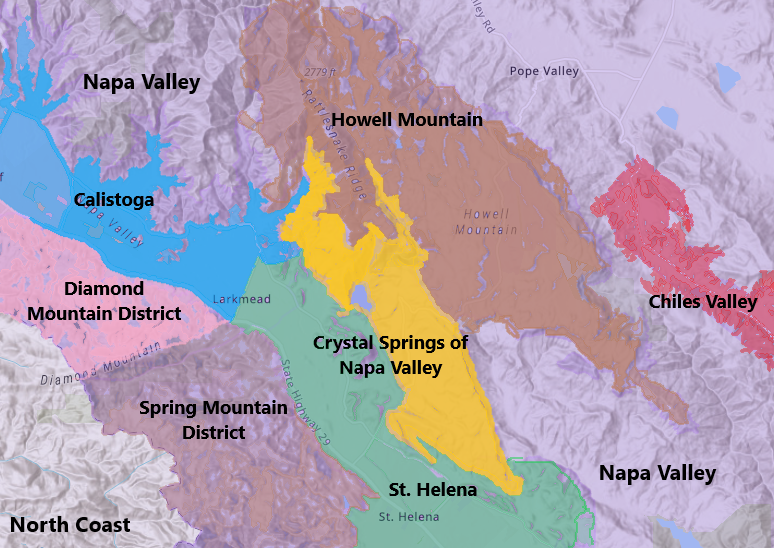
- Type: American Viticultural Area
- Year established: 2024
- Years of wine industry: 156
- Country: United States
- Part of: California, North Coast AVA, Napa County, Napa Valley AVA
- Other regions in California, North Coast AVA, Napa County, Napa Valley AVA: Atlas Peak AVA, Calistoga AVA, Chiles Valley AVA,Coombsville AVA, Diamond Mountain District AVA, Howell Mountain AVA, Los Carneros AVA, Mt. Veeder AVA, Oakville AVA, Rutherford AVA, Spring Mountain District AVA, St. Helena AVA, Stags Leap District AVA Oak Knoll District of Napa Valley AVA, Wild Horse Valley AVA, Yountville AVA
- Soil conditions: Weathered and eroded igneous, metamorphic and sedimentary rocks made of tuff
- Total area: 4,117 acres (6.4 sq mi)
- Size of planted vineyards: 230 acres (93 ha)
- No. of vineyards: 30
- Grapes produced: Cabernet Sauvignon, Cabernet Franc, Malbec, Merlot, Sauvignon Blanc

Crystal Springs of Napa Valley is an American Viticultural Area (AVA) located in Napa County, California within the boundaries of the prestigious Napa Valley AVA. The 4,117-acre (6.4 sq mi) wine appellation was established as the nation's 275^{th}, the state's 154^{th} and the county's nineteenth AVA on November 16, 2024 by the Alcohol and Tobacco Tax and Trade Bureau (TTB), Treasury after reviewing the petition submitted by Steven Burgess, president of Burgess Cellars, Inc., on behalf of local vineyard owners and winemakers proposing the viticultural area named "Crystal Springs of Napa Valley."

Crystal Springs is the seventeenth viticultural area established in the 120,000-acre (188 sq mi), 40-year-old, world-renowned Napa Valley that lies within the expansive multi-county North Coast appellation. Crystal Springs does not overlap with any of the adjacent viticultural areas. TTB modified the proposed Crystal Springs and the existing Calistoga AVA boundaries responding to comments received during the petition review period. To accommodate an existing vineyard whose terroir matches the proposed AVA, approximately 11 acres (4 ha) of the Crystal Springs Vineyard, previously within the Calistoga AVA, and its remaining 6 acres (2 ha) were placed entirely within the Crystal Springs appellation boundaries. The comment noted the vineyard's name denotes association with "Crystal Springs" and shares a similar climate, hillside topography and soils of the AVA. The vineyard elevations are between 500 and 1,200 feet (152–366 m), which is within Crystal Springs' range of elevations above the floor of the Calistoga Valley and below the 1,400 feet (427 m) mountainous levels of the adjacent Howell Mountain AVA. At TTB's announcement, Crystal Springs encompasses only 4,117 acres (6.4 sq mi), with 30 vineyards cultivating about 230 acres (93 ha), making it one of the smallest AVA in the country.

== Name Evidence ==
Crystal Springs of Napa Valley is locally referred to simply as "Crystal Springs." The petitioner added the phrase "of Napa Valley" to distinguish the viticultural area from the numerous locations in the United States that are also named "Crystal Springs." The appellation gets its name from the dozens of crystal springs in local hillsides and describes the west-facing slopes of the Vaca Range from Mount Saint Helena to Soda Springs. In the 1870s, the Crystal Springs Rural Health Retreat, a Seventh-day Adventist undertaking, was founded and built by Dr. John Kellogg and others in the St. Helena locale as a sanitarium promoting various types of water treatments. The modern hospital, Adventist Health St. Helena, currently sits on the former sanitarium property on which Crystal Springs Resort still stands. One of the buildings on the hospital campus is named Crystal Springs Manor.

The petition also included several additional examples of current use of the term "Crystal Springs" within the area. For example, Crystal Springs Road and North Fork Crystal Springs Road both run through the region. Also, the Crystal Springs Vineyard is resident in the AVA. An article about biking in the region lists the "Silverado–Howell Mountain–Crystal Springs–Franz Valley–Ida Clayton" route. A 2016 article in the Napa Valley Register about a conflict between residents in the proposed AVA and the owner of a winery was titled, "Crystal Springs neighbors trying to stop Woodbridge's winery project". Finally, a real estate video for an estate in the proposed AVA is titled "North Crystal Springs Estate, Napa Valley".

== History ==
Viticulture in the Crystal Springs region goes back to circa 1870s. 1884 was when the Rossinis purchased the property that became Souverain, and is now Burgess Cellars. Albino Pestoni immigrated from a small Swiss village and established a vineyard in the 1898 and currently many vintners are sourcing fruits from the Crystal Springs area. The Crystal Springs region was the origin of the 2020 Glass Fire.

== Terroir ==
=== Topography ===
The distinguishing feature of the Crystal Springs viticultural area in Napa Valley is its topography. The petition describes the AVA as an "all hillside" region with no flat areas or natural lakes exist along the western face of the Vaca Range. However, being hillside, there are springs and seasonal creeks as well as drainages. Slopes are generally west-to-southwesterly facing, and slope angles range from 15 to 40 percent. Elevations range from 400 to 1,400 ft (122–427 m). According to the petition, the reason for limiting the AVA to this range of elevations is that the 400 ft (122 m) contour marks the transition point between the foothills of the Vaca Range and the floor of the Napa Valley. Additionally, the 1,400 ft (427 m) contour along the northern boundary of the AVA coincides with the southern boundary of the established Howell Mountain AVA. To the north of the AVA, the elevations rise up to 2,200 ft (671 m) within the established Howell Mountain AVA. The topography of the Howell Mountain AVA contains hillsides, like Crystal Springs of Napa Valley AVA, but also has a rolling, plateau-like feature at the summit. The region to the east of the AVA has elevation similar to those of the AVA, but the slopes have a more easterly-to-northeasterly exposure. South and west of the AVA are the established St. Helena and Calistoga AVAs, which have lower elevations and include the flat lands along the floor of the Napa Valley. The petition describes slope angles within the established St. Helena AVA as mostly less than 5 percent, while the established Calistoga AVA is described as having "a multitude of slopes, from steep mountains to benchlands to fans, to flat valley floors to riparian habitats." According to the petition, the topography of the Crystal Springs of Napa Valley AVA has a major effect on viticulture. For instance, the western and southwestern aspects of the viticultural area slopes receive larger amounts of solar radiation than slopes with northern or eastern aspects, allowing grapes to mature easily each growing season. Additionally, the petition states that the soils within the AVA are shallower than the soils in the neighboring valleys because natural weathering processes have moved the soils downhill and into the valleys.

Crystal Springs of Napa Valley AVA now officially describes most of the lower elevations of the Howell Mountains, from 400 to 1,400 ft (120–430 m), while the elevated area above is the Howell Mountain AVA. Below 400 ft (120 m) to the valley floor defines the Calistoga and St Helena AVAs.

=== Geology ===
The Vaca Range in Crystal Springs is volcanic in origin. From the palisades made of igneous rocks, to metamorphic and sedimentary rocks made of tuff. Some areas also have obsidian and red volcanics.

=== Climate ===
The most significant effect of topography is on the climate of the Crystal Springs. The topography contributes to the AVA's frost-free and reliable growing period. First, the cold air does not remain on its hillsides. Instead, cold air flows downhill and pools in the lower elevations on the floor of the Napa Valley in the neighboring St. Helena and Calistoga AVAs, making frost more common in those regions. Due to the frost threat on the valley floor and higher elevations, vineyards within the affected Calistoga, St. Helena and Howell Mountain AVAs require frost protection measures such as orchard fans, heaters, sprinklers, or misters. By contrast, vineyards in the Crystal Springs AVA do not require frost protection. Additionally, since elevations within Crystal Springs are below 1,400 ft (427 m), the region is not as susceptible to frost caused by adiabatic cooling, also known as elevation cooling. According to the petition, adiabatic cooling can lower temperatures by 3 to 6 °F (−16 to −14 °C) per 1,000 ft (300 m) of elevation. As a result, higher elevations in the adjacent Howell Mountain viticultural area have a higher risk for damaging frosts. In fact, the petition notes that the use of frost protection measures in Howell Mountain vineyards commonly extends into June. By contrast, Crystal Springs of Napa Valley does not have frost concerns during its bud break period.

=== Soil ===
Weathering and erosion over millions of years has left little top soil, therefore exposed rocks including parent material are common. Uplifting and weathering has made the available soils quite varied even within a parcel. Soils are important, but they are tertiary concern compared to climate, exposure and slope in viticulture. The hills are covered mostly with drought-tolerant species such as oaks, chaparral, ghost pines and manzanita.

== Viticulture ==
Topography is the key distinguishing feature of Crystal Springs of Napa Valley according to the submitted petition. It sits adjacent to the borders of St. Helena and Calistoga AVAs and in the foothills below Howell Mountain. Vineyards here are often mistaken for being located within the Howell Mountain AVA where its elevation boundary starts at the 1,400 ft (427 m) contour above the maritime fogline, whereas Crystal Springs' vineyards lie below that contour level and are often shrouded in fog, which makes a crucial difference in a wine's flavor profile.

The most famous winery in Crystal Springs is the 40-year-old Viader whose founding winemaker, Delia Viader, said she doesn't need the new AVA designation because her brand has already been established with the Napa Valley label. Julien Fayard makes a Cabernet Sauvignon-based blend from the new AVA for Somnium Vineyard, founded by race-car driver Danica Patrick, and a single-vineyard Merlot for Brion, a much smaller winery. "It's a very rough area with a lot of volcanic rock. It's very steep," Fayard told Wine-Searcher. "Not a lot of vegetation. The cooling effect really helps. Cabernet Sauvignon is mostly what is planted, but Somnium is planted with a large amount of Cabernet Franc, almost 30 percent."

Salvestrin is the only winery to date to make a wine with "Crystal Springs" on the label. For several years it made a Sauvignon Blanc from Crystal Springs Vineyard and the last vintage of that wine was in 2021. The vineyard was sold and Salvestrin lost its lease on it, so the winery transitioned to making a Napa Valley AVA Sauvignon Blanc. "There's lots of water in that region. Good wells, good water," Richard Salvestrin told Wine-Searcher. "The property that we farmed had the spring called Crystal Spring on it. There was definitely some wind that would develop based on the hillside flow. It got shading and afternoon breezes. That was great for the Sauvignon Blanc." Viader raises a valid point about how much the new AVA will matter. Previously wines from within the valley's undesignated areas were branded as Napa Valley AVA, which is the most valuable AVA name in the nation. Will Crystal Springs of Napa Valley boost the local vineyards' reputation?

Napa Valley itself received AVA status more than 40 years ago, in 1981, and today it encompasses 17 official sub-zones, or "nested" AVAs. The Crystal Springs appellation, located in the foothills of Howell Mountain, is Napa Valley's newest AVA in 13 years when Coombsville was the previous AVA addition established in 2011.

The new AVA can finally help consumers understand what distinguishes Crystal Springs wines from others in Napa Valley, Steven Burgess explains. It could also command higher bottle prices. Burgess described Crystal Springs wines, mostly Cabernet Sauvignon, as having "extremely dark, complex flavors and rich aromatics." "The recognition of our sites with a formal AVA would make us proud and satisfied," said Burgess, who authored the petition of the application for Crystal Springs of Napa Valley submitted to the TTB. "Our choices to be hillside vintners where expenses are higher, [and] yields are lower would be recognised," he told Decanter.
