= Yountville AVA =

American Viticultural Area in Napa County, California

Coordinates: 38°24′13″N 122°21′45″W

Yountville
- Wine region
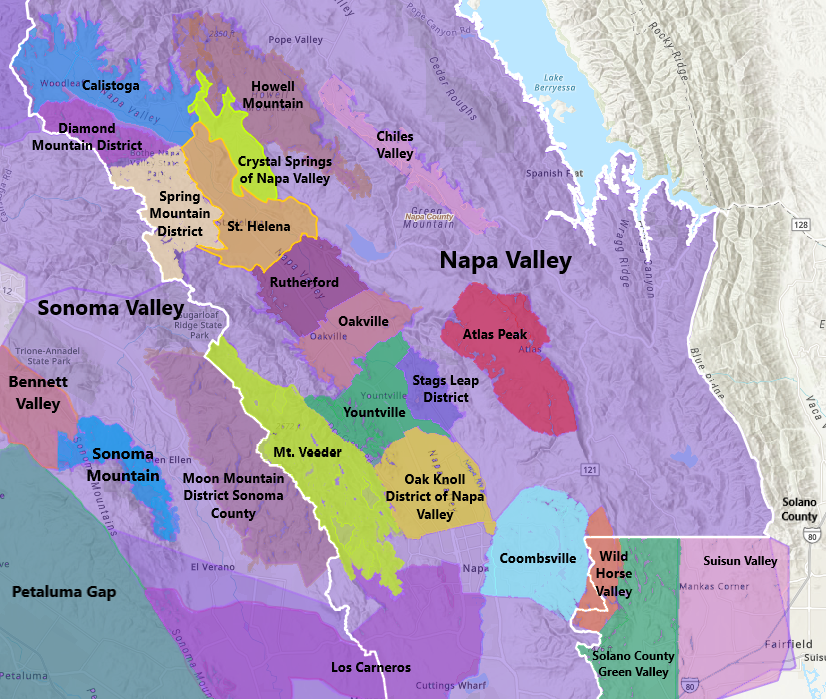
- Napa Valley AVAs
- Type: American Viticultural Area
- Year established: 1999
- Country: United States
- Part of: California, North Coast AVA, Napa County, Napa Valley AVA
- Other regions in California, North Coast AVA, Napa County, Napa Valley AVA: Atlas Peak AVA, Calistoga AVA, Chiles Valley AVA, Crystal Springs of Napa Valley AVA, Diamond Mountain District AVA, Howell Mountain AVA, Los Carneros AVA, Mt. Veeder AVA, Coombsville AVA Oak Knoll District of Napa Valley AVA, Oakville AVA, Rutherford AVA, Spring Mountain District AVA, St. Helena AVA, Stags Leap District AVA, Wild Horse Valley AVA
- Growing season: 249 days
- Climate region: Region II
- Heat units: 2,600-2,900 GDD units
- Precipitation (annual average): 26 inches (660 mm)
- Soil conditions: Gravelly silt-loam, alluvial clays, clay and loam deposits
- Total area: 8,260 acres (13 sq mi)
- Size of planted vineyards: 4,000 acres (1,619 ha)
- No. of vineyards: 100
- Grapes produced: Cabernet Franc, Cabernet Sauvignon, Carignan, Chardonnay, Malbec, Merlot, Petit Verdot, Petite Sirah, Pinot Blanc, Pinot Noir, Sauvignon Blanc, Sauvignon Musqué, Semillon, Syrah/Shiraz
- No. of wineries: 34

Yountville (//ˈjʌntˌvɪl// YONT-vil) is an American Viticultural Area (AVA) located in Napa County, California centered around the town of Yountville. It was established as the nation's 137^{th}, the state's 83^{rd} and the county's fourteenth appellation on March 19, 1999 by the Bureau of Alcohol, Tobacco and Firearms (ATF), Treasury after reviewing the petition submitted by Mr. Richard Mendelson, on behalf of a number of wineries and grape growers in the locale proposing a new Napa Valley viticultural area known as "Yountville."

The viticultural area is located entirely within the Napa Valley appellation encompassing approximately 8,260 acres (13 sq mi), of which 3,500 acres (1,416 ha) were cultivated at the outset. The viticultural area was determined by extending the wine growing area from around the town of Yountville until it abuts the previously established viticultural areas of Oakville on the north, Stags Leap District on the east, and Mt. Veeder on the west. To the south is an area called Oak Knoll which was petitioned and designated a viticultural area in 2004. The town's founder George Calvert Yount planted the first vineyard in the region around 1836. The appellation is one of Napa Valley's coolest climate which helps contribute to its long growing season. It is particularly known for its very tannic Cabernet Sauvignon varietal wines that have the capability of aging well in the bottle.

== History ==
The history of viticulture in the Napa Valley begins with George C. Yount. Yount first settled the Napa Valley in 1831. He was granted Rancho Caymus land grant by acting Governor Nicolás Gutiérrez on March 3, 1836. It amounted to approximately 11,000 acres (17 sq mi) and covered the valley and foothills from the Bale Slough in the north to a line which runs through the town of Yountville today. By the 1840's, he had established a small vineyard. In 1855, he commissioned a surveyor to lay out the city. The new community was christened Sebastopol. In 1887, two years after Yount's death, the town was renamed in honor of its founder. Yount's landholdings grew to encompass what is now valuable stretches of viticultural real estate in the Americas. Rancho Caymus, from which the modern-day Caymus Vineyard in Rutherford takes its name, covered the land now divided into Rutherford, Oakville and Yountville areas. A later acquisition, Rancho La Jota, was situated on the eastern slopes of the Howell Mountains. The modern-day La Jota winery was first established there in 1898.

== Terroir ==
=== Topography ===
The geographical features of the viticultural area set it apart from the surrounding area in the Napa Valley and produce a unique microclimate. The distinguishing features of the viticultural area are the Napa River, the Napa Valley floor, the alluvial soils, the hills north of Yountville called the Yountville Mounts and the hills west of Yountville which form the western boundary of the Napa Valley.

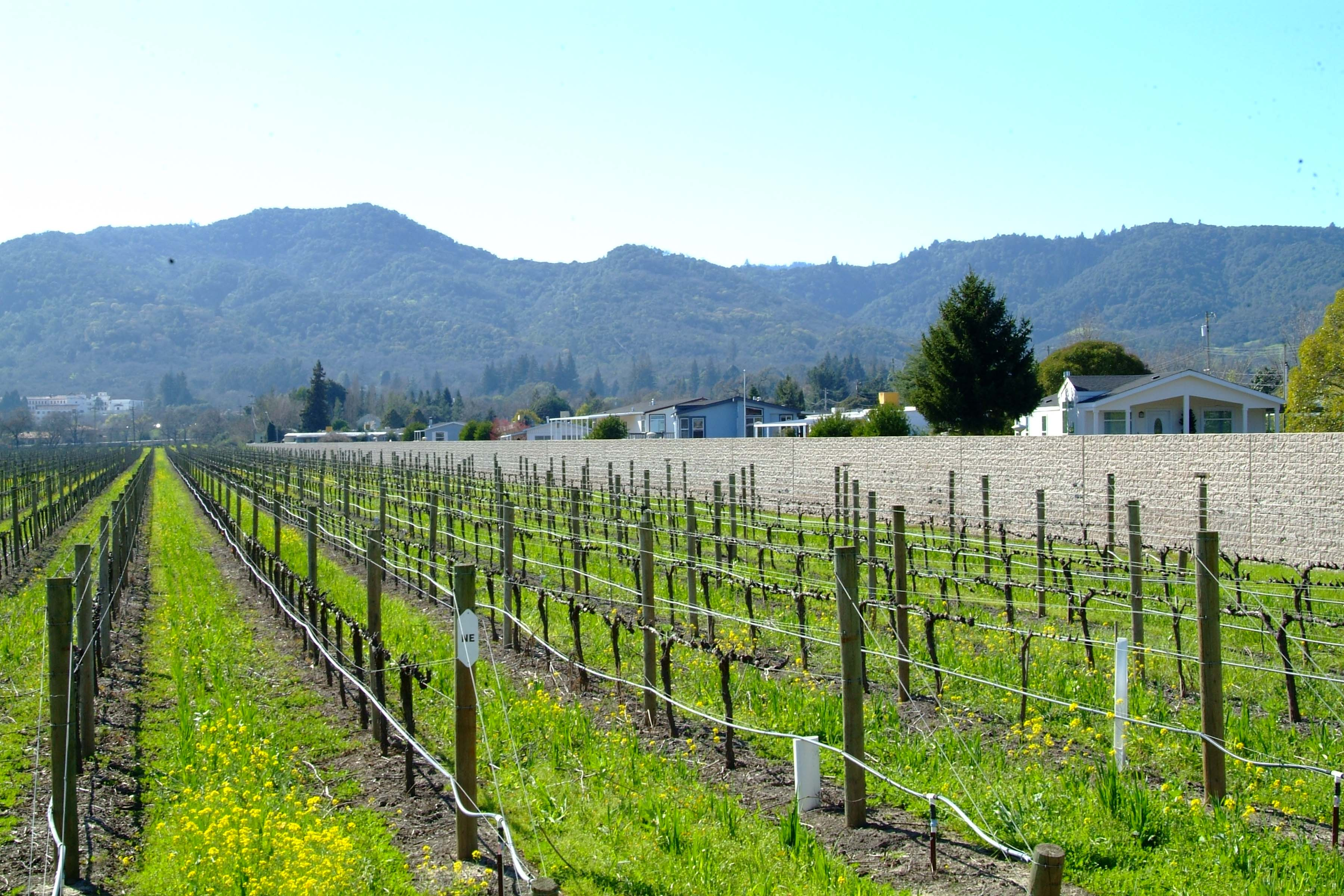
Yountville grapevines

=== Climate ===
The weather is specific to the Yountville area with cool marine air currents reaching the Yountville Mounts at its northern border which form a weather barrier to further expansion of the fogs and winds. Also the soils which form the alluvial fan just across the southern boundary of the Yountville area can be seen to come from the Dry Creek watershed. The soils just north of the Yountville border come from the hills that form the western side of the area. The line along Ragatz Lane was selected to delineate the two areas. The soils between Yountville and Stags Leap District can be seen to differ north of the Yountville crossroad with the Rector canyon being the parent and the area between the Napa River and the Silverado Trail belonging to the hills immediately to the east. The Yountville area, and specifically the area near and west of the town of Yountville, is one of the coolest vineyard regions of the Napa Valley viticultural area with long, cool growing season for grapevines. The Amerine and Winkler climate scheme rates this area as a Region II climate in a typical year, with a growing degree-day (GDD) totals of 2600 to 2900. This makes the area around the town of Yountville warmer than most of the Carneros viticultural area, but cooler than parts of Mt. Veeder and Oakville. The plant hardiness zone ranges from 9a to 9b.

=== Soils ===
The Yountville area is unusual as a Napa Valley floor viticultural region in that it is not dominated geomorphically by large alluvial fans. It is most similar geologically to the Stags Leap District, which also is dominated by an old Napa River channel. However, the Yountville area is also geologically and geomorphologically distinct from the Stags Leap District, as Yountville was an area of intense coastal deposition along what must have been a nearshore current set up on the western side of the valley. The only similar coastal deposits found in the Napa Valley are in the Hagen Road area east of the City of Napa off Olive Hill Lane. Geomorphic deposits strongly influence soil types in the regions. Pronounced differences in soils are seen between Yountville, Oakville, the Stags Leap District, Mt. Veeder, and the proposed Oak Knoll viticultural area.
