= Caymus =

Caymus may refer to:

- Caymus, California, former settlement
- Rancho Caymus, land grant
- Caymus Vineyards, Napa winery.
