= Viader =

Winery in California

Viader Vineyards & Winery
- Location: Deer Park, California, United States
- Coordinates: 38.5606°N 122.4747°W
- Appellation: Napa Valley; Crystal Springs of Napa Valley
- Founded: 1986; 40 years ago
- Key people: Delia Viader, founder Alan Viader, winemaker
- Known for: Cabernet Sauvignon
- Varietal: Combination wine consisting of a blended Cabernet Sauvignon and Cabernet Franc
- Website: viader.com

Viader Vineyards & Winery (oft spelled capitalized as VIADER) is a 96 acres (39 ha) winery located in Deer Park, California, United States at 1,400 feet of elevation. It was founded in 1986 by an Argentinian immigrant to the United States, Delia Viader, after receiving a loan from her father to start the business. The winery produces wine from mostly red grape varieties such as Cabernet sauvignon, Cabernet franc, Petit verdot, Malbec, and blends of some of these reds with one another. According to Wine Industry advisor, "96% percent of VIADER’s wines are not available to the general public", being sold instead mostly to visitors to the winery itself.

The Viader winery has been certified organic since its opening.

In 2006 Delia Viader's son, Alan Viader, became the lead winemaker running the vineyard and winery.

== Fires ==
=== 2020 Glass Fire ===
During the 2020 Glass Fire, due to undetermined cause, the Viader vineyards experienced damage to some of the vineyard's "prized old vines".

=== 2005 arsonist event ===
In 2005, the wine warehouse owned by Delia Viader was destroyed by an arsonist. This caused $4.5 million worth of damage in lost wine inventory.
