= Caymus Vineyards =

Winery in Rutherford, California, US

- Location: Rutherford, California, United States
- Coordinates: 38.469231°N 122.398617°W
- Appellation: Napa Valley
- Other labels: Conundrum, Mer Soleil, Seasun, Emmolo
- Key people: Charles Wagner -- founder Chuck Wagner -- winemaker
- Cases/yr: Caymus: 58,000; Conundrum: 120,000; Mer Soleil Silver: 20,000
- Known for: Special Selection
- Varietals: Cabernet Sauvignon, Pinot noir, Chardonnay, Zinfandel, Sauvignon blanc
- Distribution: National
- Tasting: By appointment
- Website: www.caymus.com

Caymus Vineyards is a Napa winery owned by Chuck Wagner and his family. It was named for George Yount's Rancho Caymus land grant, which in turn was named for the villages of Kaimus, the Wappo settlements previously existing in the region.

== History ==
The Wagner family has farmed the current Caymus property to wine grapes since the 1940s. Until 1972, when the winery was established, the fruit was sold to other area wineries.

The vineyard was planted to Nathan Fay's clone of Cabernet Sauvignon in the 1960s. Fay also provided grapes to Stag's Leap Wine Cellars.

In 1975, the winery hired Randy Dunn as winemaker, and offered the first vintage of their flagship wine, the Caymus Special Selection. The Special Selection is not produced every year, but only in "better years" (the last vintage of Special Selection not to be released was 1996). In 1989, the 1984 Special Selection was named Wine Spectator magazine’s “Wine of the Year.” The 1990 Special Selection received the same title in 1994, making Caymus the only winery in the world to have received the award twice. The winery makes a "regular" cabernet that is released annually.

Chuck Wagner, Charles' son, took over winemaking duties in 2015, a role which he continues to hold to this day.

== Wines ==
In addition to the two Cabernets, the Wagners also produce small amounts of Zinfandel and Sauvignon blanc under the Caymus label. The family also makes other wines under the "Wagner Family of Wine" -- Mer Soleil, Conundrum, Bonanza, Emmolo, Red Schooner and Sea Sun-- out of non-Cabernet varietals. Mer Soleil is a Chardonnay label made by Charlie Wagner, Chuck Wagner's eldest son, with two wines: the "Silver" is unoaked while the "regular" sees barrels. Conundrum produces non-varietal white and red wines.
