= Rancho Catacula =

Mexican land grant in California

Coordinates: 38.550°N 122.340°W

Rancho Catacula was a 8,546-acre (34.58 km^{2}) Mexican land grant in present-day Napa County, California given in 1844 by Governor Manuel Micheltorena to Joseph Ballinger Chiles. The grant was located along Chiles creek in the Chiles Valley east of St. Helena.

== History ==
Colonel Joseph Ballinger Chiles (1810 – 1885) first came to California in 1841 with the Bartleson-Bidwell Party. He made several trips across country. In 1843, he led the Walker-Chiles Party that included the two daughters of George C. Yount. In 1844, Chiles was granted the two square league Rancho Catacula. Chiles set up a grist mill and later built a distillery and began producing whiskey on a small scale. In 1848 Chiles made another overland trip to California, bringing his own family of a son and three daughters.

With the cession of California to the United States following the Mexican-American War, the 1848 Treaty of Guadalupe Hidalgo provided that the land grants would be honored. As required by the Land Act of 1851, a claim for Rancho Catacula was filed with the Public Land Commission in 1852, and the grant was patented to Joseph Ballinger Chiles in 1865.

In 1853, Chiles married Margret Jane Garnett. The Chiles house, built in 1856, is one of the oldest in the Napa Valley. In 1869, Joshua James Priest, who came to California in 1849, bought 692 acres (2.8 km^{2}) of Rancho Catacula called Soda Valley or Priest Ranch. In the 1870s, Francis Sievers, bought 286 acres (115.7 ha). In 1877, the Whittle family bought 990 acres (4.0 km^{2}) of in the eastern portion of Rancho Catacula called Elder Valley. After Chiles died, his nephew Isaac Skinner Chiles bought part of Rancho Catacula.

== Historic sites of the Rancho ==
- Chiles Mill. Joseph Ballinger Chiles, erected the first American flour mill in Northern California in 1845–1846.

California Historical Landmark number 547, Chiles Mill, reads:

NO. 547 CHILES MILL - Joseph Ballinger Chiles, who first came to California in 1841, erected the mill on Rancho Catacula 1845-46. The first American flour mill in Northern California, it was still in use in the 1880s. Chiles served as a vice president of the Society of California Pioneers, 1850-53.

== See also ==
- List of Ranchos of California
- Ranchos of California
