= Julien Miquel =

French winemaker and influencer

Julien Miquel AIWS is a French YouTuber and winemaker, best known for making word pronunciation videos on his channel, with over 61,000 uploads as of July 2026.

== Early life and career ==
Originally from France, Julien Miquel started learning English in school at age 10. He has lived and worked in Spain and Italy and speaks fluent Spanish, Italian and French. Miquel’s passion for languages began in childhood and continued during his career as a winemaker. He studied biology at University of Toulouse before graduating in 2004 from the French winemaking college Faculté d’Oenologie de Bordeaux. Miquel had an international flying winemaker career from 2004 to 2009, bringing him to some of the most famous wine estates in the world including Château Margaux in Bordeaux region, Château St Jean in Sonoma County, Caiarossa in Tuscany, and Campo Eliseo in Spain with famous winemaker Michel Rolland. For 6 years, he was the Team Leader for Wine-Searcher.

In 2015, the website founded by Julien Miquel was awarded 2015 Best New Wine Blog by the Wine Bloggers Conference. That same year, Miquel was ranked among the top ten most influential people in the world of wine on the internet and social media, according to the website Klout. After making his first YouTube videos on pronunciation in 2019, which focused initially on names of wines such as Cabernet Sauvignon and Pinot Noir as well as less-known geographic designations such as Gevrey-Chambertin and Châteauneuf-du-Pape, Miquel went on to produce thousands of videos about food, brands, vocabulary, and various expressions.

Some of his most popular and viewed videos count with millions of views on YouTube with the most searched-for topics including French and Italian fashion brands such as Louis Vuitton or Givenchy, as well as food and dish names like “croissant,” “Gnocchi,” or “Paella.” In his videos, Miquel explains which syllable to emphasize and points out any potential differences between American and British English, especially around words of foreign origin. Miquel claims to teach listeners the safest bet—the most common pronunciation of the word or various possible alternatives—rather than the definitive pronunciation. His videos are particularly popular in the United States, the UK, and India.
