= Burgess Cellars =

- Location: Deer Park, California, USA
- Coordinates: 38.5571°N 122.4748°W
- Appellation: Napa Valley AVA
- Founded: 1972
- First vintage: 1972
- Key people: Tom Burgess, Founder; Meghan Zobeck, Winemaker
- Cases/yr: 12,000
- Known for: Burgess Napa Valley Cabernet Sauvignon
- Varietals: Cabernet Sauvignon, Chardonnay, Syrah, Petit Verdot, Cabernet Franc, Petite Sirah, Malbec, Grenache, Rosé
- Distribution: National
- Tasting: By Appointment
- Website: www.burgesscellars.com

Burgess Cellars is a historic California wine producer in Napa Valley on the hillsides of Howell Mountain. It was founded in 1972 by Tom Burgess on a hillside vineyard and winery, and has been continuously family owned and operated. It is run by Lawrence Wine Estates and includes 65 acres across its two estate vineyards, which are at elevations of 800 to 1,000 feet (240 to 300 m).

== History ==
Tom Burgess was an Air Force pilot and a jet pilot for IBM who got interested in wine when he was flying around Europe, and interested in the Napa and Sonoma valleys while traveling around Travis Air Force Base.

In 1972 he bought the original Souverain vineyard from the Pillsbury Company, when they were moving production to Rutherford, and its 1888 winery.

== Wines ==
Burgess Cellars showcases its two estate vineyards on Howell Mountain, with a hillside terroir representing only 4% of Napa acreage. For much of Burgess Cellars history Cabernet Sauvignon has been the flagship grape since Burgess Cellars' inception in 1972. Today, they craft an estate and a reserve Cabernet Sauvignon, and also single-vineyard, single-block bottlings of Petite Sirah, Malbec, Petit Verdot, and an intentionally farmed rosé of Syrah. They also craft a single-vineyard Chardonnay with fruit purchased from the Balletto family of grape growers in Russian River Valley, Sonoma County. A library selection, with every vintage from 1979 on, is available in the tasting room.

In 2020, Meghan Zobeck was appointed winemaker of Burgess Cellars.
