= Chiles Valley AVA =

American Viticultural Area in Napa County, California

Coordinates: 38°37′31″N 122°22′16″W

Chiles Valley
- Wine region
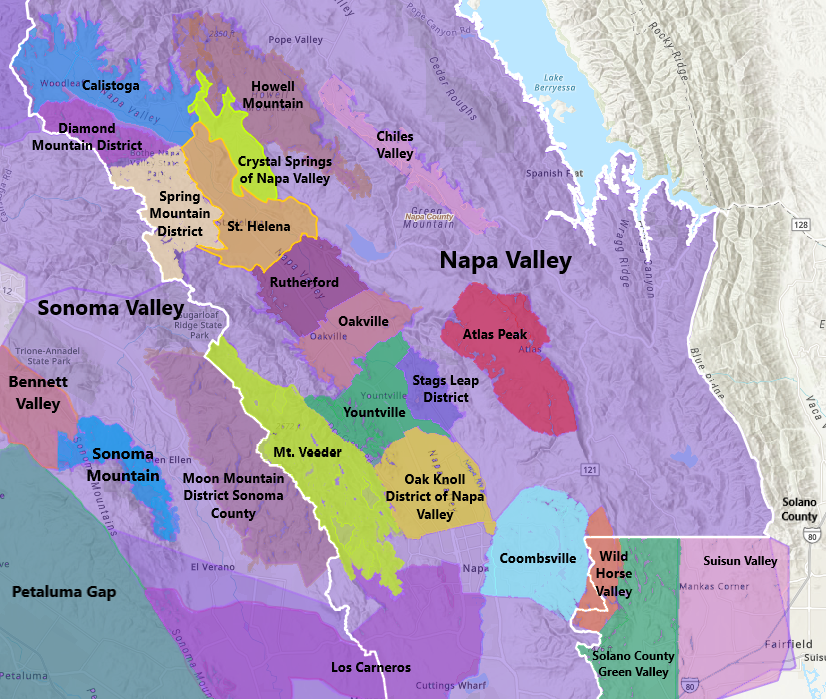
- Type: American Viticultural Area
- Year established: 1999
- Years of wine industry: 156
- Country: United States
- Part of: California, North Coast AVA, Napa County, Napa Valley AVA
- Other regions in California, North Coast AVA, Napa County, Napa Valley AVA: Atlas Peak AVA, Calistoga AVA, Crystal Springs of Napa Valley AVA, Diamond Mountain District AVA, Howell Mountain AVA, Los Carneros AVA, Coombsville AVA, Mt. Veeder AVA, Oak Knoll District of Napa Valley AVA, Oakville AVA, Rutherford AVA, Spring Mountain District AVA, St. Helena AVA, Stags Leap District AVA, Wild Horse Valley AVA, Yountville AVA
- Climate region: Region II
- Precipitation (annual average): up to 35 inches (889 mm)
- Soil conditions: Tehama Series, silt loams; decomposed chert & green serpentine on elevated slopes
- Total area: 6,000 acres (9 sq mi)
- Size of planted vineyards: 1,000 acres (405 ha)
- No. of vineyards: 7
- Varietals produced: Cabernet Franc, Cabernet Sauvignon, Chardonnay, Merlot, Muscadelle, Primitivo, Riesling, Sauvignon Blanc, Semillon, Syrah, Zinfandel
- No. of wineries: 9

Chiles Valley is an American Viticultural Area (AVA) located in Napa County, California and a sub-region within Napa Valley AVA. It was established as the nation's 136^{th}, the state's 82^{nd} and the county's thirteenth AVA on February 17, 1999 by the Bureau of Alcohol, Tobacco and Firearms (ATF), Treasury after reviewing the petition submitted by Mr. Volker Eisele, owner of the Volker Eisele Vineyard and Winery, representing the Chiles Valley District Committee proposing a viticultural area in Napa County to be known as "Chiles Valley District".

The Chiles Valley is nestled in the Vaca Mountains above the northeast side of the Napa Valley between and on the same latitude as St. Helena and Rutherford. The appellation has a cooler climate than the main Napa Valley floor due to elevations of 600–1,200 feet (183–366 m) as well as a cooling breeze from the Pacific Ocean. The area expands approximately 6,000 acres (9 sq mi) with 1,000 acres (405 ha) being cultivated in 1996. The remaining plantable area does not exceed 500 acres (202 ha). The most planted grapes in Chiles Valley are Cabernet Sauvignon, Zinfandel, Chardonnay, and Sauvignon Blanc.

The term "District" was requested as part of the viticultural area name in the original petition. ATF noticed the proposed area as "Chiles Valley" because ATF did not find that the petitioner submitted sufficient evidence to support the use of the term "District" with Chiles Valley. Six comments in the petition favored the addition of "District" to the name, but no additional evidence was submitted to support it. The comments only reiterated the petitioner's original argument that the use of the term "District" was important to distinguish the Chiles Valley from the larger Napa Valley. None of the comments added any data or historical evidence for the use of the term "District" in conjunction with Chiles Valley.

== History ==
The valley's first known inhabitants were the Wintun Nation who were a conglomerate of tribes settled in the Sacramento Delta. The Wappo, Pomo, Suisun, and Patwin were part of the Wintun Nation with the Wappo having the predominant presence in the valley. Chiles Valley was named after Joseph Ballinger Chiles, who received a large land grant in 1843, from Mexican governor of California Manuel Micheltorena, named Rancho Catacula. The 8,550 acres (3,460 ha) property is currently known as Chiles Creek. Chiles planted the first vineyards on Rancho Catacula in 1850. During the 1870s, Francis Sievers bought a parcel of Rancho Catacula, cultivated a vineyard and founded Lomita's Vineyard and Winery on site which is currently part of the Volker Eisele Family Estate. The area was historically a local source for tin, which was mined by residents in the area as of the 1881 while gypsum was found in the southern end of the valley. In August 2020, Chiles Valley residents were evacuated due to the Hennessey Fire, which resulted in the burning of over 315,000 acres (492 sq mi) in five counties, including 2,500 acres (3.9 sq mi) in Chiles Valley.

== Terroir ==
=== Topography and Climate ===
The geographical features of Chiles Valley AVA sets it apart from the surrounding area in the Napa Valley and produces a unique microclimate. The lands within its boundaries generally is between 800–1,000 feet (244–305 m) above sea level. The valley lies on a northwest–southeast axis acting as an open funnel for the prevailing northwesterly winds. This fairly constant northwesterly flow produces substantial cooling during the day and, in combination with the altitude, relatively dry air. During the night, this drier air leads to more rapid cooling than in most of the Napa Valley. In addition, the narrow valley is surrounded by hills up to 2,200 feet (671 m) which concentrate the cooler air flowing down the hillsides toward the valley floor where the vineyards are located. In the summer, Chiles Valley has sunny days that are occasionally cooled by afternoon fog. The relative distance from San Pablo Bay and the Pacific Ocean allows the summer fog to move in much later than in the main Napa Valley. By the time the fog does reach the Chiles Valley, the air temperatures have dropped much more dramatically than in the Napa Valley, thereby causing much lower temperatures during the night. Late fog ceiling, combined with low minimums, cause a very slow heat buildup during the day, again producing relatively cooler average temperatures than those found in many places of the Napa Valley. According to the U.C. Davis climate classification, Chiles Valley indicates a "Region Two". The growing season starts later than in the Napa Valley due to a colder winter with temperatures dropping below 20 °F (−7 °C). The high incidence of spring frost is another indication of the generally cooler climate conditions. In the areas immediately adjacent to the boundaries, the micro-climate changes significantly. As one moves up the hillsides on either side of Chiles Valley, the summer fog blanket gets thinner and thinner and disappears altogether at approximately 1,400 to 1,500 feet (430–460 m) elevation. Since the cold air drains down into the Chiles Valley, the night time temperatures are quite a bit higher on the steep slopes than on the valley floor. In addition, the lack of fog allows a much faster temperature build up during the day, reaching the daily high two to three hours earlier than on the valley floor. Not only is the temperature drop at nightfall less, but also much more gradual so that during a 24-hour period the heat summation is substantially higher on the slopes than within the AVA boundaries. In winter, the situation is reversed. Strong winds tend to chill the uplands creating a cooler climate than on the valley floor. Snowfall above 1,400 feet (427 m) elevation has been observed many times. The microclimatic limitations combined with enormous steepness and very poor soil (serpentine, heavy sandstone formations, and shale out croppings) create an abrupt change from the viticultural area to the areas surrounding it. The Pope Valley to the north of Chiles Valley is also significantly different. A combination of a lower elevation valley floor and substantially higher mountains on the western side causes the formation of inversion layers, which result in substantially higher average temperatures during the growing season and significantly lower ones in the winter. In addition, the summer fog from the Pacific Ocean never reaches the Pope Valley. The plant hardiness zone ranges from 9a to 9b.

=== Soil ===
The soils within the Chiles Valley are well drained and of medium fertility. The overall terrain gently slopes toward a series of creeks, which act as natural drainage for surface as well as subterranean water. The petitioner believes this is a good basis for high quality grapes. Uniform elevation and relatively uniform soil make the viticultural area a clearly identifiable growing area. Almost all vineyards lie between 800 and 1,000 feet (240–300 m) elevation while some extend to 1,000–1,700 feet (300–520 m) elevations. As a general rule, the soils in the Chiles Valley all belong to the Tehama Series: nearly level to gently slopping, well drained Silt loams on flood plains and alluvial fans. The elevated vineyards are made mostly of decomposed chert, a rocky red volcanic soil, and green serpentine.

== Viticulture ==
The local viticultural production has been affected by the valley's remote isolation both favorably and unfavorably. Its distance from the rest of the Napa Valley essentially excluded it from the late 19th century wine business boom cycle. However, Chiles Valley vineyard development was largely protected from Napa Valley's phylloxera outbreaks in the 1980s and 90s as its pre-phylloxera vines still thrive today. These century-old vines are some of the most prized AxR1 rootstock in the AVA producing low yields, and quality grapes. From Prohibition until the early 1970s, very little wine was produced in the Chiles Valley. The region was too small and remote to be a significant contributor to the mass-produced fortified and popular jug wines marketed for decades following Prohibition. In 1972, the Meyer Family purchased a large tract of land that previously was a thoroughbred horse ranch. They began growing Sauvignon Blanc, Chardonnay, Riesling, Zinfandel and Cabernet Sauvignon establishing RustRidge Ranch and Winery in 1985. In addition, on the legendary Rancho Catacula parcel, the Volker Eisele Family began cultivating Cabernet Sauvignon in 1975. Although, 90% of its grapes are sold to other wineries, Eisele Family Estate is currently the largest producer in the Chiles Valley. Mr. Eisele submitted the ATF petition that was approved to establish the valley's AVA status in 1999. There are currently a little over 1,000 acres (405 ha) of vines in Chiles Valley. Most of the arable land within the AVA is being used for grape production, but there are still a few hundred acres that are not developed. Representing the AVA's seven vineyards and nine wineries, the Napa Valley Backroads Winery Experience organization was established by three wineries, Catacula Lake, RustRidge, and Nichelini, to promote Chiles Valley.
