= Coombsville AVA =

American Viticultural Area in California

Coordinates: 38°18′59″N 122°13′46″W

Coombsville
- Wine region
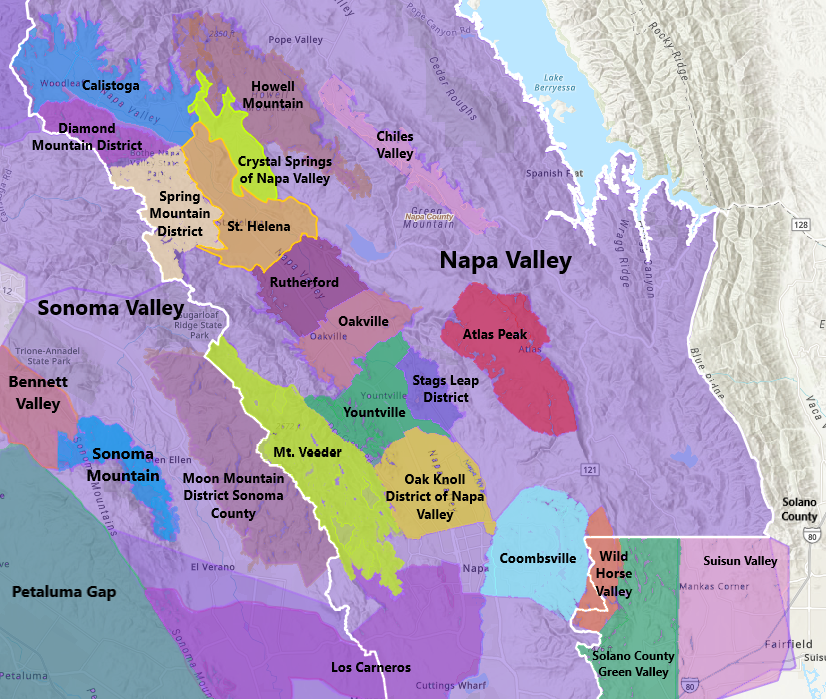
- Type: American Viticultural Area
- Year established: 2011
- Country: United States
- Part of: California, North Coast AVA, Napa County, Napa Valley AVA
- Other regions in California, North Coast AVA, Napa County, Napa Valley AVA: Calistoga AVA, Chiles Valley AVA, Diamond Mountain District AVA, Howell Mountain AVA, Los Carneros AVA, Mt. Veeder AVA, Atlas Peak AVA, Oak Knoll District of Napa Valley AVA, Oakville AVA, Rutherford AVA, Spring Mountain District AVA, St. Helena AVA, Stags Leap District AVA, Wild Horse Valley AVA, Yountville AVA, Crystal Springs of Napa Valley AVA
- Growing season: 273 days
- Climate region: Region II
- Heat units: 2,550 GDD units
- Precipitation (annual average): 19.14 in (486.16 mm)
- Soil conditions: Hambright-Rock outcrop, Coombs, Sobrante, Forward, Haire & Cole series
- Total area: 11,075 acres (17 sq mi)
- Size of planted vineyards: 1,360 acres (550 ha)
- No. of vineyards: 26
- Grapes produced: Cabernet Sauvignon, Chardonnay, Pinot noir, Syrah
- No. of wineries: 4

Coombsville is an American Viticultural Area (AVA) located within Napa County, California just east of the city of Napa. The 11,075-acre (17 sq mi) wine appellation was established as the nation's 200^{th}, the state's 123^{rd} and the county's eighteenth AVA on December 13, 2011 by the Alcohol and Tobacco Tax and Trade Bureau (TTB), Treasury after reviewing the petition submitted by Thomas Farella of Farella-Park Vineyards and Bradford Kitson, on behalf of the vintners and grape growers in the Coombsville region of Napa Valley, proposing the viticultural area named "Coombsville."
The appellation is nestled in the southeastern region of the Napa Valley viticultural area, between the eastern shores of both the Napa River and Milliken Creek and the western ridgeline of the Vaca Range at the Solano County line. Proximity to San Pablo Bay contributes to the temperate climate of Coombsville where the cool marine air and fog occurs almost daily during the growing season, arriving early and linger longer in the southern region of Napa Valley. Temperatures are also less extreme during the winter frost season. The Coombsville soils are dominated by the volcanic, rhyolitic tuff sedimentary rock and lava flows of the Vaca Range on the eastern side of the Napa Valley. Coombsville lies upon wide alluvial deposits created by the weathering of the hillsides and its soils contain abundant rock, gravel and, in some areas, layered with volcanic ash deposits from Mount George. The area is the sixteenth sub-appellation designated within the 252,541-acre (395 sq mi) Napa Valley viticultural area. Its USDA plant hardiness zone is 9b.

== History ==
Coombsville (/ˈkumzvɪl/ KOOMZ-vil) is the commonly used name for the area east of the city of Napa, California. While the name sounds like that of a town or city, no such town or city exists in the area. As early as 1914, an unincorporated area of Napa County became commonly known as the "Coombsville" region, named for Nathan Coombs, a prominent community leader and founder of the City of Napa. Mr. Coombs owned 2,525 acres (4 sq mi) of land on 3 parcels to the east of the Napa River, in the area now called "Coombsville." Work performed by Coombs for landowner Nicholas Higuera was paid for with land. Coombs traded this parcel for another one along the west bank of the Napa River where he laid out a town site. The town was initially referred to as Coombsville, but the name quickly became Napa City. Later it was shortened to Napa. Evidence of how the name Coombsville transferred from the fledging town to the area east of town has not been found. It was very likely in deference to Nathan Coombs. After founding Napa City, he became one of the most important figures in the community. His funeral in 1877 was described as being the largest ever in Napa Valley with turnout from the entire county. Coombs also was a large landowner in the area east of Napa City. The map, County of Napa, California, 1876, indicates Coombs had parcels of 2123 acres, 162 acres and 240 acres.

== Terroir ==
=== Geography ===
The most notable geographical characteristic of the Coombsville viticultural area is a horseshoe-shaped, elevated landform, part of the Vaca Range. The west-facing horseshoe comprises a ring of volcanic mountains, according to the petition. The elevated "cup-and-saucer" landform lies partially within the curvature of the horseshoe on the western side of the viticultural area. A small flood plain lies along the western portion of the boundary line near the Napa River and Milliken Creek. The petition states that gentle slopes and rolling terrain extend westward from the Vaca Range and the opening of the horseshoe to the Napa River and Milliken Creek, and that most viticultural activity occurs within this area. The petition states that the Milliken-Sarco-Tulocay watershed, named after the three main creeks in the region, lies within the Coombsville viticultural area. The cup-and-saucer landform presents a drainage obstacle, making Sarco Creek detour to the north and Tulocay Creek flow to the south. Eventually, all drainage flows to the southwest and joins with the south- flowing Napa River, the petition explains. According to USGS maps, elevations within the Coombsville viticultural area vary from about 10 feet (3 m) along Milliken Creek and the Napa River shoreline to 1,877 feet (572 m) at the peak of Mt. George, at the northeast corner of the Coombsville viticultural area along the western ridge of the Vaca Range. The landforms along the remaining caldera wall that forms the edge of the "saucer" vary from approximately 500 to 1,200 feet (152–366 m) in elevation, some having steep terrain. The raised "cup" portion of the cup-and-saucer formation exceeds 400 feet (122 m) in elevation in some areas. The surrounding gentle slopes and rolling terrain which form the bottom of the "saucer" vary from approximately 100 to 200 feet (30–61 m) in elevation. The flood plain along the western boundary line varies in elevation from 10 to 20 feet (3–6 m) along Milliken Creek and the Napa River. The combination of unique landforms and large elevation differences gives the Coombsville viticultural area a fog-protected partial basin with high surrounding ridges. The aerial photograph submitted with the petition shows Coombsville as an isolated niche within the larger, more open terrain of the Napa Valley viticultural area. Also, the USGS maps indicate that the Vaca Range to the east provides a natural geographical boundary for the viticultural area. According to the USGS maps and the petition, the regions surrounding the Coombsville viticultural area have different geographies. To the northwest of the viticultural area lies the Oak Knoll District of Napa Valley viticultural area, which can be distinguished from the Coombsville viticultural area by its low valley floor elevations and the dry creek alluvial fan. To the west lies the City of Napa. To the southwest lies the Los Carneros viticultural area, which can be distinguished from the viticultural area by its low rolling hills, flatlands, and mountainous terrain. To the southeast lies the Solano County Green Valley viticultural area, with a more rugged terrain than the Coombsville viticulture area. To the east lies the Wild Horse Valley viticultural area, which can be distinguished from the viticultural area by its isolated valley and the surrounding steep, rugged terrain and high elevations. To the northeast are the Vaca Mountains, which can be distinguished from the viticultural area by their rugged terrain.

=== Climate ===
Coombsville viticultural area has climatically unique features, including precipitation and heat summation. The petition provides statistical information on the microclimates of the adjacent Los Carneros and Oak Knoll District of Napa Valley viticultural areas, which are both within the larger Napa Valley viticultural area. According to the petitioner, the isolated Wild Horse Valley and Solano County Green Valley viticultural areas, to the immediate east of the Coombsville viticultural area, lack available weather station data. In considering this petition, TTB obtained historic weather station data for surrounding north, east, south, and west regions within 15 miles (24 km) or less of the Coombsville viticultural area (Lake Berryessa, Fairfield, Napa State Hospital, and the City of Napa, respectively) from the Western Regional Climate Center (WRCC) Web site, created in partnership with the National Climatic Data Center, Regional Climate Centers, and State Climate Offices. The petition's table data presents average annual precipitation amounts and heat summation range totals for the Coombsville region, the Los Carneros and Oak Knoll District of Napa Valley viticultural areas, and the surrounding north, east, south, and west weather station areas. The table data is based primarily on petition documentation and also TTB’s WRCC Web site data research. The table shows that precipitation in the Coombsville viticultural area averages 19.14 inches (486 mm) annually, and varies from the surrounding viticultural microclimates. The Coombsville region is warmer and wetter than the Los Carneros viticultural area to the southwest and cooler and drier than the Oak Knoll District of Napa Valley viticultural area to the northwest, according to Michael Wolf, owner of Michael Wolf Vineyard Services. To the northwest, the Oak Knoll District of Napa Valley viticultural area averages 2.5 inches (64 mm) more annual rainfall. To the southwest, the Los Carneros viticultural area has about 2 inches (51 mm) less rainfall annually. The data in the table indicates that the Coombsville viticultural area averages 3.63 to 5.47 inches (92–139 mm) less precipitation annually than the four surrounding areas for which weather station data was obtained by TTB. The growing season in the Coombsville viticultural area is measured in the Winkler climate classification system. In the Winkler system, heat accumulation per year defines climatic regions. As a measurement of heat accumulation during the growing season, 1 degree day accumulates for each degree Fahrenheit that a day’s mean temperature is above 50 degrees, which is the minimum temperature required for grapevine growth. Climatic region I has less than 2,500 growing degree days (GDD) per year; region II, 2,501 to 3,000; region III, 3,001 to 3,500; region IV, 3,501 to 4,000; and region V, 4,001 or more. According to the table, the Coombsville region is a low Winkler region II (2,550 GDD units), which is cooler by 61 to 683 degree units than the four surrounding areas from which weather station data was obtained by TTB. The coolest of the four areas is Lake Berryessa to the north at 2,611 GDD units (region II), and the warmest is the City of Napa to the west at 3,233 GDD units (region III). Also, the adjacent Oak Knoll District of Napa Valley viticultural area is significantly warmer at 2,888 GDD units, a high Winkler region II. The adjacent Los Carneros viticultural area is cooler than the Coombsville region (region l) at 2,435 GDD units. The petition states that significant viticultural factors for the Coombsville region growing season include the amount of solar radiation and daytime heating. The solar radiation and heating are affected by the dissipation rate of morning fog, followed by the number of hours of sunshine, and then the onset of afternoon cooling bay breezes from San Pablo Bay. The petition states that the effects of the presence and disappearance of fog from the Napa Valley region in the day alters the temperature rise in the grape-growing season. Temperature and sunlight have subtle effects on grape development that, over the growing season, affect grape ripening times and flavors. The pace of sugar accumulation and the pace of the lessening of acidity during grape ripening are two examples of how the fog affects grape development. The petition notes that grape growers in the cooler Los Carneros viticultural area, to the south and closer to the foggy bay, harvest grapes with similar sugar and acidity levels for the same varietal as in the Coombsville region, but do so later in the growing season. To the north of the Coombsville region, in the warmer and less foggy Oak Knoll District of Napa Valley viticultural area, the same varietals with similar sugar and acid levels are harvested earlier than in the Coombsville and Los Carneros areas. The petition explains that the Coombsville region has more sunlight and daytime heat during the growing season than the Los Carneros viticultural area to the southwest and less than the Oak Knoll District of Napa Valley viticultural area to the northwest. The morning fog generally dissipates about 1 to 2 hours earlier in the Coombsville region than in the Los Carneros viticultural area to the southwest, and an hour later than in the Oak Knoll District of Napa Valley viticultural area to the northwest. Also, in the afternoon, the bay breezes first cool the Los Carneros viticultural area, then spread slowly northward through the Coombsville region into the Oak Knoll District of Napa Valley viticultural area, and eventually continue northward up the Napa Valley. According to the petition, as the San Pablo Bay afternoon breezes reach northward to each micro-climate in the Napa Valley region, the air temperature incrementally stops rising, or slightly decreases. These cool breezes contribute to the differences in maximum daytime temperatures during the growing season for the south-to-north locations in the Los Carneros viticultural area, the Coombsville region, Oak Knoll District of Napa Valley viticultural area, and other Napa Valley viticultural areas.

=== Geology ===
The petition describes the ancient volcanic and crustal uplift events in the geologic history of the Coombsville region. The initial geological event was the eruption and collapse of a volcano that was part of the Napa Valley-Sonoma volcanic series. The collapse of the volcano created a bowl-shaped structure known as a caldera, which formed the basis for the "cup and saucer" topography within the Coombsville region. The next important geologic process began when crustal forces started to uplift and wrinkle the earth crust in the Vaca Range. The uplift progressed from east to west through the Vaca Range. When the uplift passed through the Coombsville region, the western front of the caldera collapsed and slid westward as a large landslide into the valley below. The ancient Napa River removed most of the landslide debris from the Napa Valley. The remaining debris formed a raised structure in the valley, and the remaining portion of the caldera formed a horseshoe-shaped ridge to the east. This area is referred to on USGS maps of the Coombsville area as the "cup and saucer," since the raised area resembles a teacup sitting within the curved "saucer" formed by the remaining ridge of the caldera. The petition states that the earth surface materials that cover the Coombsville viticultural area originated in a variety of ways. A thin coat of residual debris on volcanic bedrock covers the hills. Within the remains of the caldera, alluvial gravels of the Huichica Formation occur in the northern part and diatomaceous lake deposits occur along the northeast edge. The remainder of the surface material is a variety of alluvial deposits laid down since the ancient volcanic collapse. The petition did not include data on the geology of the surrounding areas.

=== Soils ===
The soils of the Coombsville viticultural area are generally well drained and of volcanic origin. Upland soils are weathered from their primary volcanic source, while lowland soils are alluvial in nature. The Hambright-Rock outcrop complex makes up 28.5 percent of the Coombsville area and is found in lesser concentrations to the north, east, and south. The complex is found in the Vaca Range and makes up most of the cup-and-saucer landform soils. Coombs gravelly and stony loams represent 24.1 percent of the soils in the Coombsville area, and are found in lesser concentrations to the north, east, and west. In addition, those soils are the main types appropriate for grape growing in the Coombsville region. They are alluvial, well drained soils at elevations of 50 to 500 feet (15–152 m). The Coombs soils are "relatively unique to the area," and they were likely first identified in the Coombsville area, according to the petition. Coombs soils make up only 1.7 percent of the soils in Napa County, but they account for almost a quarter of the Coombsville region soils. As shown in the petition, Sobrante soils make up 15.5 percent of the Coombsville region, 16 percent to the east in Wild Horse Valley, and a much lesser concentration to the northwest. These soils are well drained and are at elevations of 120 feet (37 m) and higher. As shown on the petition tables, soils found in lesser concentrations in the Coombsville viticultural area include Haire and Cole, which have higher concentrations in three of the surrounding areas.
