= Sanitarium, California =

Unincorporated community in California, United States

Sanitarium
- unincorporated community
- Location in California Sanitarium (the United States)
- Coordinates: 38°32′42″N 122°28′32″W
- Country: United States
- State: California
- County: Napa
- Elevation: 587 ft (179 m)

Sanitarium (formerly, Crystal Springs) is an unincorporated community in Napa County, California, United States. It lies at an elevation of 587 feet (179 m). Sanitarium is located 2.5 miles (4.0 km) north of Saint Helena.

The settlement was founded in 1878 by Seventh-day Adventists who opened a sanitarium that they called the Rural Health Retreat at Crystal Springs, later St. Helena Sanitarium, and now St. Helena Hospital. The community that developed around the sanitarium was called Sanitarium.

The Sanitarium post office operated from 1901 to 1970, when it was removed and renamed Deer Park.
