= Rancho La Jota =

Mexican land grant

Coordinates: 38.580°N 122.430°W

Rancho La Jota was a 4,454-acre (7.0 sq mi) Mexican land grant in present-day Napa County, California, given in 1843 by Governor Manuel Micheltorena to George C. Yount. La Jota means "the letter J" in Spanish, but the meaning of the name has been a cause of speculation. However, the Rutherford Family has always understood "J" as being the initial for Jorge, the Spanish form of the name George.

== History ==
Through the influence of Mariano Guadalupe Vallejo, George C. Yount received the two square league Rancho Caymus in 1836, and became the first American settler in the Napa Valley. In 1843 he received the one square league Rancho La Jota on Howell Mountain to the north of Rancho Caymus. Yount planned to construct a sawmill on the mountaintop land.

With the cession of California to the United States following the Mexican-American War, the 1848 Treaty of Guadalupe Hidalgo provided that the land grants would be honored. As required by the Land Act of 1851, a claim for Rancho La Jota was filed with the Public Land Commission in 1852. The Land Commission rejected Yount's claim, but the United States District Court reversed the decision. The Rancho La Jota grant was patented to George C. Yount in 1857.

Edwin Angwin, in 1875, purchased 200 acres (0.3 sq mi) and established the Angwin Resort. By the 1900s, Edwin owned almost 1,600 acres (2.5 sq mi). The community of Angwin is named after him. In 1909, Angwin sold the property to the Seventh-day Adventist Church, who established Pacific Union College on the site.

== Historic sites of the Rancho ==
- La Jota Vineyard, a winery built in 1898 from the local volcanic rock by Frederick Hess. Hess, the publisher of the German-language California Demokrat in San Francisco, purchased 327 acres (0.5 sq mi) of Rancho La Jota.

In 1975, Bill Smith bought part of Rancho La Jota, including the old stone winery from the late 1800s, and started La Jota Vineyard Company. There, he replanted the vineyards that were torn out during Prohibition and started making stellar Cabernets until the year 2000.

== See also ==
- Ranchos of California
- List of Ranchos of California
