= Caymus, California =

Caymus
- Former settlement
- Location in California
- Coordinates: 38°24′20″N 122°21′49″W
- Country: United States
- State: California
- County: Napa
- Elevation: 105 ft (32 m)

Caymus (also Caymas) is a former settlement in Napa County, California, United States. It lay at an elevation of 105 feet (32 m). Caymus was located on the Southern Pacific Railroad, 1.5 miles (2.4 km) southeast of Rutherford.

Caymas was located on Rancho Caymus, a Mexican land grant, a very notable wine-producing area.
