= Atlas Peak AVA =

American Viticultural Area in Napa County, California

Coordinates: 38°26′02″N 122°14′37″W

Atlas Peak
- Wine region
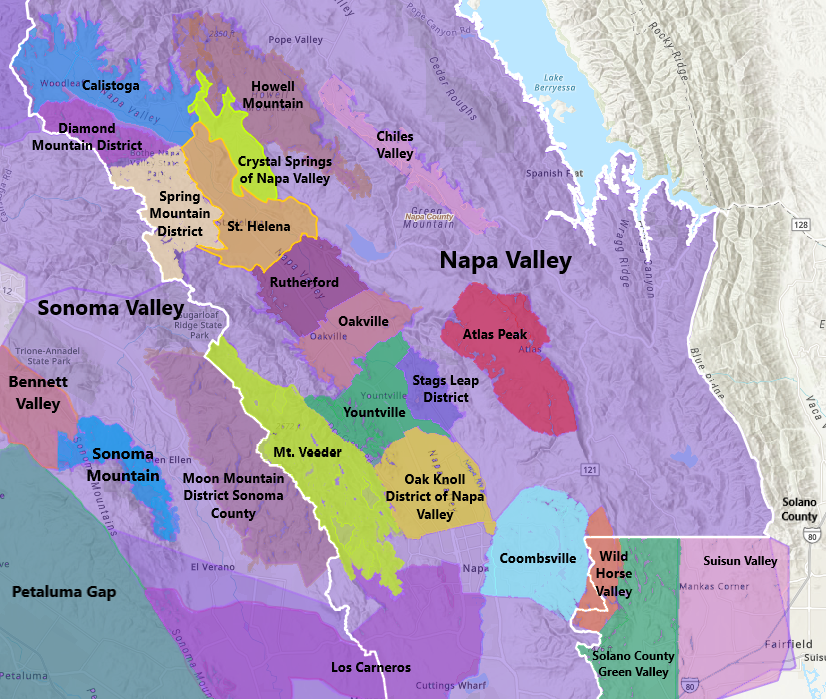
- Type: American Viticultural Area
- Year established: 1992
- Years of wine industry: 156
- Country: United States
- Part of: Napa Valley AVA
- Other regions in Napa Valley AVA: Calistoga AVA, Chiles Valley AVA, Diamond Mountain District AVA, Howell Mountain AVA, Los Carneros AVA, Mt. Veeder AVA, Coombsville AVA, Oak Knoll District of Napa Valley AVA, Oakville AVA, Rutherford AVA, Spring Mountain District AVA, St. Helena AVA, Stags Leap District AVA, Wild Horse Valley AVA, Yountville AVA
- Growing season: 273 days
- Climate region: Region II
- Precipitation (annual average): 37.5 inches (952 mm)
- Soil conditions: Alluvial and residual upland soils derived entirely from volcanic parent material
- Total area: 11,400 acres (18 sq mi)
- Size of planted vineyards: 1,500 acres (607 ha)
- No. of vineyards: 18
- Grapes produced: Cabernet Franc, Cabernet Sauvignon, Chardonnay, Merlot, Petit Verdot, Sangiovese, Syrah, Zinfandel
- No. of wineries: 11

Atlas Peak is an American Viticultural Area (AVA) located in eastern Napa County California about six to ten miles (10–16 km) north-northeast of the county seat of Napa on the western slope of the Vaca Range which separates Napa Valley and Sacramento Valley. It was established as the nation's 115^{th}, the state's 66^{th} and the county's eighth appellation on January 22, 1992 by the Bureau of Alcohol, Tobacco and Firearms (ATF), Treasury after reviewing the petition submitted by Mr. Richard Mendelson, on behalf of Atlas Peak Vineyards, the only bonded winery within the area, proposing a viticultural area in Napa County to be known as "Atlas Peak."

At an elevation of 2,663 feet (812 m), Atlas Peak is the most prominent landform in the viticultural area which also includes the Foss Valley and portions of the Rector and Milliken Canyons. The petition stated that the original derivation of the name "Atlas Peak" for the mountain and the surrounding area remains unclear but that the name has been applied since at least 1875. The viticultural area sits on a higher elevation than most of Napa Valley's wine region which limits the effects of the cool fog coming in from Pacific Ocean. The westward orientation of most vineyards on the slopes also extends the amount of direct sunlight on the grapes. The soil is volcanic and very porous which allows it to cool down quickly despite the increased sunlight. The area has a fairly significant diurnal temperature variation upwards of 30 °F (−1 °C) between daytime and night. This contributes to the balance of acidity that Atlas Peak grapes are known to have.
The viticultural area encompasses approximately 11,400 acres (18 sq mi) with currently about 1,500 acres (607 ha) under vine on eighteen commercial vineyards. At the outset, there was one winery, Atlas Peak Vineyards, and one additional winery under construction. Currently, there are now eleven wineries residing in Atlas Peak.

In August 2020, the Atlas Peak area was evacuated due to the Hennessey Fire which resulted in the burning of over 315,000 acres (492 sq mi) in five counties including northern Atlas Peak.

== History ==
According to the petition, James Reed Harris planted the first vineyard of 1,000 acres (405 ha) under vines in 1870. By 1893, Harris' vineyard had grown to 47 acres (19 ha). The petitioner provided an 1895 Napa County assessor's map marked with the locations of six vineyards shown by the assessor's records to be located within the area. According to the petitioner, vineyards in the Atlas Peak area survived the Phylloxera epidemic of the 1890's, but were abandoned after enactment of Prohibition in 1920. No new vines were planted until 1940 when the first new vineyard was planted on Mead Ranch, in the southwest portion of the viticultural area. Between 1951 and 1968, six new vineyards were added. Beginning in 1981, several new vineyard plantings were developed in the Atlas Peak area, often utilizing sites previously planted to vines in the 19th century. The petitioner states that Zinfandel is presently the grape variety most recognized for its regional character, but he anticipates that as "young vineyards in the region reach maturity, other grape varieties-including Cabernet Sauvignon and Chardonnay-may well receive individual recognition for their special character." The petitioner submitted samples of Zinfandel labels utilized by one California winery which identifies the grapes in the wine as being grown in e Atlas Peak area. He also submitted copies of the lists of offerings at the annual Napa Valley Wine Auctions of 1981. 1982 and 1988, which show the source of grapes used in some of the Rutherford Hill wines as "vines at the Mead Ranch atop Atlas Peak.

== Terroir ==
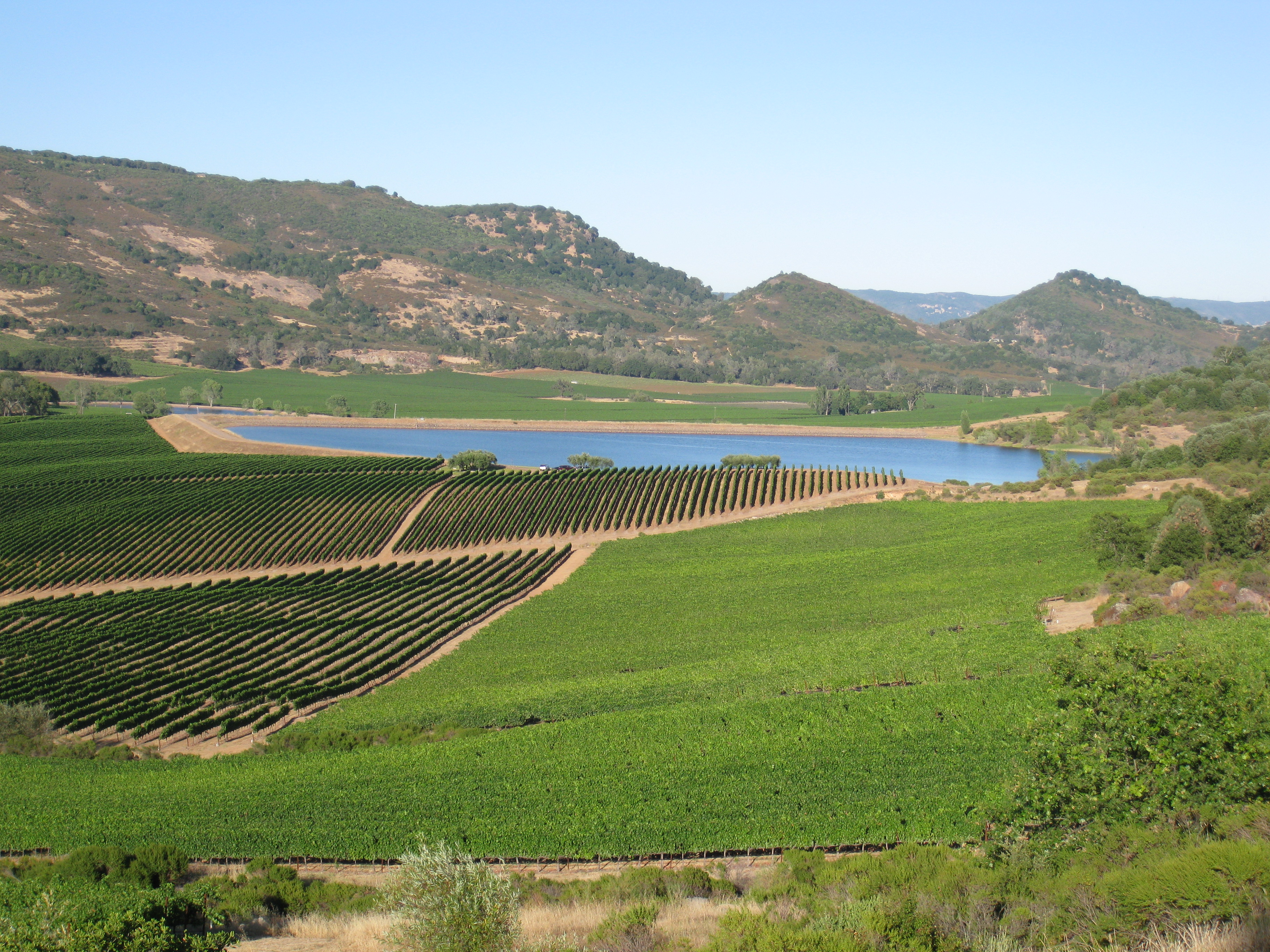
Atlas Peak vineyards

=== Topography ===
The area's highest elevation is 2,663 feet (812 m) above sea level at the summit of Atlas Peak. The lowest points are 760 feet (232 m) above sea level at the bottom of Rector Canyon. in the northwest corner of the area, and the water level of the Milliken Reservoir, 924 feet (282 m) elevation, at the bottom of Milliken Canyon, in the southeastern portion of the area. Most of the viticultural area, even the Foss Valley described by the petitioner as an "elevated hanging valley," is more than 1400 feet above sea level. It is bound by volcanic ridges and drained by Rector Canyon to the west and Milliken Canyon to the south. According to the petitioner, the topography. "an elevated valley surrounded by volcanic mountains of relatively shallow relief," is unusual for the area.

=== Climate ===
The petitioner included a separate report on the climate of the proposed area prepared by Michael Pechner, a consulting meteorologist. His report describes the area as "very distinctive, and perhaps unique in Northern California." In support of this claim, it describes the effect of the location and topography of the Atlas Peak area on the growing conditions. Although the area is only 40 miles (64 km) from the Pacific Ocean and subject to the afternoon and evening cooling which are characteristic of maritime influence, the area is free from the fogs which are drawn up into the rest of the Napa Valley. Mr. Pechner attributes the lack of fog to the fact that the area is east of Napa, has a high elevation, and is connected to Napa Valley by narrow canyons. The report also indicates that cooling in the area is influenced by the fact that the area is characterized by shallow volcanic soils and large areas of volcanic rock. This contributes to radiant cooling, resulting in late afternoon temperatures which can drop as much as 30 °F (−1 °C) in two hours, and in daily minimum temperatures which are usually lower than those in nearby Stags Leap, Yountville, or Napa. Finally, Mr. Pechner's report indicates that the annual rainfall in the Atlas Peak area is greater than in surrounding areas, "due to the terrain forcing the moist air masses of winter storms upward as they move inland along a southeasterly path from the coast, causing condensation." He contrasts average rainfall within the Atlas Peak area of 37.5 inches (952 mm) per year (over a 45-year period) with averages of 25 to 35 inches (635–889 mm) of rain per year in other parts of Napa Valley. According to the petition, only Howell Mountain, well to the north, has higher rainfall totals than the Atlas Peak area. The USDA plant hardiness zone range is 9a to 9b.

=== Soils ===
According to a report prepared by Eugene L. Begg, Soils Consultant, and submitted by the petitioner, soils of the Atlas Peak viticultural area are predominantly volcanic in origin. The soil series reported within the area by the Soil Survey of Napa County, California (updated 1978). are Aiken, Boomer, Felta, Guenoc, and Hambright soils from andesite and basalt; the Forward soils from rhyolite; the Bale, Perkins, and Maxwell soils from valley fill alluvium: and the Henneke and Montara soils from serpentine. According to Begg's report, only the Henneke and Montara soils, which represent a small percentage of the soils within the area, are from a non-volcanic source. By way of contrast, the soils in surrounding areas such as Soda Canyon, Capell Valley, Wooden Valley, Napa Valley and Stags Leap are far more diverse since they are derived from both volcanic and sedimentary rock sources.

== See also ==
- Atlas Peak fire
