= Joseph Chiles =

American pioneer

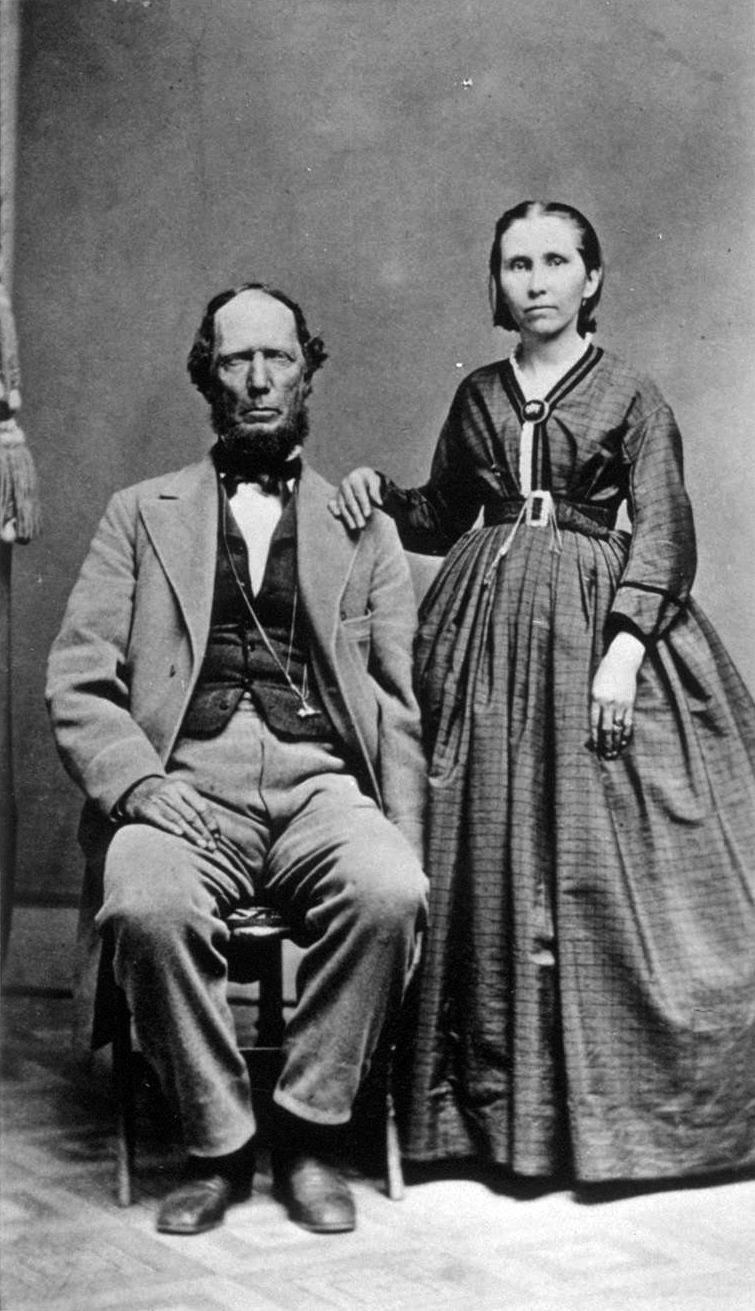
Col. and Mrs. Chiles

Joseph Ballinger Chiles (July 16, 1810 – June 25, 1885), later known by his Spanish name José B. Chiles, was a Californian ranchero, military officer, and entrepreneur. Born in Kentucky, Chiles served as a colonel in the U.S. Army during the Seminole Wars, before eventually immigrating to Alta California, where he became a Mexican citizen and acquired multiple rancho grants in the Napa Valley and Sacramento Valley.

== California ==
Widowed, he placed his children with relatives to join the Bartleson-Bidwell Party of 1841, the first wagon train to enter Mexican Alta California over the Sierra Nevadas.

He returned east in 1842 and subsequently led seven more wagon trains into California. At Fort Hall he met Joseph Rutherford Walker whom he convinced to lead half the settlers with him traveling in wagons back to California down the Humboldt River. Chiles led the rest in a pack train party up the Malheur River and on south to California via the Pit and Sacramento Rivers. Walker's party in 1843 also abandoned their wagons and finished getting to California by pack train.

In 1844, Chiles received Mexican citizenship and was granted the Rancho Catacula in Napa Valley. He operated a grist mill and a ferry across the Sacramento River.

In 1850, he also purchased part of the Rancho Laguna de Santos Calle. The area is the present day site of Davis, California.

== See also ==
- California Trail
