= Wine-Searcher =

Search engine

- Company type: Search engine
- Industry: Internet
- Founded: 1998
- Founder: Martin Brown
- Headquarters: Auckland, New Zealand
- Key people: Julian Perry (CEO)
- Products: Wine information
- Website: www.wine-searcher.com

Wine-Searcher is a vertical search engine enabling users to locate the price and availability of a given wine, whiskey, spirit or beer globally, and be directed to a business selling the alcoholic beverage. There are also both Wine-Searcher and WhiskeySearcher mobile apps for iOS and Android.

As of November 2024, Wine-Searcher had approximately 20 million wine, beer and spirit listings across 126 countries in more than 80 currencies. It takes listings from around 38,000 stores and producers globally.

Income is derived from advertising, paid access to professional content, and providing access to market data and insight.

== Additional features ==
Scores and tasting notes from critics are offered on the site. Wine-Searcher also contains an encyclopedia, which covers grape varieties, product categories, producer profiles, vintage reports and wine regions.

The Wine-Searcher and WhiskySearcher apps also offer a label-recognition tool. Users can take a photo of a label to find out more about prices and availability, including nearby stores to current location.

On the website and apps, users can save the details of products they have tried or purchased, or create a wish list. They can give products ratings (1 to 5 stars) and upload reviews.

== Market data ==
Every day Wine-Searcher collects and stores online wine lists from a global range of wine retailers, producers and auction houses. This is done by proprietary spiders, which access websites and data feeds or utilize custom integrations with the target source. Manual and automated operations run daily to ensure accurate content and remove incorrect or out-of-date lists.

The long-term storage of data allows Wine-Searcher to offer detailed reports and market analysis including current and historical trends. This data can be packed on a global or regional scale for multinationals and other clients with a broader sales focus. It can also be pinned down to a single product, sold by a single merchant.

== History ==
The company was founded in 1998 by Martin Brown, a former e-commerce manager for London wine merchant Berry Bros & Rudd. In six months, Martin Brown coded the first version of the website, launching it in 1999. In 2006, the operation was shifted from London to Auckland, in Brown's native New Zealand.

In April 2018, Martin Brown stepped down as CEO of Wine-Searcher, succeeded by Julian Perry. The following year Wine-Searcher opened a UK office in London to strengthen its handle on the European and the US markets. In 2023 Wine-Searcher was taken over by Flaviar.

In May 2026 the company was acquired by GLX U.S. Inc. (GLX), a New York-headquartered company and wholly owned subsidiary of Platin Sàrl, the investment company of the Goudet family.

As of mid-2026 the company has a staff of around 80 employees, including software developers, designers, database administrators, data analysts, product managers, customer relationship managers, wine specialists and content writers. It has been self-funding throughout its history.

== Awards ==
In October 2022, at the Golden Vines Awards (the "Oscars of the wine industry"), Wine-Searcher won the Casa Ferreirinha Innovation Award. The Golden Vines Awards were voted for by more than 900 wine trade professionals from 104 countries, who completed detailed surveys for the 2022 Gérard Basset Global Fine Wine Report.
