= Rancho Caymus =

Mexican land grant in California

Coordinates: 38.420°N 122.370°W

Rancho Caymus was a 11,887-acre (48.10 km^{2}) Mexican land grant in present-day Napa County, California granted in 1836 by acting Governor Nicolás Gutiérrez to George C. Yount. Caymus was the name of a subgroup of Mishewal-Wappo Indians. The rancho was in the Napa Valley, and included present-day Yountville, Oakville and Rutherford, and the Napa Valley AVA wine region.

== History ==
Through the influence of Mariano Guadalupe Vallejo, George C. Yount received the two league Rancho Caymus in 1836, and became the first permanent Euro-American settler in the Napa Valley. In 1843 he received the one league Rancho La Jota on Howell Mountain to the north of Rancho Caymus.

With the cession of California to the United States following the Mexican-American War, the 1848 Treaty of Guadalupe Hidalgo provided that the land grants would be honored. As required by the Land Act of 1851, a claim for Rancho Caymus was filed with the Public Land Commission in 1852, and the Rancho Caymus grant was patented to George C. Yount in 1863.

A town known as Sebastopol was laid out on the property in 1855. However, the town of Sebastopol in nearby Sonoma County had already laid claim to this name, and the town was renamed Yountville in 1867 after George Yount’s death.

After George Yount’s death in 1865, the courts stepped in to sell the remaining portions of his property. Judge Serranus Hastings bought a large portion of the original Rancho Caymus. He later sold part of his property to Captain Gustave Niebaum and California State Senator Seneca Ewer.

== Historic sites of the Rancho ==
- George Yount Blockhouse. In 1836 George C.Yount built a blockhouse and in 1837 erected an adobe home.
- Grave of George C. Yount. Skilled hunter, frontiersman, craftsman, and farmer, George Calvert Yount (1794–1865) received the first Mexican land grant in Napa Valley.

== See also ==
- Ranchos of Napa County, California
- List of Ranchos of California
- Napa Valley topics
- Ranchos of California
