= George C. Yount =

California settler (1794–1865)

George Calvert Yount Jorge Concepción Yount
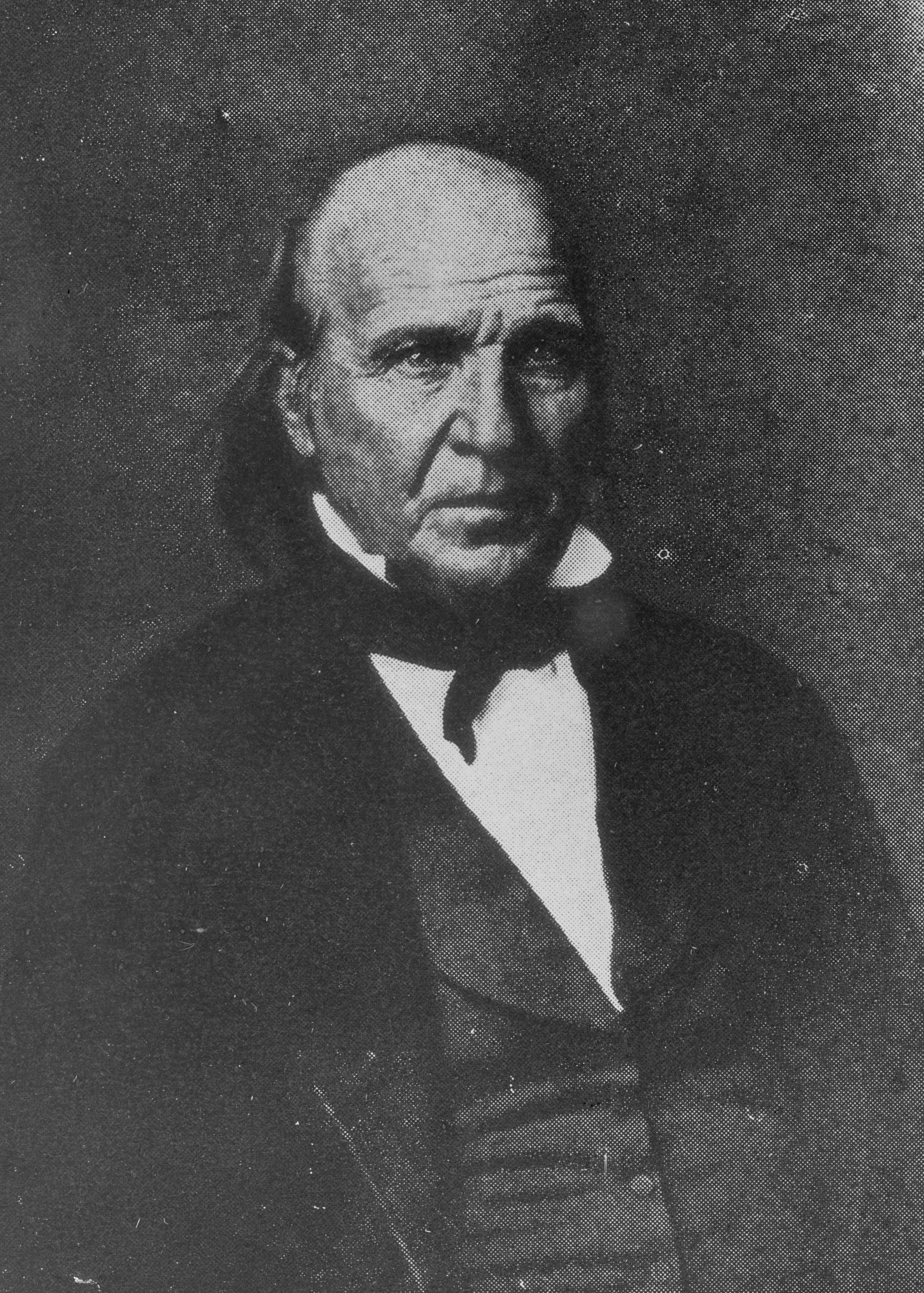
- Born: May 4, 1794; Burke County, North Carolina, US
- Died: October 5, 1865 (aged 71); Yountville, California, US
- Resting place: Yountville, California, US
- Spouse: Eliza Cambridge Wells
- Relatives: Harry Yount (nephew)

George Calvert Yount (May 4, 1794 – October 5, 1865), later known by his Spanish name Don Jorge Concepción Yount, was a Californian ranchero, fur trapper, and entrepreneur. Born in North Carolina, he later emigrated to Alta California, where he became a Mexican citizen and acquired substantial property holdings in the Napa Valley, largely due to the influence of his friendship with General Mariano G. Vallejo. The city of Yountville, California is named for him.

== Biography ==
George C. Yount was born in Burke County, North Carolina, but grew up in Missouri. He fought in the War of 1812 and the Indian wars. Yount was a farmer but in 1826, after business difficulties, left his wife and three children in Missouri, and went to Santa Fe and became a fur trapper.

Yount eventually made his way to California, arriving in 1831 with the Wolfskill party. He trapped sea otters on the Santa Barbara Channel Islands. He went to Sonoma in 1834, where he was employed as a carpenter by General Mariano Guadalupe Vallejo. Through the influence of Vallejo, Yount received the Rancho Caymus land grant in 1836, and became the first permanent settler in the Napa Valley. He built a cabin, or block-house and a grist-mill. In 1843 he received the Rancho La Jota land grant on the slope of the Howell Mountains north of Rancho Caymus, where he built a saw-mill. George C. Yount received a US patent on both of these grants with a total of 16,341 acres (25.5 sq mi).

George Yount recounted that, in early Spring of 1847, around the time the first relief party for the Donner Party was being organized, he had a repeated dream in which he saw a struggling group of pioneers in deep snow and other striking details of their appearance and difficulties. He may have heard of the plight of the Donner Party, which had been widely publicized by James Reed in San Francisco that winter. In Richard Henry Dana Jr.'s 1869 'Twenty-Four Years Later', Dana writes that Yount's dream was responsible for at least part of the rescue of the Donner Party. Dana refers to it as "[Yount's] celebrated dream, thrice repeated." Rev. Horace Bushnell's 1858 report of Yount's first-hand account places the location Yount saw in the dream in the wrong place from the Donner Party; however, Dana's 'Journal of a Voyage Round the World, 1859-1860' (published in 1968) makes it clear that Yount considered the dream as a helpful spiritual communication which led to relief to the Donner Party.

A town known as Sebastopol was laid out on the property in 1855. However, a town in nearby Sonoma County had already laid claim to this name, and the town was renamed Yountville in 1867 after George Yount's death.

His estate remained mostly intact during his lifetime, and Yount died on his property in 1865 at the age of 71.

== Family ==
George C. Yount and Eliza Cambridge Wilds had three children: Robert Wilds Yount (1819–1850), Frances Yount (1821–1870), and Elizabeth Ann Yount (1826–1853).

His nephew, Harry Yount, was a gamekeeper in Yellowstone National Park and is considered the first park ranger of the National Park Service.

Yount had left his family in Missouri in 1826. His two daughters, Elizabeth Ann and Frances, along with her husband William Bartlett Vines, came west with the Walker-Chiles Party of 1843. They lived in George Yount's blockhouse on Rancho Caymus.

== See also ==
- Harry Yount
