= Deer Park, California =

Deer Park
- census-designated place
- Location in Napa County and the state of California

- Location in the United States
- Coordinates: 38°32′14″N 122°28′21″W
- Country: United States
- State: California
- County: Napa

Area
  - Total: 5.62 sq mi (14.56 km^{2})
  - Land: 5.62 sq mi (14.55 km^{2})
  - Water: 0.0039 sq mi (0.01 km^{2}) 0.07%
- Elevation: 568 ft (173 m)

Population (2020)
  - Total: 1,294
  - Density: 230.4/sq mi (88.94/km^{2})
- Time zone: UTC-8 (Pacific (PST))
  - Summer (DST): UTC-7 (PDT)
- ZIP code: 94576
- Area code: 707
- FIPS code: 06-18324
- GNIS feature IDs: 1867011; 2408647

Deer Park is a census-designated place (CDP) in Napa County, California, United States. The population was 1,294 at the 2020 census. It is part of the Napa, California Metropolitan Statistical Area. Its area code is 707. Its ZIP code is 94576. It is in the Pacific time zone. Deer Creek is where Elmshaven, a large Victorian home lived in by Ellen White in the early twentieth century, is located.

== History ==
In August 2020, Deer Park was evacuated due to the Hennessey Fire, which resulted in the burning of over 315,000 acres (127,476 ha) in five counties, including near Deer Park.

The Glass Fire caused significant damage throughout Deer Park in late September 2020, destroying numerous houses as well as much of the Foothills Adventist Elementary School.

== Geography ==
Deer Park is located at 38°32′14″N 122°28′21″W (38.537257, -122.472386).

According to the United States Census Bureau, the CDP has a total area of 5.6 square miles (15 km^{2}), of which 99.93% is land and 0.07% is water.

== Demographics ==
Historical population
Census	Pop.	Note	%±
1980	1,454		—
1990	1,825		25.5%
2000	1,433		−21.5%
2010	1,267		−11.6%
2020	1,294		2.1%
U.S. Decennial Census; 1980; 1990 2000 2010

=== 2020 census ===
As of the 2020 census, Deer Park had a population of 1,294. The population density was 230.3 inhabitants per square mile (88.9/km^{2}). The age distribution was 190 people (14.7%) under the age of 18, 64 people (4.9%) aged 18 to 24, 239 people (18.5%) aged 25 to 44, 337 people (26.0%) aged 45 to 64, and 464 people (35.9%) who were 65 years of age or older. The median age was 56.0 years. For every 100 females, there were 79.2 males, and for every 100 females age 18 and over, there were 79.8 males age 18 and over.

The census reported that 85.9% of the population lived in households, 0.4% lived in non-institutionalized group quarters, and 13.7% were institutionalized. 44.7% of residents lived in urban areas, while 55.3% lived in rural areas.

There were 487 households, out of which 94 (19.3%) had children under the age of 18 living in them. Of these households, 218 (44.8%) were married-couple households, 31 (6.4%) were cohabiting couple households, 142 (29.2%) had a female householder with no partner present, and 96 (19.7%) had a male householder with no partner present. 166 households (34.1%) were one person, and 75 (15.4%) were one person aged 65 or older. The average household size was 2.28. There were 290 families (59.5% of all households).

There were 655 housing units at an average density of 116.6 units per square mile (45.0 units/km^{2}). Of those, 487 (74.4%) were occupied and 168 (25.6%) were vacant. Of occupied units, 281 (57.7%) were owner-occupied and 206 (42.3%) were occupied by renters. The homeowner vacancy rate was 1.7% and the rental vacancy rate was 5.9%.

Racial composition as of the 2020 census
Race	Number	Percent
White	940	72.6%
Black or African American	21	1.6%
American Indian and Alaska Native	13	1.0%
Asian	69	5.3%
Native Hawaiian and Other Pacific Islander	7	0.5%
Some other race	106	8.2%
Two or more races	138	10.7%
Hispanic or Latino (of any race)	251	19.4%

== Government ==
In the California State Legislature, Deer Park is in the 3rd senatorial district, represented by Democrat Christopher Cabaldon, and in the 4th Assembly district, represented by Democrat Cecilia Aguiar-Curry.

In the United States House of Representatives, Deer Park is in California's 4th congressional district, represented by Democrat Mike Thompson.
