= Wild Horse Valley AVA =

American Viticultural Area in Napa County, California

Coordinates: 38°20′36″N 122°12′05″W

Wild Horse Valley
- Wine region
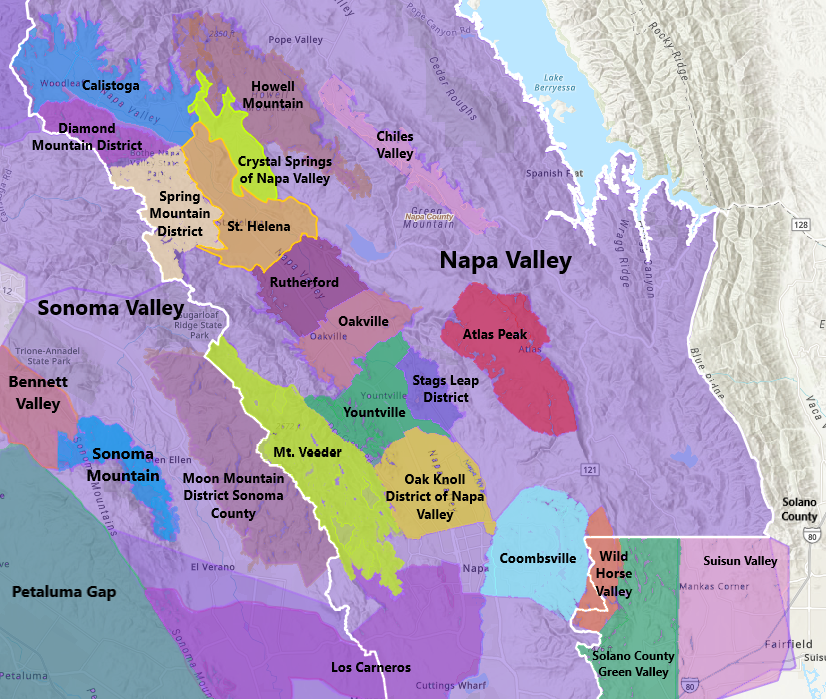
- Type: American Viticultural Area
- Year established: 1988
- Years of wine industry: 145
- Country: United States
- Part of: California, North Coast AVA, Napa County, Solano County, Napa Valley AVA
- Growing season: 273 days
- Climate region: Region I
- Heat units: 2100-2500 GDD units
- Precipitation (annual average): 32 inches (813 mm)
- Soil conditions: Primarily shallow, well-drained, sloping stony loams of the Hambright-Toomes association found only in mountainous uplands
- Total area: 3,300 acres (5.2 sq mi)
- Size of planted vineyards: 73 acres (30 ha)
- No. of vineyards: 3
- Grapes produced: Chardonnay, Gewurztraminer, Pinot Noir, Riesling
- No. of wineries: 1

Wild Horse Valley is an American Viticultural Area (AVA) that straddles between Napa and Solano Counties, California and partly resides within the larger Napa Valley AVA. The wine appellation was established as the nation's 102^{nd}, the state's 58^{th}, and both counties' fifth AVA on November 30, 1988 by the Bureau of Alcohol, Tobacco and Firearms (ATF), Treasury after reviewing the petition submitted by John Newmeyer of Napa and four other interested persons proposing the viticultural area named "Wild Horse Valley."

The appellation encompasses a valley landform near the city of Napa that extends approximately five-and-a-third-mile (9 km) long and one-and-two-thirds-mile (3 km) across at its widest point. The petition states Wild Horse Valley's total acreage is 3,300 acres (5 sq mi) with 73 acres (30 ha) of cultivation in the viticultural area. Its southerly location results in more hours of sunshine than other locations in Napa Valley and the adjacent Solano County Green Valley. The proximity to San Pablo Bay results in a cooler climate, making Wild Horse Valley attractive for the cultivation of grapes like Pinot noir. The Wild Horse Valley viticultural area is within the North Coast viticultural area. Wild Horse Valley partially overlaps the Napa Valley and Solano County Green Valley viticultural areas. The Suisun Valley viticultural area is approximately 2.5 miles (4 km) east of the Wild Horse Valley separated only by the Solano County Green Valley.

== Trademark Issue ==
The Santa Lucia Winery registered the trademark "Wild Horse" under the Lanham Act, 15 U.S.C. Chapter 22, in 1985. Santa Lucia contends that use of the viticultural designation "Wild Horse Valley" by other parties will infringe upon their Federally registered trademark. It is not the policy of ATF to become involved in purely private disputes involving proprietary rights, such as trademark infringement suits. However, in the event a direct conflict arises between some or all of the rights granted by a registered trademark under the Lanham Act and the right to use the name of a viticultural area established under the FAA Act, it is the position of ATF that the rights applicable to the viticultural area should control. ATF believes that the evidence submitted by the petitioner establishes that designation of the Wild Horse Valley viticultural area is in conformance with the law and regulations. Accordingly, ATF finds that Federal registration of the term "Wild Horse" does not limit the Bureau's authority to establish a viticultural area known as Wild Horse Valley.
Finally, the Santa Lucia Winery will not be precluded from using the designation "Wild Horse" and a brand name on wine labels following issuance of this regulation. Pursuant to 27 CFR 4.39(i), a brand name of geographical significance may be used if it previously appeared on labels approved prior to *July 7, 1986, and if the wine is also labeled with an appellation of origin (or some other statement which the Director finds to be sufficient to dispel the brand name's geographic connotation). Since Santa Lucia has been using their trademark "Wild Horse" since 1985, they may continue to use this brand name as long as the requirements of § 4.39(i) are satisfied.

== History ==
The name "Wild Horse Valley" is well documented as evident in the petition providing references to books identifying the area as Wild Horse Valley as early as 1866. According to early accounts, wild horses roamed the area during that period, thus the name "Wild Horse Valley" was coined. Today, the name Wild Horse Valley is found on U.S.G.S. maps and on Napa County road maps. One of the two roads leading to the valley is named "Wild Horse Valley Road," and a creek flowing from the southeast portion of the valley into Solano County Green Valley, is named "Wild Horse Creek." The large, locally known horse ranch and equestrian center, Wild Horse Valley Ranch, located at the north portion of the valley, has given the name ample publicity in recent years.
The first vineyard used for wine production in Wild Horse Valley was that of Joseph Vorbe who in 1881 had 50 acres (20 ha). The wine historian, William F. Heintz, published a report entitled, "Wild Horse Valley's Viticultural History." Part of the report describes the historical use of the name Wild Horse Valley, as well as its viticultural significance. The current vineyard plantings date back to 1980, with commercial production starting in 1985.

== Terroir ==
=== Geography ===
Wild Horse Valley AVA features two distinct sub-regions. To the west, the area is cooled by San Pablo Bay, although the elevation keeps the area above the fogline. The eastern half, being protected by the slope of the ground, is much warmer. The soil type is generally volcanic throughout the entire AVA.

=== Climate ===
Napa County can be divided into four major plant climate zones: Maritime, Coastal, Transitional and Interior, depending largely on the degree of ocean influence.

The Maritime area includes all of the county lying south of the city of Napa. The day verses night temperature is a narrow range as is the seasonal change. Summer fog is characteristic of the area. This area is best suited for the early ripening grapes such as Pinot Noir and Chardonnay.
The second area is called the Coastal zone and extends from Napa to about Lodi Lane, north of St. Helena, and from the hills on the cast to the Sonoma County line. This zone can also be subdivided into a cooler southern section (Napa to Yountville) and a warmer section north of the summer fog line which stops at the Yountville Hills. This coastal zone is suitable for growing both early and late ripening varieties of good quality.
The valley north of Lodi Lane through Calistoga to the north end of the county falls into the Transitional zone, and is best suited for later maturing varieties. Pope, Berryessa and Chiles valleys and surrounding areas are in the Interior zone which is the least infiuenccd by the ocean air and dominated by the continental air. There are small microclimnate differences to exposure, air drainage and elevation of soil type and moisture can materially within a zone.

The valleys in the Coast Ranges east of the City of Napa generally tend to have a drier, more continental climate than the Napa Valley floor and vineyard sites in the mountains to the west. Many factors, including distance from sources of marine air, sunny exposure, and heat-absorbing rocky outcroppings, contribute to warmer summertime temperatures. Because of its location, Wild Horse Valley is an exception to this generalization. The area of southern Napa Valley and Wild Horse Valley have lower annual temperatures and smaller annual temperature ranges as compared with the northern Napa Valley and most of the eastern coast ranges of Napa County, which have higher annual temperatures and larger annual temperature ranges. Wild Horse Valley's southerly location near San Pablo and Suisun Bays exposes it to cool westerly winds blowing in from the ocean and the bay, especially in spring and summer. Its proximity to the Carquinez Straits and its unprotected position rising out of bay shore flatlands on two sides make Wild Horse Valley an unusually windy location. This air movement combines with the marine breezes to make Wild Horse Valley windier than the lower elevation of the Coombsville area of Napa Valley to the west, and the more Inland coast range mountains and valleys to the north, and 'the more sheltered Solano County Green Valley viticultural area. The Wild Horse Valley viticultural area also enjoys longer hours of sunlight than Coombsville area and Green Valley. Summer fogs that blanket the lower elevations often stop below the altitude of Wild Horse Valley. In spite of the longer period of daylight, Wild Horse Valley's customary cool winds keep afternoon temperatures low. A thermograph study done in 1965 at the ranch of James Birkmyer in the north end of the valley indicated that this site has a Region I climate (less than 2,500 degree days) as classified by the University of California at Davis system of heat summation. The predominant climate of the Wild Horse Valley viticultural area and the predominant climate of the overlapping Solano County Green Valley are different. Available thermograph studies (1973-74) of Solano County Green Valley, places the climate of this viticultural area in mid-Region II. Solano County Green Valley is more sheltered and on the average, warmer than Wild Horse Valley. The 1,000-to-2,000-foot (305–610 m) elevation of the Wild Horse Valley viticultural area is generally higher than the surrounding valleys. Many areas of Solano County Green Valley have much lower elevations than Wild Horse Valley, ranging from 400 to 1,800 feet (122–549 m) above sea level. Because of the difference in elevation, fog is more prevalent in Solano County Green Valley than in Wild Horse Valley. The average annual rainfall in Solano County Green Valley is 20 to 25 inches (508–635 mm) per year. Over the last twenty years the rainfall in Wild Horse Valley has averaged 32 inches (813 mm) per year. The plant hardiness zone ranges from 9b to 10a.

=== Soils ===
The soils in Wild Horse Valley also set it apart from neighboring areas. The soils in Wild Horse Valley are primarily shallow, well-drained, sloping stony loams of the Hambright-Toomes association found only in mountainous uplands. Specific Wild Horse Valley soil types include Hambright, Toomes, Gilroy, Coombs, Sobrante and Trimmer loams. The soil in the overlapping Solano County Green Valley is primarily Conejo clay loam, a nearly level, deep, fine-textured alluvial soil found only at low elevations. Soil in the nearby Coombsville area of Napa Valley immediately west of Wild Horse Valley consists of Coombs loam with areas of Kidd, Haire, Forward, and Sobrante soils. The soils found in other Napa County areas to the north and east are primarily Yolo loam, Pleasanton loam, Diablo clay and Millsholm loam in the Cappel Valley. In Foss Valley they consist of Maxwell clay, Bale clay loam and Aiken loam. In Gordon Valley they are mostly Bale clay loam, Cole silt loam, Yolo loam and Bressa-Dibble complex. In Wooden Valley they mostly are Bale clay loam, Sobrante loam, Cole silt loam, Hair clay loam, Diablo clay, Clear Lake clay and Bressa-Dibble complex. In Chiles Valley they are primarily Pleasanton loam, Perkins gravelly loam, Henneke gravelly loam, Tehma silt loam, Maxwell clay and Bressa-Dibble complex. In Pope Valley the soils consist primarily of Pleasanton loam, Perkins gravelly loam, Henneke gravelly loam, Tehema silt loam, Maxwell clay and Bressa-Dibble complex.

== Viticulture ==
Wild Horse Valley is a unique and distinctive grapegrowing area. The largest vineyard in the AVA is the 950-acre (1.5 sq mi) Wild Horse Vineyard of Napa Valley, founded in 1978, with 28 acres (11 ha) cultivating Gewurztraminer, Riesling and Chardonnay. Due to its unique microclimate as the coolest region in the Napa Valley, the distinctiveness of Wild Horse Valley is the high acidity and low pH of its fruit, which is almost exclusively Chardonnay and Pinot Noir.
