= Napa Valley AVA =

American Viticultural Area in California

Coordinates: 38°24′04″N 122°19′49″W

Napa Valley
- Wine region
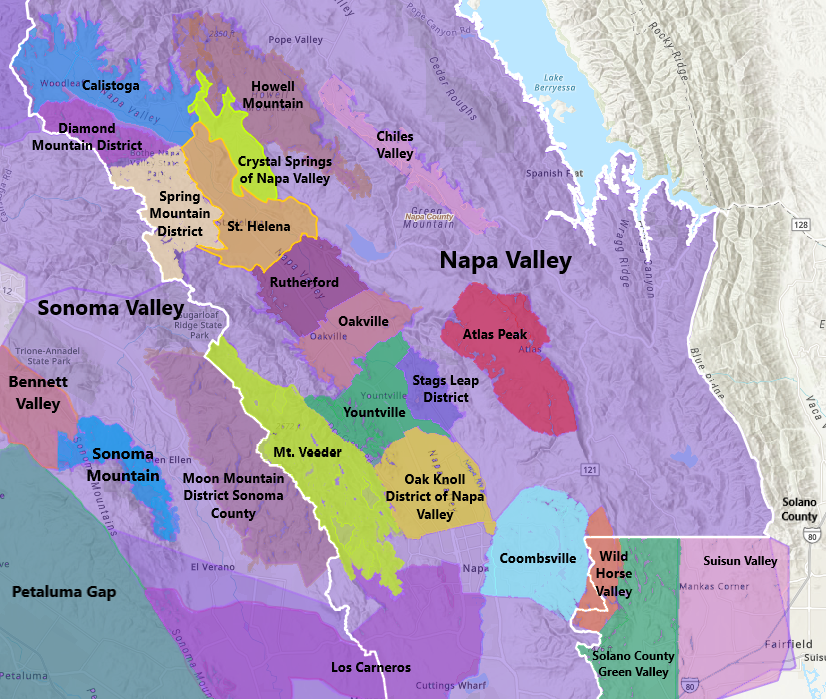
- Type: American Viticultural Area
- Year established: 1981
- Years of wine industry: 188
- Country: United States
- Part of: California, North Coast AVA, Napa County
- Sub-regions: Los Carneros AVA, Howell Mountain AVA, Wild Horse Valley AVA, Stags Leap District AVA, Mt. Veeder AVA, Atlas Peak AVA, Spring Mountain District AVA, Oakville AVA, Rutherford AVA, St. Helena AVA, Chiles Valley AVA, Yountville AVA, Diamond Mountain District AVA, Coombsville AVA, Oak Knoll District of Napa Valley AVA, Calistoga AVA, Crystal Springs of Napa Valley AVA
- Growing season: 215-260 days
- Climate region: Region I-III
- Precipitation (annual average): 24 to 55 inches (610–1,397 mm)
- Soil conditions: Very gravelly loams to loams, clay loams and clays}
- Total area: 252,541 acres (395 sq mi)
- Size of planted vineyards: 47,216 acres (19,108 ha)
- No. of vineyards: 700
- Varietals produced: Cabernet Sauvignon, Merlot, Cabernet Franc, Pinot noir, Zinfandel, Chardonnay, Sauvignon blanc, and more
- No. of wineries: 475

Napa Valley is an American Viticultural Area (AVA) in Napa County, California. It was established as the nation's second, the state and county's initial appellation on January 28, 1981 by the U.S. Bureau of Alcohol, Tobacco and Firearms (ATF), Treasury after reviewing the 1978 petition submitted by the Napa Valley Vintners and the Napa Valley Grape Growers Association proposing the viticultural area named "Napa Valley."

The appellation is internationally renowned as one of the world's premier wine regions and includes all of Napa County except the portion northeast of Putah Creek and Lake Berryessa.

Napa's viticulture history dates back to the nineteenth century, and its modern premium wine production reemerged in the 1960s. The combination of Mediterranean climate, geography, and geology of the region is conducive to growing quality wine grapes.

George C. Yount was the first vineyardist on record in Napa Valley, planting his vines in 1838. John Patchett established the Napa Valley's first commercial vineyard in 1858. In 1861, Charles Krug established another of Napa Valley's first commercial wineries in St. Helena. By 1880, its first great period of prominence, the Napa Valley had 443 vineyards with a thousand or more vines each. Of these major holdings, 72 were in the Calistoga district, 126 were in Napa City, and 245 were in the St. Helena area. Viticulture in Napa suffered several setbacks in the late 19th and early 20th centuries, including an outbreak of the vine disease phylloxera, national enactment of Prohibition, and the Great Depression. The modern wine industry in Napa Valley gradually recovered, gaining immediate recognition at the Paris Wine Tasting of 1976 where Napa Valley vintages scored top honors against premier French wines. Napa Valley is now a major international enotourism destination. The USDA plant hardiness zones range is 9a to 10a.

== History ==
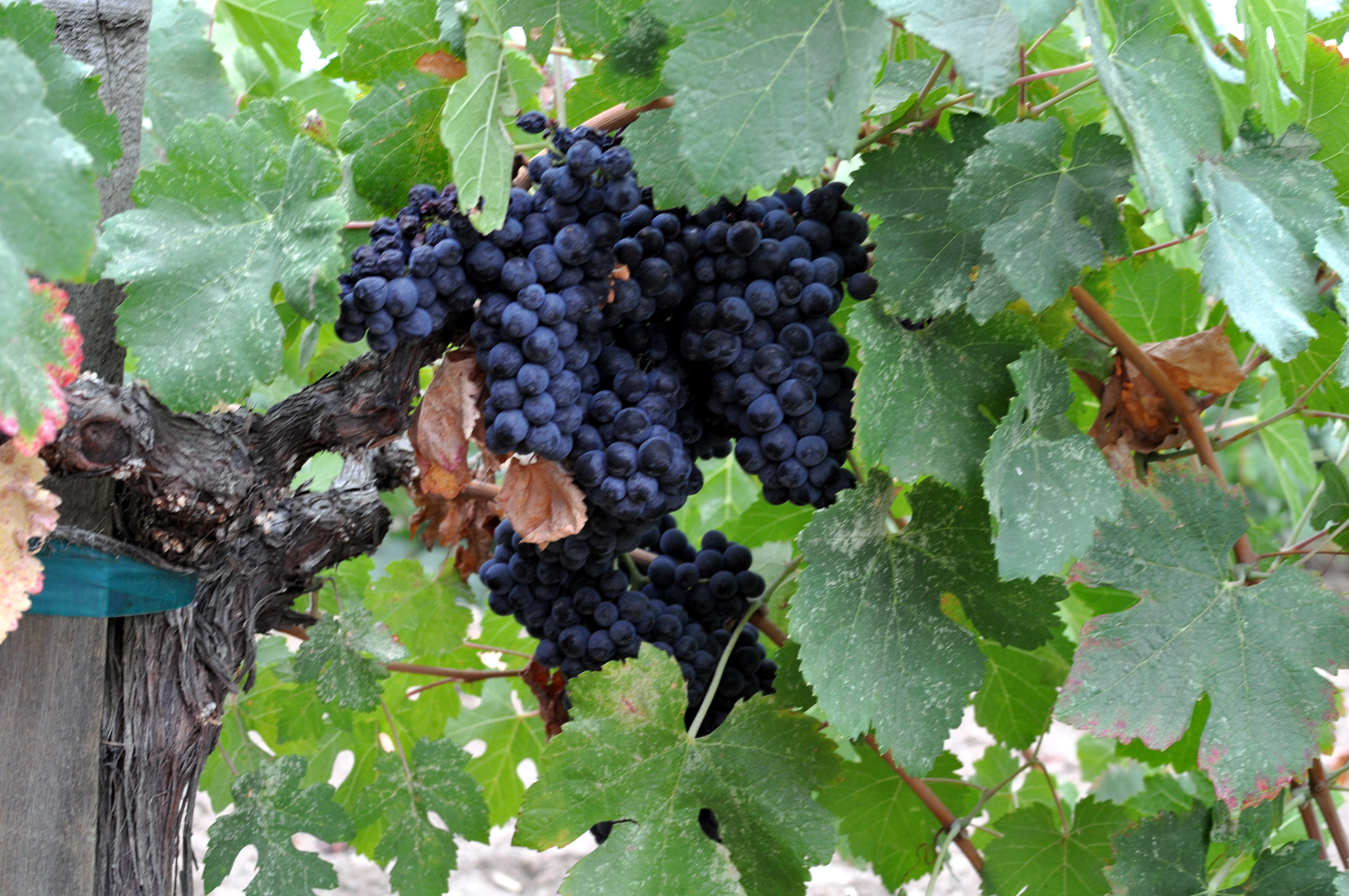
Grapes in a Napa Valley vineyard

=== Early years ===
Early settler and pioneer vineyardist George C. Yount is generally credited as the first to plant grapevines in Napa Valley in 1838. In 1864, on the marriage of one of his granddaughters to Thomas Rutherford, Yount gave the couple around 1,000 acres (2 sq mi) of land, which Rutherford dedicated to viticulture. Other pioneers followed in the 1840s and 1850s, by which time vineyards were established in and around Napa City and up the length of the valley to Calistoga. Commercial production began in 1858, with John Patchett selling wine for $2 per gallon. His wine cellar, built in 1859, narrowly predates one in St. Helena, established by Charles Krug in 1861 and commonly cited as the Napa Valley's first winery.

Captain Gustave Niebaum established Inglenook Winery in 1879 near the village of Rutherford. This was the first Bordeaux style winery in the US. Inglenook wines won gold medals at the 1889 World's Fair in Paris.

In 1868 H. W. Crabb bought land near Oakville close to the Napa River. Crabb established a vineyard and winery named To Kalon, and by 1877 had planted 130 acres (0.5 km^{2}) and was producing 50,000 US gallons of wine per year. Crabb experimented with over 400 grape varieties to find the types best suited for the area.

By 1880, its first great period of prominence, the Napa Valley had 443 vineyards with a thousand or more vines each. Of these major holdings, 72 were in the Calistoga district, 126 were in Napa City, and 245 were in the St. Helena area. At the end of the nineteenth century, there were more than one hundred and forty wineries in the area. Of those original wineries, several still exist in the valley today including Beaulieu, Beringer, Charles Krug, Chateau Montelena, Far Niente, Mayacamas, Markham Vineyards, and Schramsberg Vineyards.

=== Phylloxera, Prohibition and the Great Depression ===
Viticulture in Napa suffered several setbacks in the late 19th and early 20th centuries. The Phylloxera louse killed many of the vines throughout the valley. Prohibition, enacted in 1920, caused many wineries to shut down. A few remained open with agreements to produce sacramental wine. Growers who elected to keep their vines planted sold their crops to home winemakers. The Great Depression slowed the wine business further. These events stalled the growth of the wine industry in Napa County, California for years.

=== Modern era ===
André Tchelistcheff is generally credited with ushering in the modern era of winemaking in California. Beaulieu hired Tchelisticheff in 1938. He introduced several techniques and procedures to the region, such as aging wine in small French Oak barrels, cold fermentation, vineyard frost prevention, and malolactic fermentation.

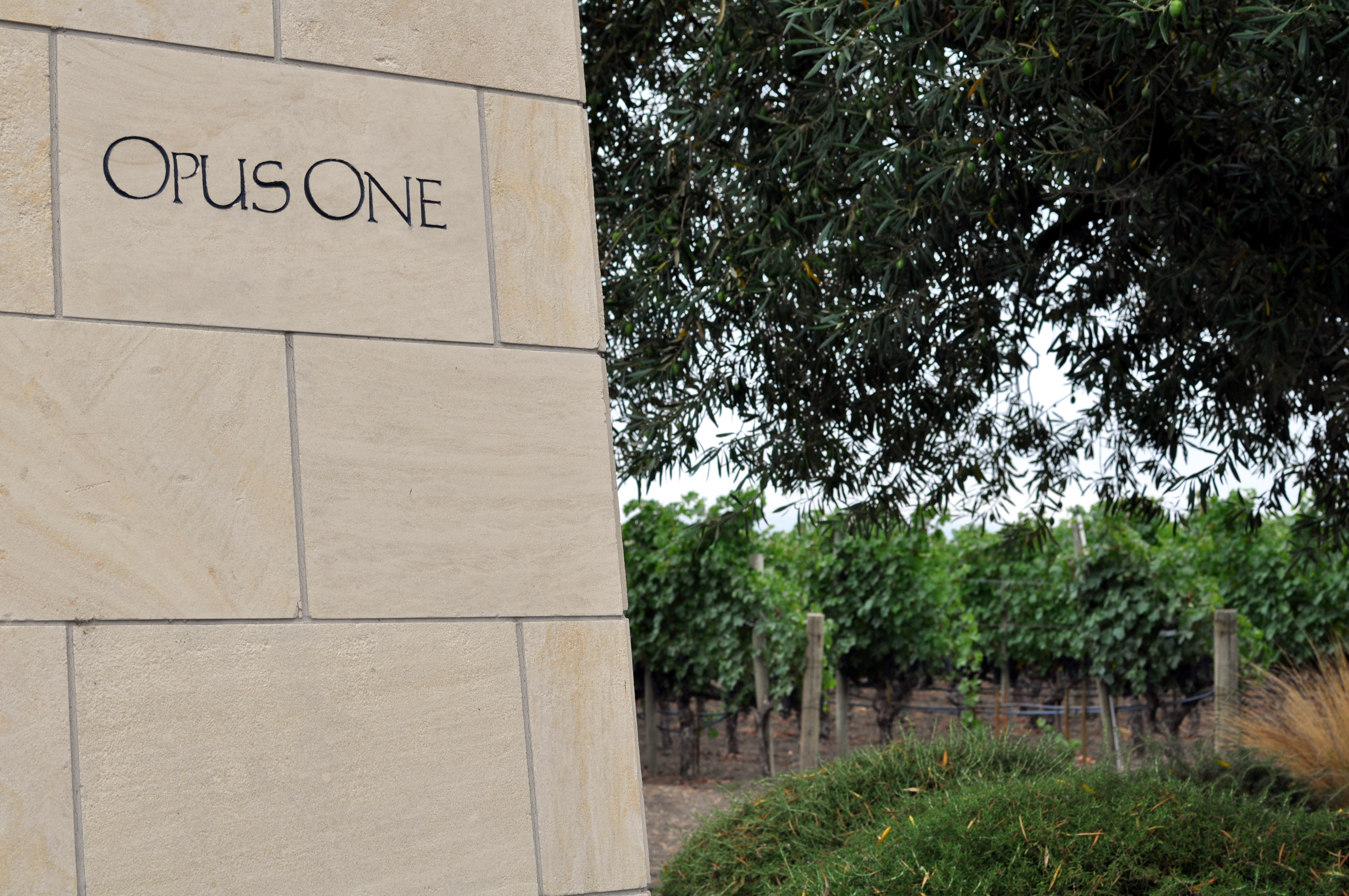
Opus One vineyard in Napa Valley

Following Prohibition, Beringer Vineyards invited attendees of the Golden Gate International Exposition to visit the winery using promotional maps printed with the phrase "All roads lead to Beringer" in 1939. The winery also invited Hollywood stars, including Clark Gable, Charles Laughton, and Carole Lombard to visit. These early promotions are considered to be the birth of wine-based tourism that became a major part of the Napa Valley economy.

Brother Timothy of Christian Brothers winery was also instrumental in establishing the modern wine industry in Napa. After an earlier career as a teacher, he transferred to the order's Mont La Salle, located on Mount Veeder in the Mayacamas Mountains northwest of Napa in 1935 to become the wine chemist for the order's expanding wine operations. Christian Brothers had grown grapes and made sacramental wine in Benicia, California during Prohibition, but decided to branch out into commercial production of wine and brandy after the Repeal of Prohibition. The science teacher was a fast learner and soon established Christian Brothers as one of the leading brands in the state's budding wine industry. Brother Timothy's smiling face in advertisements and promotional materials became one of the most familiar images for wine consumers across the country. Following the Second World War, the wine industry in Napa began to thrive again.

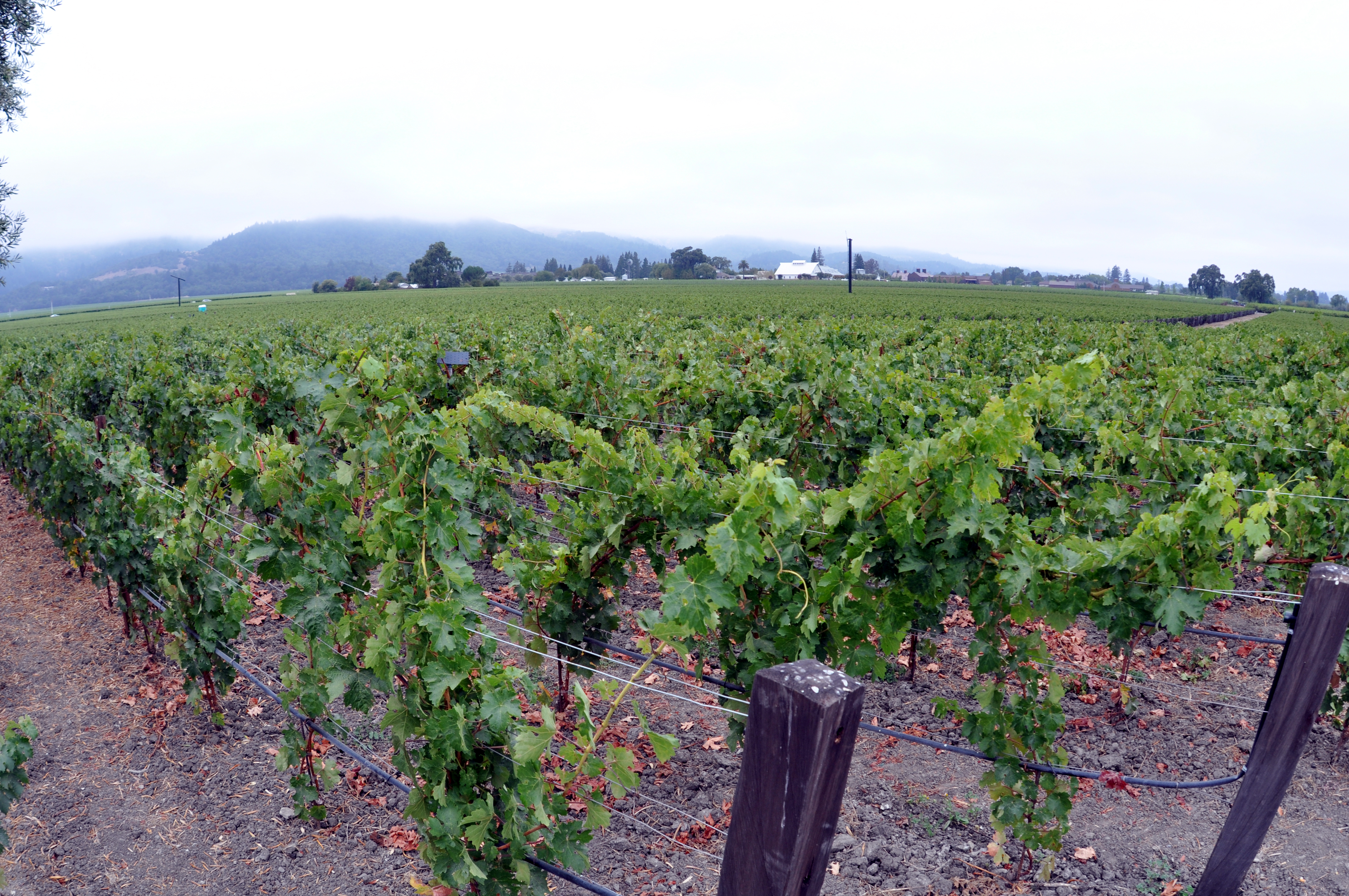
Opus One vineyard

In 1965, Napa Valley icon Robert Mondavi broke away from his family's Charles Krug estate to start his own winemaking operation in Oakville. It was the first new large-scale winery to be established in the valley since Prohibition and included the original To Kalon land. After this, the number of wineries in the valley grew rapidly, as did the region's reputation.

=== Napa Valley as a top wine region ===
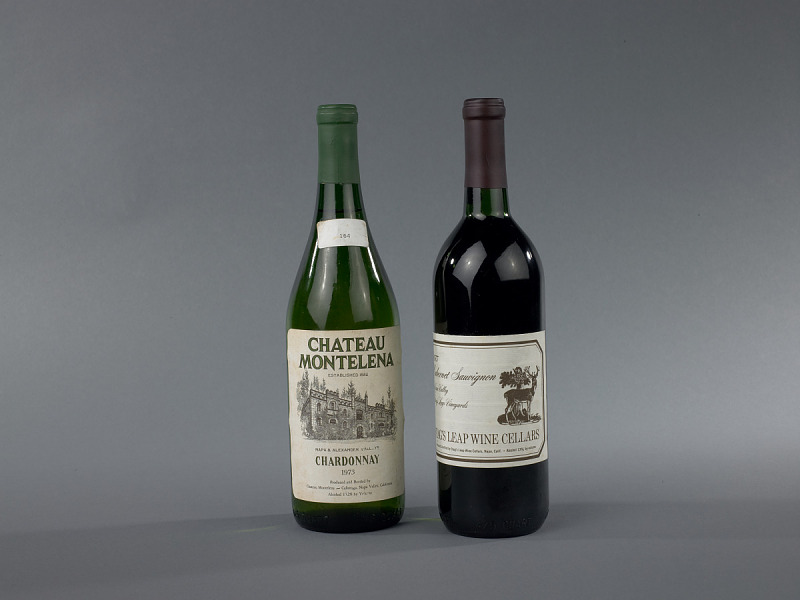
1976 Paris Wine Tasting Winners

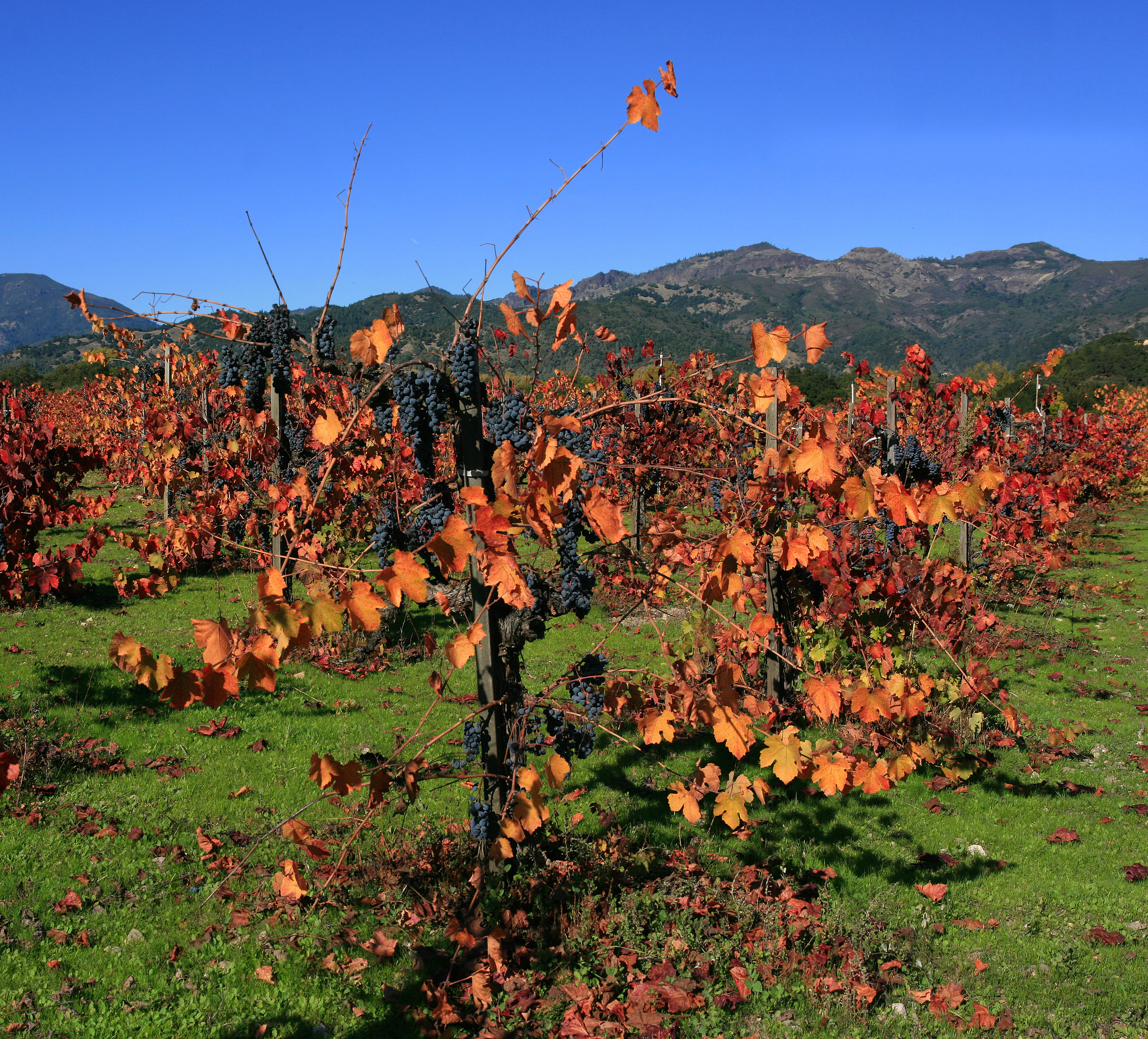
Mature Napa vines

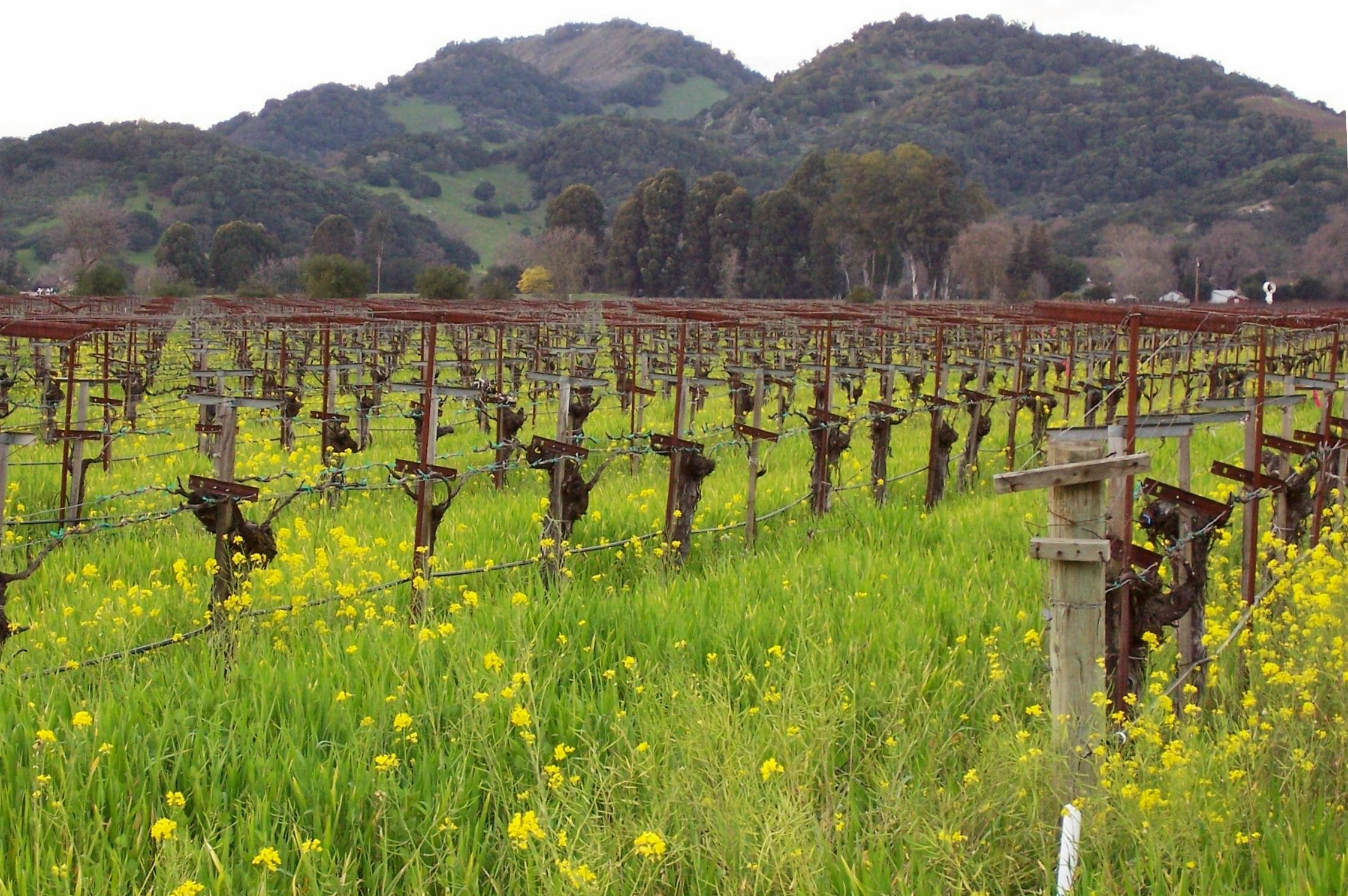

During the Bicentennial, the region gained international recognition from the Paris Wine Tasting of 1976 when featured Napa Valley Chardonnay and Cabernet Sauvignon vintages ranked #1 honors, scored by renowned French oenophiles, besting several famous French labels in a blind tasting format. The news of the wine competition, termed the "Judgment of Paris", was immediately published by a Time magazine article and later portrayed in the 2008 Hollywood film, Bottle Shock. The results of the momentous event established Napa's international reputation as a premier wine-producing region.

A modern outbreak of phylloxera was discovered in the valley in 1983 in a vineyard planted with AxR1 rootstock. Many growers seized upon this outbreak as an opportunity to switch to varieties that were better suited to the climate and soil. By the late 1990s about 75% of the affected vineyards had been replanted with phylloxera resistant rootstock. The growers in the region have since channeled their energy to battle the Glassy-winged sharpshooter, a non-native pest that carries Pierce's disease.

A trend of larger national and international companies like E & J Gallo Winery, Diageo, and Constellation Brands buying smaller wineries, vineyards, and brands began to gain momentum in the early part of the 21st century. Today Napa Valley features more than 450 wineries that grow grape varieties including Cabernet Sauvignon, Chardonnay, Pinot noir, Merlot, Zinfandel, among others. While winemakers may produce wines from specific AVAs within the valley, many wines are made as a blend from grapes grown on the valley floor and the surrounding hillsides.

== Geography ==
The valley floor is flanked by the Mayacamas Range on the western and northern sides and the Vaca Mountains on the eastern side. Several smaller valleys exist within these two ranges. The floor of the main valley gradually rises from sea level at the southern end to 362 feet (110 m) above sea level at the northern end in Calistoga at the base of Mount Saint Helena. The Oakville and Rutherford viticultural areas lie within a geographical area known as the Rutherford Bench in the center of the valley floor. The soil in the southern end of the valley consists mainly of sediments deposited by earlier advances and retreats of San Pablo Bay while the soil at the northern end of the valley contains a large volume of volcanic lava and ash. Several of the small hills that emerge from the middle of the valley floor near Yountville are indicators of the region's volcanic past.

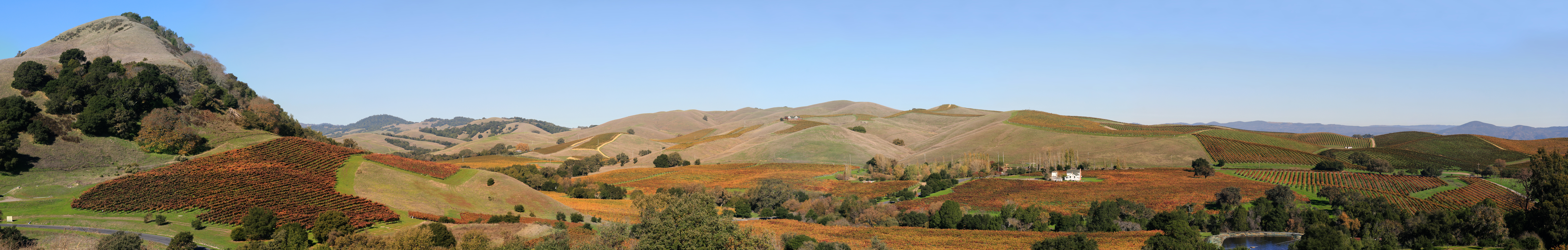

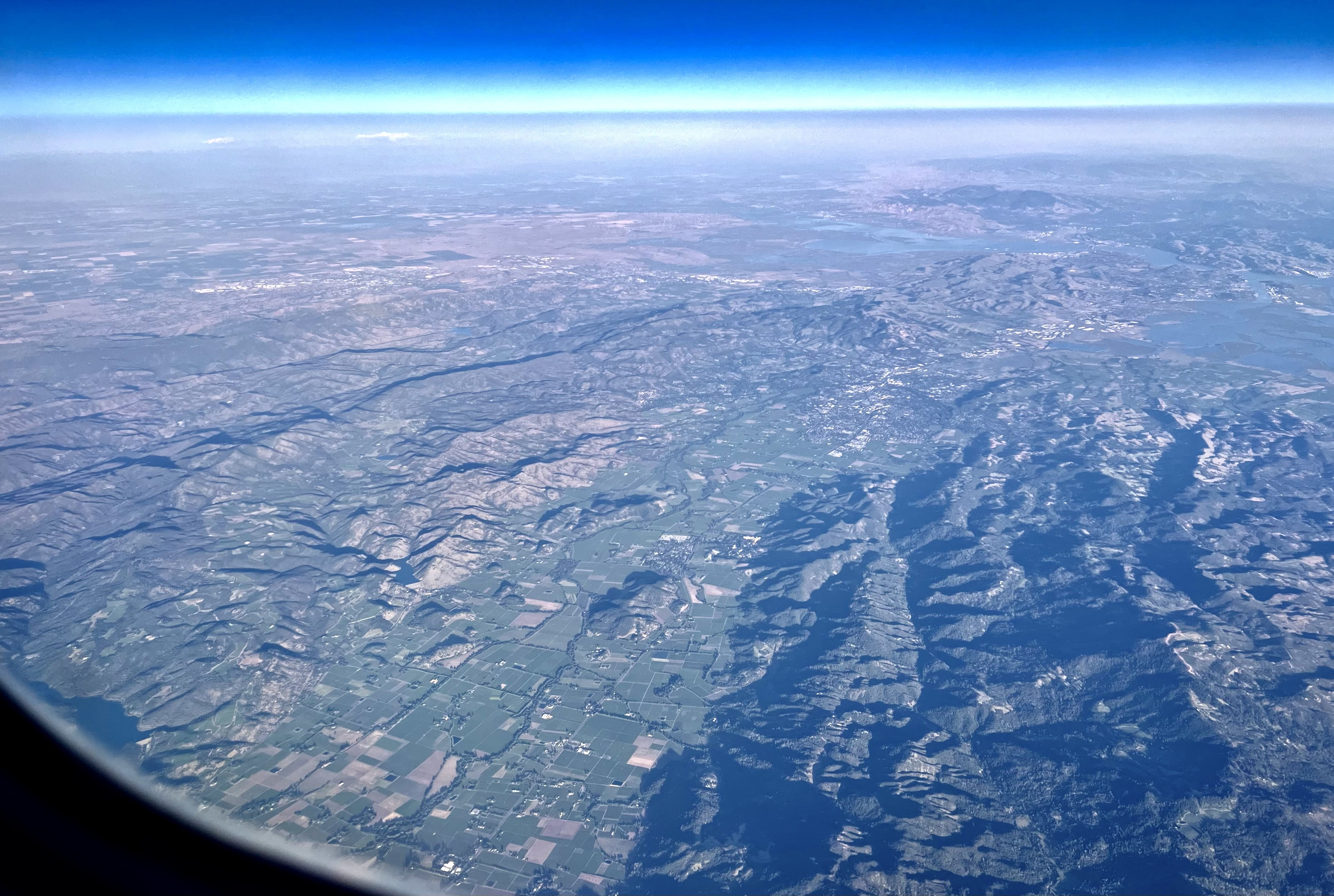
Looking south on Napa Valley, (image center) with Suisan Bay and Grizzly Bay distant in the upper right.

=== Climate ===
Several mesoclimates exist within the area due to various weather and geographical influences. The open southern end of the valley floor is cooler during the growing season due to the proximity of San Pablo Bay, while the sheltered, closed northern end is often much warmer. The eastern side of the valley tends to be more arid due to the rain shadow caused by the western mountains and hills.

Napa Valley's climate and geography are shaped by a unique cooling effect, crucial for premium grape growing. Originating from a cold ocean current from Alaska, this effect involves fog formation and cool air influx from the Pacific, offset by warmer air rising from California's Central Valley. This dynamic results in a climate system where fog and cooler sea air are drawn inland through valleys, creating ideal conditions for high-quality viticulture. The region's complexity extends to varying topography, sun exposure, and diverse soils, contributing to a wide array of microclimates or terroirs within a relatively small viticulture area. Napa Valley, despite its linear appearance, is a tapestry of climate influences from the adjacent Vaca and Mayacamas mountain ranges, alongside varied lithologies influencing vineyard substrates. This geographical diversity, coupled with the Mediterranean climate characterized by hot, dry summers and cool, wet winters, impacts grape growing in the Napa Valley. Rainfall distribution and the daily summer fog, which typically shrouds the valley until mid-morning, vary across the region, affecting grape variety and quality. However, the potential impacts of climate change pose new challenges: rising global temperatures and possible disruptions to the cooling effect could alter the conditions that have historically favored premium grape growing in Napa Valley.

== Wine tourism ==
More than 4.5 million people visit Napa Valley each year, making it a very popular tourist destination in California.

== American Viticultural Areas (AVAs) of Napa Valley ==
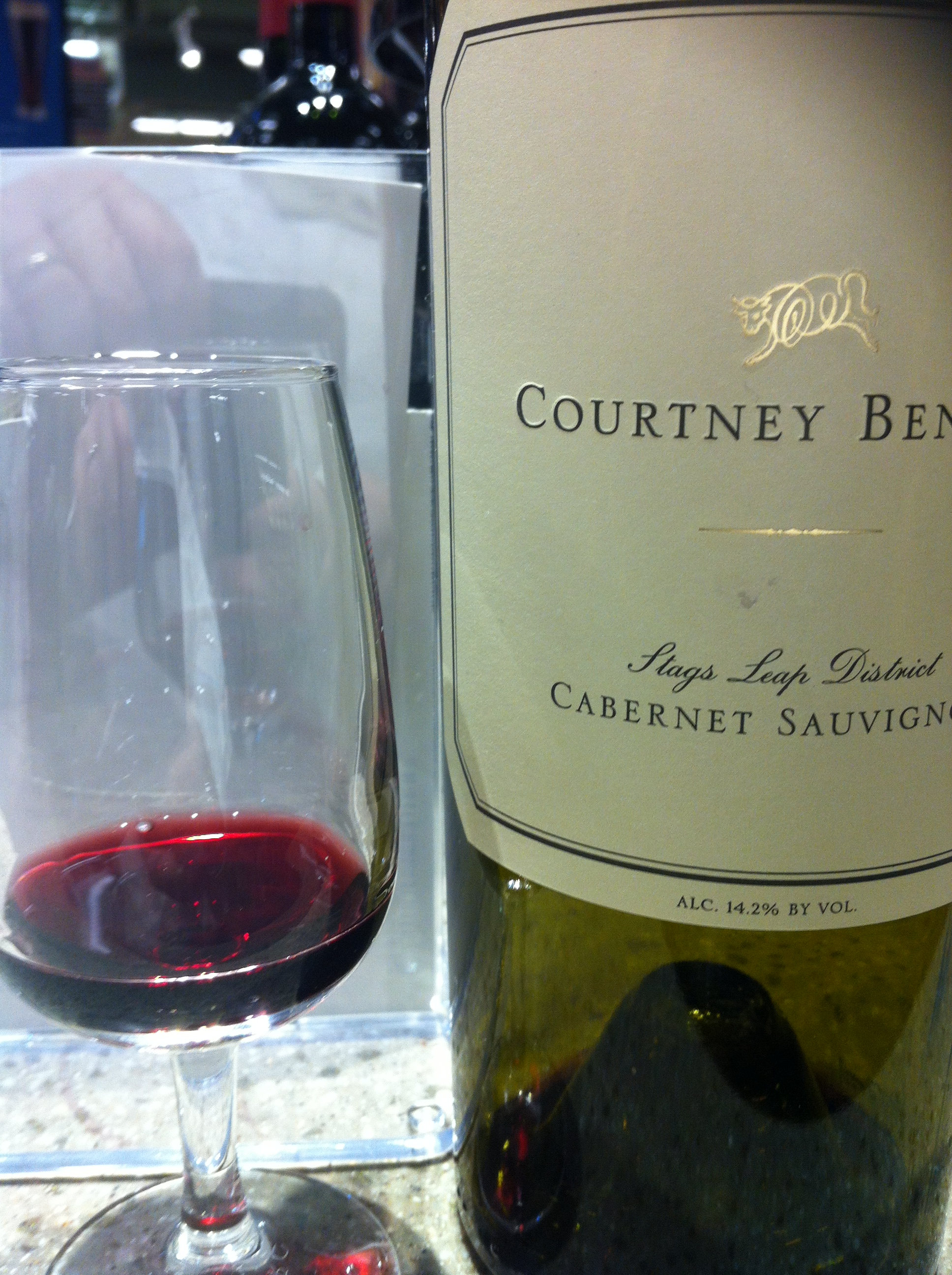
A Cabernet Sauvignon from the Stags Leap District of Napa Valley

As of 2024, within Napa Valley AVA, there are seventeen sub-AVAs:

Area	Date established
Los Carneros (Carneros)	Aug 18, 1983
Howell Mountain	Dec 30, 1983
Wild Horse Valley	Nov 30, 1988
Stags Leap District	Jan 27, 1989
Mt. Veeder	Feb 20, 1990
Atlas Peak	Jan 22, 1992
Spring Mountain District	May 13, 1993
Oakville	Jul 2, 1993
Rutherford	Jul 2, 1993
St. Helena	Sep 11, 1995
Chiles Valley	Feb 17, 1999
Yountville	Mar 19, 1999
Diamond Mountain District	Jun 1, 2001
Oak Knoll District	Feb 25, 2004
Calistoga	Dec 8, 2009
Coombsville	Dec 14, 2011
Crystal Springs	Nov 15, 2024

== See also ==
- California wine
- Coast Ranges (California)
- Geography of California
- Napa County wine
- Napa Valley Wine Train
- Sonoma County wine
