= Mankas Corner, California =

Unincorporated community in California, United States

Mankas Corner
- Unincorporated community
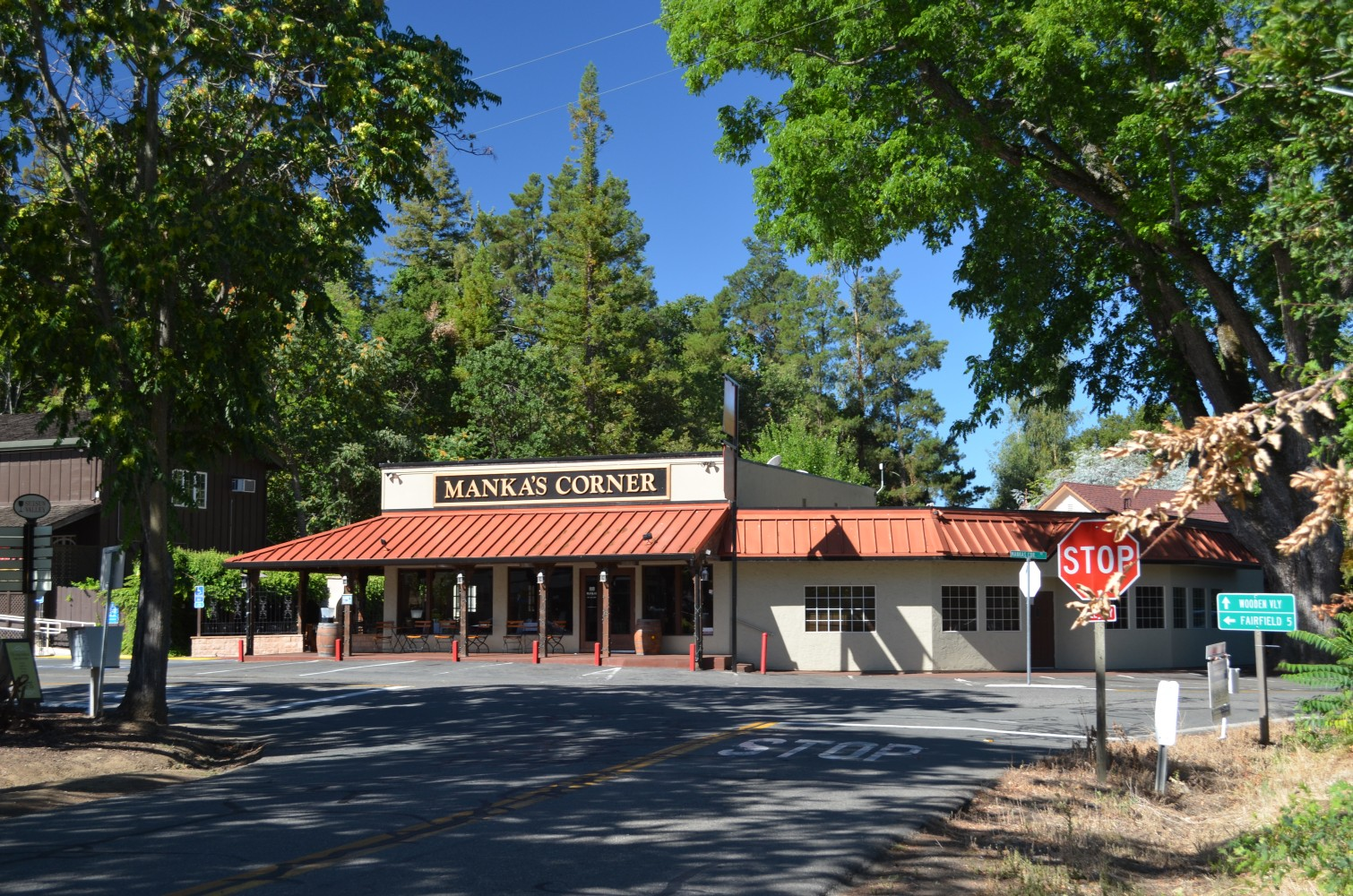
- A restaurant in Mankas Corner

- Location in California Mankas Corner (the United States)
- Coordinates: 38.2863023°N 122.1069130°W
- Country: United States
- State: California
- County: Solano
- Elevation: 128 ft (39 m)

Mankas Corner is an unincorporated community in the Suisun Valley AVA, an American Viticulture Area, in Solano County, California, United States.

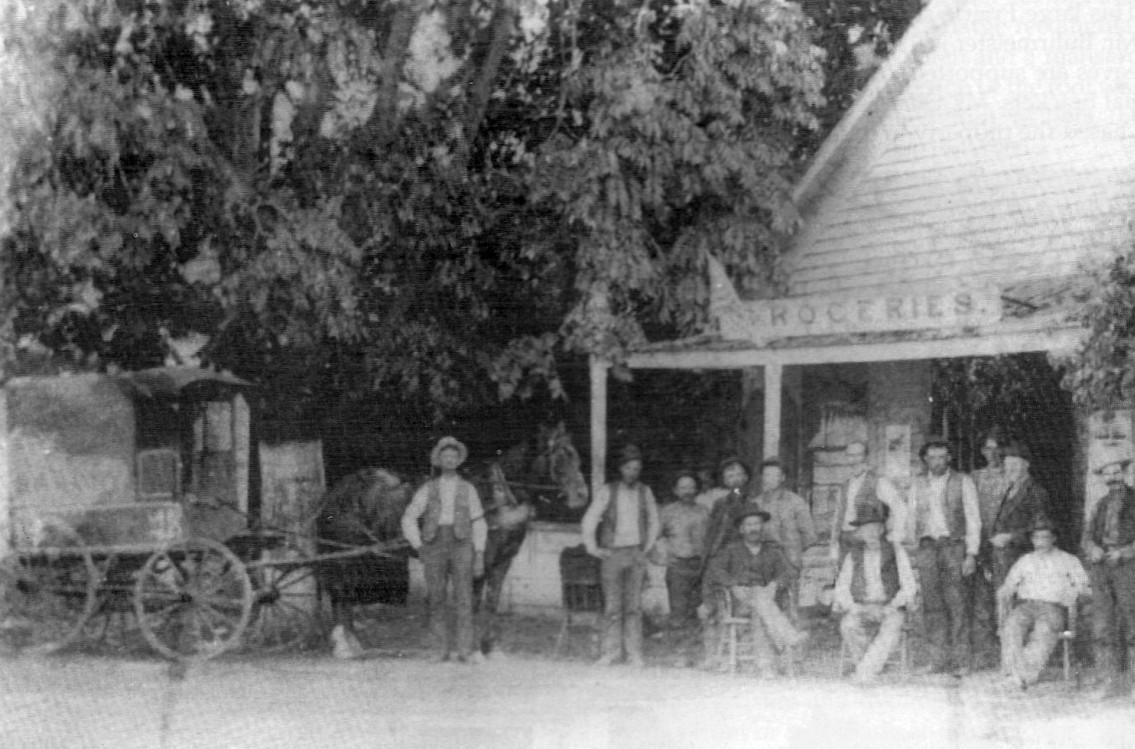
Christley Mankas' store in the late 1800s was located at the same site as Mankas Corner today.

== Description ==
The area around Mankas Corner is primarily agricultural, with the main crops being wine grapes and olives. However, row crops such as wheat, sorghum, sunflowers and soy beans are important also. The area has a semi-coastal Mediterranean climate, and sits at a relatively low elevation of 128 feet (39 m). The terrain is flat, but there are mountains on three sides. Prominent landmarks visible from Mankas Corner are Mt. Diablo, which is visible to the south across the Suisun Bay estuary, the twin summit of Twin Sisters, which is the high point in the Howell Mountains to the west, and the Blue Ridge of the Vaca Mountains, a prominent escarpment visible to the east.

== History ==
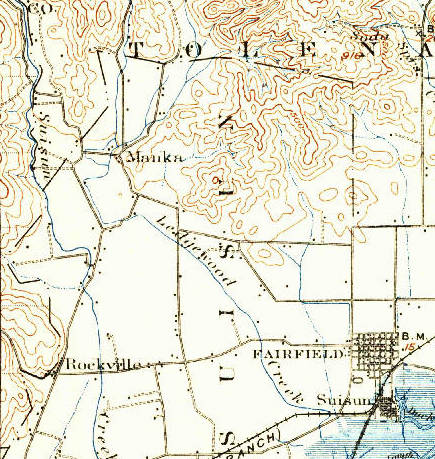
Manka's Corner in 1902

Mankas Corner is named after Christley Manka (1814–1888), who in 1855 bought from John Barton an interest in a store and tavern at that location. It was then the intersection of the Benicia-to-Suisun City stagecoach route and the main road running between Suisun and the Berryessa Valley. Wheat from Berryessa Valley farms supplied grain to much of the state, and each harvest massive wagons drawn by multi-horse teams used the Suisun-Berryessa road to haul this wheat to the Suisun City port. The Suisun-Berryessa road was also part of the main route from San Francisco to the Sulphur Bank quicksilver mine in Knoxville, which meant that Barton and Manka's store sat at a major crossroads. Manka by 1859 had bought out Barton's interest in the store, and over the next forty years his store became a popular community center with an adjacent post office, blacksmith shop and Masonic Hall. Today a restaurant occupies the original site of the old store, with other establishments and a few residences nearby.

== See also ==
- Howell Mountains
- Vaca Mountains
