= Tolenas Springs =

Water source in California

- Solano Mineral Springs; Suisun Soda Springs
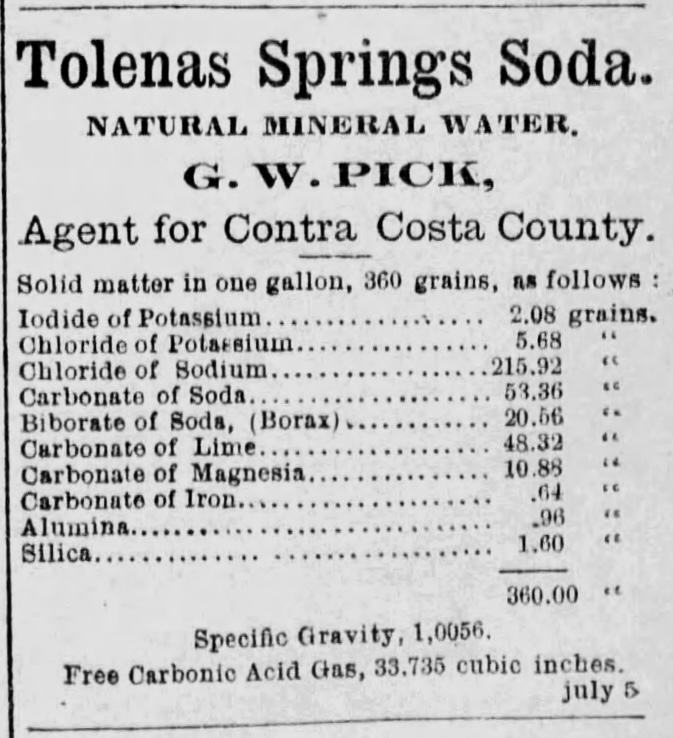
- Martinez News-Gazette, July 26, 1884
- Interactive map of Tolenas Springs
- Location: Near Fairfield, Solano County, California
- Type: carbonated
- Discharge: 600–700 USgal/hour
- Temperature: 70 °F (21 °C)

Tolenas Springs is a group of natural carbonated-water soda springs in the hills of Solano County, California, United States. The springs emerge from a formation of travertine that has been intermittently quarried for building material. The springs are located on private property and are closed to the public.

== History ==
The springs are located near the source of Soda Springs Creek "on the east and south slopes of the Vaca Mountains. Travertine and onyx have been deposited here upon the sandstone and shale of the Knoxville formation; carbonated saline water issues from and near these deposits. The principal orifice is about 1000 feet west of the main body of travertine, at a pit sunk in a small deposit of onyx." The Tolenas springs were used by the Patwin people and their Paleo-Indian predecessors; there are a number of bedrock mortars and rock cupules at the site that serve as evidence of their past presence. An account recorded in 1963 had it that "Indians camped up there in the early days. Because it was high up, they escaped the winter floods. Game was plentiful: bear, deer, antelope, cottontail rabbits, and lots of acorns." During the Mexican era of California history, the springs were part of Rancho Tolenas.

Judge Thomas Swan purchased the springs in 1859 and began marketing the waters. As of 1879, there were four named springs at the site: Empire, White Sulphur, Seltzer, and Congress. As of 1888, there were 19 identified spring vents in the group, and the water was described as "alkaline-saline" and containing carbonic acid gas. An 1890 guide to the mineral waters of California promised, "The view from the springs is quite extensive. On a clear day the State capital, Suisun Bay and valley, Gordon, Wooden, Elmira, etc., may easily be seen. The water is gently aperient and strongly diuretic." As of 1891, a California state geologist reported that the springs were "situated in a terminal ridge of the Coast Range, which descends somewhat precipitously to the Suisun Valley...Some time ago, where the spring now used for supplying the market came out of the ground, an excavation was made to the depth of 10 or 12 feet through several strata of calcareous tufa, which had been deposited by the waters of the spring. These strata were separated by layers of 'adobe' clay; at 10 feet a white sand was passed through which rested upon a level floor of whitish clay, through which a hole two inches in diameter allowed water to escape." The site was partially developed in the 19th century: "There was a bottling works there, and a small resort. Solano County residents would go there for Sunday picnics. Some even took tents and camped near the springs for a few days. The grade up to the springs was steep and travel hampered by sharp protruding rocks."

A marketing pamphlet produced by the Solano County Board of Supervisors around 1904 described the springs as a "rich mineral spring amid rugged, beautiful surroundings" that could someday be developed into a "pleasure resort". It was not to be so. The marketing of Tolenas water continued "until around 1905, then it just faded into history along with the resort." What was left of the buildings reportedly burned in 1924.

The springs are located on private property and are not accessible to the public.

== Water profile ==
In September 1913, a California state geologist noted found that the main Tolenas spring had a temperature of 66 °F (19 °C) while the "spring at aragonite deposit on road below house" had a temperate of 76 °F (24 °C). He also found that "there was much gas escaping from this latter spring, and it was surrounded by a considerable deposit of calcareous sinter. Water from the former is bottled for sale. It has a noticeable salty taste from the sodium chloride it carries—216 grains per gallon. The escaping gas (CO_{2}) is caught in a gasometer and pumped into the water in bottling. There are no accommodations for guests. There is also a white sulphur spring about 1/4 mile below."

Geologist C. F. Berkstresser Jr. visited in 1965 and reported on two Tolenas springs. The first issued "from quarry blasthole. Unused. Sodium chloride. Water discharges in a very thick deposit of travertine, locally stained with iron oxide, that covers about 20 acres. Abundant carbon dioxide discharge with water, making foamy froth." Berkstresser found that the second "spring issues inside partly destroyed rock and mortar curb and discharges through vertical 2-inch pipe stuck into spring area. Unused. Sodium bicarbonate. Moderate amount of gas discharges with water. Small amount of iron-stained travertine in spring pit and channel. Tastes carbonated."

== Marble quarry ==
The marble at Tolenas was "discovered" in 1855. Quarrying of the stone for export, with the work performed by Chinese immigrant laborers, began shortly thereafter. This marble, properly aragonite, was marketed as "Tolenas onyx." This deposit was quarried again in the 1960s, primarily for use as a building material.

== See also ==
- History of Solano County
