= Rancho Suisun =

Mexican land grant in California

Coordinates: 38.270°N 122.040°W

Rancho Suisun was a 18,237-acre (73.80 km^{2}) Mexican land grant in present-day Solano County, California given in 1842 by Governor Juan Alvarado to Francisco Solano Indian chief and Captain in the Mexican Army. The rancho lands include the present-day city of Fairfield, California.

== History ==
Chief Solano received a four square leagues land grant due to his friendship and support of General Mariano Guadalupe Vallejo. However Solano was not able to retain it, and sold it to General Vallejo in May 1850. There was a dispute between Vallejo and José Francisco Armijo of Rancho Tolenas about the boundary between the two ranchos.

In August 1850, General Vallejo sold Rancho Suisun to Capt. Archibald Alexander Ritchie. Three days later, Ritchie sold a one-third interest in the land to Capt. Robert Henry Waterman, who like Ritchie had been involved in the China trade. Waterman, who came from Fairfield, Connecticut, established Fairfield, California in 1856. Rancho Suisun would become an ongoing legal battle for Ritchie until his death in 1856.

With the cession of California to the United States following the Mexican-American War, the 1848 Treaty of Guadalupe Hidalgo provided that the land grants would be honored. As required by the Land Act of 1851, a claim for Rancho Suisun was filed with the Public Land Commission in 1852 and the grant was confirmed by the commission. The United States unsuccessfully appealed the legality of Chief Solano's title to the US Supreme Court and 17,755 acres (71.9 km^{2}) of the grant was patented to Archibald A. Ritchie in 1857.

A claim for Rancho Suisun was filed with the Public Land Commission in 1852, and 482 acres (2.0 km^{2}) of the grant was patented to J. H. Fine in 1882.

== Archibald Alexander Ritchie ==
Archibald Alexander Ritchie (January 28, 1806, New Castle, Delaware - July 9, 1856, Napa, California). Ritchie was a sea captain involved in trading with China. In 1838, Capt. Ritchie left the sea to become the resident agent at Canton, China where he lived until 1847. The discovery of gold in California brought Capt. Ritchie to San Francisco. He was prominent merchant providing supplies for the gold rush. In 1850, Ritchie made Benicia his primary residence until 1854. In 1850 Ritchie purchased Rancho Suisun from General Vallejo. Ritchie and Paul S. Forbes acquired Rancho Guenoc and the adjoining Rancho Collayomi in Lake County in 1851. Ritchie hired John M. Hamilton, his brother-in-law, and Robert Sterling, nephew of Capt. Robert Henry Waterman, as managers. On July 9, 1856, nearing Napa from Sonoma, Ritchie was thrown from his wagon and killed.

== See also ==
- Ranchos of California
- List of Ranchos of California
