= John Cobb (pioneer) =

American pioneer (1814–1893)

- Born: 19 May 1814; Henry County, Kentucky, United States
- Died: 13 November 1893 (aged 79); Lake County, California
- Known for: Cobb Mountain, Cobb, California

John Cobb (19 May 1814 – 13 November 1893) was an American pioneer. He was born in Kentucky, then moved frequently from farm to farm in Midwestern United States before taking his family across the Great Plains and the Rocky Mountains to California in 1850–1851. Here he continued to move frequently before finally settling in what is known as Cobb Valley in Lake County, California, the first European to settle in the region. His name survives in Cobb Mountain and the village of Cobb, California, both in Lake County, California.

== Early Years (1814–1832) ==
Locations in the United States

John Cobb was born on 19 May 1814 in Henry County, Kentucky, across the Ohio River from Madison in Jefferson County, Indiana. His father was a farmer. When he was a child the family lived in Indiana for six years before returning to Kentucky. When Cobb was 16 the family moved to Jefferson County, Indiana. Cobb left home when he was 18 and moved to Vigo County, Indiana in 1832, where he started a keelboat freighter service between towns on the Wabash River. He travelled down the Wabash to the Ohio River, down the Ohio to Paducah at the mouth of the Tennessee River, then up the Tennessee to Florence, Tennessee. Cobb then returned to Grand Rapids on the Wabash River in Knox County, Indiana, where he raised and sold a crop of corn. Afterwards, he went to Lafayette in Tippecanoe County, Indiana, where he bought a team of horses.

== Mid-West (1835–1850) ==
When his father died in 1835 during a trip to Arkansas, the 21 year old Cobb found himself head of the family. He returned to Madison, Indiana where his mother and family were living, and moved them to Tippecanoe County, where he continued to farm and operate a keelboat until spring of 1836. Cobb next moved with his mother, two sisters and brother to Bloomington (now Muscatine) in Iowa Territory on the bank of the upper Mississippi River. He spent three years there farming and trading. Around March 1839 his mother died during a trip to visit her mother in Madison, Indiana. Cobb had taken his mother to Madison, but had gone on to New Orleans when she died.

Cobb returned to Madison in April 1839, then went back to Iowa, where he stayed until the fall. He decided to move to Texas, and reached Arkansas where he fell sick with the "white swelling" (tuberculous arthritis), which left him somewhat crippled for life. He returned to Iowa in the spring of 1841. In 1843 he moved to Quincy, Illinois, where on 18 April 1844 he married Jane Ann Leypold from Ohio. They had two children, both of whom died in their first year. His wife died on 12 January 1848. On 17 August 1848 he married his second wife, Esther K. Deming of Ohio. They would have six children. Their eldest son, John Jr., was born in Illinois in 1849.

== Journey West (1850–1851) ==
In the spring of 1850, the Cobbs and their one child set out across the plains with an ox cart bound for California. They reached Salt Lake City on 17 August 1850, and stayed there several months due to the health of Esther Cobb. While in Salt Lake Cobb became involved with the Mormons. Later he would officiate at a number of weddings in Lake County as an elder of the Latter Day Saints. Their second son, George, was born in 1851 in the Utah Territory. In the spring of 1851 they set out again, crossed the mountains, and on 1 July 1851 reached Ringold, near Placerville, California. (Note: Placerville was a central hub for the Mother Lode region's mining operations during the California Gold Rush (1848–1855).)

== California (1851–1893) ==
Cobb briefly tried mining in Ringold, then bought a grocery store and ran a boarding house. In September 1851 he sold out and moved to the Napa Valley in Napa County, California, where he rented a farm near Calistoga. After farming for one year he sold his crop. In September 1852 the family moved north to Oregon. Their third son Joseph was born in 1852 in Oregon. In August 1853 they returned to Napa County and rented a farm.

In 1853 an Indian treaty was overturned, freeing a large area of land for settlers in what is now Lake County, California. John Cobb was one of the first to take advantage of the opportunity. In October 1853 he travelled north towards Clear Lake, then part of Napa County. and found a place to settle in what is now called Cobb Valley, since he was its first settler. In November 1853 he brought his wife and three young sons to the valley. They planted an orchard and a garden on the east bank of Nutmeg Creek, about 0.5 miles (0.80 km) west of what is now Little Red Schoolhouse. (Note: Cobb is said to have built a small saw and grist mill on Cobb Creek, although this may have been built by other settlers. The mill was opened in 1856 along Kelsey Creek in Cobb Valley, the first in the area.)

In 1854 Cobb was elected County Assessor for Napa County, serving for the year of 1855. His daughter Mary was born in Cobb Valley in 1854, and his fourth son Thomas was probably born there in 1856. Once a year they made the journey by oxcart to Napa, which took five days each way, to sell excess farm produce, butter, cheese and chickens and to buy supplies. In 1857 Cobb was elected road overseer for Clear Lake Township. Cobb sold his interests and moved back south. The records show that Thomas Standiford bought Cobb's Nutmeg Creek properties in 1858. Cobb moved down to the Middletown area in the Callayomi Valley where he farmed. Cobb's last child, Hester, was born on 8 July 1858.

By 1860 the Cobbs had returned to Lake County, probably to a property in Little High Valley opposite today's Six Sigma winery, about 8 miles (13 km) west of Cobb Valley. In 1861, when Lake County was split off from Napa County, Cobb was hired to manage Rancho Guenoc and Rancho Collayomi of Archibald Alexander Ritchie's estate. He moved with his wife and younger children into the Stone House in Coyote Valley, which had been abandoned, and farmed there for about three years. He leased out farms on the ranches to settlers and encouraged them to buy when they could. He moved to nearby Healdsburg in Sonoma County for two years so his children could go to school. He then returned to Little High Valley, and spent about four years improving the 520 acres (210 ha) farm.

The Great Registry of Voters described John Cobb in 1868 as age 52, 5'10½", sandy complexion, blue eyes, gray hair. Cobb returned to Healdsburg for about eighteen months while his younger children completed their education, then returned permanently to Lake County. Back in Little High Valley Cobb established a mill, farm, orchard and large vineyard. He would live there for the remainder of his life. His adult sons obtained titles to various parcels of adjoining land, and eventually the family owned most of the small valley. John Cobb died on 13 November 1893. He is buried in the Pioneer Cemetery in Lower Lake with his wife Esther, son William and daughter Hester.

== Sources ==
- "John Cobb", History of Napa and Lake Counties, California, San Francisco, California: Slocum, Bowen & Co., 1881
- "John Cobb", South Lake County, California, History, South Lake County Historical Society
- Lundquist, Erica (February 2010), Kelsey Creek Watershed Assessment (PDF), Big Valley Watershed Council, archived from the original (PDF) on 2021-04-22
- Mauldin, Henry (1995). Mountains & Pioneers of Lake County. Kelseyville, CA: Earthen Vessels Productions, Inc. ISBN 978-1-887400-22-0.
- "Placerville, California (Old Hangtown)". El Dorado County Visitors Authority. Archived from the original on April 26, 2007.
- Scavone, Kathleen (15 December 2019), "The Living Landscape: Cobb Mountain – crest of beauty", Lake County News
