= Suisun Valley AVA =

American Viticultural Area in California

Coordinates: 38°18′01″N 122°05′35″W

Suisun Valley
- Wine region
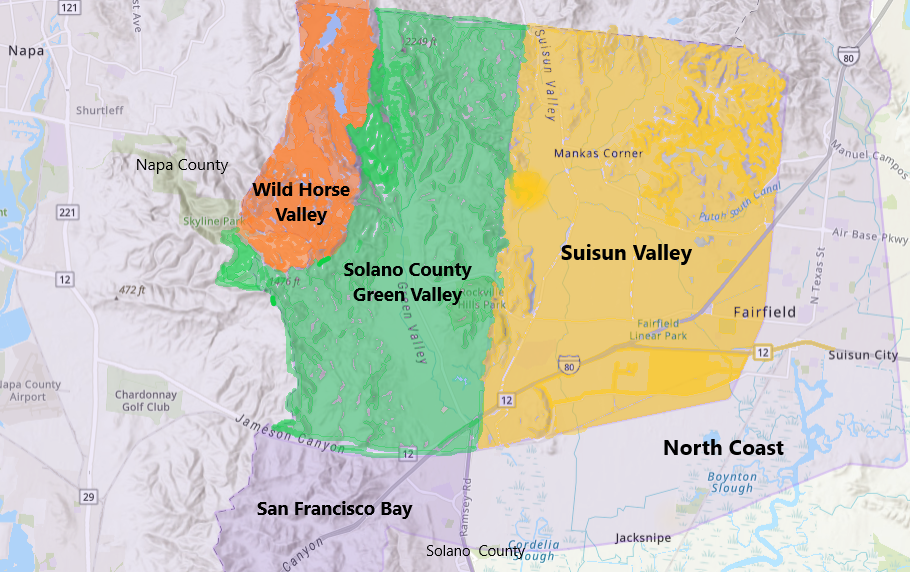
- Type: American Viticultural Area
- Year established: 1982
- Years of wine industry: 166
- Country: United States
- Part of: California, North Coast AVA, Solano County
- Other regions in California, North Coast AVA, Solano County: Solano County Green Valley AVA
- Growing season: 312 days
- Climate region: Region III
- Heat units: 3,368 GDD units
- Precipitation (annual average): 10–20 in (254–508 mm)
- Soil conditions: Brentwood clay loam, Sycamore silty clay loam, San Ysidro sandy loam and Rincon clay loam
- Total area: 15,000 acres (23 sq mi)
- Size of planted vineyards: 3,000 acres (1,214 ha)
- No. of vineyards: 7
- Grapes produced: Cabernet Sauvignon, French Colombard, Chardonnay, Petite Sirah, Pinot Noir, Riesling, Sauvignon Blanc, Valdiguie, Syrah, Zinfandel
- No. of wineries: 16

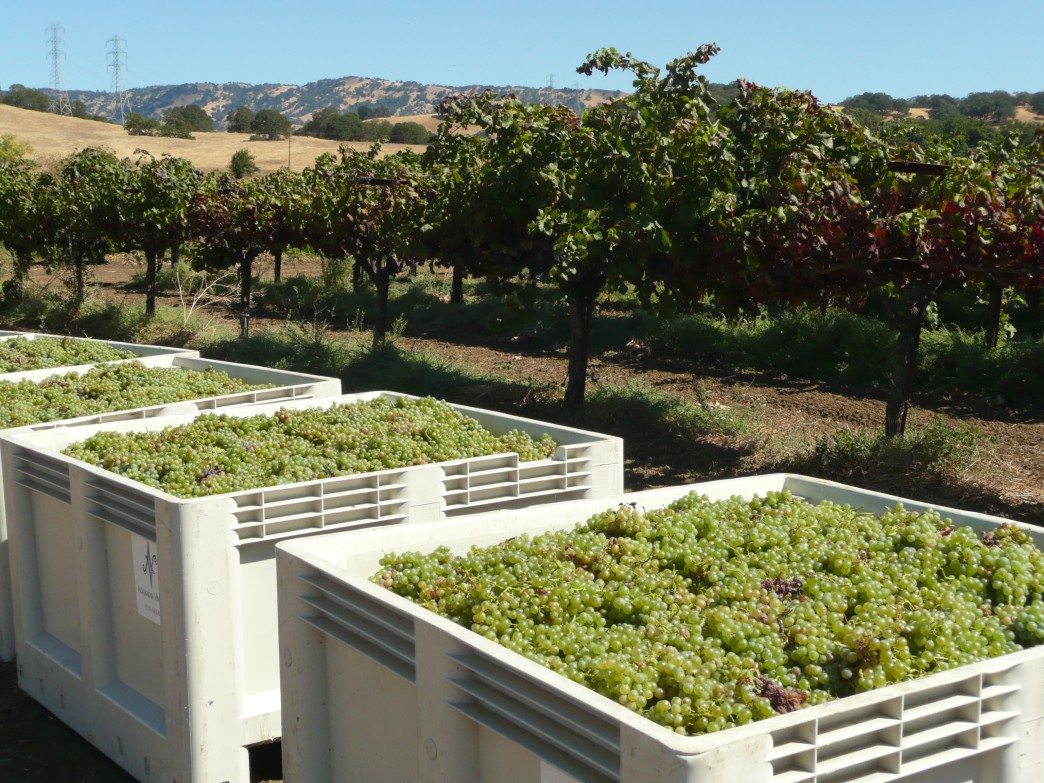
French Colombard grapes from Suisun Valley

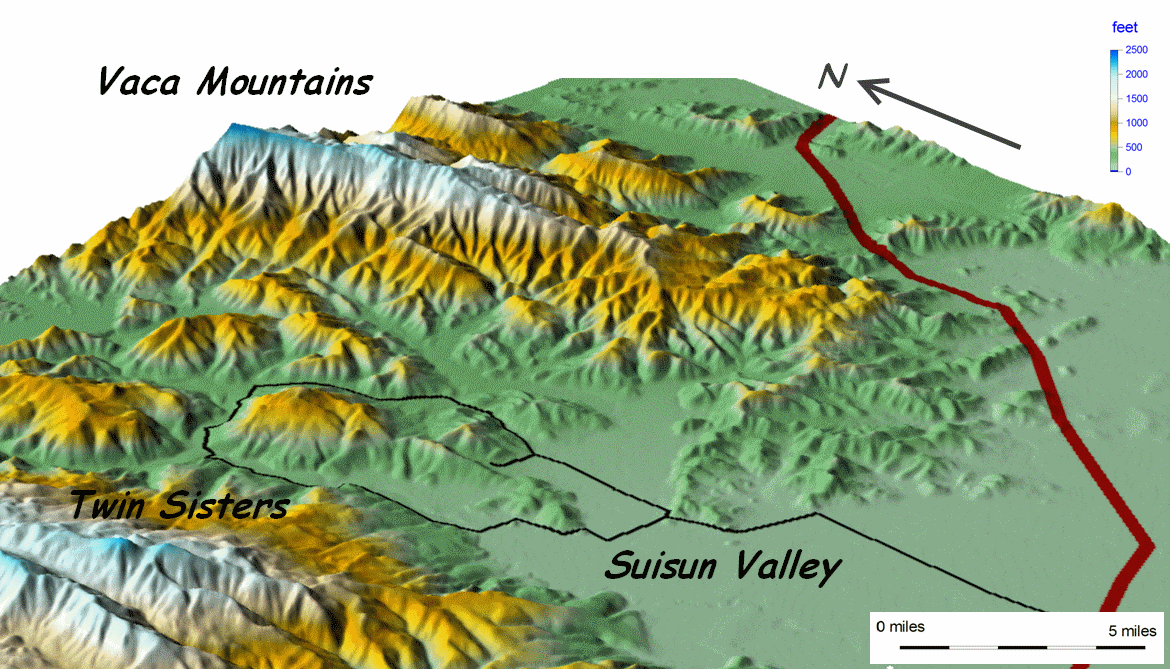
Digital Elevation Model (DEM) for Suisun Valley

Suisun Valley is an American Viticultural Area (AVA) located in western Solano County, California, located east of the Napa Valley in the Coast Range and directly west of the city and county seat of Fairfield. The wine appellation was established as the nation's 21^{st}, the state's fourteenth and the county's initial AVA on November 24, 1982 by the Bureau of Alcohol, Tobacco and Firearms (ATF), Treasury after reviewing the petition submitted by Mr. Ben A. Volkhardt, president of the West Solano County Grape Growers Association, proposing a viticultural area in Solano County, known as "Suisun Valley."

The Suisun Valley landform is approximately three miles (5 km) wide and eight miles (13 km) long encompassing about 15,000 acres (23 sq mi) with approximately 3,000 acres (1,214 ha) cultivating more than twenty varieties of wine grapes including Barbera, Cabernet Sauvignon, Chardonnay, French Colombard, Napa Gamay (Valdiguie), Grenache, Merlot, Mouvedre, Muscat Canelli, Petite Sirah, Petite Verdot, Pinot Gris, Pinot Noir, Primitivo, Rousanne, Sauvignon Blanc, Sangiovese, Shiraz, Syrah, Viognier, Riesling, and Zinfandel.

== History ==
Suisun Valley (/suːˈsuːn/ soo-SOON) is named after the local indigenous people, a distinct tribe known as the Suisuns, who spoke a dialect of the Patwin language. Francisco Solano, a Suisun chief and protégé of Mexican General Mariano Vallejo, applied in 1837 to the Mexican government for a land grant covering his ancestral homeland. However, Solano died before the process was complete and Vallejo took over the application. About the same time, the Tolenas and Rio de los Putos land grants in the northern and eastern highlands of the valley were awarded to the Armijo and Wolfskill families. The California Gold Rush of 1849 brought a tremendous influx of settlers that led to land disputes and resulted in partitioning of these original grants into smaller parcels.

Early land holders in the valley grazed cattle, but wheat, because of its drought resistance, became an important crop in the latter part of the 19th century. Orchards of dominantly pears and apricots began to replace wheat around the turn of the century and soon became the dominant crop.
Grapes have been grown commercially in Solona County since the late 1800's. The first commercial winery in the valley was C. Schultz & Company, started in 1860 by the Schultz brothers Carsten and Henry, who moved from Hamburg in 1856. After operating for twenty or so years, they sold their operation in 1880 to Suisun winemaker Louis Mangels, who at the time ran one of the largest wineries in the state. As early as 1909, over 2,000 acres (809 ha) were recorded by the Bureau of the Census. Since that time, a small but stable wine grape acreage has been continuously maintained. Several family operations continued into the 1920s, but these disappeared, by and large, during Prohibition. Winemaking started up again on a small scale following World War II, and the industry steadily grew ever since. Although wine grapes now constitute the main crop of the valley, fruit orchards are still important, as well as wheat, and various row crops such as soy beans, sorghum, corn, and sunflowers. The growing of olives for olive oil has recently become an important crop and several vineyards grow both grapes and olives. At the outset, about 800 acres (324 ha) of grapes were under cultivation within the proposed area with two wineries in operation.

== Terroir ==
=== Topography ===
Suisun Valley is a region in the California Coast Ranges that is bordered on the east side by the Blue Ridge of the Vaca Mountains, and on the west side by the Howell Mountains, which are also called the St. George Range. The valley is located almost entirely in Solano County with a northern terminus near the Napa County borderline, and a southern terminus at Suisun Bay in the estuary where the Sacramento River enters San Francisco Bay. Elevations on the valley floor range from 100 to 200 feet (30 to 61 m) above sea level, rising steeply to 1,122 feet (342 m) at Okell Hill on the north side, and to 2,162 feet (659 m) on the west side at Twin Sisters, a twin summit that is the high point of the Howell Mountains, as well as a prominent landmark in the valley. Blue Ridge on the east side of the valley exceeds 2,000 feet (610 m) elevation for much of its length. The watershed in Suisun Valley drains southward into the Suisun Bay. In the Vacaville-Dixon area, which lies to the east of Suisun Valley, the watershed drains eastward in to the Sacramento River.

=== Climate ===
Suisun Valley has a semi-coastal Mediterranean climate with a cool wet season from November to April, followed by a warm dry season. Moist winds blow inland from San Pablo Bay and Suisun Bay at the headwaters of San Francisco Bay almost continuously from May through October, which minimizes frost danger. Mean rainfall averages about 20 inches (508 mm) a year in the southeast part of the valley to 30 inches (762 mm) in the northwest, with nearly all rain falling during the wet season. Fog hardly ever penetrates into the Suisun Valley due to its distance from the Pacific Ocean. In contrast, fog is very prevalent in Green Valley due to its proximity to the ocean.

The climate is classified as mid-Region III under the University of California, Davis system of heat summation by degree-days (GDD), averaging about 3,350 degree days per year, with the mid-valley averaging 3,250 to 3,450 degree days per year, and the upper valley averaging 3,700 to 3,750 degree days. The USDA plant hardiness zones are 9a and 9b.

=== Geology ===
Sedimentary rock composed of sandstone and shale of the Great Valley Sequence that is Early Cretaceous in age makes up the bedrock that is buried beneath the fill of the valley floor. Similar sedimentary rocks crop out in the hills that border the east and north sides of the valley. By contrast, rocks of the Pliocene-age Sonoma Volcanics, which are mainly pyroclastic breccias and tuffs, with some interbedded volcanic flows, make up the Howell Mountains that border the west side of the valley. Suisun and Green Valley Creeks drain the northern uplands and create an alluvial fan that covers most of the valley floor, and builds out to the south into the Suisun Marsh.

=== Soils ===
Suisun Valley soils developed on the alluvial fan, where most of the vineyards are located, range from a very thick layer of Sycamore silty loam that covers most of the fan on the valley floor, San Ysidro sandy loam and thinner Rincon and Brentwood clay loams that develop where the fan laps onto the valley margins, and drainage is somewhat better. Dibble and Los Osos soils that cover sedimentary bedrock in the eastern and northern foothills, and Hambright and Toomes soils that cover volcanic bedrock on the west side generally are more conducive to grazing cattle than growing grapes.

=== Irrigation ===
The primary source of water for the valley is the Putah South Canal, which was completed November 7, 1957 in conjunction with the controversial Monticello Dam and Lake Berryessa reservoir. The canal, which is operated by the Solano Irrigation District, began water deliveries on May 15, 1959 and currently provides irrigation water from the reservoir to most farms, vineyards and orchards in the valley.

== Viticulture ==
The Western Solano County Grape Growers Association successfully petitioned the ATF in 1982 for AVA recognition and the Suisun Valley Grape Growers Association formed in 2003 to promote the local industry. The Valley association, now known as the Suisun Valley Vintners and Growers Association, currently lists sixteen Suisun Valley wineries in the AVA. Both the Suisun Valley AVA and the Napa Valley AVA are part of the North Coast AVA, a regional appellation that includes the grape-growing districts of six counties located north of San Francisco Bay. This allows for wines made by blending grapes from different appellations within the six county region to be identified as North Coast wines.

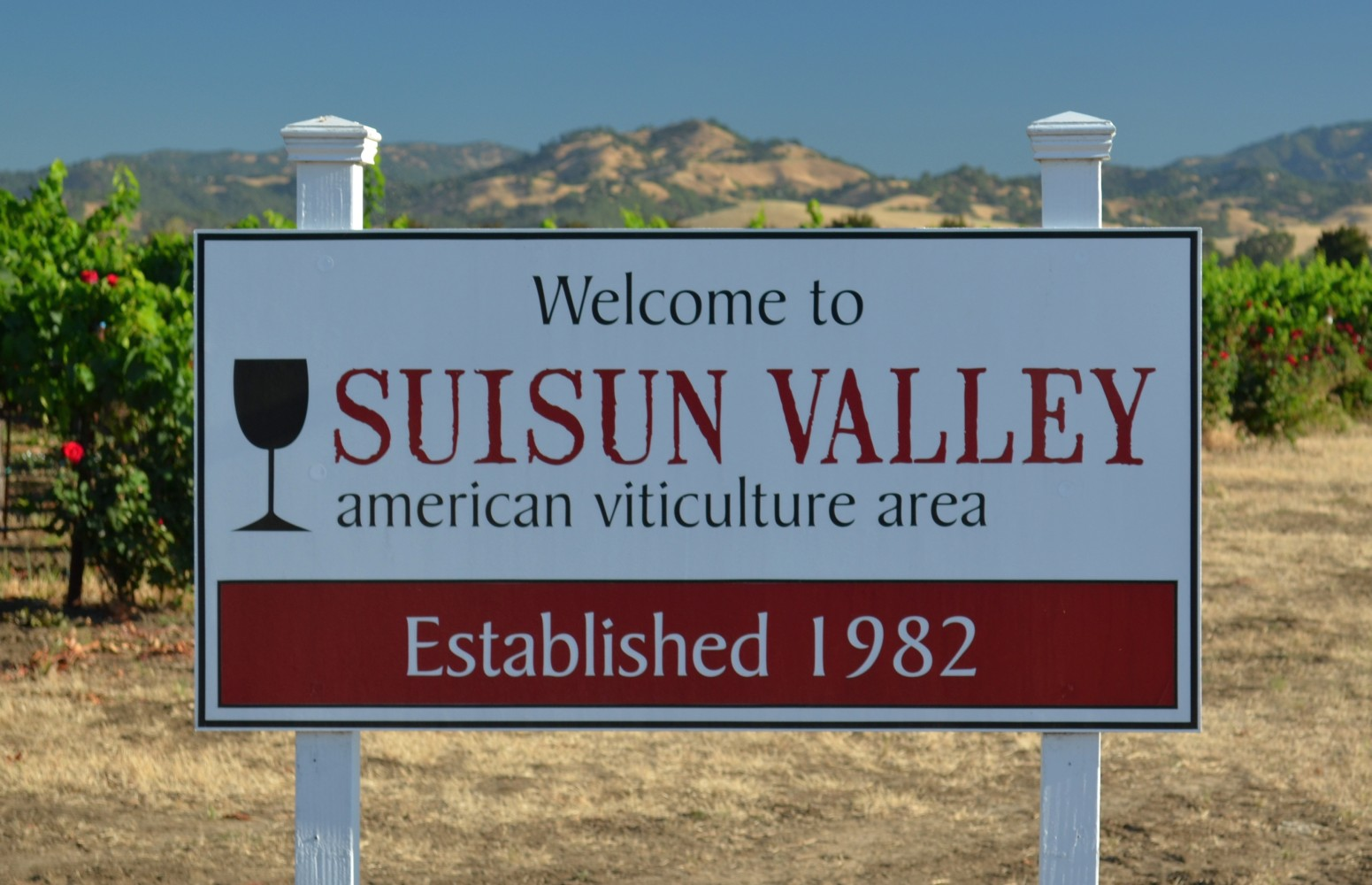

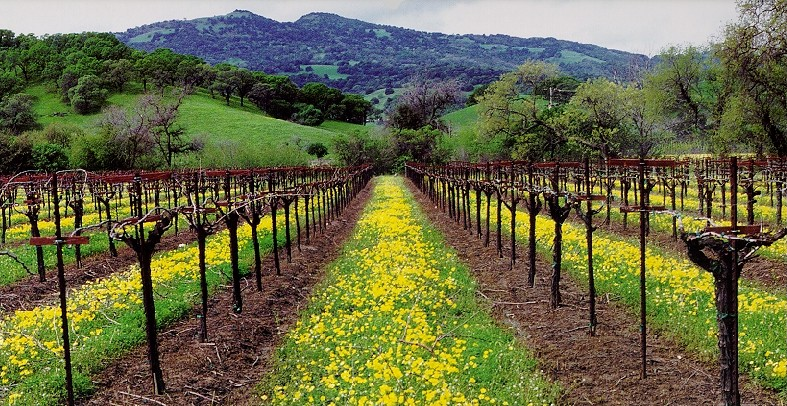
Suisun Valley vineyard below the Twin Sisters summit

== See also ==
- California wine
- Howell Mountains
- Mankas Corner
- Twin Sisters
- Vaca Mountains
