= Green Valley, California =

Green Valley, California may refer to:

- Green Valley, former name of Greenwood, El Dorado County, California
- Green Valley, El Dorado County, California, former settlement
- Green Valley, Los Angeles County, California, census-designated place
- Green Valley, Solano County, California, census-designated place
  - Solano County Green Valley AVA
- Green Valley Lake, California
