= Stone House (Lake County, California) =

- Location within California
- 38°48′29.7″N 122°34′11.6″W
- Location: Hidden Valley Lake, Lake County, California

History
- Built: 1853-54

California Historical Landmark
- Reference no.: 450

The Stone House is the oldest building in Lake County, Northern California. The building is registered as California Historical Landmark #450 and is located in Hidden Valley Lake, California. It is open for touring quarterly and by appointment with the Stone House Historical Society.

== History ==
The Stone House was built of local stone in 1853–54 by Robert Sterling. His wife was the first non-Indian woman to enter the Coyote Valley.

In 1861, when Lake County was split off from Napa County, John Cobb was hired to manage the Rancho Guenoc and Rancho Collayomi of the Ritchie estate. He moved with his wife and younger children into the Stone House, which had been abandoned, and farmed there for about three years.

It was rebuilt in 1894 and served as headquarters of the Rancho Guenoc, a former Mexican land grant rancho, and it was also the first store in Coyote Valley.

== See also ==
- Ranchos of Lake County, California
- National Register of Historic Places listings in Lake County, California
- List of Museums in the North Coast (California)
