= Patwino Worrtla Kodoi Dihi Open Space Park =

Park in California, United States

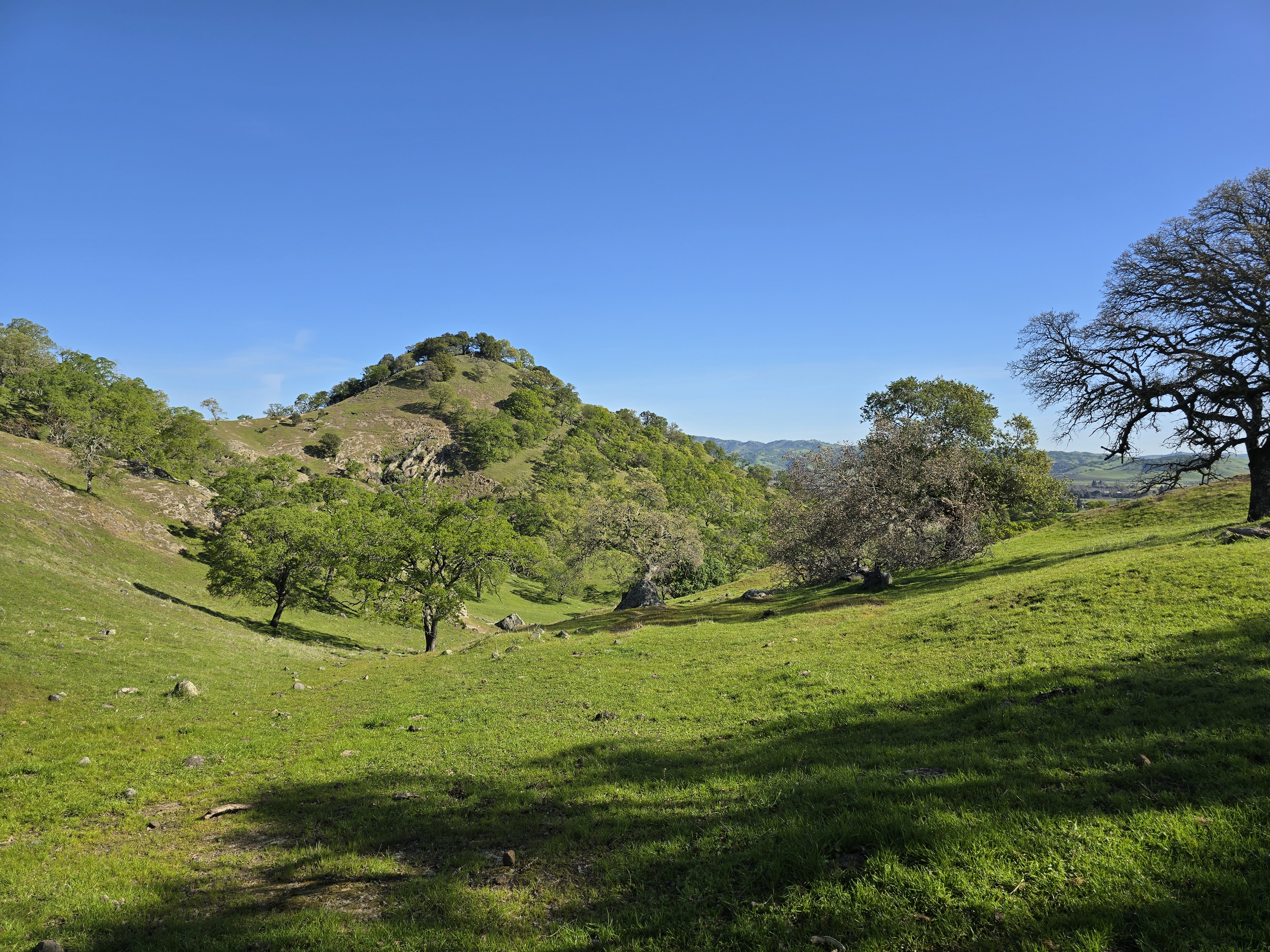
- A view of Suisun Valley, blue oaks and igneous rocks twisted by faulting

- Location within California Location within the United States
- Location: Solano County, California
- Nearest city: Fairfield
- Coordinates: 38.253°N 122.138°W
- Area: 1,500-acre (6.1 km^{2})

Patwino Worrtla Kodoi Dihi Open Space Park is a 1500-acre (~600 hectare, ~6 square kilometer) regional park in the city of Fairfield, Solano County, California, United States. The name means "Southern Rock Home of the Patwin People" in the Patwin language. The park is administered by the Solano Land Trust in partnership with the Yocha Dehe Wintun Nation. Opened in 2024, the park features 14 miles of trails, and includes ADA-compliant trails and bathrooms.

== History ==
The land making up the park was set for various development projects since the 1970s, and by the mid-2000s was set to become a 350-home housing development, but local opposition and 15 years of planning led to the purchase and conservation of the park. The name arose in honor of the local Patwin people, whose ancestors lived at the site and made use of the plentiful acorns as an important food source. Funding and support came from the nonprofit Solano Land Trust, the Yocha Dehe nation, and Solano County.

== Trails and amenities ==
The Doris Klein Ridge Trail is a segment of the Bay Area Ridge Trail which passes through the park. The trail is named in honor of Doris Klein, who was a major proponent and planner of the trail.

== Wildlife and Geology ==
The park hosts extensive populations of wildflowers from January to June including sky lupine, California poppy, blue dicks, and others. Elderberry, soap plant and Western redbud are also present, and have many uses for native people. Blue oaks are also numerous, as their shallow, spread-out root systems are well-adapted to the thin soils. The park is grazed by cattle, in order to control invasive grasses and for wildfire suppression.

Extensive outcrops of Sonoma Volcanics formation rocks are present, including andesite, rhyolite, basalt and tuff. An exposed section of the Cordelia Fault runs through the park.
