= Solano County Green Valley AVA =

American Viticultural Area in Solano County, California

Coordinates: 38°16′16″N 122°09′44″W

Solano County Green Valley
- Wine region
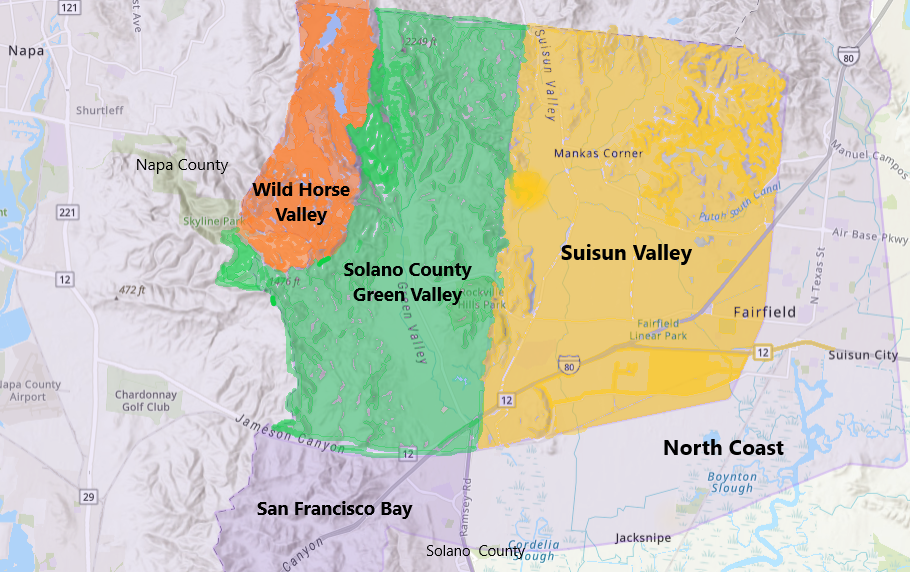
- Type: American Viticultural Area
- Year established: 1982
- Country: United States
- Part of: California, North Coast AVA, Solano County
- Other regions in California, North Coast AVA, Solano County: Suisun Valley AVA
- Growing season: 312 days
- Climate region: Region III-IV
- Heat units: 3,498.2-3,683.9 GDD units
- Precipitation (annual average): less than 2.8 in (71 mm)
- Soil conditions: Conejo clay loam
- Total area: 10,626 acres (17 sq mi)
- Size of planted vineyards: 800 acres (324 ha)
- No. of vineyards: 4
- Grapes produced: Cabernet Sauvignon, Merlot, Sangiovese, Syrah, Zinfandel
- No. of wineries: 2

Solano County Green Valley is an American Viticultural Area (AVA) located in a valley landform in Solano County, California, due east of the Napa Valley wine region in the Coast Range and 12 miles (19 km) northeast of San Pablo Bay. The wine appellation was established as the nation's twenty-first, the state's fourteenth and the county's initial AVA on November 24, 1982 by the Bureau of Alcohol, Tobacco and Firearms (ATF), Treasury after reviewing the petition submitted by Mr. Ben A. Volkhardt, president of the West Solano County Grape Growers Association, proposing a viticultural area in Solano County, known as "Green Valley."

The name of the area, Green Valley, was well documented by the petitioner, as it describes the landform and the census-designated place Green Valley. After evaluating the petition and the comments received, ATF believed that the name "Solano County" should be made a part of the viticultural area name in order to distinguish this area from Green Valley in Sonoma County. ATF believed that the name "Green Valley," qualified by the words "Solano County," is the most appropriate name for the appellation and the additional detail will eliminate any possible consumer confusion concerning where the "Green Valley" AVA is designated. The petition and attached documents show that Green Valley is located in the southwestern portion of Solano County adjacent to the Napa County line and west of Suisun Valley. Green Valley is a small valley approximately one mile (2 km) wide and four miles (6 km) long and, at the outset, had about 400 acres (162 ha) of grapes within its boundaries with a winery scheduled to begin operations in the near future. It lies within the southern end of two ranges of the Coast Range, the Vaca Mountains on the east and the Mount George Range on the west. The valley's southern terminus is the marshlands of Suisun Bay. The plant hardiness zone ranges from 9a to 10a.

== History ==
Historically the grape industry has been centered in Green Valley and Suisun Valley in the south-western portion of the county, adjacent to the Napa County line, and closely linked with the Napa-Sonoma wine industry. These two valleys lie within the southern end of two ranges of the Coast Range, the Vaca Mountains on the east and the Mount George Range on the west. The valleys terminate in the south at the marshlands of Suisun Bay and constitute the drainage basins of Green Valley, Suisun Valley and Ledgewood creeks. Grapes have been grown commercially in the in Solona County since the late 1800's. As early as 1909, over 2,000 acres (809 ha) were recorded by the Bureau of the Census. Since that time, a small but stable wine grape acreage has been continuously maintained.In the 1960's new plantings were established in Lagoon Valley, just east of the Vaca Mountains, and in the 1970's on Ryer and Hastings Islands in the Delta area of eastern Solano County. At the outset, about 400 acres (162 ha) of grapes were under cultivation within the area.

== Terroir ==
=== Topography ===
After reviewing the petition. ATF determined that due to the topographic and climatic features of Green Valley, it is distinguishable from the surrounding areas. Green Valley is a small valley situated within the southern end of two ranges of the Coast Range, the Vaca Mountains on the east and the Mount George Range on the west. The watershed in Green Valley flows southward into the Suisun Bay. In the Vacaville-Dixon area, the watershed drains eastward into the Sacramento River.

=== Climate ===
Green Valley lies within the Coastal area climate and is characterized by cool, moist winds blowing inland from the ocean and bay almost continuously from May through early Fall. The climate in Green Valley is mid-Region III as classified by the University of California at Davis system of heat summation by degree-days (GDD). The season totals for degree-days above 50 degrees Fahrenheit for Green Valley were 3,683.9 in 1973 and 3,498.2 in 1974. In comparison, the season totals for upper Suisun Valley were 3,768.4 in 1973 and 3,700.5 in 1974. In mid-Suisun Valley the season totals were 3,460.4 in 1973 and 3,256.3 in 1974. Suisun Valley lies directly east of Green Valley. Due to the proximity of Green Valley to the Pacific Ocean, fog is very prevalent in the valley during the months of May, June, July and August. In contrast, fog hardly ever penetrates into the nearby Suisun Valley or into the Vacaville-Dixon area which lies to the east of Suisun Valley.

=== Soils ===
The soil in Green Valley consists of Conejo clay loam. In contrast the soil in Suisun Valley consists of Brentwood clay loam, Sycamore silty clay loam, San Ysidro sandy loam, and Rincon clay loam. The soil in the Vacaville-Dixon area consists of Yolo loam, Yolo silty clay loam, and Brentwood clay loam. The watershed in Green Valley drains southward into the Suisun Bay. In the Vacaville-Dixon area, which lies to the east of Green Valley and Suisun Valley, the watershed drains eastward into the Sacramento River. After evaluating the petition and the comments received, ATF has determined that due to the topographic and climatic features of Green Valley, it is distinguishable from the surrounding areas.

== Viticulture ==
The principal varieties of grapes grown in Solano County in decreasing order of acreage are: Gamay, Petite Sirah, Cabernet Sauvignon, Carignane, Zinfandel, French Columbard, Chenin Blanc, Early Burgundy, Gamay Beaujolais, and Gray Riesling. The petition claims that grapes from western Solano County have been well received by Napa-Solano vintners, and growers have experienced no difficulty in meeting the minimum acid and sugar requirements for north-coast grapes.
