= Guenoc =

Guenoc may refer to:

- Guenoc, California
- Guenoc Valley AVA
