= Rancho Sausal =

Mexican land grant in California

Coordinates: 36.700°N 121.620°W

Rancho Sausal was a 10,242-acre (41.45 km^{2}) Mexican land grant in the Salinas Valley, in present-day Monterey County, California, given in 1834 by Governor José Figueroa to José Tibúrcio Castro. An additional grant was made by Governor Pío Pico in 1845. The name is Spanish for "willow grove". The grant encompassed present-day Salinas.

== History ==
José Tibúrcio Castro was living on Rancho Sausal before the 1834 grant of two square leagues. His father, Jose Macario, was a sergeant in the Spanish army. Jose Tiburcio Castro (1780–1840) was also a soldier, and later civil administrator of secularized Mission San Juan Bautista. Jose Tiburcio Castro married Maria Rufina Alvarez and they had two children: José Antonio Castro and Maria Francisca Castro.

Castro sold the land to Jacob P. Leese, who had married General Vallejo’s sister, and acquired extensive land holdings, in 1852.

With the cession of California to the United States following the Mexican–American War, the 1848 Treaty of Guadalupe Hidalgo provided that the land grants would be honored. As required by the Land Act of 1851, a claim for Rancho Sausal was filed with the Public Land Commission in 1853, and the grant was patented to Jacob P. Leese in 1859.

Leese is considered to be one of the founders of Salinas, although he left the area in 1865 and did not return until 1885. Leese sold 80 acres (0.3 km^{2}) to Elias Howe, who is usually credited as the founder of Salinas, in 1856.

In 1860, Leese sold the rancho to Eugene Sherwood.

== See also ==
- Ranchos of California
- List of Ranchos of California
