= Twin Sisters (California) =

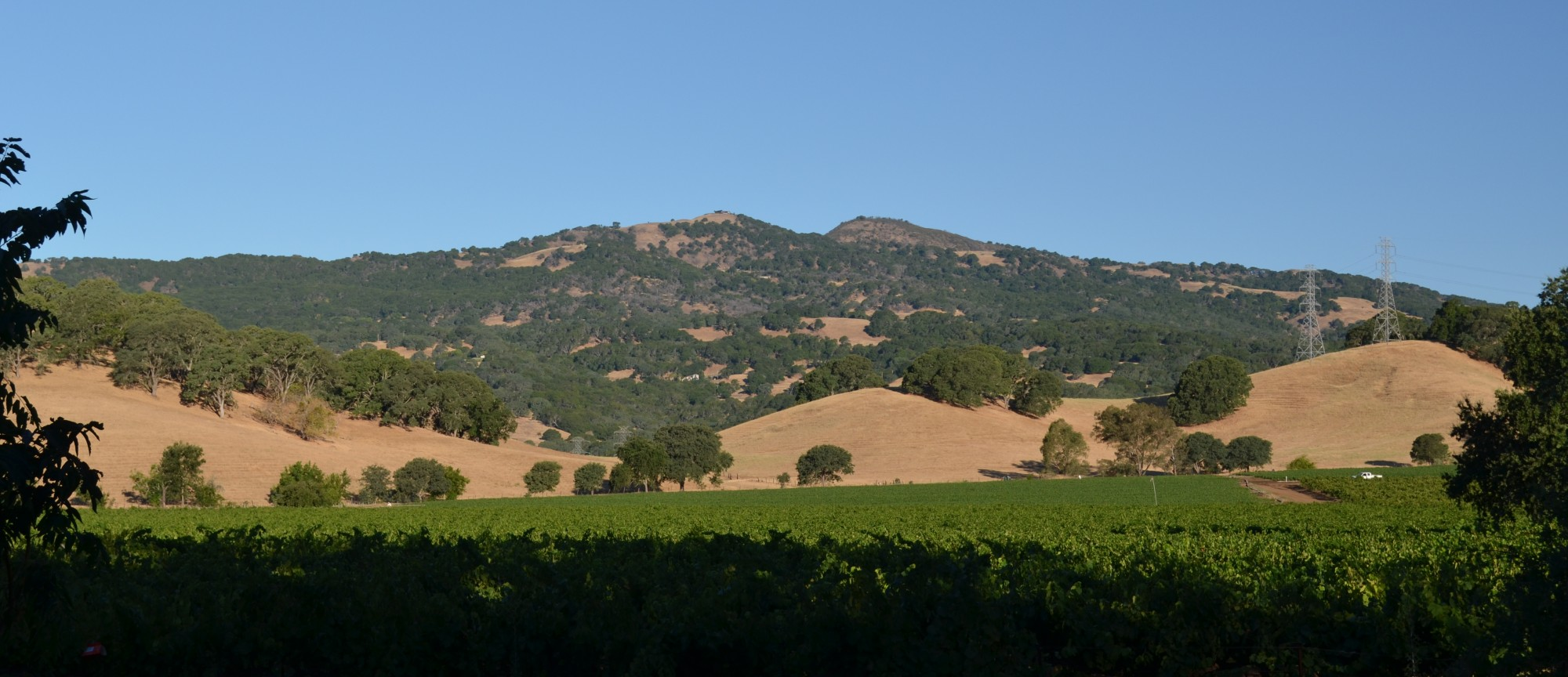
- Twin Sisters as seen from Suisun Valley

Highest point
- Elevation: 2,259 ft (689 m) NGVD 29
- Coordinates: 38.3065802°N 122.1710817°W

Geography
- Location within California
- Location: Napa / Solano counties, California, U.S.
- Topo map: USGS Mount George

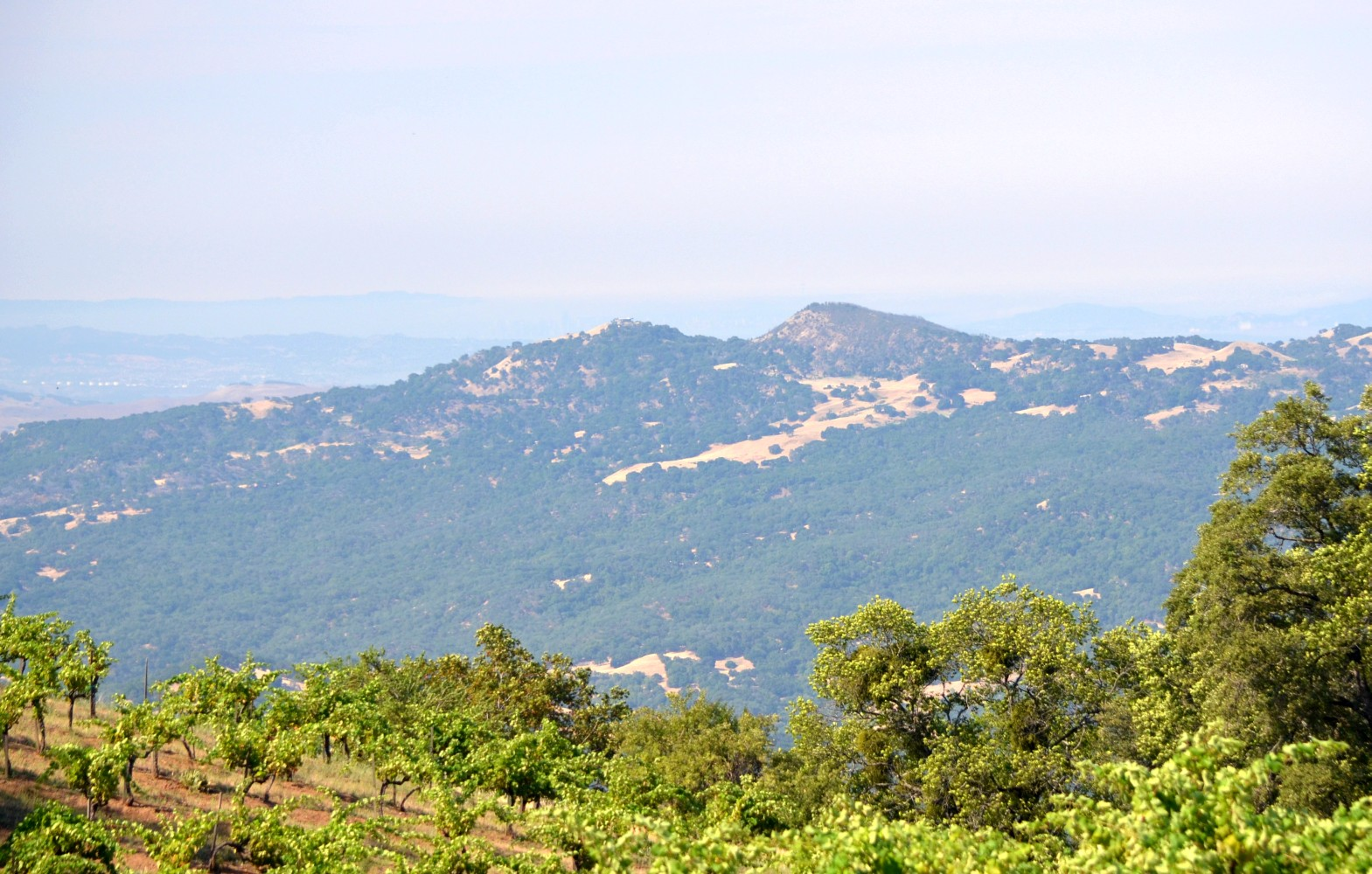
Twin Sisters seen from the top of Mount Vaca.

Twin Sisters are the twin summits of the highest peak in the Howell Mountains of Solano and Napa Counties, California.

== Description ==
The peak straddles a ridge separating the Suisun Valley wine region in Solano County on the east side from the Napa Valley wine region on the west side, and is a prominent landmark visible from most points in Suisun Valley. The north summit at an elevation of 2,259 feet (689 m) is the tallest of the two, and the lower south summit rises to an elevation of 2,177 feet (664 m). It is the second highest peak in Solano County, Mount Vaca being the highest.

== Origin of name ==
The origin of the name Twin sisters is unknown. However, the name was evidently well established when Munro-Fraser (1879) wrote his History of Solano County.

== B18A bomber crash site ==
The lower (south) summit of Twin Sisters is the site of a pre World War II crash on 24 October 1941 of an Army Air Corps B-18A Bolo bomber that killed all five crew members during a relatively short flight from Hamilton Field military air base to nearby McClellan Field. The south summit is also the highest privately owned peak in the San Francisco Bay Area, which led in 2003 to the building of a controversial house, the "house above the morning clouds", very close to the summit crash site by Cigarettes Cheaper! entrepreneur John Roscoe. This led to subsequent calls for county ordinances to prevent future ridge-top building. Roscoe reportedly spent $34 million buying the property and building the house, then put it up for sale in 2005 for $19 million. Following his felony conviction for fraud in 2011, the house was listed for $4.9 million, and it finally sold in 2012 for $3.4 million. This house burned to the ground on Tuesday, 10 Oct 2017 when the Atlas Fire burned over 51,000 acres in the northern California wine country over several days in early October 2017. What little wreckage of the B-18A bomber remains is located only 100 feet (30 m) from the driveway leading to the charred ruins of this house.

== See also ==
- Howell Mountains
- Suisun Valley
