= Rancho Huichica =

Mexican land grant in California

Coordinates: 38.270°N 122.400°W

Rancho Huichica was a 18,704-acre (75.69 km^{2}) Mexican land grant in what became Napa County, California given in 1841 to Jacob P. Leese. Carneros Creek forms the northeast boundary of Rancho Huichica, and the grant contains the majority of the Carneros region in Napa Valley.

== History ==
Leese built the first permanent house in San Francisco. He married General Vallejo’s sister, and moved to Sonoma in 1841. In 1841 Manuel Jimeno, acting Governor of California, granted two square leagues to Leese, and in 1844 Governor Manuel Micheltorena granted Leese a three and a half leagues extension.

With the cession of California to the United States following the Mexican-American War, the 1848 Treaty of Guadalupe Hidalgo provided that the land grants would be honored. As required by the Land Act of 1851, a claim for Rancho Huichica was filed with the Public Land Commission in 1852, and the grant was patented to Jacob P. Leese in 1859.

== See also ==
- Ranchos of California
- List of Ranchos of California
