= Rancho Tolenas =

California Mexican land grant

Coordinates: 38.320°N 122.050°W

Rancho Tolenas was a 13,316-acre (5,389-hectare) Mexican land grant in present-day Solano County and Napa County, California given in 1840 by Governor Juan Bautista Alvarado to José Francisco Armijo. The grant was north east of present-day Fairfield and was bounded on the south by Rancho Suisun.

== History ==
=== Mexican era ===
Jose Francisco Armijo (?–1849), worked with General Vallejo. In 1840 Governor Alvarado granted Armijo the three square league Rancho Tolenas. Armijo returned to New Mexico to gather relatives, workers and provisions, and began the trip back to California in May 1841. In 1842, Armijo brought his four sons, wife, Jesus Maria Armijo, and daughter and 100 head of cattle from New Mexico and built an adobe house, to replace the earlier structure he had erected, and began running cattle in the surrounding hills. A dispute, arose with General Vallejo, who was now the owner of the adjoining Rancho Suisun, over the poorly defined boundary between their respective ranchos. As was typical for Mexican land grants, each of these grants was for a given number of square leagues—four square leagues for Ranch Suisun four, and three square leagues for Ranch Tolenas—within described areas of larger dimensions than the number of square leagues designated. Both grants in their general descriptions, embraced the particular area under dispute.

Vallejo in 1847 instituted an action of trespass against Armijo. Armijo appealed the arbitrator's ruling, and the land dispute went to a jury trial. Jose Francisco Armijo, died unexpectedly in November 1849, leaving his eldest son, Antonio Mariano Armijo, to carry on the appeal. Antonio presented documents of his father's to the jury. Despite questions as to the validity of these papers, the jury delivered a verdict that favored the Armijos. But, as before, the decision did little to resolve the dispute. For a time, bitter warfare, with frequent acts of violence and bloodshed, was waged by both sides, in and out of court. Five months after Jose Armijo died, his son Antonio Armijo also died in April 1850, leaving a widow and seven children.

=== Post-statehood ===
Following the Mexican–American War, both Armijo and Vallejo began selling some of the land. In August 1850, Armijo sold some of the contested land to Daniel Berry. Then, in December 1850 Vallejo sold the entire Suisun grant to Capt. Archibald Alexander Ritchie. Ritchie then sold a one-third interest in his acquisition to Capt. Robert Henry Waterman—included in this sale was property claimed by the Armijos. In 1851, Sampson Smith (–1897) bought from Daniel Berry the parcel sold by Armijo.

With the cession of California to the United States following the Mexican–American War, the 1848 Treaty of Guadalupe Hidalgo provided that the land grants would be honored. As required by the Land Act of 1851, a claim for Rancho Tolenas was filed with the Public Land Commission in 1852. In 1857, Rancho Suisun had then been confirmed, surveyed and patented to Archibald A. Ritchie; and his patent covered the land in dispute. Rancho Tolenas had been confirmed, but not surveyed nor patented. The dispute was finally decided upon appeal to the Supreme Court of California in the important 1859 Waterman v. Smith decision. The Rancho Tolenas grant was patented to Dolores Riesgo Armijo in 1868.

== See also ==
- Cement, California
- List of ranchos of California
- Ranchos of California
- Tolenas Springs
