= Lake Hennessey =

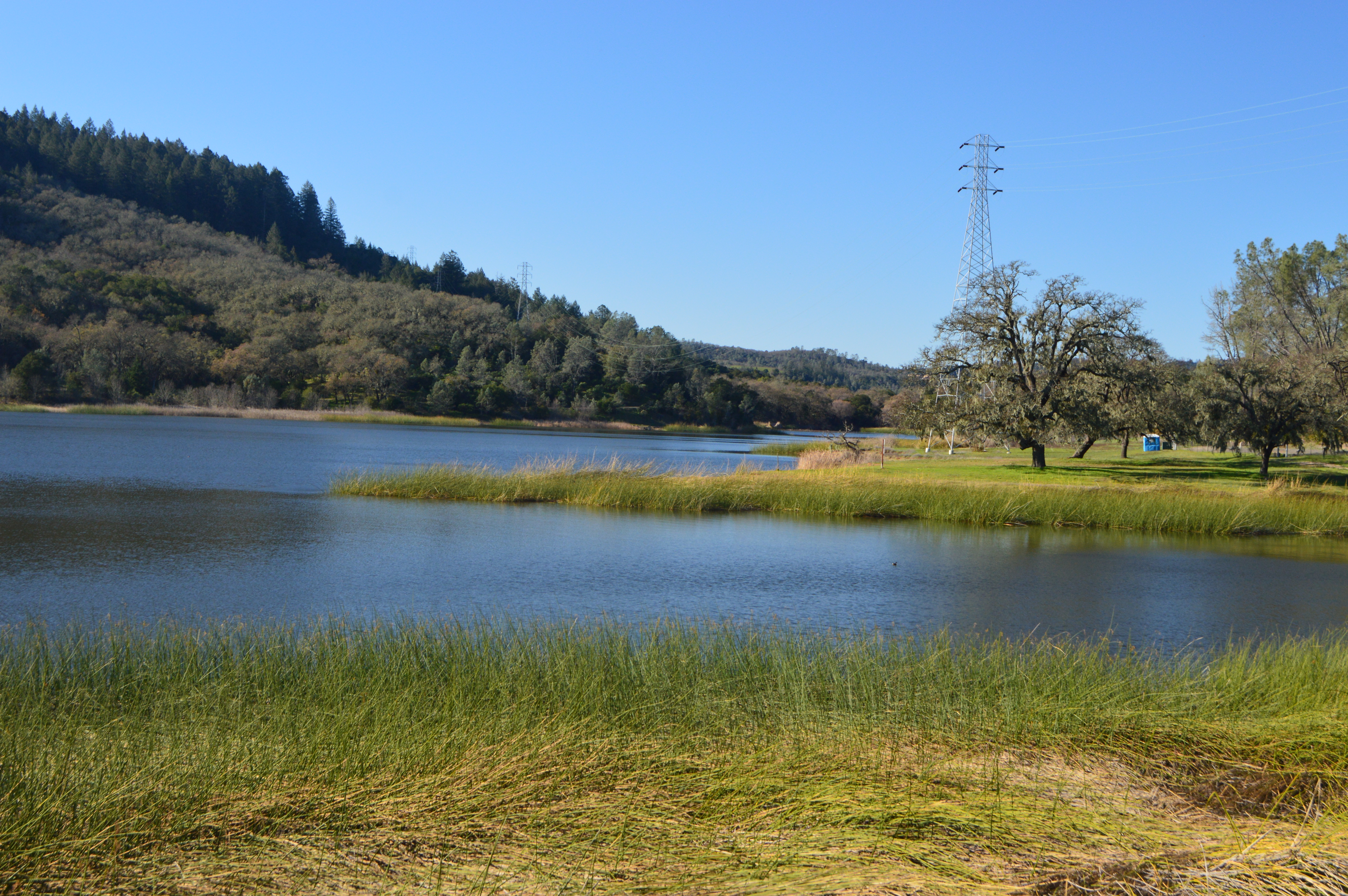

- Location within California Location within the United States
- Location: Vaca Mountains, Napa County, California
- Coordinates: 38°28′52″N 122°22′24″W
- Type: Reservoir
- Primary inflows: Sage Creek, Chiles Creek, Moore Creek, Conn Creek
- Primary outflows: Conn Creek
- Catchment area: 54 sq mi (140 km^{2})
- Basin countries: United States
- Max. length: 2 mi (3.2 km)
- Max. width: 3,500 ft (1,100 m)
- Surface area: 790 acres (320 ha)
- Water volume: 31,000 acre-feet (38,000,000 m^{3})
- Surface elevation: 322 feet (98 m)

Lake Hennessey is a reservoir in the Vaca Mountains, east of St. Helena and the Napa Valley, within Napa County, California.

The reservoir is formed by Conn Creek Dam, built in 1948 (78 years ago) across Conn Creek. Construction of the earthen dam was authorized by the United States Congress when it passed the Flood Control Act of 1944 in order to mitigate flooding downstream in Napa, California.

Funding for the dam was never appropriated by Congress, so in 1946 the City of Napa took on the project and built it at a cost of $550,000 plus $250,000 for the land. The cost of laying the 36 inches (910 mm) diameter pipeline from the dam to the city of Napa was $1.7 million. The 30 miles of pipe for the project was manufactured at the Basalt Rock Company plant located south of Napa. The design of the dam did not include a way to drain water from the reservoir when it comes close to full capacity. Once the lake is full, water drains from a spillway causing potential flooding dangers downstream. The reservoir and pipelines are maintained by the city of Napa, and it is its primary source of water. When the reservoir reaches its capacity, outflow reaches San Pablo Bay via Conn Creek to the Napa River. The lake was named after Edwin R. Hennessey. Hennessey was a local civic leader who played a role in the development of the Conn Valley reservoir.

== Conn Creek Dam ==
Conn Creek Dam is an earthen dam 125 feet (38 m) high and 700 feet (210 m) long containing 500,000 cubic yards (380,000 m^{3}) of material. Its crest is 330 feet (100 m) above sea level. It is owned by the City of Napa.

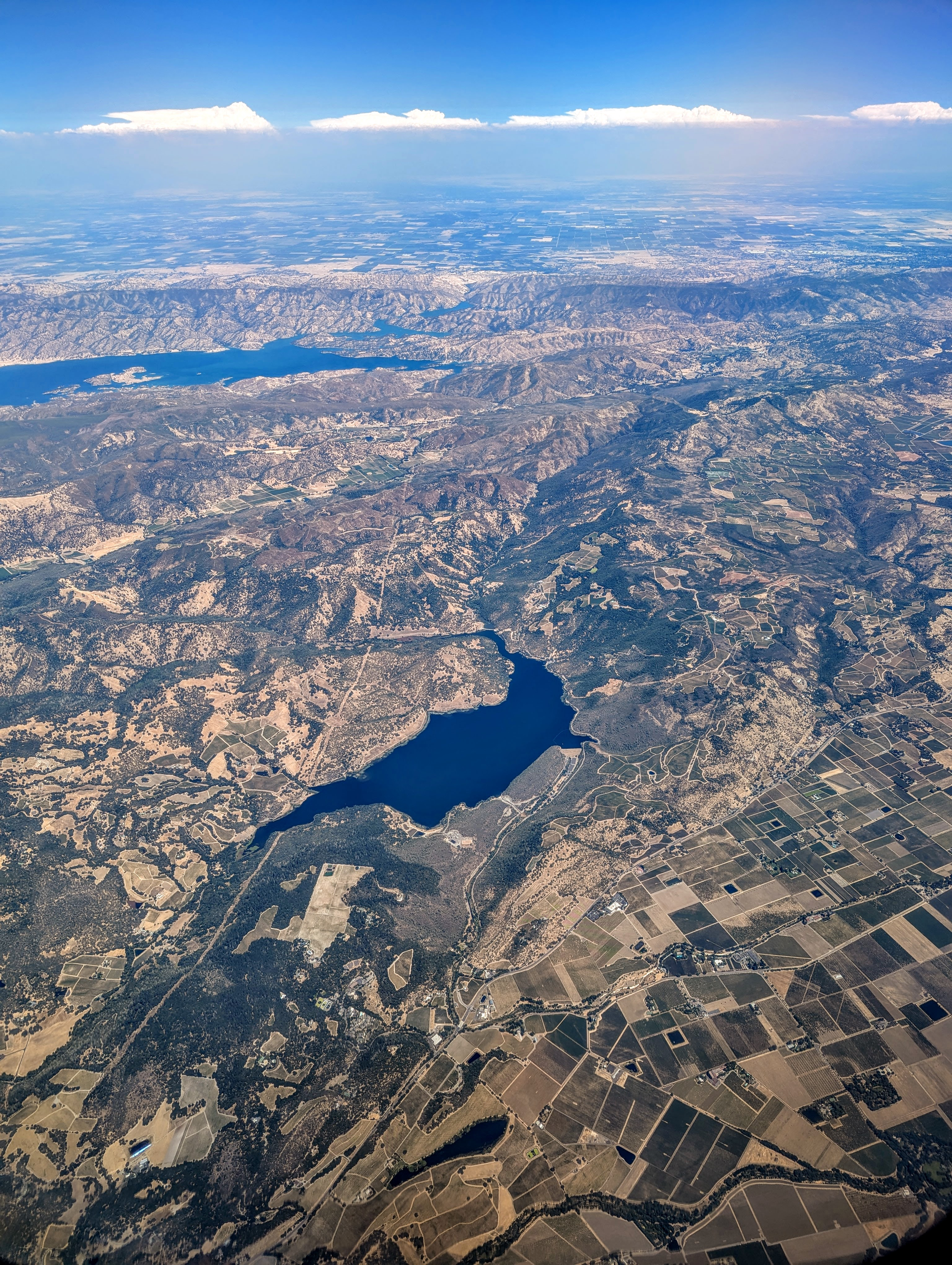
Aerial view of Lake Hennessey and the Silverado Trail vineyards (right foreground) and Lake Berryessa (left background)

== See also ==
- List of reservoirs and dams in California
- List of lakes in the San Francisco Bay Area
