= Rancho Guenoc =

Mexican land grant in California

Coordinates: 38.780°N 122.570°W

Rancho Guenoc (/ˈranʧo ɣeˈnok/ RAN-cho GWE-nok) was a 21,220-acre (33 sq mi) Mexican land grant in present-day Lake County, California given in 1845 by Governor Pio Pico to George Rock. Rancho Guenoc was one of three land grants (along with Rancho Lupyomi and Rancho Collayomi) in Lake County. Lake County was formed in 1861 of land taken mainly from Napa County and the northwest portion taken from Mendocino County.

Rancho Guenoc encompassed essentially all of Coyote Valley including Guenoc, stretching from the range of low mountains just north of Middletown to what is now the southern end of Spruce Grove Road, and from the most westerly curve of Putah Creek eastward and dipping south to encompass what became the Guenoc winery and vineyards.

== History ==
Rancho Guenoc was six square league land grant encompassing essentially all of Coyote Valley. George Rock (also known as George Roche and probably George La Roche) was born about 1785 in Canada and died after 1850. He lived at Guenoc from about 1848, as agent for Jacob P. Leese. In 1850 Rock built a log cabin in the area where the Stone House is now.

George Rock by deed dated 13 Jan 1847 and witnessed by Richard Fowler and Andrew Hoppener, sold Rancho Guenoc to Jacob P. Leese (1809-1892). Leese was a trader from Ohio who had married María Rosalia Vallejo, sister of General Vallejo, and was the owner of the adjacent Rancho Collayomi. Leese evidently abandoned the claim, and Rancho Guenoc was taken over by Captain Archibald Alexander Ritchie and Paul S. Forbes in 1852.

With the cession of California to the United States following the Mexican-American War, the 1848 Treaty of Guadalupe Hidalgo provided that the land grants would be honored. As required by the Land Act of 1851, a claim for Rancho Guenoc was filed with the Public Land Commission in 1852, and the grant was patented to Archibald A. Ritchie and Paul S. Forbes in 1865.

Ritchie was killed in an accident in 1856. Paul Forbes sold his share of both Rancho Guenoc and Rancho Collayomi to one of Ritchie's sons-in-law, Gen. M.D.L. Simpson, in 1867. The following year, Simpson deeded half the lands to Ritchie's wife, Martha and children. The heirs began selling portions of the properties in the early 1870s.

In 1888, the British actress Lillie Langtry, purchased a 4,200 acres (7 sq mi) of Rancho Guenoc to raise racehorses and grapes.

== Historic sites of the Rancho ==
- Stone House (CA Registered Landmark #450)

== See also ==
- Ranchos of California
- List of Ranchos of California
