= Rancho Lupyomi =

Mexican land grant in California

Coordinates: 38.970°N 122.630°W

Rancho Lupyomi (also called "Laguna de Lup Yomi") was a Mexican land grant in present-day Lake County, California given in 1844 by Governor Manuel Micheltorena to Salvador Vallejo and his brother Juan Antonio Vallejo. Rancho Lupyomi encompassed most of the Northern half of Lake County, including all of Clear Lake.

Rancho Lupyomi was one of three land grants (along with Rancho Guenoc and Rancho Collayomi) in Lake County. Lake County was formed in 1861 of land taken mainly from Napa County and the northwest portion taken from Mendocino County.

== History ==
Salvador Vallejo (1813–1876), and his brother Antonio Juan Vallejo (1816–1857) were granted 16 square leagues in 1844.

With the cession of California to the United States following the Mexican–American War, the 1848 Treaty of Guadalupe Hidalgo provided that the land grants would be honored. As required by the Land Act of 1851, Henry F. Teschemacher, Joseph P. Thompson, George H. Howard, and Julius K. Rose filed a claim for 14 square leagues Rancho Lupyomi with the Public Land Commission in 1853. The claim was rejected by the Commission in 1853, confirmed by the US District Court in 1855, but reversed by the US Supreme Court. A two square league claim for Rancho Lupyomi filed in 1853 by Salvador Vallejo was rejected by the Commission in 1855. An eleven square league claim for Rancho Lupyomi filed in 1853 by Joseph Yves Limantour was rejected by the Commission in 1855.

== See also ==
- Ranchos of California
- List of Ranchos of California
