= Howell Mountains =

Mountain range in California, United States

- (Mt. George Range)
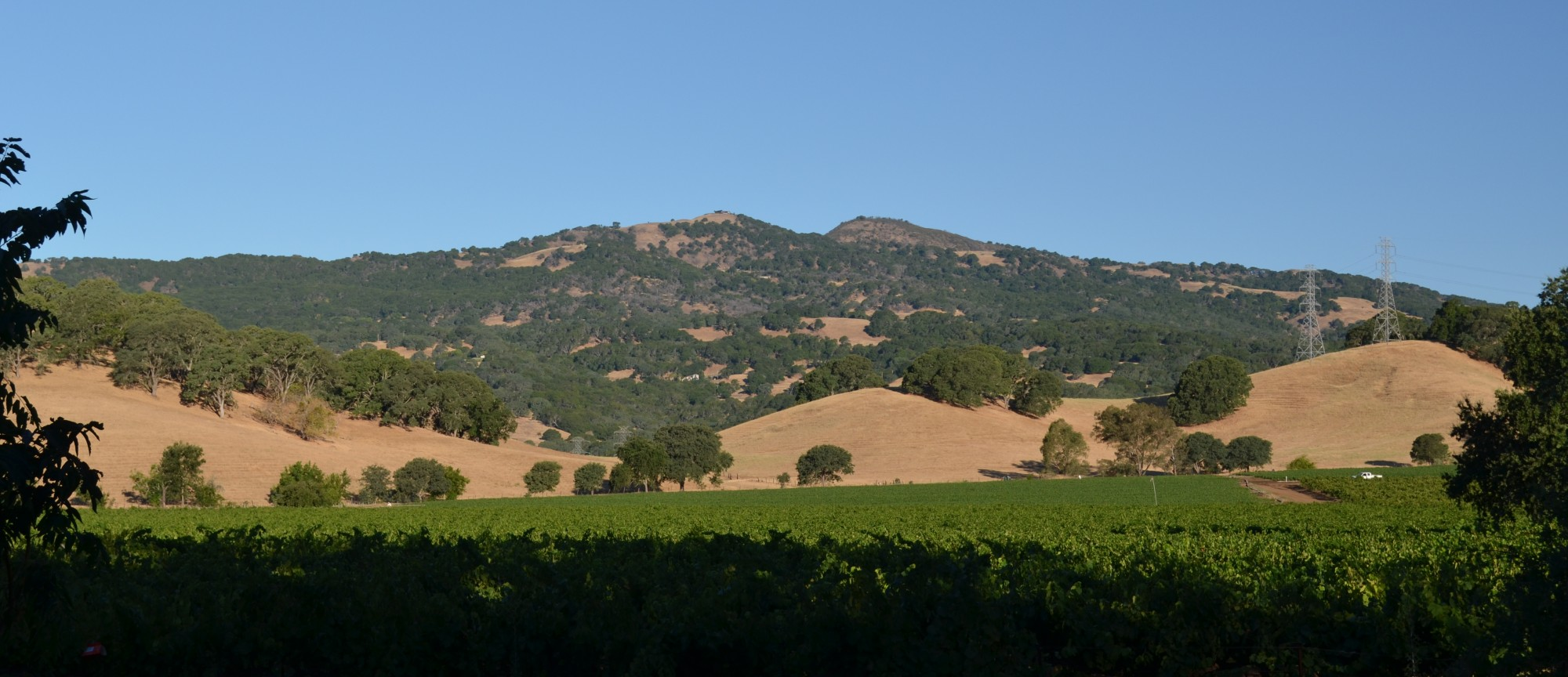
- Twin Sisters, seen here from Suisun Valley, is the highest summit in the Howell Mountains

Highest point
- Peak: Twin Sisters
- Elevation: 2,162 ft (659 m)

Geography
- Location within California
- Country: United States
- State: California
- Counties: Napa County, Solano County
- Range coordinates: 38°18′24″N 122°10′16″W

The Howell Mountains, which are also known as the Mt. George Range, are one of the California Coast Ranges. They divide the Suisun Valley on the east side, from Napa Valley on the west. Historically the southern part of the range has been referred to as both the Sierra de Suscol (Suscol Hills) and as the Sierra de Napa (Napa Hills).

== Geography ==
The Howell Mountains begin at Sulphur Springs Mountain, near the towns of Vallejo and Benicia, and just north of the estuary where the Sacramento River flows into San Francisco Bay. The range then trends to the north and northwest for about 40 miles (64 km) to Howell Mountain, just northeast of St. Helena, California, where it merges with the Mayacamas Mountains. The Vaca Mountains, which are separated from the Howell Mountains by Suisun Valley on the east side, merge with the latter range northeast of St. Helena also. The crest of the range, which culminates at 2,162 feet (659 m) feet in the twin summit of Twin Sisters, represents the divide between the drainage of the Napa River on the west side, and Suisun and Green Valley Creeks on the east. Although Twin Sisters is the high point, both Howell Mountain and Mt. George to the north are better known, due to proximity to grape-growing regions that are popular tourist destinations.

== Climate ==
The Howell Mountains have Mediterranean climate with a cool rainy winter, and a warm dry summer with high temperatures up to 100 °F (38 °C) at lower elevations. Average annual rainfall ranges from 40 inches (1,016 mm) per year at Howell Mountain in the north, to 30 inches (762 mm) per year at Mt. George, to 20 inches (508 mm) per year at Benicia in the south. Rainfall is similar on both the west and east sides of the range, with no noticeable rain shadow effect. Because gentle winds blowing inland from the estuary at San Pablo Bay and Suisun Bay are common, hard frosts are very rare, which makes the lower slopes of the mountains ideal for growing grapes, olives and fruit trees.

== Geology ==
Although bedrock in most parts of the Howell Mountains is a geologic formation of volcanic origin known as the Sonoma Volcanics, older sedimentary rocks of the Cretaceous age Great Valley Sequence are found in the Benicia area at the southern end of the range, and in the Lake Hennessey area to the east of St. Helena. The Sonoma volcanics, which make up bedrock in all of the grape-growing areas of the Napa Valley side, are late Miocene to early Pleistocene in age, and made up largely of silica-rich rhyolite tuffs and breccias interbedded with silica-poor andesite and basalt lava flows, with some volcanic gravels that are related to fluvial processes. Serpentine is found in a few places where older sedimentary rocks are faulted against younger volcanics, and in some of these same areas, particularly around Sulphur Springs Mountain at the southern terminous, cinnabar deposits were mined in the late 1800s for quicksilver.

== Agriculture and grazing ==
The west slope of the Howell Mountains is noted for its vineyards and wineries, which tend to be located where the soils are derived from rhyolite tuffs. Although rhyolitic rocks generally weather to soils that are considered to be nutrient poor, the Howell Mountain American Viticultural Area and other wine appellation districts located on the west slope claim that grape vines planted in these soils are stressed and as a consequence produce wine grapes that are superior in quality for wine making when compared to grapes grown on unstressed vines planted in the richer loams of the valley floor. Despite the observation that volcanic soils on the east slope (Suisun Valley side) are similar to those on the west slope (Napa Valley side), cattle grazing predominates on the east slope and vineyards are few.

== Origin of name ==
Although an 1842 Spanish land grant map clearly names the range of hills between the Suscol (Napa Valley) and Suisun Ranchos, and extending as far north as the Howell Mountain area as the "Sierras de Suscol" (Suscol Hills), this name is somewhat interchangeable today with "Sierra de Napa" (Napa Hills) and applies generally to the southernmost part of the range that looks down on the towns of Vallejo and Benicia. With the transformation of the northern Napa Valley into a premier wine-producing area and tourist attraction, names for the range such as the Howell Mountains and Mt. George Range that have more northerly derivations have become more popular. The fact that none of these names are recognized by the United States Geographical Survey means that the range has no official designation.

Pioneer Isaac Howell and his family came to California in 1846. The family came to Napa Valley by 1848 and then settled up on the mountain which was part of Rancho Carne Humana by 1850 . Historians have argued over which Howell the mountain was named after---Isaac or his son John. Since both lived up there until 1868, people probably were referring to the whole group of Howells. Howell Mountain is named after John Howell, who, with a partner in 1856, opened at St. Helena the first blacksmith shop in Napa County. Howell Mountains was ultimately applied as well to the peaks to the south that separate Napa Valley from Suisun Valley. For example, Kunkel and Upson (1960) identify the Howell Mountains in their report on the geology and water resources of Napa County, and it is used similarly in other agricultural and geological publications, as well as by the wine industry, and in Napa County and Solano County reports. Because these mountains are not officially named, they are sometimes referred to as either the Mayacamas or Vaca Mountains, which leads to confusion as the Howell Mountains for much of their extent are topographically and geologically distinct from adjacent ranges.

== See also ==
- Howell Mountain AVA
- Suisun Valley AVA
- Sulphur Springs Mountain
- Twin Sisters
