= Mount Vaca =

Mountain in California, United States

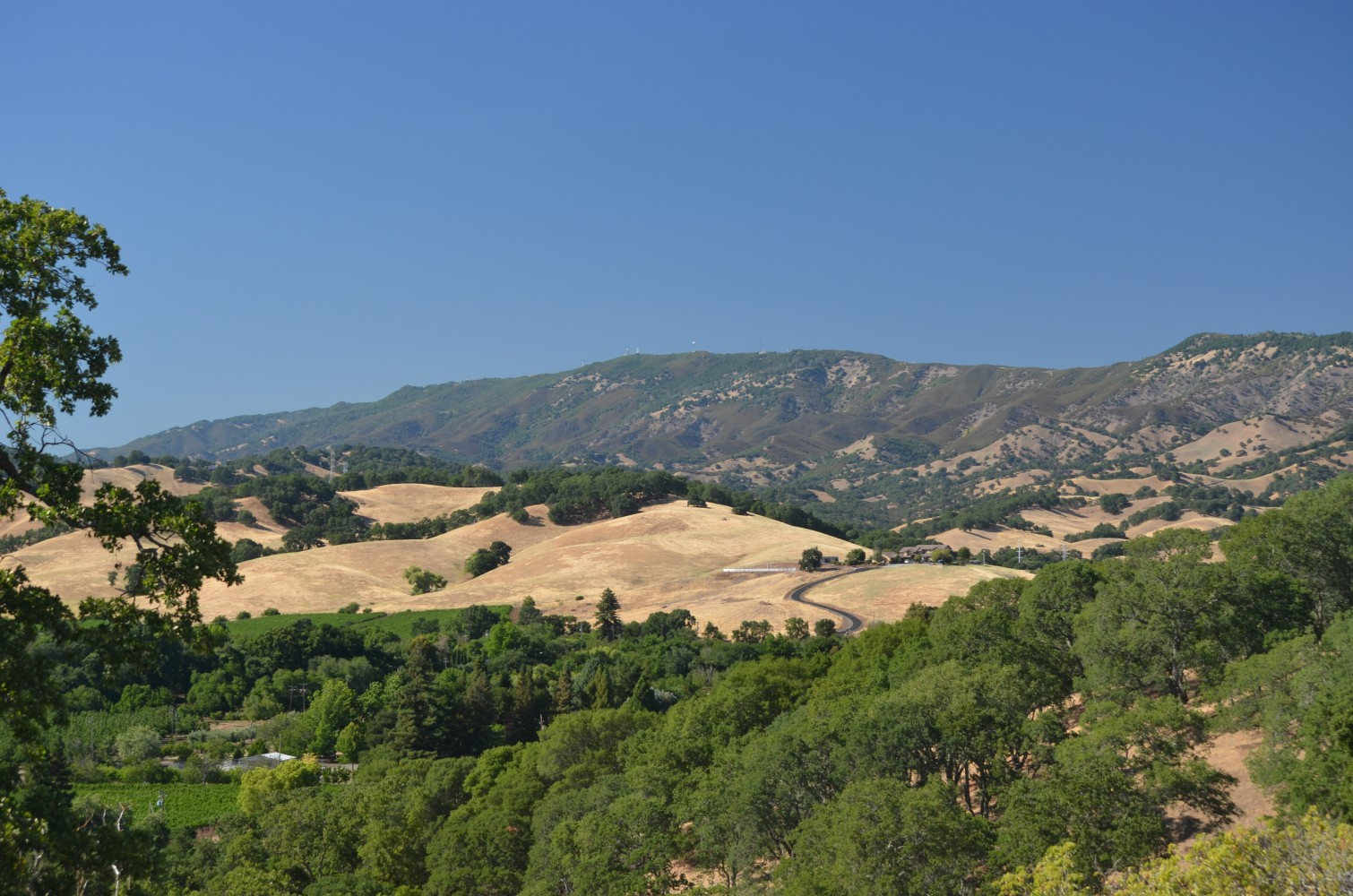
- Mt. Vaca and the Blue Ridge, high points of Solano County, as seen from upper Suisun Valley.

Highest point
- Elevation: 2,822 ft (860 m) NAVD 88
- Prominence: 1,959 ft (597 m)
- Listing: California county high points 53rd
- Coordinates: 38°24′01″N 122°06′22″W

Geography
- Location within California
- Location: Napa and Solano counties, California, U.S.
- Parent range: Vaca Mountains
- Topo map: USGS Mount Vaca

Mount Vaca is a mountain in Napa and Solano counties of Northern California. It is both the highest point in the Vaca Mountains and in Solano County. It is also one of several peaks in the San Francisco Bay Area that receive winter snow.

== Origin of name ==
Vaca is the Spanish word for cow. Although cattle ranching historically played an important role in the area, Mount Vaca and the nearby city of Vacaville are actually named for Juan Manuel Cabeza Vaca (1782–1856), who with Juan Felipe Pena received in 1843 the Rancho Los Putos Mexican land grant, which included the peak that now bears Vaca's name.

== Public access ==
The summit of Mount Vaca is reached via either Mix Canyon Road or Gates Canyon Road, both of which originate in Vacaville California. These roads intersect Blue Ridge Road, which follows the ridge top to the summit.

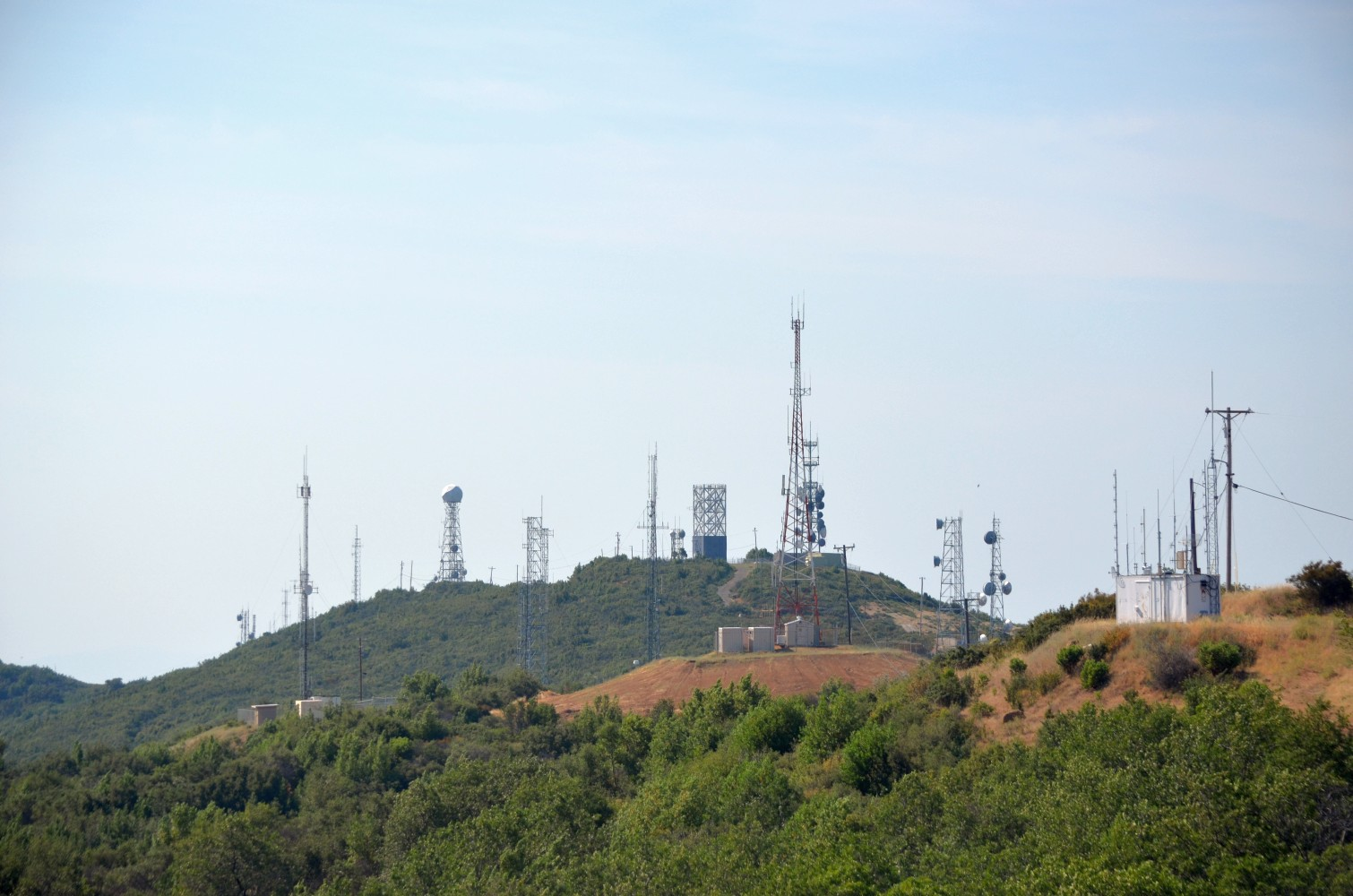
Doppler Radar weather tower on top of Mt. Vaca.

== High-definition Doppler weather radar ==
The San Francisco Bay Area is surrounded by mountain ranges that obstruct weather radar, even government broadcasts, thereby leaving blind spots in the weather prediction system. As a consequence, television station KPIX-TV, a San Francisco CBS affiliate, partnered with the National Oceanic and Atmospheric Administration (NOAA) to build a Doppler weather radar on top of Mt. Vaca. Before this, the mountain blocked radar information about storms coming in from the Northwest, which compromised weather prediction and allowed for flooding, heavy rains, and high winds without prior warnings. This new radar system gives meteorologists a more complete view of precipitation and temperature patterns in the Bay Area, and allows for more accurate weather predictions.

== See also ==
- List of highest points in California by county
- List of summits of the San Francisco Bay Area
