= Archibald Alexander Ritchie =

American businessman (1806–1856)

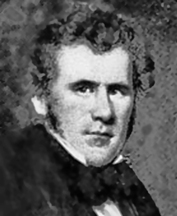
- Born: 28 January 1806; New Castle County, Delaware, US
- Died: 9 July 1856 (aged 50); Napa County, California, US

Archibald Alexander Ritchie (28 January 1806 – 9 July 1856) was an American ship captain, China trader, and California businessman.

== Early years ==
Ritchie's family originated in Scotland and Ireland. His grandfather, William Ritchie, was born on board the ship carrying Ritchie's great-grandparents to America. His father, Hugh Ritchie, married Esther Alexander, of a family that had emigrated to Virginia in 1737. Archibald Alexander Ritchie was born in New Castle, Delaware on 28 January 1806. He was expected to join the navy, but ran away from home at the age of 13 and joined a ship that was sailing to China. At the age of 18 he was captain of the Treaty, owned by the Marine Insurance Company of Philadelphia.

In 1831 Ritchie married Martha Hamilton of Philadelphia. In 1832 their first child, Eliza, was born while he was away on a voyage to bring tea and silk from China. In 1838 Ritchie was appointed resident agent in Canton (Guangzhou) for Platt and Sons of Philadelphia. The company traded hides, tallow and otter skins from California in exchange for goods from China. His wife and children joined him in Macau, near Canton. At least four of their children were born there. The family returned to Philadelphia in 1847.

== California ==
Ritchie travelled to California during the California Gold Rush (1848–1855). He saw that there were businesses opportunities in supplying the miners who were passing through San Francisco.

In 1850 Ritchie paid Jacob P. Leese $14,000 (~$408,540 in 2024) for the 21,200 acres (8,600 ha) Rancho Guenoc and the adjoining 8,200 acres (3,300 ha) Rancho Collayomi, where the town of Middletown is today. Also in 1850, he paid General Mariano Guadalupe Vallejo $50,000 (~$1.46 million in 2024) for the Suisun land grant. He put up $10,000 in cash for Rancho Suisun and took out a mortgage for the remaining $40,000. Three days later Captain Robert Henry Waterman bought a 1/3 interest in the Suisun property for $16,666. Waterman had also been engaged in the China trade, and became Ritchie's partner. Ritchie held rights to all the hot springs in the upper Napa Valley. He sold part of what is now Calistoga to Samuel Brannan, who founded the well known resort there. Ritchie wrote in 1851 to his wife Martha, who was living in New Castle, Delaware,

You can’t imagine what lovely country and climate this is ... If you were here, dearest, you’d never want to leave this country again ... I smiled at your fears from my settlers (not squatters) in Suisun. There are some scamps amongst them whom I shall have to stir up by and by, but most of them are first rate men and on friendly terms with me. I look for no trouble and certainly no danger. “You probably will not see the papers, but I have been amused at the frequent notice taken of Capt. Ritchie and the lovely Valley of Suisun. There is, I fancy, no doubt of my title being good and when confirmed the property will be of immense value.

Ritchie's land was supposed to be vacant, but in fact had various squatters who had to be removed. Ritchie noted that the squatters in Suisun included "men of means, lawyers, doctors, with fine farms and families". Many lawsuits followed to remove the squatters, as well as physical violence. In 1852 Ritchie and Paul S. Forbes filed claims for the Guenoc and Collayomi properties under the new land title laws established with California’s statehood. Ritchie had bought a lot in Benicia in 1850, which he promoted as the state capital, and built a fine house there. In 1854, about the time Ritchie's wife came to join him with their children, the house was burned down. It was said that the fire had been set by dispossessed squatters from Suisun. The Ritchies arranged for another house to be built for them in the South Park development of San Francisco, which was completed shortly before Ritchie died.

Ritchie was a member of the committee that arranged relief for victims of the Acapulco Earthquake of 1852. When the St. Louis banking house of Page, Bacon & Co. failed in February 1855 it caused a crisis that led to 200 businesses failing in San Francisco. Ritchie was one of the 25 businessmen elected to try to reduce the panic. In 1856 Ritchie backed John Nugent of the San Francisco Herald in his attacks on the Second Vigilance Committee. Ritchie was thrown from his buggy and died on 9 July 1856 when travelling from Sonoma to Napa. A witness said Ritchie "simply reared up and pitched over". His death was recorded as being due to apoplexy.

== Legacy ==
Ritchie was buried in the Yerba Buena Cemetery, and his body was later moved to Laurel Hill. After another move, he is now buried in Cypress Lawn Memorial Park, Colma, San Mateo County, California.

His partner, Robert Henry Waterman, was Ritchie's executor. It took fourteen years for his will to clear probate. In 1861, when Lake County was split off from Napa County, John Cobb was hired to manage Rancho Guenoc and Rancho Collayomi. The Guenoc and Collayomi grants were only approved in 1863 and 1865. The probate was settled in 1868. By 1870 the Ritchie family had started to split the Guenoc property into smaller units that were offered for sale, and the south of Lake County began to be developed.

== Sources ==
- Bouska, Nina (23 April 2011), "Lake County 150: South Lake County", Lake County News
- Goerke-Shrode, Sabine (22 August 2004), Capt. Ritchie battles for his land holdings, Vacaville Heritage Council and Solano County Historical Society
- "John Cobb", South Lake County, California, History, South Lake County Historical Society
- Shumate, Albert (1991), A.A. Ritchie, California Pioneer, Society of California Pioneers
