= Jacob P. Leese =

American pioneer (1809–1892)

Jacob Leese Jacobo Leese
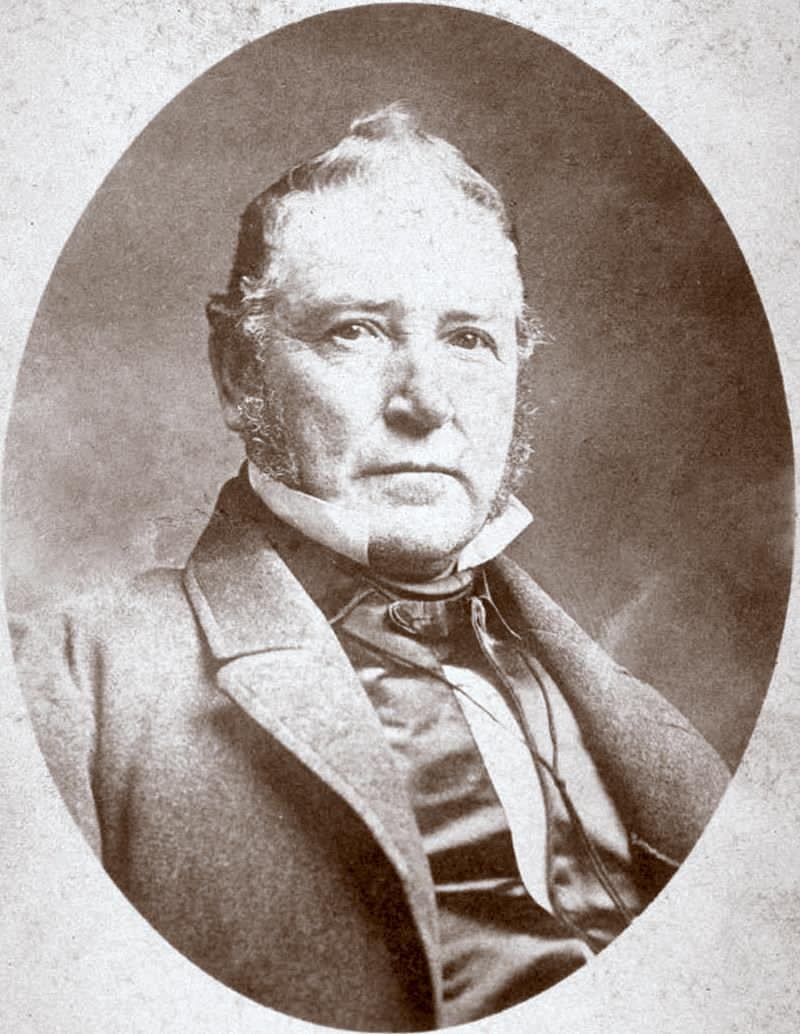
- Born: August 19, 1809; St. Clairsville, Ohio, US
- Died: February 1, 1892 (aged 82); San Francisco, California, US
- Occupations: Entrepreneur, Rancher
- Known for: Early California pioneer
- Spouse: María Rosalia Vallejo

Jacob Primer Leese (August 19, 1809 – February 1, 1892), known in Spanish as Don Jacobo Leese, was an Ohio-born Californian ranchero, entrepreneur, and public servant. He was an early resident of San Francisco and married into the family of prominent Californio statesman and general Mariano Guadalupe Vallejo, which elevated his rank in Californian society and allowed him to acquire several ranchos.

== Early life ==
Jacob Primer Leese was born in Ohio and became active in the Santa Fe, New Mexico trade in 1830. Leese first came to California from New Mexico in 1833, but did not remain (and for a time transported mules between New Mexico and Southern California). He returned in July 1834, settled in Los Angeles and went into partnership with Hugo Reid.

== Yerba Buena ==
Two years later he formed a partnership with two established Monterey merchants, William S. Hinckley and Nathan Spear, for the purpose of starting a store in Yerba Buena. In 1836, he was the second permanent settler of the new town established by William A. Richardson in 1835. Leese built for his residence (at what is now Grant and Clay), the first substantial structure. It was preceded only by a tent house put up by Richardson the year before, before Richardson also built a permanent house in 1836. Leese built a store in 1837 on Montgomery Street near Sacramento Street which did business mainly with the large ranches in San Francisco Bay area and the ships which came to California seeking hides and tallow.

In 1837 Leese married María Rosalia Vallejo, sister of General Mariano Guadalupe Vallejo. The partnership with Hinckley and Spear ended in 1838. Leese continued the business alone until 1841, when he sold out to the Hudson's Bay Company and transferred his business and residence to Sonoma.

== Sonoma ==
In 1841 he was granted Rancho Huichica in Napa County. In 1841 he was also granted the two leagues Rancho Canada de Guadalupe la Visitacion y Rodeo Viejo on the San Francisco Peninsula, which Leese soon exchanged for Ridley's three leagues Rancho Collayomi in Lake County. Leese moved to Sonoma in 1841, where he was alcalde in 1844. During the Bear Flag Revolt of 1846, Leese was taken prisoner with Vallejo and held captive at Sutter's Fort. He figured somewhat conspicuously in the historic Bear Flag revolt as interpreter for the contending force. In 1846 he was associated with Thomas O. Larkin in executing his plans of annexation to the United States.

== Monterey ==
Leese moved to Monterey in 1849. He and Larkin traded real estate. Larkin purchased an interest in Rancho Huichica. In 1852, Leese bought Rancho Sausal in Monterey County. Salinas is located on Rancho Sausal land, and Leese is considered to be one of the founders of Salinas, although he left the area in 1865 and did not return until 1885.

== New York ==
In 1863 he, with others, worked on obtaining a concession from the Mexican government for two thirds of Baja California lands for colonization purposes. To work on the project, he moved to New York in 1865, leaving his family in Monterey. The enterprise was not successful.

== Return to San Francisco ==
Leese returned to San Francisco in 1885 after an absence of 20 years. Rosalia Vallejo died in 1889. Jacob P. Leese died on February 1, 1892, in San Francisco.

== Legacy ==
Leese Street in San Francisco is named for him. His son, Jacob R. Leese, was born in 1839, served as Monterey County Clerk and as a deputy sheriff. He was also postmaster of Salinas, and later, postmaster of Monterey.
