= Sonoma Volcanics =

Geologic formation of volcanic origin in California

- Stratigraphic range: Pliocene
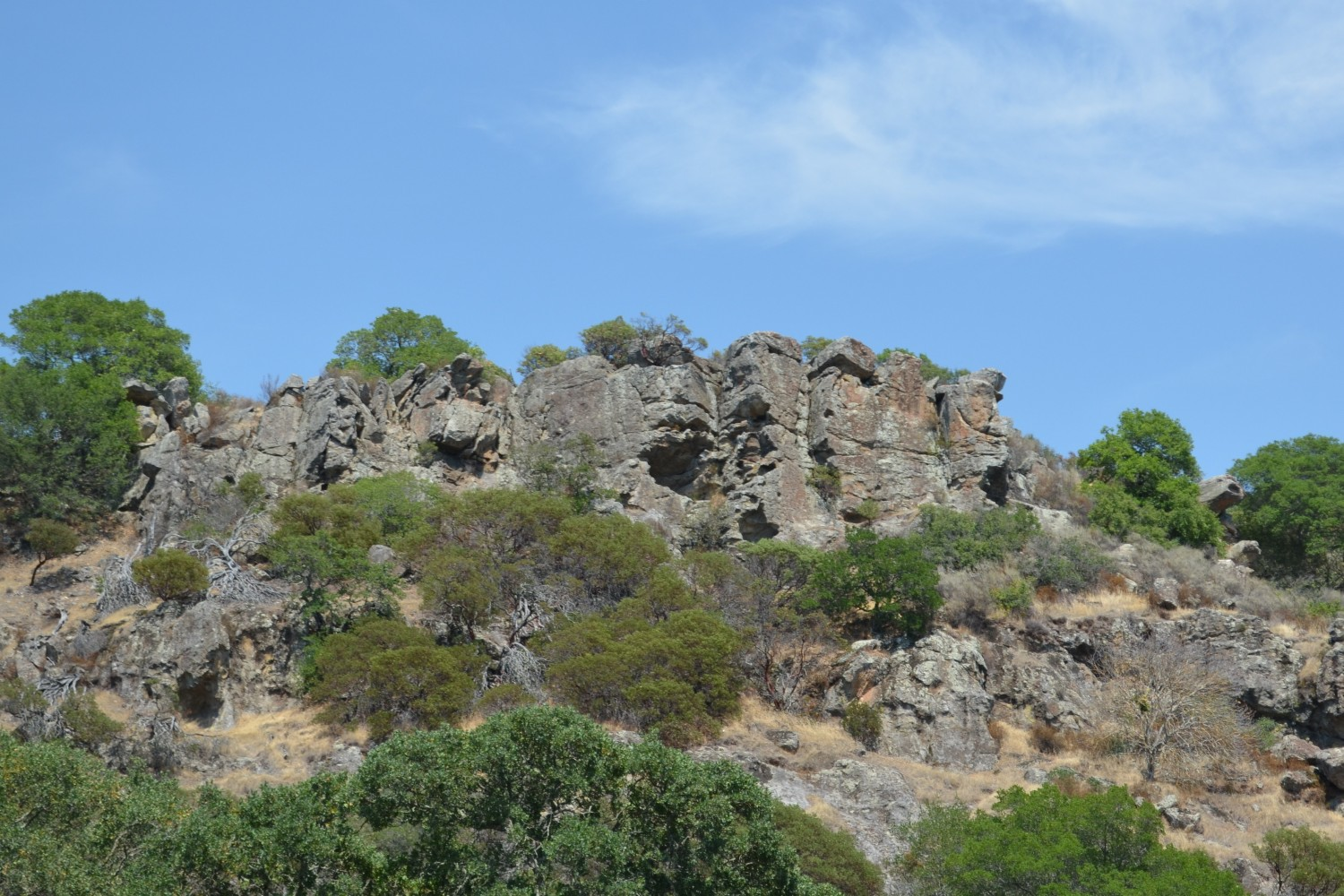
- Pyroclastic breccias and interbedded tuffs of the Sonoma Volcanics at Rockville, California.
- Type: volcanic
- Underlies: Huichica Formation (Pleistocene)
- Overlies: Neroly Sandstone (Miocene)

Lithology
- Primary: andesite and rhyolite
- Other: basalt

Location
- Region: Napa County and Sonoma County, Northern California
- Country: United States

Type section
- Named for: Sonoma Valley
- Named by: Osmont (1905), and Dickerson (1922)

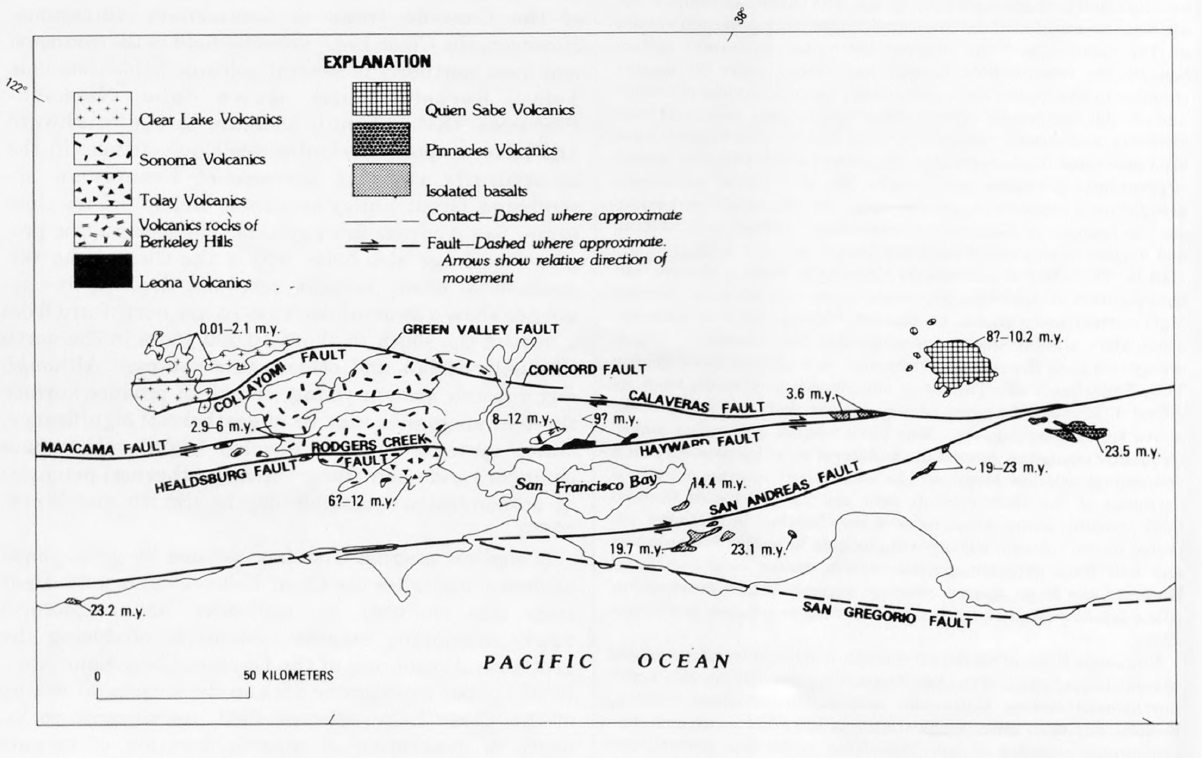
Geological map of the Sonoma Volcanics

The Sonoma Volcanics are a geologic formation of volcanic origin that is widespread in Napa and Sonoma counties, California. Most of the formation is Pliocene in age and includes obsidian, perlitic glass, diatomaceous mud, pyroclastic tuff, pumice, rhyolite tuffs, andesite breccias and interbedded volcanic (basalt) lava flows. The formation serves as the parent material for many of the soils in the Napa and Sonoma wine regions.

"The Sonoma volcanics underlie and form most of the mountain areas bordering the Napa and Sonoma Valleys except for small areas underlain by the older sedimentary and metamorphic rocks. A thick extensive body of tuffs and flows forms the Howell Mountains east of Napa and extends from Jamison Canyon northward into the area north of Mount St. Helena. The volcanic rocks crop out in a narrow, discontinuous strip along the west side of the alluvial plain of Napa Valley, and on that side also they extend northward to Mount St. Helena. They compose most of the Mayacamas Mountains and flank the east and north sides of Sonoma Valley. They occur along the west side of Sonoma Valley, where they form the Sonoma Mountains. These bodies are parts of a once-continuous mass that probably extended from San Pablo Bay northward into southern Lake County, and from Green Valley in Solano County westward to Santa Rosa Valley. The Sonoma volcanics are several thousand feet thick."

"The materials composing the Sonoma volcanics were erupted probably from several vents within the area, and intermittently over a period perhaps more than 1 million years long. The materials were extremely varied in chemical composition and in eruptive character, so that they formed a complex assemblage of flows, dikes, plugs, mudflows, breccias, pumice beds, and intercalated bodies of stratified material mostly volcanic in composition but sedimentary in deposition. Except for dikes and plugs, the materials were highly lenticular."

== Readings ==
- R.J. McLaughlin; A.M. Sarna-Wojcicki; R.J. Fleck; W.H. Wright; V.R.G. Levin & Z.C. Valin (2004). "Geology, Tephrochronology, Radiometric Ages, and Cross Sections of the Mark West Springs 7.5' Quadrangle, Sonoma and Napa Counties, California" (PDF). U.S. Geological Survey.
- Charles L. Powell; James R. Allen & Peter J. Holland (2004). "Invertebrate paleontology of the Wilson Grove Formation (late Miocene to late Pliocene), Sonoma and Marin Counties, California, with some observations on its stratigraphy, thickness, and structure". U. S. Geological Survey.
- R.W. Graymer; E.E. Brabb; D.L. Jones; J. Barnes; R.S. Nicholson; R.E. Stamski (2007). "Geologic Map and Map Database of Eastern Sonoma and Western Napa Counties, California". U. S. Geological Survey.
