= Guenoc, California =

Guenoc
- Former settlement
- Location in California
- Coordinates: 38°47′21″N 122°33′57″W
- Country: United States
- State: California
- County: Lake
- Elevation: 968 ft (295 m)

Guenoc is a former settlement in Lake County, California, United States. It was located in the Coyote Valley, 4 miles (6 km) northeast of Middletown, at an elevation of 968 feet (295 m).

Guenoc was founded in 1866. Its first store opened in 1866. The Guenoc region was planted with vineyards in the 1880s, where Burgundy varietals were grown. Thoroughbred horses were also raised in the area, where actress Lillie Langtry lived for a time on a still-extant ranch. In 2020, the Guenoc Valley was approved as the site of a large rural mixed-use housing development, the Guenoc Valley Project.

A post office operated at Guenoc from 1867 to 1880.
