= Rancho Collayomi =

Mexican land grant in California

Coordinates: 38.750°N 122.610°W

Rancho Collayomi (also called Rancho Callayomi) was a 8,242-acre (33.35 km^{2}) Mexican land grant in present-day Lake County, California given in 1844 by Governor Manuel Micheltorena to Robert T. Ridley. Rancho Collayomi was one of three land grants (along with Rancho Lupyomi and Rancho Guenoc) in Lake County. Lake County was formed in 1861 of land taken mainly from Napa County and the northwest portion taken from Mendocino County.

== History ==
Rancho Collayomi encompassed three square leagues in the Loconoma Valley. Robert T. Ridley (1818 - 1851) was an English sailor who was captain of the Port of San Francisco. In 1843, Ridley traded his three league Rancho Collayomi grant to Jacob P. Leese for the two league Rancho Canada de Guadalupe la Visitacion y Rodeo Viejo near San Francisco. Jacob Primer Leese (1809 - 1892), was a trader from Ohio who had married María Rosalia Vallejo sister of General Vallejo, and was the owner of the adjacent Rancho Guenoc.

With the cession of California to the United States following the Mexican-American War, the 1848 Treaty of Guadalupe Hidalgo provided that the land grants would be honored. As required by the Land Act of 1851, a claim for Rancho Collayomi was filed with the Public Land Commission in 1852, and the grant was patented to Archibald A. Ritchie and Paul.S. Forbes in 1863.

Ritchie was killed in an accident in 1856. Paul Forbes sold his share of both Rancho Guenoc and Rancho Collayomi to one of Ritchie's sons-in-law, Gen. M.D.L. Simpson, in 1867. The following year, Simpson deeded half the lands to Ritchie's wife, Martha and children. The heirs began selling portions of the properties in the early 1870s.
