= Vaca Mountains =

Mountain range in California

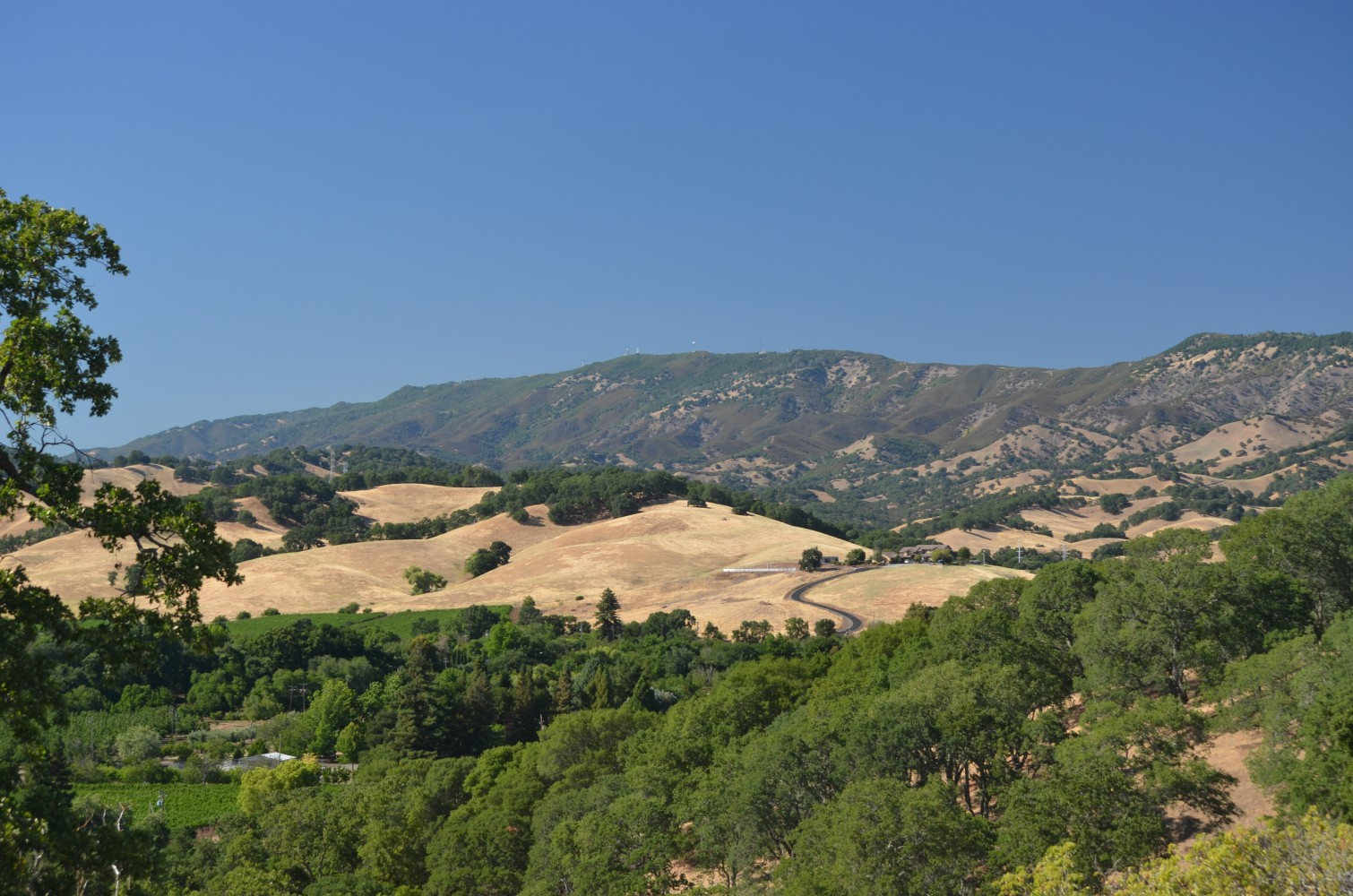
- Mt. Vaca and the Blue Ridge, high points of Solano County, as seen from upper Suisun Valley.

Highest point
- Peak: Mount Vaca
- Elevation: 859 m (2,818 ft)

Geography
- Location within California
- Country: United States
- State: California
- Region(s): Napa County, Solano County
- Range coordinates: 38°24′01″N 122°06′22″W
- Topo map: USGS Mount Vaca

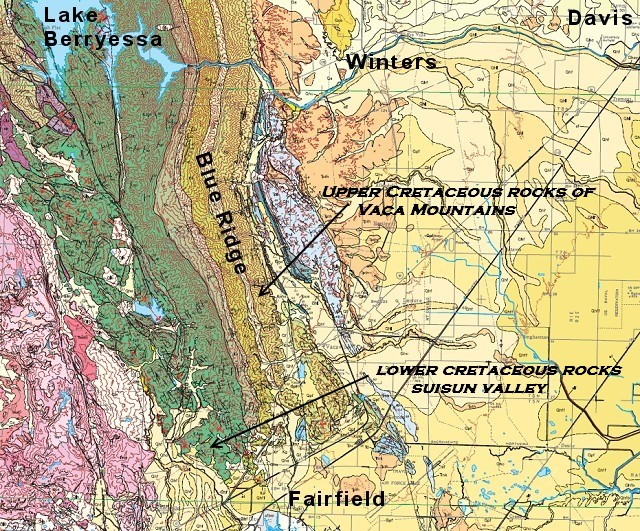
Geologic map of the Vaca Mountains showing east-dipping strata of the Cretaceous Great Valley Sequence that make up the core of the range. The Lake Berryessa Reservoir is at the top left corner.

The Vaca Mountains are a mountain range in Napa and Solano Counties, California that is one of the California Coast Ranges. They represent the easternmost of the Inner Coast Ranges in north−central California, and divide the Suisun Valley on their west, from the Sacramento Valley on their east.

== Geography ==
The Vaca Mountains are one of the most prominent landmarks of Solano County, with a steep ridge on the east side that rises abruptly 1,000 feet (305 m) or more above the foothills below. The range begins at Suisun Marsh in a broad, low-elevation saddle that also contains the city of Fairfield and Travis Air Force Base, and separates the mountains to the northwest from an outlier of low hills called the Montezuma Hills. The Vaca Mountains then trend 17.5 miles (28 km) to the north and end at Putah Creek Canyon. The average width of the range is about 5.5 miles (9 km), with an area of 61,775 acres (250 km^{2}) that is mostly undeveloped. Mt. Vaca at an elevation 2,818 feet (859 m) is the highest summit, and the high point of Solano County, but the backbone of the range is the Blue Ridge, a prominent ridgetop that maintains an elevation of over 1,900 feet (579 m) for several miles.

Where the Blue Ridge seemingly ends abruptly at Putah Creek Canyon, the mountains continue on the north side of the canyon as the Blue Ridge Range, which is topographically and geologically similar to the Vaca Mountains. Because the canyon is difficult to distinguish from most vantage points on the east side, the Vaca and Blue Ridge Mountains present what appears to be a nearly continuous ridge line that defines the west margin of the Sacramento Valley, which is the northern half of the 400-mile-long (640 km) Central Valley of California.

== Climate, ecology and agriculture ==
The Vaca Mountains have a typical California climate with a cool wet season lasting from November to April, followed by a warm dry season. Because the Vacas are the easternmost of the Coast Ranges, they are subject to the "rain shadow" effect and rainfall is considerably less than in ranges to the west, such as the Mayacamas Mountains, which are closer to the Pacific Ocean. Mean rainfall averages 25 to 30 inches (635 to 762 mm) a year, with nearly all rain falling during the wet season. Snow does fall on Mt. Vaca and Blue Ridge during unusually cold winters, but very seldom on the lower slopes. Temperatures range from lows of 40 to 50 °F (4 to 10 °C) during the wet season, to highs of over 100 °F (38 °C) during the dry season. Because almost all rain falls during the wet season, fire danger is particularly high during the hot summers and early fall.

The reasonably abundant winter rainfall results in a diverse assemblage of plants, with chaparral stands of chamise (Adenostoma), buckbrush (Ceanothus) and manzanita (Arctostaphylos) on the ridgetops, grasslands with oak trees (Quercus) and poison oak (Toxicodendron) on the slopes, and riparian habitats in canyons with year-round streams. Because of steep topography, the land is largely undeveloped and the native plants undisturbed. However, there is some agriculture in the lower foothills, with wine grapes on the west (Solano County) slopes, and fruit and nut orchards on the east (Yolo County) slopes. Illicit marijuana growing operations are common on the Solano County side of the mountains.

== Geology ==
Bedrock throughout most of the Vaca Mountains are sedimentary rocks of the Great Valley Sequence that are Cretaceous in age (65-145 ma). These rocks are represented by shale and interbedded sandstone that are thought to have been deposited in a deep-marine setting as submarine fans, sourced by sediment shed during uplift of the ancestral Sierra Nevada. There is also minor conglomerate that may represent the fill of ancient submarine canyons developed at the heads of these fans. Because the sedimentary layers that make up the Vaca Mountains strike parallel to the crest of the range and dip down to east, these strata have eroded to create a steep escarpment on the west side with a much more gentle slope on the east side.

There are also isolated outcrops of prominent black basaltic rocks, the Putnam Peak Basalt, in particular near Vacaville in the southern part of the range, at Putnam Peak in the middle part, and in Putah Creek Canyon at the northern terminus. This basalt dates at 15-16 ma, which makes it Miocene in age, so it is much younger than the Great Valley Sequence. It is thought to represent remnants from an ancient volcanic eruption on the east side of the Sierra Nevada of an especially fluid flow of lava that spread across a large part of central California.

== Water resources ==
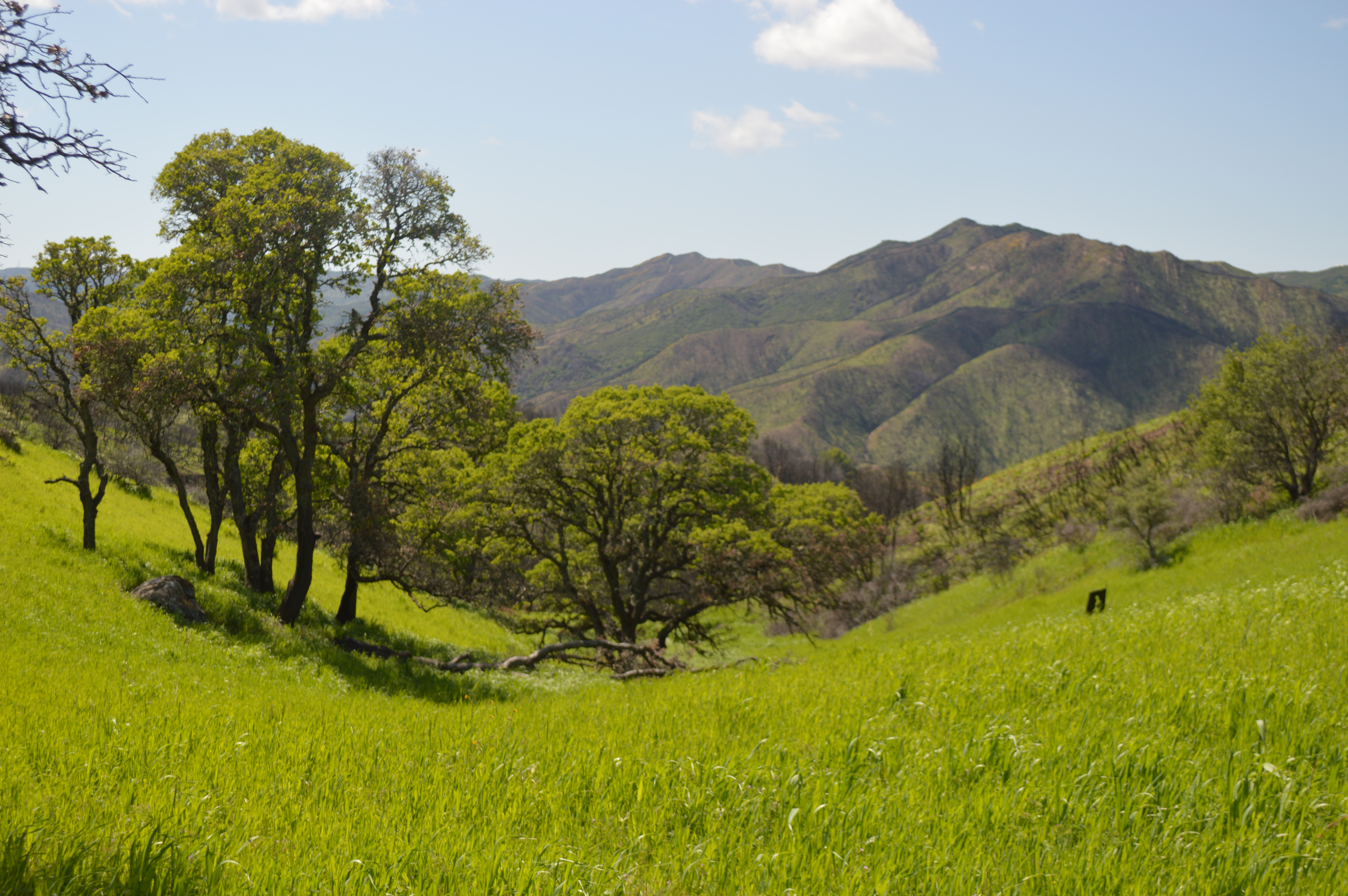
A view to the South in the Northern Vaca Mountains. The Canyon in the foreground holds Wildhorse Creek which is one of the few principal streams in this mountain range.

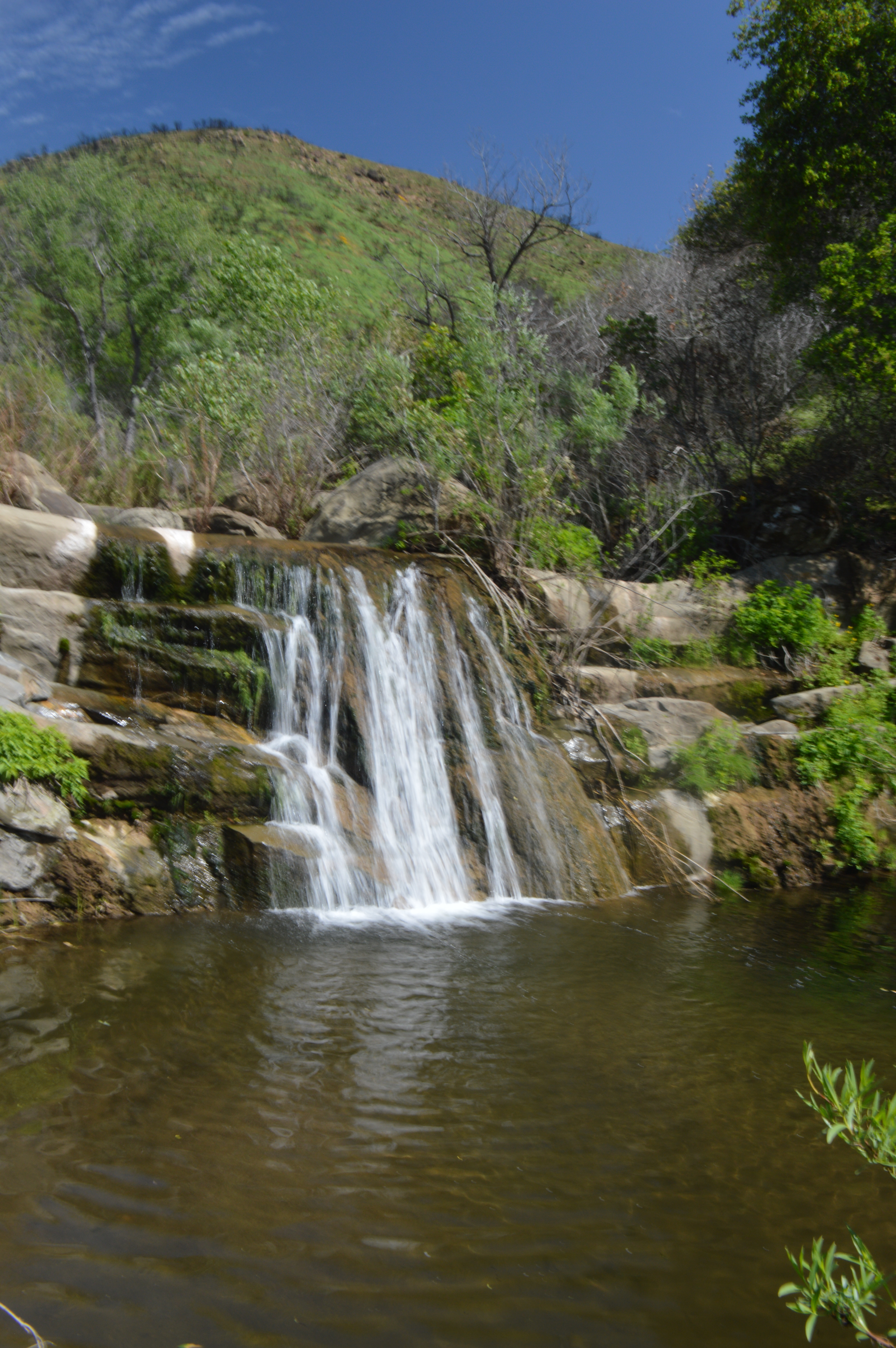
Wildhorse Creek (pictured above) eventually drains this section of the Vaca Mountains into Putah Creek below Monticello Dam.

The Vaca Mountains contain several perennial streams, the most important being Suisun Creek on the west side, and Putah Creek on the east. The city of Vallejo, California built a dam at the northern end of Suisun Creek in 1926 to create the 10,700 acre-feet (13,198,256 m^{3}) Lake Curry reservoir, which served as a municipal water supply until 1992 when measured selenium concentrations in the lake exceeded federal standards. The controversial Monticello Dam, Lake Berryessa reservoir, and Putah South Canal - an integrated project with more than 100 times the water storage capacity of Lake Curry - were completed in 1957-1958 on Putah Creek and currently provide irrigation water to many farms, vineyards and orchards.

== History ==
The original inhabitants of the Vaca Mountains were the Patwin people. The range is named for the Vaca family, after whom the city of Vacaville is also named. The Vacas, along with their partners the Pena family, were among the earliest European settlers in the area, being the original holders of the 1843 Rancho Los Putos land grant from Mexico of 44,385 acres (180 km^{2}) that includes most of the southern part of the range.

In August 2020, the Hennessey Fire started in the Vaca Mountains near Lake Hennessey. The fire burned over 315,000 acres (127,476 ha) in five counties.

== See also ==
- Mount Vaca
- Montezuma Hills
