= Stags Leap =

Stags Leap, Stag's Leap or Stags' Leap can refer to

- Stags Leap District AVA, viticultural area in Napa Valley, California
  - Stag's Leap Wine Cellars, wine producer in the Stags Leap District owned by Ste. Michelle/Antinori
  - Stags' Leap Winery, wine producer in the Stags Leap District owned by Beringer Estates
- Stag's Leap (book), 2012 book of poetry
