= Turley =

Turley is both a surname and a given name.

Notable people with the name include:

== Surname ==
- Anna Turley, British politician
- Bob Turley, American professional baseball player
- George Turley (1931–2010), English lawn bowler and (soccer) footballer
- Harry Turley (1859–1929), Australian politician
- Helen Turley, American winemaker
- Jim Turley, CEO of Ernst & Young
- Jonathan Turley, professor at George Washington University Law School
- Kyle Turley, American football player
- Larry Turley, owner and founder of Turley Wine Cellars
- Myra Turley, American film and television actress
- Neil Turley, British Rugby League player
- Nik Turley, American baseball player
- Thomas B. Turley (1845–1910), US Senator
- Vashti Turley Murphy (1884–1960), co-founder of Delta Sigma Theta

== Given name ==
- Turley Richards, American musician

== Other uses ==
- Turley, Missouri, American ghost town
- Turley, New Mexico, census-designated place
- Turley, Oklahoma, census-designated place
- Turley's Mill, Arroyo Hondo, Taos County, New Mexico, scene of the Taos Revolt of 1847

== See also ==
- Turnley, list of people with the surname
