= Silverado Trail =

- Length: 29 mi (47 km)
- Location: Napa County
- Southeast end: SR 121 at Soscol Road in Napa
- Major junctions: SR 121 at Trancas / Monticello; SR 128 in St. Helena
- Northwest end: SR 29 (Lincoln Ave.) in Calistoga

The Silverado Trail is a scenic route that travels 29 miles along the Eastern edge of the Napa Valley, parallel to and several miles to the east of California State Route 29.

== History ==
The road began as a trail built in 1852 after flooding made the main Napa Valley road impassable. Later, it served as a wagon trail to link cinnabar mines on Mount St. Helena to San Pablo Bay, the northern portion of the San Francisco Bay, and was the first permanent road from Napa to Calistoga.

Silver was discovered in Napa Valley in 1858, and wine production began in the 1870s, making the road an important trade route. Charles Bolles, a highway bandit also known as "Black Bart", preyed on the road's travelers in the 1880s. Safety improved when motorized bus service began in 1910. A Phylloxera plague and Prohibition forced most but not all of the local wineries out of business.

The area thrived with the growing prominence of California wine. One of the wineries on the road, Stag's Leap Wine Cellars, made Napa Valley world-famous in 1976 when it won the Judgment of Paris, a promotional wine competition among French and California wines. Today, at least 40 of the Valley's more than 200 wineries are along or near the road. Each year in March, the route also plays host to the annual Napa Valley Marathon.

== Major intersections ==
Location	Postmile	Intersection	Destinations	Notes
Napa		SR 121 at Soscol Road in		Southern terminus
		Coombsville Rd. / 3rd street		
		1st street	Copia, Ritz-Carlton Hotel (approved project)	
		SR 121 at Trancas St. / Monticello Ave.		
		Oak Knoll Ave.	Silverado Country Club, Clos Du Val Winery, Andretti Winery, Black Stallion Winery	
Yountville		Yountville Cross Rd.	Stag's Leap Wine Cellars, Stags' Leap Winery, Silverado Vineyards Winery	
Oakville		Oakville Cross Rd.		
St. Helena		SR 128		
		Zinfandel Lane		
		Pope St. / Howell Mountain Rd.		
		Deer Park Rd.	Duckhorn Vineyards	
Calistoga		SR 29 (Lincoln Ave.)		
