= Stags Leap District AVA =

American Viticultural Area in Napa County, California

Coordinates: 38°23′59″N 122°19′25″W

Stags Leap District
- Wine region
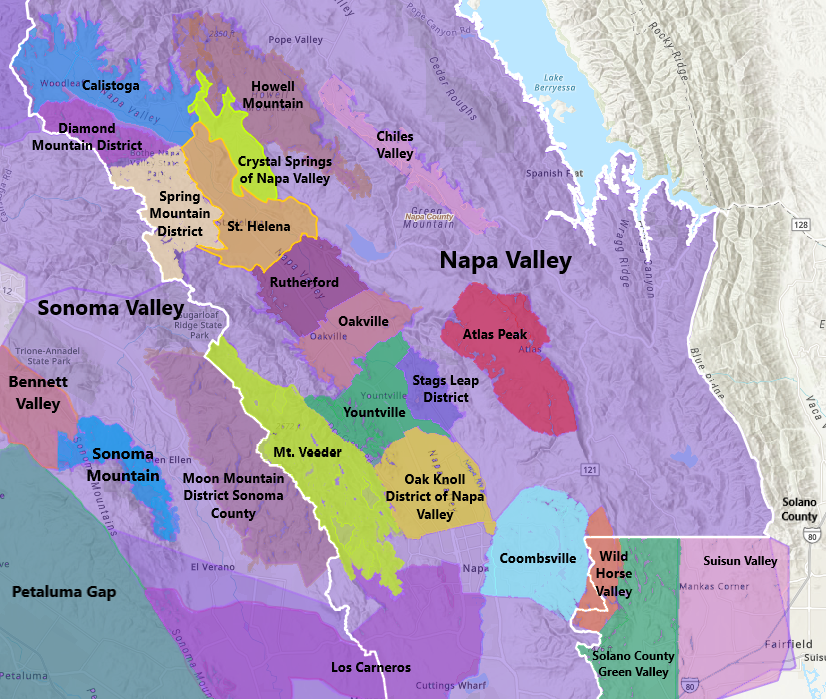
- Type: American Viticultural Area
- Year established: 1989
- Years of wine industry: 154
- Country: United States
- Part of: California, North Coast AVA, Napa County, Napa Valley AVA
- Other regions in California, North Coast AVA, Napa County, Napa Valley AVA: Atlas Peak AVA, Calistoga AVA, Chiles Valley AVA, Crystal Springs of Napa Valley AVA, Diamond Mountain District AVA, Howell Mountain AVA, Los Carneros AVA, Mt. Veeder AVA, Coombsville AVA, Oak Knoll District of Napa Valley AVA, Oakville AVA, Rutherford AVA, Spring Mountain District AVA, St. Helena AVA, Wild Horse Valley AVA, Yountville AVA
- Growing season: 249 days
- Climate region: Region IV
- Heat units: 3,640 GDD units
- Precipitation (annual average): 25 to 30 in (640–760 mm)
- Soil conditions: Volcanic parent material mixed with Cole silt and Bale clay loams
- Total area: 2,550 acres (4 sq mi)
- Size of planted vineyards: 1,250 acres (510 ha)
- No. of vineyards: 12
- Grapes produced: Cabernet Franc, Cabernet Sauvignon, Carignane, Chardonnay, Grenache, Malbec, Merlot, Mourvedre/Mataro, Peloursin, Petit Verdot, Sauvignon Blanc, Sauvignon Gris, Syrah/Shiraz, Zinfandel
- No. of wineries: 17
- Comments: As of 2026

Stags Leap District is an American Viticultural Area (AVA) located in Napa County, California, directly east of the town of Yountville and approximately seven miles (11.3 km) north of the county seat of Napa. It was established as the nation's 104^{th}, the state's 59^{th} and the county’s sixth appellation on January 26, 1989 by the Bureau of Alcohol, Tobacco and Firearms (ATF), Treasury after reviewing two petitions received since 1985 from the Stags Leap Appellation Committee, hereinafter referred to as Group A, proposing a viticultural area in Napa Valley, California, to be known as "Stags Leap District."

In the 1976 Judgment of Paris wine tasting, Stag's Leap Wine Cellars' 1973 Cabernet vintage, grown and processed in the locale later designated as an AVA, ranked first in the red wine category besting wines from top-rated Bordeaux estates, immediately recognizing California, specially Napa Valley, as a primer international viticulture region.
According to the ruling, the Bureau concluded that the soil (including the topsoil) is the primary geographical feature that distinguishes Stags Leap District from the surrounding areas. The Bale soil series predominates the region with clay loam sediments from the Napa River and volcanic soil deposits left over from erosion of the Vaca Mountains. Stags Leap District is a small area, only about one by three miles (1.6 by 4.8 km), was the third sub-appellation within the renown Napa Valley particularly noted for its Cabernet Sauvignon and Petite Sirah. As of 2025, Stags Leap District is resident to approximately twelve vineyards and seventeen wineries.

== Amendments ==
At the outset, the area proposed by Group A consisted of approximately 2,200 acres (3.4 sq mi) including approximately 1,100 acres (445 ha) of vineyards, situated east of the city of Yountville and north of the City of Napa. The proposed area is surrounded by hills to the north, east, and west, and was configured like a funnel. Group A submitted an amendment to its petition, dated December 18, 1985 (hereinafter referred to as the First Amendment) and requested, among other things, that the name of the proposed viticultural area be changed from "Stags Leap" to "Stags Leap District." During the proposal process, on June 26, 1986, Group A submitted a second amendment and supplement to its original petition (hereinafter referred to as the Second Amendment). The Second Amendment requested a revision of the northern and western boundaries of the proposed Stags Leap District. Attached to the Second Amendment was a research document prepared by Silverado Vineyards, in support of Group A's contention that the Napa River, rather than the peaks of then hills west of the Silverado Trail, was the appropriate western boundary for the proposed viticultural area, and the ring of hills to the north was a more appropriate northern boundary. The revision of the northern and western boundaries added approximately 350 acres (142 ha) to the proposed viticultural area, for a total size of approximately 2,550 acres (1,032 ha). Included within the extended boundaries were previously excluded vineyards owned by, among others, Silverado Vineyards and Mondavi Winery.
ATF received two comments in response to the notice of proposed rulemaking. One comment in particular, dated April 10, 1987. was submitted by Mr. Stanley Anderson of S. Anderson Vineyard. Mr. Anderson, who owns a winery and vineyards located just north of the proposed northern boundary, requested that the northern boundary be extended approximately 500 yards (457 m). He suggested that the Yountville Cross Road would be a more appropriate boundary than the peaks of hills as proposed in Notice No. 620. The proposed revision would add 150 acres (61 ha) to the proposed Stags Leap District, for a total size of approximately 2,700 acres (4.2 sq mi). With the exception of the northern boundary, Mr. Anderson supported the other boundaries as proposed in the notice. Attached to Mr. Anderson's comment were letters from several neighboring vineyard owners who are also located in the proposed "northern extension," all of whom supported the extension of the northern boundary to the Yountville Cross Road. Mr. Anderson, and those of his neighbors who supported the northern extension, will hereinafter be referred to as Group B.
Although recognizing that there is evidence which would support both Group A and Group B in this matter, ATF found that the greater weight of evidence supported the Group B proposal. ATF found that the general area encompassed within the boundaries proposed by Group B is locally referred to as "Stags Leap District." In ATF's view, Group B adequately demonstrated that their proposed area reflects the current definition of Stags Leap District.

== History ==
The origin of the name "Stags Leap" is not well documented. Most common oral histories attribute it to a native Wappo legend of a stag leaping to escape hunters as another version refers to a large, majestic stag that eluded a generation of hunters, always leaping and escaping at the last moment. Grapes were planted in 1872, by Terrill L. Grigsby, on the family's 700-acre (1.1 sq mi) parcel where the current Stag's Leap estate resides. He built Occidental Winery, the area's first, in 1878. Nathan Fay planted the first Cabernet Sauvignon in 1961, on land that would later be purchased by Warren Winiarski for Stag's Leap Wine Cellars. Pioneering vinters, Richard Steltzner and Bernard Portet, settled in Stags Leap in 1964 and '68, respectively, establishing vineyards in the ideal terroir with its temperature, constant breezes and ideal volcanic soil to achieve fruit with a concentrated color and intense flavor. At the relatively unknown Paris Wine Tasting of 1976, celebrating the United States Bicentennial, Stag's Leap Wine Cellars' 1973 Cabernet vintage, grown and processed in the locale later given AVA status, ranked first in the red wine category besting wines from top-rated Bordeaux estates, and suddenly elevating California, especially Napa Valley, as a primer viticulture region. In 1972, John Shafer left Chicago's publishing world to become a farmer in Stags Leap. He grew walnut trees and grapes, terracing the steep, rocky hillsides. He released his first vintage in 1981, a 100 percent Cabernet that teased the palate, suggesting a Merlot blend. This flavor profile, the hallmark of Cabs from Stags Leap, further advocating for its unique Napa Valley sub-appellation.

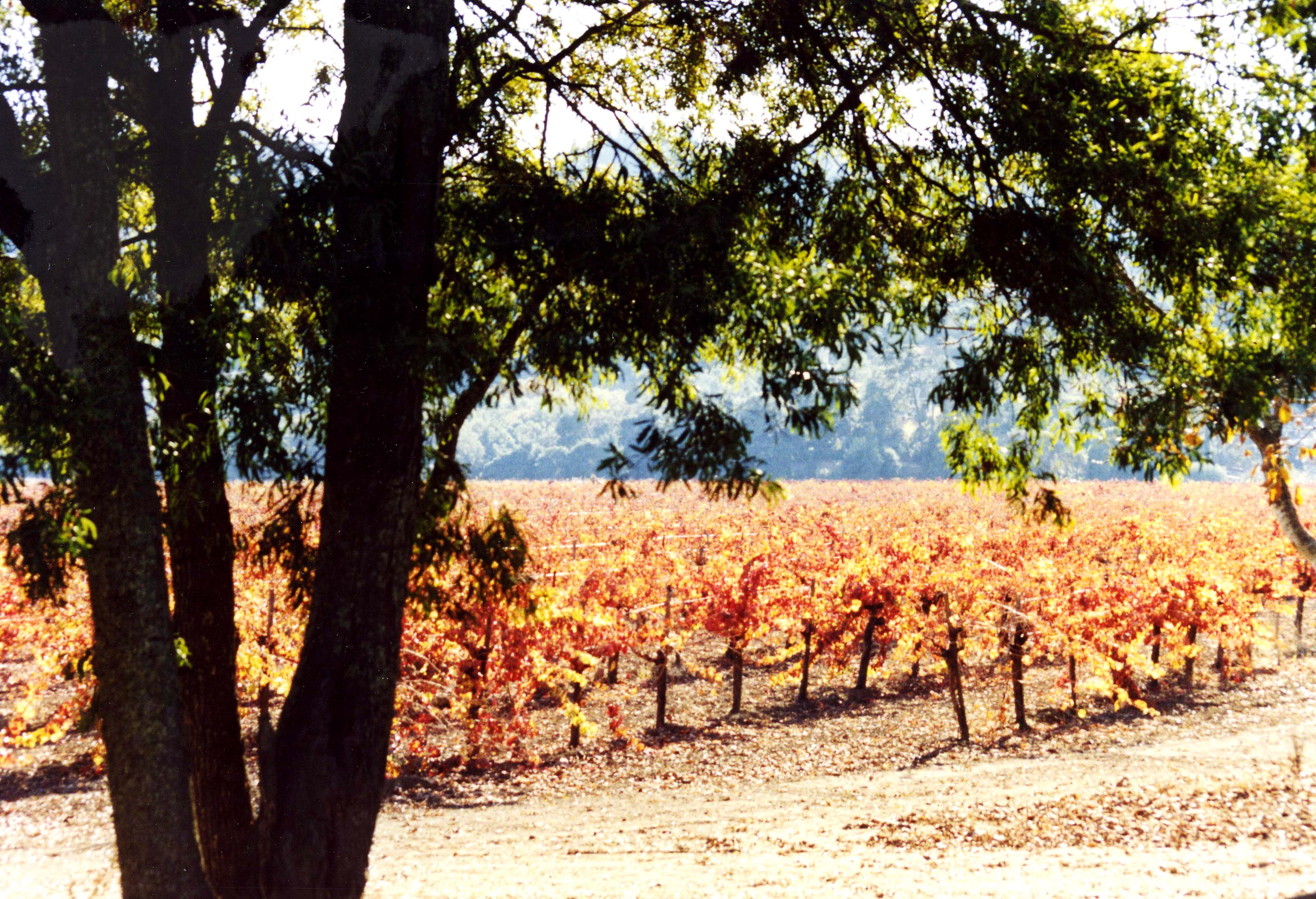
Stags Leap vineyard

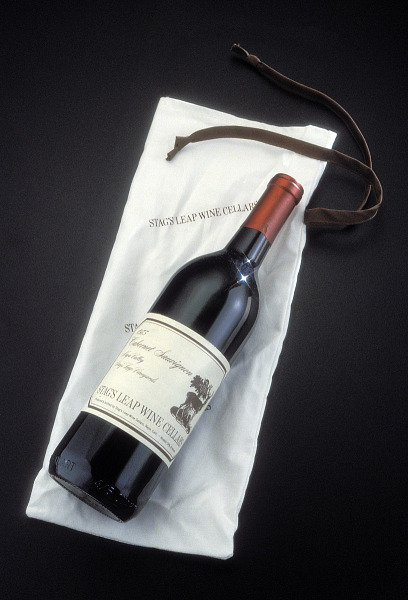
1976 Judgment of Paris '73 Cabernet vintage

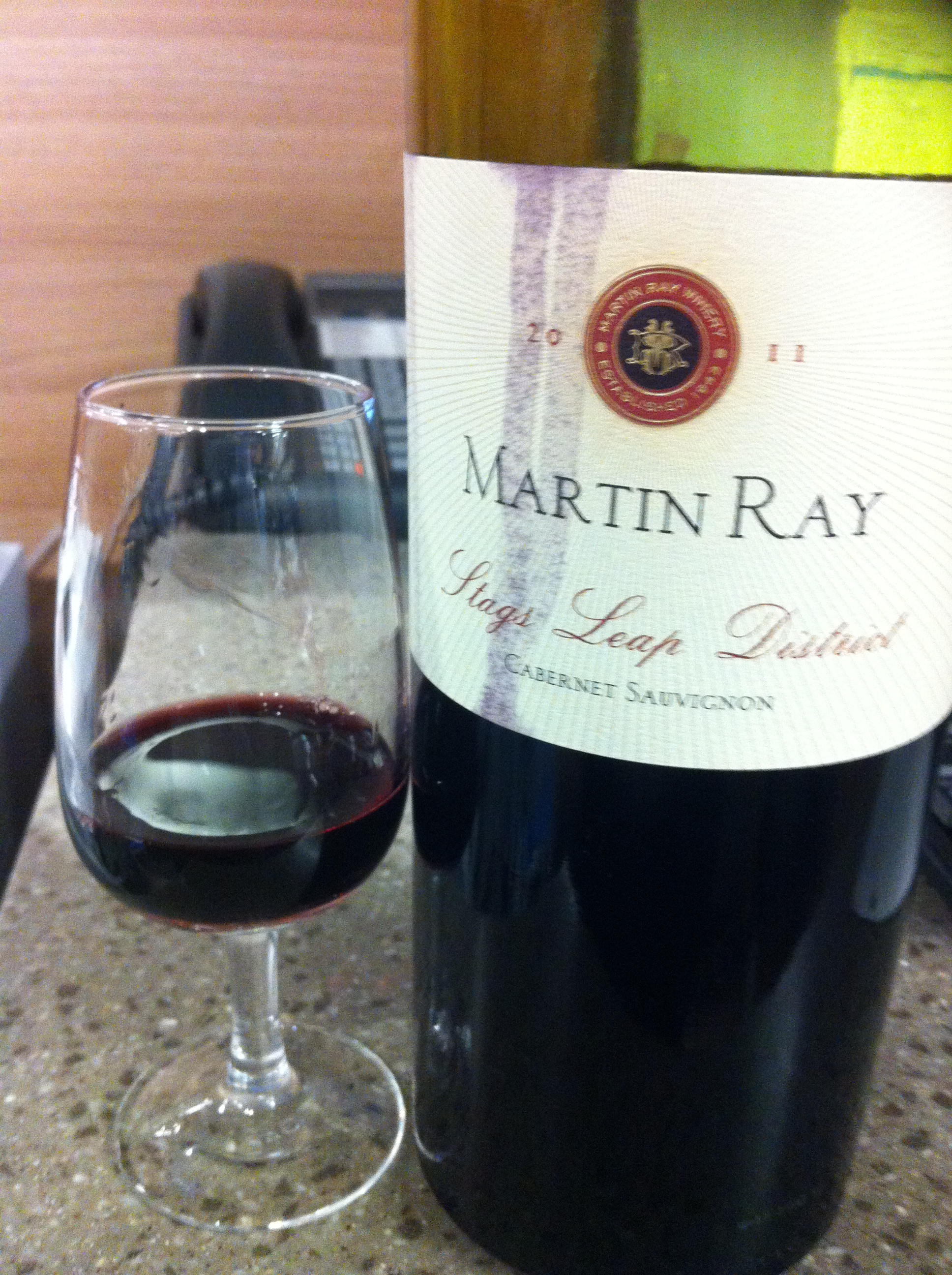
Stag's Leap Cabernet Sauvignon

== Terroir ==
=== Topography ===
In their initial petition, Group A submitted evidence that the proposed Stags Leap (District) viticultural area had a distinct microclimate, resulting from the orographic configuration of the area. Often referred to as a "valley within a valley," the area is surrounded on three sides by hills or mountains configured like a funnel that accentuated the inflow of cool air from San Pablo Bay, which is located south of the proposed area. As stated in the weather report of Irving P. Krick Associates, Inc.(Petition. p. 38-39):

The wide end of the funnel faces south to receive the bay breeze and the frequent fogs and low clouds which accompany it. These breezes are then guided into the area by its unique topography, including the mountains to the east of the Silverado Trail and the series of contiguous hills to the west of the Trail, which serve as the two sides of the funnel.

The Krick report goes on to state that the topography of the area also controls the movement of air out of the area, "[slpecifically, the air exits to the mountain elevations to the north or, * * * to the main valley floor through the narrow passes at the north of Stags Leap." (Petition, p. 39). However, with the subsequent extension of the western boundary from the hills west of the Silverado Trail to the Napa River (Second Amendment), as proposed in Notice No. 620, ATF does not believe that the topography of the viticultural area is a significant geographical feature in determining a western boundary. As meteorologist Donald Schukraft (Weather Network, Inc.) stated at the public hearing in discussing the extended (western) area, "[t/here is no funnel effect here. This area is open to the Valley." (Tr. Vol. I, p. 125). Similarly, ATF does not believe that topography is a significant geographic feature in determining the northern boundary of the Stags Leap District viticultural area. Although the petitioners had noted that the northern ring of hills, just south of the Yountville Cross Road, defined part of the "funnel," no evidence was submitted in the rulemaking proceeding which conclusively demonstrated a difference between the area north and south of the hills.

=== Climate ===
In their Second Amendment, Group A included a weather study of the proposed viticultural area (as specified in Notice No. 620), prepared by Weather Network, Inc. Weather data was obtained from thermographs and automatic weather stations located both inside and outside (e.g., approximately 1/2 mile (1 km) west of) the proposed viticultural area. As noted in the report (Second Amendment, p. 34):

* * * the daily maximum and minimum temperatures recorded by the stations in Stags Leap District were generally several degrees higher than those recorded by the weather station to the west of the Napa River and near the center of the Valley floor. On some days the differences between the two stations were over ten degrees.

However, Weather Network. Inc. did not set up a weather station in the proposed northern extension area. Consequently, there is no data available from that area. Moreover, the petitioners had conceded that actual maximum temperature values were not significantly different from those in nearby areas. (Petition, p. 40). In the aforementioned Krick report, it was stated that the funnel effect did not cause degree day values as currently calculated to vary appreciably between the Stags Leap area and the adjacent Napa Valley areas, and "for this reason it would be misleading to use only degree-days as a criteria for evaluating the microclimate of the various vineyards within short distances of Stags Leap." (Petition, p. 40). At the public hearing, Mr. Donald Schukraft, a certified consulting meteorologist, commented that the hills along the northern boundary of the proposed Stags Leap area "provide changes in the wind-flow pattern that consequently produce changes in the temperatures and humidity in the vineyards to the north and south of the hills. These changes * * * are not found at the Yountville Cross Road." (Tr. Vol. I, p. 118). For example, Mr. Sclhukraft asserted that on a day when the wind-flow is from the south, the air would flow around the northern hills (south of the Yountville Cross Road) and exit the area south of the northern hills, resulting in temperatures that are lower and humidity that is higher than the area north of the hills. However, Mr. Schukraft presented no climatological data to support those conclusions ATF received conflicting reports from vineyard owners both within the proposed area and within the northern extension as to the effects of the wind on their respective grape vines. Mr. Richard Chambers, who owns a vineyard in the northern extension, stated at the public hearing that the area in the northern extension (south of the Yountville Cross Road) also receives the breezes from the San Pablo Bay. (Tr. Vol. III, p. 25). To support this contention, he provided photographs of his vineyard and other vineyards in the northern extension, S. Anderson Vineyard and Missimer Vineyard, which depicted grape vines bent over, growing toward the north, away from the south wind. On the other hand, in the area around Yountville (west of the Napa River), Mr. Chambers noted only neutral vine growth. (Hearing Exhibit 27). As to how far north the strong wind extended, Mr. Chambers stated that "it undoubtedly crosses the Yountville Cross Road," before dissipating in the area further up State Lane. (Tr. Vol. III, p. 26). However, Group A submitted evidence to the contrary. In their post-hearing brief (Hearing Comment 84, Exhibit P), Mr. John Stuart of Silverado Vineyards stated that in Silverado's vineyards in Yountville, cane growth is also oriented toward the north, with subsequent wind damage. Mr. Robert Egan submitted a post-hearing comment (Hearing Comment 85) which included photographs of Mr. Chambers' vineyard and Mr. Anderson's vineyard indicating that the wind had little or no effect on the vines or canes in either vineyard. Mr. Egan provided photographs of his own vineyard, located just south of the northern hills, and suggested that the vines tended to lean to the north as a result of the wind. ATF finds that the evidence presented as to the effect of the wind within the proposed viticultural area is too inconclusive to support a finding that the northern hills provide a significant barrier to the winds from the south, with resulting differences in temperature. ATF notes that the evidence presented at the hearing indicated that there was no "funnel effect" from the area west of the hills west of the Silverado Trail to the Napa River. ATF does not believe that the "funnel effect" represents a significant geographical feature of the entire viticultural area as proposed by Group A. Therefore, ATF does not believe that climate, with regard to temperature, is a significant distinguishing geographical feature in determining the boundaries of the Stags Leap District viticultural area.
Based on data presented in the USDA SCS Soil Survey of Napa County, California(August 1978), average annual precipitation within the Stags Leap District is 25 to 30 inches (635–762 mm). Similar amounts of rainfall can be expected in the areas west and south of the viticultural area, while average rainfall north and east of the viticultural area increases to between 30 to 35 inches (762–889 mm). ATF notes that there is no conclusive evidence that the area between the Yountville Cross Road and the northern hills has different precipitation patterns from the proposed viticultural area. Professor Elliott-Fisk, an expert witness for Group A, concluded that the types of plants and density of forests and woodlands on the ridges and hills of the proposed Stags Leap District indicate the entrapment of moist, marine air within the area. She also stated that with the exception of the oak-madrone woodland, other types of woodlands found within the proposed Stags Leap District, such as the oak forest, madrone forest, and conifer-hardwood forest, do not continue to the north and south of the proposed district. (Hearing Comment 84, Exhibit M. p. 2). This evidence was disputed by Mrs. Dorothy Barboza, a vineyard owner in the northern extension, who sent photographs of conifer trees in the northern extension. (Post Hearing Comment Period 3). The Bureau has determined that there is insufficient evidence on this issue to support a finding that the types of vegetation in the northern extension differ significantly from the types of vegetation found in the Stags Leap District. The plant hardiness zone ranges from 9a to 9b.

=== Soils ===
ATF concluded that the soil (including the subsoil) is the primary geographical feature that distinguishes Stags Leap District from the surrounding areas. According to the SCS soil survey, there are 31 soil series within Napa County. Approximately 45% of these soil series are present within the Stags Leap District, as adopted by the Treasury decision. Certain of these soil series, such as Millsholm, Perkins, and Kidd, are found within the viticultural area but not in the surrounding areas. However, within the Stags Leap District area, the Bale soil series predominates. Bale soil are also found to the north of the viticultural area, but not in the surrounding areas to the east, south, or west. The SCS describes Bale soils as being somewhat poorly drained on alluvial fans, flood plains, and low terraces. As described in the soil survey, they are formed in alluvium derived from rhyolite and basic igneous rock. In the following paragraphs, the Bureau will discuss the reasons why it concluded that the soils of the Stags Leap District form the best geographical basis for distinguishing the District from the areas which surround it.
The Stags Leap mountain range is located just east of the Stags Leap District. Consequently, this area consists mainly of rock outcrop and, to a lesser degree, the Hambright soil series. The SCS soil survey notes that these types of soils are not used for growing wine grapes, either because they are not suitable or there is no water available for irrigation. The dominant soils south of the viticultural area include the Hambright series, the Haire series, the Yolo series, and the Cole series. These four soil series converge just south of the viticultural area and, in effect, "pinch" it off. In addition, in its post-hearing comment, Group A noted that there is a confluence of three drainage systems just south of the viticultural area-the Napa River, Dry Creek, and Hopper Creek. (Hearing Comment 84, Exhibit U).
In Group A's initial petition, they submitted a report on soils from viticultural consultant Richard Nagoaka. Mr. Nagoaka stated that the dominant soils west of the Napa River include the Yolo series, the Cole series, and the Clear Lake Series. (Petition, p. 48). Mr. Nagoaka also stated that:

The soils to the east of the (Napa) river (the Stags Leap side) were deposited by alluvial forces from parent materials from the Vaca Range on the eastern rim of the Napa Valley. By contrast, the soils to the west of the Napa River were deposited from parent materials from the Mayacamus Range on the western rim of the valley. These two ranges not only appear different, but are composed of profoundly different materials. (Petition, p. 45).

According to Mr. Nagoaka, the Vaca mountain range was formed about ten million years ago through volcanic activity. In contrast, the Mayacamus mountain range formed about 30 million years ago, and is composed of fines and sedimentary materials. Thus, as Mr. Nagoaka pointed out, soils west of the Napa River "tend to be deeper, more fertile and of greater water-holding capacity" than those east of the Napa River. (Petition, p. 46). Because of the greater water-holding capacity, soils west of the Napa River do not require late irrigation. Mr. Nagoaka compared the water-holding capacity of the Cole silt loam soils (west of the Napa River) with the Bale clay loam soils east of the Napa River. He found that the Bale soils contained 0.06–0.11 in (2–3 mm) of available water per inch of soil, while the Cole soils contained 0.16–0.21 in (4–5 mm) of water per inch of soil, approximately double the water-holding capacity. Mr. Nagoaka concluded that "[v]iticulturally, the management of vineyards west and east of the river is profoundly influenced by the different soil types and their characteristics." (Petition. p. 50).

== Winery Association ==
One of the leading influences in the region is the Stags Leap District Winery Association which promotes the viticultural area wines and hosts an annual day-long event called "Vineyard to Vintner" giving consumers the opportunity to interact with local wineries and wine tastings. The following wineries are members:

- Baldacci Family Vineyards
- Chimney Rock Winery
- Cliff Lede Vineyards
- Clos Du Val
- Ilsley Vineyards
- Lewis Cellars
- Malk Family Vineyards
- Missimer
- Pine Ridge Vineyards
- Quixote Winery
- Regusci Winery
- Shafer Vineyards
- Silverado Vineyards
- Stag's Leap Wine Cellars
- Stags' Leap Winery
- Steltzner Vineyards
- Taylor Family Vineyards
