= Quixote Winery =

Boutique winery in Napa Valley, California

- Location: Napa, California, USA
- Appellation: Stags Leap District AVA
- Founded: 1996
- First vintage: 1999
- Key people: Carl Doumani, Founder and Former Proprietor; Philippe Melka; Consulting Winemaker, Robert Smith; Winemaker
- Cases/yr: 2,500
- Known for: Quixote Petite Sirah
- Varietals: Petite Sirah, Cabernet Sauvignon
- Tasting: Daily by appointment. Estate Tasting -$80 per person / Estate Tour & Tasting - $100 per person / Food & Wine Experience - $150 per person
- Website: http://www.quixotewinery.com

Quixote Winery is a boutique winery in the Stags Leap District of Napa Valley, California. The winery produces organic red wine in the premium segment, and also features unusual, eclectic architecture and label design.

== Production and facilities ==
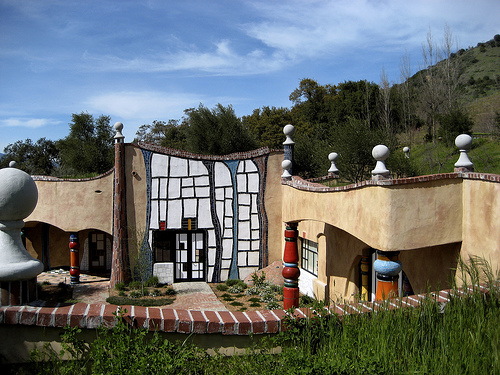

Quixote Winery produces Petite Sirah (Quixote spells it as Petite Syrah) and Cabernet Sauvignon varietal wines, under the "Quixote" label. Fruit is sourced from the 27 acres (11 ha), sustainably-farmed Stags’ Leap District estate vineyard that was planted in 1996 located between Stags' Leap Winery and Shafer Vineyards. The wine, which retails between $85 and $225 per bottle ($40 for Rose), are highly rated and have received numerous awards. Food and Wine Magazine rated Quixote one of the twenty best new wineries in the world between 1999 and 2004.

The winery building, including grounds, is the only United States project built by Viennese architect Friedensreich Hundertwasser (1928–2000). Among other unusual touches, the winery is designed in a whimsical, exotic way with ceramic tiles, irregularly rounded and painted columns, and deliberately uneven floors designed for their tactile effect on occupants' feet. There are no right angles, except in the basement. The design style has been called phantasmagoric, psychedelic, and Dr. Seuss-like, and also likened to "the creation of a beautifully demented child". The winery structure is dominated by an onion dome covered in gold leaf, as well as a living roof topped with grass, bushes, and trees.

== History ==
2002 Petite Syrah label design

In 1971, Carl Doumani purchased the historic Stags' Leap Winery. Over two decades he restored the vineyard, winery, and manor house. In 1988, Doumani decided to create a smaller organic and sustainable winery highlighting his much adored varietal, Petite Sirah. He formed a friendship with renowned Austrian artist and architect Friedensreich Hundertwasser, with whom he worked to design the winery, after growing impatient with his intended project architect and noticing Hundertwasser's sculptures in a calendar. Partly due to the unusual design process and construction methods, the winery took ten years to complete. Hundertwasser also designed some of the winery's unusual wine labels, and persuaded Doumani to produce the wine with organically farmed grapes. Hundertwasser and Doumani agreed on a design approach that would emphasize that structures, and the people in them, need not be on "the grid", and could instead be close to nature.

Winemaker for Quixote Winery has been under the direction of Robert Smith since 2011 with Philippe Melka as consulting winemaker since 2018.

Wine Spectator reported in July 2014 that Quixote Winery had been sold to a Chinese company for approximately $29 million.
