= Heitz Wine Cellars =

Winery in California, United States

Coordinates: 38.501497°N 122.417865°W

Heitz Cellar
- Location: St. Helena, California, USA
- Appellation: Napa Valley AVA
- Founded: 1961
- Key people: Joe and Alice Heitz, founders Brittany Sherwood, winemaker
- Parent company: Lawrence Group
- Known for: Martha's Vineyard Cabernet; Bella Oaks Vineyard Cabernet; Trailside Vineyard Cabernet
- Varietals: Cabernet Sauvignon, Chardonnay, Sauvignon blanc, Grignolino, Zinfandel
- Other products: Rosé, Fortified wine
- Distribution: national
- Tasting: open to the public
- Website: www.heitzcellar.com

Heitz Cellar is an American California wine producer located within Napa Valley east of the town of St. Helena. An early modern era Napa Valley presence and pioneering exponent of French oak, the estate enjoys a historical renown with the success of its Martha's Vineyard Cabernet Sauvignon, and has also been described as a "master of Grignolino".

== History ==
The estate was established in 1961 by Joseph (Joe) and Alice Heitz, during a period when the population of Napa Valley wineries had been reduced to the lowest number since the Prohibition, with about two dozen wineries, at what is recognized as the turning point of Napa's wine industry.

=== Joe Heitz ===
Born in Princeton, Illinois, Heitz grew up on a farm and came to California in the 1940s while serving in the Army Air Corps. For most of World War II, he served as a mechanic at an Air Corps base near Fresno. At night and on weekends, he worked various odd jobs which led to work at an Italian Swiss Colony winery setting him on his career path. After the war ended, Heitz began taking classes at UC Davis, achieving bachelor and master's degrees in viticulture and enology as the first seven graduates in this major in 1951. Heitz found employment under the wine industry extremes, first at Gallo, and then under André Tchelistcheff at Beaulieu Vineyard as an assistant winemaker where he worked for near ten years.

In 1958, he worked as a professor at the Research Center for Viticulture and Enology program at California State University, Fresno for four years. In 1961, Heitz and his wife Alice bought a small 8.5-acre (3.4 ha) vineyard just south of St. Helena from Leon Brendel named "The One & Only" for $5,000, planted with grignolino, and went into business for himself where his winemaking production preceded Robert Mondavi's emergence in Oakville.

In 1963 Heitz bought at an auction several barrels of Chardonnay and Pinot noir wine from Hanzell Vineyards in Sonoma, the last vintages of the deceased owner James D. Zellerbach's pursuit of Burgundian excellence sold off by his widow. Heitz blended the wines with success, achieving lucrative prices for the times. A stated strategy for success was to pay growers "what their grapes were worth", in turn increasing the standard of the product he was receiving. In 1964, Heitz acquired an 1898 stone winery with its 160-acre (65 ha) ranch property, which became the Heitz winery and home, with the original winery retained as a visitor's centre.

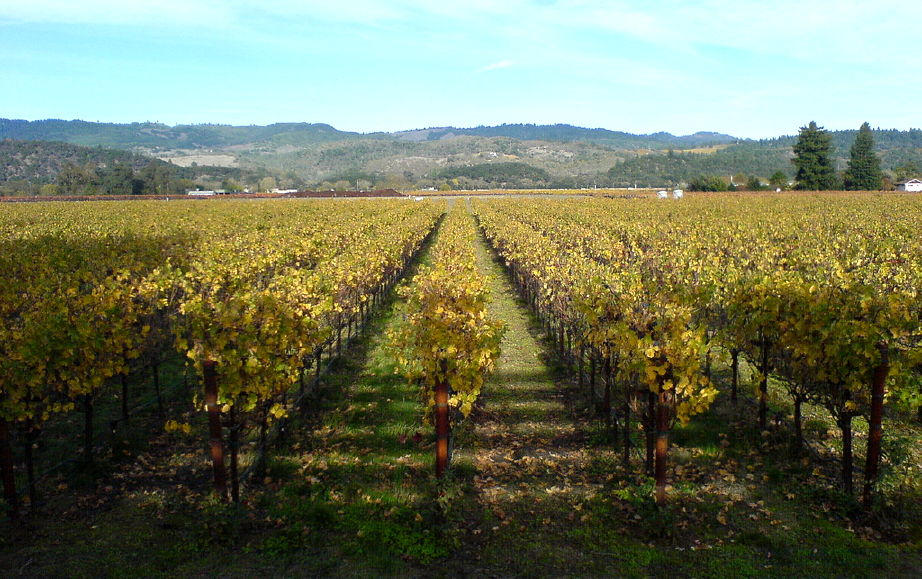
Heitz Wine Cellars vineyards in Napa Valley

Heitz holds an exclusive agreement with Tom and Martha May, owners of the 34-acre (14 ha) Martha's Vineyard in the Oakville AVA since the first purchase of fruit in 1965 which Heitz blended with other Cabernet, an act considered Heitz' great breakthrough. In recognizing the quality of the grapes, from the 1966 vintage Heitz first vinified the fruit separately and designated the vineyard on the label. Heitz is considered the first to champion the single vineyard designation in the U.S. Later, the 1968 vintage received attention for its quality, widely considered the greatest wine made in America up to that time. It had been 1,000-US-gallon (38 hL) American oak vats, transferred to Limousin barrels where it aged for further two years. Frank J. Prial contended the wine remained "the benchmark by which California cabernets were judged" for more than two decades.

Since 1976, a similar exclusivity agreement has existed with Barney and Belle Rhodes, owners of the 18-acre (7.3 ha) Bella Oaks Vineyard in the Rutherford AVA.

Following a review by Robert Parker where he wrote about Martha's Vineyard Cabernet Sauvignon that it "lacked aroma", Joe Heitz sent Parker a box of linen handkerchiefs, insinuating to the critic that he ought to clear his nose.

Joe Heitz suffered a stroke in 1996 which left him frail though lucid. He died on December 16, 2000, aged 81. He was described by Warren Winiarski as the first of the Napa Valley artisans and the first to grasp the single vineyard concept.

=== Modern era ===
Born in 1950, David Heitz succeeded his father as winemaker in the late 1970s, having worked at the estate for many years. In 1984 the estate purchased the Trailside Vineyard in Rutherford, having previously purchased fruit from the site, introduced as a single vineyard bottling in 1989.

During the late 1980s and early 90s there were reports of TCA taint, or in alternate claims Brettanomyces yeast infection, in the Heitz cellars that were eventually overcome, and Tom Stevenson has criticized American wine writers for not daring to "tell the late king he had no clothes on at the time".

In the early 90s, the Bella Oaks Vineyard suffered from the disease eutypa and replanting became necessary. No 1991 and 1992 vintages were made of this cuvée. Also in the early 90s, phylloxera afflicted Martha's Vineyard, and no vintages were made in the mid-1990s.

In 2018, Heitz was acquired by Gaylon Lawrence, Jr.

Brittany Sherwood is the winemaker at Heitz and has been there since 2012.

== Competitions ==
The 1970 Heitz Cellar Martha's Vineyard Cabernet Sauvignon appeared in several wine tasting competitions, including the "Judgment of Paris" tasting, where it placed ninth out of the ten red wines, and its subsequent 'rematches'. In the San Francisco Wine Tasting of 1978 it placed second out of seven wines, in the French Culinary Institute Wine Tasting of 1986 it placed seventh out of nine wines, in the Wine Spectator Wine Tasting of 1986 it placed first out of ten wines, and in the 2006 "Judgment of Paris" 30th Anniversary tasting it tied for a third place out of ten wines.

== Production ==
The estate amasses 375 acres (152 ha) of vineyards, in addition to its purchase agreements, Vines are cultivated by organic principles per certification. Heitz Cellar annually produces approximately 40,000 cases (3,600 hL) of wine.

Heitz works with a number of grape varieties grown in several American Viticultural Areas including Oakville, Rutherford, St. Helena and the greater Napa Valley. In addition to several vineyard designated Cabernet Sauvignon that are often aged in oak for three and half years, Heitz also produces varietal labeled wines from Chardonnay, Sauvignon blanc, Grignolino and Zinfandel. Other wines include a dry rosé made from Grignolino and fortified "port-style" wine from Portuguese grape varieties like Touriga Nacional, Tinta Roriz, Souzão, Tinta Cao, Tinta Bairrada, Tinta Madeira, Tinta Amarela and Bastardo.
