= Frog's Leap Winery =

Frog's Leap
- Location: Rutherford, California, USA
- Coordinates: 38.4737°N 122.401°W
- Appellation: Rutherford AVA
- Founded: 1981
- First vintage: 1981
- Key people: John Williams, owner & winemaker
- Cases/yr: 60,000
- Known for: Sauvignon Blanc; Cabernet Sauvignon
- Varietals: Sauvignon blanc, Chardonnay, Zinfandel, Petite Sirah, Merlot, Cabernet Sauvignon, Cabernet Franc, Valdiguié, Riesling
- Distribution: national
- Tasting: by appointment
- Website: www.frogsleap.com

Frog's Leap Winery is a California wine producer that operates from Rutherford. It was founded in 1981 on a spot along Mills Creek known as Frog Farm. Frog's Leap Winery was established by John Williams and Larry Turley.

In addition to their accolades for their wines, Frog's Leap is also noted for its humorous approach to winemaking, down to their "Ribbit" corks. The winery got its name by combining "Frog Farm" (where its first wines were made) with "Stag's Leap" (where John Williams had his first winemaking job).

== History ==
John Williams and Larry Turley formed Frog's Leap in 1981 at the site of the historic Adamson Winery, producing 700 cases of sauvignon blanc. When they started, Turley was a doctor and Williams was a winemaker at Spring Mountain Vineyard. They took the winery into organic farming, and made it the first Napa winery to produce wine with certified organically grown grapes. They built up the winery in Saint Helena, California together until 1994, when John Williams took Frog's Leap to the Red Barn Ranch in Rutherford, California and Larry Turley established what is now Turley Wine Cellars. In 2004, Sunlight Electric met with Frog's Leap discussing how the winery was spending around $50,000 annually on electricity. On February 9, 2005, the photovolatic system went live over Frog's Leap's leeching fields. With the system's annual output of 260,000 kilowatt-hours (9.4×10^{11} J), it produces about 85% of the site's energy usage.

== Winemaking ==
Frog's Leap features organically grown grapes and dry-farmed vineyards. Owner John Williams believes dry-farming results in stronger, healthier vines.

Frog's Leap engages in other green practices as well. They were one of the first wineries to use solar power to run their entire operation. The winery also includes the use of compost and cover crops to organically enrich the soil, as well as dry farming to conserve water and reduce soil erosion.

== Wines ==
Frog's Leap used to make a wine known as "Leapfrögmilch" (a pun on Liebfraumilch), but after an incidence of noble rot in 2006, they replaced it with "Frögbeerenauslese" (a pun on Trockenbeerenauslese).
