= Turnley =

Turnley may refer to:

- David C. Turnley (born 1955), American photographer
- Dean Turnley (c. 2020s), Australian DJ, record producer and songwriter
- John Turnley (1935—1980), Northern Irish Protestant nationalist politician and activist
- Josh Turnley (born 1993), American association footballer
- Muriel Window (1892—1965; born Muriel Inetta Window Turnley), American actress, singer, vaudeville performer, Ziegfeld Girl, and businesswoman
- Peter Turnley (born 1955), American photographer and photojournalist
- Una Ellis-Fermor (1894—1958), English literary critic, author and Hildred Carlile Professor of English known by the pseudonym Christopher Turnley

== Other uses ==
- Bamford v Turnley (1860), important English tort law case concerning nuisance and what it means to be a reasonable user of land

== See also ==
- Turley, list of people with the surname
