= John Williams (winemaker) =

American winemaker

John Williams (born c. 1952) is an American winemaker and the owner and winemaker at Frog's Leap Winery in Rutherford, California. He is a champion of dry farming and an early pioneer of organic grape growing in the Napa Valley.

Williams grew up on his family's dairy farm in Clymer, New York. He graduated from Cornell University and moved to Napa Valley, California in 1975 to study winemaking at UC Davis. He worked at Stag's Leap Wine Cellars and Spring Mountain Vineyard before founding Frog's Leap Winery with Larry Turley in 1981.
