= Bob Sessions =

American winemaker

- Born: Robert B. Sessions; December 11, 1931; Glendale, California, United States
- Died: May 13, 2014 (aged 82); Sonoma, California, United States
- Occupation: Winemaker
- Years active: 1973-2001
- Known for: Winemaker at Hanzell Vineyards
- Spouses: Molly Cross (m. 1959; died 2000) Jean Arnold (m. 2002–2014)

Bob Sessions (December 11, 1931 – May 13, 2014) was an American winemaker. He was winemaker for Hanzell Vineyards for 28 years.

== Early life ==
Robert Sessions was born in Glendale, California, in 1931. He attended the University of California, Berkeley. He earned a degree in English literature in 1957. After graduation, he traveled to France and Brussels. His trip to Europe started his interest in wine. Sessions would marry Mary J. Cross, known as Molly, on December 19, 1959.

== Life in wine ==
Sessions was a self-taught winemaker. From 1964 until 1971, he worked at Mayacamas Vineyards. Next, he worked at Souverain as production manager. He also worked at Stags Leap Wine Cellars, which he helped open. While at Stags Leap, he helped Warren Winiarski create and bottle the 1973 Cabernet Sauvignon that was blind tasted in the Judgement of Paris.

=== Hanzell Vineyards ===
Sessions became winemaker and general manager at Hanzell Vineyards, in Sonoma, California, starting in 1973. He was recruited by then Hanzell winemaker Brad Webb. Hanzell Vineyards became a family affair for the Sessions, with wife Molly helping to manage the property and son Ben working in hospitality. Molly worked at the winery until her death from ovarian cancer in 2000.

At Hanzell, he created wines that Wine Spectator described as what "most winemakers could only dream of." He made primarily Pinot Noir and Chardonnay, with a foray into Cabernet Sauvignon in the 1980s. In 1999, the winery named a vineyard block was named after Sessions. Sessions also served as president at Hanzell, retiring in 2001 and becoming winemaker emeritus.

==== Production methods ====
His style was Burgundian in nature and Sessions was considered a "pioneer" for his early adoption of stainless steel tanks and French oak barrels. Despite being called a "pioneer," he respected the tradition of winemaking at Hanzell and sought to continue those traditions as winemaker. Sessions utilized the same wine production method, year after year, during his career at Hanzell. Grapes were picked at their ripest, early in the harvest season. The Chardonnay was fermented in stainless tanks prior to being aged in barrel. He did little treatment to the wines as they aged, enabling the wine varietals to represent their terroir. He also filtered his wines.

== Personal life and legacy ==
Sessions and his wife Mary (Molly) J. Cross raised two children, Sarah and Benjamin. Molly died of Ovarian cancer in 2000. Sessions would introduce his son, Ben, to cheesemaker and chef Sheana Davis. Davis became Sessions' daughter-in-law in 2016.

Sessions married Jean Arnold in 2002. He met Arnold while she served as a consultant at Hanzell Winery. She became President of Hanzell when Sessions retired. After a few months of marriage, Sessions was diagnosed as suffering from dementia in 2003. In December 2012, Arnold announced that Sessions had Alzheimer's disease. He had been suffering from the disease for almost ten years. He died on May 13, 2014, in Sonoma, California.

In 2014, a lot of wine called the "Hanzell Heritage Tribute" was auctioned at the Sonoma Harvest Wine Auction in memory of Sessions. The lot sold for $80,000.
