= Blankiet Estate =

Winery in California, United States

Coordinates: 38°23′55″N 122°22′58″W

Blankiet Estate is a California wine estate owned by Claude and Katherine Blankiet. Located in the foothills of the Mayacamas Mountains in the Napa Valley, the estate produces a portfolio of wines from their Paradise Hills Vineyard. The tasting room is located in the Renaissance period Castello that was built by a team of regional and international artisans.

Blankiet Estate

== History ==
The winery was created in 1996 on 46 acres ranging over several volcanic hills above the town of Yountville with the goal of producing wines of First Growth quality. In the 1990s, the best California wines became known as "cult wines" and a prominent winemaker making such wines was Helen Turley. She believed the Paradise Hills Vineyard had the potential to produce world-class wines and accepted the position as Blankiet Estate's winemaker. Wine critics Stephen Tanzer, Simon Woods, Robert M. Parker Jr. and Antonio Galloni validated her assessment. Tanzer listed Blankiet along with Harlan, Bond and Screaming Eagle as one of Napa’s most spectacular wines, "Simon Woods ranks California's cult Cabernets" listed Blankiet as a "First Growth wine" and Robert Parker stated in his Wine Buying Guide “The goal to produce world-class wines at Blankiet Estate has been accomplished, combining the extraordinary power of the site with unbelievable elegance and definition”.

David Abreu, a well-known viticulturist, was hired to develop the land, which Claude Blankiet described as a “puzzle of microclimates and terroirs”. The Paradise Hills Vineyards are divided by sub-faults of the West Napa seismic line. Cabernet Sauvignon was planted on the north side of the fault in layers of volcanic ash over a deeply-fractured Andesite rock base. The south side of the fault is composed of eroded Basalt covered with iron-rich red clay. Cabernet Franc and Petit Verdot were planted on gravelly-clay alluvial soils in the coolest part of the dividing canyon. Geologists David Howell, Ph.D., author of The Winemaker's Dance: Exploring Terroir in the Napa Valley, Sarah Lewis MacDonald, Ph.D., owner of Envision Geo and Dr. Walter J. Fitz, Ph.D., from the University of Natural Resources and Life Science in Vienna, Austria, were instrumental in demonstrating the unique geological complexity of the estate. The winery, connected to a deep underground network of caves, was designed by renowned architect John Lail.

In 2006, Blankiet became a forerunner in the fight against wine counterfeiting.

== Wine Production ==
Blankiet Estate produces annually about 1000 cases of flagship wines under three labels. "Blankiet Estate Proprietary Red", a bordeaux blend of Cabernet Sauvignon, Cabernet Franc, Merlot and Petit Verdot. Mythicvs, a pure Cabernet Sauvignon, ten times recipient of a 100-point rating and selected by TastingBook.com as the 3rd best Red wine in the world. Rive Droite, the highest New World-rated Pomerol blend of Merlot and Cabernet Franc. They also produce about 750 cases of “Prince of Hearts Red Wine,” classified by Robert Parker’s Wine Advocate as a “Napa Valley Super-Second”.
