= Hanzell Vineyards =

Hanzell Vineyards is a California wine producer located just outside the town of Sonoma. The winery was founded by James David Zellerbach (future United States Ambassador to Italy) who acquired 200 acres in the Mayacamas Mountains in 1943 and began planting Pinot Noir and Chardonnay in 1953. At the time, the entire state of California had fewer than 200 acres planted to Chardonnay.

Hanzel would go on to pioneer in the California several winemaking techniques that would become associated with the style of California Chardonnay including the use of barrel-aging, malolactic fermentation, and the use of inert gases and anaerobic winemaking. Hanzell was also among the first vineyards to plant the Wente Clone of Chardonnay.

== History ==
The first plantings of Hanzell took place in 1953, when Zellerbach planted two acres of Pinot noir and four acres of Chardonnay. James Zellerbach and winemaker Ralph Bradford "Brad" Webb aimed to produce wines that would compare favorably to Old World wines such as Burgundy, but were quick to adopt some of the modernizing winemaking techniques that became characteristic of New World style of winemaking. Webb commissioned what are believed to be the first small temperature-controlled stainless steel fermenters, an early nitrogen-sparged bottling machine and an electrode to measure dissolved oxygen.

== Vineyards ==
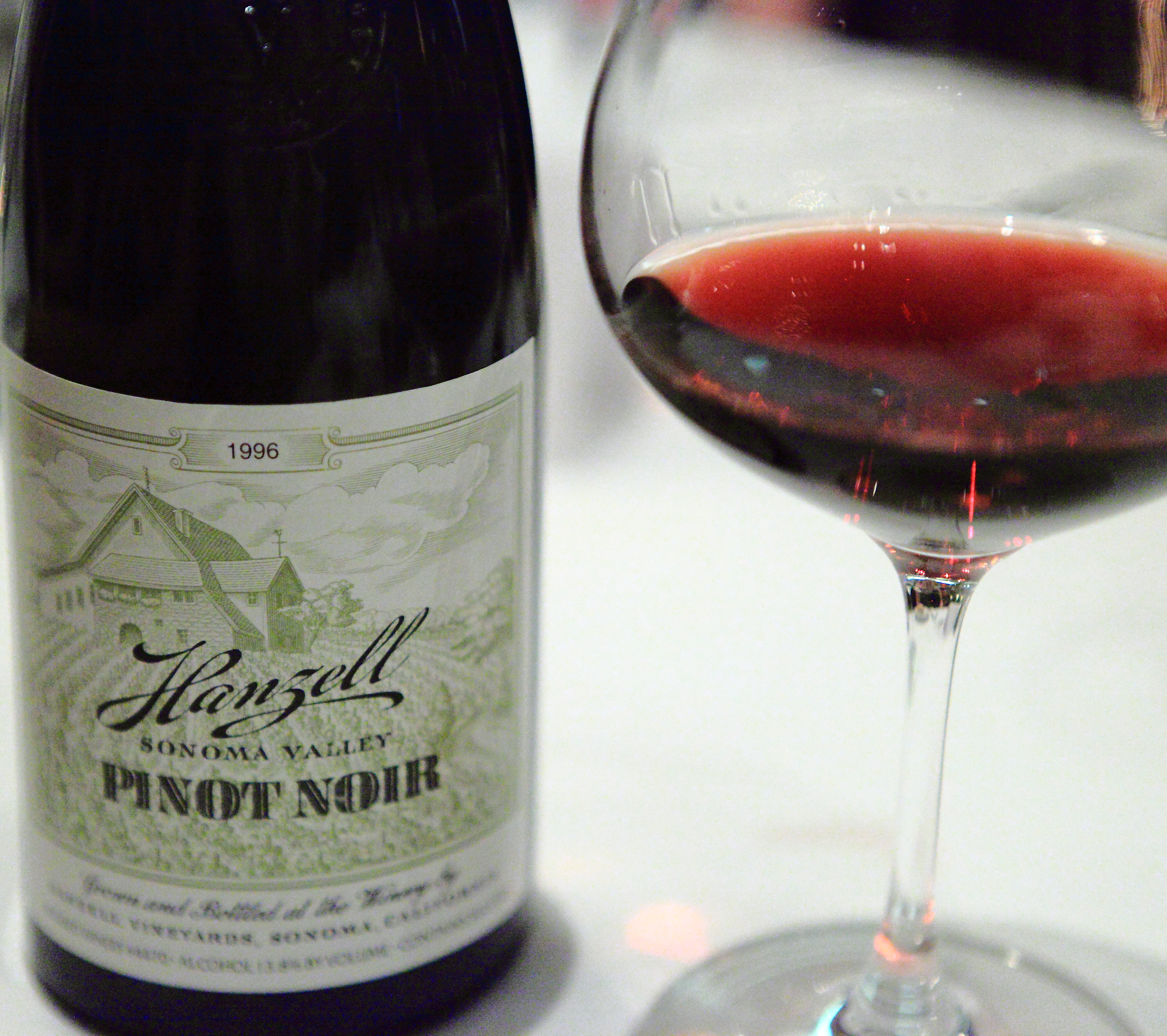
Hanzell Sonoma Valley Pinot noir.

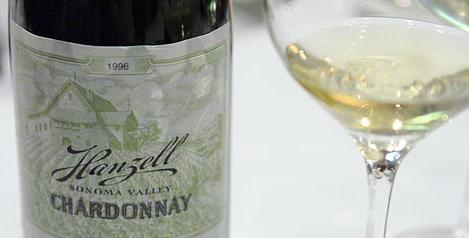
Hanzell Chardonnay from Sonoma Valley.

The original vines planted at Hanzell are purported to be the oldest continually producing Chardonnay and Pinot Noir vines in the Western Hemisphere. The original Chardonnay vines planted at Hanzell are Wente Clone and arrived at Hanzell by way of the McCreas' Stony Hill vineyard in St. Helena, which obtained its cuttings from the Wente Livermore Vineyard in 1948. The original Pinot noir vines planted at Hanzell were derived from Martin Ray estate cuttings (now commonly referred to as the Mount Eden clone). The original Pinot noir vines at Mount Eden Vineyards were pulled out in 1997, and the original block of Pinot noir at Chalone planted in 1946 was replaced in 2003. As of 2010, the 1953 blocks (C53 and N53) at Hanzell continue to produce, and the grapes are typically blended with grapes from the vines planted in subsequent years. From time to time, Hanzell bottles wines derived solely from these original blocks and dubs them "Ambassador's 1953 Vineyard" wines.

A total 42 acres have been planted at Hanzell over the years ranging from 1953 to 2001. Interest in local growing conditions and grape quality have persisted at Hanzell, and careful monitoring and selection have yielded a their own "Hanzell Clone." This clonal selection is now planted at other vineyards in California and is used by such wineries as ZD and Brewer Clifton, among others. Hanzell's involvement with the establishment of high-quality wine in California can be seen as well in the example of Joe Heitz' purchase of several barrels of Hanzell wine in 1963, which he blended with success, achieving lucrative prices for the times.

== Ownership and winemakers ==
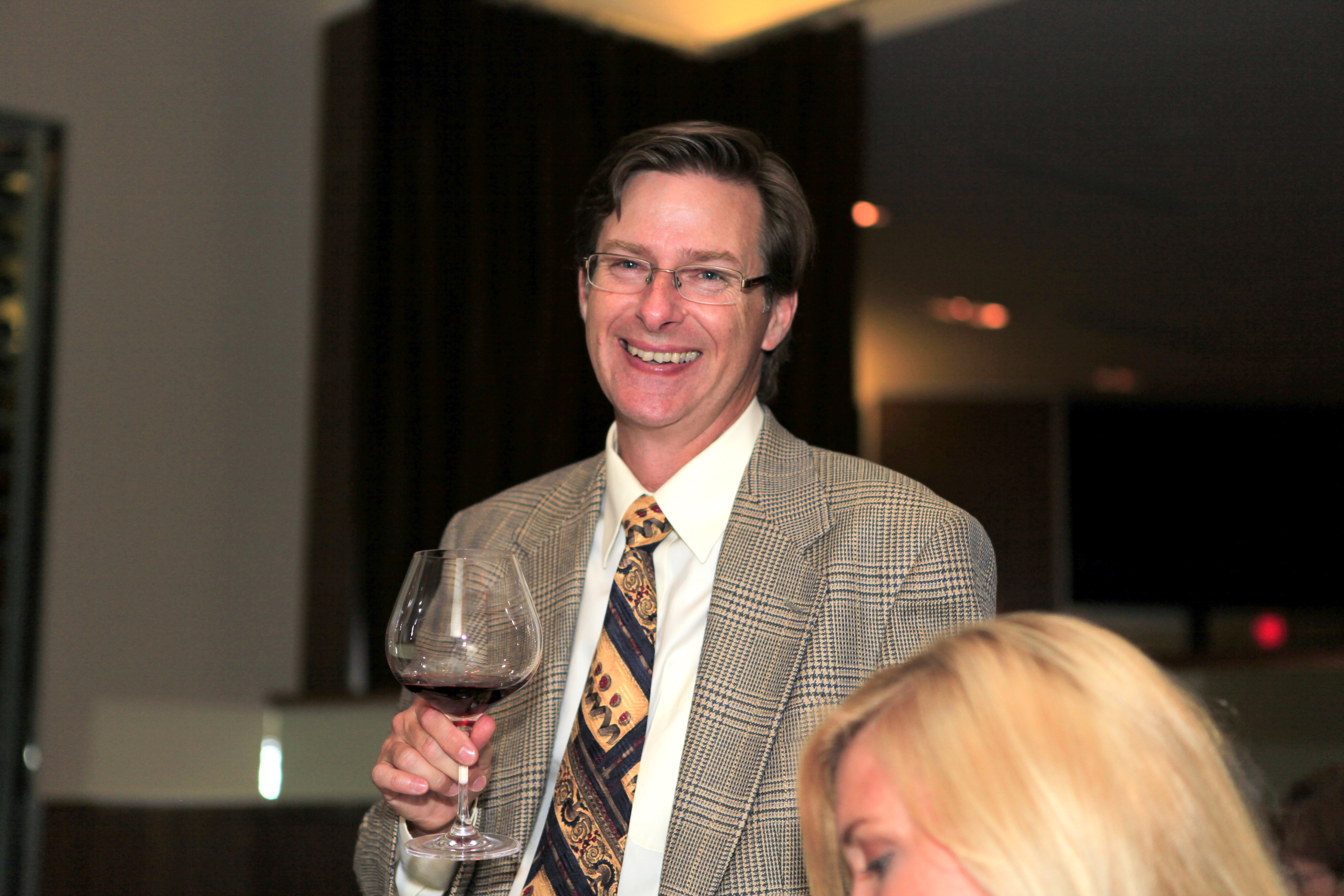
Current Hanzell winemaker, Michael McNeill.

Three families have owned Hanzell Vineyards and four winemakers have been involved there since its founding. The first winemaker was involved for nearly 20 years, and the second continues to advise as Winemaker Emeritus after nearly 30 years overseeing production.

- Zellerbach, James D. and Hana (inception to 1965)
- Day, Douglas and Mary (née Schaw) (1965 - 1975)
- de Brye, Jacques and Barbara, then Alexander (1975–present)

=== Winemakers ===
- Brad Webb (1956 - 1973)
- Bob Sessions (1973 - 2001)
- Michael Terrien (2001 - 2006)
- Michael McNeill (2006–present)
