= Grignolino =

Variety of grape

- Grape (Vitis)
- Color of berry skin: Noir
- Species: Vitis vinifera
- Also called: see list of synonyms
- Origin: Italy
- Notable regions: Piedmont
- VIVC number: 5019

Grignolino (Italian: [ɡriɲɲoˈliːno]) is a red Italian wine grape variety commonly grown in the Piedmont region. It makes light colored wines and rosés with very fruity aromas, strong acidity and tannins. The name Grignolino derives from the word grignole which means "many pips" in the local Piedmontese dialect of the Asti region. The abundance of pips, or seeds, contributes to the strong, bitter tannins associated with the wine. Modern winemakers try to avoid the excess tannins with gentle and slow pressings. Grignolino has three Denominazione di origine controllata (DOCs) that produce wine from it - Asti, Monferrato Casale, and Piemonte Grignolino.

== History ==
Ampelographers believe that the grape is native to the Monferrato hills located between the towns of Asti and Casale. The name Grignolino derives from the word grignole which means "many pips" in the local dialect of the region.

== Wines ==
Producers in the Asti region try to model Grignolino on the wines of Beaujolais and those made from the Dolcetto grape in the Cuneo. These light bodied, pale colored wines are made to be consumed young and while waiting for the brawnier, Nebbiolo and Barbera based wines of the region to age. While the grapes are relatively low in alcohol at around 11–12% ABV, they do have a significant amount of tannins due to the abundance of pips, or seeds. Modern winemaking techniques try to minimize the amount of tannin extraction by utilizing slow and gentle pressings. Wines made from Grignolino can have noticeably strong acidity and fruity aroma with alpine notes.

Grignolino is highly prone to mutation, creating a significant amount of clonal variation. These different clones of Grignolino can impart different aromas and flavor characteristics ranging from green herbal, leafy notes and vegetable stock to raspberry and fruit. The grape is also highly reflective of its terroir and the different types of vineyard soils that it may be planted in. Grignolino is also prone to millerandage, with clusters (or even grapes within a single cluster) at different stages of ripening. The severity of the millderandage varies from year to year and can dramatically affect the quality and yield totals of any given vintage.

=== Wine regions ===
Grignolino is primarily planted in the Asti province of Piedmont and is rarely found outside this region. One notable exception is the California producer Heitz Wine Cellars that grows a limited amount in their Napa Valley vineyard. Grignolino is also grown in the Santa Clara Valley at Guglielmo Winery in Morgan Hill. Guglielmo produces a dry Grignolino rose and also a red wine, both 100% Grignolino. Additionally, Grignolino is grown and blended with Dolcetto by Ripken Vineyards and Winery in Lodi, CA.

== Synonyms ==
Grignolino is also known under the synonyms Arlandino, Balestra, Barbesino, Barbesinone, Barbezina, Barbisone d'Espagne, Barbosina de Bologne, Girodino, Girrodino, Grignolino Comune, Grignolino Fino Nero, Grignolino Grosso Nero, Grignolino Rosato, Grignolino Rosso, Grugnolino, Grugnolino Pisano, Nebbiolo Rosato, Neretto di Marengo, Pollasecca, Rosetta, Rossello, Rossetto, Rossetto Cites, and Verbesino.
