= Pine Ridge Vineyards =

Winery in the Napa Valley

- Location: 5901 Silverado Trail, Napa, California, United States
- Coordinates: 38°24′19.08″N 122°19′56.26″W
- Wine region: California
- Appellation: Stags Leap District AVA; Rutherford AVA; Oakville AVA; Carneros AVA; Howell Mountain AVA
- Other labels: Fortis, ForeFront
- Founded: 1978
- Key people: Gary Andrus (founder); Michael Beaulac (winemaker)
- Parent company: Crimson Wine Group
- Area cultivated: 310
- Cases/yr: 85,000
- Varietals: Cabernet Sauvignon, Petite verdot, Pinot noir, Merlot, Chardonnay, Chenin blanc, Viognier
- Tasting: Open to the public
- Website: pineridgevineyards.com

Pine Ridge Vineyards is a winery in Napa, California, in the United States.

The winery was started by Gary Andrus and his then wife Nancy, in 1978. They wanted to grow and produce Cabernet Sauvignon and other Bordeaux wines. The tasting room is located in the Stags Leap AVA of Napa Valley. In 2000, the winery was put up for sale and was bought by Crimson Wine Group. The winemaker is Josh Widaman.

Andrus moved to Oregon in 1993 and died in 2009.
