= Baldacci Family Vineyards =

Winery in California, USA

Coordinates: 38.418292°N 122.337257°W

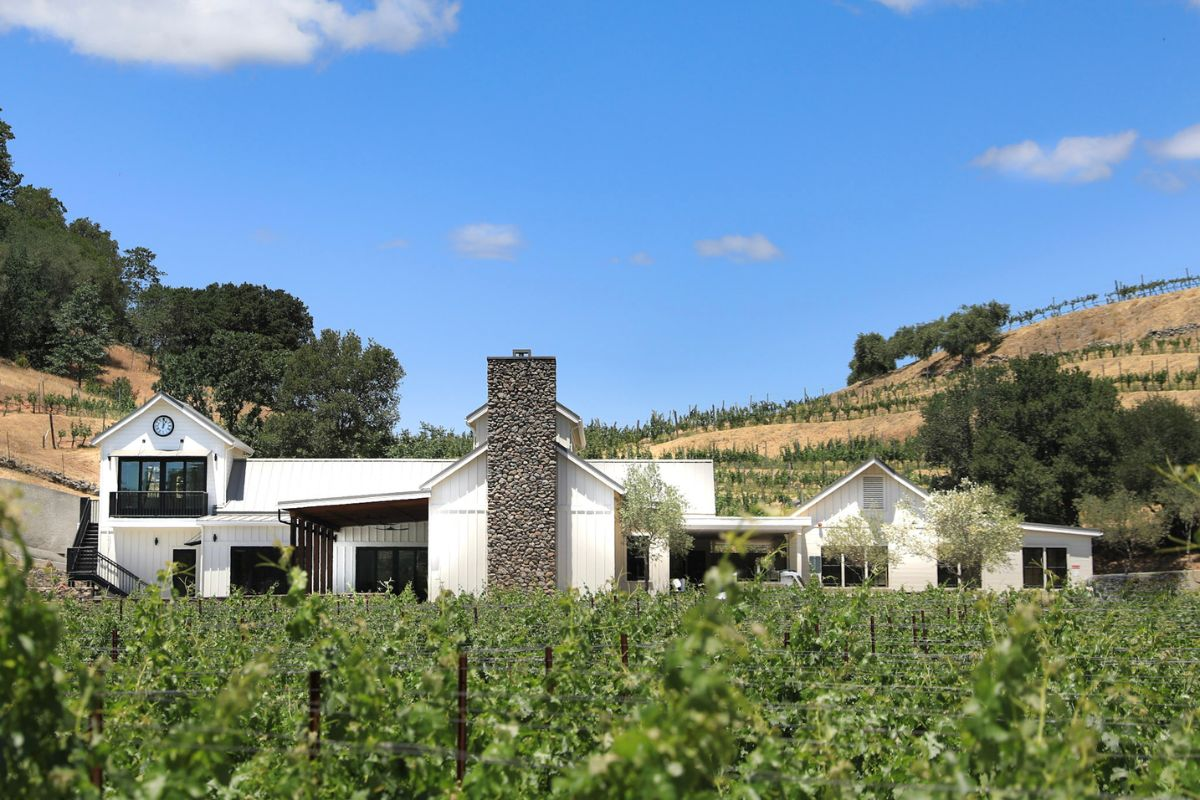
- Location: Yountville, California, USA
- Founded: 1998
- First vintage: 2000
- Key people: Thomas & Brenda Baldacci; Michael Baldacci, Winemaker; Kellie Duckhorn, General Manager
- Known for: Single-vineyard Cabernet Sauvignon
- Varietals: Cabernet Sauvignon, Chardonnay, Pinot Noir, Sparkling Wine, Red Blend, Syrah, Gewürztraminer
- Tasting: Open by prior reservation
- Website: https://www.baldaccivineyards.com/

Baldacci Family Vineyards is a family-owned winery located in the Stags Leap District AVA of Napa Valley. Established in 1998, Baldacci Family Vineyards owns over 50 acres of sustainably farmed vines in three distinct Napa Valley appellations: Stags Leap District, Calistoga, and Los Carneros. The wine portfolio is focused on limited-production, estate-grown wines.

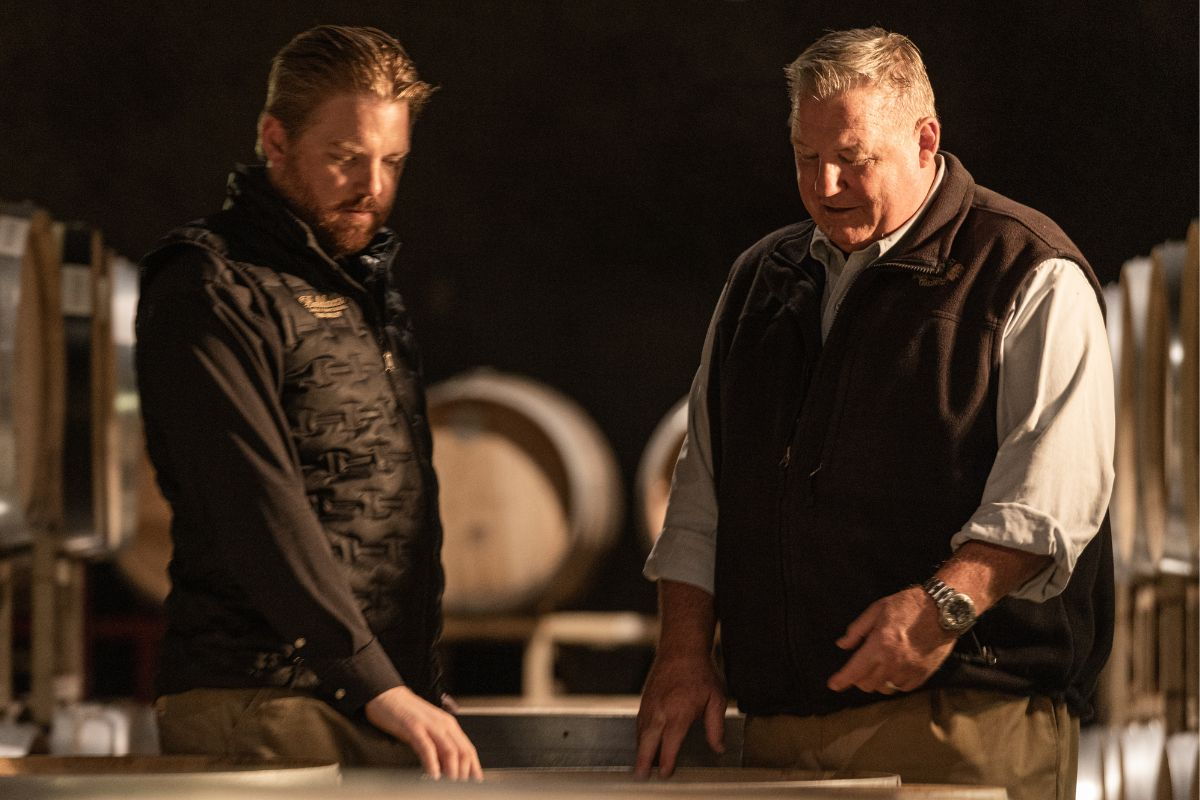
Winemaker Michael Baldacci and Owner Thomas Baldacci

== History ==
Over 25 years ago, Thomas and Brenda Baldacci were entranced by the beauty of the Napa Valley and the timeless heritage of the Stags Leap District. The generations before had left a deep and abiding affinity for the land from which came not only their livelihood, but their legacy. When they purchased the Stags Leap District property, Thomas and Brenda knew that they had found a place for their extended family to stay connected through the generations.

Today, second-generation vintner Michael Baldacci creates limited-production wines from three distinct estate vineyards located in the nested AVAs of Calistoga, Stags Leap District, and Los Carneros. The portfolio reflects the diversity of each estate vineyard with a focus on small lot, premium Cabernet Sauvignon wines. The wines have been favorably reviewed by renowned critics including Robert Parker Wine Advocate, Wine Enthusiast, and Decanter, among many others.

Along with Stags' Leap Winery and others, Baldacci Family Vineyards is a member of the Stags Leap District Winery Association.

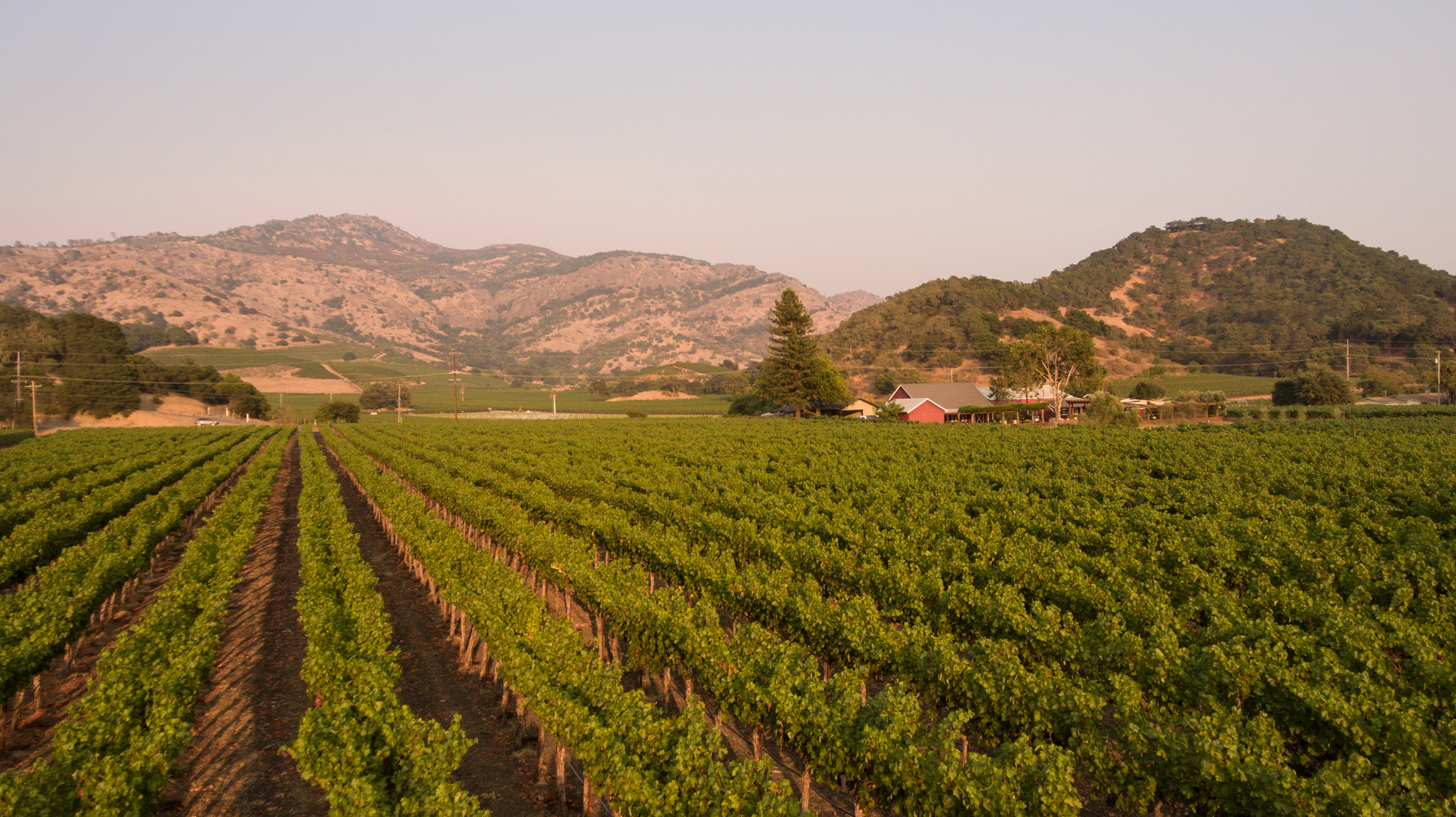
Winery Ranch in the Stags Leap District

== Vineyards ==
The winery owns three estate vineyards in the Napa Valley: Winery Ranch in the Stags Leap District, Honey B Vineyard in Carneros, and Stella Knight Vineyard in Calistoga and Diamond Mountain District.

The Baldacci family purchased the Stags Leap District property in 1998. Today, the property is home to the winery's Estate House and 19,210-foot wine cave and cellar, in addition to the 17 vine acres planted to Cabernet Sauvignon, and a small amount of Cabernet Franc and Petit Verdot.

The Honey B Vineyard, located on Cuttings Wharf in the Carneros AVA, was added to the estate vineyard portfolio in 2008. The 23-acre property is planted to Pinot Noir, Chardonnay, Syrah, Merlot, Cabernet Sauvignon, and Gewürztraminer.

In 2013, the estate vineyard portfolio expanded with the purchase of the Stella Knight Vineyard. The 8 acres of Cabernet Sauvignon grapes are located in Calistoga, at the base of the Diamond Mountain District. The region is one of the hottest parts of Napa Valley, with a soil series of volcanic bedrock and sediment, ideal growing conditions for premium wine grapes.

== Wines ==
Winemaker Michael Baldacci crafts a portfolio of elegant and classically styled Cabernet Sauvignon that is approachable in its youth, while still maintaining the complexity and stamina to age. Bottles are limited-production and hail from renowned vineyards and appellations in Napa Valley, including estate-owned vineyards in Stags Leap District, Calistoga, and Diamond Mountain District. The portfolio also includes red blends, sparkling, Chardonnay, Pinot Noir, and a late harvest Gewürztraminer.
