= Sheana Davis =

American cheesemaker, chef and culinary educator (1969–2026)

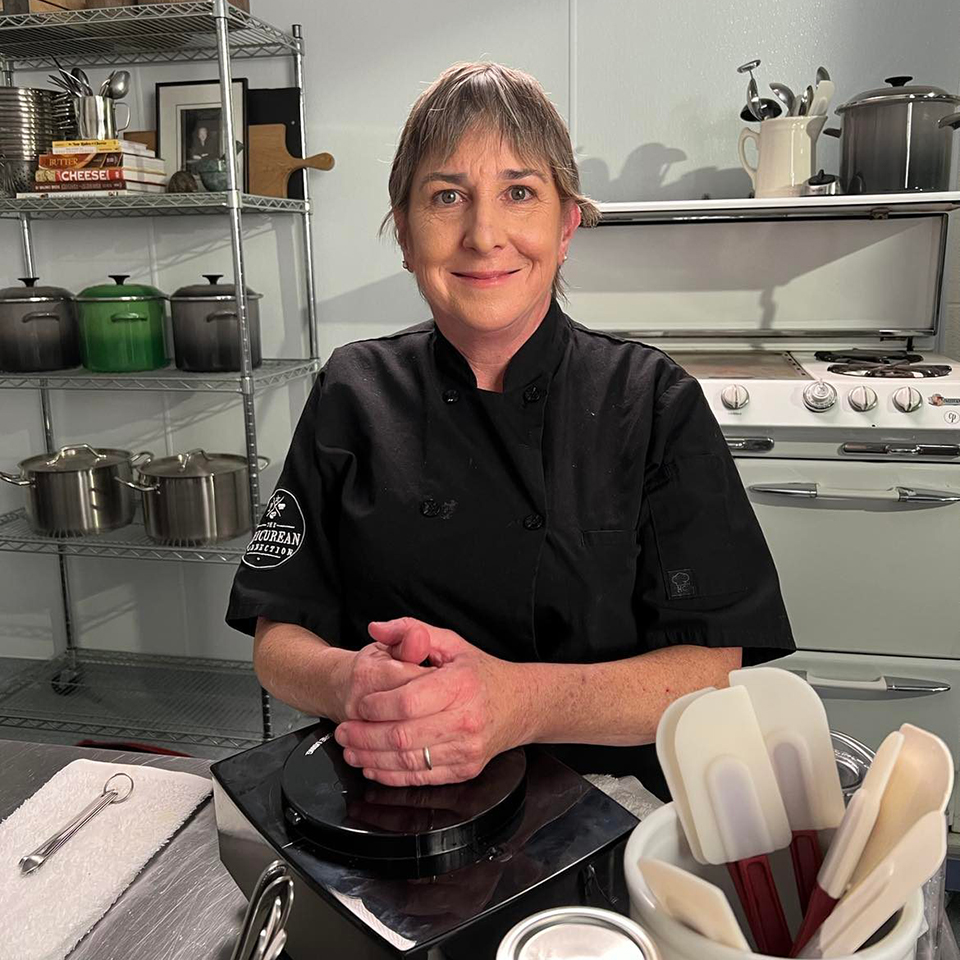
- Sheana Davis in 2016
- Born: 1969; Sonoma, California, U.S.
- Died: October 12, 2026 (aged 57)
- Education: Santa Rosa Junior College
- Spouse: Ben Sessions
- Culinary career
- Cooking style: Farm-to-table; Cuisine of New Orleans
- Website: www.theepicureanconnection.com

Sheana Davis (1969 – October 12, 2026) was an American cheesemaker, chef and culinary educator. She founded the Epicurean Connection, in Sonoma, California, and created the Delice de la Vallee cheese, along with other fresh cheeses. Davis also authored the book Buttermonger.

== Early life and education ==
Davis was born in Sonoma, California, in 1969. She learned how to cook from her grandfather, who served a meal to farmers and ranchers at the Sonoma Grange every Friday. When she was a teenager, she served as an apprentice under M.F.K. Fisher, and also worked for Ig Vella. Davis credits Vella as her mentor and for teaching her about entrepreneurship and food communities. He mentored her until his death in 2011.

In 1988, she earned a degree in Culinary Arts from Santa Rosa Junior College. That same year, she found a copy of the Commander's Palace Cookbook at a bookstore. The book launched a lifelong interest in New Orleans cuisine and culture. She proceeded to intern at Commander's Palace in New Orleans, Louisiana. Lolis Eric Elie describes Davis as an "expert" in New Orleans food.

After returning to Sonoma, she began catering. Her daughter Karina was born in 1992. That same year she started the Epicurean Connection. After buying a house in Sonoma, she met winemaker Bob Sessions. Sessions introduced Davis to his son, Ben, whom she would marry in 2016.

== Culinary career ==
After Hurricane Katrina, Davis visited New Orleans 14 times to help with rebuilding efforts, including feeding relief workers. Davis also promoted an event with chef Susan Spicer, in Sonoma, to raise funds for victims of the hurricane. Davis was featured in an advertising campaign for VerticalResponse in 2015. In 2016, Davis won an "Ultimate Fan" contest for her tailgating recipe using Nathan's Famous hot dogs at the 2016 Toyota/Save Mart 350. In 2016, Davis was named the curator of the Last House, the final home of M.F.K. Fisher, located in Glen Ellen, California.

Davis served as a cheese educator in Dubai on behalf of the US Dairy Export Council and the US Cheese Guild. As part of her work in Dubai, Davis participated in the Dubai Cheese Fest alongside fellow cheese expert Mark Todd.

In 2023, Davis released the book Buttermonger with her daughter Karina Davis. The book focuses on the history and use of butter and numerous butter recipes.

=== Epicurean Connection ===
The Epicurean Connection is a catering, cheese production, and cheese education company started by Davis in 1992. The business originally started as a marketing firm, which included Straus Family Creamery and Cowgirl Creamery clients.

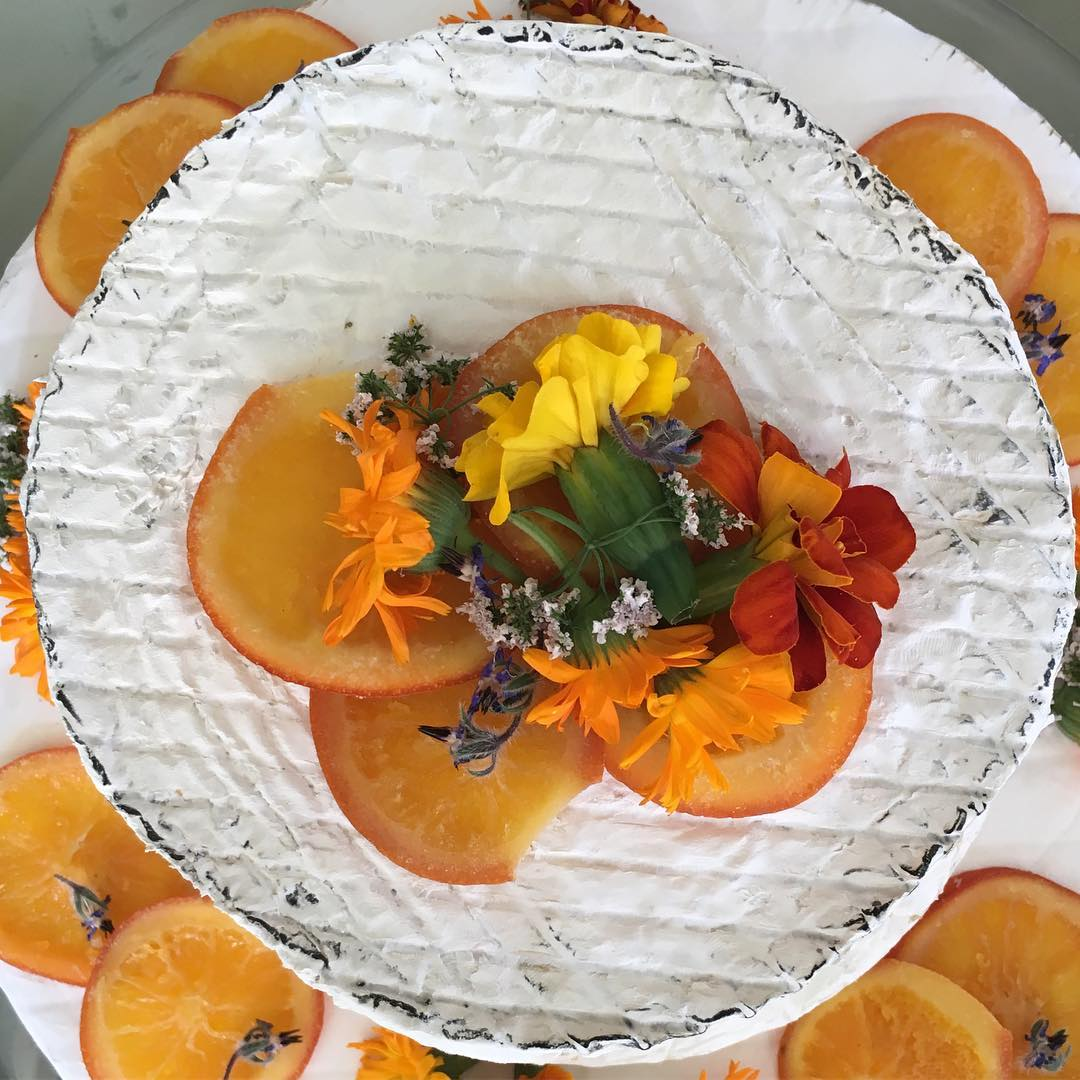
A "cheese cake" made by the Epicurean Connection

In 2005, Davis opened the Epicurean Connection in Boyes Hot Springs. It was originally going to serve as an office space for her marketing firm. Davis discovered her grandfather, who taught her to cook, had a business in the same space 40 years prior. Renovations to the space led to Davis finding that the space was originally built as a commercial kitchen. Thus leading Davis to open a small cafe. By 2011, the small shop had outgrown its space and Davis relocated the shop to downtown Sonoma.

The "new" Epicurean was a combination cheese shop, cafe serving lunch and dinner, and beer and wine bar. Food options included Tasso ham sandwiches, pulled pork sandwiches, soups, and cheese plates. The space also hosted regular concerts and potlucks, including a monthly Farmer Dinner, in which local farmers brought food to share and networked over dinner. Sunset named the Epicurean Cafe one of the top 50 local food shops in California. Davis closed the cafe, selling the cafe to chef Manuel Avezedo, in September 2015, to focus cheese production, catering and cheese education.

Today, under the Epicurean Connection, offers cheesemaking and cheese education classes to the general public and the restaurant industry. Classes are taught at various locations, including the Silverado Resort. Participants learn how to make ricotta cheese, resulting in a 2-3 pound finished cheese.

=== Cheesemaking ===
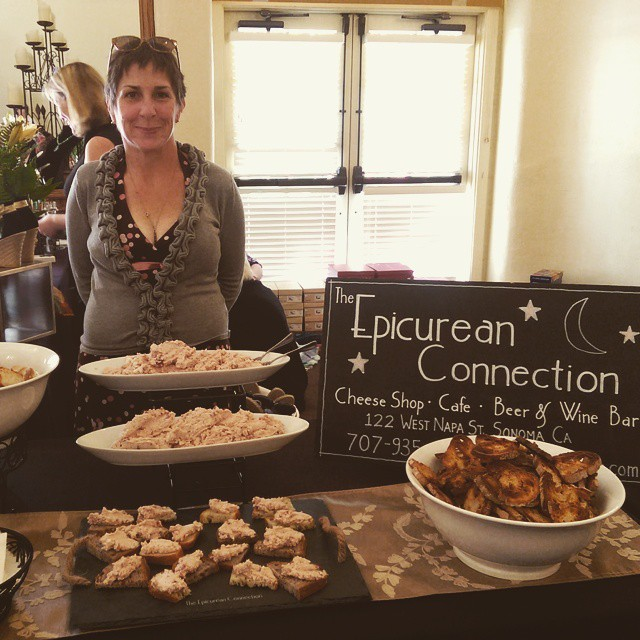
Davis serving Delice de la Vallee at an event in 2015

Davis produced multiple fresh cheeses, all which used local Northern California milks. She began experimenting with various cheeses left over from catering. She made fromage blanc, chevre and crème fraîche. Eventually, Davis created her first signature cheese, Delice de la Vallee.

Delice de la Vallee is a triple-cream cheese made from goat milk, cow milk cream and whole cow milk. It has been described as "creamy, fluffy, earthy and tangy." It was awarded a first place prize at the 2010 American Cheese Conference and Competition for the best "Fresh Unripened Mixed Milk" cheese. Delice was named one of the top cheeses for cheeseburgers by Saveur. Jay-Z and Beyoncé are fans of the cheese.

A second cheese, Creme de Fromage, was introduced in 2010. It is a triple cream cow's milk cheese. It is sweeter and thicker than Delice de la Vallee.

Davis' cheese production took place at a cooperative in Berkeley, California. She produced 500 pounds of cheese weekly. Her cheese was served at the French Laundry and Kendall-Jackson.

She was featured on Reinventing the Meal with Richard Blais in 2012 for her cheesemaking. She also founded the Sonoma Valley Cheese Conference and Winter Artisan Cheese Fair. In 2019, she was featured in Huffington Post for her mac and cheese, which uses five speciality cheeses.

== Illness and death ==
In 2026, Davis announced on social media that she had stage IV esophageal cancer. She died on October 12, 2026, at the age of 57.

== Bibliography ==
- Buttermonger (2023)
