= Warren Winiarski =

California winemaker (1928–2024)

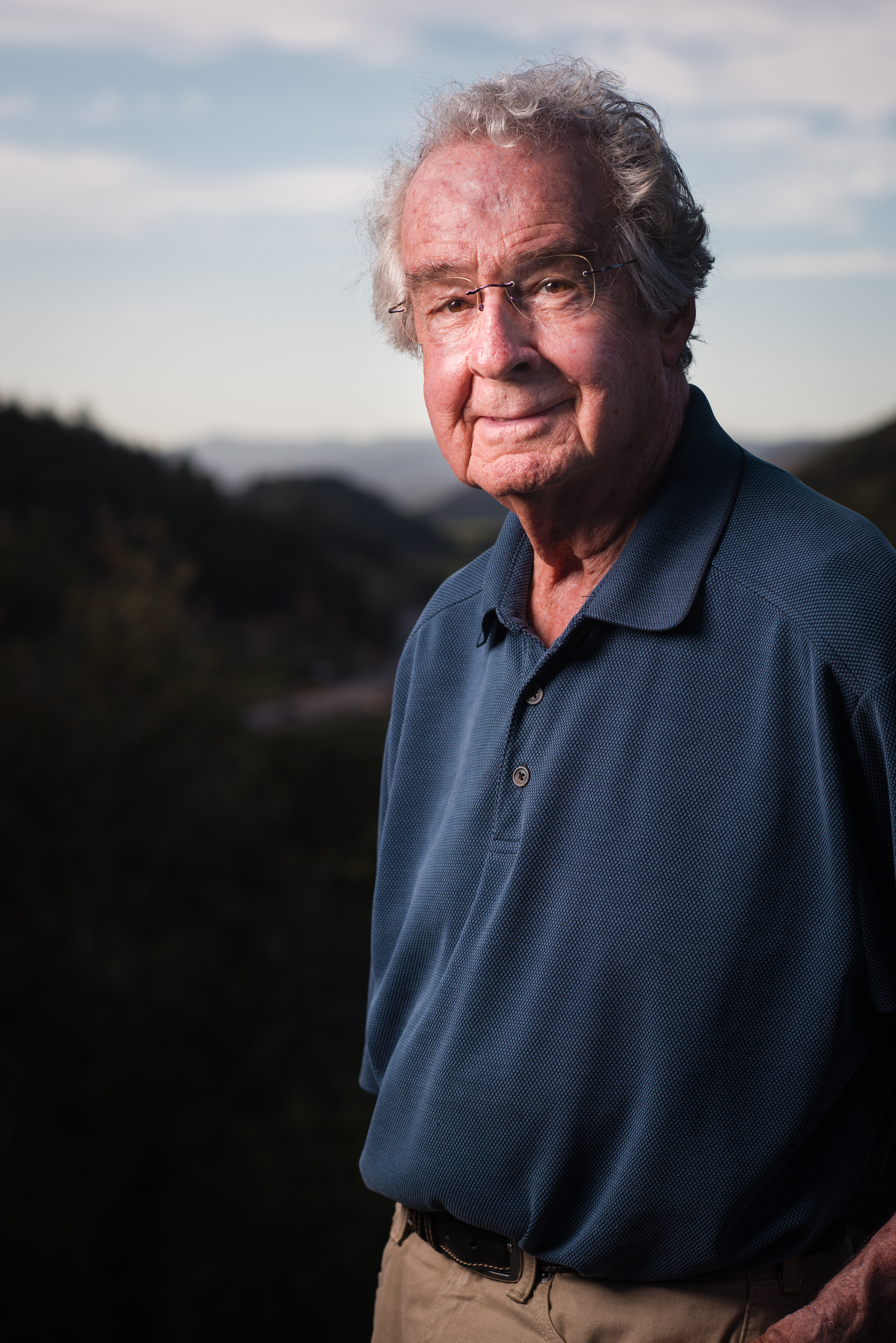
- Winiarski in 2015
- Born: October 22, 1928; Chicago, Illinois, U.S.
- Died: June 7, 2024 (aged 95); Napa County, California, U.S.
- Occupations: Winemaker, grape grower
- Known for: Award-winning winemaker, preservationist
- Website: www.warrenwiniarski.com

Warren Winiarski (/wɪˈnɜrski/ wih-nyar-skee) (October 22, 1928 – June 7, 2024) was an American Napa Valley winemaker and the founder and proprietor of Stag's Leap Wine Cellars.

Winiarski owned and operated Arcadia Vineyards within the Coombsville area of Napa Valley, which produces Chardonnay, Cabernet Sauvignon and Merlot. In 1976, Winiarski won the Judgment of Paris blind tasting for his 1973 Stag's Leap Wine Cellars Cabernet Sauvignon. He oversaw the Winiarski Family Foundation, which supports educational and charitable causes, in addition to teaching courses at the St. John's College Summer Classics program in Santa Fe, New Mexico. In 2017, Winiarski was inducted into the 11th class of the California Hall of Fame by Governor Edmund G. Brown Jr. for his global efforts to showcase and preserve the quality and history of California wine. The Smithsonian Institution, through its National Museum of American History, awarded Winiarski the James Smithson Bicentennial Medal on November 21, 2019.

== Background ==
Warren Winiarski was born to Stephen and Lottie Winiarski on October 22, 1928, in a large Polish section of Chicago, Illinois. His parents owned a livery business in Chicago and his father made honey wine, fruit-flavored, and dandelion wine at home which the family drank on special occasions.

He studied the western classics curriculum at St. John's College in Annapolis, Maryland, graduating in 1952; Winiarski then began his graduate work at the University of Chicago in political theory with Leo Strauss. While at St. John's College, Winiarski met his wife, Barbara and they were married in 1958.

During his studies at the University of Chicago, Winiarski spent a year in Italy (1954–55) studying the political thinker Niccolò Machiavelli. It was during that year he became convinced that he wanted to become a winemaker. He also lectured in the Basic Program of Liberal Education at the University of Chicago while working on his Ph.D. After contributing the chapter on Machiavelli in the Rand McNally textbook, History of Political Philosophy, he graduated in 1962 from the University of Chicago with a MA degree from the Social Sciences Division from the John U. Nef Committee on Social Thought with a specialty in Social Thought.

Winiarski died on June 7, 2024, at the age of 95.

== Winemaking ==
In 1964, Warren and Barbara Winiarski moved to Napa Valley, California, where Winiarski accepted a job as an apprentice winemaker working with Lee Stewart at Souverain Cellars, before moving on to be the first winemaker at Robert Mondavi Winery in 1966, while Michael Mondavi was away at National Guard Service. In 1968, Winiarski left Robert Mondavi Winery to make wine in Colorado at Ivancie Cellars. He selected California grapes that were to be shipped to Denver, where they were made into wine. Though Winiarski still lived in California, this project would kick start the Colorado wine industry.

In 1970, Winiarski and several investors bought a 44-acre (18 ha) prune orchard in the Napa Valley and replanted it to a vineyard. He removed the prune, cherry, and walnuts trees on the property and planted Cabernet Sauvignon and Merlot. In 1973 Winiarski built a winery near the vineyard and founded Stag's Leap Wine Cellars, and the next year, 1974, he introduced a reserve line, Cask 23. In 1976, Winiarski won the Judgement of Paris blind tasting for his 1973 Stag's Leap Wine Cellars Cabernet Sauvignon. The achievement brought worldwide recognition to California, Napa Valley, and Stag's Leap Wine Cellars.

In 1989, Warren chaired the Napa Valley Vintners committee that spearheaded and obtained passage of the California state law, State Senate Bill No. 771 (the Conjunctive Labeling Law), which required any wine bottled after January 1, 1990, and labeled with an American Viticultural Area (AVA) located entirely within Napa Valley must also include Napa Valley on the label "in conjunction with the other AVA designation of the wine." This law helped build brand equity for the individual AVAs as well as the Napa Valley, ensuring the region always had two winners and no losers. The law strengthened Napa Valley's position as a recognized world-class wine region.

In 2003, thirty winemaking alumni and the current winemaking team paid homage to Winiarski through the Hands of Time installation at Stag's Leap Wine Cellars. Each placed their hands into limestone aggregate to create a plaque. These plaques were mounted as a monument at the winery to remind those in the future of the opportunity to learn and go on. Those in attendance that day included John Kongsgaard, Bob Sessions, John Williams, Dick Ward, Rolando Herrera, Françoise Peschon, Paul Hobbs and Michael Silacci. Many of these winemakers had spent their formative years at Stag's Leap Wine Cellars with Winiarski.

In 1996, Winiarski and his wife, Barbara, initiated the Smithsonian Institution National Museum of American History's American Food & Wine History Project. The project uses food and wine history as a lens for understanding American history by tracing the long and diverse history of wine in the United States.

Winiarski created and taught a seminar at the Red, White and American symposium at the Smithsonian Institution on the 20th Anniversary of the Judgment of Paris. The symposium, much like the Paris tasting 20 years earlier, was a milestone in the history of American wine because it marked the Federal Government's recognition of wine as part of American culture.

In 2012, Stag's Leap Wine Cellars' 1973 Cabernet Sauvignon was received into the Smithsonian's National Museum of American History in Washington, D.C. permanent museum collection. The bottle is included in the "American Food & Wine History Project".

The bottle was included in the book, "The Smithsonian's History of America in 101 Objects", by Richard Kurin, the Smithsonian Institution's Under Secretary for History, Art, and Culture. Other items chosen for the book from the 137 million artifacts of the museum include Neil Armstrong's space suit, Charles Lindbergh's Spirit of St. Louis, and Lewis & Clark's compass.

On August 1, 2007, Stag's Leap Wine Cellars reached an agreement to be acquired for $185 million by UST Inc. and Marchese Piero Antinori.

Winarski continued his contributions to the Colorado wine industry. In honor of his influence and mentorship to the state's viticultural heritage, he was invited to participate as a Judge at the Colorado Governor's Cup Wine Competition from 2014 to 2018. In 2018, he was honored with the "Friends of the Colorado Wine Industry" award by the Colorado Association of Viticulture and Enology.

Winiarski owned and operated Arcadia Vineyards, in the Coombsville appellation within Napa Valley which produces Chardonnay, Cabernet Sauvignon, and Merlot.

== Philanthropy ==
The Winiarski Family Foundation has made donations to many conservation and preservation efforts, including those of the Smithsonian's National Museum of American History, wine and food history research, collecting of wine and food objects, the Smithsonian's Winemaker Dinners, Land Trust of Napa County, the Napa County Open Space District, the Jack L. Davies Napa Valley Agricultural Preservation Fund, If Given A Chance and The Pathway Home, among other organizations.

In 2018, the Winiarski Family Foundation made a $50 million matching grant to St. John's College in Annapolis and Santa Fe to help bridge the gap between what it costs the college to educate a student and what the student pays in tuition. The grant allowed the two Colleges to lower tuition costs by $17,000.

In June 2018, Winiarski donated $3.3 million to build the world's most comprehensive collection of wine writers work within the library at the University of California, Davis.

In October 2020, the Winiarski Family Foundation, awarded a $150,000 grant to Western Colorado Community College's Viticulture and Enology Program at Colorado Mesa University in Grand Junction, Colorado. The grant established the "Warren Winiarski, Gerald Ivancie Institute of Viticulture and Enology" and provides funding for scholarships, programs and research projects to assist Colorado's winemakers and grape growers as well as offer opportunities for a new generation in the Colorado wine industry.

== Land preservation ==
Winiarski was among the original promoters of the Napa Ag Preserve passed in 1968, Measure J in 1990 and its extension Measure P in 2008, Measure I in 2006, Measure Z 2017 and Measure C in 2018. Starting in 1990, Winiarski had donated nearly 200 acres to the Land Trust of Napa County, including the Paris Tasting vineyard and his current property, Arcadia Vineyards, in Coombsville AVA.

== Awards ==
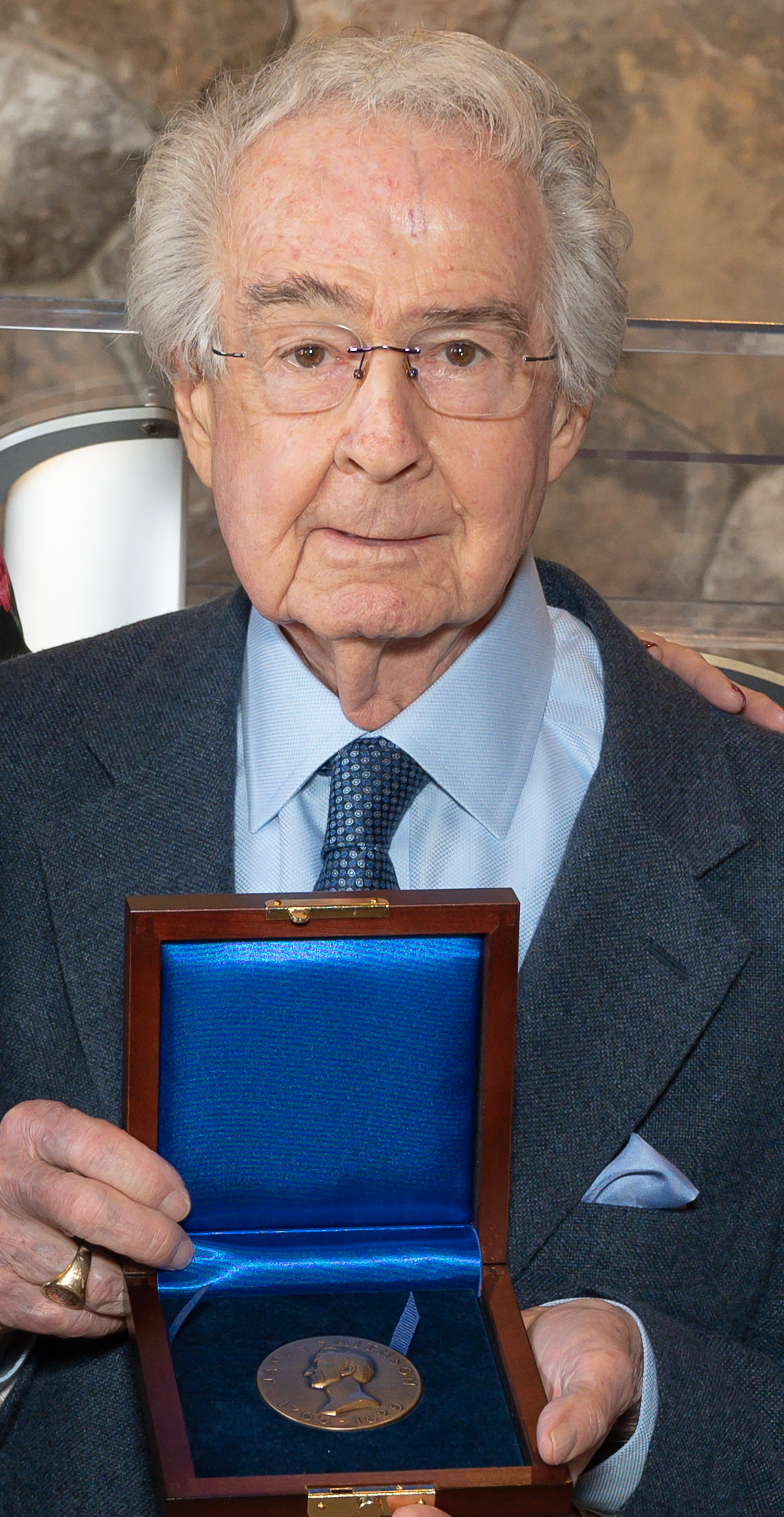
Winiarski with the 2019 James Smithson Medal

- 2019 James Smithson Bicentennial Medal, awarded by the Smithsonian Institution, National Museum of American History
- 2018 American Legend Wine Star, awarded by Wine Enthusiast
- 2018 Friends of the Colorado Wine Industry award, Colorado Association of Viticulture and Enology
- 2017 Inducted into the California Hall of Fame as member of the 11th Class by Governor Edmund G. Brown Jr.
- 2017 Acre by Acre award, received along with his wife, Barbara, Land Trust of Napa County
- 2017 Person of the Year, Czas Wina Magazine, Kraków, Poland
- 2016 United States Congressional Resolution 734, commemorating the 1976 Judgment of Paris Tasting's 40th Anniversary, Capitol Hill, Washington D.C.
- 2013 Thomas Jefferson Award, Pennsylvania Academy of Fine Arts
- 2012 Smithsonian Magazine includes the Stag's Leap Wine Cellars 1973 S.L.V. Cabernet Sauvignon as one of the "101 Objects that Made America"
- 2010 Distinguished Alumni Award, University of Chicago
- 2009 Inducted into the Vintner Hall of Fame, Culinary Institute of America, St. Helena, California
- 2008 Wine Lifetime Achievement Award, California State Fair
- 2006 United States Congressional Resolution 399, commemorating the 1976 Judgment of Paris Tasting's 30th Anniversary, Capitol Hill, Washington D.C.
- 2004 Warren Winiarski "Vintner of the Year" award received from COPIA: The American Center for Wine, Food and the Arts
- 1992 Award of Merit, St. John's College
- 1988 Harry Waugh Trophy for Stag's Leap Wine Cellars 1977 CASK 23 Cabernet Sauvignon, International Wine and Spirit Competition London, England
- 1976 First Place, Judgment of Paris, Stag's Leap Wine Cellars 1973 S.L.V. Cabernet Sauvignon: a blind tasting of California Cabernets and French first-growth Bordeaux by French wine experts, bringing worldwide recognition to California, Napa Valley and Stag's Leap Wine Cellars.

== Professional boards and associations ==
- 2004–present: If Given a Chance Foundation Board of Directors, Napa, California
- 2001–2015: Statue of Liberty Ellis Island Foundation Board Director and Chairman of the Heritage Award Committee
- 1994–present: St. John's College, Tutor, Summer Classics program
- 1986–present: Knights of the Vine, Supreme Knight. Founding member
- 1989–2009: St. John's College Board of Directors Emeritus Member, Warren Winiarski, Class of 1952

== See also ==
- Judgment of Paris (wine)
- List of wine personalities
- Stag's Leap Wine Cellars
