= Turley Wine Cellars =

American wine producer

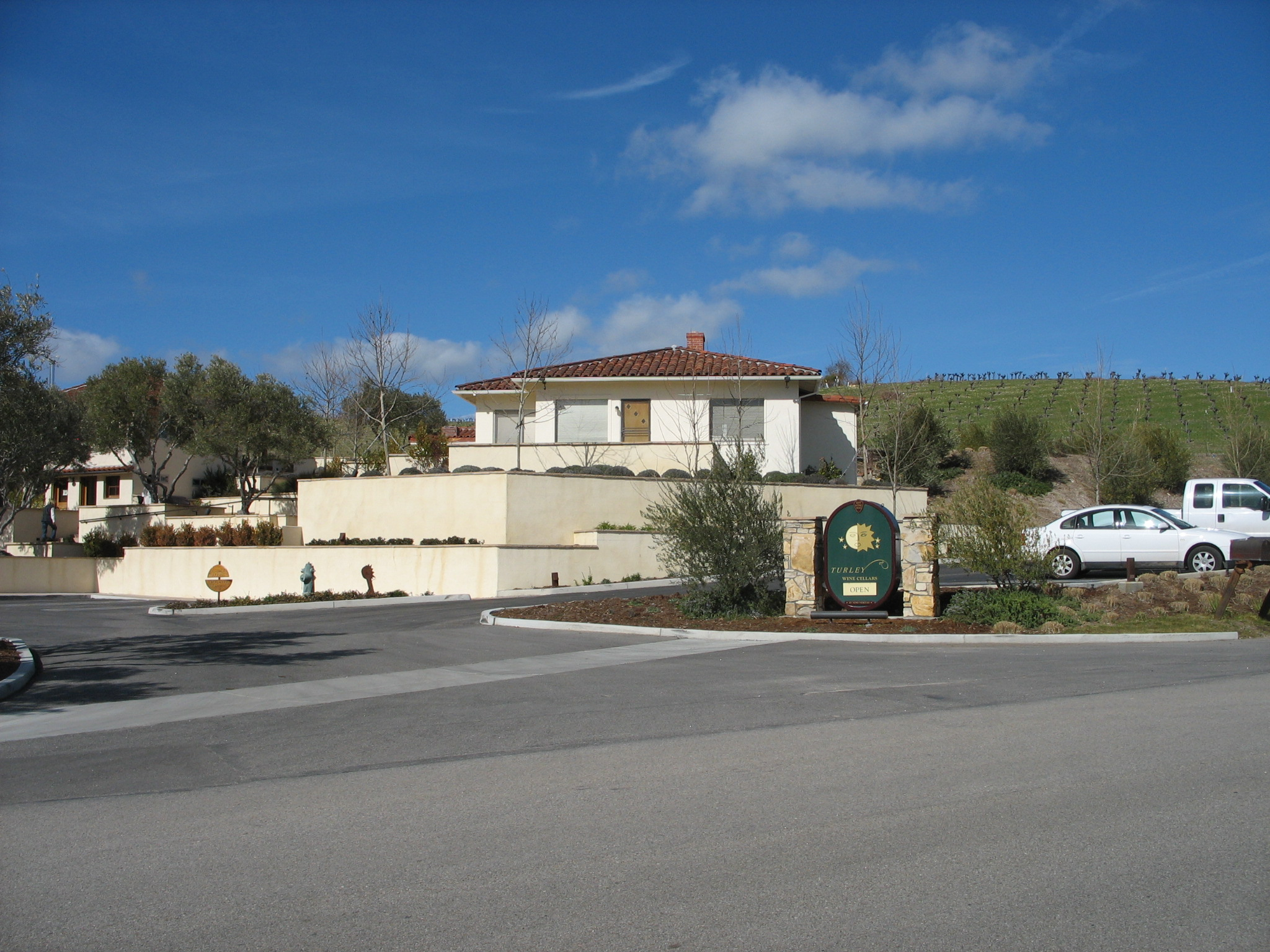
- Location: Templeton, California, USA
- Founded: 1993
- Key people: Larry Turley, founder
- Cases/yr: 16,000+
- Varietal: Zinfandel
- Distribution: limited
- Website: www.turleywinecellars.com

Turley Wine Cellars is a popular California wine producer with wineries in both Templeton (Southern Cal-Paso Robles wine region) and St. Helena (Northern Cal-Napa Valley wine region). Turley wines are often recognized as "making some of the best, if not the best Zinfandel in California for decades." Becoming a member of the winery's private wine club can take up to two years.

Turley specializes in wines made from old-vine red Zinfandel. They source fruit from older vineyards, some date back to the late 19th and early 20th centuries.

In previous issues of Wine Spectator magazine, Turley wines have received favorable reviews.

== History ==
In 1993, Turley Wine Cellars was founded by Larry Turley, brother of the well-known consulting winemaker Helen Turley. Turley had entered the wine business in 1981 as co-founder of the multi-varietal Frog's Leap Winery, but soon realized that his interest lay in wines made from the Zinfandel grape. Starting out with just one location in St. Helena, Turley Wine Cellars soon expanded to Templeton with the purchase of the historic Pesenti winery, where Zinfandel had been planted since 1923.

== Production ==
By 2011, Turley Wine Cellars is annually producing approximately 16,000 cases of award-winning Zinfandel and Petite Sirah wines using multiple "small" vineyards located in Napa and Sonoma counties, and other Paso Robles locations.
