= Helen Turley =

American winemaker

- Education: Cornell University
- Occupations: Winemaker, entrepreneur, wine consultant
- Known for: Cabernet Sauvignon, Pinot Noir, and Chardonnay
- Notable work: Marcassin Vineyard Chardonnay and Pinot Noir
- Spouse: John Wetlaufer
- Awards: Wine Spectator Distinguished Service Award, 2010; Food & Wine Achievement Winemaker of the Year, 1999

Helen Turley is a pioneering American winemaker and wine consultant. She is known for bringing several Californian cult wines to the public awareness, and as the owner of a 20-acre (8.1 ha) boutique winery, Marcassin Vineyard. She is the recipient of several prestigious American wine awards, to include Wine Spectator's Distinguished Service Award and Food & Wine's Achievement Winemaker of the Year. In 2019, she was inducted to the California Hall of Fame.

In addition to consulting for wineries such as Pahlmeyer, Bryant Family Vineyard, Colgin, Martinelli and Blankiet, until 1995, she was the winemaker for Turley Wine Cellars.

== Career ==
Turley graduated from Cornell's agricultural school in the 1970s, and moved to the Napa Valley, landing at Robert Mondavi's lab. By 1984 she had her first job as a winemaker but began thinking differently about winemaking when she made two barrels of wine using wild yeast in 1989.

During her career, Turley evangelized a variety of winemaking methods that were unique for their time. She was one of the first winemakers in California to use cold soaks and to focus on harvesting phenolically ripe fruit so as to make the wine as natural as possible.

During the 1990s, Turley helped usher in the era of the superconsultant in California, taking startups such as Peter Michael, Colgin and Bryant Family to fame as her winegrowing regime pushed wine quality to new heights. She gained renown helping many small wineries make exceptional wine. "Don't get in the way of the wine," Turley drilled in her pupils and mentees; "If you've got the right vineyard—the right grapes—you can make great wine."

At one point, Turley simultaneously made wines for Colgin, Bryant, Turley, Martinelli, Pahlmeyer, Green & Red, Harrison, La Jota, Landmark and Canepa, as well her and husband John Wetlaufer's own label, Marcassin. Some of her early triumphs came with the Napa Valley Cabernets of Bryant and Colgin, which shared her signature style of bold and extracted flavors underscored by finesse, polish and refinement. Turley is also credited with helping raise the quality of Chardonnay in both Napa and Sonoma. With Marcassin, and the wines she made for Martinelli, Turley was instrumental in putting Sonoma Coast on the map.

== Lawsuits ==
In 2001, the Roy Estate hired Turley and her husband, John Wetlaufer, to design their 17-acre (6.9 ha) Napa Valley vineyard and for Turley to serve as consulting winemaker. After making Roy Estate's 2003 & 2004 vintages, Turley canceled the arrangement in March 2005. The following September, the owners of Roy Estate filed a lawsuit against Turley and Wetlaufer alleging breach of contract. The lawsuit was eventually settled out of court in May 2006.

== See also ==
- List of wine personalities
