= Silverado Vineyards Winery =

Coordinates: 38.412273°N 122.336283°W

Silverado Vineyards
- Location: Yountville, California, USA
- Appellation: Stags Leap District AVA
- Other labels: Miller Ranch
- Founded: 1981
- Key people: Diane Marie Disney, Ron W. Miller, co-founders Jonathan Emmerich, Winemaker; Russ Weis, General Manager
- Varietals: Chardonnay, Sauvignon blanc, Sangiovese, Cabernet Sauvignon, Merlot
- Distribution: national
- Tasting: by appointment
- Website: www.silveradovineyards.com

Silverado Vineyards is located east of Yountville, California in the Stags Leap District of Napa Valley.

== History ==
Ron and Diane Miller purchased the land with existing vineyards in the mid-1970s. The winery takes its name, "Silverado," from the historic vineyard which surrounds it. The vineyard borrowed its name from the abandoned mining town at the top of the Napa Valley.

Although the Millers' original intention was to only grow grapes, they began construction of their own winery on the property in 1981. Architect Dick Keith designed the old California mission style structure.

The winery has acquired a total of seven family owned vineyards located in various districts throughout the Valley. Silverado produces Sauvignon blanc, Chardonnay, Merlot, Sangiovese and Cabernet Sauvignon. The previous owners of the vineyard were the See family of See's Candies.

In July 2022, Silverado Vineyards was acquired by Foley Family Wines, with an estimated purchase price of over $150 million.

== See also ==
- List of celebrities who own wineries and vineyards
