= Stag's Leap Wine Cellars =

Winery in Napa Valley, California

- Location: Napa, California, United States
- Coordinates: 38.399343°N 122.325543°W
- Appellation: Stags Leap AVA
- Founded: 1970
- First vintage: 1972; 54 years ago
- Key people: Warren Winiarski, founder Marcus Notaro, winemaker
- Parent company: Antinori
- Cases/yr: 100,000
- Known for: Cabernet Sauvignon
- Varietals: Cabernet Sauvignon, Chardonnay, Cabernet Franc, Sauvignon blanc
- Website: https://www.stagsleapwinecellars.com/

Stag's Leap Wine Cellars is a winery founded by Warren Winiarski in 1970 and based in the Stags Leap District of Napa Valley, California.

The winery achieved significant international recognition in 1976, six years after its establishment, at the Paris Wine Tasting of 1976, also known as the Judgment of Paris, where its 1973 vintage Cabernet Sauvignon won first place among ten top French and California red wines in a blind taste test by predominantly renown French oenophiles.

The French wines submitted were prestigious first and second growths wines from the 1970 and 1971 vintage from Château Mouton-Rothschild, Château Haut-Brion, Château Leoville Las Cases and Château Montrose.

The result of the tasting has been described by Decanter as "a victory that put California on the winemaking map, and established Stag’s Leap Wine Cellars as a global superstar".

== History ==
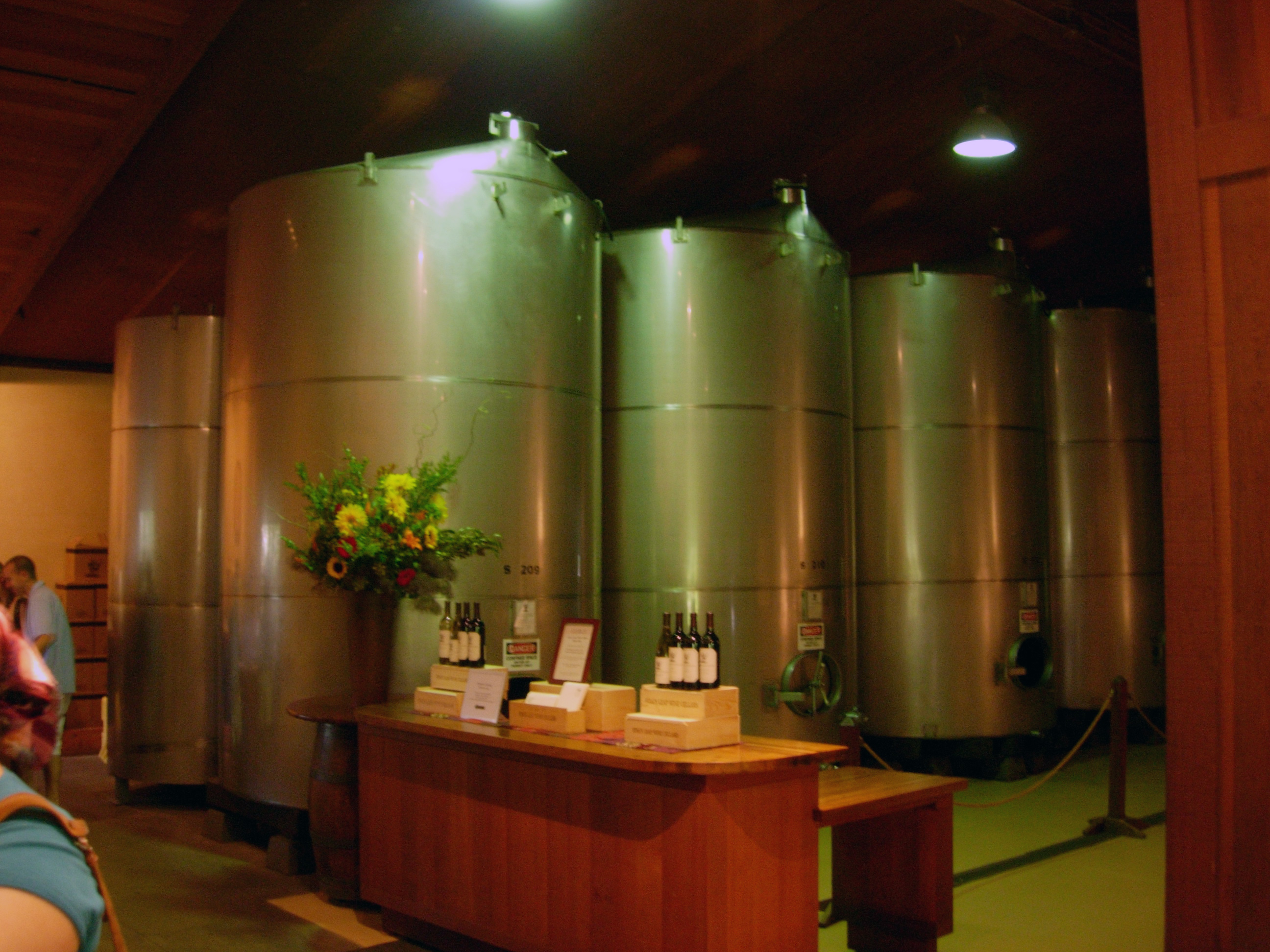
Stainless steel fermenting containers that are part of the Stag's Leap Wine Cellars

Warren Winiarski was introduced to wine while on a year-long trip to Italy studying the work of Niccolò Machiavelli. After returning to Chicago, he found an interest in wine and in the early 1960s began to experiment with making his own wine at home. He moved to the Napa Valley with his wife and children in 1968, and took up a job with Chateau Souverain. Following this, he moved to work at the newly started Robert Mondavi Winery.

Stag's Leap Wine Cellars was founded in 1970 after Winiarski purchased a 44-acre (18 ha) block of land for under $200,000 that was situated next to the vineyard owned by modern Napa Valley Cabernet winegrowing pioneer Nathan Fay. Winiarski decided on purchasing land in the region after tasting a homemade wine from Nathan Fay's vineyard, after tasting the wine Winarski stated "I said to myself, Eureka! That’s it. This wine satisfied what I hoped was possible in the Napa Valley. It had not only regional character but also elements of classic or universal character."

The purchased plot was planted to prune trees, cherries and walnuts as well as a small amount of Petite Sirah and Alicante Bouschet, these were replaced with Cabernet Sauvignon and Merlot vines and the vineyard was renamed to "Stag's Leap Vineyard" or "S.L.V".

The first vintage produced from the new vineyard was in 1972 and was produced in a rented facility. Winiarski was in charge of making the wine, with assistance from Andre Tchelistcheff. The second vintage—the first that was produced at the estate and in commercial quantities— was from 1973. This '73 vintage was entered into and subsequently rated the top red wine at the now historic Judgment of Paris in 1976, launching the winery into the international spotlight.

Following this achievement, the winery began to expand its land holdings, purchasing the neighboring "Fay" Cabernet Sauvignon vineyard in 1986, which nearly doubled the vineyard size owned by the estate, and a Chardonnay vineyard named "Arcadia" from Mike Grgich in 1996. Grgich was the winemaker at Chateau Montelena in the early 1970s and he produced the counterpart winning Californian Chardonnay at the 1976 Judgment of Paris.

A lawsuit initiated by Winiarski and a counter-suit filed by Carl Doumani, owner of Stags' Leap Winery, was decided in 1986 by the California Supreme Court. The two wineries were founded in the same year, and both claimed first use of the name "Stag's Leap". The court decided that the wineries were named after the area, so both were allowed to use the name. The judgment included a provision that Winiarski would keep the apostrophe before the "s" in his winery name, where Doumani would use the apostrophe after the s.

Winiarski and Doumani became friendly after the lawsuit was concluded, releasing a 1985 vintage Cabernet Sauvignon with an equal percentage of grapes from each estate and named "Accord". They also worked together in an attempt to stop the Stags Leap American Viticultural Area from being created, but they were unsuccessful and the AVA was ratified as a sub-region of the Napa Valley AVA in 1989.

In August 2007, Winiarski sold the winery to Chateau Ste. Michelle and Marchesi Antinori Srl for a reported value of US$185 million. The sale included the winery facilities, as well as the SLV and Fay vineyards. The Arcadia vineyard was kept by the Winiarski family and will continue to provide fruit to the winery on a contract basis. Winiarski, 79 at the time of the sale, was looking to retire and his family members were not in a position to continue running the business. Winiarski agreed to continue as a part-time advisor for three years following the sale. In May 2023, Marchesi Antinori bought Ste. Michelle's 85% stake and became the sole owner.

== Judgment of Paris and subsequent competitions ==
The winery achieved significant international recognition in 1976, four years after its establishment, at the Judgment of Paris where its 1973 vintage Cabernet Sauvignon won first place among ten top French and California red wines in a blind taste test by leading French wine experts. The French wines tasted were prestigious first and second growths wines from the 1970 and 1971 vintage from Château Haut-Brion, Château Mouton-Rothschild, Château Leoville Las Cases and Château Montrose.

The result of the tasting has been described by Decanter as "a victory that put California on the winemaking map, and established Stag’s Leap Wine Cellars as a global superstar", and by Paul Lukacs as "most important, it enabled not only the United States but also Australia, South America, and the rest of the New World to emerge as legitimate sources of increasingly superior wines."

A bottle of 1973 Stag's Leap Wine Cellars Cabernet Sauvignon was placed into the Smithsonian National Museum of American History collection in 1996 as a result of placing first in this competition and to reflect the impact that the achievement had on the United States wine industry.

The bottle was also included in the book, The Smithsonian’s History of America in 101 Objects, by Richard Kurin, the Smithsonian Institution’s Under Secretary for History, Art, and Culture. Other items chosen from among the collections for this historic list included Neil Armstrong’s space suit, Abraham Lincoln’s top hat, Charles Lindbergh’s Spirit of St. Louis, and Lewis & Clark’s compass.”

The San Francisco Wine Tasting of 1978 was a re-tasting of the same wines 20 months after the Paris event. Stag's Leap again won first place with a different set of judges.

At the French Culinary Institute Tasting of 1986, held ten years after Paris, Stag's Leap received sixth place, and in the Wine Spectator Tasting of 1986 it won fourth place.

In the Judgment of Paris 30th Anniversary tasting with the same wines and vintages tasted at the original Judgment of Paris competition, Stag's Leap achieved second place.

== Vineyards ==
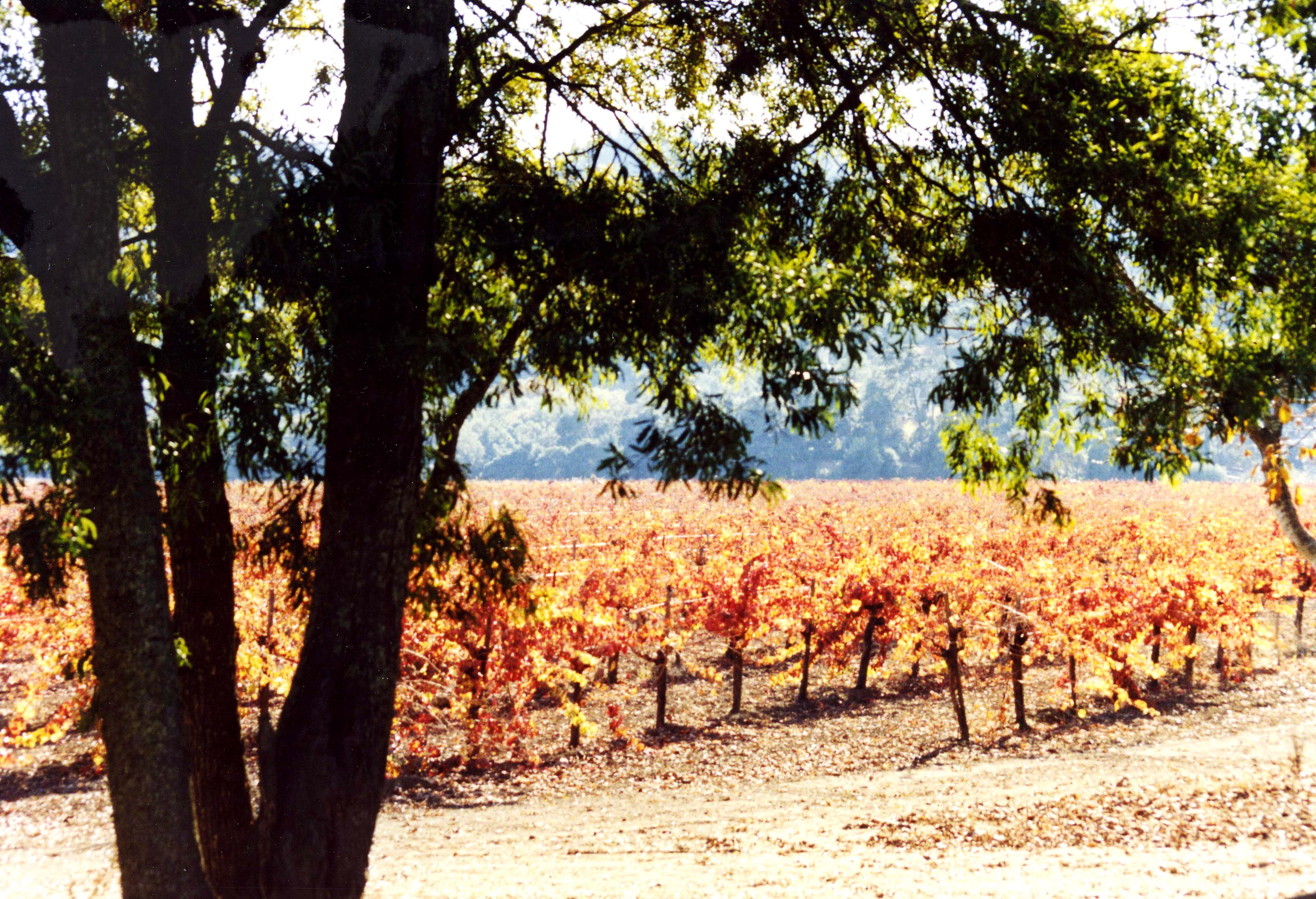
Vineyards at Stag's Leap in 1990

The "S.L.V." (Stag's Leap Vineyard) was the initial vineyard owned by the estate. It consists of 35 acres (14 ha) of Cabernet Sauvignon and one acre (0.40 ha) of Cabernet Franc. This vineyard was the source of the grapes that produced the wine that won the 1976 Judgment of Paris.

The "FAY" vineyard was purchased in 1986. This was the vineyard that originally inspired Winiarski to make wine in this area. It is the oldest Cabernet Sauvignon vineyard in the area and consists of 66 acres (27 ha) of Cabernet Sauvignon and one-half acre (0.20 ha) of Petit Verdot.

Arcadia is a 128-acre (52 ha) vineyard near Mount George in the Napa Valley. The vineyard was purchased in 1996 from Mike Grgich. It was retained by the Winiarski family after the sale of the estate in 2007. Winiarski placed the property into the Land Trust of Napa County in perpetuity, so it can never be developed. The Antinori family purchased the vineyard from the Winiarski estate in February 2025 and Stag's Leap Wine Cellars continues to make Cabernet Sauvignon and Chardonnay from it.

== Wines ==
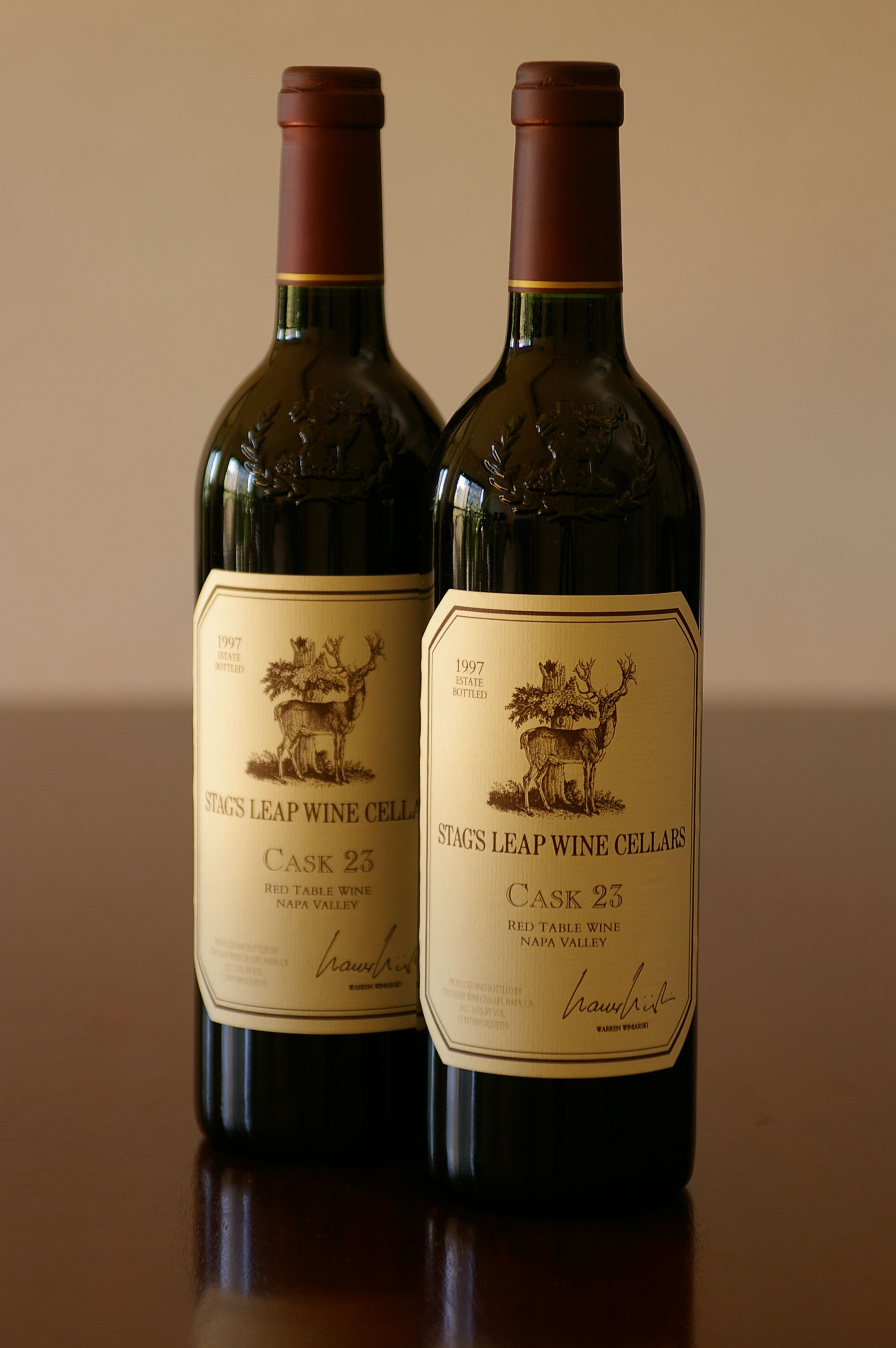
Bottles of Stag's Leap Cask 23 Cabernet Sauvignon

The estate wines are a series of three single vineyard Cabernet Sauvignons, "S.L.V." (Stag's Leap VIneyard) and "FAY," and "CASK 23." The first vintage of CASK 23 wine was produced in 1974, after Winiarski noticed that a specific cask, numbered 23, stood out from the other casks produced that year. It is not produced every vintage, but only in years that are viewed by the winemaking team as producing excellent quality fruit.

Other wines in the top level "Estate & Single-Vineyard Collection" include two Cabernet Sauvignon single vineyard wines, from the "S.L.V" and "Fay" vineyards, as well as a Chardonnay from the "Arcadia" vineyard.

Stag's Leap Wine Cellars produces a mid-level range under the designation "Napa Valley Collection". These wines are made from estate owned vineyards as well as purchased grapes from other vineyards in the Napa Valley. Wines in this range include a "ARTEMIS" Cabernet Sauvignon, "KARIA" Chardonnay and a "AVETA" Sauvignon blanc.

== See also ==
- California wine
- Wine competitions
- Judgement of Paris (wine)
- Warren Winiarski
