= Stags' Leap Winery =

Winery in California, United States

Coordinates: 38.414167°N 122.321356°W

- Location: Yountville, California, USA
- Appellation: Stags Leap District AVA
- Founded: 1893; ended due to Prohibition; re-established 1971
- Key people: Christophe Paubert, Winemaker; Joanne Wing, Associate Winemaker
- Parent company: Treasury Wine Estates
- Varietals: Viognier, Chardonnay, Merlot, Cabernet Sauvignon, Petite Syrah, Grenache, Carignane, Peloursin, Mourvedre, Syrah
- Website: www.stagsleap.com

Stags' Leap Winery is a winery located near Yountville, California, United States, in the Stags Leap District of Napa Valley. The winery's 240-acre (97 ha) estate vineyard was first planted in 1893. In 1997, Stags' Leap was purchased by Beringer Wine Estates, which in 2000 was in turn purchased by the Australian company Foster's Group, whose two wine groups combined to become Beringer-Blass Wine Estates. Beringer-Blass was demerged from Fosters in 2011 to become Treasury Wine Estates. Robert Brittan continued the revitalization of the vineyards and winery until 2005.

A wine tasting and visitation space is being converted from the winery's 19th-century manor bed-and-breakfast, to increase its daily visitation from 10 to 40 appointments per day, with food and wine pairings, by the parent company Treasury Wine Estates

== History ==
The winery was founded by Horace Chase and his wife Minnie Mizner Chase, sister of the future Florida architect Addison Mizner. Mrs. Frances Grange acquired Stags' Leap Winery from Horace Chase in 1913. She transformed the property into a working ranch and resort. Wine production ceased due to Prohibition. The vineyard remained, however, with the grapes being sold to other producers. Wine production began again in earnest in 1971 when Stags' Leap was purchased by Carl Doumani. Over a period of almost three decades, Doumani restored and improved the property. The winery's signature product was its Petite Sirah at the time an undervalued grape used mostly for blending purposes. In 1988 Doumani hired winemaker Robert Brittan, who became president when the winery was sold to Beringer Wine Estates in 1997.

The winery was sold to Beringer Wine Estates in 1997, which was purchased in 2000 by Foster's Brewing Group for $1.14 billion. Foster's wine business was named "Treasury Wine Estates" in 2010, spun off as a publicly traded company in 2011, and remains the owner of Stags' Leap.

Along with Baldacci Family Vineyards and others, Stags' Leap Winery is a member of the Stags Leap District Winery Association.

== See also ==
- California wine
