= National Register of Historic Places listings in Napa County, California =

Location of Napa County in California

This is a list of the National Register of Historic Places listings in Napa County, California.

This is intended to be a complete list of the properties and districts on the National Register of Historic Places in Napa County, California, United States. Latitude and longitude coordinates are provided for many National Register properties and districts; these locations may be seen together in an online map.

There are 88 properties and districts listed on the National Register in the county, including 1 National Historic Landmark.

This National Park Service list is complete through NPS recent listings posted September 11, 2026.

== Current listings ==
	Name on the Register	Image	Date listed	Location	City or town	Description
1	Aetna Springs Resort	Aetna Springs Resort	March 9, 1987 (#87000341)	1600 Aetna Springs Rd. 38°39′06″N 122°29′06″W	Pope Valley	
2	Alexandria Hotel and Annex	Alexandria Hotel and Annex	January 11, 1982 (#82002212)	840-844 Brown St. 38°17′54″N 122°17′02″W	Napa	
3	William Andrews House	William Andrews House	June 18, 1992 (#92000789)	741 Seminary St. 38°17′43″N 122°17′27″W	Napa	
4	Atkinson House	Atkinson House	September 13, 1990 (#90001443)	8440 St. Helena Hwy. 38°27′14″N 122°24′48″W	Rutherford	
5	Bale Mill	Bale Mill	June 22, 1972 (#72000240)	3 miles (4.8 km) northwest of St. Helena off CA 128; 38°32′29″N 122°30′30″W	St. Helena	
6	Bank of Napa	Bank of Napa	June 18, 1992 (#92000785)	903 Main St. and 908 Brown St. 38°17′57″N 122°17′05″W	Napa	
7	Beringer Brothers-Los Hermanos Winery	Beringer Brothers-Los Hermanos Winery	August 17, 2001 (#01000878)	2000 Main St. 38°30′41″N 122°28′46″W	St. Helena	
8	Sam Brannan Cottage	Sam Brannan Cottage	August 18, 1983 (#83001211)	109 Wapoo Ave. 38°34′56″N 122°34′34″W	Calistoga	
9	Buford House	Buford House	November 11, 1977 (#77000314)	1930 Clay St. 38°17′55″N 122°17′38″W	Napa	
10	Carneros Creek Bridge on Old Sonoma Road	Carneros Creek Bridge on Old Sonoma Road	August 5, 2005 (#05000779)	Old Sonoma Rd., 0.2 miles (0.32 km) northeast of CA 12/CA 121; 38°15′24″N 122°20′22″W	Napa	
11	Chateau Chevalier		June 12, 1987 (#87000926)	3101 Spring Mountain Rd. 38°30′53″N 122°30′35″W	St. Helena	
12	Chateau Pacheteau	Chateau Pacheteau	December 22, 2015 (#15000913)	1670 Diamond Mountain Rd. 38°33′50″N 122°34′45″W	Calistoga	
13	Churchill Manor	Churchill Manor	April 18, 1977 (#77000315)	485 Brown St. 38°17′35″N 122°16′59″W	Napa	
14	Thomas Earl House	Thomas Earl House	August 18, 1992 (#92000996)	1221 Seminary St. 38°17′58″N 122°17′24″W	Napa	
15	Elmshaven	Elmshaven	November 4, 1993 (#93001609)	125 Glass Mountain Ln. 38°32′13″N 122°28′41″W	St. Helena	
16	Eshcol Winery	Eshcol Winery	July 16, 1987 (#87001155)	1160 Oak Knoll Ave. 38°21′38″N 122°19′53″W	Napa	
17	Far Niente Winery	Far Niente Winery	February 28, 1979 (#79000507)	South of Oakville at 1577 Oakville Grade; 38°25′33″N 122°24′07″W	Oakville	
18	First National Bank	First National Bank	September 24, 1992 (#92001277)	1026 First St. 38°17′57″N 122°17′04″W	Napa	
19	First Presbyterian Church	First Presbyterian Church	June 5, 1975 (#75000446)	1333 3rd St. 38°17′46″N 122°17′09″W	Napa	
20	First Street Bridge	First Street Bridge	August 5, 2004 (#04000774)	First St. across the Napa R 38°18′06″N 122°16′42″W	Napa	
21	James H. Francis House	James H. Francis House	January 31, 1979 (#79000503)	1403 Myrtle St. 38°34′36″N 122°34′53″W	Calistoga	1886 home of a local merchant; Calistoga Hospital from 1918 to 1965
22	French Laundry	French Laundry	April 19, 1978 (#78000728)	6640 Washington St. 38°24′16″N 122°21′50″W	Yountville	
23	Garnett Creek Bridge on CA 29	Garnett Creek Bridge on CA 29	August 5, 2005 (#05000776)	CA 29 over Garnett Creek at postmile 39.08; 38°36′12″N 122°35′20″W	Calistoga	
24	Garnett Creek Bridge on Greenwood Avenue	Garnett Creek Bridge on Greenwood Avenue	August 5, 2005 (#05000778)	Greenwood Ave., 0.2 miles (0.32 km) northeast of Grant Ave. 38°35′34″N 122°35′29″W	Calistoga	
25	Goodman Library	Goodman Library	January 21, 1974 (#74000539)	1219 1st St. 38°17′53″N 122°17′10″W	Napa	
26	George E. Goodman Jr. House	George E. Goodman Jr. House	April 1, 1993 (#93000270)	492 Randolph St. 38°17′37″N 122°17′05″W	Napa	
27	George E. Goodman Mansion	George E. Goodman Mansion	April 15, 1993 (#93000261)	1120 Oak St. 38°17′37″N 122°16′56″W	Napa	
28	Gordon Building	Gordon Building	September 12, 1985 (#85002197)	1130 1st St. 38°17′56″N 122°17′09″W	Napa	
29	Greystone Cellars	Greystone Cellars	August 10, 1978 (#78000725)	2555 Main St. 38°30′52″N 122°29′02″W	St. Helena	Built in 1889 by William Bowers Bourn II to house Napa Valley's first wine cooperative; later owned and operated by the Christian Brothers and Heublein; now the Culinary Institute of America at Greystone
30	Groezinger Wine Cellars	Groezinger Wine Cellars	February 4, 1982 (#82002218)	6525 Washington St. 38°24′05″N 122°21′44″W	Yountville	
31	Hackett House	Hackett House	April 19, 1984 (#84000913)	2109 1st St. 38°17′50″N 122°17′43″W	Napa	
32	Hatt Building	Hatt Building	May 2, 1977 (#77000316)	5th and Main Sts. 38°17′46″N 122°16′54″W	Napa	
33	Helios Ranch	Helios Ranch	May 9, 1985 (#85001014)	1575 St. Helena Hwy. 38°28′37″N 122°26′07″W	St. Helena	1884 home of prominent Napa farmer and businessman Theron H. Ink; now the Ink House Bed and Breakfast
34	Dr. Edwin Hennessey House	Dr. Edwin Hennessey House	August 28, 1986 (#86001976)	1727 Main St. 38°18′16″N 122°17′21″W	Napa	1889 Queen Anne style home of early Napa County physician and surgeon Edwin Z. Hennessey; now the Hennessey House Bed and Breakfast
35	Cayetano Juarez Adobe	Cayetano Juarez Adobe	April 3, 2015 (#15000122)	376 Soscol Ave. 38°17′18″N 122°16′30″W	Napa	
36	Sam Kee Laundry Building	Sam Kee Laundry Building	October 1, 1974 (#74000540)	1245 Main St. 38°18′04″N 122°17′11″W	Napa	
37	Kreuzer Ranch		February 11, 1982 (#82002214)	167 Kreuzer Lane; 38°17′14″N 122°14′05″W	Napa	
38	Charles Krug Winery	Charles Krug Winery	November 8, 1974 (#74000542)	St. Helena Hwy. 38°31′03″N 122°28′49″W	St. Helena	
39	Larkmead Winery	Larkmead Winery	February 1, 1982 (#82002215)	Northwest of St. Helena at 1091 Larkmead Lane; 38°33′33″N 122°31′16″W	Calistoga	Building now owned by Frank Family Vineyards
40	Lisbon Winery	Lisbon Winery	March 1, 1979 (#79000505)	1720 Brown St. 38°18′14″N 122°17′20″W	Napa	1882 winery of Joseph A. Mateus (Matthews); now the home of the Jarvis Conservatory
41	Manasse Mansion	Manasse Mansion	November 14, 1978 (#78000723)	443 Brown St. 38°17′34″N 122°17′00″W	Napa	
42	Edward G. Manasse House	Edward G. Manasse House	April 15, 1993 (#93000271)	495 Coombs St. 38°17′37″N 122°17′02″W	Napa	
43	Maxwell Creek Bridge on Hardin Road	Maxwell Creek Bridge on Hardin Road	August 5, 2005 (#05000777)	Hardin Rd., 1.6 miles (2.6 km) southeast of Pope Canyon Rd. 38°36′05″N 122°22′15″W	Locoallomi	
44	Migliavacca House	Migliavacca House	March 30, 1978 (#78000724)	1475 4th St. 38°17′42″N 122°17′14″W	Napa	
45	Milliken Creek Bridge	Milliken Creek Bridge	August 5, 2004 (#04000775)	Trancas St. across Milliken Creek; 38°19′30″N 122°16′28″W	Napa	
46	Monte Vista and Diamond Mountain Vineyard		January 9, 2013 (#12001144)	2121 Diamond Mountain Rd. 38°32′37″N 122°34′48″W	Calistoga	
47	Mount View Hotel	Mount View Hotel	April 12, 1982 (#82002211)	1457 Lincoln Ave. 38°34′46″N 122°34′36″W	Calistoga	
48	Napa Abajo-Fuller Park Historic District	Napa Abajo-Fuller Park Historic District	February 19, 1997 (#97000042)	Roughly bounded by the Napa River, Pine, Jefferson, 3rd, 4th, and Division Sts. 38°17′38″N 122°17′12″W	Napa	
49	Napa County Courthouse Plaza	Napa County Courthouse Plaza	June 18, 1992 (#92000778)	Bounded by Coombs, Second, Brown and Third Sts. 38°17′51″N 122°17′04″W	Napa	
50	Napa County Infirmary		June 4, 2018 (#100002380)	2344 Old Sonoma Rd. 38°17′16″N 122°17′54″W	Napa	
51	Napa Opera House	Napa Opera House	October 25, 1973 (#73000414)	1018-1030 Main St. on E side 38°17′59″N 122°17′04″W	Napa	
52	Napa River Bridge on Zinfandel Lane	Napa River Bridge on Zinfandel Lane	August 5, 2005 (#05000781)	Zinfandel Ln., 1 mile (1.6 km) east of CA 29; 38°29′42″N 122°25′32″W	St. Helena	1913 stone arch bridge
53	Napa Valley Railroad Depot	Napa Valley Railroad Depot	April 18, 1977 (#77000313)	Lincoln Ave. and Fair Way; 38°34′48″N 122°34′38″W	Calistoga	
54	Nichelini Winery	Nichelini Winery	August 24, 1979 (#79000508)	East of St. Helena at 2950 Sage Canyon Rd; 38°29′57″N 122°17′33″W	St. Helena	
55	Noyes Mansion	Noyes Mansion	June 18, 1992 (#92000788)	1750 First St. 38°17′51″N 122°17′31″W	Napa	
56	Oakville Grocery	Oakville Grocery	July 22, 1993 (#93000664)	7856 St. Helena Hwy. 38°26′15″N 122°24′06″W	Oakville	
57	Old Napa Register Building	Old Napa Register Building	February 19, 1982 (#82002213)	1202 1st St. 38°17′56″N 122°17′10″W	Napa	
58	Judge Augustus C. Palmer House	Judge Augustus C. Palmer House	January 31, 1979 (#79000504)	1300 Cedar St. 38°34′39″N 122°34′46″W	Calistoga	
59	Capt. George Pinkham House	Capt. George Pinkham House	June 18, 1992 (#92000786)	529-531 Brown St. 38°17′39″N 122°16′57″W	Napa	
60	Pope Street Bridge	Pope Street Bridge	October 5, 1972 (#72000241)	Pope St., over the Napa River; 38°30′40″N 122°27′21″W	St. Helena	
61	John Ramos Sherry House-Depot Saloon	John Ramos Sherry House-Depot Saloon	August 30, 2007 (#07000849)	1468-1478 Railroad Ave. 38°30′25″N 122°28′14″W	St. Helena	
62	Rhine House	Rhine House	February 23, 1972 (#72000242)	2000 Main St. 38°30′37″N 122°29′25″W	St. Helena	
63	Charles Rovegno House	Charles Rovegno House	September 13, 1991 (#91001384)	6711 Washington St. 38°24′20″N 122°21′56″W	Yountville	
64	St. Helena Catholic Church	St. Helena Catholic Church	May 23, 1978 (#78000726)	Oak and Tainter Sts. 38°30′13″N 122°28′09″W	St. Helena	
65	St. Helena High School	St. Helena High School	May 22, 1978 (#78000727)	437 Main St. 38°29′51″N 122°27′38″W	St. Helena	
66	St. Helena Historic Commercial District	St. Helena Historic Commercial District	January 23, 1998 (#97001661)	Along Main St., between Adams and Spring Sts. 38°30′17″N 122°28′05″W	St. Helena	
67	St. Helena Public Cemetery		October 1, 2018 (#100002994)	2461 Spring St. 38°29′36″N 122°28′34″W	St. Helena	
68	St. Helena Public Library	St. Helena Public Library	January 19, 1979 (#79000509)	1360 Oak Ave. 38°30′16″N 122°28′11″W	St. Helena	
69	Saint Helena Southern Pacific Railroad Depot	Saint Helena Southern Pacific Railroad Depot	January 7, 1997 (#96001535)	Railroad Ave., northeast of the junction of Main St. and Madrona Ave. 38°30′27″N 122°28′13″W	St. Helena	Southern Pacific standard plan No. 18 two-story combination depot.
70	Schramsberg Vineyards	Schramsberg Vineyards	October 22, 1998 (#98001251)	1400 Schramsberg Rd. 38°33′11″N 122°32′20″W	Calistoga	
71	Semorile Building	Semorile Building	November 21, 1974 (#74000541)	975 1st St. 38°17′57″N 122°17′02″W	Napa	
72	Williams Smith House	Williams Smith House	June 30, 1995 (#95000786)	1929 First St. 38°17′51″N 122°17′38″W	Napa	Circa 1875 Second Empire-style house of late 19th-century Napa businessman Williams Smith
73	Special Internal Revenue Bonded Warehouse, First District, No. 13	Special Internal Revenue Bonded Warehouse, First District, No. 13	October 5, 1995 (#95001154)	1216 Church St. 38°30′17″N 122°27′58″W	St. Helena	
74	Suscol House	Suscol House	February 28, 1979 (#79000506)	South of Napa on Old Suscol Ferry Rd. 38°14′24″N 122°16′06″W	Napa	
75	Swartz Creek Bridge on Aetna Springs Road	Swartz Creek Bridge on Aetna Springs Road	August 5, 2005 (#05000780)	Aetna Springs Rd., 0.8 miles (1.3 km) west of Pope Valley Rd. 38°39′12″N 122°28′32″W	Aetna Springs	
76	Taylor, Duckworth and Company Foundry Building	Taylor, Duckworth and Company Foundry Building	January 21, 1982 (#82002216)	1345 Railroad Ave. 38°30′18″N 122°28′05″W	St. Helena	
77	Charles Trower House		July 21, 2023 (#100009160)	1042 Seminary St. 38°17′52″N 122°17′27″W	Napa	
78	Alfred L. Tubbs Winery	Alfred L. Tubbs Winery	January 30, 2013 (#12001235)	1429 Tubbs Ln. 38°36′07″N 122°35′51″W	Calistoga	now Chateau Montelena Winery
79	US Post Office-Napa Franklin Station	US Post Office-Napa Franklin Station	January 11, 1985 (#85000133)	1352 2nd St. 38°17′56″N 122°17′15″W	Napa	
80	Veterans Home of California Chapel	Veterans Home of California Chapel	February 13, 1979 (#79000510)	CA 29; 38°23′31″N 122°21′50″W	Yountville	
81	John Lee Webber House	John Lee Webber House	January 19, 1982 (#82002219)	6610 Webber St. 38°24′16″N 122°21′46″W	Yountville	Now the Lavender Bed and Breakfast
82	J.C. Weinberger Winery	J.C. Weinberger Winery	April 6, 2015 (#15000124)	2849 St. Helena Hwy. 38°31′06″N 122°29′25″W	St. Helena	Now the William Cole Vineyard
83	William Tell Saloon and Hotel	William Tell Saloon and Hotel	May 7, 1982 (#82002217)	1228 Spring St. 38°30′13″N 122°28′03″W	St. Helena	
84	Winship-Smernes Building	Winship-Smernes Building	July 29, 1977 (#77000317)	948 Main St. 38°17′57″N 122°17′02″W	Napa	
85	Capt. N. H. Wulff House	Capt. N. H. Wulff House	August 18, 1992 (#92000994)	549 Brown St. 38°17′41″N 122°16′56″W	Napa	
86	York House		May 3, 2016 (#16000209)	1005 Jefferson St. 38°17′52″N 122°17′37″W	Napa	
87	Eliza G. Yount House	Eliza G. Yount House	September 24, 1992 (#92001279)	423 Seminary St. 38°17′29″N 122°17′28″W	Napa	
88	Yountville Grammar School		June 14, 2016 (#16000356)	6550 Yount St. 38°24′13″N 122°21′43″W	Yountville	

== Former listing ==
	Name on the Register	Image	Date listed	Date removed	Location	City or town	Description
1	Behlow Building	Behlow Building	October 25, 1973 (#73002251)	February 17, 1977	2nd and Brown Sts.	Napa	Demolished in 1977.

== See also ==
- List of National Historic Landmarks in California
- National Register of Historic Places listings in California
- California Historical Landmarks in Napa County, California
