= Atkinson House =

Atkinson House or Atkinson Hall are the name of buildings in the United States, and may refer to:

(by state then city)

- Atkinson-Williams Warehouse, Fort Smith, Arkansas, listed on the National Register of Historic Places (NRHP) in Sebastian County
- Atkinson House (Rutherford, California), listed on the NRHP in Napa County
- Atkinson House (San Francisco, California), or Atkinson-Escher House, listed as a SFDL
- Atkinson Hall, Georgia College, Milledgeville, Georgia, listed on the NRHP in Baldwin County
- Atkinson Hall (Geneseo, Illinois), listed on the NRHP in Henry County
- Samuel Josiah Atkinson House, Siloam, North Carolina, listed on the NRHP in Surry County
- Atkinson-Smith House, Smithfield, North Carolina, listed on the NRHP in Johnston County
- W. H. Atkinson House, Ashland, Oregon, listed on the NRHP listings in Jackson County
- Atkinson House (Georgetown, Texas), listed on the NRHP in Williamson County
- Atkinson-Morris House, Paris, Texas, listed on the NRHP in Lamar County
- James and Hannah Atkinson House, Woods Cross, Utah, listed on the NRHP in Davis County
