= Webber House =

Webber House may refer to:

Australia

- Webber House, Brisbane, a heritage-listed building within the grounds of St John's Cathedral

United States of America

- John Lee Webber House, Yountville, California, listed on the National Register of Historic Places (NRHP) in Napa County, California
- Pioneer Park (Aspen, Colorado) or Henry Webber House, NRHP-listed
- Lovell-Webber House, Ionia, Michigan, listed on the NRHP in Ionia County, Michigan
- Webber House (Houston, Texas), NRHP-listed
- Samuel H. Webber House, Houston, Texas, listed on the NRHP in Harris County, Texas

== See also ==
- Weber House (disambiguation)
