= William Corlett (disambiguation) =

William Corlett (1938–2005) was an English children's author.

William Corlett may also refer to:

- William H. Corlett (1856–1937), American architect
- William Wellington Corlett (1842–1890), U.S. Delegate from the Wyoming Territory
