= Weber House =

Weber House may refer to:

in the United States

(by state)

- Weber House (Russell, Arkansas), listed on the National Register of Historic Places (NRHP) in Arkansas
- Peter J. Weber House, local landmark in Riverside, California
- Robert Weber Round Barn, Durand, Illinois, NRHP-listed
- Howard K. Weber House, Springfield, Illinois, listed on the NRHP in Illinois
- Weber House (Guttenberg, Iowa), listed on the NRHP in Iowa
- Alois and Annie Weber House, Keokuk, Iowa, NRHP-listed
- John Weber Farm, Camp Springs, Kentucky, listed on the NRHP in Kentucky
- Martin Weber House, Saint Paul, Minnesota, NRHP-listed
- Weber-Weaver Farm, West Lampeter, Pennsylvania, NRHP-listed
- Weber-Schuchert House, Victoria, Texas, listed on the NRHP in Texas
- Jacob Weber House, Wisconsin Dells, Wisconsin, listed on the NRHP in Wisconsin

== See also ==
- Webber House (disambiguation)
