= Atkinson Hall =

Atkinson Hall may refer to:

- Atkinson Hall, Georgia College, Milledgeville, Georgia
- Atkinson Hall (Geneseo, Illinois)
- Atkinson Hall at Calit2, University of California, San Diego
