= Gil Nickel =

Vintner

- Born: Harold Gilliland Nickel; 1939; Muskogee, Oklahoma, US
- Died: October 30, 2003 (aged 64); Oakville, California, US
- Education: Oklahoma State University; University of California, Davis
- Occupation: Vintner
- Spouse: Beth Nickel
- Children: 1

Gil Nickel (1939 – October 30, 2003) was an American vintner. He was the owner of the historic Far Niente Winery in the Napa Valley. He also established the Dolce Winery and the Nickel & Nickel Winery.

== Early life ==
Harold Gilliland Nickel was born in 1939 in Muskogee, Oklahoma. He graduated from Oklahoma State University in 1961, where he received a Bachelor of Science degree in Physics and Mathematics. He then served in the Oklahoma Air National Guard, serving one tour of duty during the Vietnam War.

== Career ==
He started his career by working as a missile analyst for the United States Navy Laboratory in Corona, California. He then moved back to his home state of Oklahoma, where he worked at Greenleaf Nursery, one of North America's largest wholesale nursery growers, founded in 1945, which was owned by his family and based in Tahlequah. He worked alongside his father and brother, later taking turns with his brother managing the business as he developed his Californian vineyard.

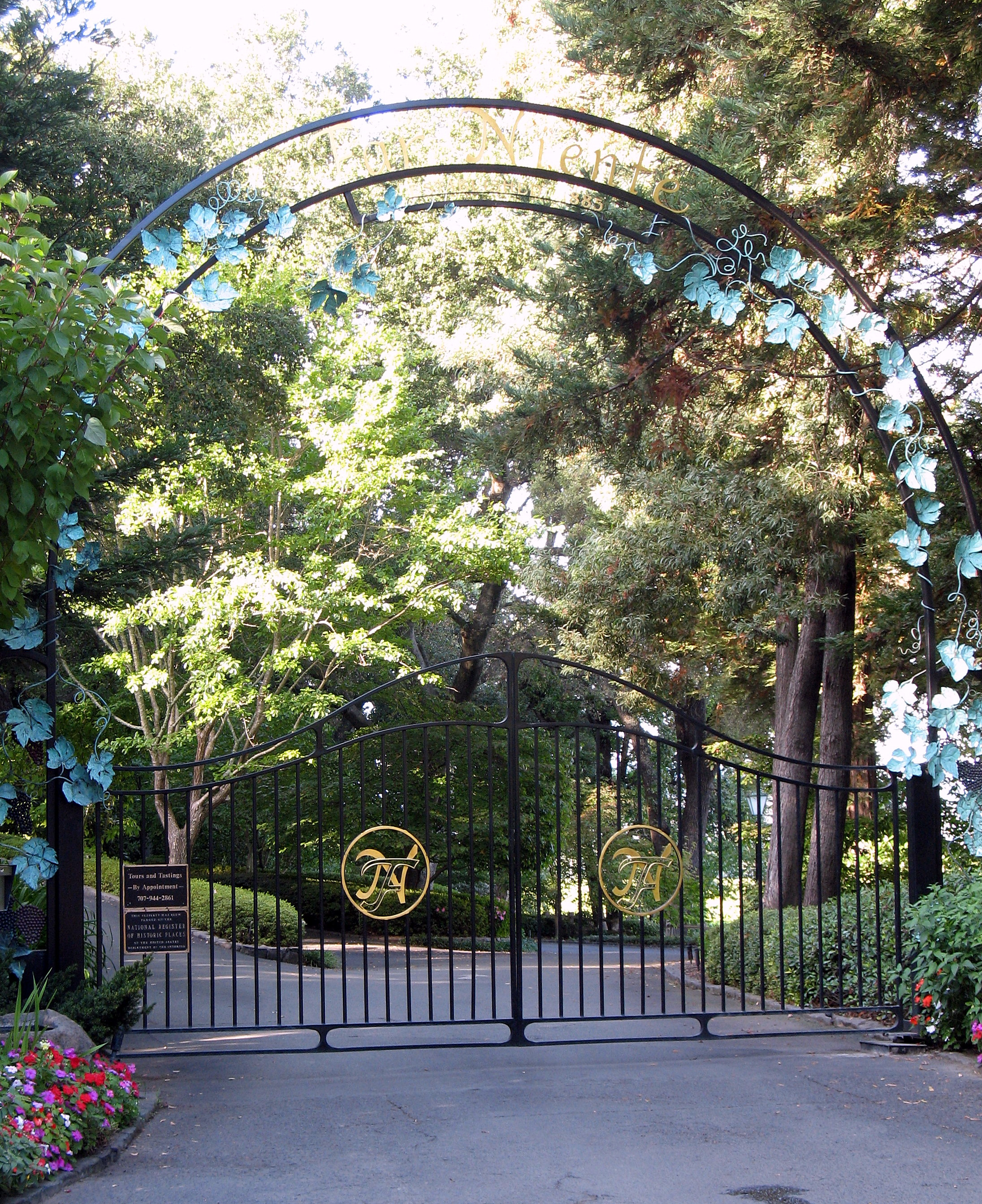
Far Niente Winery in Oakville, California.

In 1976, he moved back to California, where he audited classes in oenology at the University of California, Davis. He also studied oenology in France. In 1979, he purchased the historic Far Niente Winery in Oakville, which had been established in 1885 by John Benson, a '49er of the Californian gold rush and uncle of the famous American impressionist painter Winslow Homer. The winery was in disrepair having been abandoned 60 years previously during Prohibition and Nickel spent three years restoring it, including the impressive caves, carved out of solid rock, which he repaired and extended to 40,000 sq ft using a 22-foot English electric-hydraulic drill previously used in coal mines. The caves are now listed on the National Register of Historic Places. Three years later Far Niente pressed its first harvest in six decades.

In 1992, he started the Dolce Winery, which produced late-harvest dessert wine. With his son, Jeremy Nickel, he started Nickel & Nickel Winery in 1996. The business produced wines from the same vineyard as opposed to blends.

== Personal life ==
He was married to Susan Nickel. They had a son.. At the time of his death, he was married to Beth Nickel. A talented amateur vintage car racer, Gil competed internationally and won the FIA European Historic Sportscar Championship in 2000 in his 1964 Lotus 26R. His extensive collection of classic cars is on display at Far Niente.

== Death ==
Nickel died of cancer on October 30, 2003, in Oakville, California.

== Legacy ==
- In 2011, his son Jeremy sued the other owners of the Far Niente Winery for alleged misconduct.
- The Gil Nickel Humanitarian Award given by the Jonsson Cancer Center Foundation at the University of California, Los Angeles is named in his honor.
