= Buford House =

Buford House may refer to:

- Harry Buford House, a designated landmark in North Omaha, Nebraska
- Buford House (Napa, California), listed on the National Register of Historic Places

== See also ==
- Burford House (disambiguation)
