= William H. Corlett =

American architect (1856–1937)

William Henry Corlett
- Born: 1856; Isle of Man
- Died: October 7, 1937 (aged 80–81); Napa, California, United States
- Burial place: Tulocay Cemetery, Napa, California, United States
- Other name: W. H. Corlett
- Occupations: Architect, contractor
- Spouse: Cassie Eunice Greenfield (m. 1886–1936; death)

William Henry Corlett (1856 – October 7, 1937), also known as W. H. Corlett, was an American architect and contractor, active in Napa County, California and the surrounding area. Several buildings and residences he designed are listed on the National Register of Historic Places.

Corlett was born in 1856 in Isle of Man; he immigrated to the United States in 1873, after the death of his mother. Corlett died at his home in Napa, California, on October 7, 1937, aged 81.

== Work ==
Works include (with attribution):

- Alexandria Hotel and Annex, 840-844 Brown St., Napa, California; (Corlett, William H.), NRHP-listed
- Downtown Oakland Historic District, roughly along Broadway from 17th to 11th St., Oakland, California; (Reed & Corlett), NRHP-listed
- Manasse Mansion (1886), 443 Brown St., Napa, California; (Corlett, W.H.), NRHP-listed
- Migliavacca House, Division St., Napa, California; NRHP-listed
- Napa Abajo-Fuller Park Historic District, roughly bounded by the Napa River, Pine, Jefferson, 3rd, 4th, and Division Sts., Napa, California; (Corlett, William H.), NRHP-listed
- Napa County Courthouse Plaza, bounded by Coombs, Second, Brown and Third Sts., Napa, California; (Corlett, William H.), NRHP-listed
- Noyes Mansion, 1750 First St., Napa, California; (Corlett, William H.), NRHP-listed
- Palm House, 1543 Main St. (southwest corner of Main and Vallejo Sts.), Napa, California; (Corlett, William H.)
- St. Helena Carnegie Library, 1360 Oak Ave. St. Helena, California; (Corlett, William), NRHP-listed
- US Post Office-Napa Franklin Station, 1352 2nd St., Napa, California; (Corlett, William H.; Reed & Corlett), NRHP-listed
- Capt. N. H. Wulff House, 549 Brown St., Napa, California; (Corlett, William H.), NRHP-listed
