= Far Niente Winery =

Winery in Oakville, California, US

Coordinates: 38.4258°N 122.4031°W

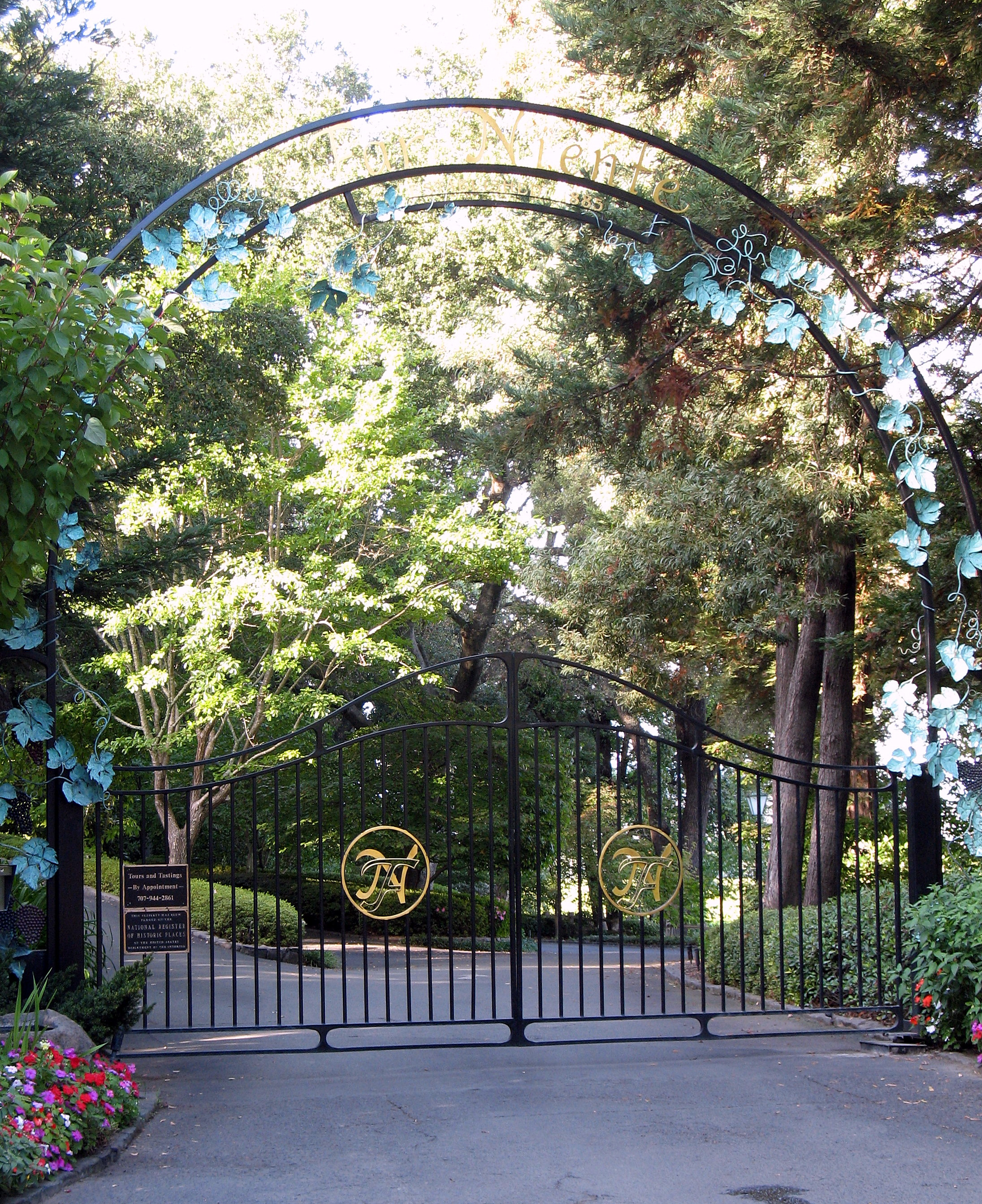
Entrance to Far Niente Winery

Far Niente Winery is a winery based in Oakville, California, located within the Oakville AVA appellation. It was founded in 1885 by John Benson, but abandoned during Prohibition in 1919. The property was restored by Gil Nickel in 1979. The winery now produces wines from Cabernet Sauvignon and Chardonnay.

The name of the winery comes from the Italian phrase dolce far niente, meaning "the sweetness of doing nothing". It has been listed on the National Register of Historic Places.

In 2016, private equity firm GI Partners purchased a majority stake in Far Niente Wine Estates, which included the Far Niente winery as well as the brands Nickel & Nickel, EnRoute, Bella Union, and Dolce.
