= Burford House =

Burford House may refer to:

- The Burford House Hotel at Burford
- Burford House, Windsor, Nell Gwyn's house, Berkshire, England
- Burford House, Shropshire
- Burford House (New Hampshire)

== See also ==
- Buford House (disambiguation)
