= Luther M. Turton =

American architect

Luther M. Turton (May 22, 1862 - April 27, 1925) was an architect in Napa, California. A number of his works are listed on the National Register of Historic Places.

His full name was Luther Mark Turton.

He was born in North Bend, Nebraska.

His works in Napa include:

- Semorile Building (1888), 975 1st St., NRHP-listed,
- Hackett House (1889), 2109 1st St.
- William Andrews House, 741 Seminary St.
- Goodman Library, 1219 1st St.
- Old Napa Register Building, 1202 1st St.
- Winship-Smernes Building, 948 Main St.
- H. Schulz block
- Behlow block
- Miglavacca block
- numerous residences in Napa
- One or more works in Napa Abajo-Fuller Park Historic District.

Also, outside of Napa, he designed:

- St. Helena Union High School, St. Helena
- two bank buildings in Vallejo, California .
- a business block which was built in San Francisco, designed with Henry Brown of Napa

and he also designed buildings in Coluso, Yolo and Solano counties.

He was also superintendent of construction on several buildings, including the Bank of Napa building, the First National Bank building in Napa, and two grammar school buildings.
