= Nichelini Family Winery =

Nichelini Family Winery is a family-owned winery located in the Chiles Valley District of Napa Valley in California. It is the oldest winery in Napa to have been in the same family's hands since its founding, by winemaker Anton Nichelini in 1890, and is listed on the National Register of Historic Places. Its 1886 Homestead Cabin, also on the property and recently restored, is believed to be the only one of its kind remaining in Napa County, and as such was recently placed on the Napa Valley Historical Society's "10 Treasures" list. The winery is currently collectively owned and operated by the descendants of Anton and Caterina Nichelini.

Nichelini Family Winery only produces about 2500 cases of wine a year, made by current head winemaker Aimée Sunseri, who is the seventh family winemaker in succession. Its wines include Zinfandel, Petite Sirah, Primitivo, Cabernet Sauvignon, Merlot, Sauvignon Blanc, Sémillon and Muscadelle (formerly titled Sauvignon Vert), among others.

Nichelini Family Winery is located at 2950 Sage Canyon Road (State Hwy. 128), St. Helena, CA, 94574.

== History ==
Anton Nichelini (1862-1937) was born in Verscio, Canton Ticino, Switzerland. He came to California in 1882 at the age of 19, where he first settled in Glen Ellen (Sonoma Cty.) and became a winemaker and grape grower for pioneer winemaker Joshua Chauvet. Two years later Anton homesteaded a 160-acre tract of rugged wilderness in Chiles Valley, converting about 30 acres to vineyards, and becoming the first Swiss settler in the area.

In 1890 Anton married Caterina Corda (1869–1952), another Swiss immigrant from Ticino, and shortly thereafter they moved out of their tiny homestead cabin and into the Greek Revival style house that Anton constructed on top of his stone winery. Mr. Nichelini was also a skilled miner, and patented new smelting techniques. His property in Chiles Valley was unusually rich in chromium and magnesite deposits, and he mined these for several years in addition to his ranching and wine production business.

Anton and Caterina eventually had twelve children between the years of 1891 and 1916, all of whom attended school at the Chiles Valley one-room schoolhouse. Their children were: William, Joseph, Josephine, Ida ("Edith"), Rose, Catherine, Mary, Frederic, Allen, Emma ("Virginia"), Antoinette, and Inez. The winery today is collectively owned and operated by the descendants of these twelve children.

=== Prohibition and Post-Prohibition ===
The Nichelini Winery "officially" closed during the years of Prohibition. However, the winery was well known in the area as a source of bootleg wine, even supplying the governor's household. In 1920, a man named Clifford Clark wrote a letter to the sheriff complaining about rowdy drunken behavior in the nearby town of Monticello, citing locals having "good times, drinking wine", and that there was "no question, but what the wine comes from Nichelini's". After a warning fine was issued in 1923, Anton was finally arrested on January 8, 1924, and taken to the St. Helena jail. Despite the arrest, the Nichelini family continued to surreptitiously supply wine to local miners and Bay Area residents, sometimes through the cover of a sacramental wine delivery service.

Nichelini Winery was officially reopened by Anton's son William Nichelini after the repeal of the Volstead Act. Nichelini family winemakers in succession, following Anton and William Nichelini, have been: James Nichelini, Jo-Ann Nichelini (Meyer), Gregory Boeger, Justin Boeger, and Aimée Sunseri. Aimée Sunseri was named the Woman Winemaker of the Year at the 2017 International Women's Wine Competition.
