= Alexandria Hotel and Annex =

- U.S. National Register of Historic Places
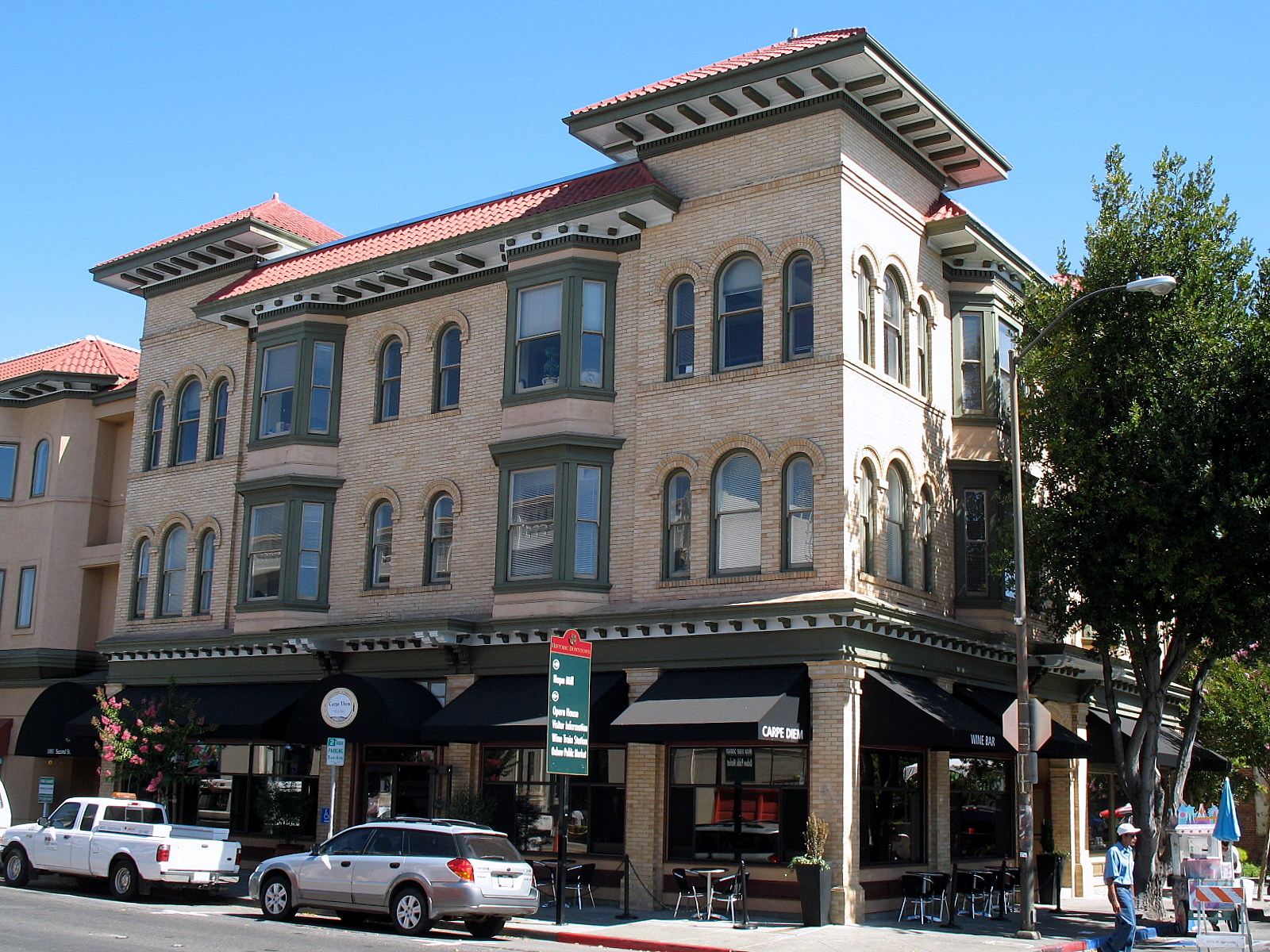

- Location within California Location within the United States
- Location: 840-844 Brown St., Napa, California
- Coordinates: 38°17′54″N 122°17′2″W
- Area: 0.2 acres (0.081 ha)
- Built: 1910
- Architect: Corlett, William H.
- Architectural style: Mission Revival, Mission-Mediterranean
- NRHP reference No.: 82002212
- Added to NRHP: January 11, 1982

The Alexandria Hotel and Annex, also known as Plaza Hotel and Annex, is located at 840-844 Brown St. in Napa, California. Built in 1910, the hotel was a work of architect William H. Corlett. The hotel's design exemplifies the Mission Revival and Mediterranean Revival styles, which were both popular in California in the early 20th century. The design features three square towers on the street facing corners, overhanging eaves, and both slanted bay and rounded windows. The hotel's annex is older than the hotel and was redesigned to match the hotel's architecture when the hotel was built.

The hotel was listed on the National Register of Historic Places in 1982. The listing included two contributing buildings, the hotel and its annex.

== 2014 Napa Valley earthquake ==
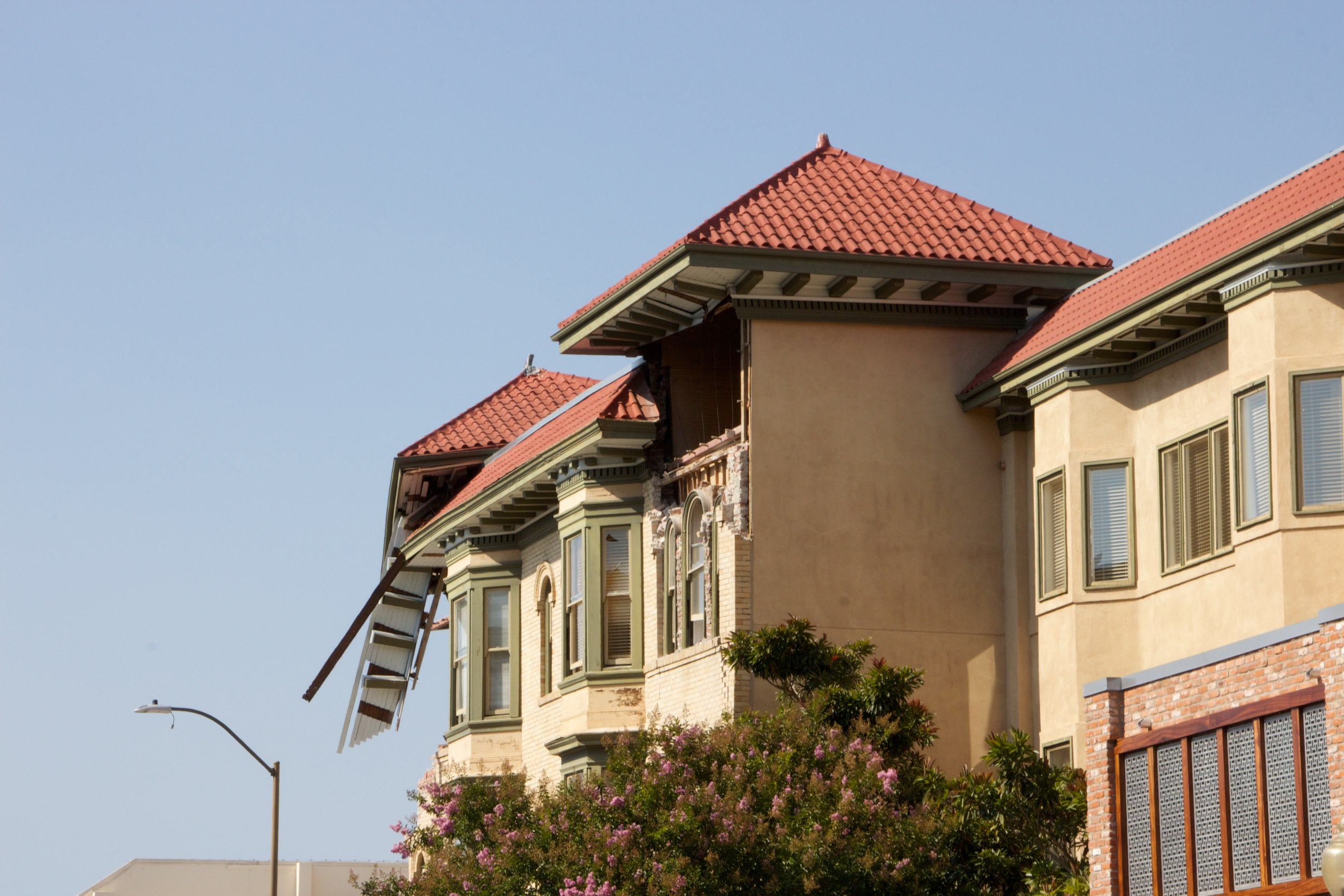
Damage from South Napa quake

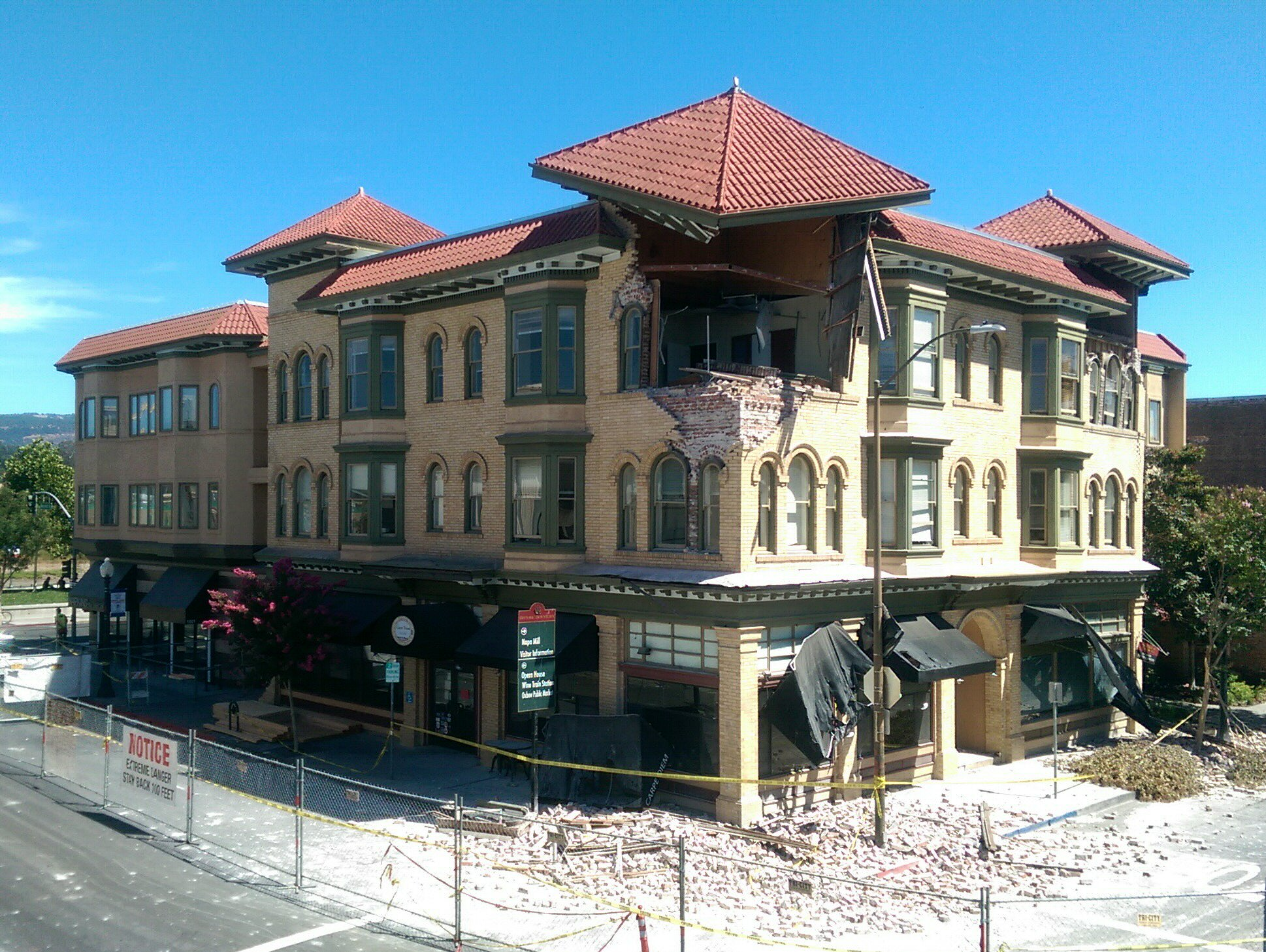
Earthquake damaged Alexandria Square building

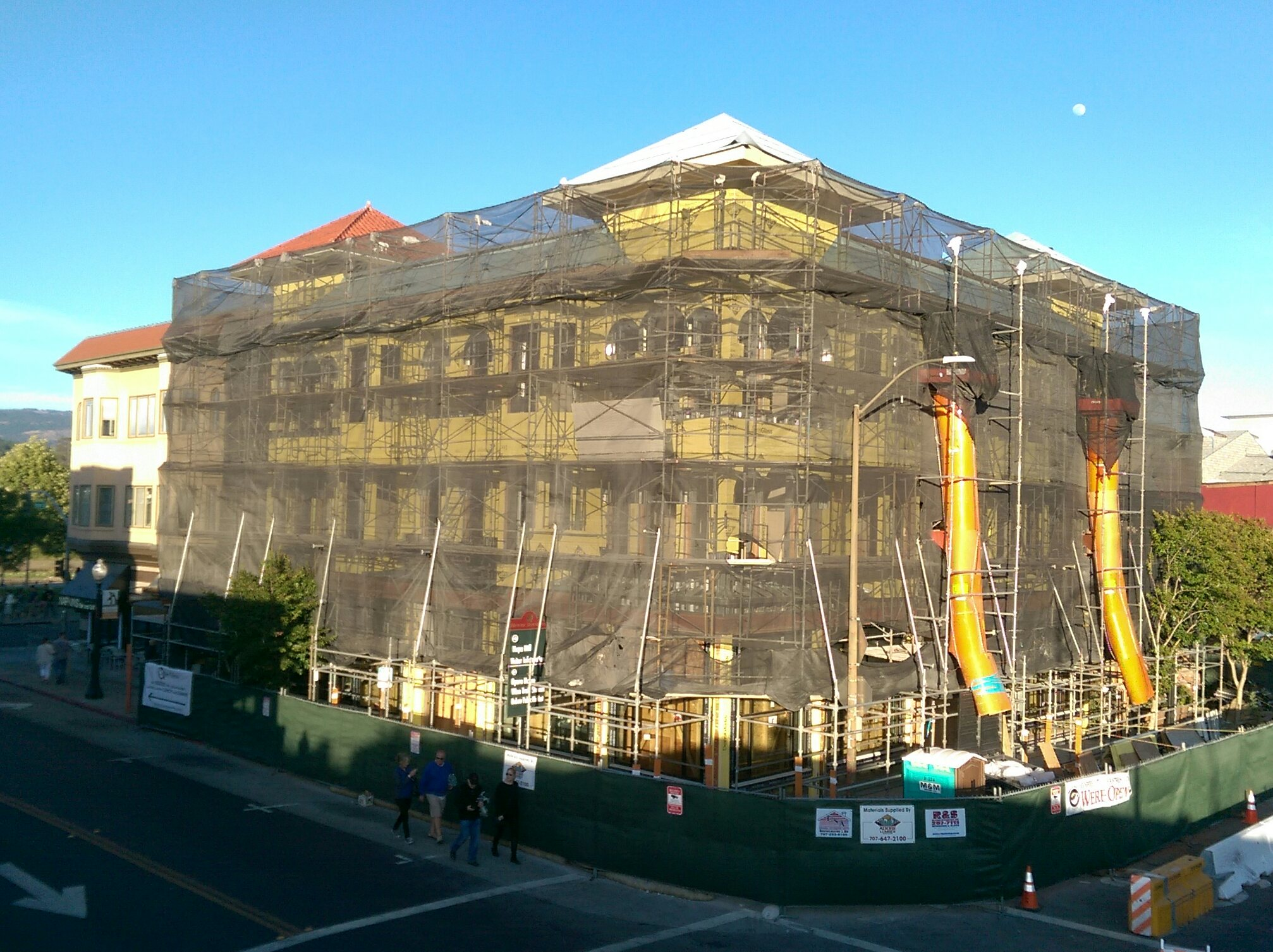
Renovations underway in May 2015

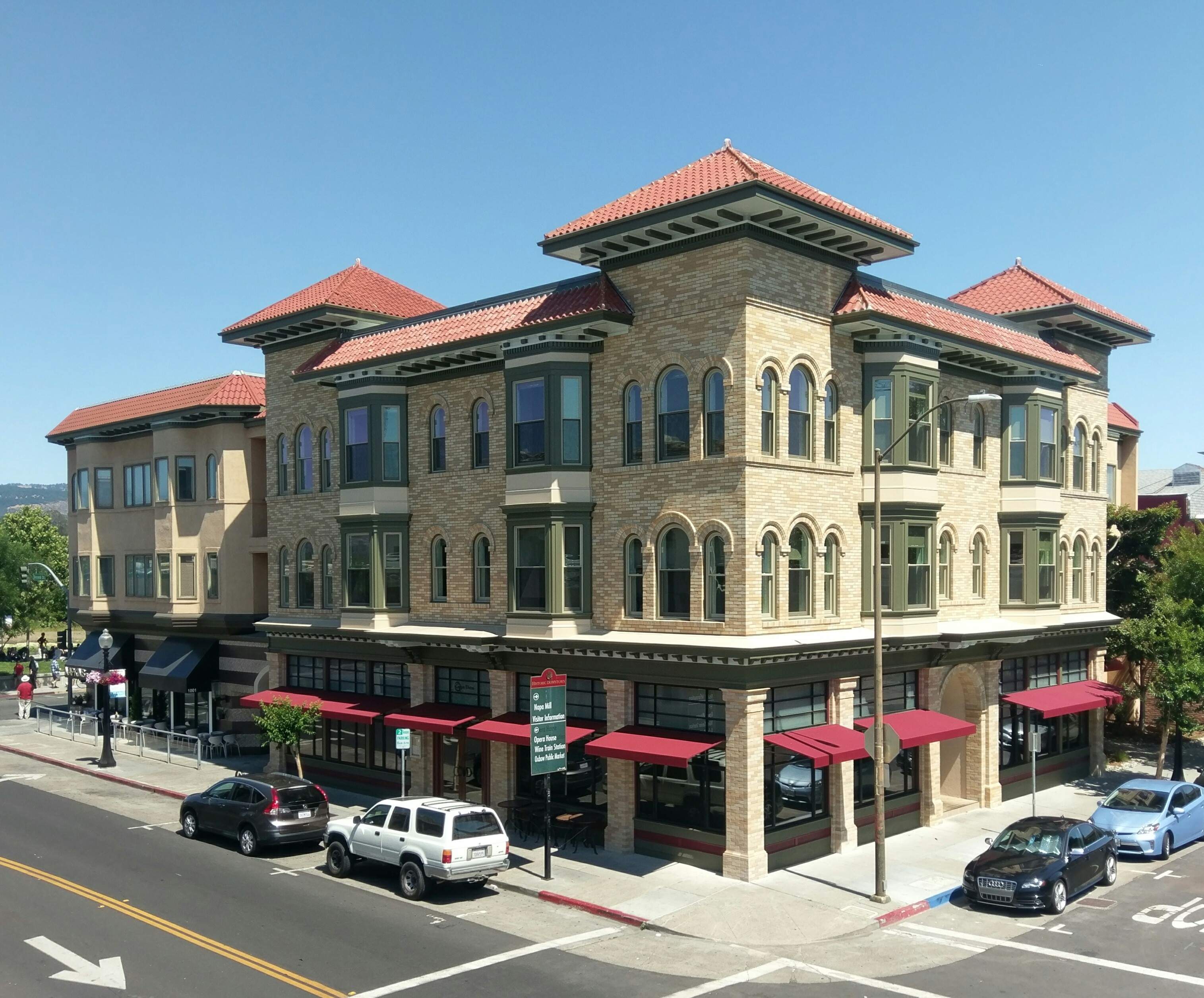
Renovations completed in June 2016

The building was damaged by the 2014 South Napa earthquake, and has been renovated.
