= James and Hannah Atkinson House =

Historic house in Utah, United States

- U.S. National Register of Historic Places
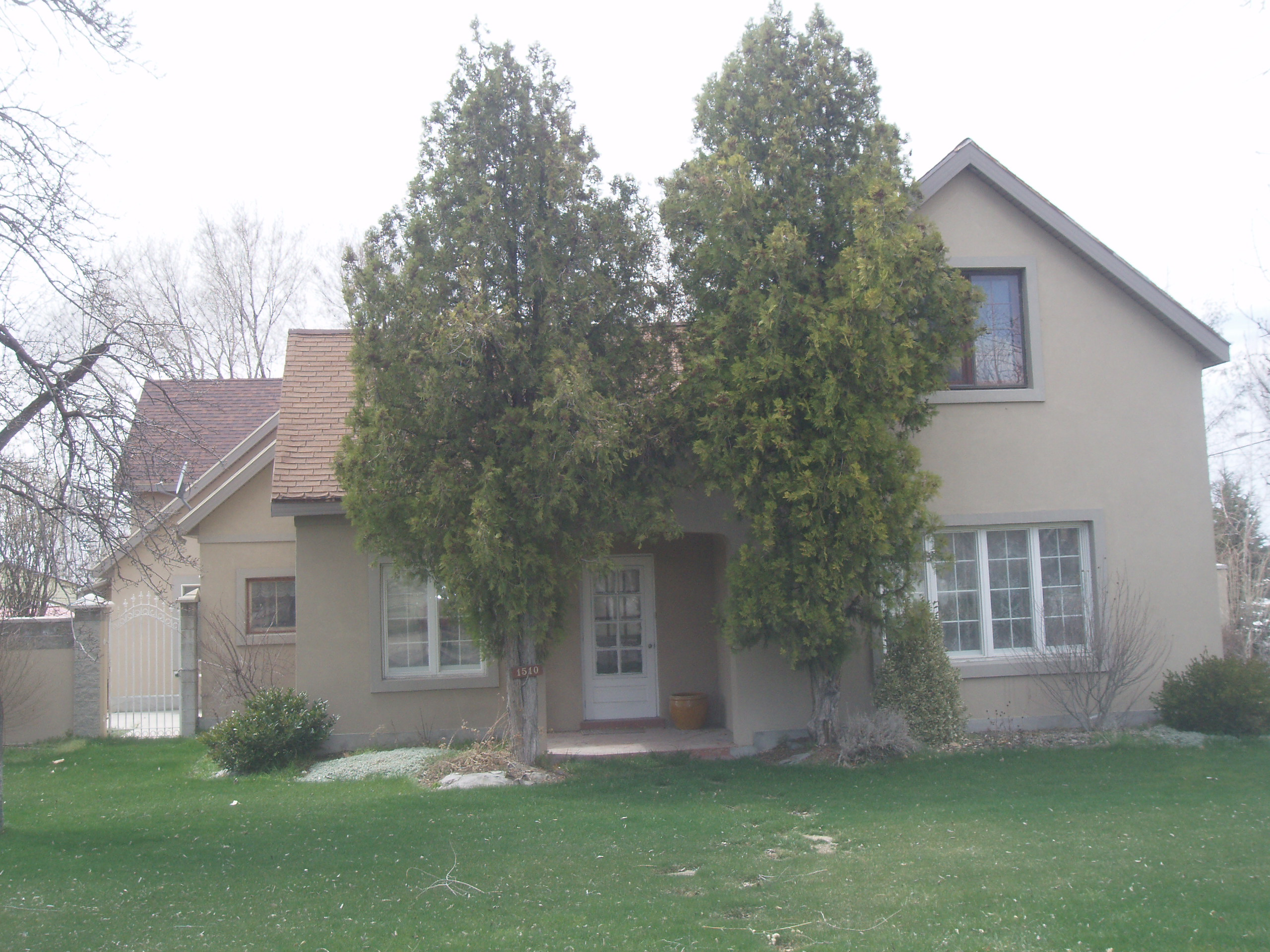

- Location within Utah Location within the United States
- Location: 1510 S. 1100 W, Woods Cross, Utah
- Coordinates: 40°52′29″N 111°54′40″W
- Area: 1.6 acres (0.65 ha)
- Built: 1870
- Built by: Atkinson, James Isaac; Atkinson, William
- Architectural style: Tudor Revival
- NRHP reference No.: 99000847
- Added to NRHP: July 15, 1999

The James and Hannah Atkinson House is a historic house located at 1510 South 1100 West in Woods Cross, Utah,

== Description and history ==
It was built around 1870 and was modified later, in c.1875, c.1900, and c.1935. Its 1999 National Register of Historic Places nomination asserted its significance for reflecting several historical styles, with alterations of a historic era preserved and not modified in modern times. It is also significant for association with James Atkinson, a builder and brickyard owner, a raiser of livestock, and organizer of the Deseret Livestock Company.

It was listed on the National Register of Historic Places on July 15, 1999.
