= Eliza G. Yount House =

- U.S. National Register of Historic Places
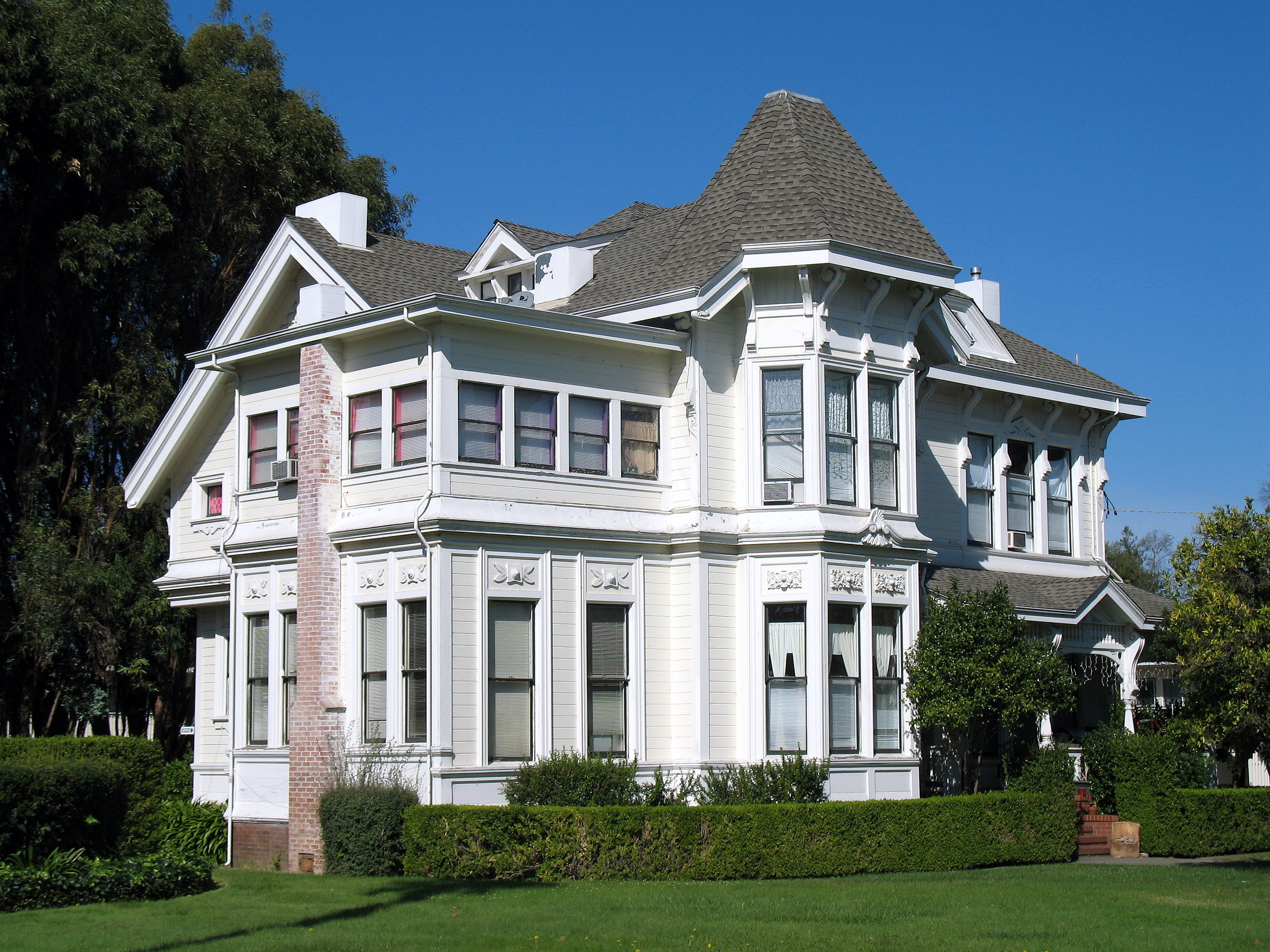

- Location within California
- Location: 423 Seminary St., Napa, California
- Coordinates: 38°17′29″N 122°17′28″W
- Area: less than one acre
- Built: 1884
- Architect: John M. Curtis
- Architectural style: Late Victorian
- NRHP reference No.: 92001279
- Added to NRHP: September 24, 1992

The Eliza G. Yount House, at 423 Seminary St. in Napa, California, was built in 1884. It was listed on the National Register of Historic Places in 1992.
