= Old Napa Register Building =

- U.S. National Register of Historic Places
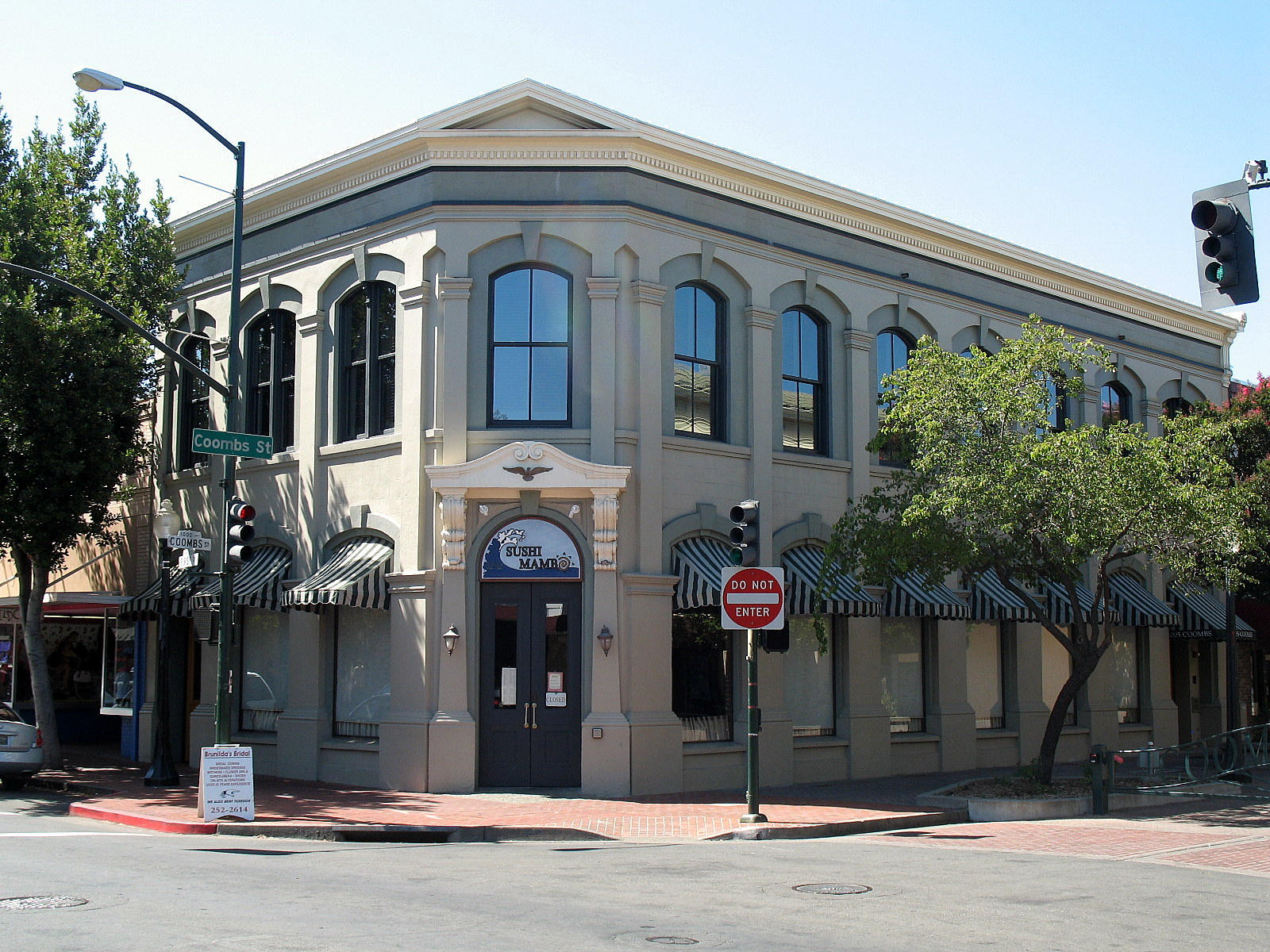
- Photo from 2010

- Location within California
- Location: 1202 1st St., Napa, California
- Coordinates: 38°17′56″N 122°17′10″W
- Area: 0.6 acres (0.24 ha)
- Built: 1905
- Architect: Turton, L.M.
- NRHP reference No.: 82002213
- Added to NRHP: February 19, 1982

The Old Napa Register Building, at 1202 1st St. in Napa, California, was built in 1905. It was listed on the National Register of Historic Places in 1982.

The Napa Register, founded in 1863 as a weekly, is Napa County's largest newspaper. It began daily publication in 1872. George Milton Francis became sole owner and publisher in 1876 and ran it until the 1920s when his son, George R. Francis, took over.

To erect the building, Francis bought the property at Coombs and First Streets in 1904, when it was relatively far from the downtown, and was reportedly advised that was a poor idea. However other businesses followed and the direction of Napa's commercial development switched from north–south along Main St. to east–west along First.

It was designed by architect L.M. Turton.

In early years, the second floor was leased as a dance studio.
