= Napa County Courthouse Plaza =

- U.S. National Register of Historic Places
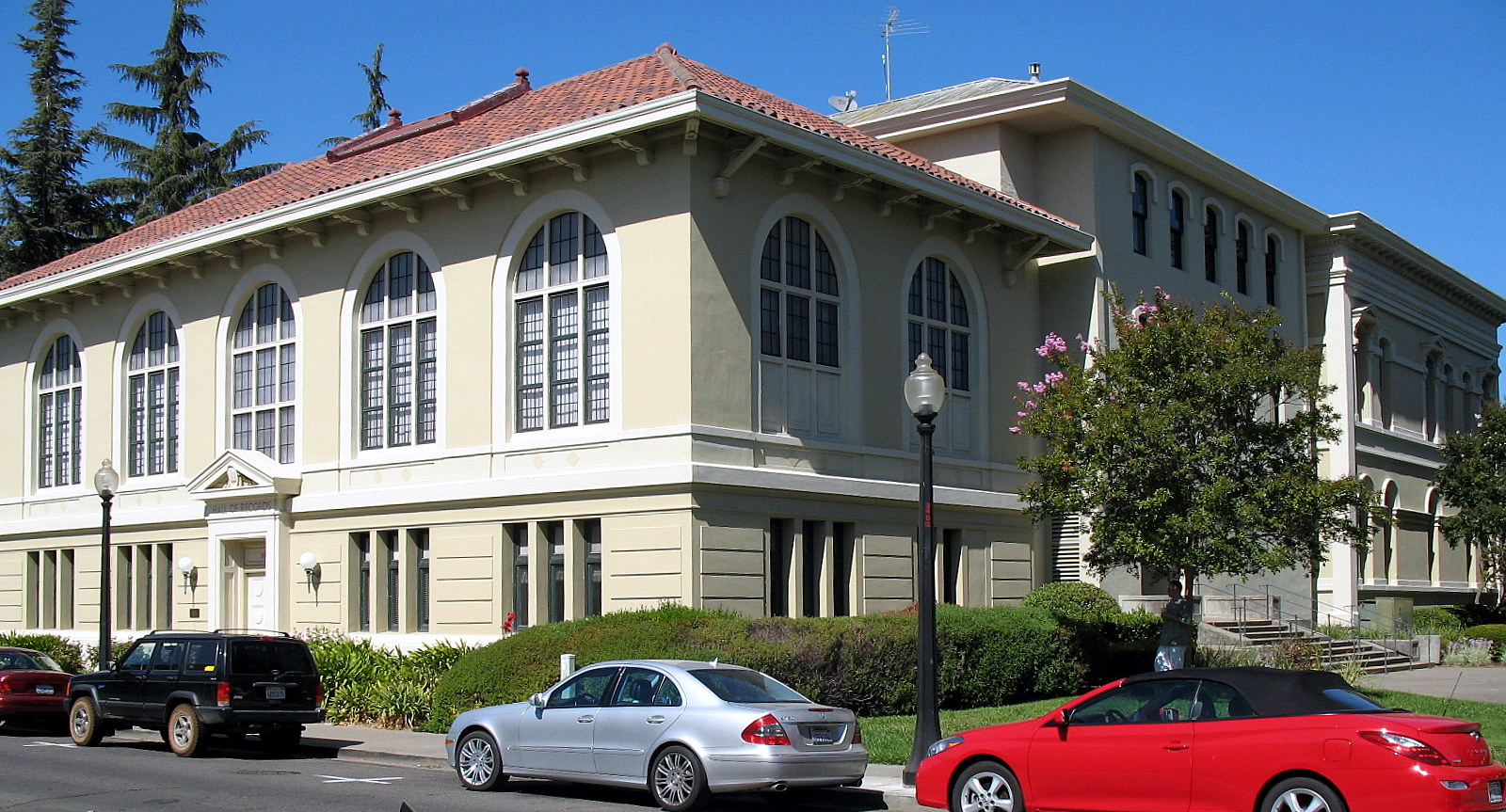
- The Hall of Records, with the courthouse in the background

- Location within California Location within the United States
- Location: Bounded by Coombs, Second, Brown and Third Sts., Napa, California
- Coordinates: 38°17′51″N 122°17′4″W
- Area: 1.3 acres (0.53 ha)
- Built: 1878 (courthouse), 1916 (Hall of Records)
- Architect: William H. Corlett (Hall of Records)
- Architectural style: Renaissance, High Victorian Italianate (courthouse)
- NRHP reference No.: 92000778
- Added to NRHP: June 18, 1992

The Napa County Courthouse Plaza is a complex in Napa, California, which consists of the Napa County Courthouse and the Hall of Records. The two buildings occupy an entire city block, which includes open areas and landscaping to create the site's plaza setting. The High Victorian Italianate courthouse was built in 1878 to replace the original 1856 courthouse. The courthouse continues to serve as the seat of Napa County government. The 1916 Hall of Records is a federally sponsored records building designed by William H. Corlett. The Renaissance Revival building represents an early use of reinforced concrete as a building material; the material became popular nationwide in the 1920s.

The plaza was added to the National Register of Historic Places on June 18, 1992.

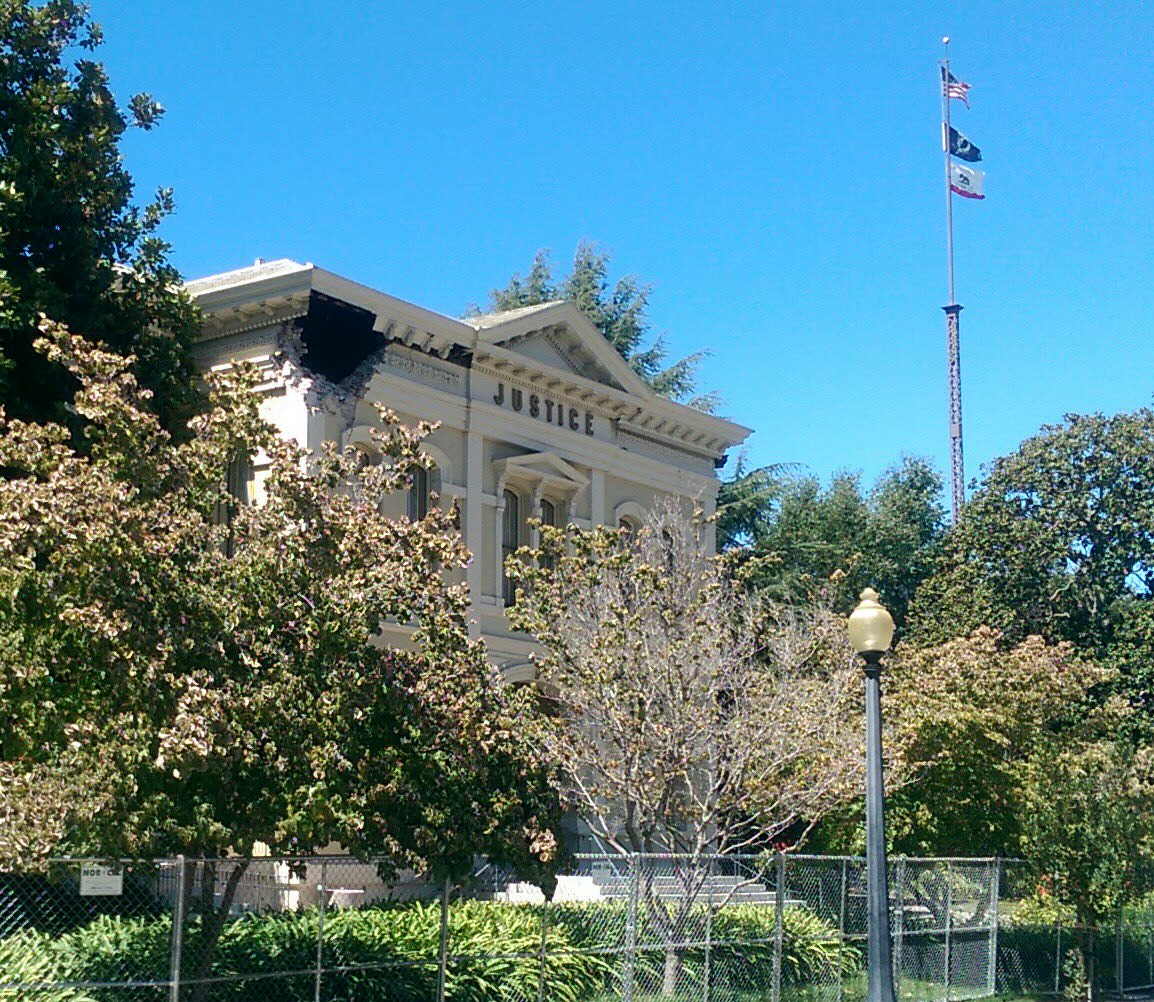
2014 earthquake damage to the 1878 courthouse building

The courthouse was damaged by the 2014 South Napa earthquake. A $11.6M contract for restoration of the courthouse was awarded by Napa County in August 2017.
