= Hackett House (Napa, California) =

- U.S. National Register of Historic Places
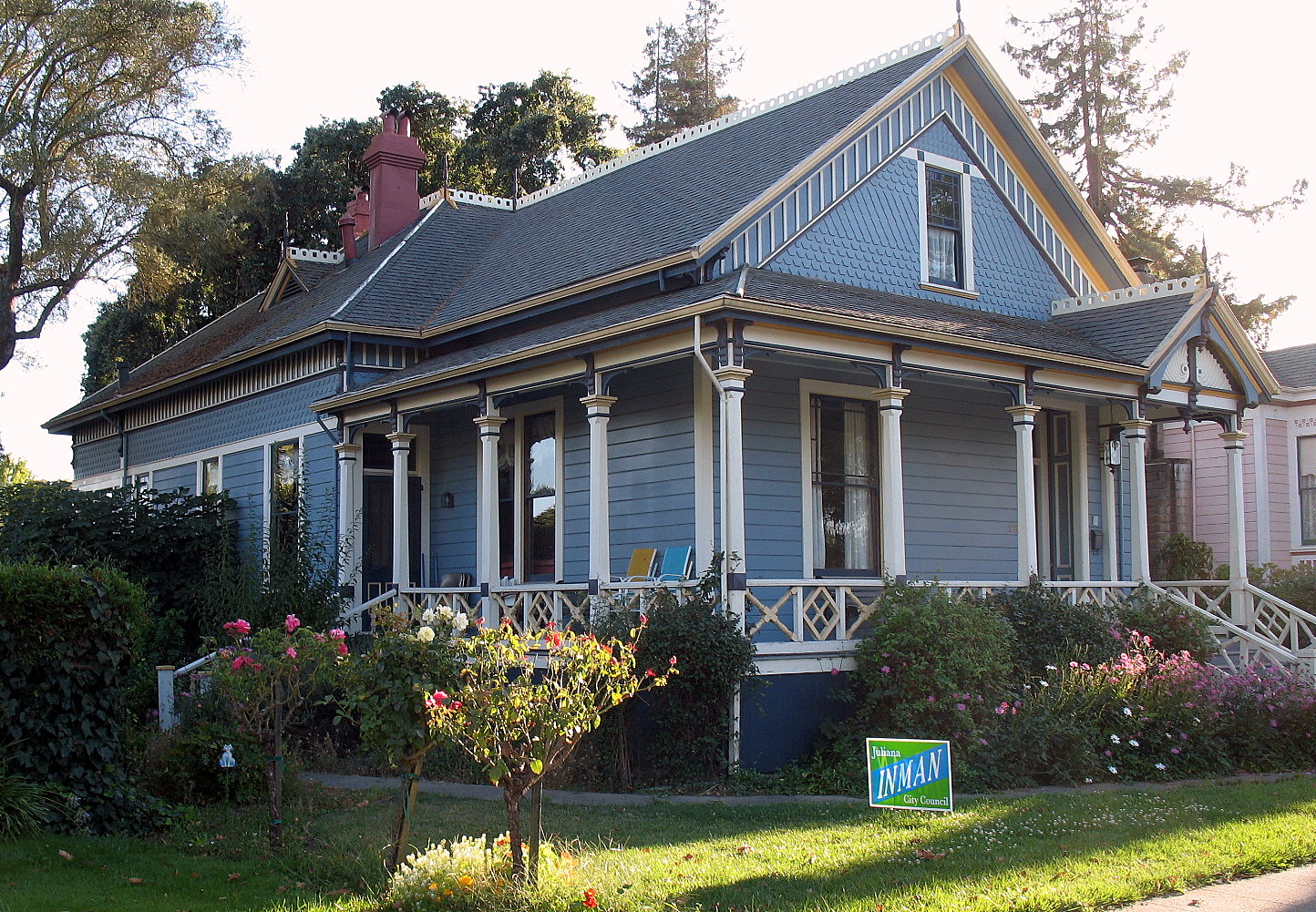

- Location within California
- Location: 2109 1st St., Napa, California
- Coordinates: 38°17′50″N 122°17′43″W
- Area: 0.2 acres (0.081 ha)
- Built: 1889
- Built by: J. W. Hoover
- Architect: Luther M. Turton
- Architectural style: Queen Anne/Eastlake
- NRHP reference No.: 84000913
- Added to NRHP: April 19, 1984

The Hackett House, at 2109 1st St. in Napa, California, was listed on the National Register of Historic Places in 1984. It was designed by architect Luther M. Turton and built by carpenter-builder J. W. Hoover.

It is a one-and-a-half-story frame Queen Anne/Eastlake cottage built in 1889 upon a raised cut stone foundation. It was rehabilitated in 1979, expanding a kitchen to the rear. It has channel siding.
