= James H. Francis House =

- U.S. National Register of Historic Places
- Location within California
- Location: 1403 Myrtle St., Calistoga, California
- Built: 1886
- Built by: John Sexton
- Architect: John Sexton
- NRHP reference No.: 79000503
- Added to NRHP: 1979

The James H. Francis House in Calistoga, California was the single family home of James H. Francis and is currently used as a Bed and breakfast. It was built in 1886 and was listed on the National Register of Historic Places in 1979.

== History ==
James Francis was a merchant, rancher, and silver miner. His brother, George M. Francis, was the owner of Napa Valley Register newspaper in the City of Napa. The structure was built in 2nd Empire style.

Francis commissioned the home to be built with stone quarried nearby and the home stood 26 feet high. It featured curled redwood and white paint. The home was designed and built by architect John Sexton.

The second owner, Col. Myron E. Billings said in 1906 the mansion was equipped with electricity, hot and cold running water and indoor bathrooms upstairs and downstairs. After Billings died the house was converted into a hospital.

The house served as the Calistoga Hospital from 1919 to 1964, until the hospital was closed.

== Renovation ==
The home had fallen into disrepair, had been vacant for more than 50 years, and was pending demolition when it was purchased by San Francisco developers Richard and Dina Dwyer for $650,000 in 2015.

The home was restored by the Dwyers. The restoration received the 2018 Preservation Design Award from the California Preservation Foundation. In September 2018 it reopened as a bed and breakfast. The hotel today has only 5 guestrooms. It has been upgraded to add modern amenities such as a pool, sauna, and grass tennis court.
