= J.C. Weinberger Winery =

- U.S. National Register of Historic Places
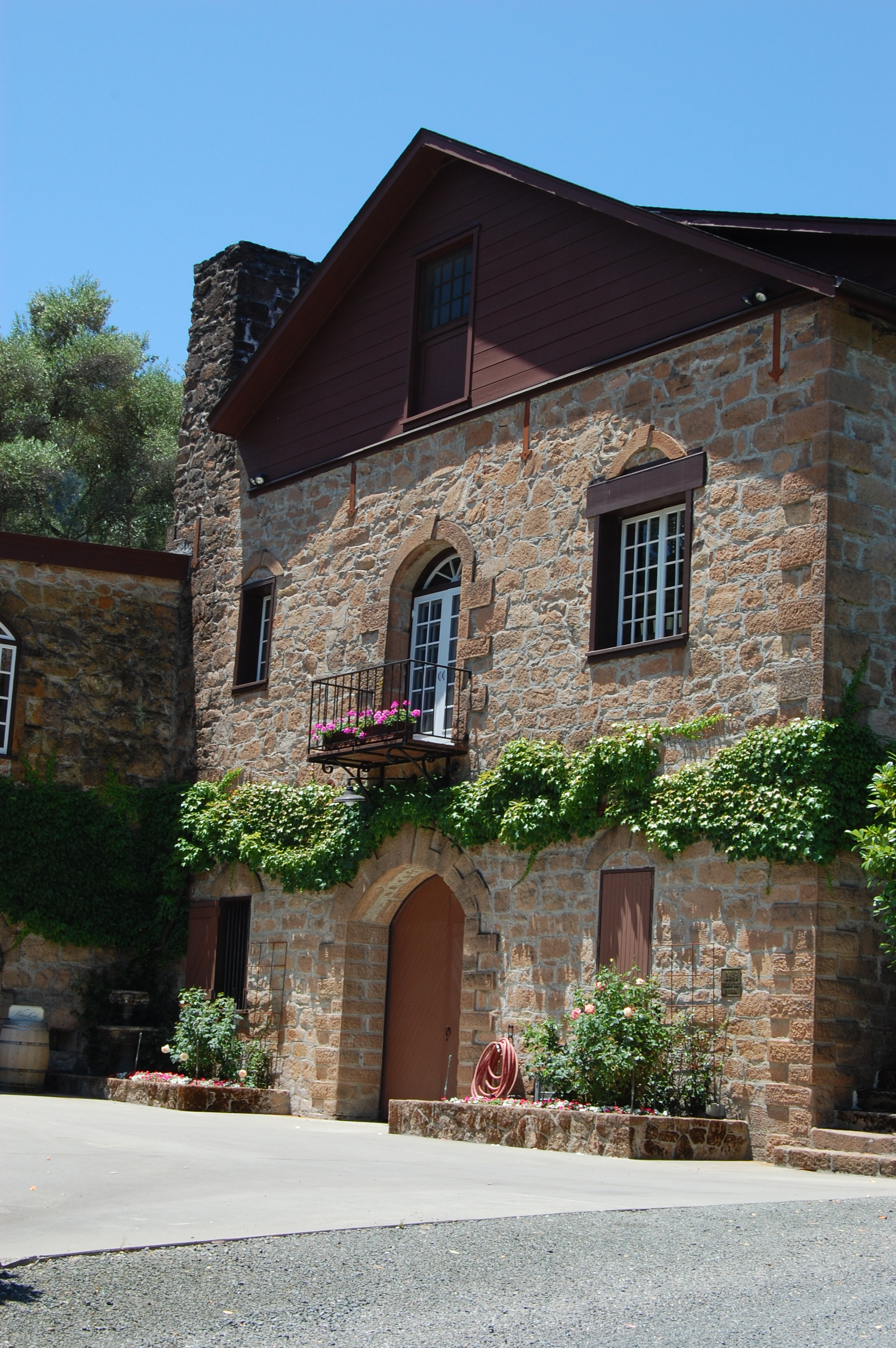
- 2011 photo

- Location within California
- Location: 2849 St. Helena Hwy., St. Helena, California
- Coordinates: 38°31′06″N 122°29′25″W
- Area: 5.69 acres (2.30 ha)
- NRHP reference No.: 15000124
- Added to NRHP: April 6, 2015

The J.C. Weinberger Winery, at 2849 St. Helena Hwy. in or near St. Helena, California, was listed on the National Register of Historic Places in 2015.

It is now the William Cole Vineyards.

It was started with construction of its two-and-a-half-story stone masonry building around 1876, which has a front gable plan, and is 63 by 41 feet (19 m × 12 m) in dimension. A two-story addition, 81 by 29 feet (24.7 m × 8.8 m) in plan, was attached around 1878. It is built of rough cut irregular coursed sandstone, 2 feet (0.61 m) thick.

It was renovated in 1938 and in 2002.
