= Winship-Smernes Building =

- U.S. National Register of Historic Places
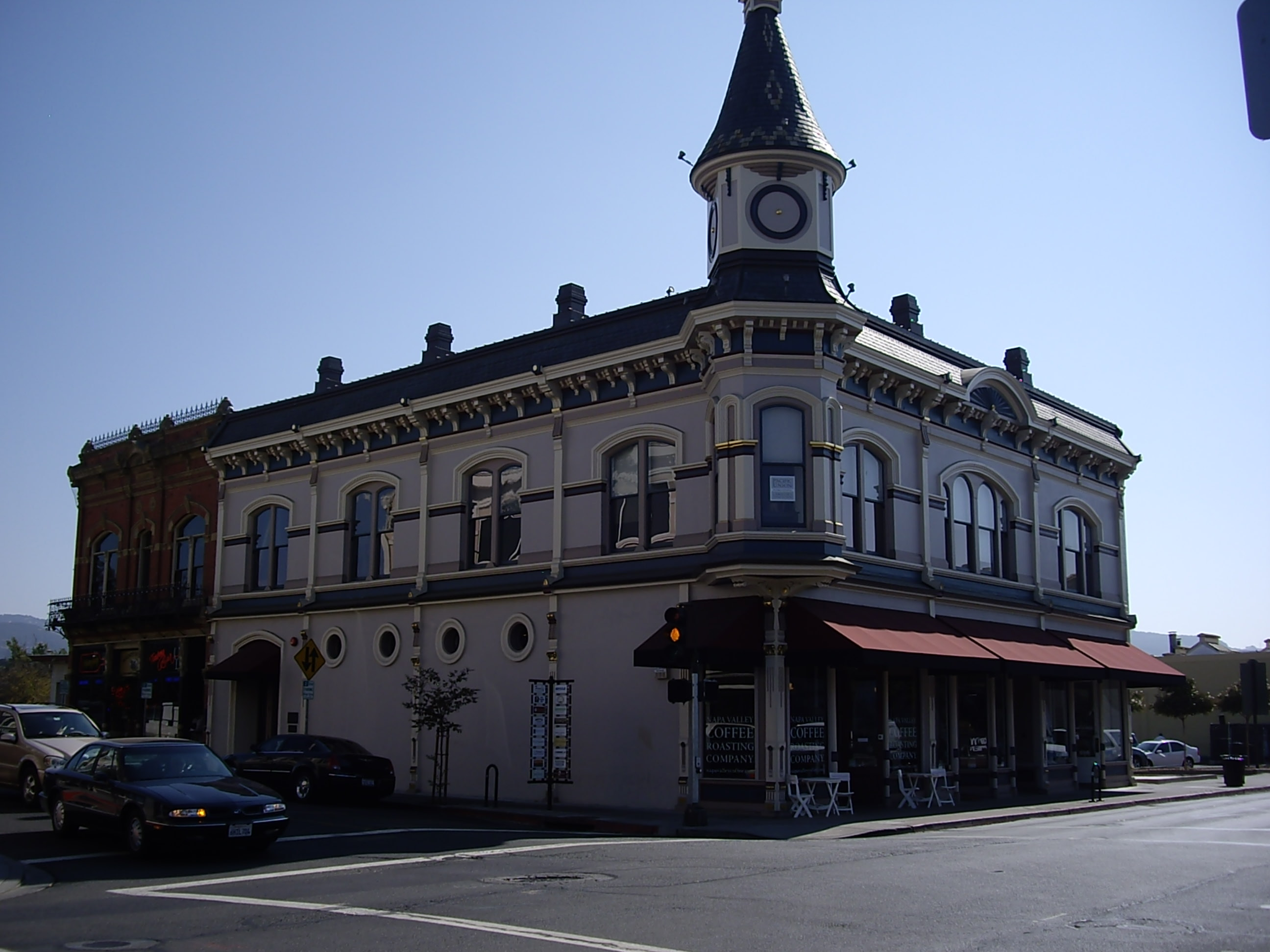

- Location within California
- Location: 948 Main St., Napa, California
- Coordinates: 38°17′57″N 122°17′02″W
- Area: 0.1 acres (0.040 ha)
- Built: 1888
- Architect: Luther Turton
- Architectural style: Italianate
- NRHP reference No.: 77000317
- Added to NRHP: July 29, 1977

The Winship-Smernes Building, at 948 Main St. in Napa, California, was built in 1888. It was designed by Napa architect Luther Turton in Italianate style. It was listed on the National Register of Historic Places in 1977.

It has also been known as the Hennessey Building.

The National Register nomination document from 1977 should be available online, but in 2019 only the accompanying photo is found.
