= Bank of Napa =

- U.S. National Register of Historic Places
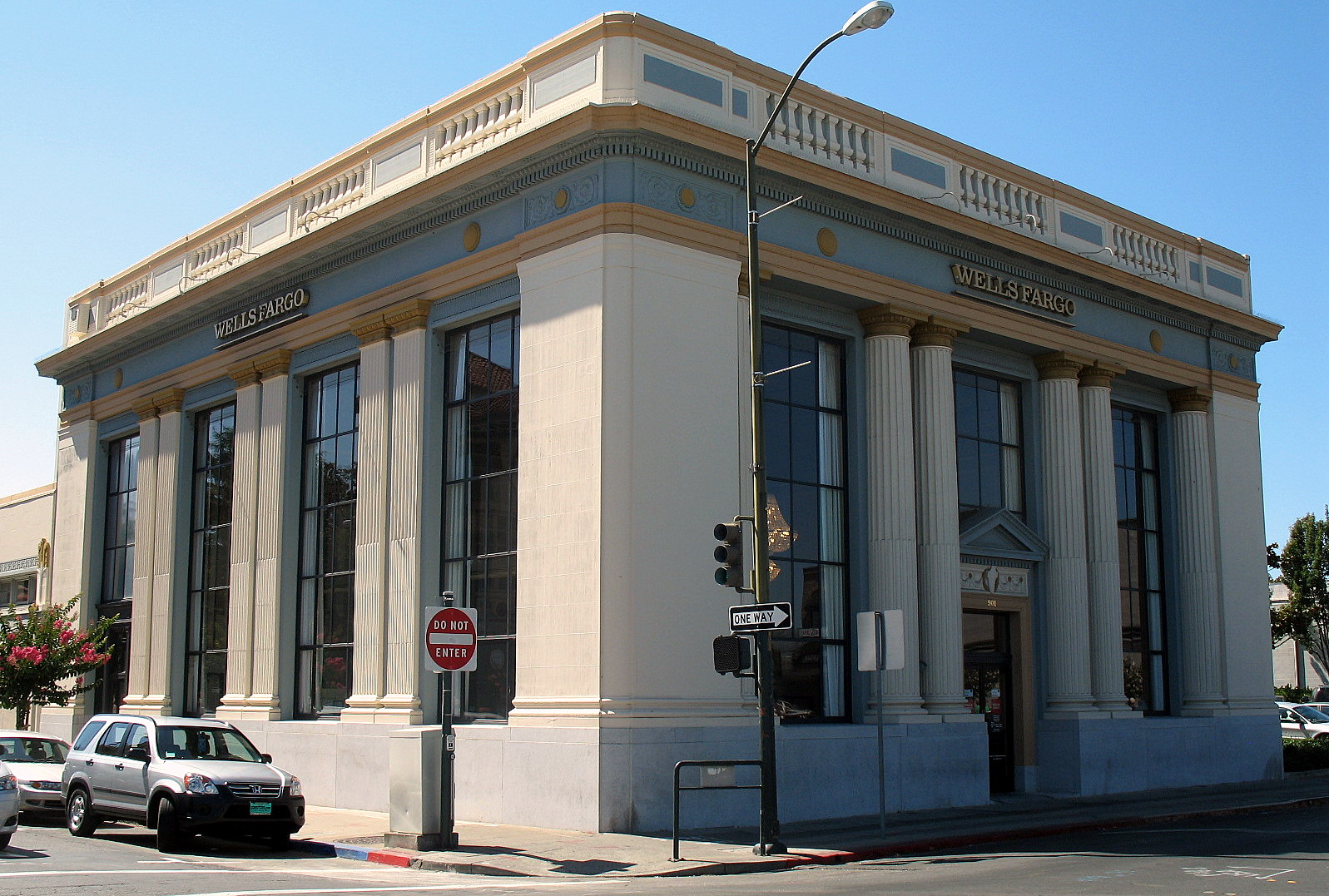

- Location within California
- Location: 903 Main St. and 908 Brown St., Napa, California
- Coordinates: 38°17′57″N 122°17′05″W
- Area: less than one acre
- Built: 1923
- Architectural style: Classical Revival, Art Deco
- NRHP reference No.: 92000785
- Added to NRHP: June 18, 1992

The Bank of Napa, at 903 Main St. and 908 Brown St. in Napa, California was built in 1923. It was listed on the National Register of Historic Places in 1992.

It is a two-story building stretching for a block, consisting of an original Classical Revival-style commercial building built in 1923 plus a large stuccoed Art Deco annex added in 1934.
