= Chateau Chevalier =

- U.S. National Register of Historic Places
- Location within California
- Location: 3101 Spring Mountain Rd., St. Helena, California
- Coordinates: 38°30′53″N 122°30′35″W
- Area: 1 acre (0.40 ha)
- Built: 1891
- Built by: M.G. Bale (stonemason); Pithie & Birkett
- Architectural style: Chateau Style
- NRHP reference No.: 87000926
- Added to NRHP: June 12, 1987

Chateau Chevalier, at 3101 Spring Mountain Rd. in St. Helena, California, in Napa Valley, was built in 1891. It was listed on the National Register of Historic Places in 1987.

It was built for French immigrant and wine importer Fortune Chevalier. It reflects the "wine boom" era in Napa County, after phylloxera destroyed numerous vineyards in France, Europe.

The Chateau Chevalier Wine Cellar, 56 by 79 feet (17 m × 24 m) in plan, is a two-story stone building stepped into the hillside.

The listing included a second contributing building, a carriage house.

== See also ==
- Chateau Pacheteau (1906), in Calistoga
