= Weber House (Russell, Arkansas) =

Historic house in Arkansas, United States

- U.S. National Register of Historic Places
- Location within Arkansas Location within the United States
- Location: Elm St., Russell, Arkansas
- Coordinates: 35°21′46″N 91°30′36″W
- Area: less than one acre
- Built: 1933
- Architect: Herman Page
- Architectural style: Bungalow/craftsman
- MPS: White County MPS
- NRHP reference No.: 91001272
- Added to NRHP: September 5, 1991

The Weber House was a historic house on Elm Street in Russell, Arkansas. It was a single-story wood-frame structure, with a front gable roof, novelty siding, and a foundation of brick piers. The roof extended across a deep porch in front, with decorative knee brackets. Built in 1933, it was a fine example of late Craftsman architecture in Russell.

The house was listed on the National Register of Historic Places in 1991. It has been listed as destroyed in the Arkansas Historic Preservation Program database.

== See also ==
- National Register of Historic Places listings in White County, Arkansas
