= Semorile Building =

- U.S. National Register of Historic Places
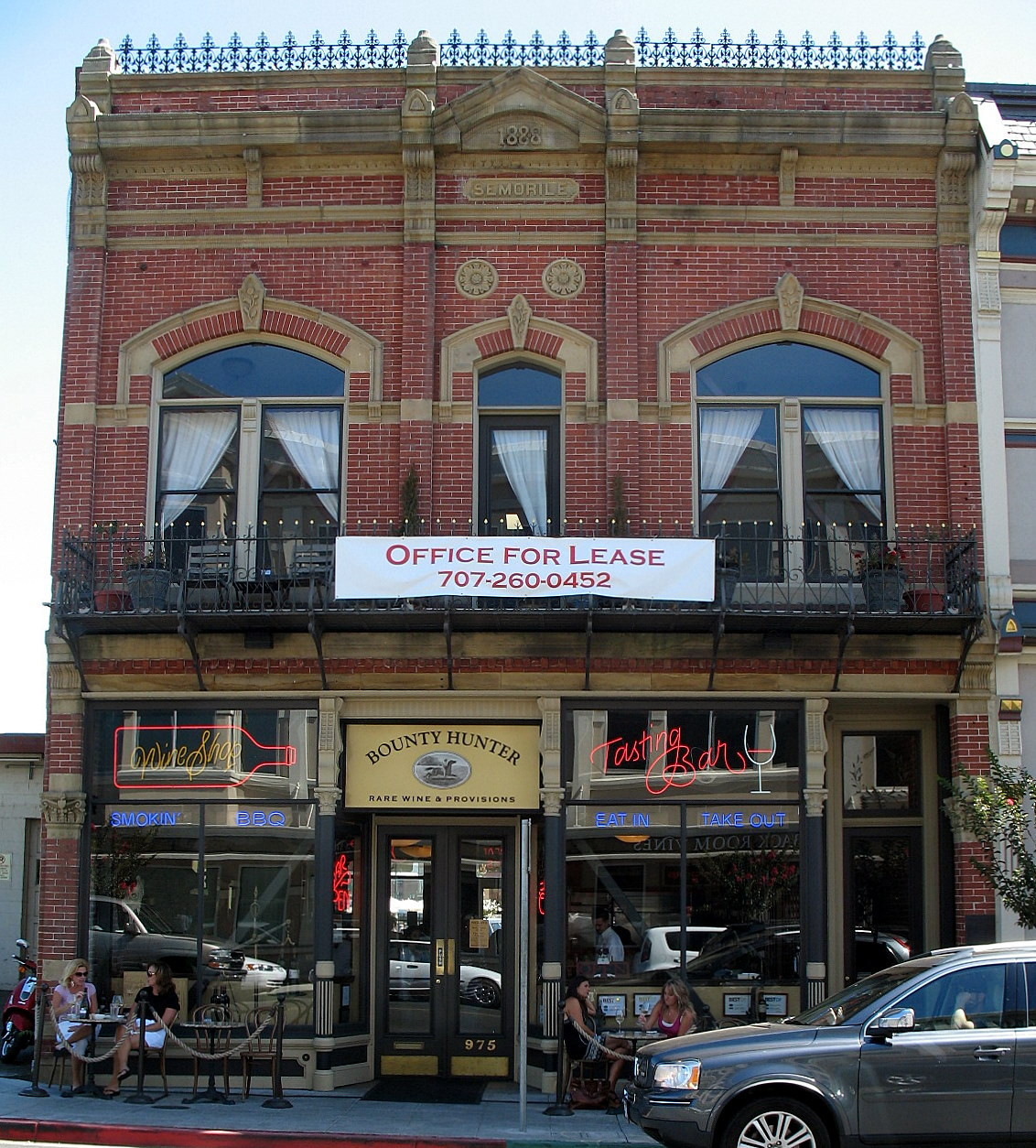

- Location within California
- Location: 975 1st St., Napa, California
- Coordinates: 38°17′57″N 122°17′02″W
- Area: 0.1 acres (0.040 ha)
- Built: 1888
- Architect: L.M. Turton
- Architectural style: Italianate
- NRHP reference No.: 74000541
- Added to NRHP: November 21, 1974

The Semorile Building, at 975 1st St. in Napa, California, was built in 1888. It was listed on the National Register of Historic Places in 1974.

It is a two-story commercial building built in 1888 of red brick and cut stone. It has an ornamental iron balcony on its second story and it has a parapet. It was designed by Napa architect Luther M. Turton in Italianate style.

The secretary of the Napa Historic Preservation Society wrote that this building is a landmark in downtown Napa and "easily the most refined example of Italianate commercial architecture in Napa".

It was built for the Semorile family which came in 1855 from Semorile (the native village has the same name), near Genoa, Northern Italy, to Mariposa, California, in Gold Rush country, and later moved to the Napa Valley. Bartholomew Semorile and his sons operated a grocery business in the building.
