= Chateau Pacheteau =

- U.S. National Register of Historic Places
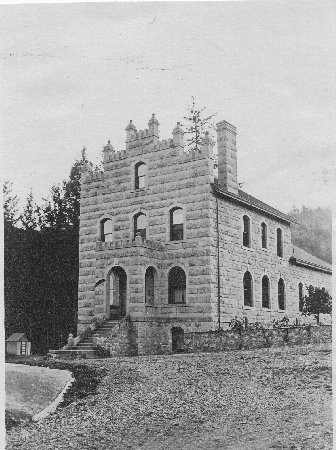

- Location within California
- Location: 1670 Diamond Mountain Rd., Calistoga, California
- Coordinates: 38°33′50″N 122°34′45″W
- Area: 18 acres (7.3 ha)
- Built: 1891
- Built by: W.A. Harrison (carpentry); Bennasini & Maggetta (masonry)
- Architect: William Corlett (carriage house)
- NRHP reference No.: 15000913
- Added to NRHP: December 22, 2015

Chateau Pacheteau, in Calistoga, California, in Napa Valley, was listed on the National Register of Historic Places in 2015.

The "chateau" is a four-story residence built in 1906. The National Register nominator termed it an example of "stone church architecture", and asserted it resembles Richardsonian Romanesque architecture. It is north-facing, and is 35 by 80 feet (11 m × 24 m) in plan. Its "most unusual feature is the defensive stepped false front façade including a crenellated parapet composed of crenels and merlons, which appear again above the stone portico below. The parapet obscures the wood shake covered gable roof behind it."

It was commissioned by Jacques Pacheteau. In its construction W.A. Harrison of St. Helena was in charge of carpentry, and the masonry work was done by Bennasini & Maggetta.

The listing included a second contributing building—a detached carriage house—and five non-contributing buildings. The carriage house, also built in 1906, is also built of stone, and is two-storied with a central cupola above. It was designed by architect William Corlett.

== See also ==
- Chateau Chevalier (1891), in St. Helena
