= United States Post Office (Napa, California) =

- US Post Office--Napa Franklin Station
- U.S. National Register of Historic Places
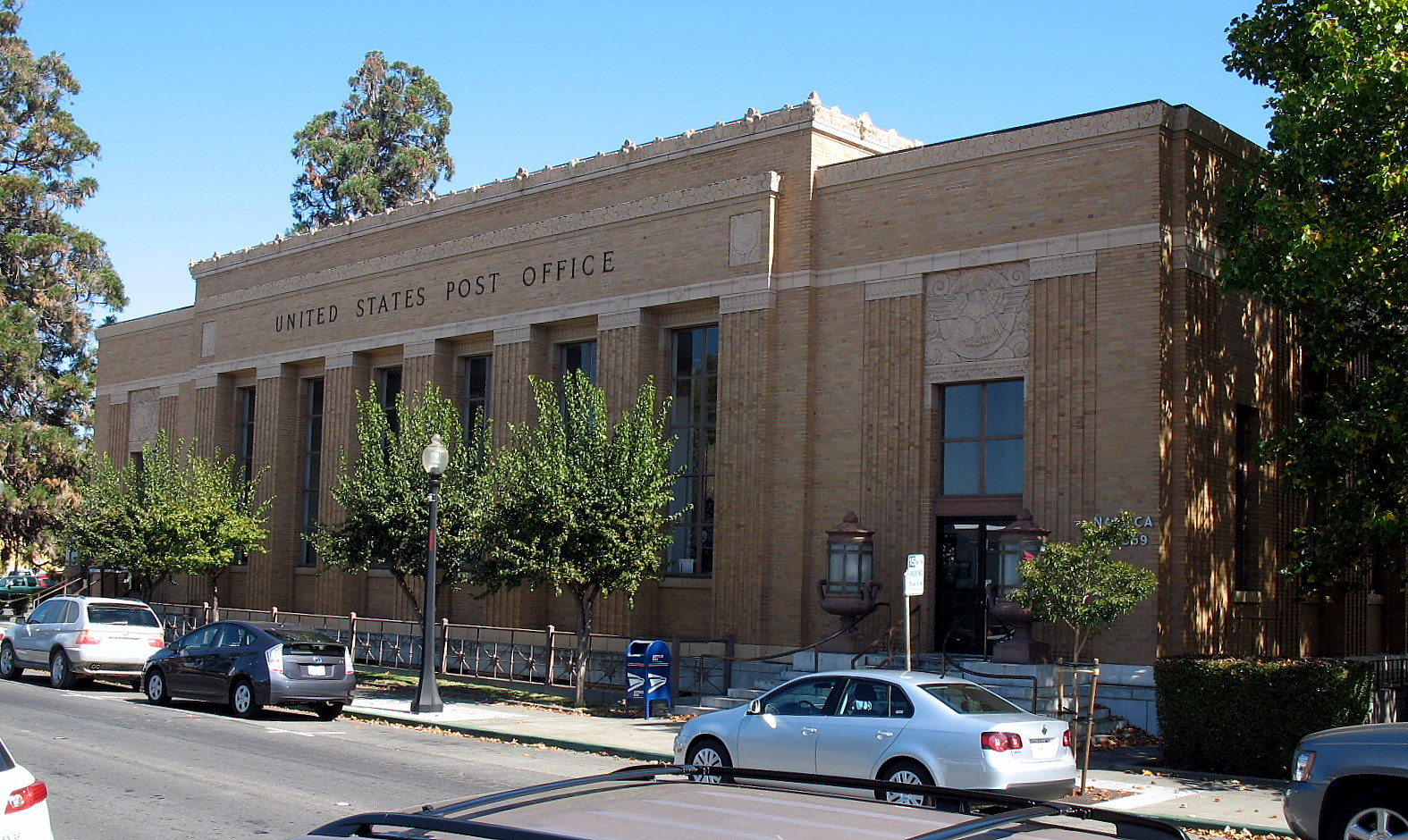
- The post office in 2010

- Location within California Location within the United States
- Location: 1352 2nd St., Napa, California
- Coordinates: 38°17′56″N 122°17′15″W
- Area: 0.8 acres (0.32 ha)
- Built: 1933
- Architect: Corlett, William H.; Reed & Corlett
- Architectural style: Art Deco
- MPS: US Post Office in California 1900–1941 TR
- NRHP reference No.: 85000133
- Added to NRHP: January 11, 1985

The U.S. Post Office, also known as the Napa Franklin Station, served the 94559 zip code area of Napa, California. The post office was built in 1933 with funding from the Public Works Administration. Architect William H. Corlett designed the Art Deco building. The front facade of the building has three sections; the central section has six bays divided by piers with terra cotta capitals. A terra cotta cornice adorned with ram and cow heads tops the central section. The side sections, which contain the building's two entrances, feature panels with decorative eagle designs above the doorways and urn-shaped bronze light fixtures on either side. The post office's lobby features a painted bas-relief plastic ceiling, unusual in federally constructed post offices, and a terrazzo floor.

The post office was added to the National Register of Historic Places on January 11, 1985.

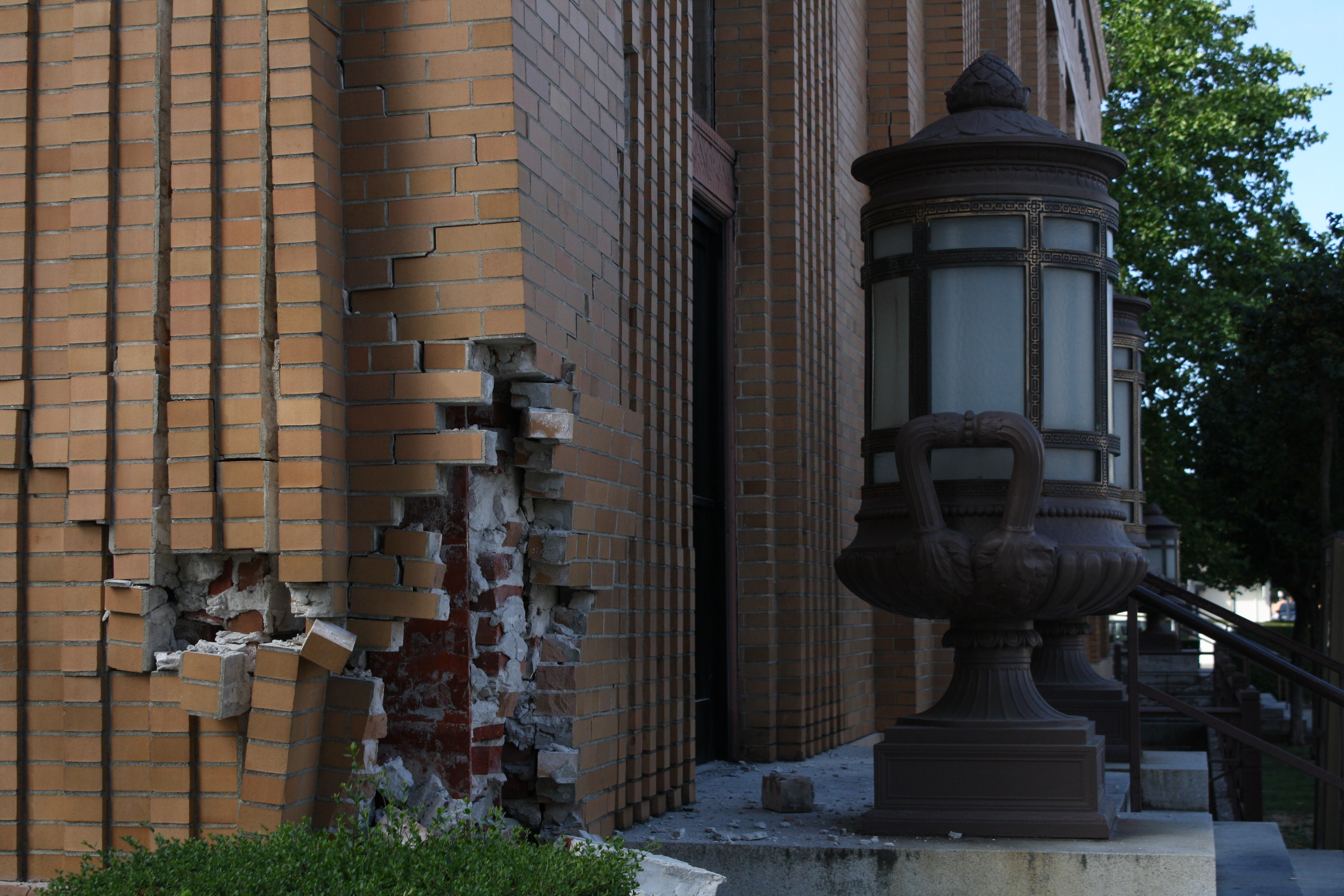
damage from South Napa quake

The building was damaged by the 2014 South Napa earthquake.

Both this building and the main Napa Post Office at 1625 Trancas Street were heavily damaged and red-tagged (not able to be occupied) after the earthquake. The United States Postal Service determined that repairing this building would be too costly. They tried to tear it down to rebuild another Post Office, but after neighborhood outcry, sold it to a developer for $2M.

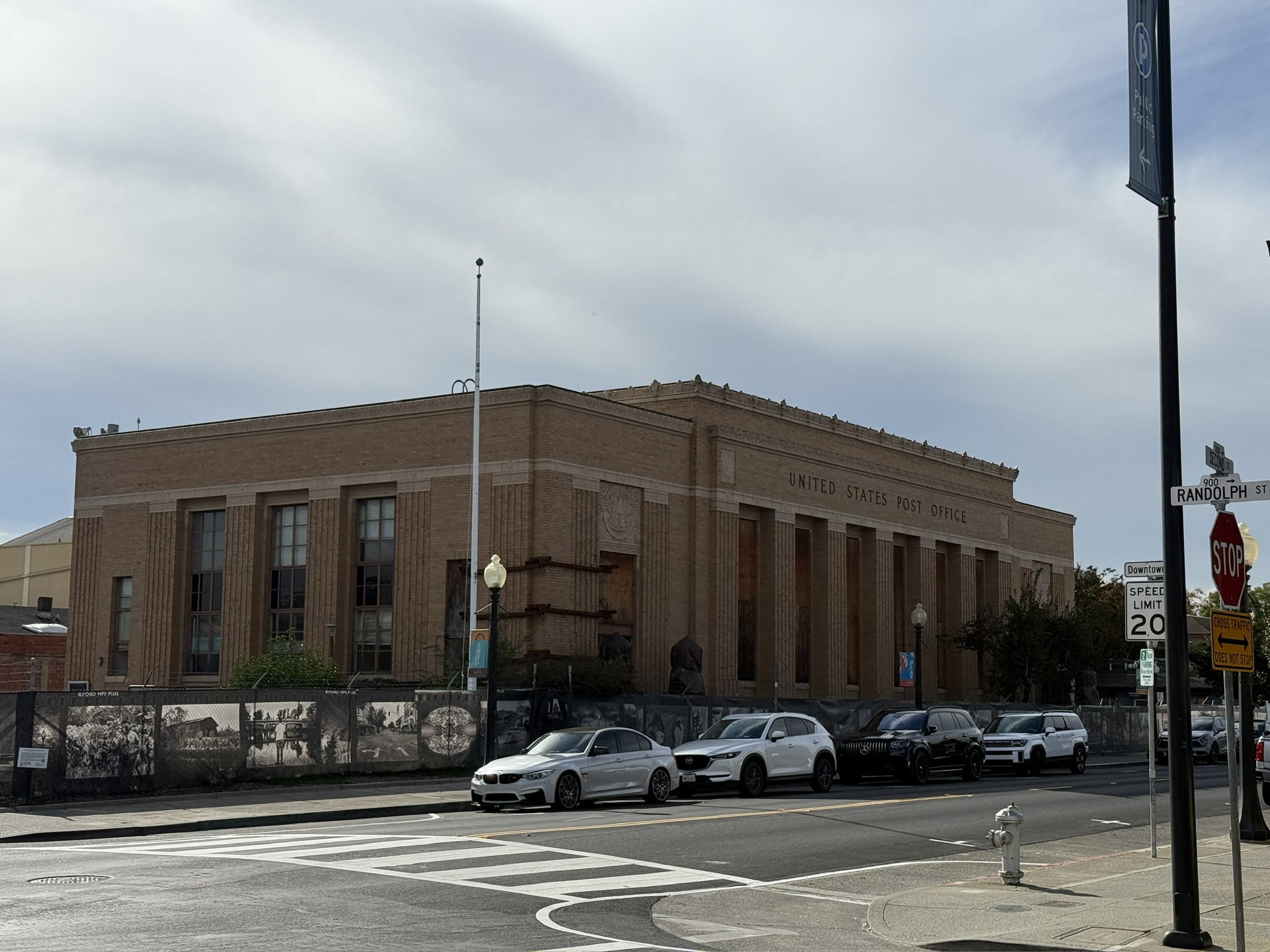
The shuttered post office in November, 2025.

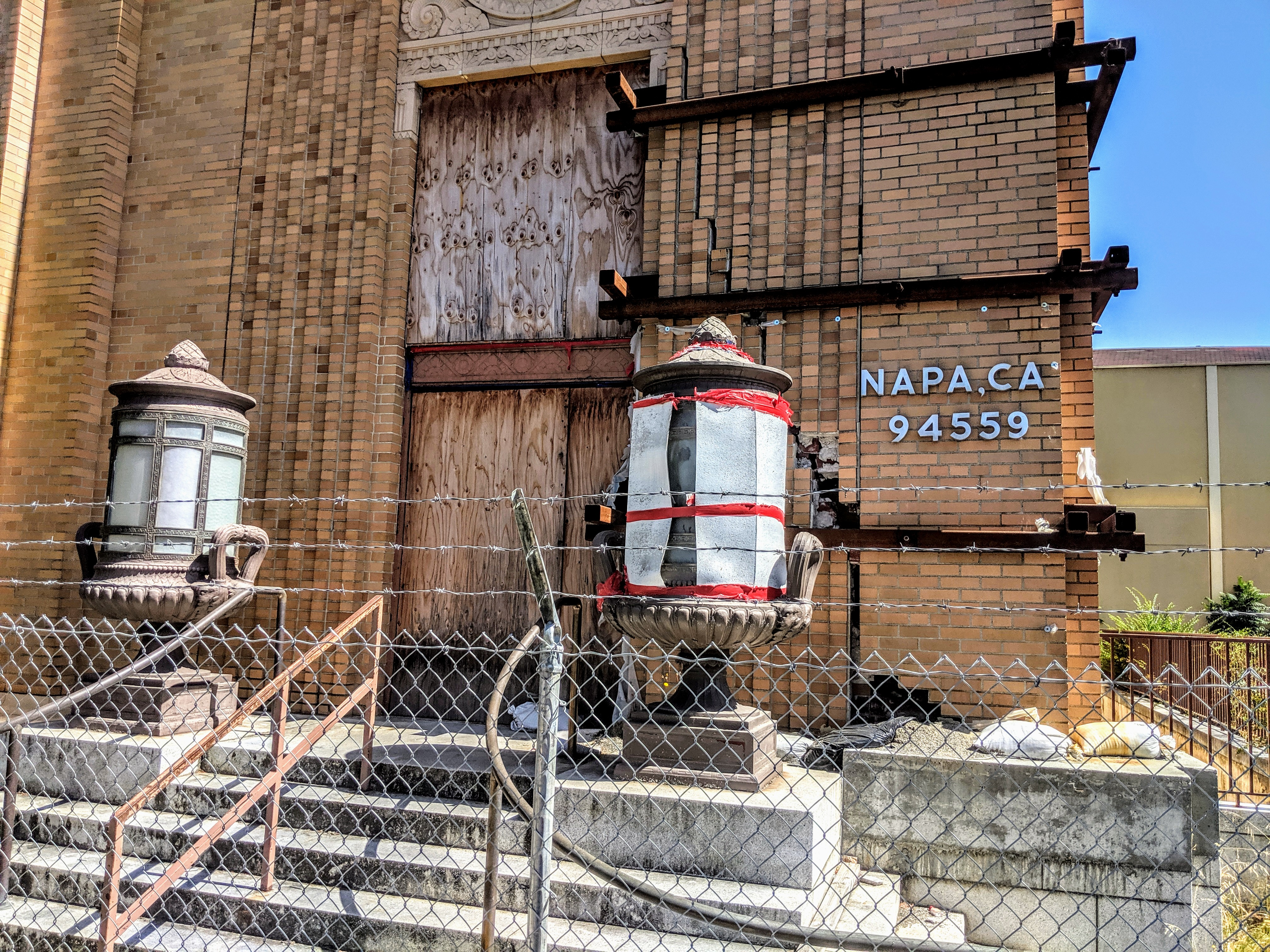
The damaged post office building five years after the earthquake

The developer plans to turn the building into a hotel.

== See also ==
- List of United States post offices
