= Atkinson Hall (Geneseo, Illinois) =

- U.S. National Register of Historic Places
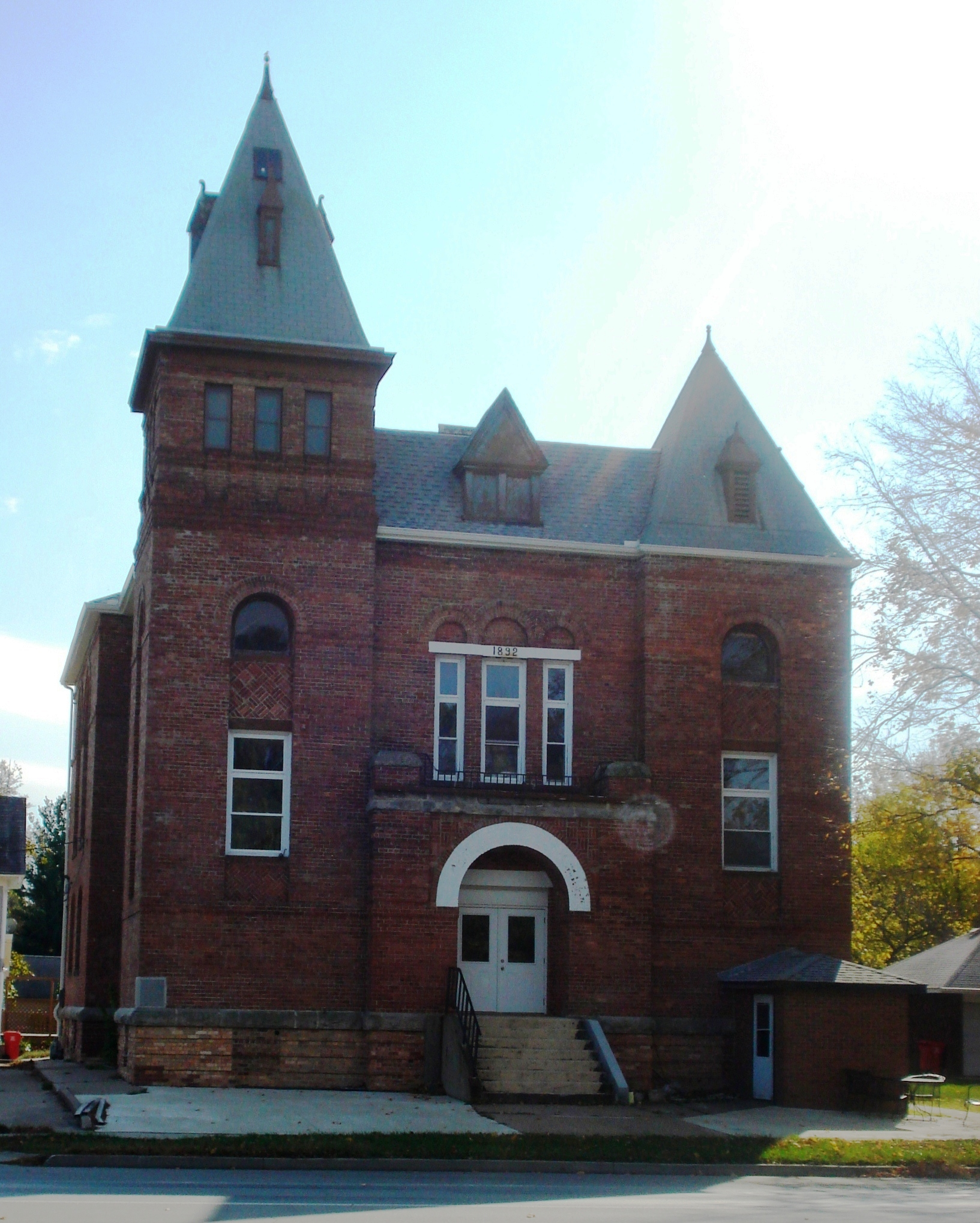
- Atkinson Hall built in 1892

- Location within Illinois Location within the United States
- Location: 108 W. Main St. Geneseo, Illinois
- Coordinates: 41°26′51″N 90°9′23″W
- Built: 1892
- Built by: Clark, Alexander K.
- Architect: Hosford, J.E.
- Architectural style: Romanesque
- NRHP reference No.: 03001203
- Added to NRHP: November 28, 2003

Atkinson Hall is a historic building located at 108 West Main Street in Geneseo, Illinois. The Geneseo Collegiate Institute, a Presbyterian college preparatory school that opened in 1884, built the building in 1892 for its music department. Architect J.E. Hosford designed the building in the Romanesque Revival style. The front of the red brick building faces north and has a pyramidal tower at its corners, with the northeast tower roughly 10 feet (3.0 m) taller than the northwest one. The main entrance and many of the building's windows are arched, a key feature of Romanesque architecture. The building served the college until it closed in 1922; four years later, it became the American Legion Hall, Shearer Post #350.

The building was listed on the National Register of Historic Places on November 28, 2003.
