= John Lee Webber House =

- U.S. National Register of Historic Places
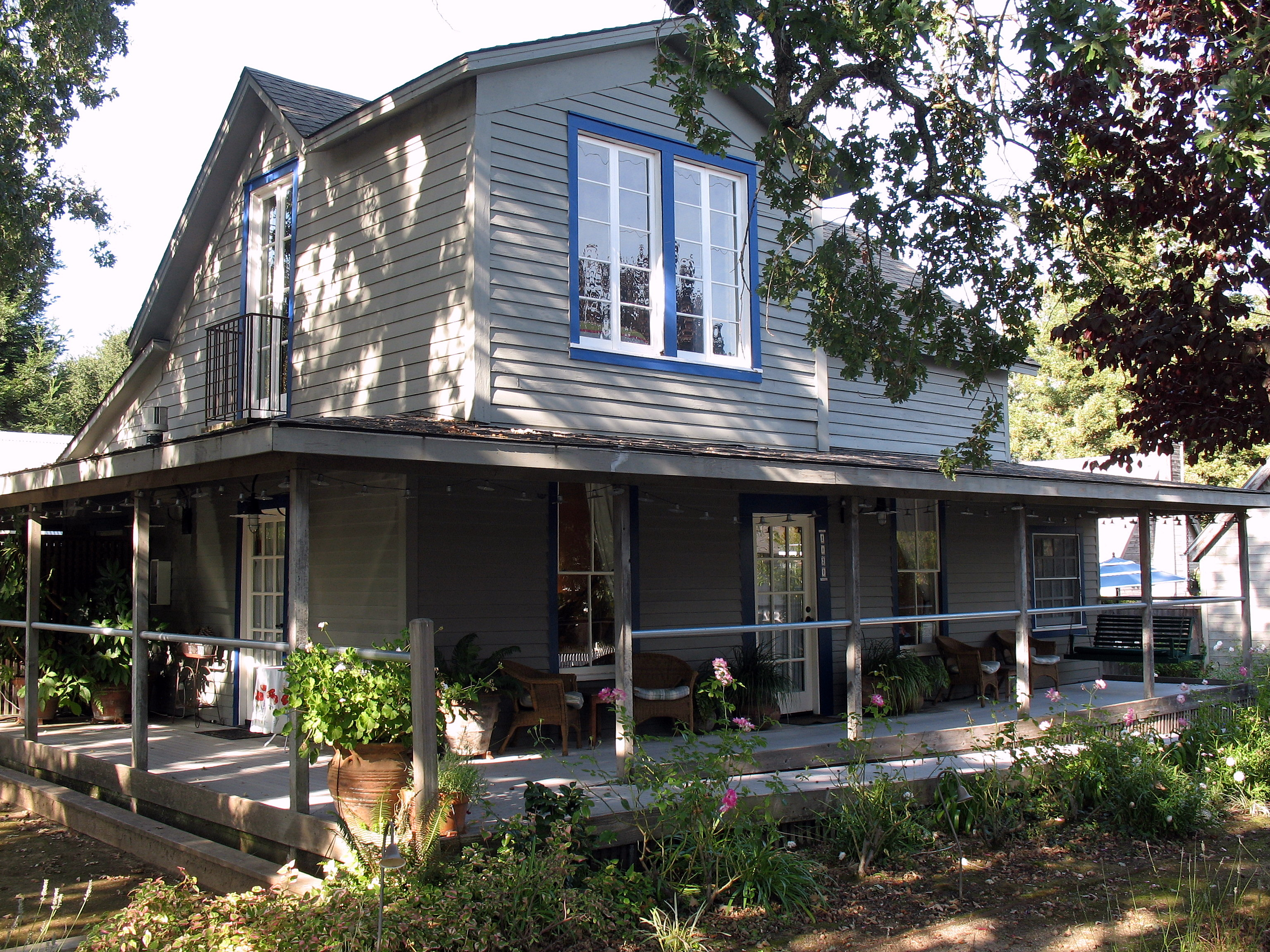

- Location within California
- Location: 2020 Webber St., Yountville, California
- Coordinates: 38.404263°N 122.363611°W
- Area: 0.4 acres (0.16 ha)
- Built: c.1859, 1907-08
- Architectural style: Greek Revival
- NRHP reference No.: 82002219
- Added to NRHP: January 19, 1982

The John Lee Webber House, also known as "The Webber Place", in Yountville, California, was built around 1859. It was listed on the National Register of Historic Places in 1982.

It is a two-story wood frame farmhouse which was built before 1859. It was built in simplified, vernacular Greek Revival style. The house was originally built as a one-and-a-half-story clapboarded farmhouse, with a gable roof and a central brick chimney, and was located on the Finnell Ranch, almost a mile east of its current location in downtown Yountville. It had a one-story rear addition which served as a kitchen. The house was moved to the current location in the 1860s. The house was expanded in 1907-08 by the Webber family, at which time it was given its current appearance. The front entrance of the farmhouse, in the non-gable facade now facing southeast, remained as the main entrance in 1980.

The 1907-08 renovation added the gabled second-story room cantilevered over the front porch, with large window facing southeast. It also added/expanded to the northwest (apparently, while "north" is stated), forming a wing making an "L" with the original house. This included an indoor bathroom beyond the kitchen, and then an enclosed back porch. It had a shingle-sided second story with bedrooms having tongue-and-groove panelling. The first floor of the renovated house had wall-papered rooms, and consisted of kitchen, dining room, and front and back parlors.

In 1980, doublehung sash windows survived in the original house and in the rear extension, while some second-story windows had been replaced by vertical casement windows.

A second contributing building is a shiplap-sided gabled two-story carriage house/barn (photo #4), opening onto Webber Avenue, which was built in 1905. It held two horses, a cow, a buggy, and a surrey. It had sliding frame double-doors, and a rectangular door and square windows above in the gable end. As of 1980 the barn was unaltered, and was used for storage. In 2019, the carriage house still exists, although it appears to have been renovated/modified.

Since 1980, the property has become the Lavender Bed and Breakfast, and additional buildings have been constructed in the former yard-spaces. (Note: This is now the "Lavender Bed and Breakfast". Oddly, the B&B's webpage has no photos distinctively showing the house or carriage barn. It is hard to read street number on the house in Streetview, but a nearby house, across the street, has number 2011. And Google maps points to this house for 2020. Photo and Streetview seem to show house in NRHP photos. Satellite view shows three additional oblong buildings have been inserted into former yard-space in the property. These presumably provide additional guestroom spaces, and are connected by walkways to the original house and the renovated coach house.)

The property is located at 2020 Webber Ave. in Yountville, on the north corner of Webber Ave. and Jefferson St. Apparently there has been a street renumbering; the National Register documentation states it is located at 6610 Webber Ave.
