= Capt. N. H. Wulff House =

- U.S. National Register of Historic Places
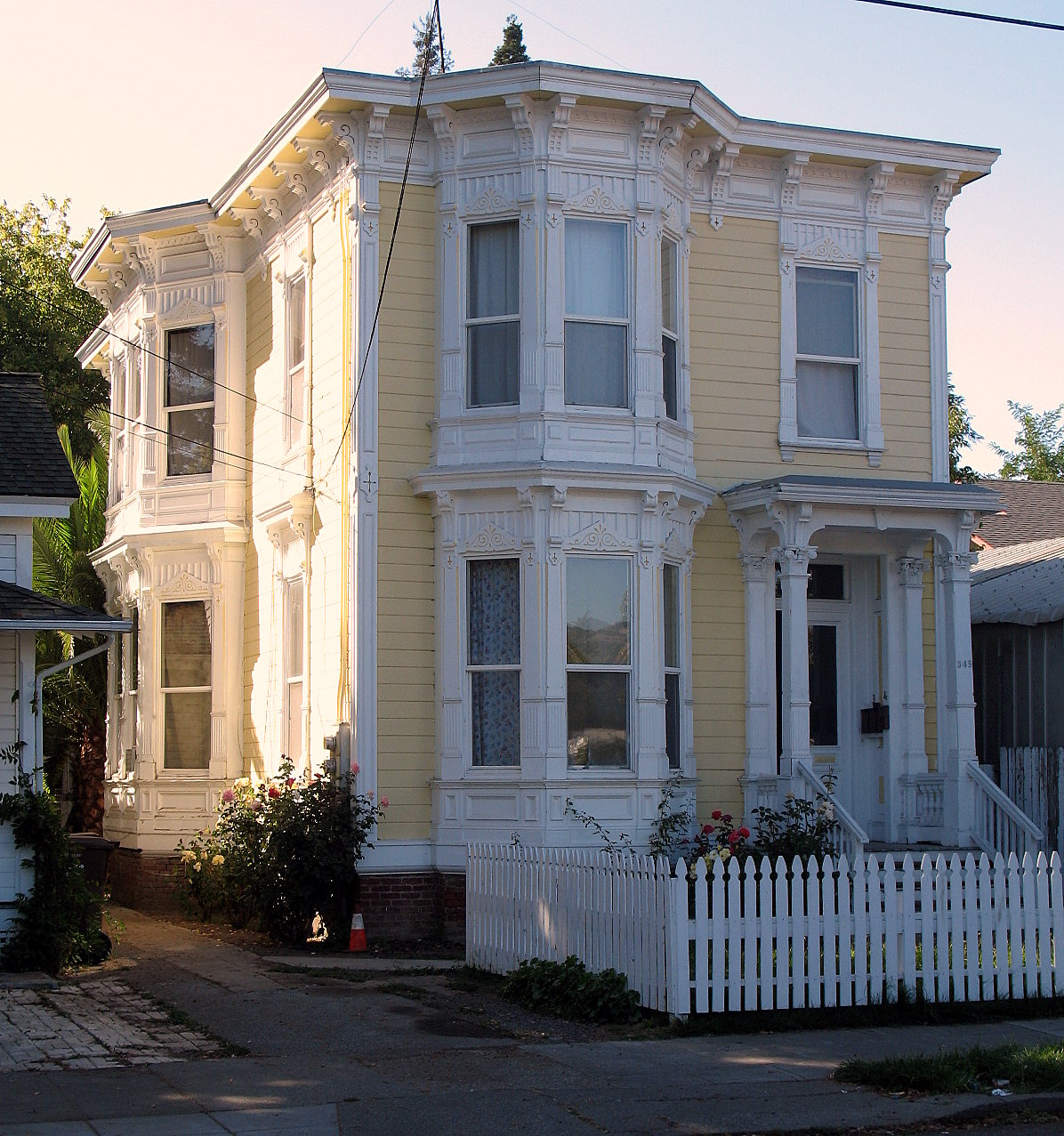

- Location within California
- Location: 549 Brown St., Napa, California
- Coordinates: 38°17′41″N 122°16′56″W
- Area: less than one acre
- Built: 1885
- Built by: Thomas Derry
- Architect: William H. Corlett
- Architectural style: Italianate
- NRHP reference No.: 92000994
- Added to NRHP: August 18, 1992

The Capt. N. H. Wulff House, at 549 Brown St. in Napa, California, was built in 1885. It was listed on the National Register of Historic Places in 1992.

It is a two-story wood frame Italianate-style house. In 1992 it was "virtually unaltered" since its original construction, and retained its architectural integrity.

It was deemed significant as one of the few surviving buildings associated with Napa's maritime history. The navigable Napa River flows 20 miles (32 km) from Napa to the San Francisco Bay, and early in Napa's history was essentially the only way to transport produce and passengers to San Fran, and assorted goods and passengers back. River traffic did not decline until the 1920s. Captain N. H. Wulff was "one of the city's most important steamboat owners and masters during the last half of the nineteenth century. Because Wulff was engaged in carrying goods and passengers vital to the growth of the town, the building is also significant in the areas of commerce and transportation.... Wulff had the house erected at the height of his career in 1885 and lived in it until his death in 1911."

The house was designed by William H. Corlett and built by Thomas Derry.
