= Atkinson House (Rutherford, California) =

- U.S. National Register of Historic Places
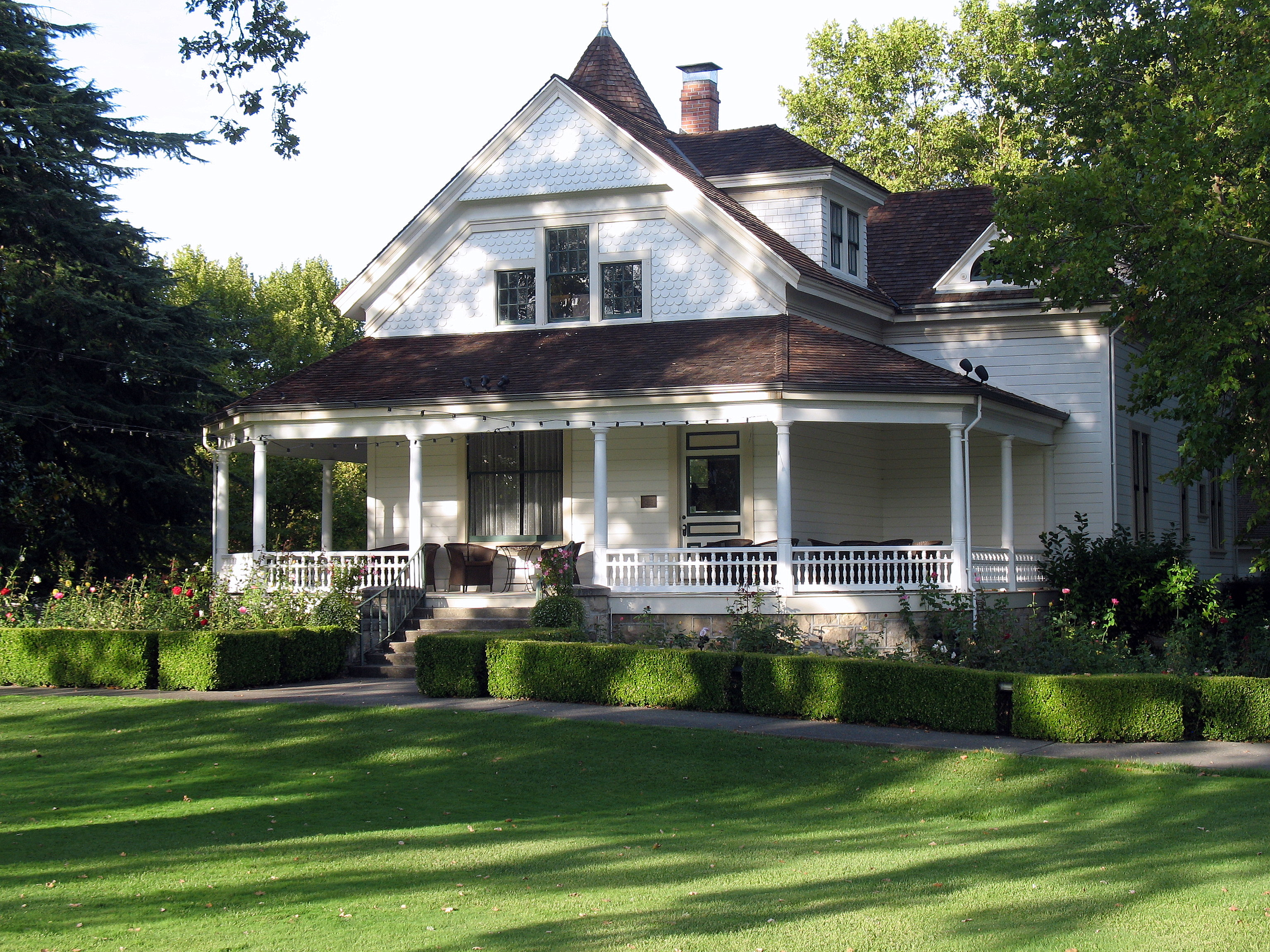

- Location within California
- Location: 8440 St. Helena Hwy., Rutherford, California
- Coordinates: 38°27′14″N 122°24′48″W
- Area: 0.7 acres (0.28 ha)
- Built: 1881
- Architectural style: Queen Anne
- NRHP reference No.: 90001443
- Added to NRHP: September 13, 1990

The Atkinson House in Rutherford, California, at 8440 St. Helena Hwy., was built in 1881. It was listed on the National Register of Historic Places in 1990.

It is Queen Anne in style, and a cut stone foundation, wrap-around porch, fishscale shingles on the gable end, and polygonal tower distinguish its "exterior."

It was deemed significant "for its association with the 'Golden Age of Wine' in the Napa Valley during the 1880s. The building was the main house for the award-winning Ewer and Atkinson Winery in Rutherford, established in 1881. Their successes and failures closely paralleled those of the burgeoning wine industry in Napa County during the 1880s. The house is also significant in the architectural history of the area. It is an excellent representative example of rural residential Queen Anne design in the Napa area.
