= Buford House (Napa, California) =

- U.S. National Register of Historic Places
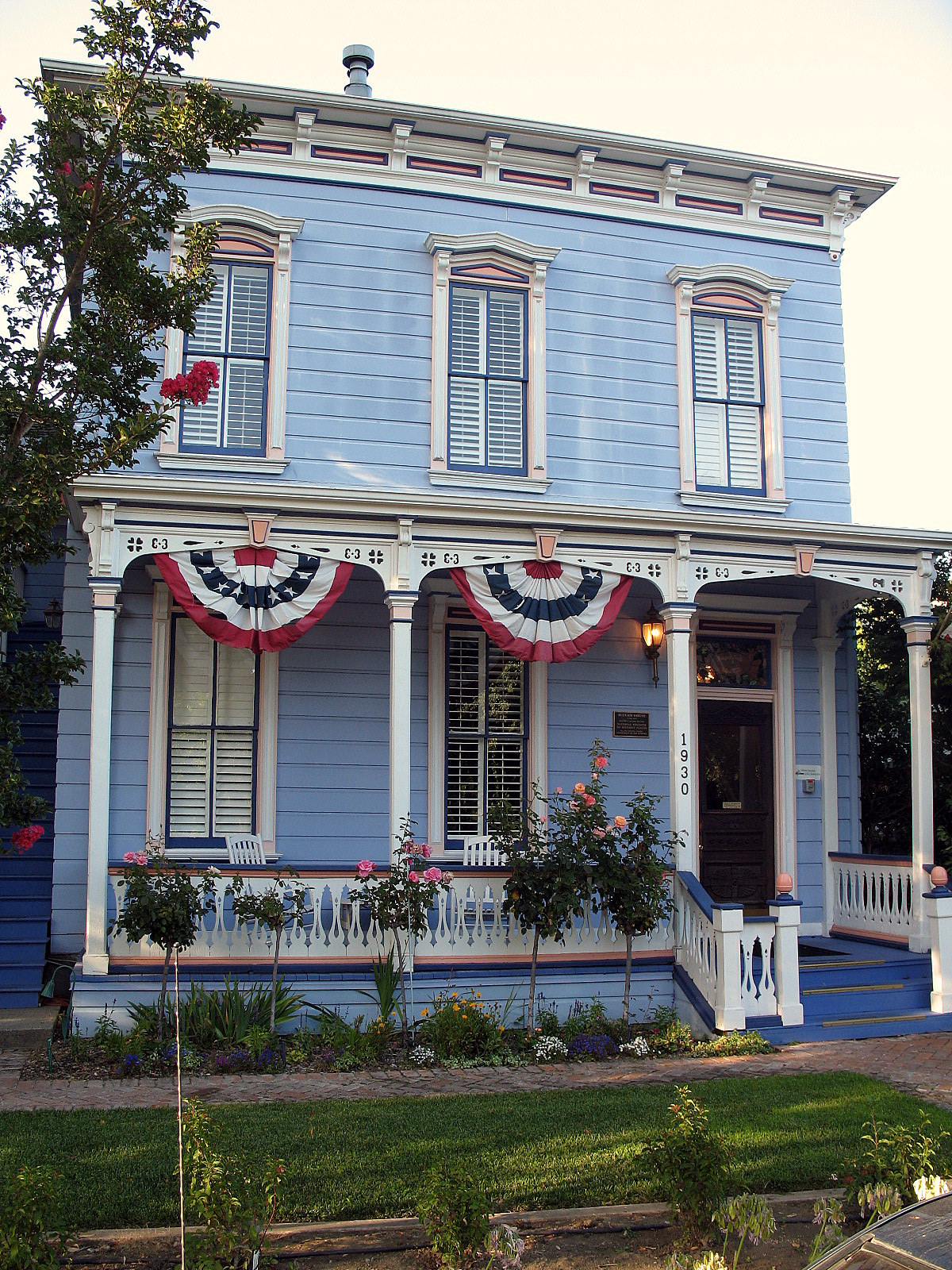

- Location within California
- Location: 1930 Clay St., Napa, California
- Coordinates: 38°17′55″N 122°17′38″W
- Area: 0.3 acres (0.12 ha)
- Built: 1877
- Architectural style: Italianate, Romano-Tuscan
- NRHP reference No.: 77000314
- Added to NRHP: November 11, 1977

The Buford House in Napa, California, at 1930 Clay St., was built in 1877. It was listed on the National Register of Historic Places in 1977.

It has Italianate or Romano-Tuscan style.
