= Tulucay =

Tulucay may refer to:

- Rancho Tulucay
- Tuluka, California
