= Rancho Yokaya =

Mexican land grant in California

Coordinates: 39.260°N 123.210°W

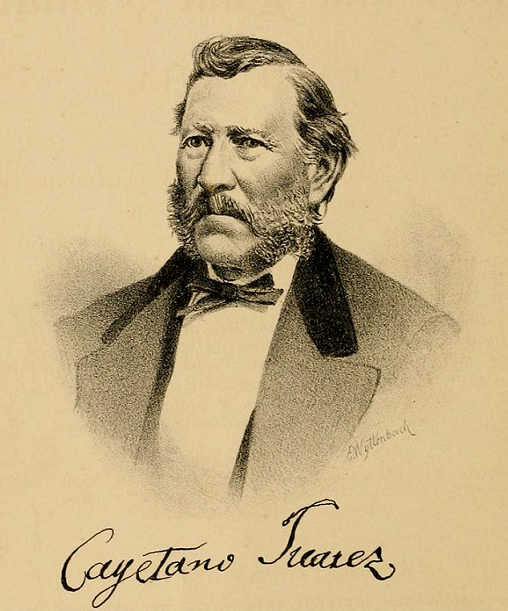
Rancho Yokaya was granted to Californio ranchero Cayetano Juárez in 1845

Rancho Yokaya (also called Llokaya) was a 35,541-acre (143.83 km^{2}) Mexican land grant in present-day Mendocino County, California, given in 1845 by Governor Pío Pico to Cayetano Juarez. The name Yokaya means 'south valley' in the language of the Pomo people. The grant extended along the Russian River from the southern end of Ukiah Valley to the northern end of Redwood Valley, from 1 to 2 mi (1.6 to 3.2 km) wide, and approximating 16 mi (26 km) in length, and encompassed present-day Ukiah.

== History ==
Spanish, then later Mexican, influence extended into Mendocino County, leading to the establishment in southern Mendocino County of Rancho Sanel at Hopland in 1844 and Rancho Yokoya in 1845.

Cayetano Juárez (1809–1883) was a soldier at Presidio of San Francisco until 1836. Juárez married María de Jesús Higuera (born 1815), daughter of Francisco Higuera, in 1835. In 1836 Juárez was made mayordomo at Sonoma. For his decade of service to the Mexican government, Juárez was granted Rancho Tulucay in present-day Napa County, California in 1840. In 1844 he was elected Alcalde of Sonoma. Although often away, Juárez resided on Rancho Tulucay until his death in 1883, and is buried in the Tulocay Cemetery in Napa, California. Juárez was granted the 8 square league Rancho Yokaya in 1845.

With the cession of California to the United States following the Mexican-American War, the 1848 Treaty of Guadalupe Hidalgo provided that the land grants would be honored. As required by the Land Act of 1851, a claim for Rancho Yokaya was filed with the Public Land Commission in 1852, but rejected by the Commission in 1854. However, on appeal it was confirmed by the District Court in 1863, and US Supreme Court in 1864, and the grant was patented to Cayetano Juárez in 1867.

James H. Burke came to California in 1853, and in 1857 he and his brother, J. W. Burke, purchased 974 acres (3.9 km^{2}) of Rancho Yokaya, extending from Robinson Creek to Burke Hill, about 2 mi (3.2 km).
