= CSS Chattahoochee =

Confederate States Navy gunboat

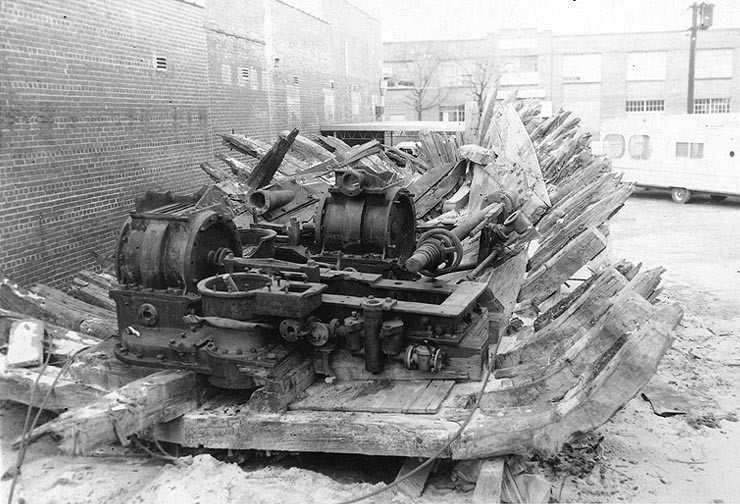
- Ship's engines and lower portion of the after hull, photographed following recovery in the vicinity of Columbus, Georgia, circa the early or middle 1960s

History

Confederate States
- Name: Chattahoochee
- Laid down: Saffold, Georgia
- In service: February 1863
- Fate: Scuttled 17 April 1865, stern raised and put on display in 1963

General characteristics
- Length: 150 ft (46 m)
- Beam: 25 ft (7.6 m)
- Draft: 8 ft (2.4 m)
- Speed: 12 knots (22 km/h; 14 mph)
- Complement: 120 officers and crew
- Armament: 4 32-pounder smoothbore cannon, a 32-pounder rifled cannon and a 9-inch smoothbore cannon
- CSS Muscogee and Chattahoochee
- U.S. National Register of Historic Places
- NRHP reference No.: 70000212
- Added to NRHP: May 13, 1970

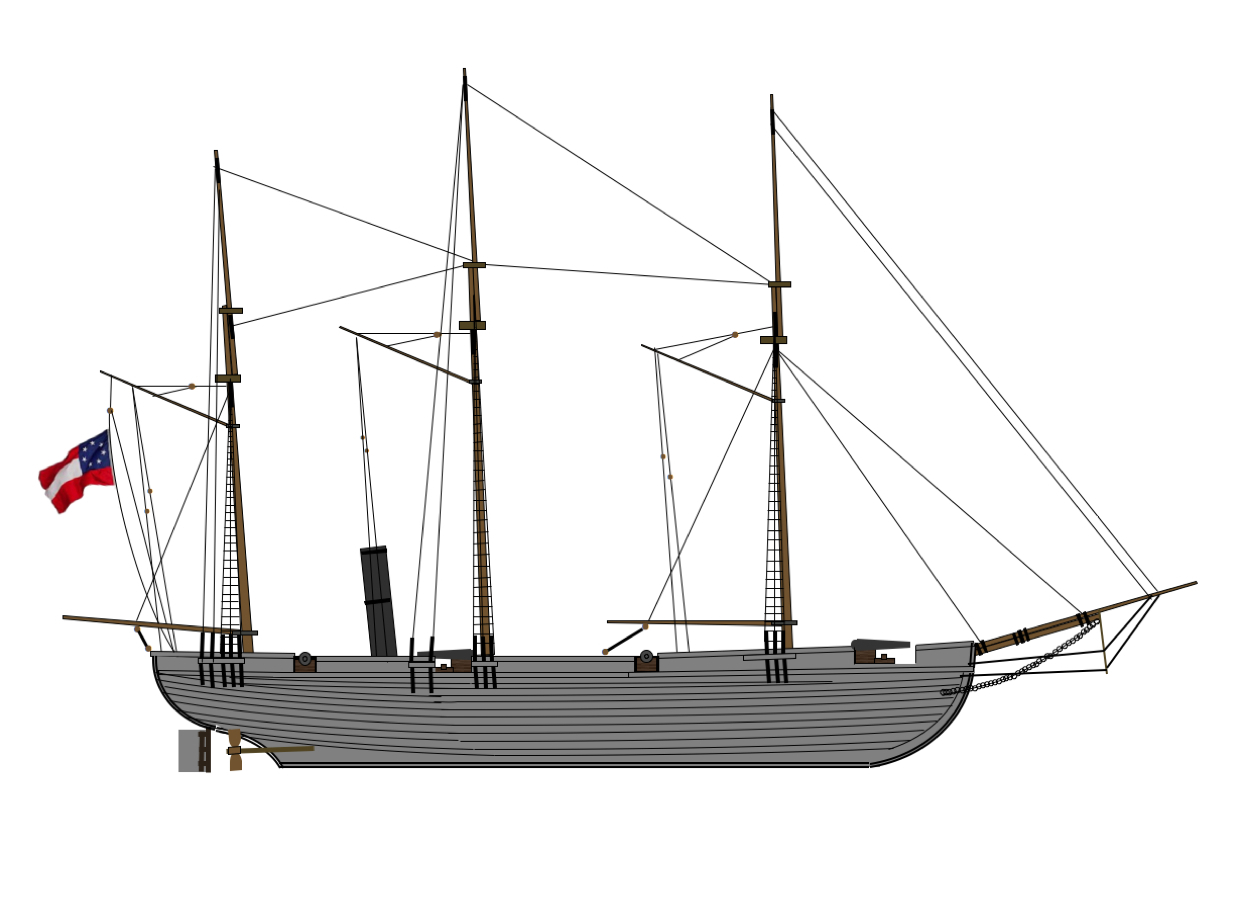
Reconstruction of CSS Chattahoochee

CSS Chattahoochee was a twin-screw steam powered gunboat built at Saffold, Georgia; she was christened for the river upon which she was built. The gunboat entered Confederate States Navy service in February 1863.

== Construction ==
Early in the American Civil War the Confederate States Navy sought a way to break the blockade imposed by the United States Navy on Apalachicola Bay, which prevented most sea-borne commerce from reaching Apalachicola, Florida, Columbus, Georgia, and other points on the Apalachicola River and its tributary, the Chattahoochee River. The plan was to build seaworthy warships near the industrial center of Columbus, and sail them downriver to Apalachicola Bay to challenge the US Navy ships on blockade duty there. In October 1861 the CS Navy contracted with David S. Johnston of Saffold, Georgia to build a gunboat. Originally expected to be completed in four months, the gunboat was finally delivered 10 months late, on December 8, 1862, still needing work. She was commissioned on February 24, 1863, as the CSS Chattahoochee. The Chattahoochee was a three-masted schooner with two steam engines, 130 feet (40 m) long, with a beam of 30 feet (9.1 m) and drawing 8 feet (2.4 m) of water at the stern. Using both engines and sails, it was capable of making a maximum of 12 knots (22 km/h; 14 mph).

Lieutenant Catesby ap Roger Jones was assigned command of the Chattahoochee in July 1862. Jones had been in charge of the conversion of the captured USS Merrimack into the iron-clad CSS Virginia, and served as lieutenant on the Virginia in her first battle. When the Virginia's captain was injured in that battle, Jones succeeded to command of the ship for her battle the next day with the USS Monitor. After arrival in Saffold, Jones was involved in getting construction of the Chattahoochee completed. He complained about the difficulty of finding supplies for the ship. By September, he had his officers assembled, but had no crew.

While the Chattahoochee was under construction, the Confederate States Army abandoned the city of Apalachicola, exposing the valleys of the Apalachicola, Chattahoochee, Flint and Chipola rivers to raids and invasions by Union forces. The governors of Alabama, Florida and Georgia appealed to the Army to protect against such invasions by placing obstacles in the Apalachicola River and installing batteries along its banks. By the time the Chattahoochee was commissioned, obstacles in the river blocked its access to Apalachicola Bay and the Gulf of Mexico. In late 1862, a chain attached to sunken rafts had been stretched across the river at the "Narrows", a series of bends in the river 36 miles (58 km) above the city of Apalachicola. The chain caught logs, trees and other debris floating down the river. By March 1, 1863, captured debris was backed up 100 yards (91 m) from the chain, thick enough for a man to walk across. Gun batteries had already been placed at Ricco's Bluff and Alum Bluff, respectively 56 and 84 miles (90 and 135 km) upstream from Apalachicola. The "Narrows" was in the middle of a swamp, but artificial mounds were built on both sides of the river for gun batteries.

== Early 1863 ==
The Chattahoochee spent the first part of 1863 shaking down, undergoing repairs and training the crew. There were constant problems with the engines, and on January 30, she hit a rock, causing a significant leak. The ship could no longer fulfill its original purpose, to sail down to the Gulf and sink or drive away the blockading US Navy ships. The ship never even made it down to the obstacle at the Narrows, where it could at least have served as a floating battery to help protect the obstacle. Although far from combat, the ship lost crew to death and desertion. In late January 1863 Lt. Jones was transferred to Texas and replaced in late February by Lt. John Julius Guthrie.

In early April 1863 the Chattahoochee sailed down the river to visit the gun batteries along the river (although not as far as the Narrows), and then took up station at the town of Chattahoochee, Florida, where the Chattahoochee River joined with the Flint River to form the Apalachicola River. In late May the U.S. Navy learned that a blockade runner, the Fashion, was loading cotton at a landing north of the city of Apalachicola. Lieutenant Commander George H. Morris, of the USS Port Royal sent three boats which seized the Fashion and took her back to the Port Royal. Lt. Guthrie received word of the Union move, and sailed the Chattahoochee down river to aid the Fashion. The Chattahoochee was stopped at a sand bar near the present-day site of Blountstown, where the water was only 7.5 feet (2.3 m) deep, too shallow for her 8 feet (2.4 m) draft. While waiting to see if the river would rise enough to allow the Chattahoochee to cross the bar, Guthrie learned that the Fashion had been captured and removed from the river, and decided to return to Chattahoochee the next day, May 27.

== Boiler explosion and final days ==
The crew began stoking the boiler, but did not pump water into it for almost two hours, and the boiler exploded at about noon. Nineteen people aboard the Chattahoochee were killed or died later from their wounds, including two or three who drowned while trying to swim to shore. Word was sent upriver, and another ship reached the wreck in the middle of that night. The dead and wounded were moved to the river banks, where they were exposed to the weather. All day on May 27 a hurricane had been moving towards the valley of the Apalachicola River. The hurricane came ashore as a category 2 storm near the city of Apalachicola around sunrise on May 28. The wounded lay on the shore unprotected from the wind and rain for more than 24 hours as the hurricane passed over. The bodies and the wounded were then taken back to Chattahoochee. The wounded did not receive competent medical care until five days after the explosion. A slow leak finally sank the Chattahoochee 40 hours after the explosion.

David Johnston, who had built the Chattahoochee, raised the sunken ship, but left it sitting at his boatyard, where much of its gear was removed. Repair of the ship at the Columbus Navy Yard finally started in December, 1863. Lt. George Washington Gift, who had served under Catesby Jones in Virginia and on the Chattahoochee, and then continued on that ship under John Guthrie, was placed in command of the Chattahoochee in March 1864. At the end of April, Gift tried to take the repaired Chattahoochee on a raid on US Navy ships near Apalachicola, but went aground, and Gift transferred to a civilian steamer. In early June Gift was ordered to return the Chattahoochee to the Columbus Navy Yard, and he and his crew were sent to Savannah, Georgia to man the CSS Waterwitch. Repairs to the Chattahoochee were never completed, and she did not return to service before the end of the war.

When the Confederates abandoned the Apalachicola River in December 1864, Chattahoochee was moved up the Chattahoochee River; she was scuttled near Columbus on 17 April 1865 to avoid capture, just as Union troops approached the city.

== Remains ==
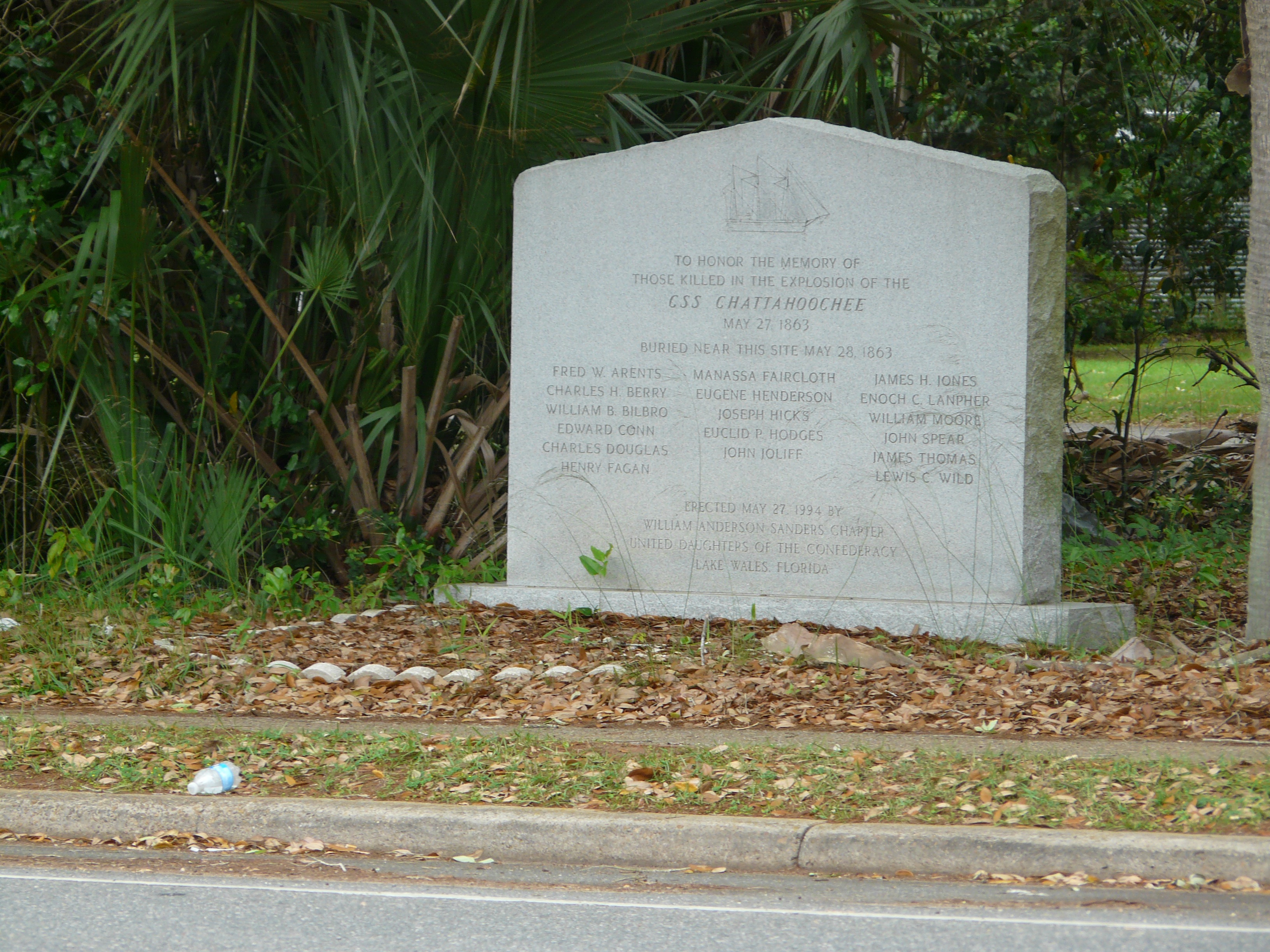
Memorial in Chattahoochee, Florida

Chattahoochee lay underwater until 1963, when her sunken remains were found within the boundaries of Fort Benning. They later were raised and a portion of her hull and her original steam engines once more returned to her home in Columbus, where they were placed on display at the National Civil War Naval Museum. Because she was scuttled and lay submerged for a century, Chattahoochee is the only Confederate Navy gunboat that survived to the modern era.

== Sources ==
- "CSS Chattahoochee". Historic Naval Ships Association. Archived from the original on October 14, 2007.
- Ware, Lynn Willoughby (Fall 1986). "Enchantment and Ennui: The Experiences of the Crew of the CSS Chattahoochee". The Georgia Historical Quarterly. 70 (3): 409–432. JSTOR 40581544.
