= Ukiah, California =

City in the United States

- City
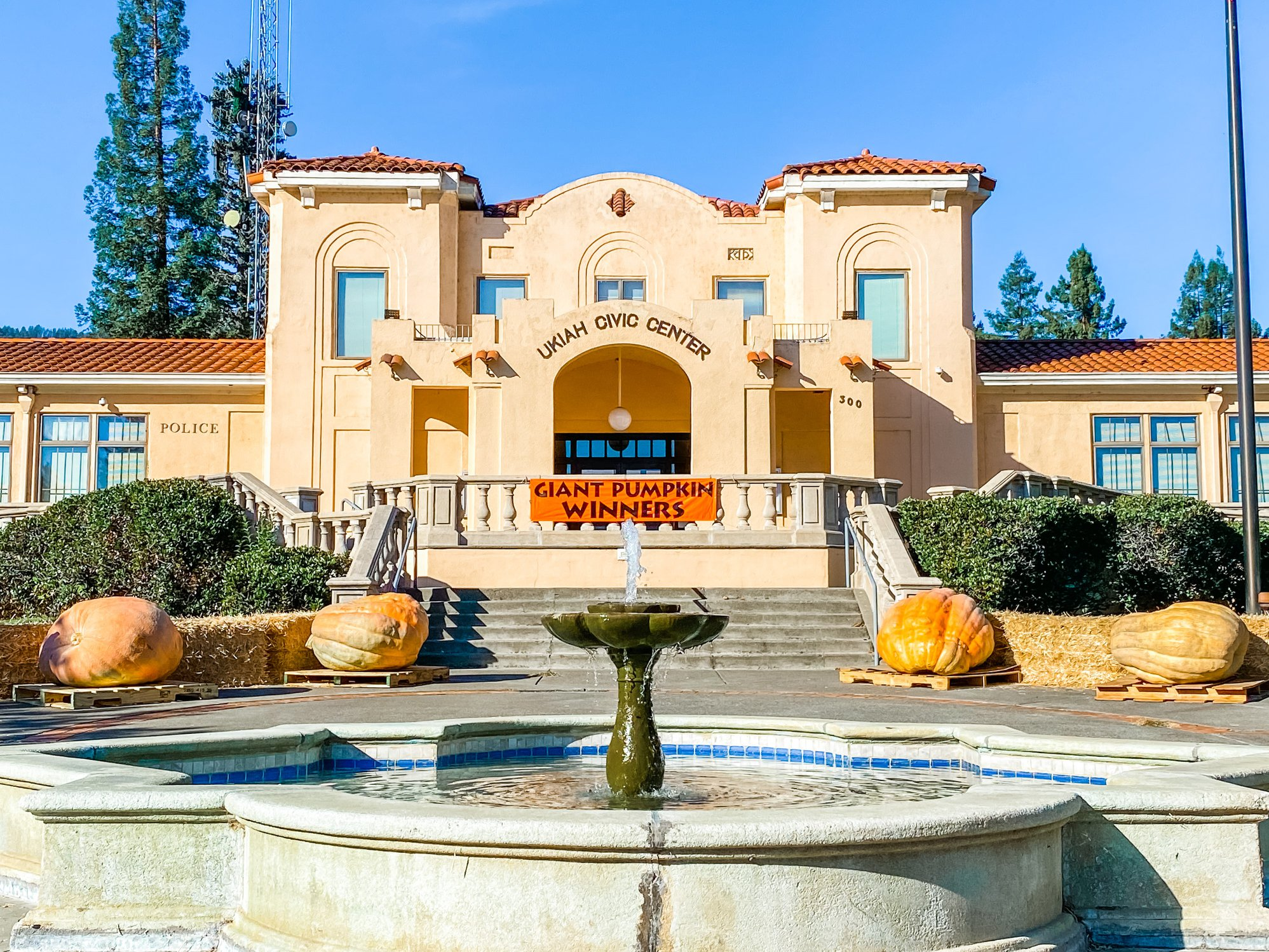
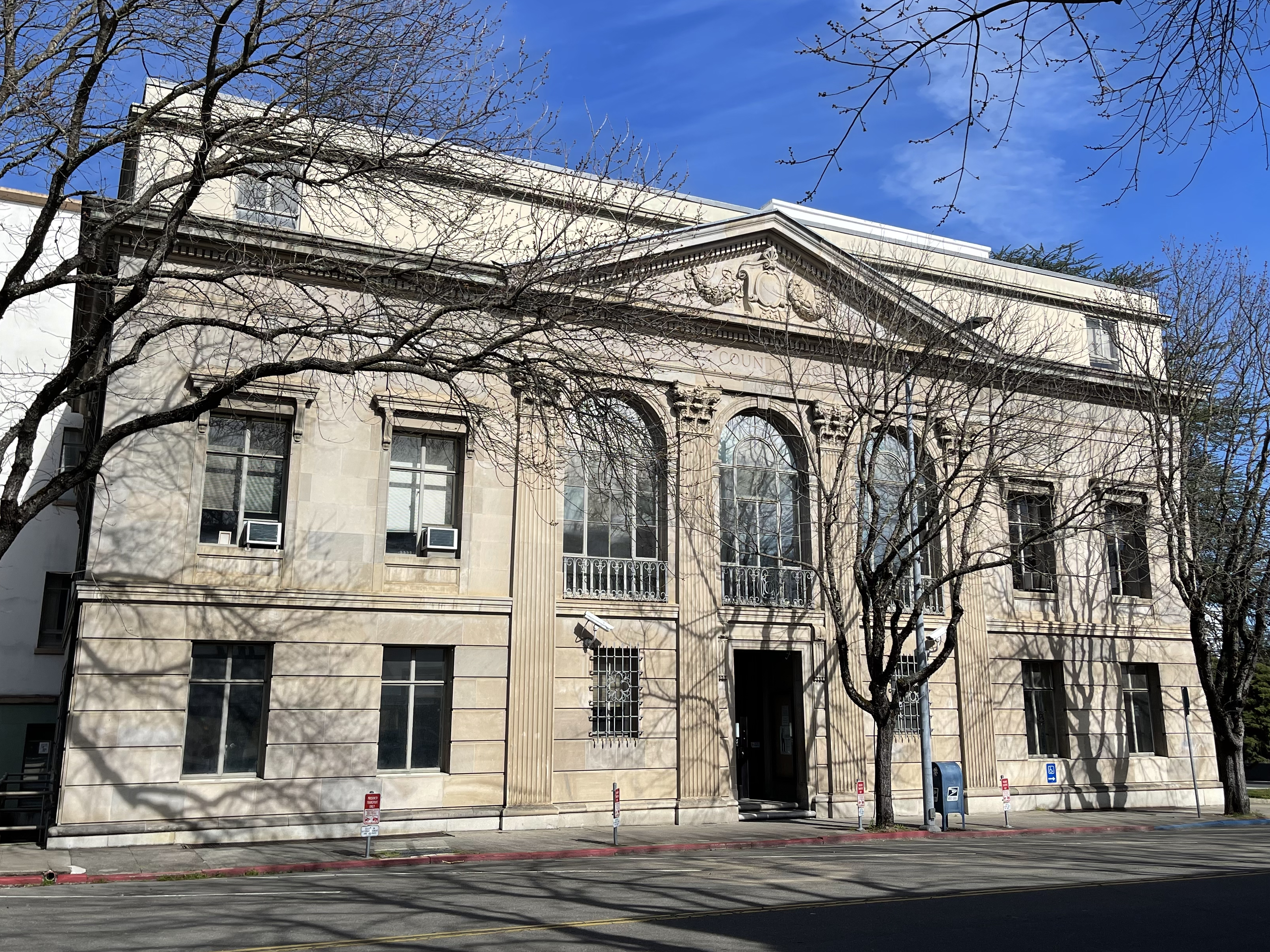
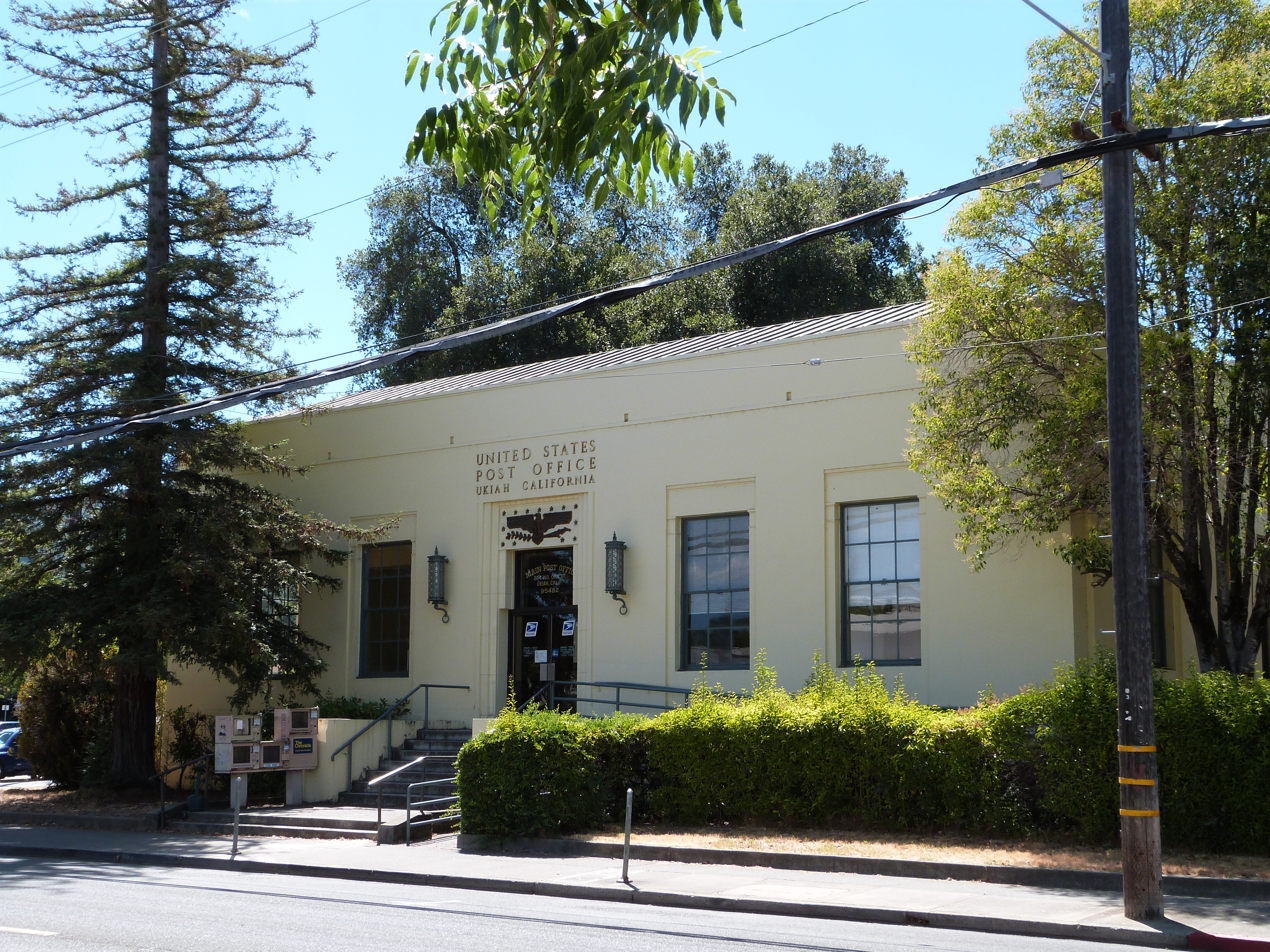
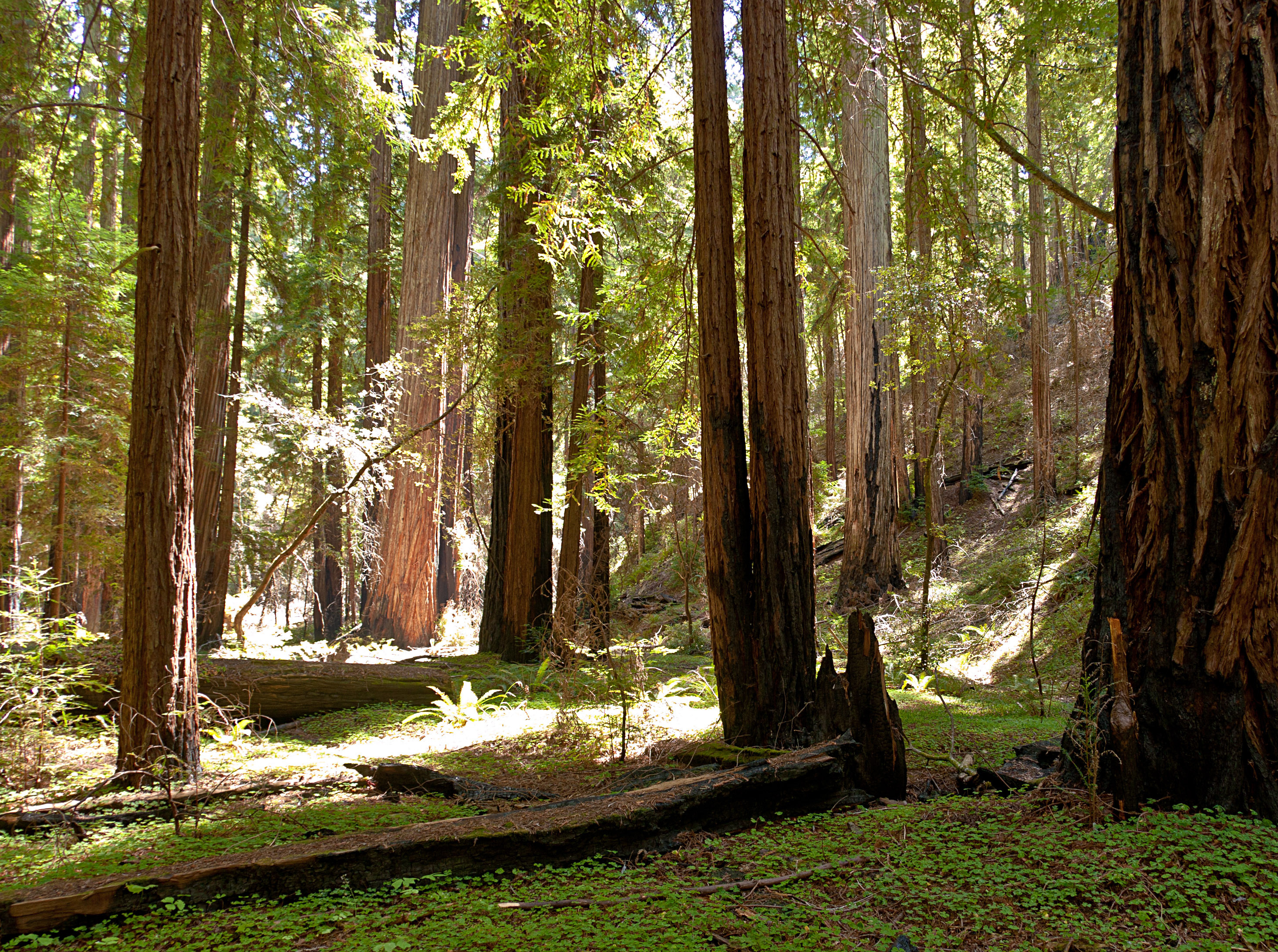
- Clockwise, from top left: Ukiah Civic Center, Mendocino County Courthouse, Montgomery Woods State Natural Reserve, historic downtown Post Office (closed 2012)

- Seal
- Interactive map of Ukiah, California
- Location within California Location within the United States
- Coordinates: 39°09′01″N 123°12′28″W
- Country: United States
- State: California
- County: Mendocino
- Incorporated: March 8, 1876

Government
  - Type: Council/Manager
  - Mayor: Susan Sher
  - City manager: Sage Sangiacomo

Area
  - Total: 4.83 sq mi (12.5 km^{2})
  - Land: 4.78 sq mi (12.4 km^{2})
  - Water: 0.04 sq mi (0.10 km^{2}) 1.11%
- Elevation: 633 ft (193 m)

Population (2020)
  - Total: 16,607
- Demonym: Ukiahan
- Time zone: UTC−8 (Pacific)
  - Summer (DST): UTC−7 (PDT)
- ZIP Codes: 95482, 95418
- Area code: 707, 369
- FIPS code: 06-81134
- GNIS feature IDs: 277623, 2412125
- Website: www.cityofukiah.com

Ukiah (/juːˈkaɪə/ yoo-KY-ə; Pomo: Yokáya, meaning "deep valley" or "south valley") is the county seat of and the largest city in Mendocino County, in the North Coast region of California. Ukiah had a population of 16,607 at the 2020 census. With its accessible location along the U.S. Route 101 corridor, Ukiah serves as the city center for Mendocino County and much of neighboring Lake County.

== History ==
Yokayo band of Pomo people in Ukiah, 1916

The region has been inhabited by the Pomo for thousands of years. The modern area of Ukiah derives its name from the Pomo village (band) of Yokáya, meaning "deep valley" or "south valley".

=== Russian era ===
Russian-American Company led by commander Ross visited Ukiah and the Russian River in 1750, during their exploration of the Alaskan Northwest and Hawaii. Eventually Point Cabrillo was visited and named by the Spanish explorers, although Cabrillo only visited San Diego Bay and never visited the point. The land was inhabited by Pomo natives who lived as hunter-gatherers until the time. Some Chinese explorers visited as well during the early times of Chinatown San Francisco and the building of the railroad lines.

=== Mexican era ===
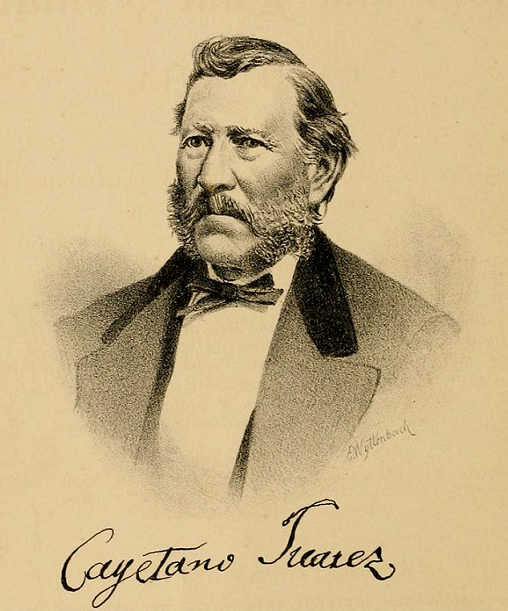
Cayetano Juárez was granted Rancho Yokaya by Governor Pío Pico in 1845.

Ukiah is located within Rancho Yokaya, one of several Spanish colonial land grants in what their colonists called Alta California. The Yokaya grant, which covered the majority of the Ukiah valley, was named for the Pomo word meaning "deep valley." The Pomo are the indigenous people who occupied the area at the time of Spanish colonization.

Later European-American settlers adopted "Ukiah" as an anglicized version of this name for the city.

Cayetano Juárez was granted Ukiah by Alta California. He was known to have a neutral relationship with the local Pomo people. He sold a southern portion of the grant (toward present-day Hopland) to the Burke brothers. The first Anglo settler in the Ukiah area was John Parker, a vaquero who worked for pioneer cattleman James Black. Black had driven his stock up the Russian River valley and took over a block of grazing land at that locale. A crude blockhouse was constructed for Parker so he could have shelter to protect the herd from the indigenous local people, who were hostile due to resentment of the squatters on their land. The blockhouse was located just south of present-day Ukiah on the banks of what was known as Wilson Creek. Following the U.S. Conquest of California, the region passed from Mexican to American sovereignty.

=== Early American era ===
In 1856, Samuel Lowry built a log cabin approximately on the corner of today's East Perkins and North Main streets. Lowery sold his claim to A.T. Perkins in the spring of 1857, and the latter moved his family into the valley. They were the first Anglo-American pioneer family of the township. Six others followed to make their home there that same year. The first United States post office opened in 1858. By 1859, the population of Ukiah had grown to about 100 people, making it a community sufficient in size to serve as the county seat. Before this, administrative duties for Mendocino County had been handled by Sonoma County.

Initially visitors could reach town only by stagecoach, or private horses. A short rail line from San Francisco terminated in Petaluma, nearly 80 miles (130 km) to the south. In 1870 the remainder of the trip to Ukiah took another two days by horse. In subsequent years the rail line was extended further northward to Cloverdale. Although the stagecoach portion was reduced to 30 miles (48 km), the community was still relatively isolated and slow to develop.

Ukiah was incorporated in 1876. It was not until 1889 that the San Francisco and North Pacific Railroad completed its line from Cloverdale to Ukiah, linking the Mendocino County seat to the national rail network.

Ukiah has been the hub of an agricultural and business community. Over the decades various commodity crops have been grown in the Ukiah Valley. They include pears, green beans, hops, apricots, and grapes. As part of California's Wine Country, grapes have become the predominant agricultural product.

Hops were once a major crop grown around Ukiah. The beer flavoring agent was first grown there in 1868 when L.F. Long of Largo grew an initial experimental crop. The climate proved suitable for the crop and production expanded, peaking in 1885. It declined in the last years of the 1880s as prices dropped. Mendocino County remained the third-largest producer of hops in the state of California in 1890, with well over 900 acres (3.6 km^{2}) under cultivation. Production continued well into the 20th century. A refurbished hop kiln can be seen at the north end of Ukiah east of Highway 101, where many of the old fields were located.

=== 20th century ===
Ukiah's 20th-century population developed in relation to the lumber boom of the late 1940s. Logging of redwoods was once a major industry. Activists have worked to preserve areas of redwood forest, which became endangered due to overlogging. Young people entered the area from the 1960s, seeking alternative lifestyles and, in some cases, artisan and rural living.

== Geography ==
Ukiah is in southeastern Mendocino County in the valley of the Russian River, a south-flowing river which reaches the Pacific in Sonoma County. Via U.S. Route 101, Ukiah is 60 miles (97 km) north of Santa Rosa and 158 miles (254 km) south of Eureka. According to the U.S. Census Bureau, the city covers an area of 4.8 square miles (12 km^{2}), of which 0.05 square miles (0.13 km^{2}), or 0.93%, are water.

=== Climate ===
Ukiah has a hot-summer Mediterranean climate (Köppen: Csa). Average rainfall for the area is 38.90 inches (988 mm) per year. Measurable precipitation occurs on an average of 77.1 days per year. The greatest monthly precipitation was 30.75 inches (781.0 mm) in January 1909 and the greatest 24-hour precipitation was 6.18 inches (157.0 mm) on December 22, 1964. The wettest "rain year" was from July 1997 to June 1998 with 72.74 inches (1,847.6 mm) and the driest from July 1976 to June 1977 with 14.20 inches (360.7 mm). Light snowfall occurs about every other year. The greatest recorded snowfall was 1.5 inches (3.8 cm) on March 2, 1976, while the most in a month was 5 inches (13 cm) in March 1896 and January 1952. Temperatures reach 90 °F (32.2 °C) on an average of 61.0 afternoons annually and 100 °F (37.8 °C) on an average of 8.7 afternoons. Due to frequent low humidity, summer temperatures normally drop into the fifties at night. Freezing temperatures occur on an average 33.6 mornings per year. The record high temperature was 117 °F (47.2 °C) on September 6, 2022, and July 6, 2024. The record low temperature was 12 °F (−11.1 °C) on January 12, 1898.

Climate data for Ukiah, California, 1991–2020 normals, extremes 1893–present
Month	Jan	Feb	Mar	Apr	May	Jun	Jul	Aug	Sep	Oct	Nov	Dec	Year
Record high °F (°C)	82 (28)	86 (30)	94 (34)	98 (37)	106 (41)	114 (46)	117 (47)	114 (46)	117 (47)	107 (42)	92 (33)	84 (29)	117 (47)
Mean maximum °F (°C)	68.7 (20.4)	74.1 (23.4)	80.6 (27.0)	86.9 (30.5)	94.1 (34.5)	101.9 (38.8)	104.6 (40.3)	104.0 (40.0)	102.8 (39.3)	93.1 (33.9)	78.4 (25.8)	67.1 (19.5)	107.4 (41.9)
Mean daily maximum °F (°C)	56.9 (13.8)	60.2 (15.7)	64.8 (18.2)	69.6 (20.9)	76.3 (24.6)	82.8 (28.2)	91.1 (32.8)	90.6 (32.6)	87.0 (30.6)	76.7 (24.8)	62.8 (17.1)	55.6 (13.1)	72.9 (22.7)
Daily mean °F (°C)	47.1 (8.4)	49.2 (9.6)	52.3 (11.3)	56.0 (13.3)	61.8 (16.6)	67.3 (19.6)	73.4 (23.0)	72.4 (22.4)	69.1 (20.6)	61.1 (16.2)	51.4 (10.8)	45.9 (7.7)	58.9 (15.0)
Mean daily minimum °F (°C)	37.4 (3.0)	38.3 (3.5)	39.7 (4.3)	42.4 (5.8)	47.3 (8.5)	51.9 (11.1)	55.6 (13.1)	54.2 (12.3)	51.3 (10.7)	45.5 (7.5)	40.0 (4.4)	36.2 (2.3)	45.0 (7.2)
Mean minimum °F (°C)	26.7 (−2.9)	29.0 (−1.7)	31.7 (−0.2)	34.0 (1.1)	38.8 (3.8)	44.7 (7.1)	49.8 (9.9)	49.1 (9.5)	43.2 (6.2)	36.3 (2.4)	29.1 (−1.6)	25.8 (−3.4)	23.8 (−4.6)
Record low °F (°C)	12 (−11)	18 (−8)	22 (−6)	23 (−5)	28 (−2)	35 (2)	39 (4)	38 (3)	30 (−1)	24 (−4)	19 (−7)	13 (−11)	12 (−11)
Average precipitation inches (mm)	7.39 (188)	6.98 (177)	5.33 (135)	2.81 (71)	1.71 (43)	0.41 (10)	0.00 (0.00)	0.05 (1.3)	0.20 (5.1)	1.95 (50)	4.11 (104)	7.96 (202)	38.90 (988)
Average precipitation days (≥ 0.01 in)	12.5	11.9	10.2	7.8	5.0	1.6	0.1	0.2	0.7	3.6	9.8	13.7	77.1
Source 1: NOAA
Source 2: National Weather Service

== Demographics ==
Historical population
Census	Pop.	Note	%±
1860	624		—
1870	966		54.8%
1880	933		−3.4%
1890	1,627		74.4%
1900	1,850		13.7%
1910	2,136		15.5%
1920	2,305		7.9%
1930	3,124		35.5%
1940	3,731		19.4%
1950	6,120		64.0%
1960	9,900		61.8%
1970	10,095		2.0%
1980	12,035		19.2%
1990	14,599		21.3%
2000	15,497		6.2%
2010	16,075		3.7%
2020	16,607		3.3%
2025 (est.)	16,068	▼	−3.2%
U.S. Decennial Census 1870 Census

=== Racial and ethnic composition ===
Race and Ethnicity
Racial and ethnic composition	2000	2010	2020
White (non-Hispanic)	72.4%	62.87%	54.04%
Hispanic or Latino (of any race)	19.31%	27.73%	32.78%
Two or more races (non-Hispanic)	2.57%	2.84%	5.56%
Asian (non-Hispanic)	1.64%	2.46%	3.0%
Native American (non-Hispanic)	3.03%	2.75%	2.9%
Black or African American (non-Hispanic)	0.89%	0.98%	1.04%
Other (non-Hispanic)	0.06%	0.19%	0.54%
Pacific Islander (non-Hispanic)	0.09%	0.16%	0.16%

=== 2020 census ===
As of the 2020 census, Ukiah had a population of 16,607. The population density was 3,471.4 inhabitants per square mile (1,340.3/km^{2}). The median age was 38.2 years. The age distribution was 23.2% under the age of 18, 8.2% aged 18 to 24, 27.4% aged 25 to 44, 22.6% aged 45 to 64, and 18.7% who were 65 years of age or older. For every 100 females, there were 93.2 males, and for every 100 females age 18 and over there were 91.2 males age 18 and over.

The census reported that 96.2% of the population lived in households, 1.7% lived in non-institutionalized group quarters, and 2.1% were institutionalized. In addition, 99.9% of residents lived in urban areas, while 0.1% lived in rural areas.

There were 6,584 households, out of which 30.9% included children under the age of 18, 34.9% were married-couple households, 8.2% were cohabiting couple households, 20.9% had a male householder with no spouse or partner present, and 36.0% had a female householder with no spouse or partner present. About 35.5% of households were one person, and 18.2% were one person aged 65 or older. The average household size was 2.43. There were 3,753 families (57.0% of all households).

There were 6,952 housing units at an average density of 1,453.2 units per square mile (561.1 units/km^{2}), of which 6,584 (94.7%) were occupied. Of these, 42.7% were owner-occupied, and 57.3% were occupied by renters. Of all housing units, 5.3% were vacant; the homeowner vacancy rate was 1.3% and the rental vacancy rate was 3.8%.

=== 2023 estimates ===
In 2023, the US Census Bureau estimated that 13.3% of the population were foreign-born. Of all people aged 5 or older, 73.9% spoke only English at home, 21.9% spoke Spanish, 1.3% spoke other Indo-European languages, 2.9% spoke Asian or Pacific Islander languages, and 0.0% spoke other languages. Of those aged 25 or older, 84.4% were high school graduates and 22.9% had a bachelor's degree.

The median household income was $67,122, and the per capita income was $36,541. About 10.7% of families and 16.3% of the population were below the poverty line.

== Economy ==
Major employers in Ukiah include:

- Mendocino County
- Ukiah Valley Medical Center
- Walmart
- Granite Construction
- The Home Depot
- Lucky
- FedEx

=== Major products ===
Ukiah is known for wine production. Some very large production wineries, including Brutocao, Fife, Parducci, Frey, and Bonterra, have become established here since the late 20th century.

Ukiah was previously a major producer of pears. Alex R. Thomas & Company owned hundreds of acres of Bartlett pear orchards on the east side of the Ukiah Valley. For nearly 90 years, many local residents and migrant workers have been employed packing the pears for domestic and foreign consumption. On December 1, 2008, the company announced it would be shutting down major operations at the end of the year due to bankruptcy. Several acres of orchard have been torn down and replaced with vineyards since the packing shed closed its doors. As of 2011, the main facility was slated to reopen as a composting and trash-sorting facility.

== Arts and culture ==
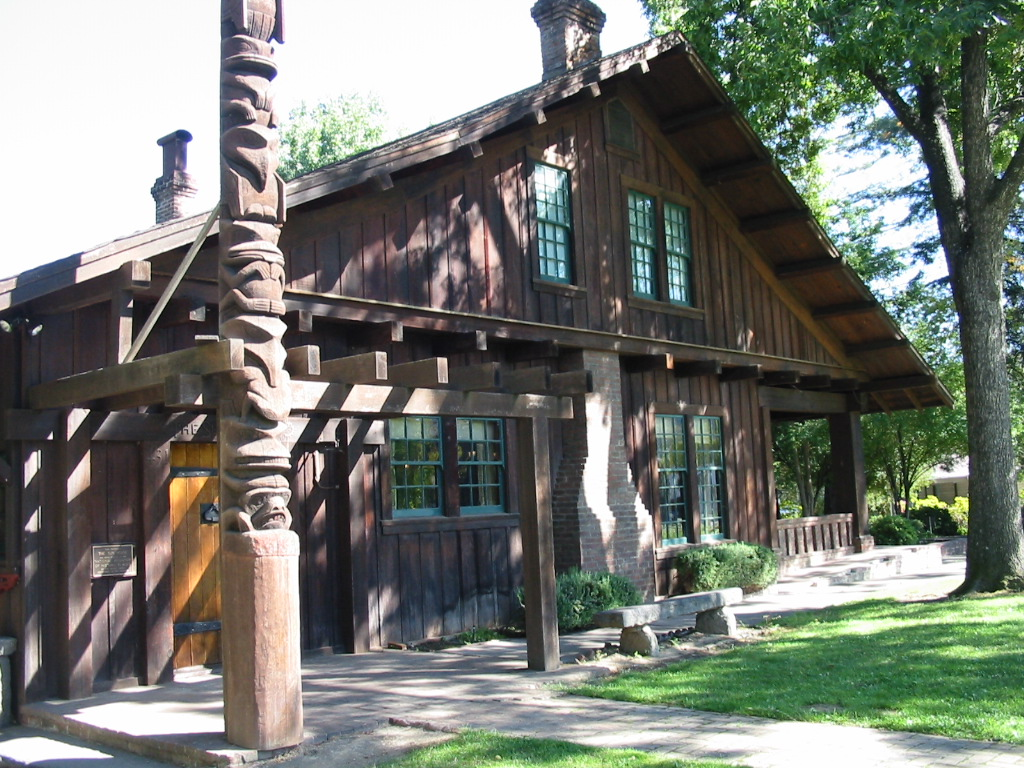
Grace Hudson's Sun House, designed by Grace and John Hudson c. 1911 in the Craftsman style

Institutions of the arts include:

- SPACE – School of Performing Arts and Cultural Education
- Ukiah Players Theatre
- The Mendocino Ballet
- Ukiah Civic Light Opera
- Grace Hudson Museum
- Ukiah Symphony Orchestra
- Ukiah Community Concert Association
- The Spring House

=== Recreation ===
- Alex R. Thomas Plaza
- Gardner Park
- Giorno Park
- Great Redwood Trail
- Low Gap Park
- McGarvey Park
- Oak Manor Park
- Observatory Park
- Orchard Park
- Riverside Park
- Todd Grove Park
- Ukiah Skate Park
- Ukiah Sports Complex
- Vinewood Park

== Government ==
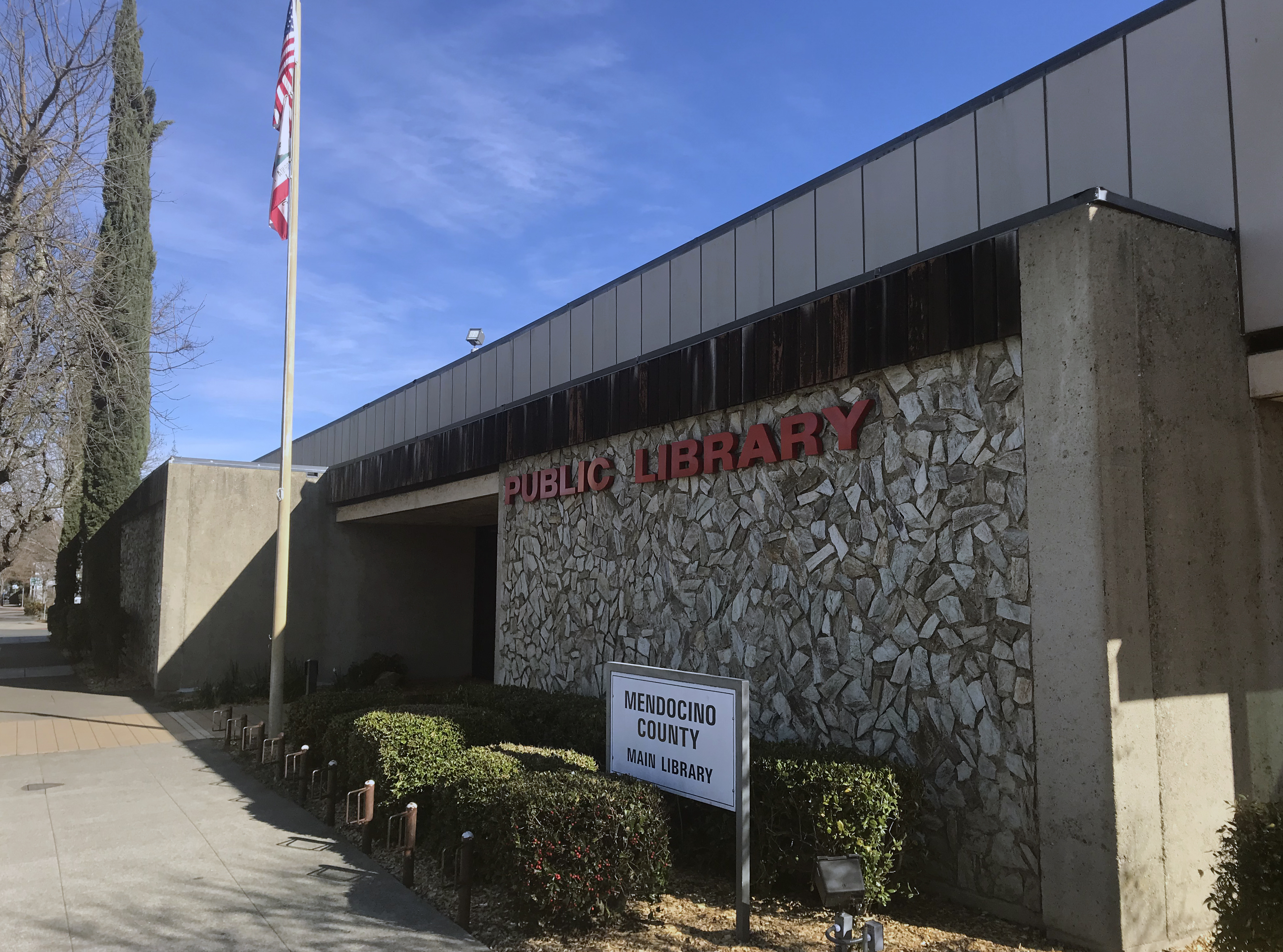
Mendocino County Main Library

Ukiah uses a council–manager form of government in which policy is set by a five-member city council, elected at-large to four-year terms. The council appoints both the mayor and the city manager.

- Mayor until December 2026 – Susan Sher (appointed by council based on seniority for a one-year term)
- City council:
  - Juan Orozco, Vice Mayor
  - Heather Criss, Council Member
  - Mari Rodin, Council Member
  - Douglas Crane, Council Member
- City Manager – Sage Sangiacomo
- City Treasurer – Allen Carter
- City Clerk – Kristine Lawler (appointed)
- City Attorney – Darcy Vaughn

In the California State Legislature, Ukiah is in the 2nd senatorial district, represented by Democrat Mike McGuire, and the 2nd Assembly district, represented by Democrat Chris Rogers.

In the United States House of Representatives, Ukiah is in California's 2nd congressional district, represented by Democrat Jared Huffman.

The tribal headquarters of both the Pinoleville Pomo Nation and the Potter Valley Tribe are in Ukiah.

== Transportation ==
The Amtrak Thruway 7 bus provides daily connections to/from Ukiah (with a curbside stop at 397 North Orchard Avenue) and Martinez to the south, to/from Arcata to the north. Additional Amtrak connections are available from Martinez station.

== Education ==
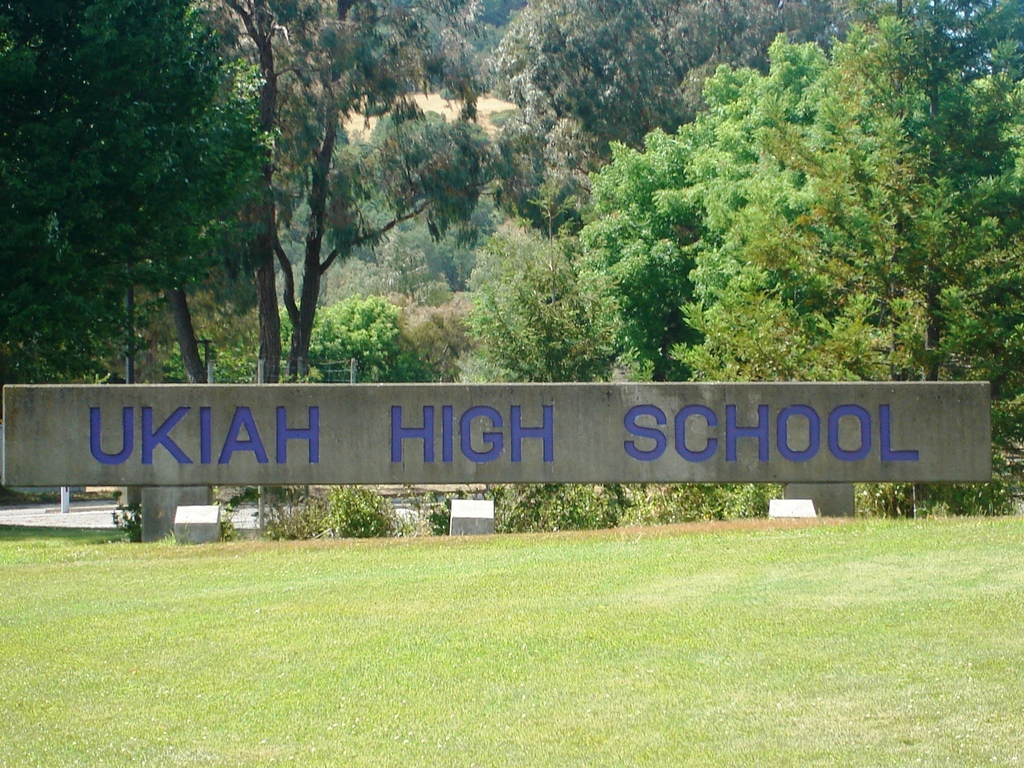
Ukiah High School sign

=== Ukiah Unified School District ===
- Ukiah High School
- Calpella Elementary School
- Eagle Peak Middle School (Redwood Valley)
- Nokomis Elementary School
- Oak Manor Elementary School
- Pomolita Middle School
- South Valley High School
- Yokayo Elementary School
- Frank Zeek Elementary School
- Tree of Life Montessori Charter School
- Grace Hudson Elementary School
- River Oak Charter School
- Ukiah Independent Study Academy
- Calpella Preschool
- Preschool Village
- Small Wonders State Preschool
- Yokayo State Preschool
- Ukiah Adult School

=== Other K–12 schools ===
- Sequoia Career Academy
- Redwood Collegiate Academy
- Deep Valley Christian School
- Ukiah Junior Academy
- Instilling Goodness / Developing Virtue School
- St. Mary of the Angels Catholic School

=== Former K–12 schools ===
- Trinity School for Children (closed as of July 31, 2009)

=== Colleges ===
- Mendocino College
- Dharma Realm Buddhist University

== Notable people ==
- AFI lead vocalist Davey Havok, guitarist Jade Puget, drummer Adam Carson, and tour managers Jake MacLachlan and Smith Puget were all raised in Ukiah. Original-lineup guitarist Mark Stopholese and bassist Vic Chalker were also raised there.
- Phoebe Bridgers, three-time Grammy-nominated singer, spent part of her childhood in Ukiah.
- Ed Burke, U.S. Olympic hammer thrower
- Aurelius O. Carpenter, photographer
- Melissa Chaty, beauty queen, Miss California in 2008
- McKenna Faith, singer-songwriter
- Shiloh Fernandez, actor, born and raised in Ukiah
- Robben Ford, blues guitarist, raised in Ukiah
- Casey Frey, social media comedian and dancer, born and raised in Ukiah
- Sally Miller Gearhart, feminist and lesbian author and activist, died in Ukiah
- Grace Hudson, museum founder, collector of Pomo artifacts, commercial portrait photographer The Grace Hudson Museum in Ukiah is named for her and houses her collections.
- Leonard Lake, serial killer, lived near Ukiah in the early 1980s
- Mary McNair Mathews (1834–1903), Nevada historian, died in Ukiah
- Darrell McClure, cartoonist of Little Annie Rooney and illustrator, born in Ukiah to painter Ethel Jameson Docker
- Don Mossi, Major League Baseball pitcher for several teams
- Holly Near, singer-songwriter, born in Ukiah
- Nick 13, lead singer of Tiger Army, raised in Ukiah
- Hal Perry, professional basketball player and civil-rights lawyer, raised in Ukiah
- Bay Raitt, animator and video game designer known for developing Gollum's facial modeling in the Lord of the Rings films and various other works
- Aaron Rodgers, National Football League quarterback, spent four years of his childhood in Ukiah
- Carl Sassenrath, architect of operating systems and computer languages, created the Amiga computer operating system in 1985, later worked at Apple, subsequently moved to and runs his own company at his Ukiah ranch
- William Harrison Standley, Chief of Naval Operations and later U.S. Ambassador to the Soviet Union, born in Ukiah
- Gary Scott Thompson, television and film screenwriter and producer, graduated from Ukiah High School in 1977
- Rick Warren, pastor, author and Ukiah High School graduate

== In popular culture ==
- "Ukiah" is the name and subject of a song on the 1973 Doobie Brothers album The Captain and Me.
- "Ukiah" is the name and subject of the fifth song from Robert Francis' album Heaven.
- Ukiah is featured prominently in C.D. Payne's novel Youth in Revolt.
- Ukiah is one of six original locations of an International Latitude Observatory.
- Competing in the men's Division III club level bracket, the Mendocino Steam Donkeys Rugby Football Club rugby union team, based in the Ukiah area, are the first official NCRFU team in the county.
- Ukiah was the initial home in California of Peoples Temple.
- Ukiah's newspaper is the Ukiah Daily Journal.
- Ukiah was named in the 1987 Dragnet film as being where Frank Smith, Joe Friday's partner, moved to after quitting the force and buying a goat farm.

== See also ==
- Pomo people
