= Tuluka, California =

Patwin village in Napa County, California

Tuluka (or Tulucay; Re-ho, Tu-lo-kai-di-sel, Tulkays) is a former Patwin village in Napa County, California, United States. It was located southeast of Napa, but its precise location is unknown.

Clinton Hart Merriam suggests that it may be identified with the town of Napa, and formed part of the northern boundary of the Pooewin, a group "always at war with the Patwin". He notes the former existence of a Too-loo'-kah ranchería "a short distance southeast of Napa", later owned by Cayetano Juárez as part of Rancho Tulucay and then the site of an asylum (presumably the Napa State Hospital). Merriam also questioned whether the people of the Too-loo'-kah ranchería were indigenous to Napa, or whether they might have been brought there from somewhere else by the Spanish.

Alfred Kroeber states that the name of the place means "red".
