= Latendorf =

- Municipality
- Coat of arms

- Location of Latendorf within Segeberg district
- Interactive map of Latendorf
- Location within Germany Location within Schleswig-Holstein
- Coordinates: 53°59′50″N 10°3′47″E
- Country: Germany
- State: Schleswig-Holstein
- District: Segeberg
- Municipal assoc.: Boostedt-Rickling

Government
  - Mayor: Torsten Hamann

Area
  - Total: 17.94 km^{2} (6.93 sq mi)
- Elevation: 42 m (138 ft)

Population (2025-12-31)
  - Total: 597
  - Density: 33.3/km^{2} (86.2/sq mi)
- Time zone: UTC+01:00 (CET)
  - Summer (DST): UTC+02:00 (CEST)
- Postal codes: 24598
- Dialling codes: 04320, 04393
- Vehicle registration: SE

Latendorf is a municipality in the district of Segeberg, in Schleswig-Holstein, Germany.

== Notable people ==
Latendorf is the birthplace of Henry William Heisch, a Private who served in the United States Marine Corps aboard the cruiser USS Newark (C-1) during the Boxer Rebellion and was awarded the Medal of Honor for actions in Tientsin, China on 20 June 1900.
