= Mendocino Steam Donkeys Rugby Football Club =

US rugby union club, based in Ukiah, CA

Founded in 2006, the Mendocino Steam Donkey Rugby Football Club is the first official Northern California Rugby Football Union team in Mendocino County. Based in Ukiah, California, the team is county-wide.

The men's side competes seasonally in Division III of the Northern California Rugby Football Union (NCRFU), a division of USA Rugby. Each year the Steam Donkeys play 12 matches in the division III northern California league against Redding, Humboldt County, San Francisco, Santa Rosa, Napa, and Yreka.

== Club logo ==
The Steam Donkey moniker is based on a steam-powered winch, or logging engine, as a tribute to the logging history of Mendocino County. It also conveys the hard-hitting style of play the club is known for.

== History ==
Founded in 2005, the Mendocino Steam Donkeys Rugby Club started with only eight players. Outside of a few veteran players, many new players did not even know the basic rules of rugby, but with several practices devoted to the intricacies of the sport, that soon changed. Over the years, word about the club spread around the county, sparking interest and bringing players not only from Ukiah, which is the main hub of the club, but from outlying communities as well, from Potter Valley to Willits, Boonville to Hopland, Fort Bragg and Mendocino, stretching as far as Lake County. The Mendocino Steam Donkeys Rugby Club played their first game in 2006.

== Community outreach ==
The club is known for community engagement - especially working with children. In 2013, the club partnered with the Mendocino County Library to promote children's literacy through "Rugby Reads" where the players read to children. Also in 2013, the club collected toys for underprivileged children, donating them to the Ukiah Valley Christmas Effort as part of a coalition with service club, the Active 20-30 Club of Ukiah, and roller derby teams Mendo Mayhem and Deep Valley Belligerents.
