= George Washington Gift =

American naval officer and businessman

George Washington Gift (1833–1879), was a U.S. Navy officer, writer, banker, civil engineer, politician, Confederate Navy officer, businessman, and newspaper editor.

== Early life ==
A native of Tennessee, he was born near Nashville, Tennessee, March 1, 1833. Gift entered the United States Naval Academy at Annapolis, Maryland, 1846. Following his graduation he was assigned as a midshipman to the Pacific Squadron, in 1848. He resigned from the U.S. Naval service, in 1852 and settled in California. In 1854, he published "The Settler's Guide" about California's land laws. It contained the preemption laws, and laws of Congress in relation to locating school land warrants; also, the swamp land act, and a synopsis of the state law on the same subject, together with the military bounty land act, with forms etc., for locating and assigning the warrants. He established a banking business in Sacramento, California, then moved to Southern California and became a civil engineer and also represented Los Angeles County in the state legislature.

== Civil War ==
In mid-February 1861, Los Angeles County Judge Dryden approved a petition presented by Gift and others to open enrollment for a volunteer militia company. Gift chaired the first meeting of the pro-Confederate "Los Angeles Mounted Rifles" company, then about 80-85 men, on March 17, 1861.

Soon after the outbreak of the Civil War, Federal troops were sent into Los Angeles and Gift escaped to the east with the Los Angeles Mounted Rifles, riding through the southern deserts, with hostile Apache and Union patrols searching for them, to Mesilla, the new capital of Confederate Arizona Territory. For his role in organizing the Rifles, he was hanged in effigy in Sacramento as a traitor in August 1861.

Leaving the Rifles, he entered the Confederate Army, and then the Confederate Navy, where he was commissioned acting master in December 1861, where he commanded a floating battery at Columbus, Kentucky. He was appointed lieutenant, March 18, 1862, serving at New Orleans on the CSS Louisiana. Following the Battle of Forts Jackson and St. Philip and prior to the surrender of Fort Jackson and Fort St. Philip, April 28, 1862, he was given permission by his immediate commander, John K. Mitchell, to abandon his vessel and to try and escape capture. He was then sent aboard the CSS Arkansas, at Memphis, Tennessee, and slightly wounded in action, July 15, 1862, during the ram's passage through the Federal fleet, above Vicksburg. He participated in the taking of the USS Underwriter, at Newbern, North Carolina. He was then stationed aboard the CSS Chattahoochee, in 1863, as a lieutenant and married Miss Shackleford, of Florida.

Gift was detached from the CSS Chattahoochee, May 18, 1863, and ordered to proceed to Mobile, Alabama, for duty aboard the CSS Baltic. When he reported at this station, June 8, 1863, he was immediately ordered aboard the CSS Gaines. He served on that ship from July to September of 1863. He was ordered, September 18, 1863, to proceed to Wilmington, North Carolina, to await orders from the Navy Department, reporting there for duty on October 4, 1863. Lt. Gift was sent to a conference in Montreal, Canada in mid October of 1863. He went by ship to Halifax, Nova Scotia and then via Quebec to Montreal. He was there also in November and December in service of the Confederacy. Gift was later involved in the Johnson's Island Expedition in late 1863. He was then appointed 1st lieutenant, Provisional Navy, from January 6, 1864, and ordered to report aboard the CSS Savannah. Sent to the Naval station at Charleston, then ordered to proceed back to Columbus, Georgia, on February 15, 1864.

Next he was sent to command his old ship, the CSS Chattahoochee, from March 1864 until July 1864. Carman Frazee, who had been with Gift in the "Rifles" also joined the Confederate Navy, and in April 1864 was appointed by Gift as a master's mate on the CSS Chattahoochee. Gift was then involved in a failed attempt to capture the USS Adela, at St. George's Sound, Florida, in May 1864. On July 5, 1864, he was sent to the Savannah squadron, for torpedo-placing duties. Gift reported sick that same month and did not return to duty before the end of the war.

== After the Civil War ==
Following the Civil War, Gift lived in Georgia and Tennessee and was an active contributor to several agricultural journals, writing on various topics pertaining to bringing in Chinese labor to relieve the agricultural labor shortage in the South. He had first hoped to appeal to subscribers in Georgia and to introduce Chinese through the port of Savannah. Disappointed there, he moved to reside in Memphis, Tennessee, and had more success, getting various subscribers to organize the Arkansas Emigration Company.

In July 1869, he left for San Francisco, and then China, to arrange for Chinese laborers, in the interest of the Arkansas Emigration Company. He returned to California in 1874, settling in the Napa Valley, where he edited newspapers, the Napa Weekly Reporter and Napa County Recorder. He died February 11, 1879, while serving as editor of the Napa City Reporter. He was buried at Tulocay Cemetery, Napa, California.

== Sources ==
- Armistead, Gene C. (2003). "California's Confederate Militia: The Los Angeles Mounted Rifles".
- Register of Officers of the Confederate States Navy, 1861–1865. Washington, DC: Government Printing Office, 1931. Information on both Gift and Frazee.
- J. M. Scammell, Military Units in Southern California, 1853-1862, California Historical Society Quarterly, Vol XXIX, No. 3, 1950
- CSS Chattahoochee Muster Roll
- Compiled by Terry Foenander, CONFEDERATE NAVAL AND MARINE CORPS PERSONNEL, A - G. George Washington Gift
