= Mary McNair Mathews =

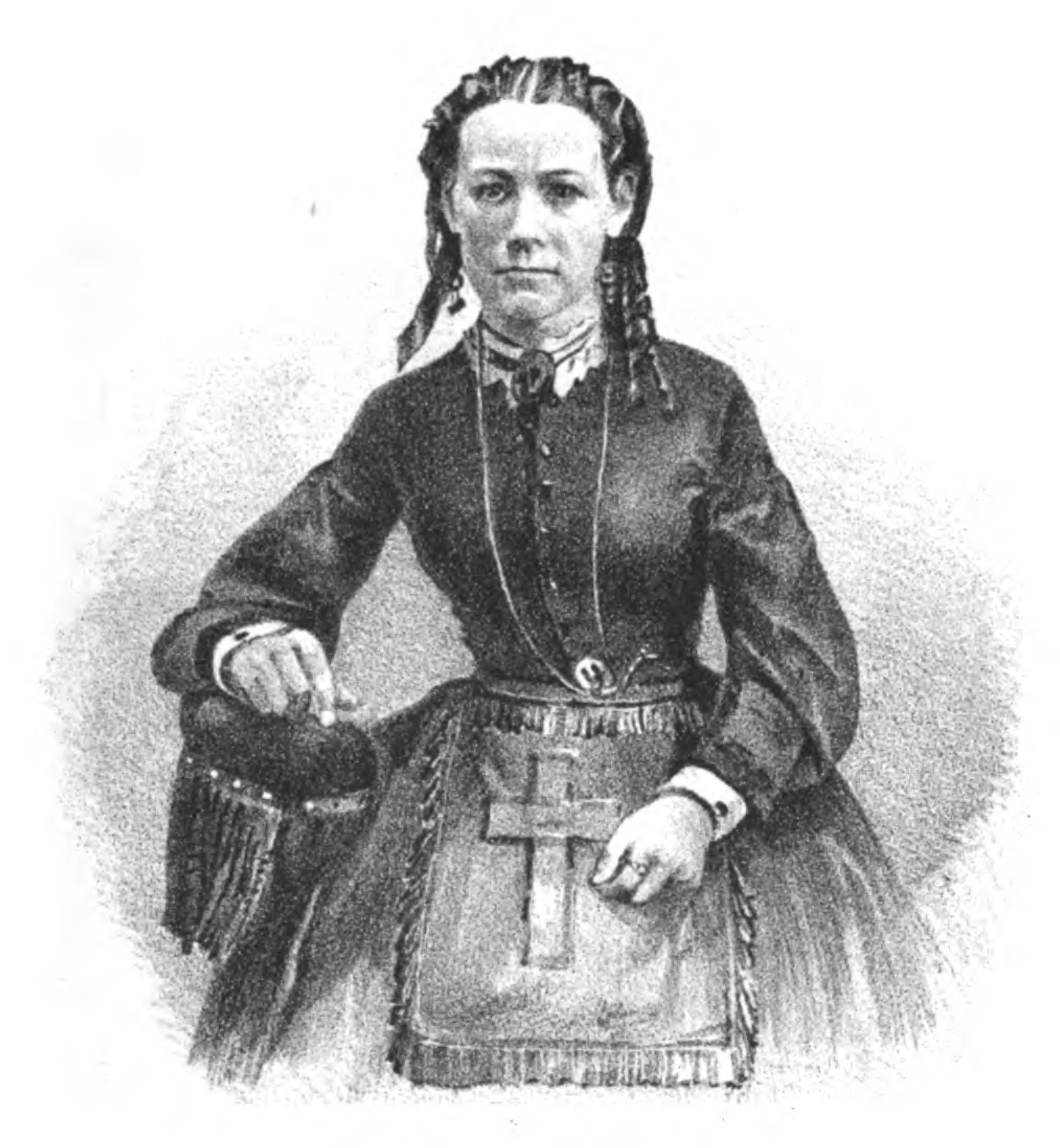
- Mathews in 1880
- Born: 1834; Livingston County, New York
- Died: 1903 (aged 68–69); Ukiah, California
- Scientific career
- Fields: Nevada history

Signature
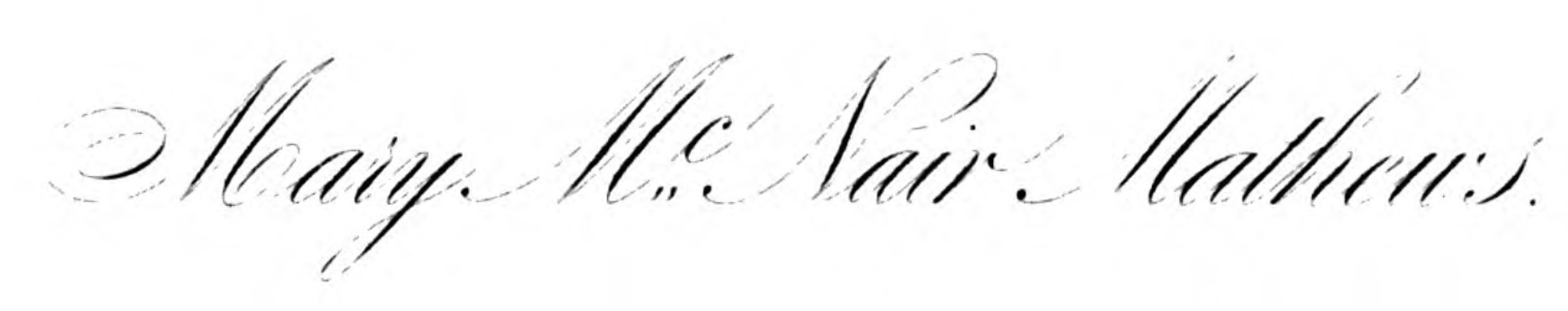

Mary McNair Mathews (1834–1903) was a Nevada historian. Her memoir and early chronicle of life in Virginia City, Nevada, Ten Years in Nevada or Life on the Pacific Coast, was published in 1880.

She was born in Livingston County, New York in 1834. Widowed early, and learning of her brother's death in Virginia City, she sold her hoop skirt factory and left for Nevada in 1869 with her young son. Once in Virginia City, she ran a laundry business, a school, a boardinghouse, and a soup kitchen; she invested in stocks.

Mathews returned to New York in 1878, published her memoir two years later, and then headed back to the west to be with her son. She died in Ukiah, California in 1903.

In 2009, a chautauqua of her life was staged at the Dangberg Home Ranch Historic Park in Minden, Nevada.
