= Cayetano Juárez Adobe =

- U.S. National Register of Historic Places
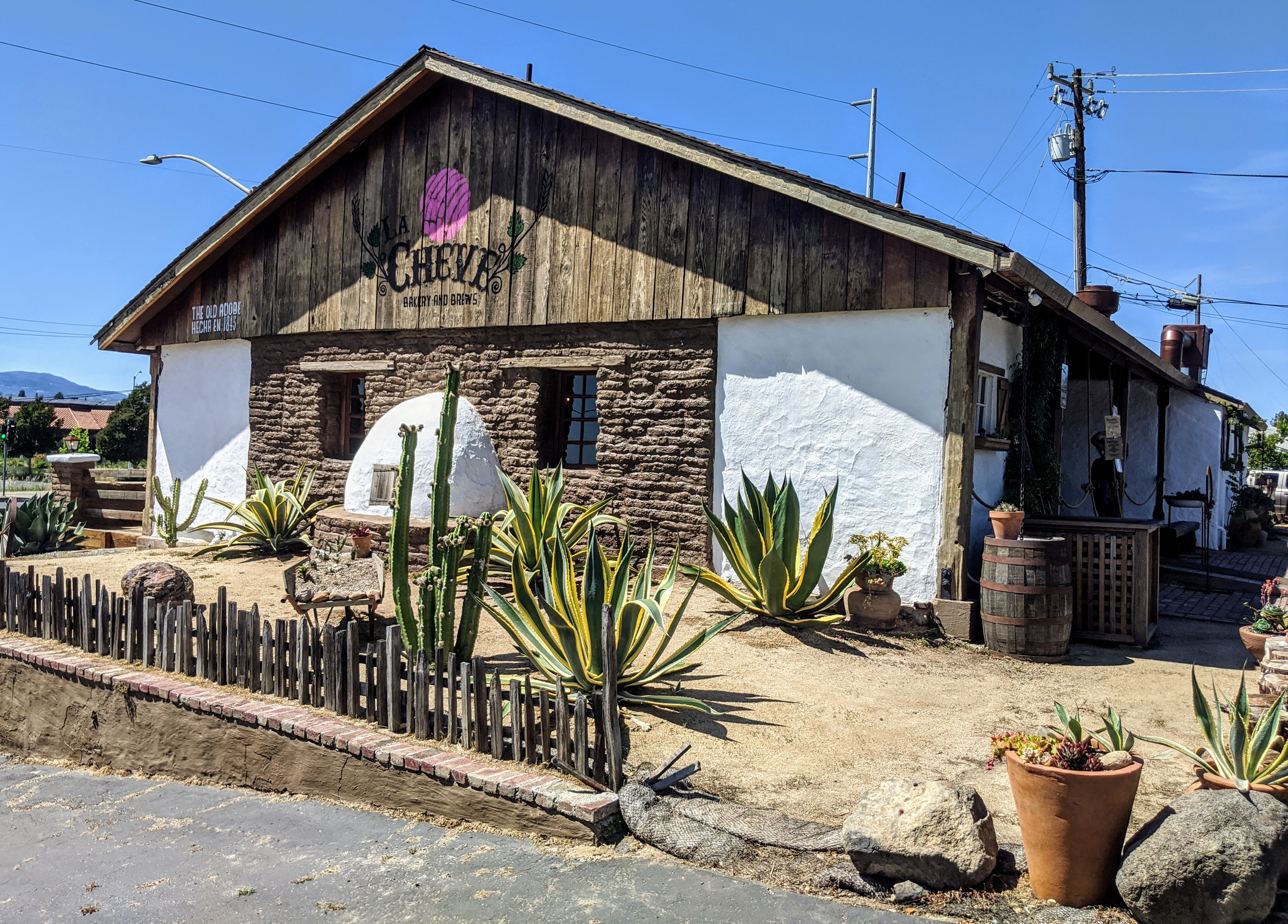

- Location within California Location within the United States
- Location: 376 Soscol Ave., Napa, California
- Coordinates: 38.2883°N 122.275°W
- Built: 1845
- Built by: Cayetano Juárez
- Architectural style: Spanish Colonial architecture
- NRHP reference No.: 15000122
- Added to NRHP: 2015

The Cayetano Juárez Adobe, often called locally the Old Adobe, is the oldest building in Napa, California. Built in 1845 by early Californio settler Cayetano Juárez, the structure was originally a family house and was later converted to a restaurant and bar. After an ownership change in 2014, it underwent an extensive restoration which was completed in 2019. The building was added to the National Register of Historic Places in 2015. It is currently the home of a Mexican restaurant.

== Builder ==
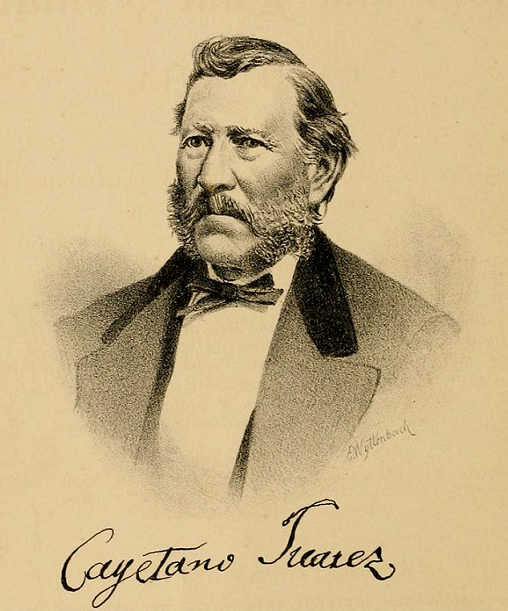
Californio ranchero and soldier, Cayetano Juárez.

Cayetano Juárez (1809–1883) was a Californio soldier in the Mexican Army, and later a Mexican government official. He received a land grant, Rancho Tulucay in the Napa Valley in 1840, where he kept herds of cattle and horses. He built his original adobe home at his rancho in 1840, which is no longer standing. In 1845, he built this larger adobe house, which still stands. Juraez employed about 400 Native American workers raising cattle and field crops on his surrounding land, and his children were raised speaking the local Native American Patwin language. His descendants were active in Napa Valley civic affairs for five generations.

== Construction ==
The building is located less than half a mile east of the Napa River in what is now the city of Napa, California. It is at the beginning of the Silverado Trail, the first permanent road established in 1852 between Napa and Calistoga, California, which is near various mercury mines on the slopes of Mount Saint Helena.

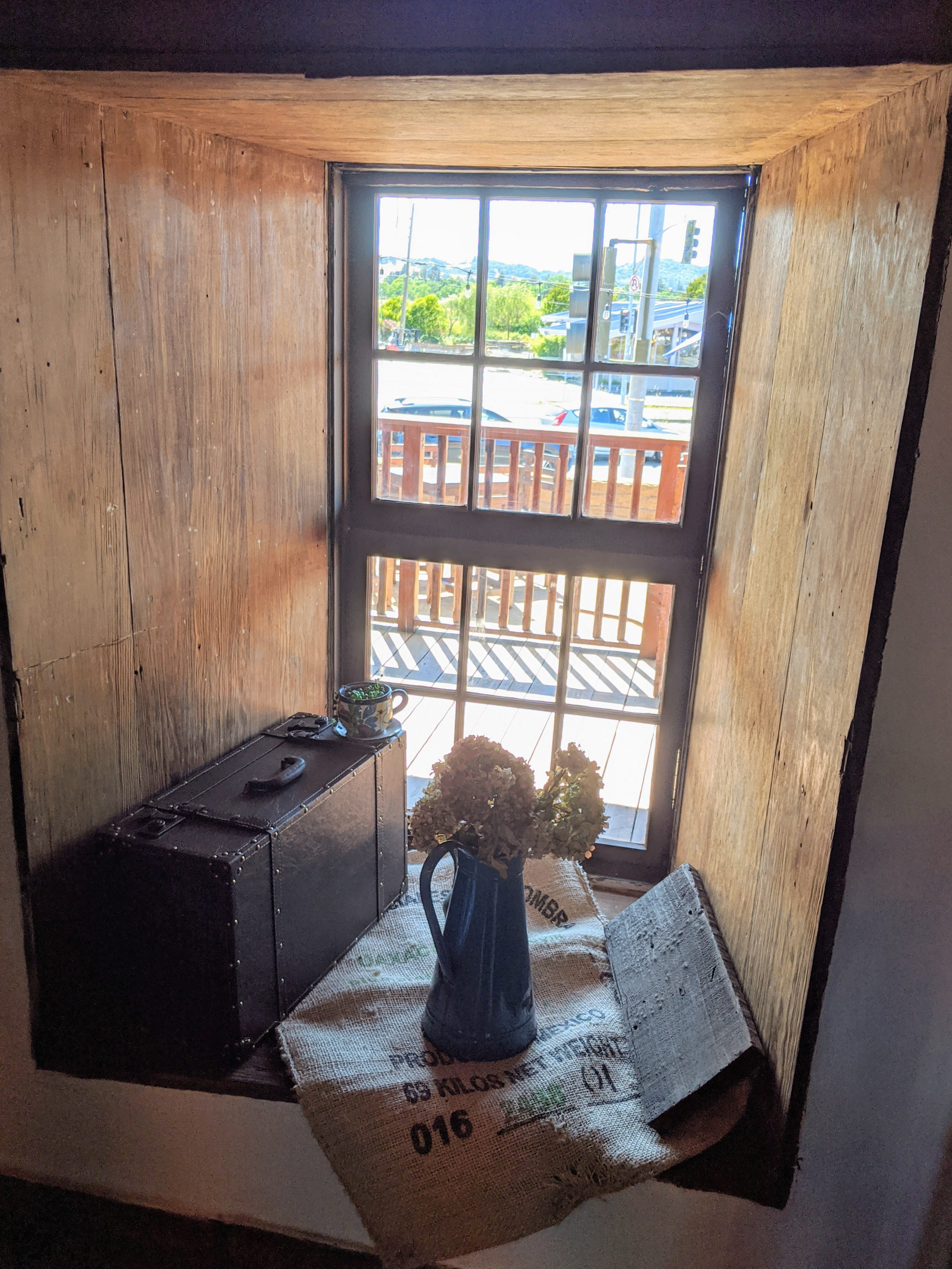
The window openings reveal how thick the adobe walls are.

Constructed in 1845 in a rectangular form primarily out of adobe brick, the building has walls that are three feet thick at the foundation, tapering to two feet thick above the attic. The structure of the building also incorporates wooden beams and exposed wooden rafters. The overhanging porch is supported by four heavy wooden posts. These posts, which are chamfered, measure 8" X 8", and three are original old growth redwood. The porch rafters are finished with decorative details. The building displays many vernacular characteristics of traditional adobe construction common during the Spanish and Mexican periods of California history.

Shortly after the house was built, an adobe brick shed was added to the northeast corner of the building.

== History ==
The building was the home of the family of Cayetano Juárez, his wife Maria de Jesus Higuerra and their descendants. The couple raised 11 children in the home. Considered community leaders, Juárez and his wife were well known for hosting rodeos and fiestas.

After both died, their daughter Domilita Juárez Metcalf lived in the house and operated portions of the rancho as a farm until the 1920s.

In the 1920s, the building was converted into a restaurant, and a series of modifications and minor additions began. About 1935, a stone and brick fireplace was added to the south side of the building. Around 1950, various additions made of shiplap planks allowed for expanded kitchen facilities. A restaurant and bar called the Old Adobe Hut operated in the building from 1951 until the late 1970s. During the 1970s, a fire caused moderate damage to the southern part of the building. During repairs, some ceiling joists were replaced and some timbers supporting the roof were reinforced.

In 2002, the building was purchased by Tito Fuentes Jr., the son of former San Francisco Giants baseball player Tito Fuentes. The Fuentes family operated a Caribbean/Mexican restaurant in the building for some time. An Indian/Nepali restaurant called Taste of the Himalayas occupied the site until and somewhat after it was sold in 2014.

The South Napa Earthquake of August, 2014 caused some cracking of plastered interior walls and the chimney that had been added in the 1950s. The adobe shed which had been built shortly after the building's construction also separated slightly from the main structure.

== Major renovation ==
In 2014, Napa real estate investor George Altamura purchased the house, pledging to restore it to its 1848 appearance. Altamura had also bought and renovated the historic Uptown Theater in Napa. His grandson Justin Altamura gained ownership of the house and completed that renovation in early March, 2019. Justin Altamura made a considerable effort to study the preservation and restoration of historic adobe buildings, and decided to use traditional materials, techniques and accessories wherever possible. Over 300 large adobe bricks were used in the renovation "made by hand with clay, horse manure, and hay". He hired a team of expert Mexican masons to repair and replace the traditional mud mortar used between the original adobe bricks.

Paint was stripped from original wood beams, door headers, floors and window frames. Interior walls were finished with plaster made out of sand, mud and pine needles. The exterior was whitewashed with a traditional product blended from lime, salt and water.

Juliana Inman, a member of the Napa County Landmarks Board and an architect, praised the renovation, stating that the project gave the building "some cachet and some importance", observing that over decades "it’s been abused and converted to other uses and terrible additions made to it", concluding that "it’s just remarkable that it’s still here after all of that." Describing Justin Altamura, Inman stated that "He’s listened very carefully. He’s so appreciative of the history of the building and the site. It’s like a gift to the community for him to be working on it."

== Current use ==
La Cheve, a Mexican restaurant, bakery and brewery, opened in the building in 2020. The opening was delayed for two months due to the COVID-19 pandemic in the United States.

== Gallery ==
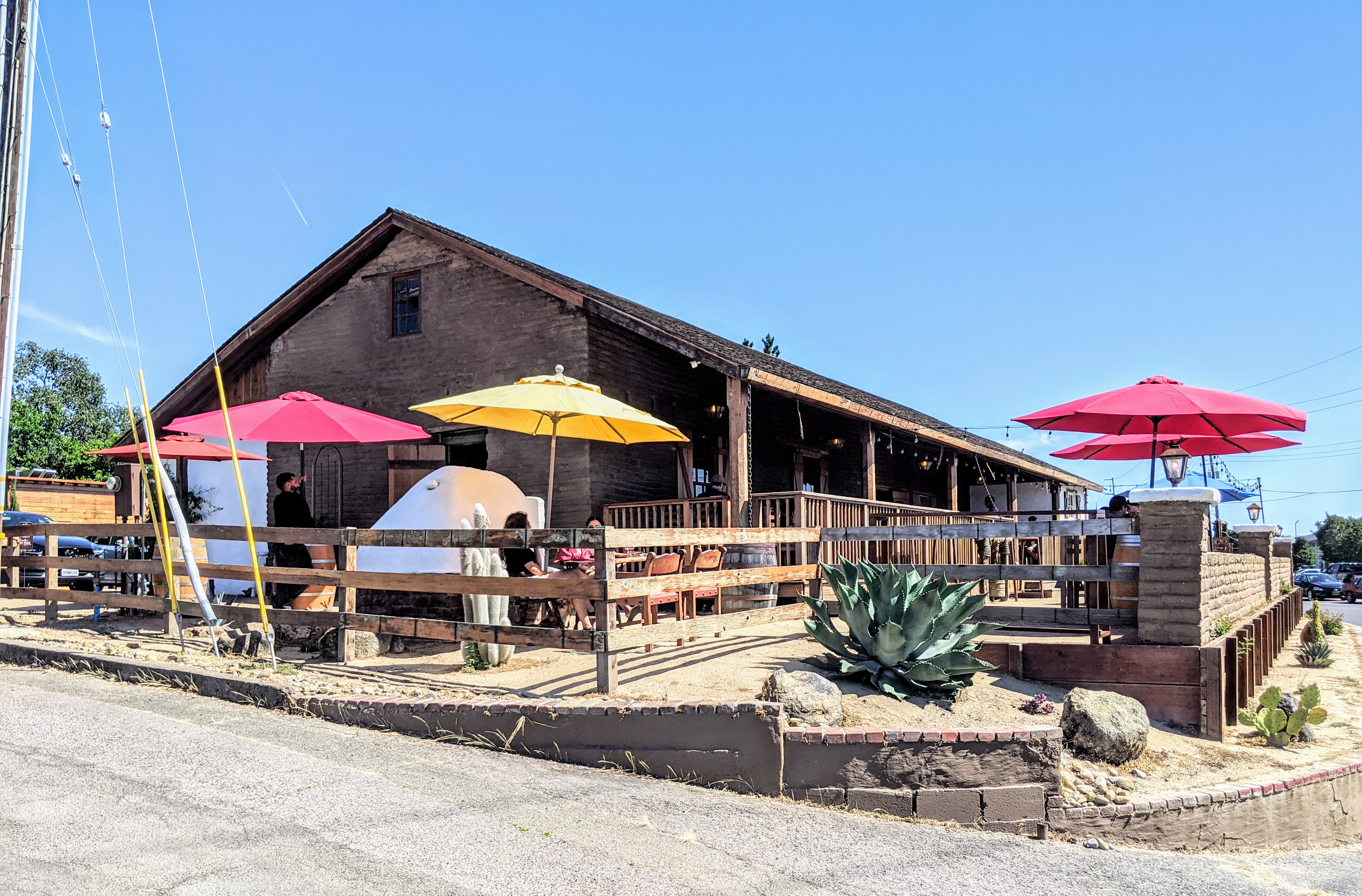
Outdoor service at La Cheve Mexican restaurant during the COVID-19 pandemic

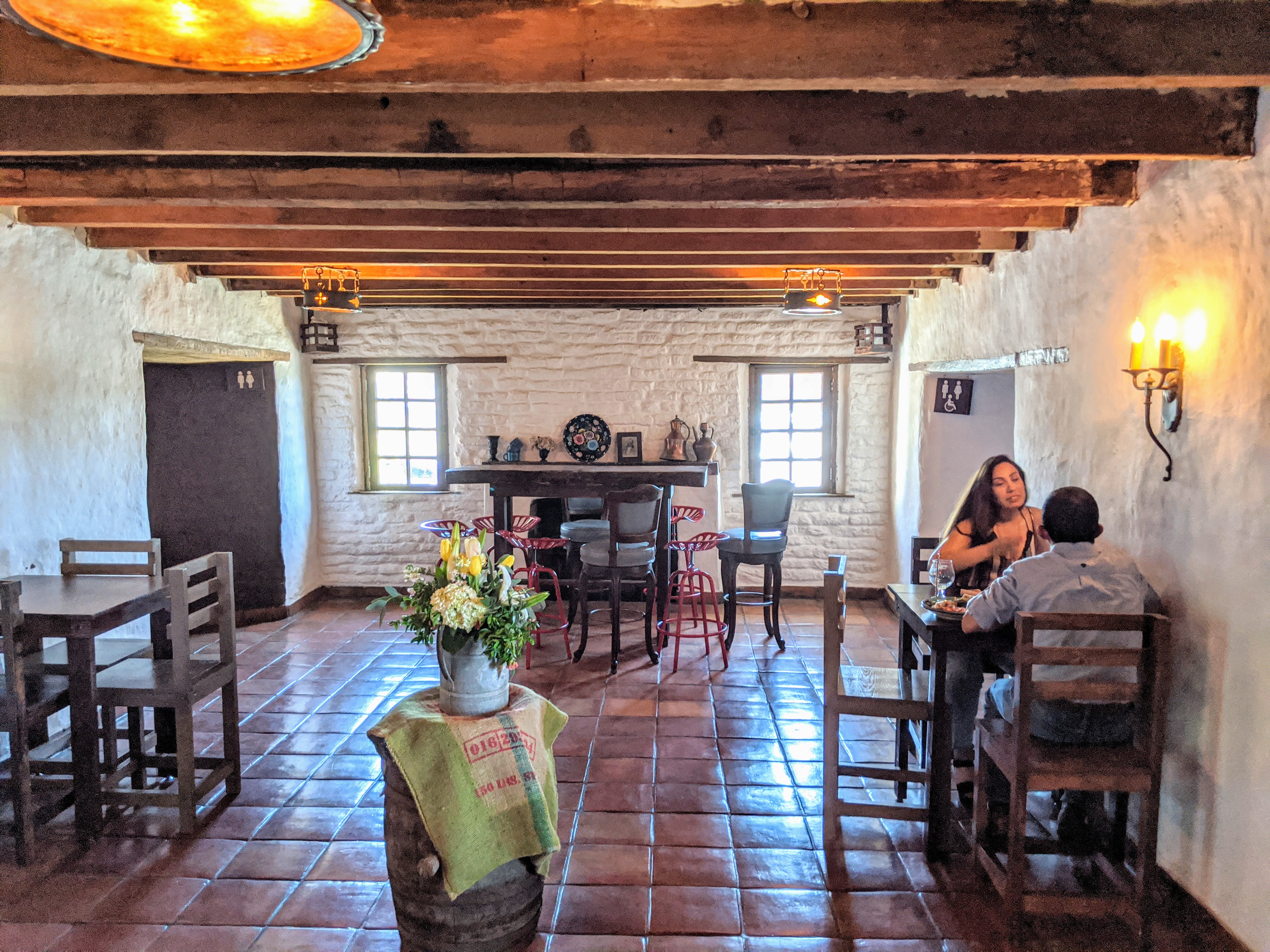
Original wooden beams now exposed again

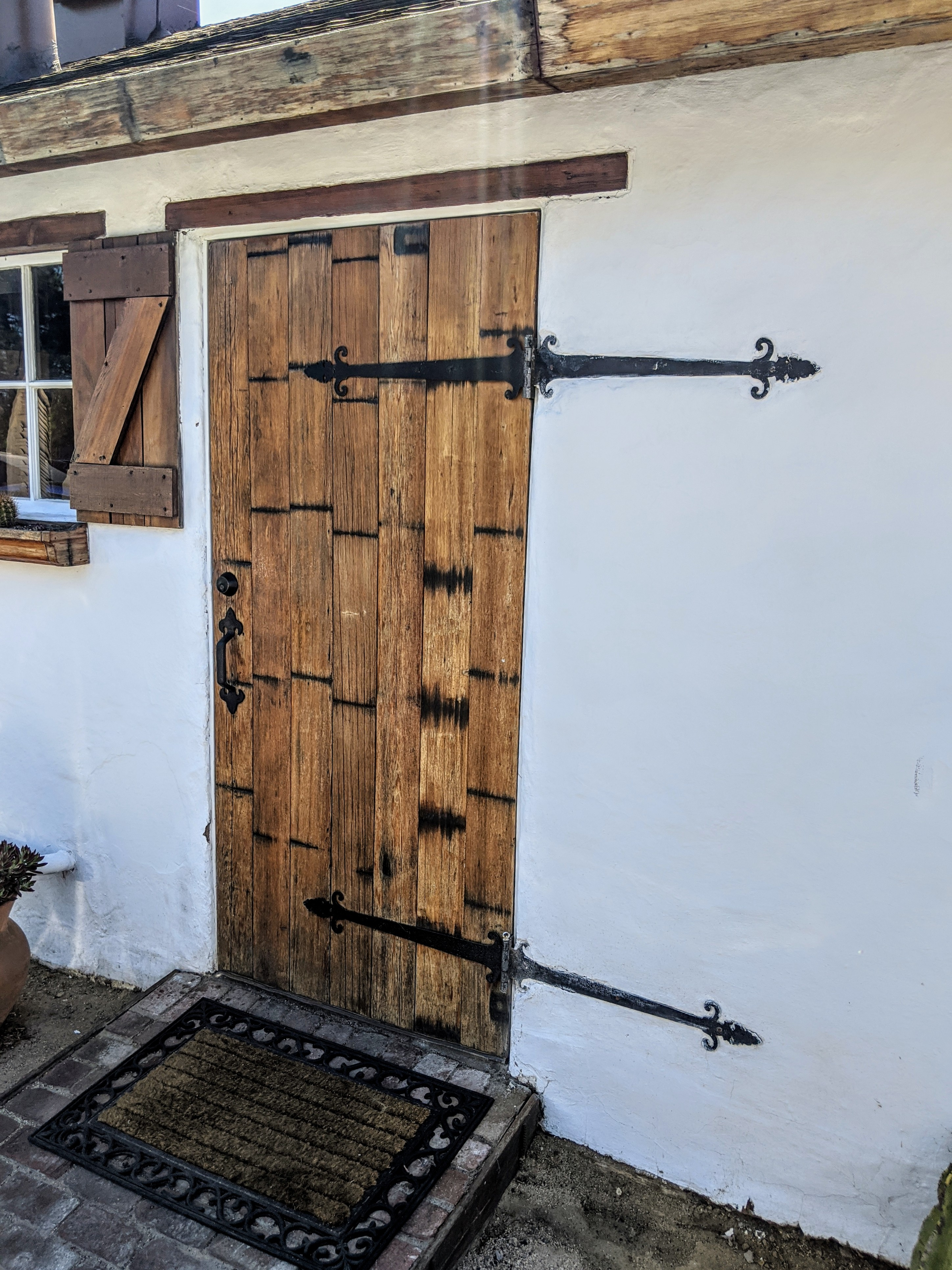
Entrance door restored to its original appearance
