= Henry William Heisch =

United States Marine Corps Medal of Honor recipient

- Born: June 10, 1872; Latendorf, Schleswig-Holstein, Germany
- Died: July 10, 1941 (aged 69); Napa County, California, United States
- Burial place: Tulocay Cemetery Napa, California
- Military career
- Allegiance: United States of America
- Branch: United States Marine Corps
- Service years: 1898–1903
- Rank: Private
- Conflicts: Boxer Rebellion
- Awards: Medal of Honor

Henry W. Heisch (June 10, 1872 – 1941) was a Private serving in the United States Marine Corps during the Boxer Rebellion who received the Medal of Honor for bravery.

== Biography ==
Heisch was born June 10, 1872, in Latendorf, Germany, and after entering the Marine Corps, he was sent as a private to China to fight in the Boxer Rebellion.

While fighting the enemy in Tientsin, China on June 20, 1900, he and a few other soldiers crossed the river in a small boat while under heavy fire and they assisted in destroying buildings occupied by the enemy. For this action, he received the Medal of Honor from President Theodore Roosevelt on March 22, 1902.

He died in 1941 in Napa County, California and is buried in Napa, California at Tulocay Cemetery.

== Medal of Honor citation ==
Rank and organization: Private, U.S. Marine Corps. Born: 10 June 1872, Latendorf, Germany. Accredited to: California. G.O. No.: 84, 22 March 1902.

Citation:

In action against the enemy at Tientsin, China, 20 June 1900. Crossing the river in a small boat while under heavy fire, Heisch assisted in destroying buildings occupied by the enemy.

== See also ==
- List of Medal of Honor recipients
- List of Medal of Honor recipients for the Boxer Rebellion
