= Cayetano Juárez =

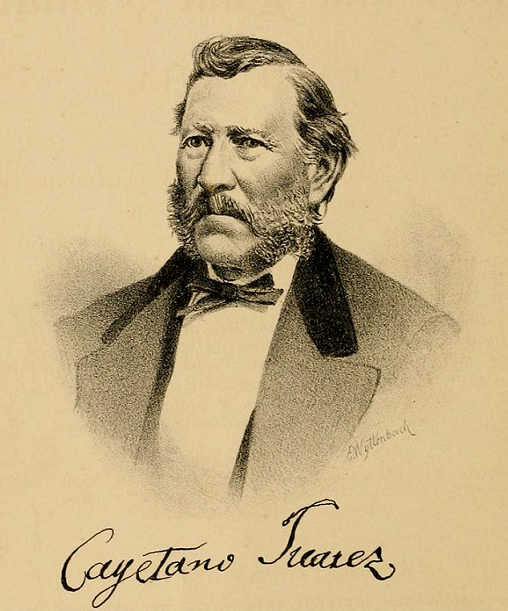
- Born: 1809; Monterey, California
- Died: 1883 (aged 73–74); Napa, California
- Occupation(s): Ranchero, soldier
- Spouse: Luisa Peralta

Don Cayetano Juárez (1809 – 1883) was a Californio ranchero and soldier, who played a prominent role in the 19th century North Bay, particularly in Napa County. The home he built, the Cayetano Juárez Adobe, is the oldest building in the city of Napa.

== Early life ==
Juárez was born a Spanish subject at the Presidio of Monterey, California, on February 24, 1809. Mexico, including California, became independent from Spain in 1821.

Juárez enlisted in the Mexican Army on April 1, 1827, at age 18, and on August 14 of that year, he was dispatched to assist with control of the Indians in the Sonoma and Napa areas, the very northern frontier of Mexican control of California.

On February 19, 1829, Indians attacked Mission San Rafael Arcángel in what is now Marin County, California, forcing the priest to go into hiding in the marshes along San Francisco Bay. Juárez led a squad of soldiers who pursued the Indians to a ranchería near present-day Sebastopol, California. There, he suffered a minor arrow wound. His multi-layered buckskin coat absorbed much of the impact of the arrowhead and protected him from a more serious injury. He was discharged from the Mexican Army at the Presidio of San Francisco on February 19, 1836.

== Ranchero ==
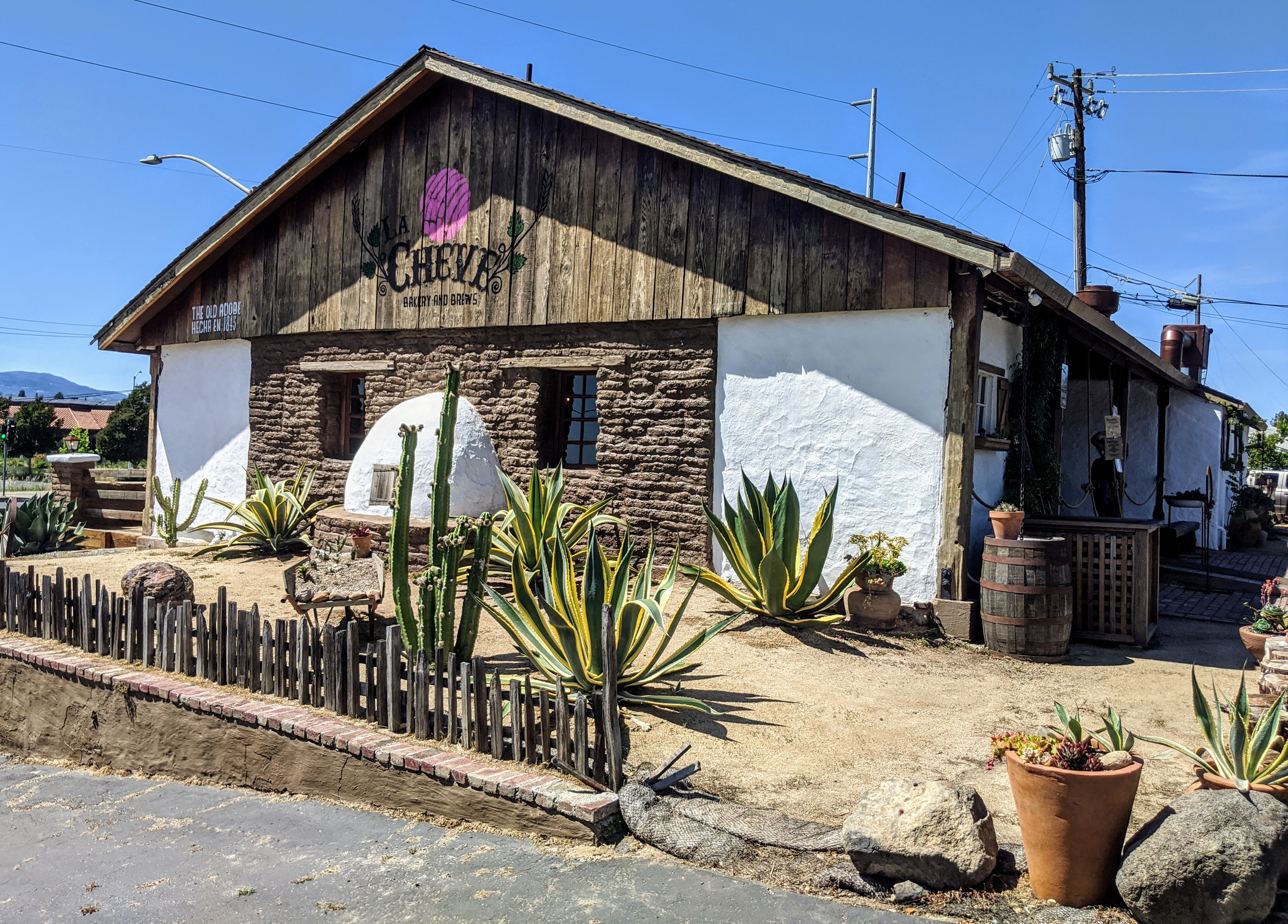
The Cayetano Juárez Adobe in Napa.

He spent the winter of 1837-1838 establishing herds of horses and cattle in the Napa Valley while living for safety with his family close to Mission San Francisco Solano in Sonoma, California. In his years of military service and public life in Sonoma, he established a close relationship with General Mariano Vallejo, the most powerful man of that community.

In December, 1837, he assisted Vallejo by helping to quell a mutiny of 24 Indian soldiers serving in the Mexican Army. He chased the deserters and helped convince them to end their rebellion.

Juárez moved his family to the Napa Valley in 1840, building a small adobe home. On October 6, 1840, Mariano Vallejo gave him a Mexican land grant, Rancho Tulucay, consisting of 8,865 acres (35.88 km^{2}) east of the Napa River. In 1844, he was elected alcalde of the district of Sonoma.

In 1845, he built a larger adobe home that still stands and is the oldest building in the city of Napa. That building, fully restored and functioning as a restaurant in 2020, was listed on the National Register of Historic Places in 2015. Juárez and his wife were well known for hosting rodeos and fiestas.

Also in 1845, Governor Pío Pico awarded Juárez a second land grant, called Rancho Yokaya, consisting of 35,541 acres (143.83 km^{2}) in what is now Mendocino County, California. The present day city of Ukiah, California, is located there.

== Bear Flag Revolt ==
During the brief Bear Flag Revolt against Mexican rule over California, which began in Sonoma on June 14, 1846, he acted as an intermediary between local Mexican government officials and the mostly American rebels. Mariano Vallejo had been taken hostage by the rebels and was eventually held at Sutter's Fort in Sacramento. Juárez tried to obtain his release and took steps to ensure Vallejo's safety. When two American prisoners of the Mexican forces were threatened with execution, Juárez traveled to Rancho Cotate and intervened to prevent the killings. By July, the United States government was in control, and Mexican rule in California came to a swift end. In August, 1848, U.S. Colonel John C. Frémont and 150 members of his California Battalion, rode through Rancho Tulucay, foraging as they traveled. Some of Frémont's men stole horses, saddles and cattle belonging to Juárez. He appealed directly to Frémont, and his saddles were returned.

== Later years ==
In 1859, Juárez donated 48 acres (0.19 km^{2}) of land to the City of Napa to establish the Tulocay Cemetery. On August 2, 1882, Juarez sold 209 acres (0.85 km^{2}) of his Rancho Tulucay land to the state of California for $11,506.00 for the purpose of constructing an insane asylum. Napa State Hospital is now located on that site. Juarez died on December 16, 1883, and is buried alongside his wife at Tulocay Cemetery.

== Personal life ==
Juárez married Maria de Jesus Higuerra (born San Francisco, December 4, 1815) on February 14, 1835. They had 11 children, seven of whom lived to adulthood.

== Legacy ==
A document published by the National Trust for Historic Preservation called Juárez "one of California's most influential Rancho Era pioneers", going on to conclude, "During the 1830s Cayetano waged many successful campaigns out of the Presidio of San Francisco and after his honorable discharge in 1836, Cayetano Juarez successfully transitioned from a loyal Mexican citizen and a soldier in the Mexican Army under General Vallejo and Lieutenant Martinez to a valuable mediator between the Americans, Spaniards and Indians."

Juárez's descendants raised cattle in the Napa Valley for generations until well into the 21st century.
