= Rancho Tulucay =

Mexican land grant in California

Coordinates: 38.300°N 122.270°W

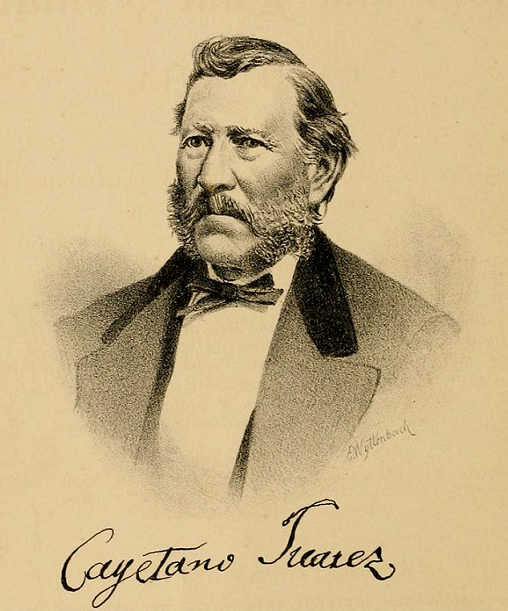
Rancho Tulucay was granted to Californio ranchero Cayetano Juárez in 1841

Rancho Tulucay was a 8,866-acre (35.88 km^{2}) Mexican land grant in present day Napa County, California given in 1841 by Governor pro tem Manuel Jimeno to Cayetano Juarez. The Tulucay name originates with the names Tulkays and Ulucas that were applied to the inhabitants of Tuluka, a Patwin village in the area. The grant was on the east side of the Napa River, between Soscol Creek on the south, and Sarco Creek on the north.

== History ==
Cayetano Juarez (1809 - 1883) was a soldier at Presidio of San Francisco until 1836. Juarez married Maria de Jesus Higuerra (1815 - 1890), daughter of Francisco Higuerra, in 1835. In 1836 Juarez was made mayordomo at Sonoma. Under the leadership of General Mariano Vallejo, Juarez was assigned an active role in managing the land and associated native population in the Napa/Sonoma County region. For his decade of service to the Mexican government, Juarez was granted the two square league Rancho Tulocay. In 1840 (before the grant deed was finalized) Cayetano Juarez moved his family from Sonoma to Napa Valley. During the year 1840 he built his first adobe house, which is still standing. In 1844 he was elected alcalde of Sonoma. In 1845 he built a second and larger adobe and was granted Rancho Yokaya in Mendocino County.

With the cession of California to the United States following the Mexican-American War, the 1848 Treaty of Guadalupe Hidalgo provided that the land grants would be honored. As required by the Land Act of 1851, a claim for Rancho Tulucay was filed with the Public Land Commission in 1852, and the grant was patented to Cayetano Juarez in 1861.

Although often away, Juarez resided on the Rancho lands until his death in 1883. Juarez was buried in the Tulocay Cemetery, the original lands of which he donated for use as a cemetery in 1853.

== Historic sites of the Rancho ==
- The Cayetano Juarez Adobe. The 1840 Juarez adobe remains standing today and is used as a restaurant.
- Tulocay Cemetery. Cayetano Juarez donated approximately 48 acres (0.2 km^{2}) of land to the City of Napa for Tulocay (sic) Cemetery in 1859.
- Napa State Asylum for the Insane. In 1872, Juarez sold 192 acres (0.8 km^{2}) of his Rancho Tulucay land to the State of California for the purpose of constructing a new State hospital that could accommodate the overcrowded facilities at the Stockton Asylum.

== See also ==
- Ranchos of California
- List of Ranchos of California
