= Tulocay Cemetery =

Cemetery in Napa, California

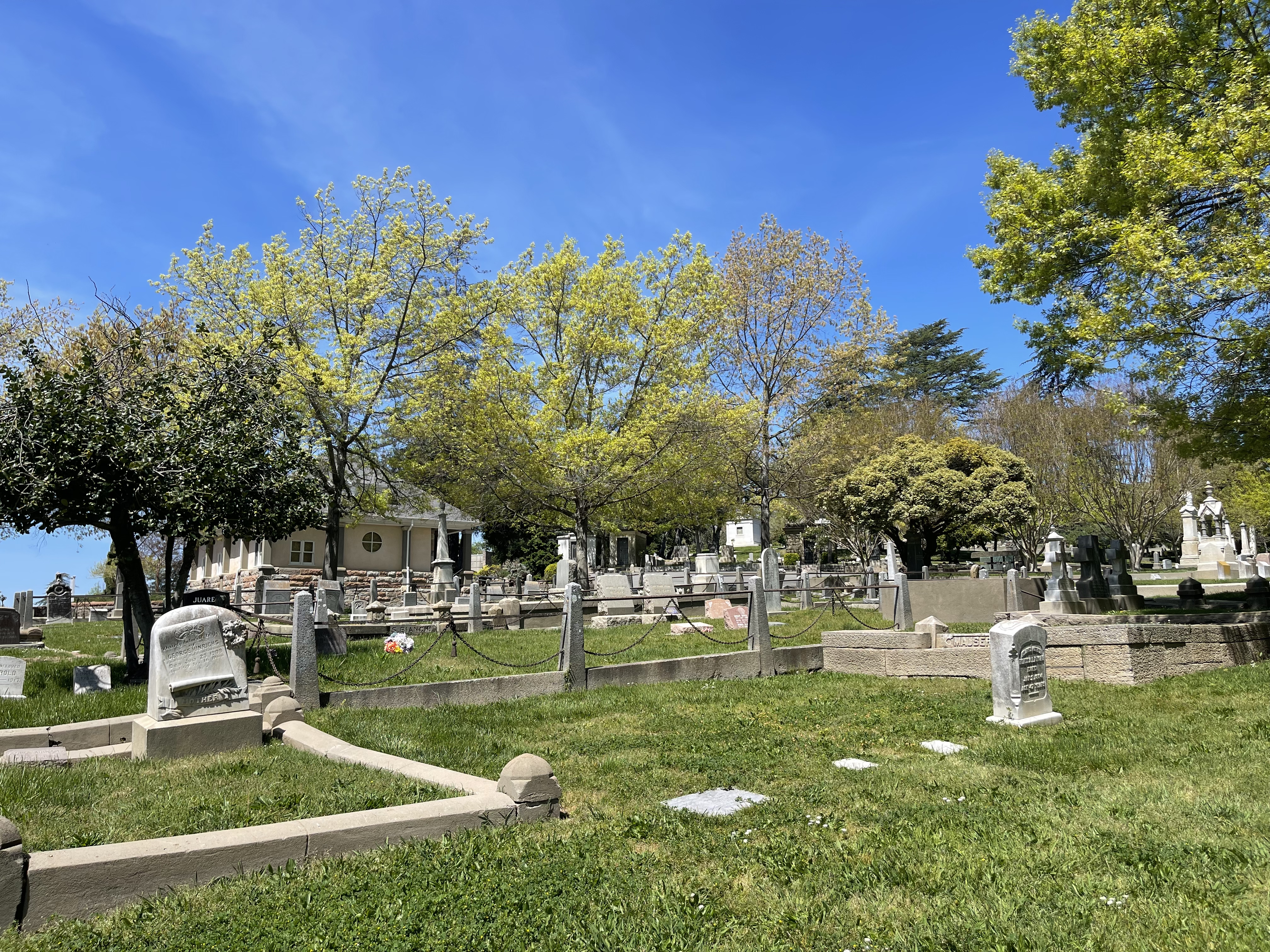
- Interactive map of Tulocay Cemetery

Details
- Established: 1859
- Location: Napa, California, U.S.
- Country: United States
- Coordinates: 38.297821°N 122.271808°W
- Type: Private, Non-Profit, Non-Sectarian
- Website: www.tulocaycemetery.org
- Find a Grave: Tulocay Cemetery

Tulocay Cemetery is a cemetery located in Napa, California originally established in 1859 following Governor pro tem Manuel Jimeno to Cayetano Juárez's 1853 donation of approximately 48 acres (0.2 km^{2}) of land to the people of Napa.

== History ==
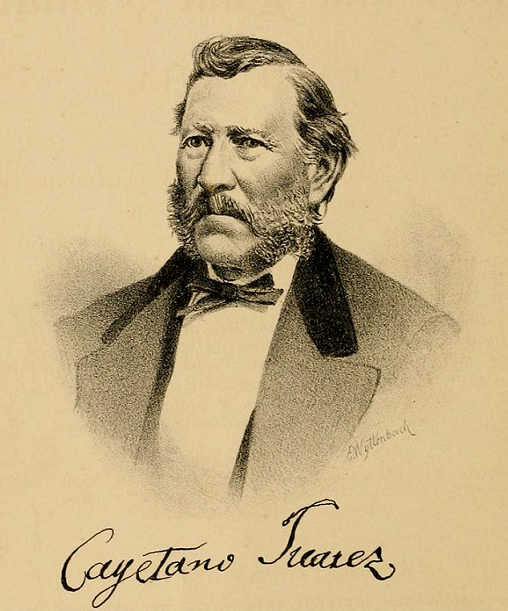
Tulocay Cemetery was founded by Californio rancher Cayetano Juárez, who donated the land for the cemetery to the city.

The cemetery is located on land that was originally part of Rancho Tulucay, a Mexican land grant.

== Notable interments ==
Several notable people are interred or entombed in the Tulocay cemetery.

- Lilburn Boggs, former Governor of Missouri, former member of California State Assembly
- James Clyman, California pioneer
- Nathan Coombs, California pioneer, founder of the city of Napa, California
- Frank Coombs, Former United States Representative
- George Washington Gift, U. S. Navy officer, writer, banker, civil engineer, politician, Confederate Navy officer, businessman, and newspaper editor
- Henry William Heisch, Medal of Honor recipient
- John Patchett, founder of first commercial vineyard and winery in Napa County
- Mary Ellen Pleasant, 19th-century African American entrepreneur and abolitionist
