= Napa, California =

City in California, United States

- City
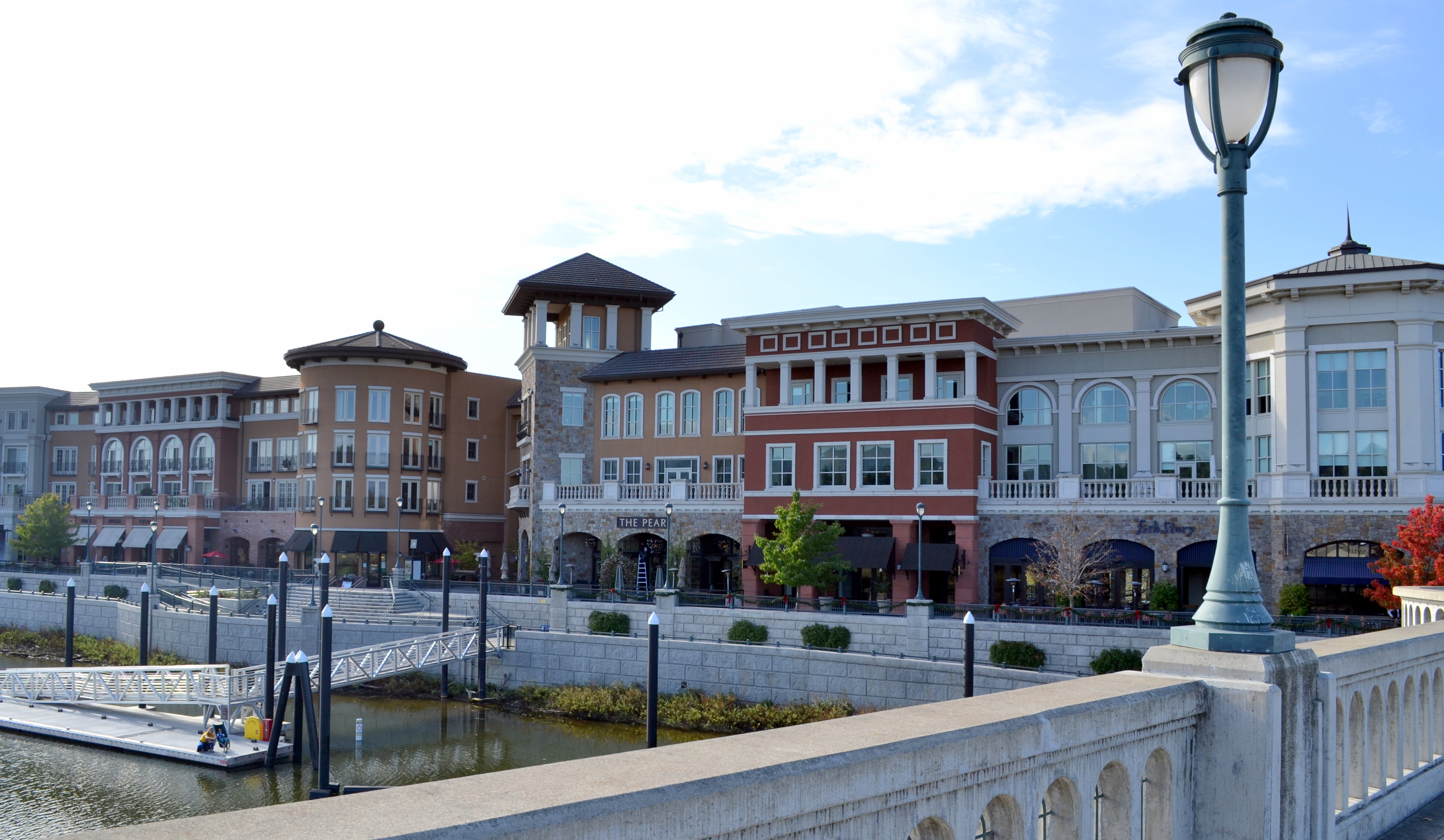
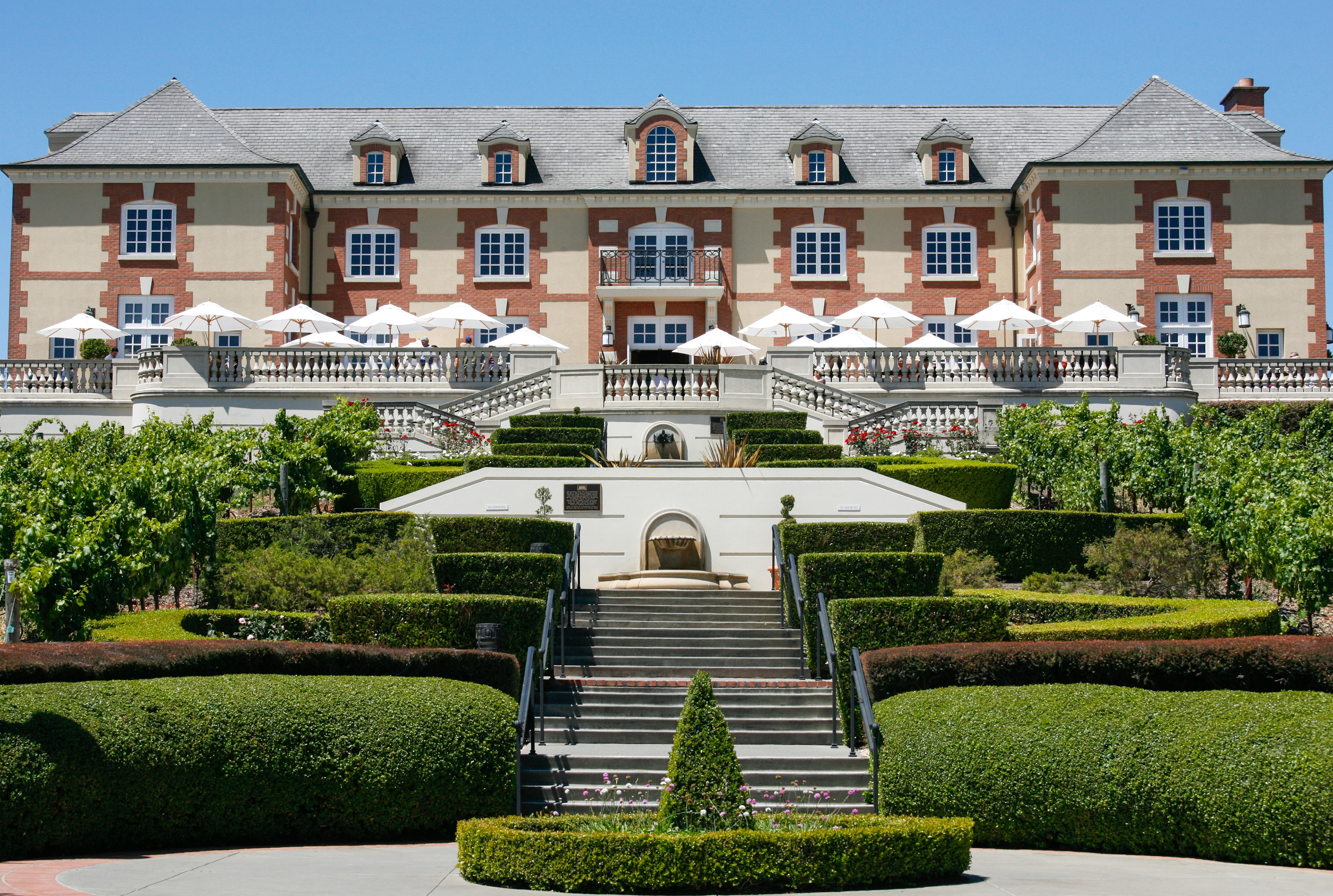
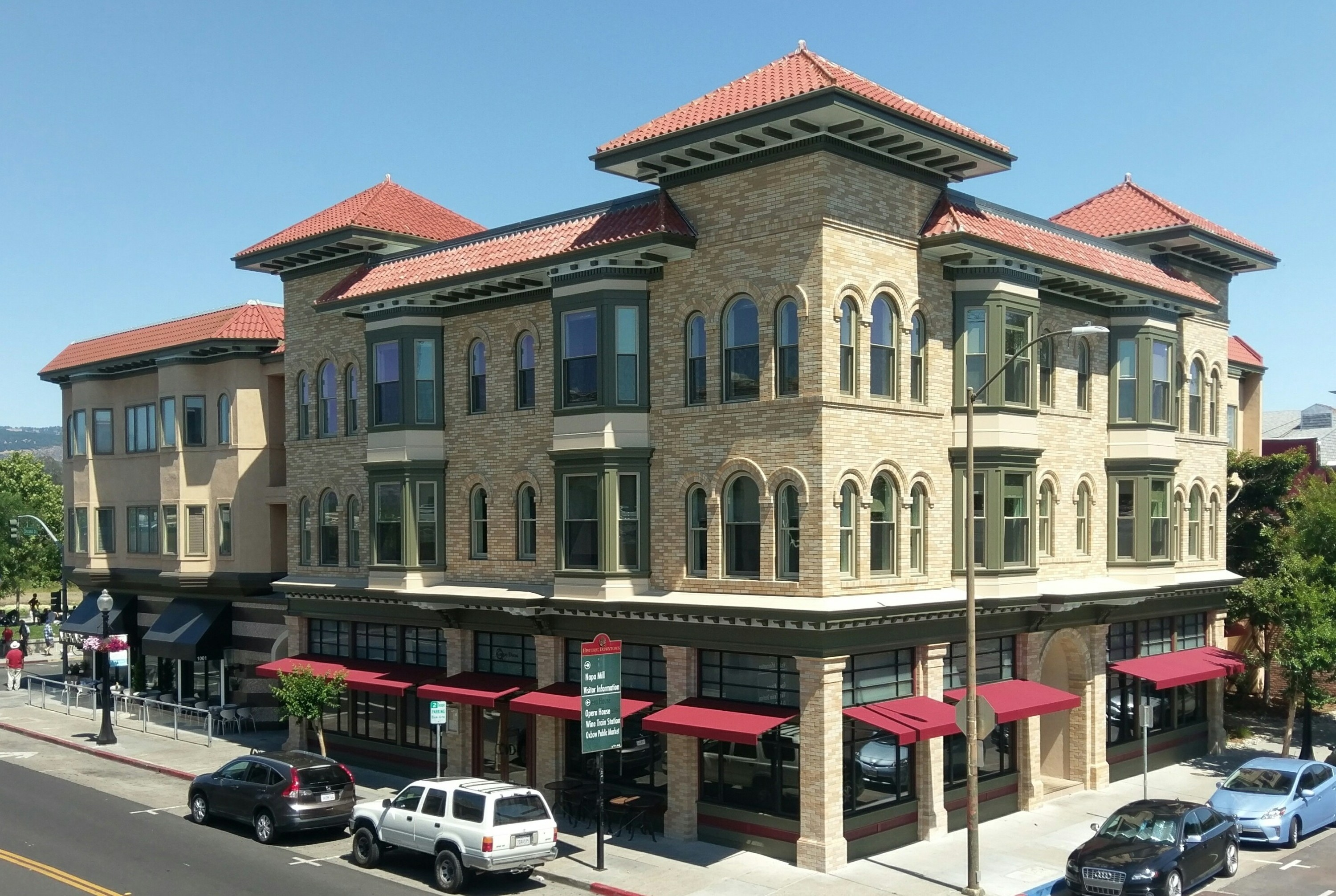
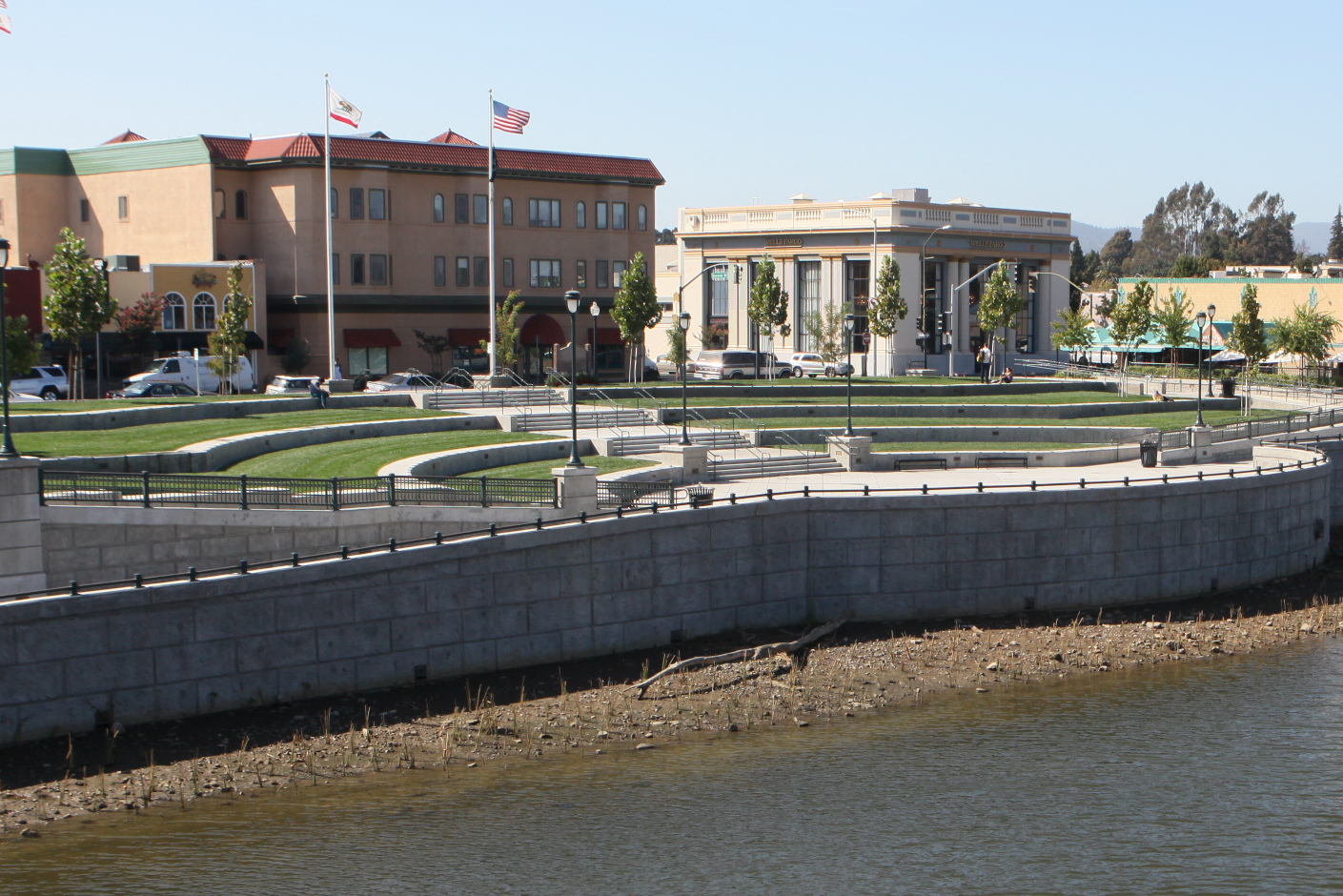
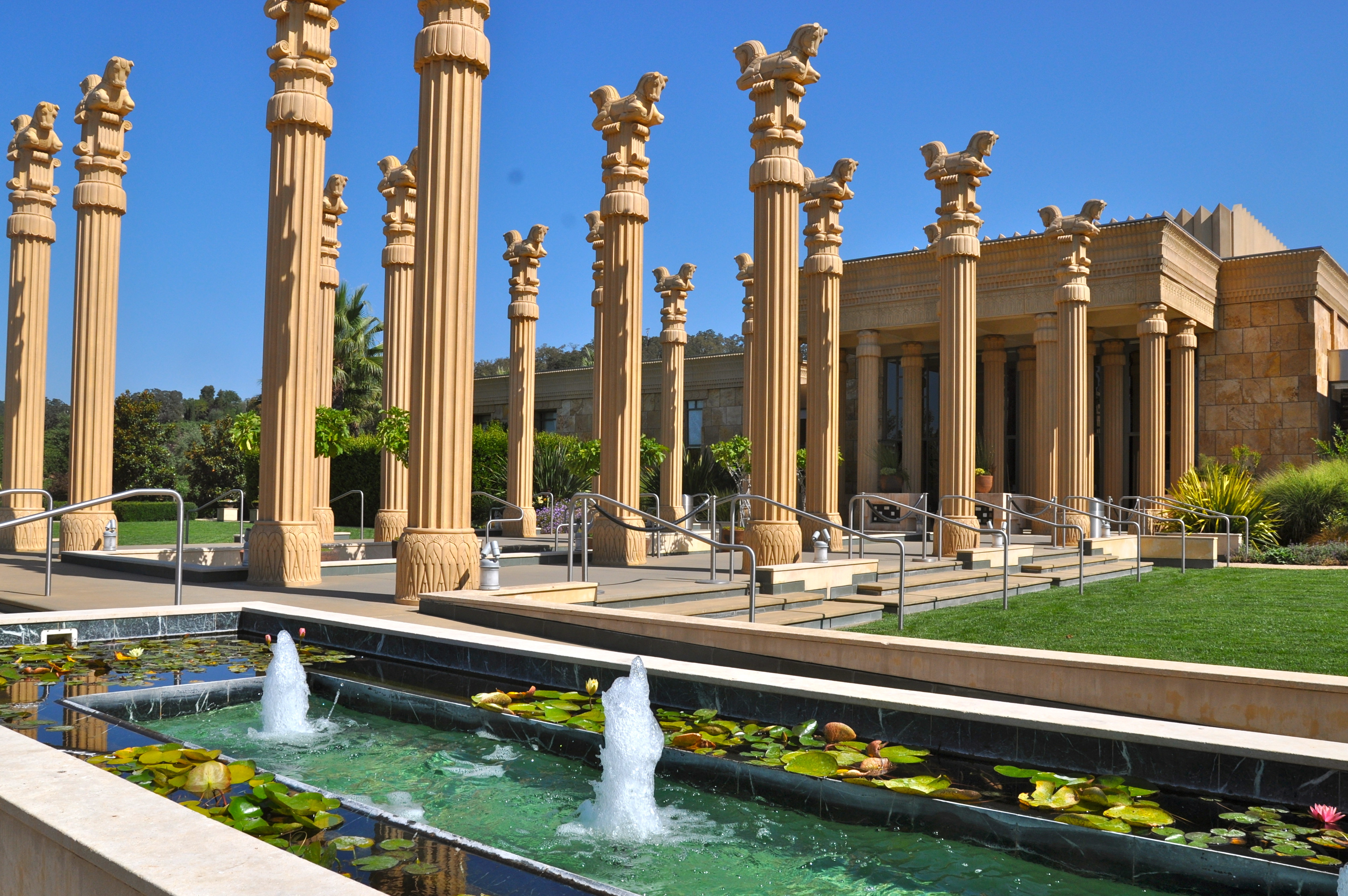
- Clockwise: Napa Waterfront; Alexandria Hotel; Darioush Winery; Downtown Napa; Domaine Carneros
- Interactive map of Napa, California
- Coordinates: 38°18′17″N 122°17′56″W
- Country: United States
- State: California
- County: Napa
- Region: Northern California
- Incorporated: March 23, 1872

Government
  - Type: Mayor and Council Government
  - Mayor: Scott Sedgley (D)

Area
  - City: 18.35 sq mi (47.53 km^{2})
  - Land: 18.05 sq mi (46.74 km^{2})
  - Water: 0.31 sq mi (0.79 km^{2}) 1.67%
- Elevation: 20 ft (6.1 m)

Population (2020)
  - City: 79,246
  - Estimate (2025): 76,562
  - Density: 4,391/sq mi (1,695.4/km^{2})
  - Metro (2024): 132,727
- Time zone: UTC-8 (Pacific (PST))
  - Summer (DST): UTC-7 (PDT)
- ZIP Codes: 94558, 94559, 94581
- Area code: 707
- FIPS code: 06-50258
- GNIS feature IDs: 277561, 2411209
- Website: www.cityofnapa.org

Napa (/ˈnæpə/; NAP-ə) is the largest city in and the county seat of Napa County and a principal city of Wine Country in Northern California, United States. Located in the North Bay region of the Bay Area, the city had a population of 76,921 as of July 2024. Napa is a major tourist destination in California, known for its wineries, restaurants, and arts culture.

== History ==
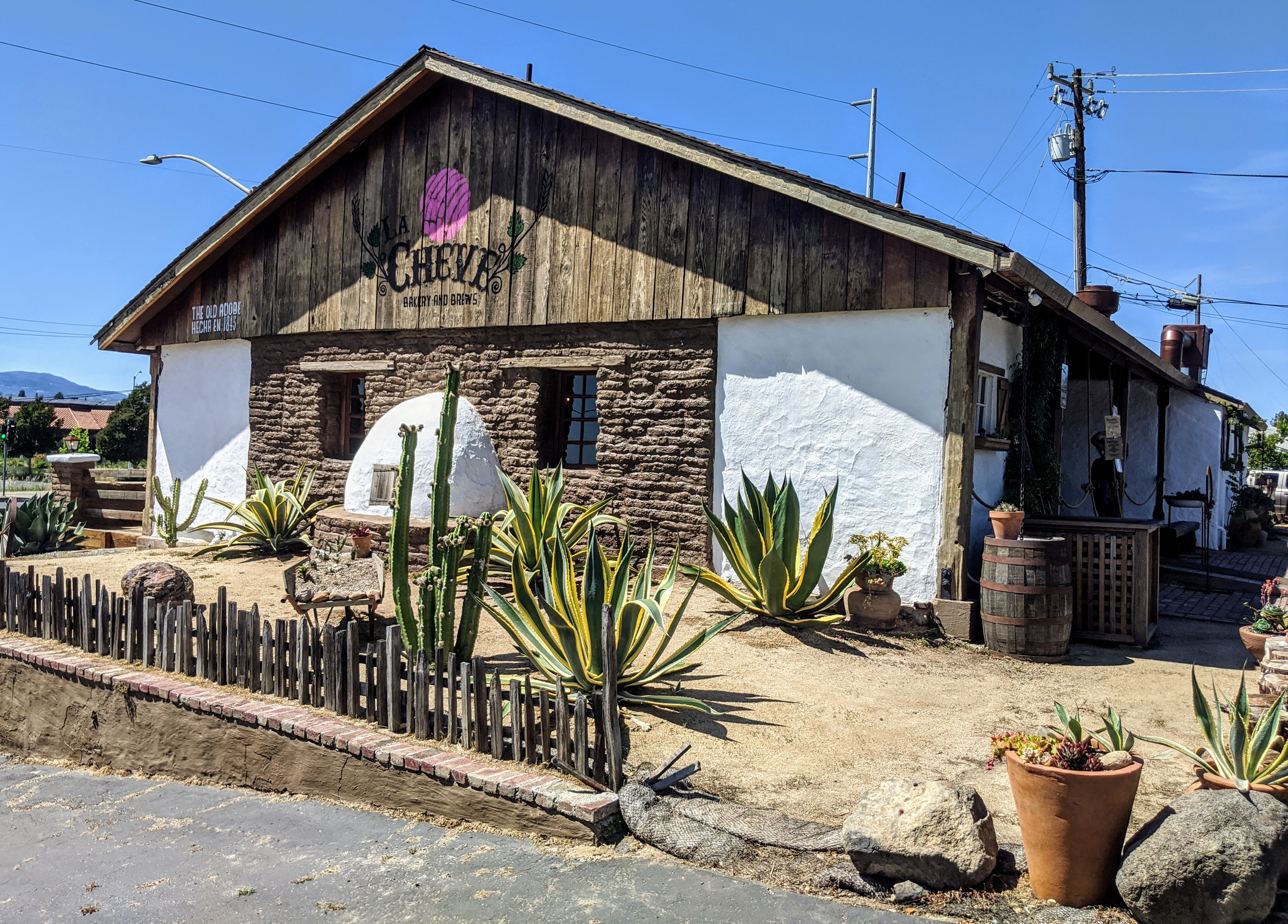
The Cayetano Juárez Adobe, built in 1845 by Californio ranchero Cayetano Juárez, is the oldest building in Napa.

The origin of the word "Napa" is disputed.

The word "napa" is of Native American derivation and has been variously translated as "grizzly bear", "house", "motherland" or "fish". Of the many explanations of the name's origin, the most plausible seems to be that it is derived from the Patwin word napo, meaning "house".

Further adding confusion, Napa was originally spelled with two Ps: Nappa. There are maps and deeds dating back to the mid-1850s bearing this spelling. Shortly thereafter, the present spelling was adopted; the reasons for this are unclear.

=== Mexican era ===
At the time of the first recorded exploration into Napa Valley in 1823, the majority of the inhabitants consisted of Native Americans. Padre José Altimira, founder of Mission San Francisco Solano in Sonoma, led the expedition. Spanish priests converted some natives; the rest were attacked and dispersed by Mexican soldiers.

The first American settlers began arriving in the area in the 1830s.

=== Post-Conquest era ===
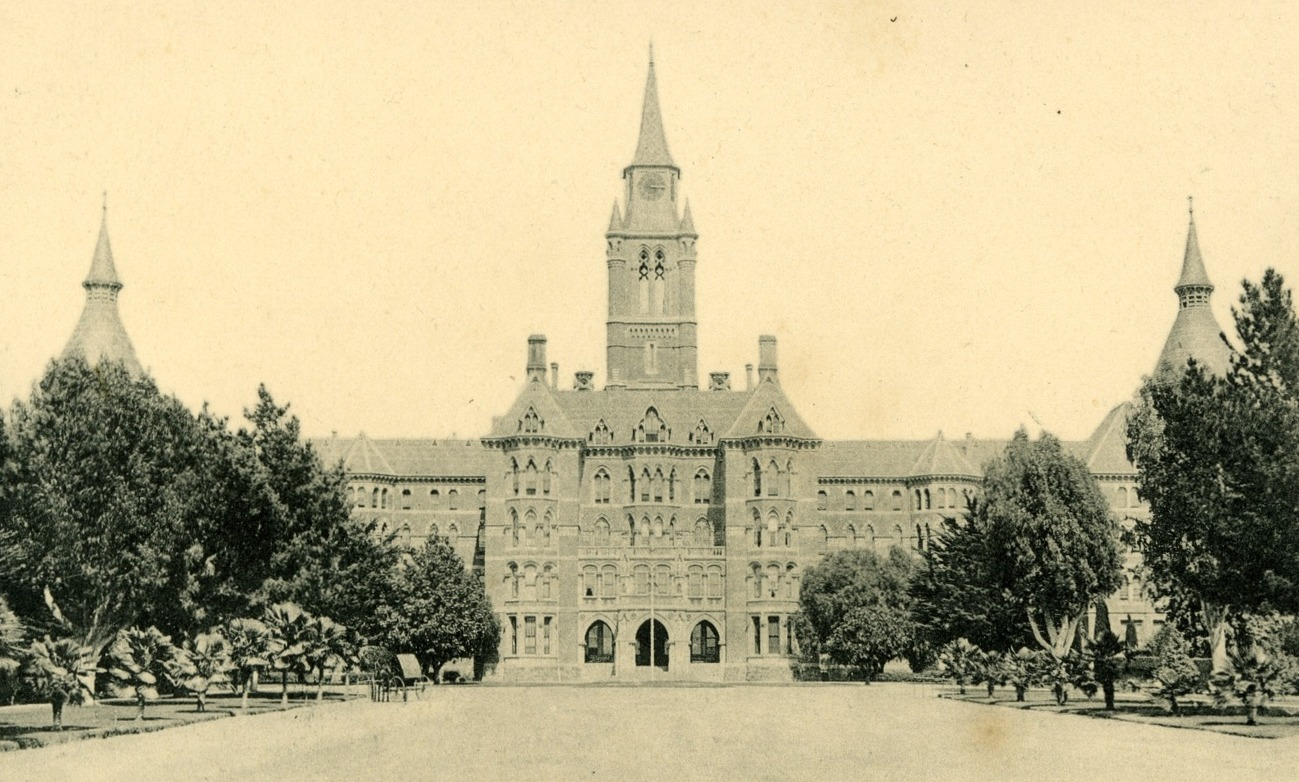
Napa State Hospital opened in 1875.

Prior to the Conquest of California by the U.S., Napa Valley was in California's District of Sonoma. At the time, its boundaries also included Lake County to the north. By this time, the indigenous people were either working as field laborers or living in small bands in the hills surrounding the valley. Tensions between the white settlers and Native Americans broke into war in 1850, resulting in soldiers hunting down and massacring all the natives they could find, driving the remainder north toward Clear Lake. By 1870, the Native American population consisted of only a few laborers and servants working for the white settlers.

The City of Napa was founded by Nathan Coombs in 1847. General Mariano Guadalupe Vallejo had paid to survey for a township downriver at Soscol Landing, where riverboats could turn around prior to Napa's founding. Instead, the Napa town site was surveyed on property Coombs had received from Nicolas Higuera, original holder of the Rancho Entre Napa, a Mexican land grant. The first record of a ship navigating the river was the Susana in 1842, though by 1850 the Dolphin became the first passenger steamship to navigate the Napa River in order to open another path of commerce.

In the mid-1850s, Napa's Main Street rivaled that of many larger cities, with as many as 100 saddle horses tied to the fences on an average afternoon. John Patchett opened the first commercial winery in the county in 1859. The Napa Valley Register, founded by J.I. Horrell and L. Hoxie Strong, made its debut on August 10, 1863, with weekly publications until becoming a daily newspaper in 1872.

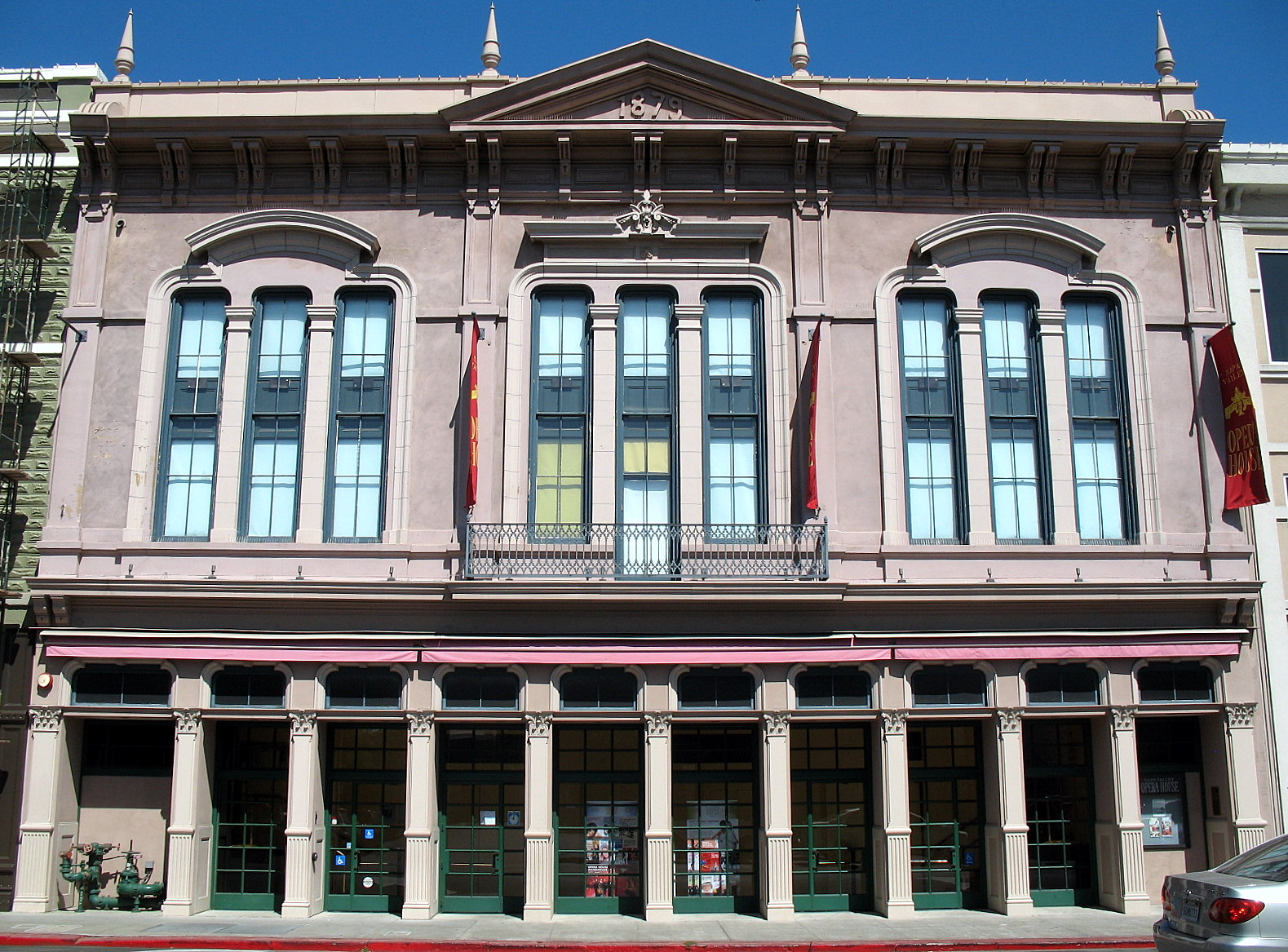
Napa Valley Opera House, built in 1879

The California Gold Rush of the late 1850s expanded Napa City. A tent city was erected along Main Street. Many cattle ranches were maintained, and the lumber industry had greatly expanded. Sawmills in the valley were in operation cutting up timber that was hauled by team to Napa and then shipped out on the river to Benicia and San Francisco.

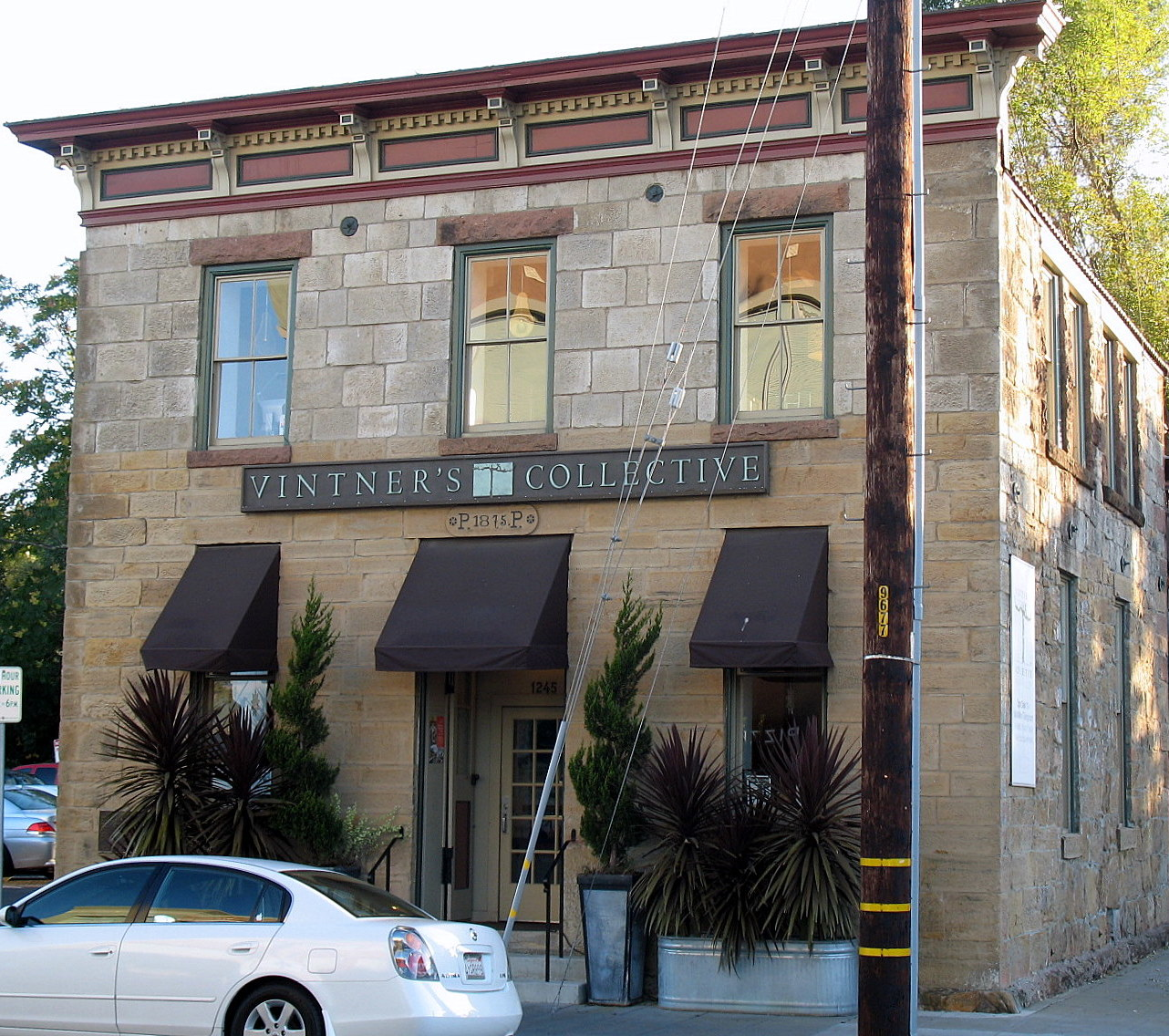
The Sam Kee Laundry, built 1875, is the oldest commercial building in Napa.

In 1858, the great silver rush began in Napa Valley, and miners eagerly flocked to the eastern hills. In the 1860s, mining carried on, in a large scale, with quicksilver mines operating in many areas of Napa County. The most noted mine was the Silverado Mine, near the summit of Mount Saint Helena. At this time, the first wave of rural, foreign laborers from coastal villages of China's Canton province arrived in California and at Napa County mines. A settlement for Chinese laborers in Napa was established in the early 1860s. At its peak from the 1880s to the early 1900s, the Chinese population grew to a population of over 300 people.

In 1869, F. A. Sawyer established Sawyer Tanning Company in Napa and was joined in the business by his father B. F. Sawyer a year later. It went on to become the largest tannery west of the Mississippi River. The world-famous Nappa leather or Napa leather was invented by Emanuel Manasse in Napa in 1875 while working at the Sawyer Tanning Company.

Napa was incorporated on March 23, 1872, and reincorporated in 1874 as the City of Napa.

The Napa State Hospital received its first patients in 1876. The Napa Valley Opera House became popular after its debut on February 13, 1880, with a production of Gilbert and Sullivan's HMS Pinafore, but it later languished and was closed for many years. It was reestablished in the 1980s.

In the following decades, Napa’s social and residential development was influenced by exclusionary housing practices. During the mid-20th century, subdivisions such as Alta Heights, Westwood, and portions of the Linda Vista area utilized racially restrictive covenants that legally prohibited non-white residents from purchasing or occupying homes. Due to these documented patterns of residential segregation, the city is classified as a 'probable' sundown town in the James W. Loewen national database of exclusionary communities and is noted in the list of sundown towns for California.

=== Modern era ===
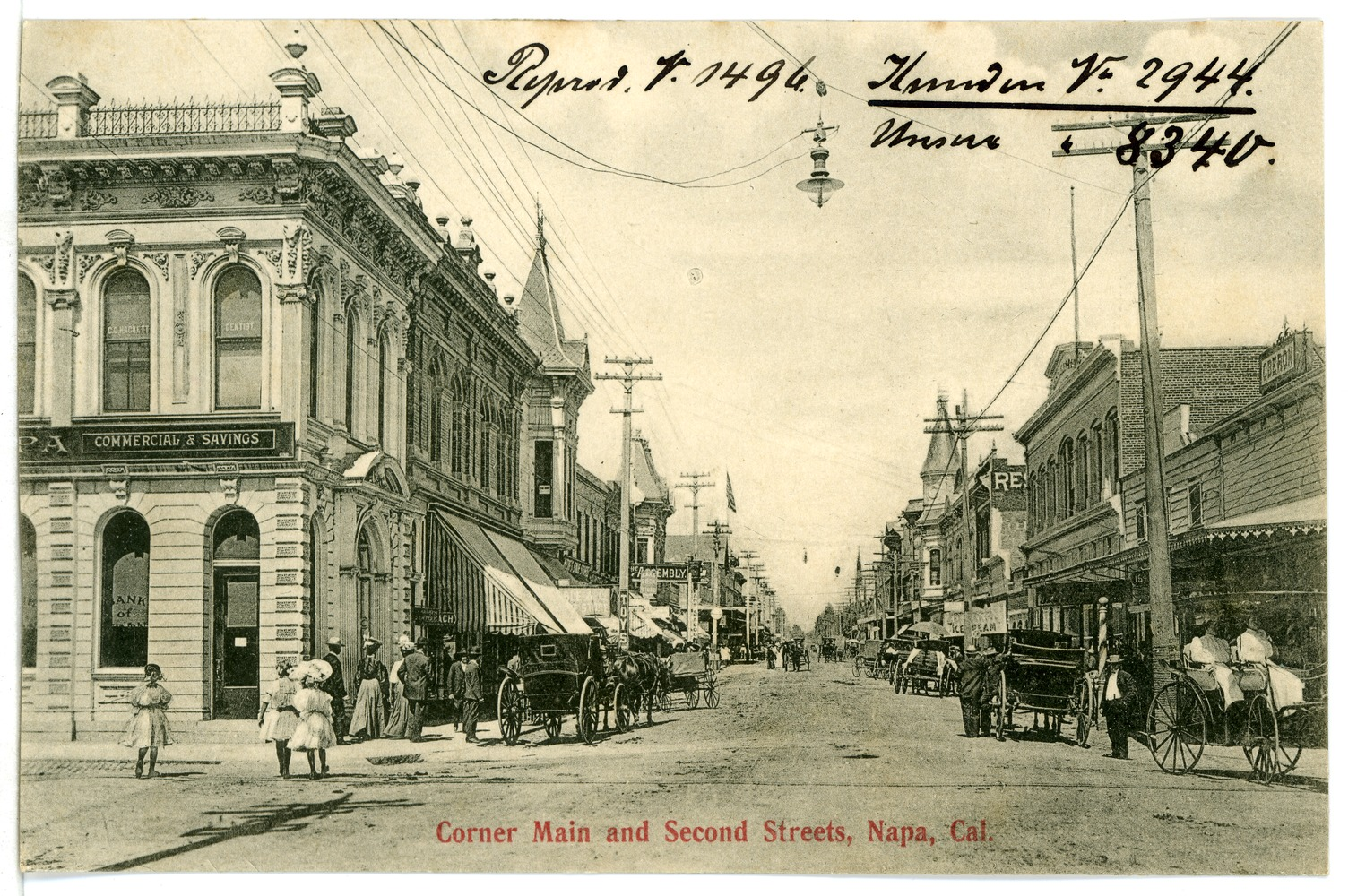
Downtown Napa in 1906

Napa had become the primary business and economic center for the Napa Valley by the dawn of the 20th century. The San Francisco, Napa and Calistoga Railway was established in 1905 for passenger and freight service. The railroad carried passengers from ferry boats in Vallejo to stops in Napa and other locations in the valley.

As agricultural and wine interests developed north of the city limits, much of the light industry, banking, commercial and retail activity in the county evolved within the city of Napa and in earlier times along the Napa River through the historic downtown. Napa Glove Factory was established in 1903 and was the largest plant of its kind west of Chicago.

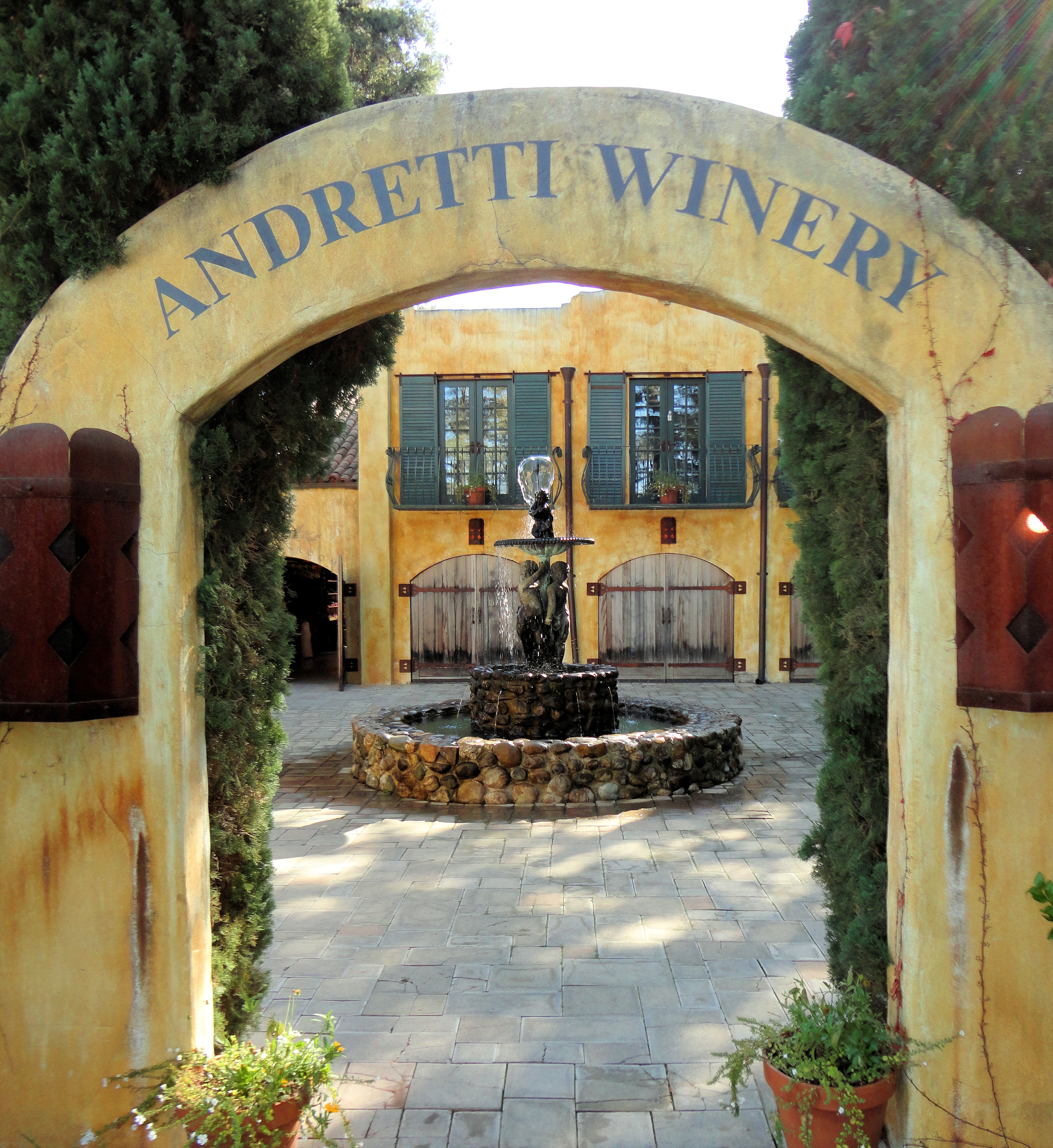
Andretti Winery, founded by Mario Andretti in 1996

Edwin Pridham and Peter L. Jensen invented the moving-coil loudspeaker in 1915 in their Napa workshop while working on an improvement for the telephone receiver. Pridham and Jensen went on to found the Magnavox Company in 1917. In the late 19th century and early 20th century, Napa was known for having a sizable red-light district, with brothels primarily concentrated on and around Clinton Street.

==== Flooding ====
Following studies made by the U.S. Department of the Interior in 1930–40s, the U.S. Congress authorized channel improvements on Napa River and construction of a dam on Conn Creek as part of the Flood Control Act of 1944, though funding was never approved. The City of Napa funded and built the dam in order to create the water conservation reservoir Lake Hennessey in 1948; however, flooding continued to be a problem.

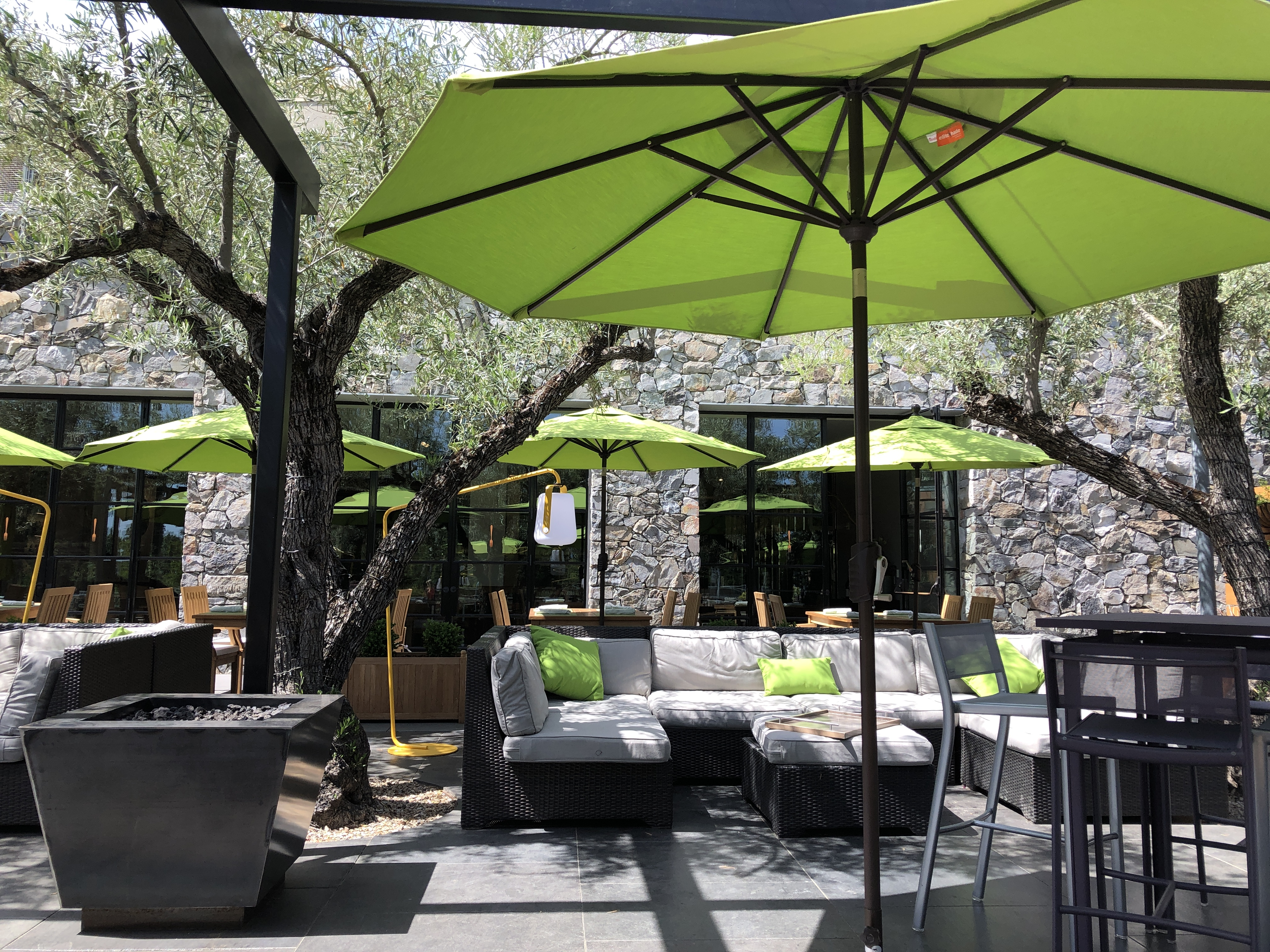
The Culinary Institute of America at Copia opened in 2016.

The 1986 Napa River flood revived public interest in finding a remedy. After a plan to widen the river channel proposed by the Army Corps of Engineers was presented in 1995 and roundly rejected, a group of special interests called Friends of the River formed, which built consensus on a "living river" plan. Voters in the County of Napa narrowly approved an increase of sales tax in a March 1998 election to fund the Napa River Flood Project. In 2005, the Napa River again flooded the entire downtown area and destroyed 1,000 homes across the county.

An ambitious redevelopment plan encompassing several blocks of downtown Napa's retail property was undertaken by the city in the early 1970s, though it did little to improve the city's economy. Downtown Napa finally began to recover and emerge from a long economic slumber in the 2000s, triggered by a significant growth in Main Street restaurants and hotels. The redevelopment of First and Main streets and the Napa Mill complex helped to stimulate investments along the Napa riverfront.

==== Earthquake ====
In 2014, the Napa area was struck by a magnitude 6.1 earthquake centered 3.7 miles (6.0 km) northwest of nearby American Canyon. In October 2017, the Atlas Fire and Partrick Fires burned several parts of Napa County (see also October 2017 Northern California wildfires).

== Geography ==
According to the United States Census Bureau, the city has a total area of 18.4 square miles (48 km^{2}), of which 18.0 square miles (47 km^{2}) is land and 0.3 square miles (0.78 km^{2}), or 1.67%, is water. Napa was the first location in California to be part of the North Coast American Viticultural Area. renowned for its wine due to the Mediterranean climate.

The Napa River traverses the city on its journey to the San Pablo Bay. The city has conducted a variety of waterfront development along the banks of the river, including certain fill operations governed by the United States Army Corps of Engineers regulations. The Napa River Flood Project has been in progress since the late 1990s, with the goal of mitigating the risk of flooding along a 6-mile (9.7 km) stretch of the river and 1-mile (1.6 km) of Napa Creek.

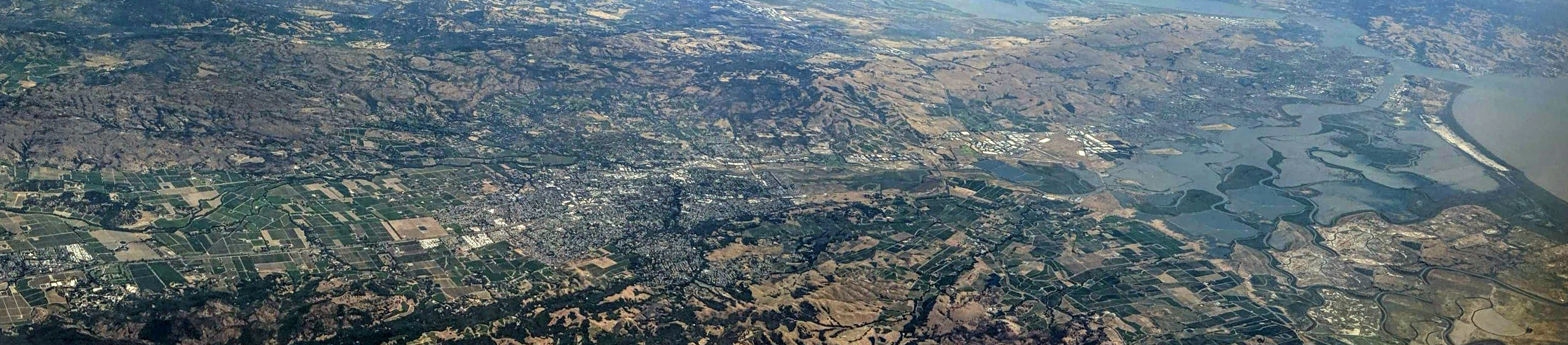
Aerial view of the Napa Valley, with the city of Napa is located in the center. Yountville is on the left and San Pablo Bay is on the right.

=== Climate ===
Napa has a Mediterranean climate similar to many other parts of Northern California. Winters are cool and damp and summers are warm and dry. During the summer months rain is rare. Occasionally there may be a day or two of light rain in June and September. Heat waves do occur, with the temperatures rising above 100 °F (37.8 °C). Wildfires can be a problem during the summer months. The fall is pleasant and many people come to visit Napa at this time. The winters are quite wet and cool and flooding can be a problem. Nighttime temperatures occasionally drop below freezing (32 °F or 0 °C). The rainy season is from October to April and occasionally into May. Snow is rare. The hottest temperature recorded in Napa was 114 °F (45.6 °C) on September 6, 2022, while the coldest was 14 °F (−10 °C) on December 22, 1990. The wettest "rain year" was from July 1982 to June 1983 with 50.18 inches or 1,274.6 millimetres, and the driest from July 1923 to June 1924 with only 10.26 inches or 260.6 millimetres. The most rainfall in one month was 16.13 inches or 409.7 millimetres in December 1955.

Climate data for Napa, California (Napa County Airport), 1991–2020 normals, extremes 1893–present
Month	Jan	Feb	Mar	Apr	May	Jun	Jul	Aug	Sep	Oct	Nov	Dec	Year
Record high °F (°C)	85 (29)	86 (30)	92 (33)	95 (35)	104 (40)	113 (45)	110 (43)	110 (43)	114 (46)	106 (41)	90 (32)	81 (27)	114 (46)
Mean maximum °F (°C)	67.1 (19.5)	73.4 (23.0)	79.0 (26.1)	86.7 (30.4)	91.6 (33.1)	98.3 (36.8)	98.2 (36.8)	98.1 (36.7)	98.2 (36.8)	91.4 (33.0)	78.2 (25.7)	66.9 (19.4)	102.5 (39.2)
Mean daily maximum °F (°C)	56.9 (13.8)	60.9 (16.1)	64.2 (17.9)	68.1 (20.1)	73.1 (22.8)	78.3 (25.7)	78.7 (25.9)	80.0 (26.7)	80.3 (26.8)	75.4 (24.1)	65.1 (18.4)	57.3 (14.1)	69.9 (21.0)
Daily mean °F (°C)	47.6 (8.7)	50.4 (10.2)	53.0 (11.7)	55.8 (13.2)	60.5 (15.8)	65.1 (18.4)	66.7 (19.3)	67.2 (19.6)	65.7 (18.7)	60.6 (15.9)	52.7 (11.5)	47.5 (8.6)	57.7 (14.3)
Mean daily minimum °F (°C)	38.2 (3.4)	40.0 (4.4)	41.7 (5.4)	43.5 (6.4)	47.8 (8.8)	51.8 (11.0)	54.8 (12.7)	54.4 (12.4)	51.0 (10.6)	45.9 (7.7)	40.4 (4.7)	37.6 (3.1)	45.6 (7.6)
Mean minimum °F (°C)	29.5 (−1.4)	32.4 (0.2)	34.3 (1.3)	36.8 (2.7)	41.9 (5.5)	46.5 (8.1)	50.3 (10.2)	49.8 (9.9)	46.1 (7.8)	40.3 (4.6)	33.3 (0.7)	29.1 (−1.6)	27.4 (−2.6)
Record low °F (°C)	19 (−7)	23 (−5)	23 (−5)	27 (−3)	30 (−1)	34 (1)	38 (3)	37 (3)	36 (2)	28 (−2)	25 (−4)	14 (−10)	14 (−10)
Average precipitation inches (mm)	5.89 (150)	6.14 (156)	4.05 (103)	1.89 (48)	1.02 (26)	0.22 (5.6)	0.01 (0.25)	0.09 (2.3)	0.27 (6.9)	1.55 (39)	3.95 (100)	6.02 (153)	31.10 (790)
Average precipitation days (≥ 0.01 in)	9.9	9.8	9.6	5.9	3.2	1.0	0.1	0.2	1.0	3.2	7.2	10.3	61.4
Source 1: NOAA
Source 2: National Weather Service

== Demographics ==
Historical population
Census	Pop.	Note	%±
1850	159		—
1870	1,879		—
1880	3,731		98.6%
1890	4,395		17.8%
1900	4,036		−8.2%
1910	5,791		43.5%
1920	6,757		16.7%
1930	6,437		−4.7%
1940	7,740		20.2%
1950	13,579		75.4%
1960	22,170		63.3%
1970	36,103		62.8%
1980	50,879		40.9%
1990	61,842		21.5%
2000	72,585		17.4%
2010	76,915		6.0%
2020	79,246		3.0%
2025 (est.)	76,562	▼	−3.4%
U.S. Decennial Census; 1860–1870 1880-1890; 1900 1910 1920; 1930 1940 1950; 1960 1970 1980; 1990 2000 2010

=== 2020 census ===
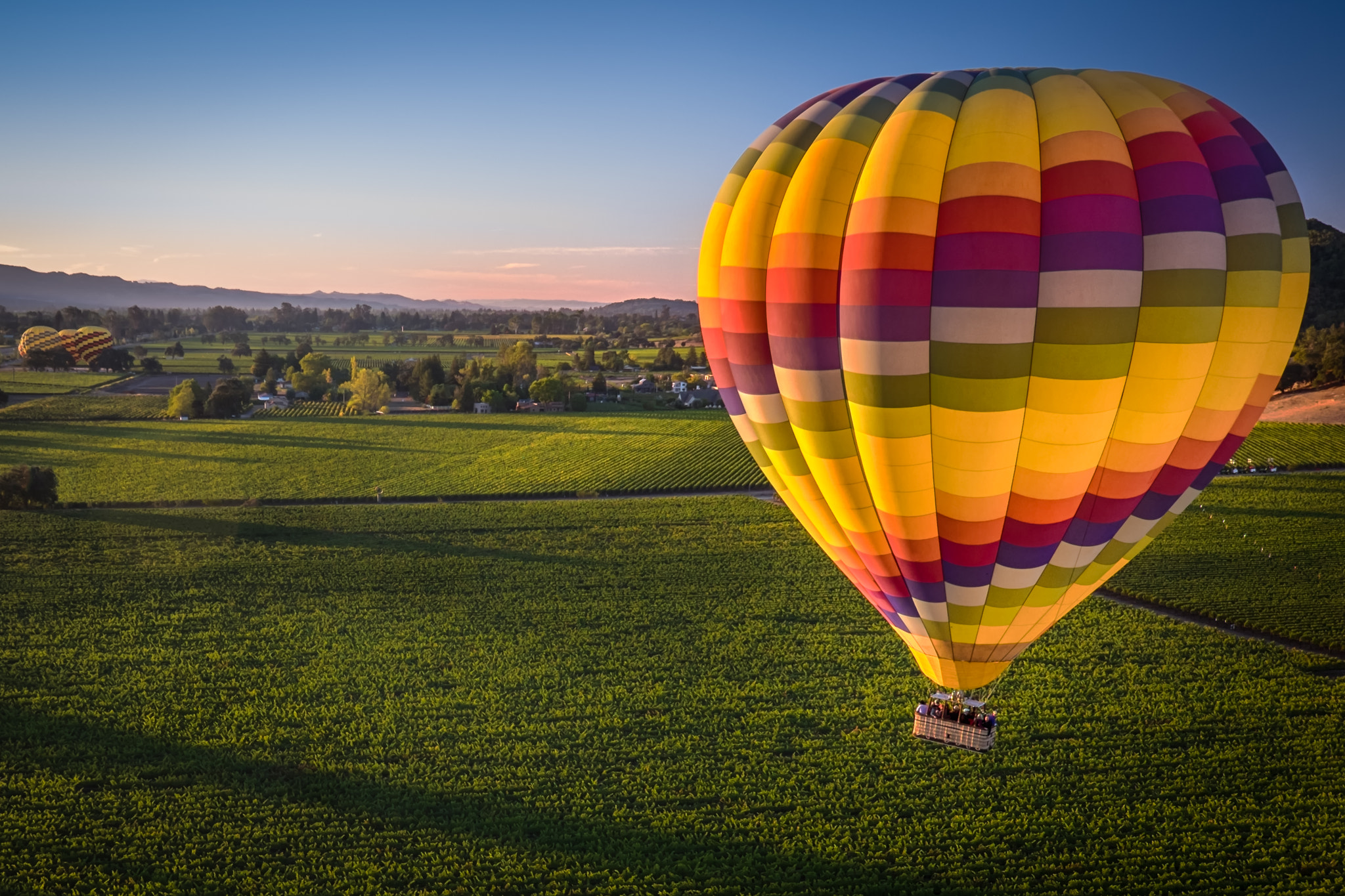
Hot air ballooning above vineyards is a popular attraction in Napa.

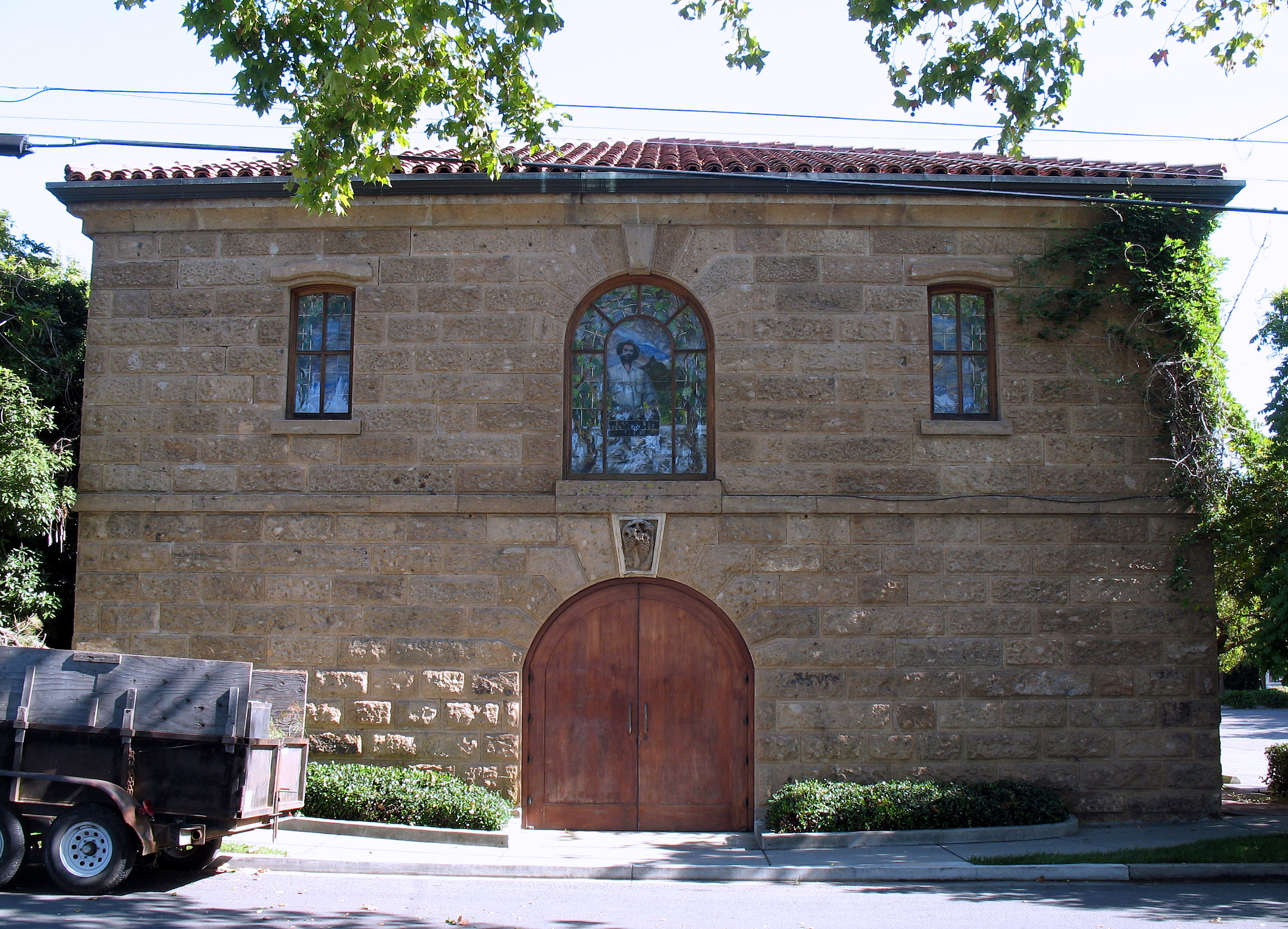
The historic Lisbon Winery, built in 1882

As of the 2020 census, Napa had a population of 79,246 and a population density of 4,391.1 inhabitants per square mile (1,695.4/km^{2}). The median age was 40.9 years; 20.6% of residents were under the age of 18, 7.7% were 18 to 24, 26.9% were 25 to 44, 26.4% were 45 to 64, and 18.5% were 65 years of age or older. For every 100 females, there were 95.7 males, and for every 100 females age 18 and over, there were 93.8 males age 18 and over.

99.7% of residents lived in urban areas, while 0.3% lived in rural areas. The census reported that 97.0% of the population lived in households, 1.8% lived in non-institutionalized group quarters, and 1.2% were institutionalized.

There were 29,356 households in Napa, of which 30.7% had children under the age of 18 living in them. Of all households, 48.3% were married-couple households, 7.3% were cohabiting-couple households, 16.1% were households with a male householder and no spouse or partner present, and 28.3% were households with a female householder and no spouse or partner present. About 26.5% of all households were made up of individuals and 13.6% had someone living alone who was 65 years of age or older. The average household size was 2.62, and there were 19,236 families (65.5% of all households).

There were 31,071 housing units at an average density of 1,721.7 units per square mile (664.8 units/km^{2}), and 29,356 (94.5%) were occupied. Of all housing units, 5.5% were vacant. The homeowner vacancy rate was 1.1% and the rental vacancy rate was 4.4%. Of occupied units, 56.2% were owner-occupied and 43.8% were occupied by renters.

Racial composition as of the 2020 census
Race	Number	Percent
White	46,173	58.3%
Black or African American	634	0.8%
American Indian and Alaska Native	1,260	1.6%
Asian	2,082	2.6%
Native Hawaiian and Other Pacific Islander	143	0.2%
Some other race	16,190	20.4%
Two or more races	12,764	16.1%
Hispanic or Latino (of any race)	31,572	39.8%

== Economy ==
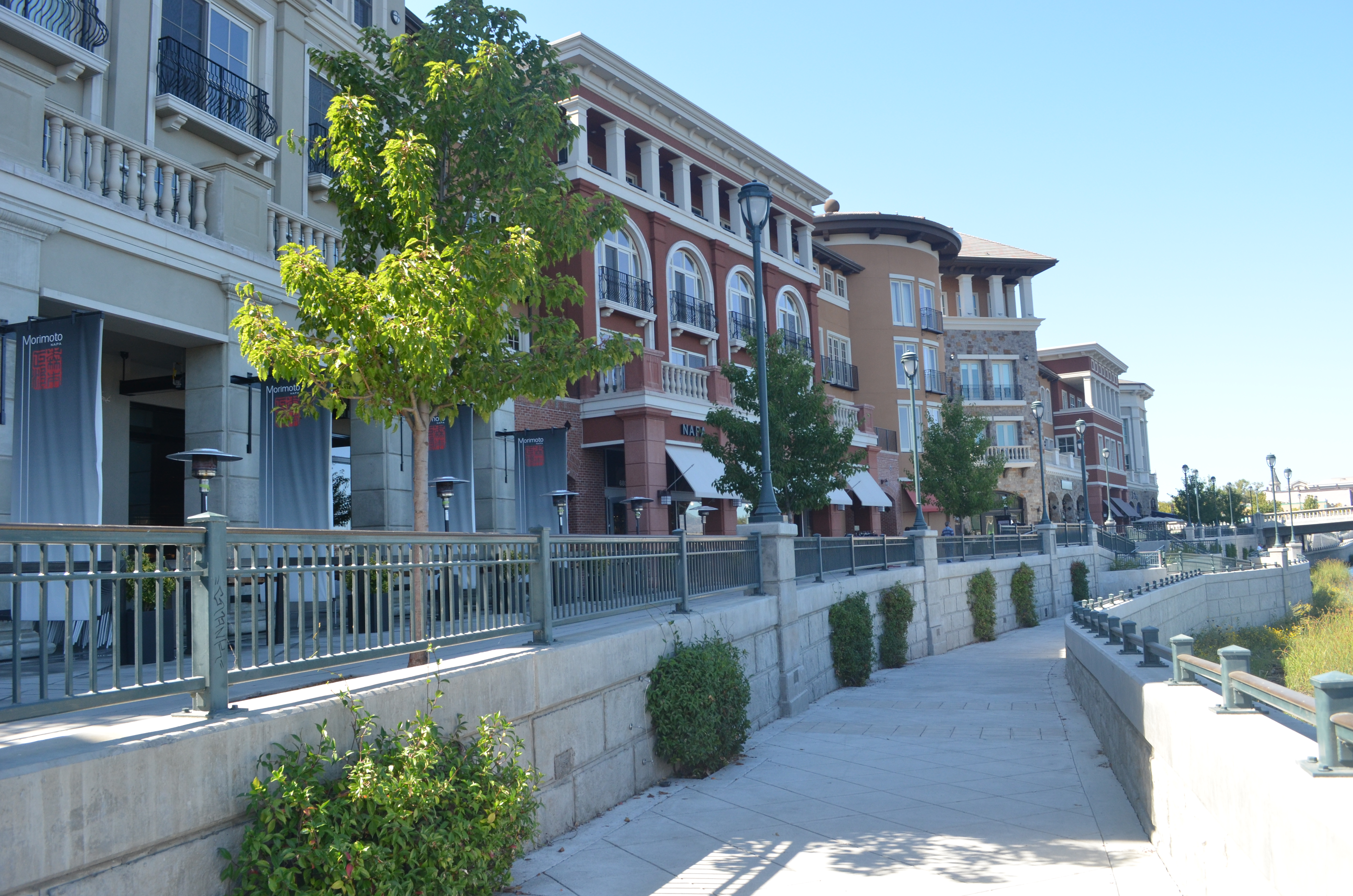
Waterfront along the Napa River

Napa's economy is characterized by its position as one of the principal cities of Wine Country, resulting in a significant portion of jobs in the city relating to wineries, restaurants, hotels, and other hospitality industries.

The Napa State Hospital is located in Imola, an unincorporated area bordering the city of Napa.

The Napa Valley Business Park is located adjacent to the Napa County Airport in an unincorporated area of Napa County. Employers in the area include The Doctors Company and Treasury Wine Estates.

Top employers

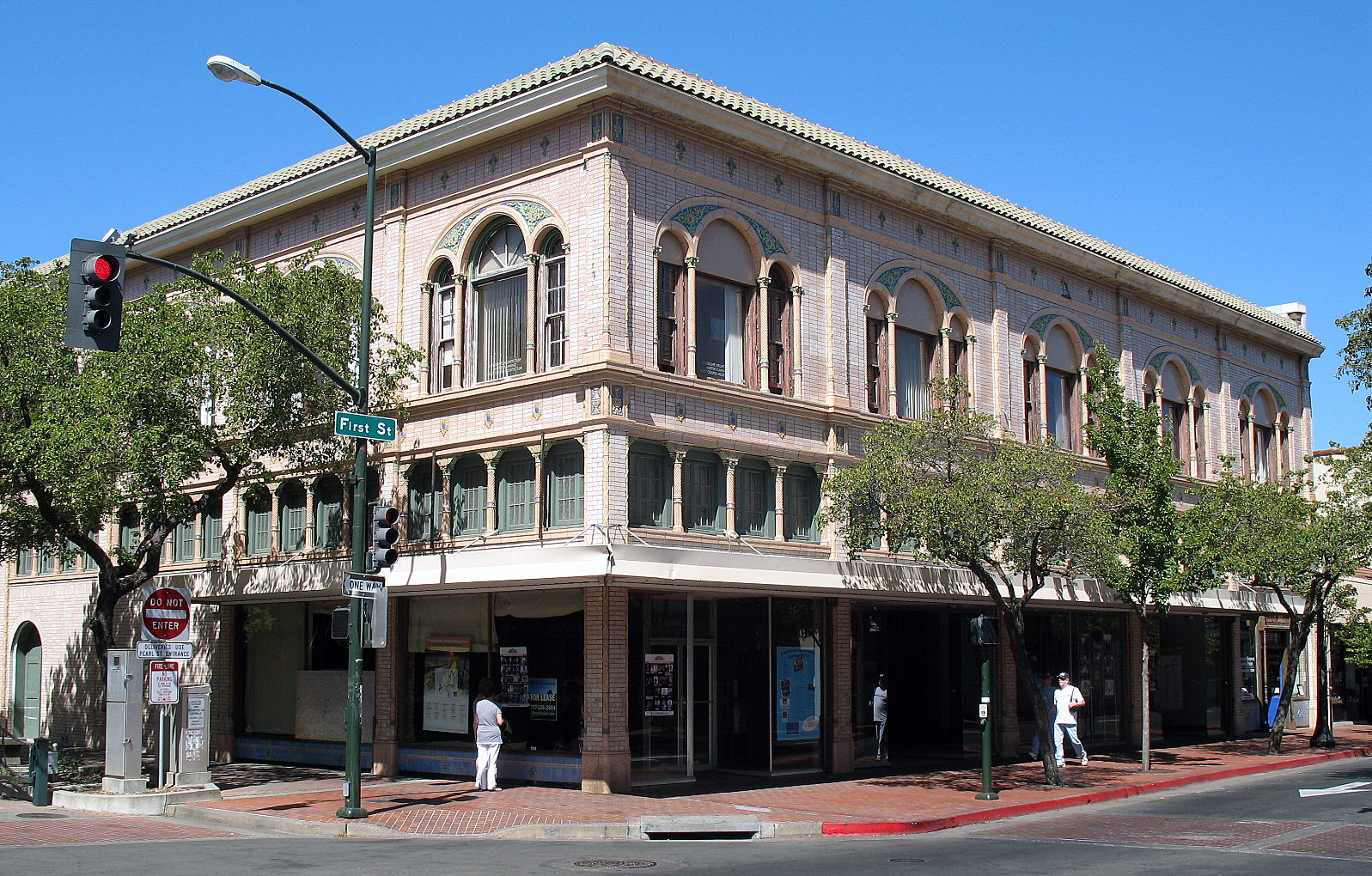
The eclectic Spanish Colonial Revival style Gordon Building

The town's comprehensive annual financial report for the fiscal year that ended June 30, 2020, lists the top ten employers in the City of Napa as the following:

No.	Top Employers	Employees
1	Napa Valley Unified School District	1,735
2	County of Napa	1,507
3	Queen of the Valley Medical Center	1,209
4	City of Napa	434
5	Walmart	300
6	Napa Valley College	290
7	Kaiser Permanente	262
8	The Meadows of Napa Valley Assisted Living	193
9	Napa Valley Wine Train	193
10	The Westin Verasa Napa	168

== Government ==
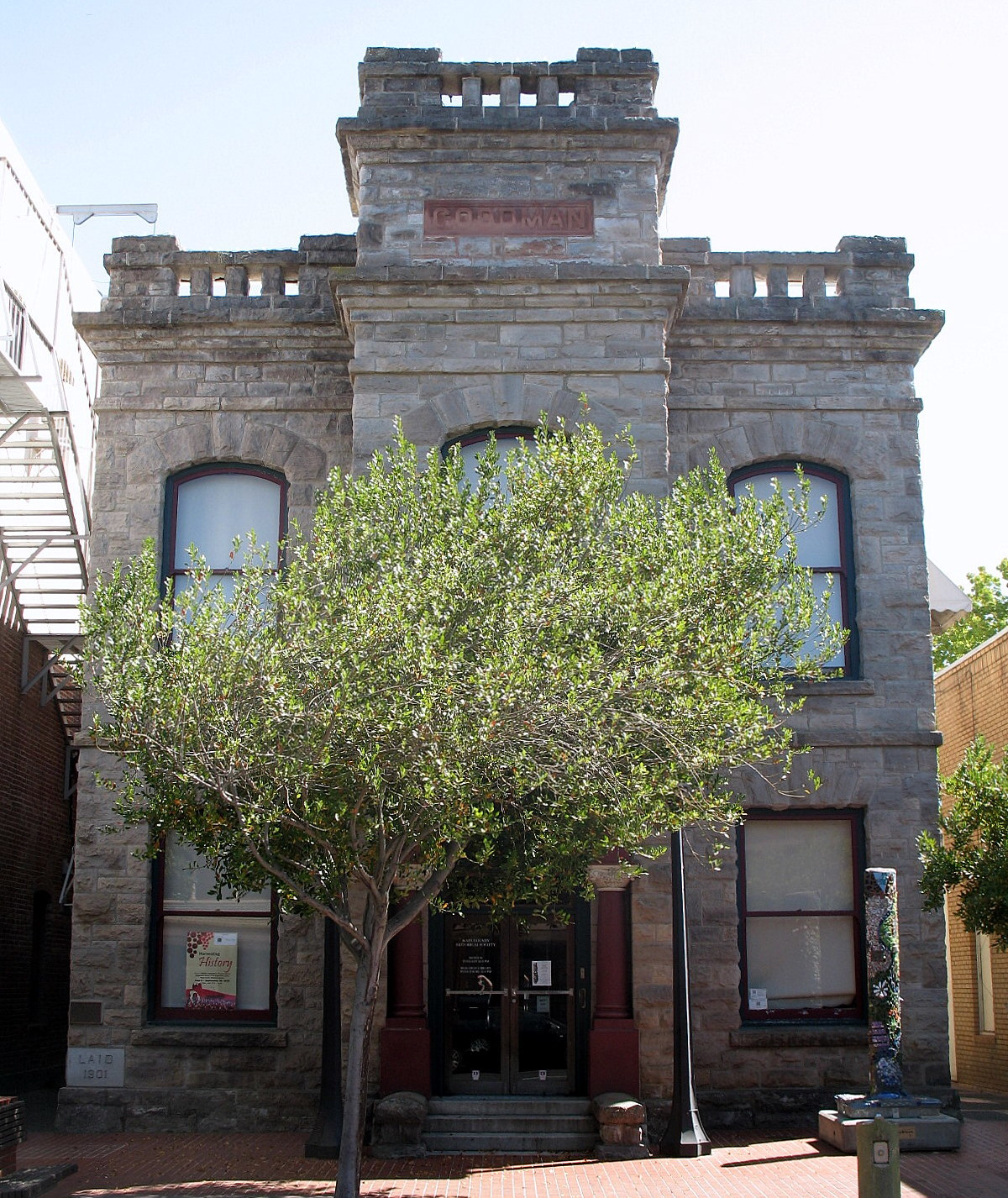
The Goodman Library

In the California State Legislature, Napa is in the 3rd senatorial district, represented by Democrat Christopher Cabaldon, and in the 4th Assembly district, represented by Democrat Cecilia Aguiar-Curry. In the United States House of Representatives, Napa is in California's 4th congressional district, represented by Democrat Mike Thompson.

== Transportation ==
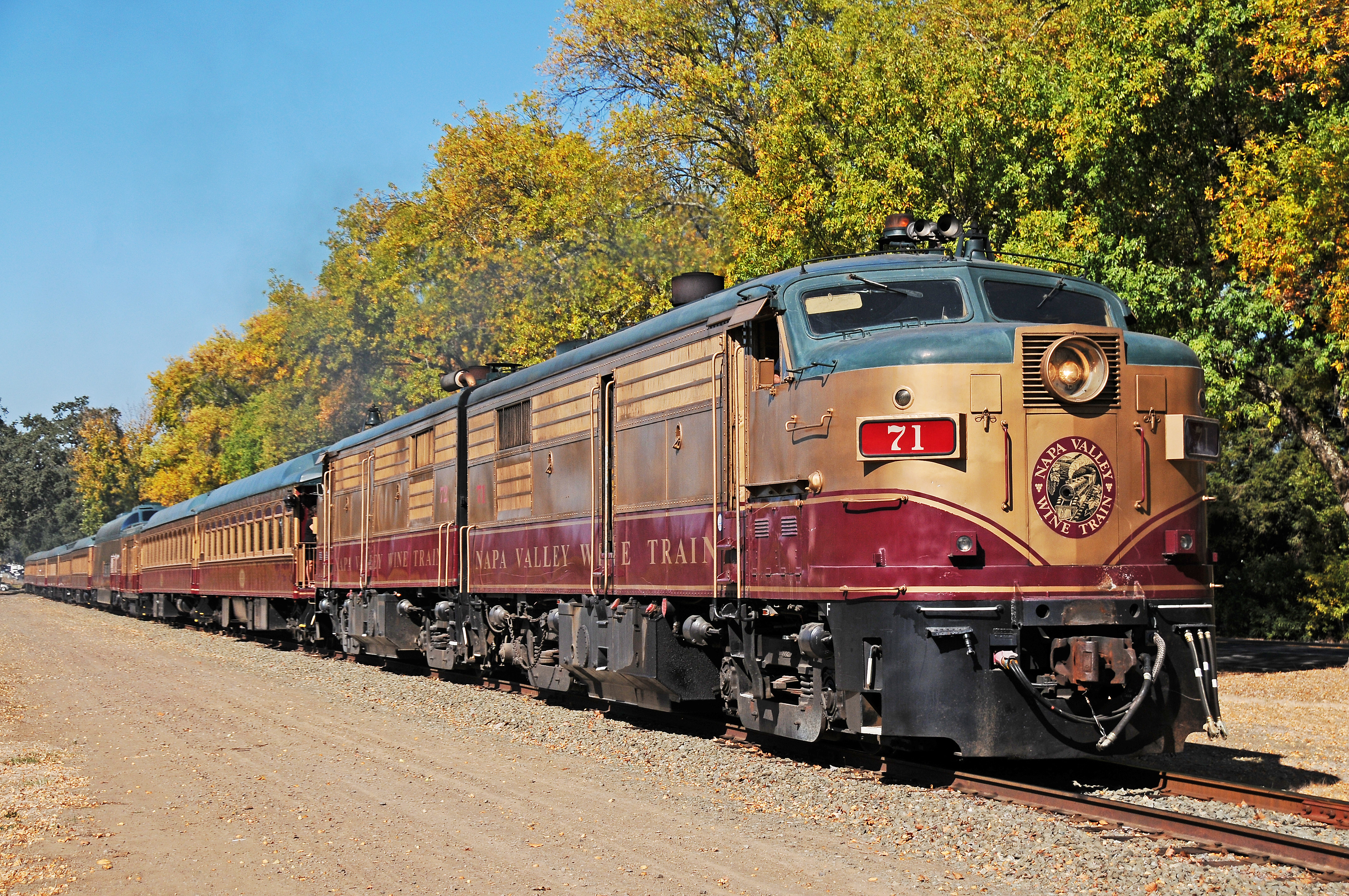
The Napa Valley Wine Train

CA-29 runs through Napa, connecting to Vallejo and the East Bay Area to the south and the Napa Wine Country to the north. CA-12 runs to the south of the city, connecting to Fairfield and Interstate 80 to the east and Sonoma and US-101 to the west.

Napa is also served by several airports: Oakland and San Francisco International 50 miles (80 km) to the south, Sonoma County 30 miles (48 km) northwest, and Sacramento International Airport 65 miles (105 km) northeast. Napa County Airport to the south, also serves as a small public airport.

Valley Intercity Neighborhood Express, more commonly known by the acronym "VINE Transit", is the public transportation service for Napa as well as for Napa County. It is managed by the Napa Valley Transportation Authority and is operated by Veolia Transportation. VINE has additional service throughout the county and has connections to other public transportation systems in the nearby counties.

The Amtrak Thruway 7 bus makes daily stops in Napa to/from the Soscol Gateway Transit Center at 825 Burnell Street. From there, connections are available to Martinez to the south, and Arcata to the north.

Wine Country Airport Shuttle, Napa Valley Airporter provides daily service to and from Oakland International Airport and San Francisco International Airport daily from their main office on CA-29.

== Notable people ==
- Larry Allen, former NFL player
- Max Alvarez, soccer player
- Alisa Bellettini, television producer, creator of House of Style
- Jerry Bohlander, mixed martial arts fighter
- Phil Bonifield, NASCAR driver
- Brock Bowers, NFL tight end for the Las Vegas Raiders
- John Boyett, former NFL player
- Warren Brusstar, MLB player
- Bill Buckner, MLB player
- Cristina García, novelist
- Mike Gibson, NFL player for the Arizona Cardinals
- Bill Green, former U.S. and NCAA record holder in Track and Field, 5th place in the hammer throw at the 1984 Olympic Games
- Steve Hendrickson, former NFL player
- Adam Housley, Fox News correspondent and husband of actress Tamera Mowry
- Josh Jackson, NBA player
- Joe Kmak, MLB player for the Milwaukee Brewers and Chicago Cubs
- Jim Landis, MLB player
- Ray Manzarek, The Doors keyboard player
- Scott McCarron, Professional Golfer
- Edward J. Megarr, United States Marine Corps major general
- Peter Menzel, photographer
- Johnny Miller, golfer
- Olivia O'Brien, musician
- Donny Robinson, Olympic BMX bronze medalist
- Andrew Talansky, Professional Cyclist for Cannondale-Garmin
- Shirley Walker, film score composer
- Charles Woodson, former NFL player and Heisman Trophy winner.

== Sister cities ==
Napa's sister cities are:

- Casablanca, Chile
- Iwanuma, Japan, since February 15, 1973
- Launceston, Australia

== See also ==
- List of cities and towns in California
- List of cities and towns in the San Francisco Bay Area
- Napa Valley AVA
- Napa Valley Register
- Wine Country
