= Alisa Bellettini =

American television producer

- Born: Alisa Marie Bellettini; October 1, 1954; Napa, California
- Died: February 16, 2016 (aged 61); Sacramento, California
- Occupation: Television producer
- Notable work: creator of House of Style

Alisa Marie Bellettini (October 1, 1954 – February 16, 2016) was an American television producer. In 1989, Bellettini created the landmark MTV television series, House of Style. The series, originally hosted by supermodel Cindy Crawford, brought together fashion, modeling, music and pop culture. Bellettini produced the original run of the series, which aired on MTV for 78 episodes from 1989 to 2000.

House of Style, which brought together fashion and music, debuted on MTV in 1989. In an interview for the 2012 MTV oral history book, "I Want My MTV: The Uncensored Story of the Music Video Revolution," Bellettini recalled her original vision for the series, "I wanted to do a show about music and fashion because I loved fashion, and at the time, MTV was driven by music." Her other objective, in her role as show's creator and producer, was to "democratize" fashion by making it more accessible to average viewers. She later spoke of her vision for the show, "I just felt like I had to have a viewer in mind. I thought that the Midwest girl was really the person that I wanted to appeal to."

== Biography ==
=== Early life and career ===
Bellettini was born on October 1, 1954, in Napa, California. She began her career at a radio station before joining the staff of Rolling Stone magazine.

=== House of Style ===
In September 1988, Bellettini was hired by MTV News as a segment producer. MTV, which had only launched in 1981, was still a relatively young cable network at that point, but had become a strong influencer of pop culture. One of Bellettini's first assignments at MTV News was to interview the Beastie Boys, which Bellettini recalled in 2012, "They said, "Go interview the Beastie Boys." It was so much fun–they poured beer on my head."

Soon after Bellettini joined MTV, a network's executive, Doug Herzog, announced that MTV News would start covering fashion, in addition to its existing coverage of the music industry. Bellettini, who had been promoted to news writer, was a logical choice to write the copy for fashion stories in the small news department, "I was always stylish. And the two other writers in the news department, one was a Rastafarian and the other was reading Hitler books all the time." However, Kurt Loder, the main on-camera anchor at MTV News, was deeply uncomfortable with his new role covering fashion. Bellettini recalled in the 2012 interview for I Want My MTV: The Uncensored Story of the Music Video Revolution, recalled the awkward on-air transitions between music and fashion news, "Kurt Loder was our main news anchor, and fashion stories had to come out of Kurt's mouth. He was not comfortable doing it. The look on his face, going from a Guns N' Roses story to a fashion story–he looked like he was about to die."

Bellettini and other staffers soon received a memo from MTV's then-chief executive, Tom Freston, questioning why Kurt Loder was reporting fashion news. Bellettini read Freston's memo and conceived the idea of a new show focused on fashion, "That night, I wrote up a paragraph saying we should do a show about style." Doug Herzog replied to the proposal within 24 hours, granting Bellettini a budget for the new show. Herzog also told her that she needed to find a new host. Bellettini's first suggested Johnny Rotten, the former lead vocalist of the Sex Pistols, as host. However, Rotten was unavailable for the show.

Herzog told Bellettini is find an alternative host, since they could not get Rotten. He suggested that she read fashion magazines to find a possible host since the proposed show was focused on fashion. Bellettini, who had never read fashion magazines before, but noticed that the major models of the time were being called supermodels. She wanted a potential host who was firmly rooted in the fashion industry but could also attract male viewers. Bellettini decided on Cindy Crawford, a pick supported by Herzog, who had noticed her in his wife's magazines. However, Crawford's manager and modeling agency both said no to MTV's offer to have Crawford host the show. Crawford later explained her manager's reluctance to accept the offer, "My agents thought it was a waste of my time. I was making so much money modeling, per day, why take away from that? Other than Elsa Klensch on CNN, there was no fashion on TV. Look at how much TV has changed since then. Now, of course, an agent would say, "Yes, you should do it. And you should do a blog."

Undaunted, Bellettini asked Crawford's representatives to Crawford call her directly about the hosting offer. Cindy Crawford called Bellettini back and immediately agreed to host the show for free, as there was no budget for Crawford's salary.

House of Style debuted in May 1989 to high ratings. Herzog high-fived Bellettini once news of the ratings reached MTV's offices.

Bellettini remained the producer of House of Style during its original run from May 1989 until 2000. The show had an immediate effect on youth and popular culture. House of Style is credited with transforming Cindy Crawford's career, "Especially before the days of social media, it gave me an opportunity for people to know me as a person and not just in two dimensions," she later noted in 2012. Bellettini also supported the career of designer Todd Oldham, by having him host a regularly segment known as "Todd Time" during the 1990s. House of Style profiled designers, models and other figures within the industry that may have been little known to average Americans, with the goal of "democratizing fashion", including Naomi Campbell, Anna Sui and Marc Jacobs during their early careers. Bellettini also recruited musicians and other celebrities to appear with Crawford during its early years, including Nick Rhodes, Onyx, and Will Smith.

House of Style ran for 78 episodes during its original run. Cindy Crawford remained the show's host for the series' first six years. She was succeeded by a string of guest hosts after Crawford's departure, including Rebecca Romijn, Amber Valletta and Molly Sims. House of Style was ultimately trimmed down from a weekly series to an annual special before its cancellation in 2000.

Bellettini was also involved in other television projects, including Fox/MTV Guide to Summer '92 as a segment producer.

A documentary on the history of the show and its cultural impact, House of Style: Music, Models and MTV, aired on MTV on August 7, 2012. Bellettini, Crawford, Herzog and other important figures from House of Style appeared on the documentary. House of Style was relaunched online by MTV in 2012 and 2014.

Most recently, Bellettini had been focusing on a beauty blog.

Alisa Bellettini died in her sleep at her sister's home in Sacramento, California, on February 16, 2016, at the age of 61.
