= Gordon Building =

- U.S. National Register of Historic Places
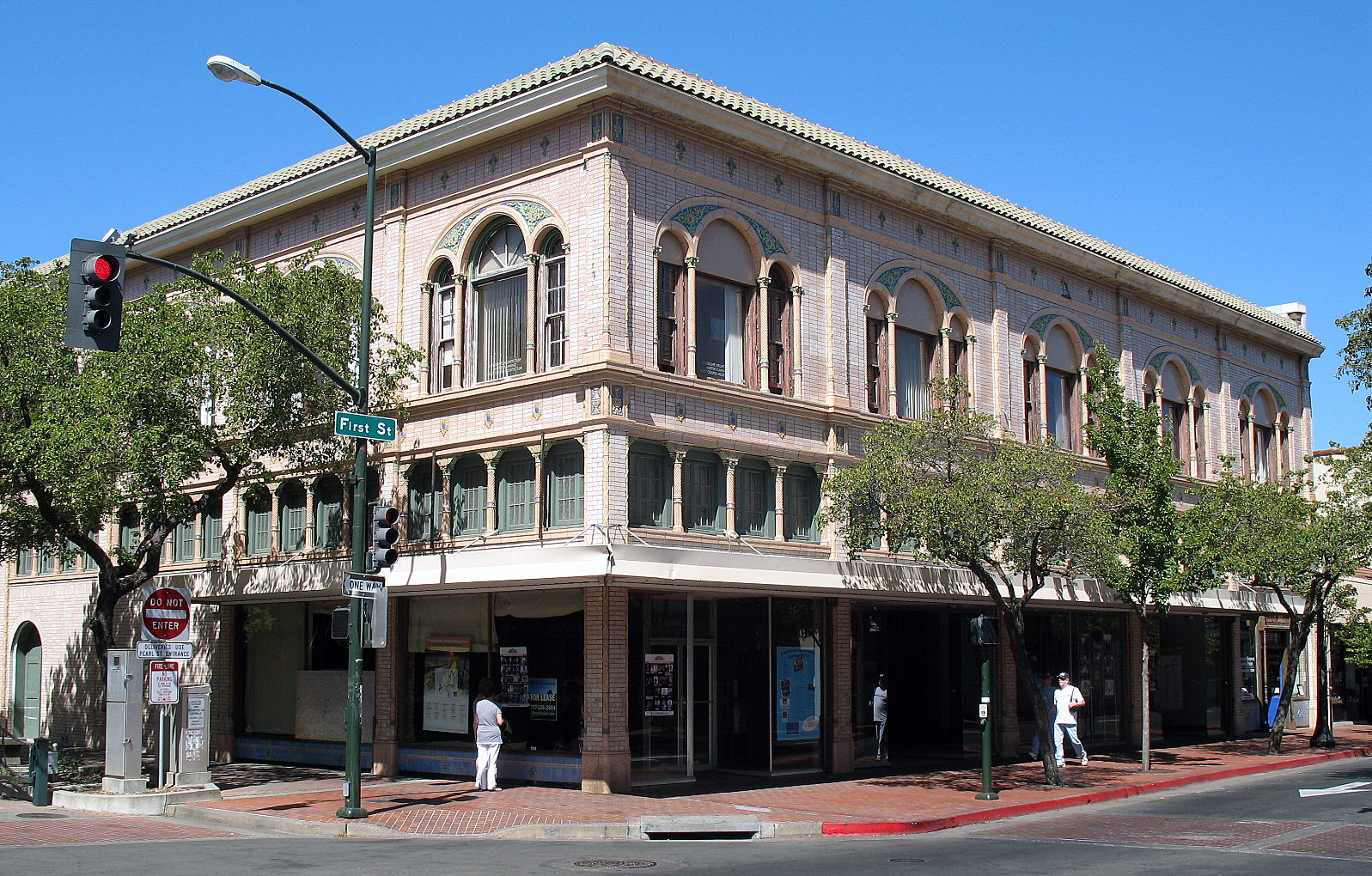

- Location within California Location within the United States
- Location: 1130 1st St., Napa, California
- Coordinates: 38°17′56″N 122°17′09″W
- Area: 0.2 acres (0.081 ha)
- Built: 1929, 1935
- Architect: C.L. Hunt
- Architectural style: Spanish Colonial Revival
- NRHP reference No.: 85002197
- Added to NRHP: September 12, 1985

The Gordon Building, at 1130 1st St. in Napa, California, was built in two sections, in 1929 and 1935. It was listed on the National Register of Historic Places in 1985. The 1929 section absorbed an earlier 1904 building.

The building has "Spanish Colonial Revival styling with strong Spanish Renaissance details are evident in the glazed terra cotta siding and cast molded and applied floral detailing."
