= Napa River Flood Project =

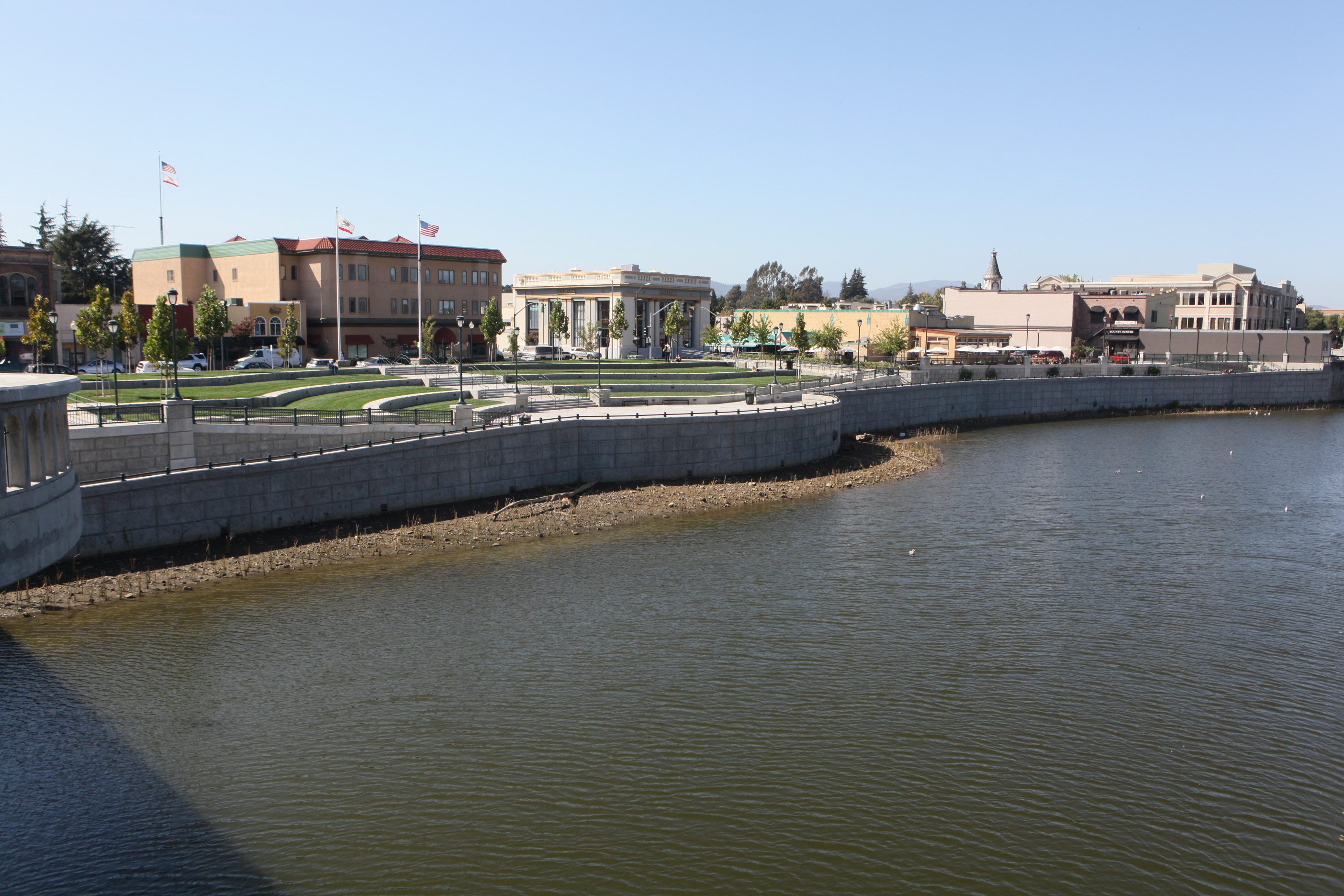
A portion of the Napa River floodwall constructed by the Corps of Engineers. Photo taken from the 3rd Street bridge.

The Napa River-Napa Creek Flood Protection Project is a flood control project of the US Army Corps of Engineers in the city of Napa, California. The Project area includes some 6 miles (9.7 km) of the Napa River from the Butler Bridge on State Route 29 on the south to Trancas Street on the north. This section is the upper reach of the estuary portion of the Napa River and as such is tidally influenced. The Project also includes improvements to 1 mile (1.6 km) of Napa Creek, the primary tributary to the Napa River. The project is cited as a new way of thinking about flood control due to its "living river" principles.

== History ==
=== Background ===
The Napa River runs some 55 miles (89 km) from Mount Saint Helena to San Pablo Bay and drains a watershed of about 426 square miles (1,100 km^{2}). The river is prone to seasonal flooding from November through April each year. Flooding that threatens lives and property occurs from the St. Helena south through Napa. Recorded history indicates there have been at least 22 serious floods on the Napa River since 1865. The most serious recent floods occurred in 2005, 1997, 1995, and 1986.

=== Approval ===
The US Congress authorized a flood protection project in the Napa in 1965 but no funding was provided. Needing matching funds at the local level to gain federal funding, local officials attempted to gain voter support twice in the 1970s but tax measures failed. A severe flood in 1986 regenerated interest and the Army Corps of Engineers was petitioned to reactivate the project. Nine years later, they presented a plan design to the local sponsor, the Napa County Flood Control and Water Conservation District. This design was not well received, as it relied on traditional flood control measures including straightening the main channel and constructing high floodwalls. Napa City Councilmember Cindy Watter described the COE design as a "gulag." Environmental organizations and regulatory agencies were concerned that the proposed project would increase sediment transport and negatively impact native species, including the anadromous steelhead trout. Locals were concerned that the project would reduce access to the river for recreation and inhibit economic development.

Local politicians and interest groups could not support the COE design as presented. Rather than submit it to voters for certain defeat, an ad hoc Community Coalition formed with the intent of re-working the design into a project with a chance of success. With the US Army Corps of Engineers and the Napa County Flood Control and Water Conservation District hoping to find a workable solution, a series of meetings involving some 25 agencies and 400 individuals took place over a two-year span. Groups taking key roles in the Community Coalition included Friends of the Napa River, Napa Valley Economic Development Corporation, Napa County Resource Conservation District, Napa Chamber of Commerce, San Francisco Bay Regional Water Quality Control Board, California Department of Fish and Game, Sierra Club, Napa Downtown Merchants, and the Flood Plain Business Coalition (also known as the "Red Zone Rangers"). After a prolonged period of design and redesign, a proposition called to fund the plan with a one half cent sales tax called Measure A was placed on the ballot for the county's voters in March 1998. Needing two-thirds support, the measure passed by a margin of 308 votes out of more than 27,000 ballots cast. Yountville was the only city to vote above the 66 2/3%. Their voting carried the passage of the proposition.

== Description ==
=== Objectives ===
Major objectives of the living river design include reconnecting the river to its historic flood plain, maintaining the natural slope and width of the river, allowing the river to meander as much as possible, retaining natural channel features like mud flats, shallows and sandbars, and supporting a continuous fish and riparian corridor along the river.

=== How it works ===
The average annual flow of the Napa River is about 1,300 cubic feet per second (37 m^{3}/s) through the populated center of the City of Napa. During a 100-year flood, the flow increases to an estimated 41,000 cu ft/s (1,200 m^{3}/s) to 46,000 cu ft/s (1,300 m^{3}/s). The Napa River-Napa Creek Flood Protection Project employs a combination of traditional and innovative approaches to reduce the flooding threat. In the downstream project area, dikes have been removed and tidal marshlands have been restored; bridges have been replaced to remove obstacles to water flow; riverbank terracing has been done to provide more room for large volumes of water; a dry bypass channel will be excavated to create a shortcut for fast moving floodwaters to pass through the Oxbow area; new dikes, levees and floodwalls will be built; bank stabilization will be used in specific areas; and detention basins and pump stations will accommodate runoff behind the floodwalls.

After much lobbying, work on the Napa Creek portion on the project started in November 2010. This portion of the project was undertaken to control potential flooding in an area along Napa Creek between Jefferson Street and the Napa River in downtown Napa. This area is even more prone to flooding than the river itself. Work in this portion of the project included removal and replacement of existing vehicle bridges, installation of new culvert and reshaping of the creek's bank. Much of this portion of the project was completed in 2013. The project has also funded other river related projects up valley from the work being done in the City of Napa. The remaining work on the project included construction of a flood bypass channel which was finished in 2015.

== Funding and controversy ==
Revenues from the 1998 voter approved Measure A half cent sales tax have exceeded expectations and the United States Congress and the California State Legislature have supplemented funding on an intermittent basis with appropriations during the life of the project. In December 2009, United States Senators John McCain and Tom Coburn criticized a $54 million appropriation for replacing two existing railroad trestle bridges over the river with higher ones. The money in the appropriation was part of the American Recovery and Reinvestment Act of 2009. Replacement of these bridges were part of the project's original plan and the $85 million contract for the work was awarded to the Alaska Native corporation Suulutaaq Inc. McCain and Coburn included the appropriation on a list of 100 “wasteful or silly" projects in their 2009 “Stimulus Checkup” report. The bridges are utilized by the privately owned Napa Valley Wine Train. An official spokesman for the City of Napa along with several elected officials accused McCain and Coburn of political grandstanding for including the funding in their report. In 2011, the price of the project was projected to reach $440 million by completion. The half cent sales tax is due to expire in 2018. In early 2012, the Army Corps of Engineers announced that it was allocating $1.3 million to continue federal supervision of the work currently funded on the project which is scheduled for completion in 2013. The project will need additional federal funding of $20 million in order to proceed with construction of a flood control channel that will carry 50% of river flow during potential flooding conditions. Lack of funding could potentially delay completion of the project until 2018. The Obama Administration's proposed 2012 -2013 proposed budget released on February 13. 2012 included no funding allocation for the project. While the Army Corps of Engineers considered their work on the project complete in 2015 following the building of the bypass channel between Veteran's Park and the Oxbow district, Napa County Flood Control and Water Conservation District officials have asked them to continue with other work along the river in order to protect 2000 additional parcels from flooding. This work consists of additional flood walls in the Oxbow district along with other flood walls north and south of downtown Napa and building a pump station at the bypass. The measure A half cent sales tax expired on June 30, 2018. While much of the project's original objectives have been completed, others still remain.

== Awards ==
The Napa River-Napa Creek Flood Protection Project has received numerous awards including:

- 1998 American Institute of Architects Award
- 1998 American Institute of Landscape Architects Award
- 1998 California League of Cities Helen Putnam Award
- 1999 Outstanding Comprehensive Conservation and Management Plan Implementation Project Award from the San Francisco Bay State Estuary Conference
- 1999 Governor's Environmental and Economic Leadership Award from the California EPA
- 2004 Proclamation of Appreciation from the California Regional Water Quality Control Board, San Francisco Bay Region
