= Napa River flood of 1986 =

Severe weather event in Napa, California

Napa River Flood of 1986
Meteorological history
- Duration: February 1986

Overall effects
- Fatalities: 3
- Damage: 7000 people evacuated, 250 homes destroyed
- Areas affected: Napa County

The Napa River flood of 1986 is considered by many to be the worst flood experienced by Napa, California, United States, during the 20th century. Twenty inches of rain fell in a 48-hour period; 7,000 people were evacuated, 250 homes were destroyed and another 2,500 were damaged. Three people died, and estimated damages reached $100 million.

Following the flood, residents expressed a renewed urgency to mitigate flooding caused by winter storms, which created obstacles that slowed the flow of the river on its course to San Francisco Bay. Since the flood, the Napa County Flood Control and Water Conservation District has worked to manage floods through the Napa River Flood Project. Another flood of lesser proportions occurred on December 31, 2005, after over a week of rain. Smaller floods also occurred in 1995 and 1997.
