= House of Style =

- Genre: News
- Created by: Alisa Bellettini
- Directed by: Joshua Homnick; Steve Paley
- Presented by: Cindy Crawford; Amber Valletta; Shalom Harlow; Daisy Fuentes; Rebecca Romijn; Molly Sims; Bar Refaeli; Iggy Azalea
- Country of origin: United States
- Original language: English

Production
- Executive producer: Alisa Bellettini
- Production locations: Los Angeles, California, United States

Original release
- Network: MTV
- Release: May 1989 – 2000
- Release: October 16, 2012

House of Style is an MTV show that premiered in May 1989, focusing on America's growing fascination with the "supermodel" craze. The show focused on fashion, lives of models, the modeling industry, and topics such as eating disorders.

== Overview ==
The show was produced by Edward Christiansen and directed by Joshua Homnick and Steve Paley and during its eleven-year run, featured a variety of hosts, most of whom were professional models, including original host Cindy Crawford, as well as Rebecca Romijn and Molly Sims, whom the show helped make into household names. Following Crawford's six-year run, MTV cut the number of episodes ordered for each year after her departure until the show was reduced to a yearly special and then ultimately canceled in 2000.

Other hosts of House of Style included Amber Valletta, Shalom Harlow, and Daisy Fuentes, while ex-Germs/Nirvana/Foo Fighters guitarist Pat Smear was featured in regular segments during Crawford's years as host.

== Revival ==
The show was revived for one episode on March 21, 2009, with Bar Refaeli as the host and Chanel Iman as a correspondent.

The show returned to MTV.com as a web series on August 7, 2014, with rapper and model Iggy Azalea as the host.

== See also ==
- Style with Elsa Klensch
