= California Historical Landmarks in Napa County =

List table of the properties and districts listed as California Historical Landmarks within Napa County, California.

- Note: Click the "Map of all coordinates" link to the right to view a Google map of all properties and districts with latitude and longitude coordinates in the table below.

== Listings ==
Image		Landmark name	Location	City or town	Summary
Beringer Brothers Winery	814	Beringer Brothers Winery	2000 Main St. 38°30′38″N 122°28′52″W	St. Helena	
Calistoga Depot	687	Calistoga Depot	1458 Lincoln Ave. 38°34′48″N 122°34′42″W	Calistoga	
Charles Krug Winery	563	Charles Krug Winery	2800 Main St. 38°31′02″N 122°29′20″W	St. Helena	
Chiles Mill	547	Chiles Mill	Chiles and Pope Rd. and Lower Chiles Valley Rd. 38°32′07″N 122°20′14″W	St. Helena	
First Presbyterian Church	878	First Presbyterian Church	1333-3rd St between Randolph and Franklin Sts. 38°17′48″N 122°17′13″W	Napa	
George Yount's Blockhouse	564	George Yount's Blockhouse	Cook Rd. and Yount Mill Rd. 38°25′16″N 122°22′12″W	Yountville	
Grave of George Yount	693	Grave of George Yount	George C. Yount Pioneer Cemetery, Lincoln and Jackson Sts. 38°24′31″N 122°22′07″W	Yountville	
Upload Photo	683	Hudson Cabin	Hwy 29 & Lincoln Ave. 38°34′31″N 122°34′50″W	Calistoga	
Upload Photo	686	Kelsey House	Hwy 29 & Diamond Mtn. Rd. 38°34′02″N 122°33′55″W	Calistoga	
Upload Photo	939	Litto's Hubcap Ranch	6654 Pope Valley Rd. 38°38′12″N 122°27′12″W	Pope Valley	Part of the 20th century folk art environments project.
Old Bale Mill	359	Old Bale Mill	Bale Grist Mill State Historic Park; 38°32′29″N 122°30′30″W	St. Helena	
Robert Louis Stevenson State Park	710	Robert Louis Stevenson State Park	Robert Louis Stevenson State Park; 38°39′12″N 122°36′12″W	Yountville	
Sam Brannan Cottage	685	Sam Brannan Cottage	1311 Washington St. 38°34′44″N 122°34′50″W	Calistoga	
Upload Photo	684	Sam Brannan Store	Wapoo Ave and Grant St; 38°34′58″N 122°34′38″W	Calistoga	
Schramsberg Vineyards	561	Schramsberg Vineyards	Schramsberg Rd. 38°33′10″N 122°31′53″W	Calistoga	
Veterans Home of California Yountville	828	Veterans Home of California Yountville	California Dr. & Hwy 29; 38°23′39″N 122°21′54″W	Yountville	
Upload Photo	682	York's Cabin	Hwy 29 & Lincoln Ave. 38°34′30″N 122°34′50″W	Calistoga	

== See also ==
- List of California Historical Landmarks
- National Register of Historic Places listings in Napa County, California
