= Calistoga Resiliency Center =

Hydrogen and battery power plant in Calistoga, California

- Country: United States
- Location: Calistoga, California
- Coordinates: 38°34′36″N 122°34′14″W
- Status: Under Construction
- Owner: Energy Vault
- Site area: 0.71 acres

Power generation
- Units operational: 6 Fuel Cell units, 4 BESS units
- Nameplate capacity: 8.5 MW
- Storage capacity: 293 MWh

The Calistoga Resiliency Center is a long-duration energy storage and power generation facility located in Calistoga, California, United States. The facility utilizes a hybrid technology configuration which couples a lithium-ion battery energy storage system (BESS) with a hydrogen fuel cell power plant to produce a combined 8.5 MW of peak power and 293 MWh of total stored energy. When operating under average power demand, the facility is capable of providing up to 48 hours of continuous power to the City of Calistoga. The project utilizes electrolytic green hydrogen compliant with the State of California's Renewable Portfolio Standard. Once fully operational, the project is expected to be the largest green hydrogen long-duration energy storage project in the United States.

The facility is designed to operate primarily as a microgrid, providing backup power to the City of Calistoga during local electrical grid power outage resulting from Public Safety Power Shutoff (PSPS) events organized by regional electrical utility, PG&E. The facility produces no point-source criteria air pollutants or greenhouse gas emissions, a significant factor in the utility's motivation to develop the project.

The Calistoga Resiliency Center is owned and operated by United States energy storage and technology company, Energy Vault. The facility is contracted to supply power to PG&E via a 10.5-year power tolling agreement. The system's ability to provide 48 hours of continuous electrical power results in its characterization as a long-duration energy storage (LDES) project by most industry sources. The United States Department of Energy defines LDES as any energy storage system capable of providing 10 or more hours of electrical power.

== Construction ==
Construction on the project began in February, 2024, with major equipment installation and microgrid construction completed in September, 2024. Final commissioning of the Calistoga Resiliency Center system was ongoing as of May 6th, 2025.

Final delivery of the facility's 234-foot cryogenic hydrogen tank took place in August, 2024 and required escort by the California Highway Patrol as well as several temporary road closures due to its size.

== Technical development ==
The Calistoga Resiliency Center is a hybrid energy storage system pairing four lithium-ion BESS enclosures with six hydrogen fuel cell units. An 80,000 gallon (302,833 liter) onsite cryogenic hydrogen storage tank supplies the fuel cells. Hydrogen is delivered periodically via cryogenic tanker truck to replenish the onsite storage tank. During operation, the system's batteries provide near-instantaneous power output, allowing a few minutes for the fuel cells to reach full power production and thereby relieve the batteries. "Together they work much like a plug-in hybrid vehicle", according to Energy Vault Senior Vice President, Craig Horne, who is helping lead the project. It is the first such facility to provide large-scale grid energy storage in this way, and has been described as a First of a Kind hybrid energy storage project for this reason.

The primary use case of the facility is to operate as an islanding microgrid capable of acting as sole power source for the City of Calistoga during wider electrical grid outage. As such, the project is capable of black start and grid-forming operation, unlike most existing fuel cell power plants. Initial testing and development of the system was conducted by Energy Vault in partnership with the National Renewable Energy Laboratory (NREL) Advanced Research on Integrated Energy Systems (ARIES) program. PG&E verified all at-scale operational results conducted at NREL prior to project groundbreaking in Calistoga, California.

The system is also notable for its capture and utilization of daily hydrogen boil-off, the small quantity of cryogenic liquid hydrogen which vaporizes to gas. Rather than allowing this hydrogen to vent to the atmosphere it is utilized to offset the parasitic load of the system in standby.

The system's BESS units are supplied by Energy Vault, while proton exchange membrane fuel cell units are supplied by United States hydrogen fuel cell manufacturer, Plug Power. The large onsite cryogenic hydrogen storage tank and supporting hydrogen equipment is provided by United States gas equipment manufacturer Chart Industries.

== History ==
The Calistoga Resiliency Center is one of several initiatives undertaken by PG&E and other utilities in response to directives from the California Public Utilities Commission (CPUC) to minimize risk of utility electrical infrastructure inadvertently causing wildfires, among other policy priorities. These actions have come as anthropogenic climate change in California has driven hotter, drier conditions across the state that have resulted in a more frequent and destructive California wildfire season. Historically stretching from June to October of each year, in recent decades California wildfire season has grown longer and more intense.

In response to this increasing fire risk, California investor-owned utility, San Diego Gas & Electric, first received approval from the CPUC in 2012 to preemptively de-energize its electrical infrastructure as a fire-prevention measure. This policy would come to be known as a Public Safety Power Shutoff and was formally extended by the CPUC to fellow large investor-owned utilities, PG&E, and Southern California Edison in 2018.

Despite these and other fire-mitigation efforts, PG&E has been convicted of criminal negligence on several occasions for failure to maintain its electrical distribution and transmission infrastructure determined to have caused destructive California wildfires. Though PG&E was not found to be at fault for the devastating 2017 Tubbs Fire which burned substantial portions of Calistoga, it nevertheless settled those victims' claims as part of a complex $13.5 billion bankruptcy in 2019 stemming from liabilities of that and other fires.

On January 14th, 2021, the California Public Utilities Commission issued Decision 21-01-018 "adopting rates, tariffs, and rules facilitating the commercialization of microgrids", in accordance with California State Senate Bill 1339. The decision affected the three largest electrical investor-owned utilities in California: Pacific Gas & Electric Company, Southern California Edison, and San Diego Gas & Electric. Among the objectives of the decision was to establish electrical microgrids serving communities most vulnerable to PSPS events.

In its March 5th, 2021 Advice Letter 6105-E, PG&E described its imminent 2021 "Temporary Generation Program" supplying backup diesel generators to its electrical substations most likely to be impacted by PSPS events. Calistoga was identified as one of few sites where PG&E had previously developed a microgrid due to the area's high number of PSPS events.

On September 9, 2021, the CPUC further emphasized the requirement that PG&E develop at least one permanent clean substation microgrid in addition to temporary deployments.

On November 30th, 2021 PG&E issued its Clean Substation Microgrid ("CSM") Pilot Request for Offer (RFO).

On December 30th, 2022 PG&E announced Energy Vault as the winning counterparty for the CSM tender. The CPUC approved PG&E's proposal on April 27th, 2023, citing in part the need to replace the temporary diesel generators onsite in Calistoga.
