= Sam Brannan Cottage =

- U.S. National Register of Historic Places
- California Historical Landmark
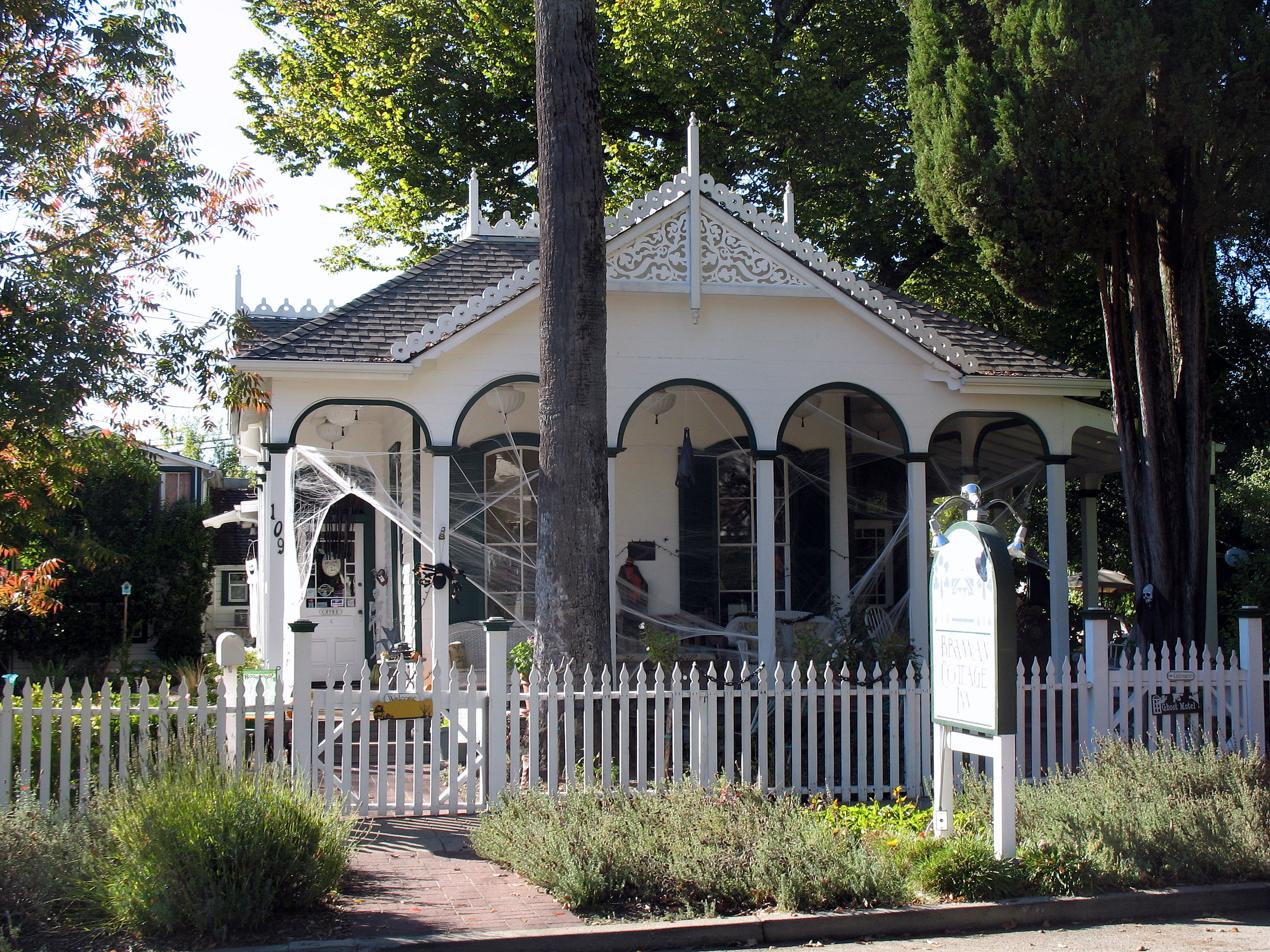

- Location within California
- Location: 109 Wappo Ave., Calistoga, California
- Coordinates: 38°34′56″N 122°34′34″W
- Area: 0.3 acres (0.12 ha)
- Built: 1862
- Architectural style: Classical Revival, Influence
- NRHP reference No.: 83001211
- CHISL No.: 685

Significant dates
- Added to NRHP: August 18, 1983
- Designated CHISL: July 31, 1959

The Sam Brannan Cottage, at 109 Wappo Ave. in Calistoga, California, was built in 1862. It was listed on the National Register of Historic Places in 1983. The listing included four contributing buildings.

It was originally a 22 by 41 feet (6.7 m × 12.5 m) wood-frame building, but has been somewhat modified. Its National Register nomination states that it is:

significant for being the last of the 25 guest cottages of Sam Brannan's Calistoga Hot Springs Resort remaining on its original site, complete with the "weedy palm" as described by Robert Louis Stevenson in the Silverado Squatters. The development of the area's geothermal resource by Brannan was extremely significant to the commercial growth of the 19th Century Napa County and quickly inspired many other such resorts for which the valley became famous and remains so today.

The cottage's architecture utilizes classical elements to convey a feeling of civilization and leisure in the rugged early days of Calistoga in the 1860s. Brannan's selection of this design with gabled roofs and large arch-enclosed porches was enhanced by great attention to the landscaping around the hot springs, including the palm tree planted in front of each cottage. Today, the majority of the now-mature palms tower over the small town, still marking the original location of the cottages.

In 1852, when Sam Brannan first saw "Indian Hot Springs", Calistoga's original name, the area was populated with a few early settlers. In 1859, he purchased the 2,000 acres surrounding the Hot Springs and named it Calistoga from joining the words California and Saratoga (New York's world-famous mineral water spa). By 1862, he opened the resort and Calistoga grew quickly as a result of this service industry and the quicksilver mining nearby. In 1862, the resort, in its prime, boasted such amenities as a large hot springs bath house, an assortment of small bathing pavilions, landscaped parks, a druidical temple built of petrified wood from the nearby Petrified Forest, a roller skating rink, a dance pavilion, a hotel with dining room, an observatory for viewing Napa Valley, and a tree-lined race track with stables where at one time Messrs. Stanford, Lick, Hopkins, and Hearst kept horses.

Twenty-five guest cottages surrounded the Hot Springs Resort. Brannan chose two different designs; the cottage at 109 Wappo is the only remaining example of its type. Two cottages of the other type survive; both have been moved from their original sites.

The cottage is privately owned and operates as part of a hotel called the Brannan Cottage Inn.
