= Energy Vault =

Energy storage technology company

Energy Vault Holdings Inc.
- Type: Public company
- Traded as: NYSE: NRGV
- Industry: Energy Storage
- Founded: 2017
- Founders: Robert Piconi, Bill Gross, Andrea Pedretti
- Headquarters: Thousand Oaks, California
- Key people: Robert Piconi, CEO
- Products: Energy Storage; AI & Datacenter infrastructure; Utility services
- Owners: Public
- Website: energyvault.com

Energy Vault is a global energy infrastructure company delivering power and resilience through three complementary businesses: AI & Data Center Infrastructure, Utility Services, and Energy Storage.

The company is listed on the New York Stock Exchange under the ticker NYSE: NRGV.

== History ==
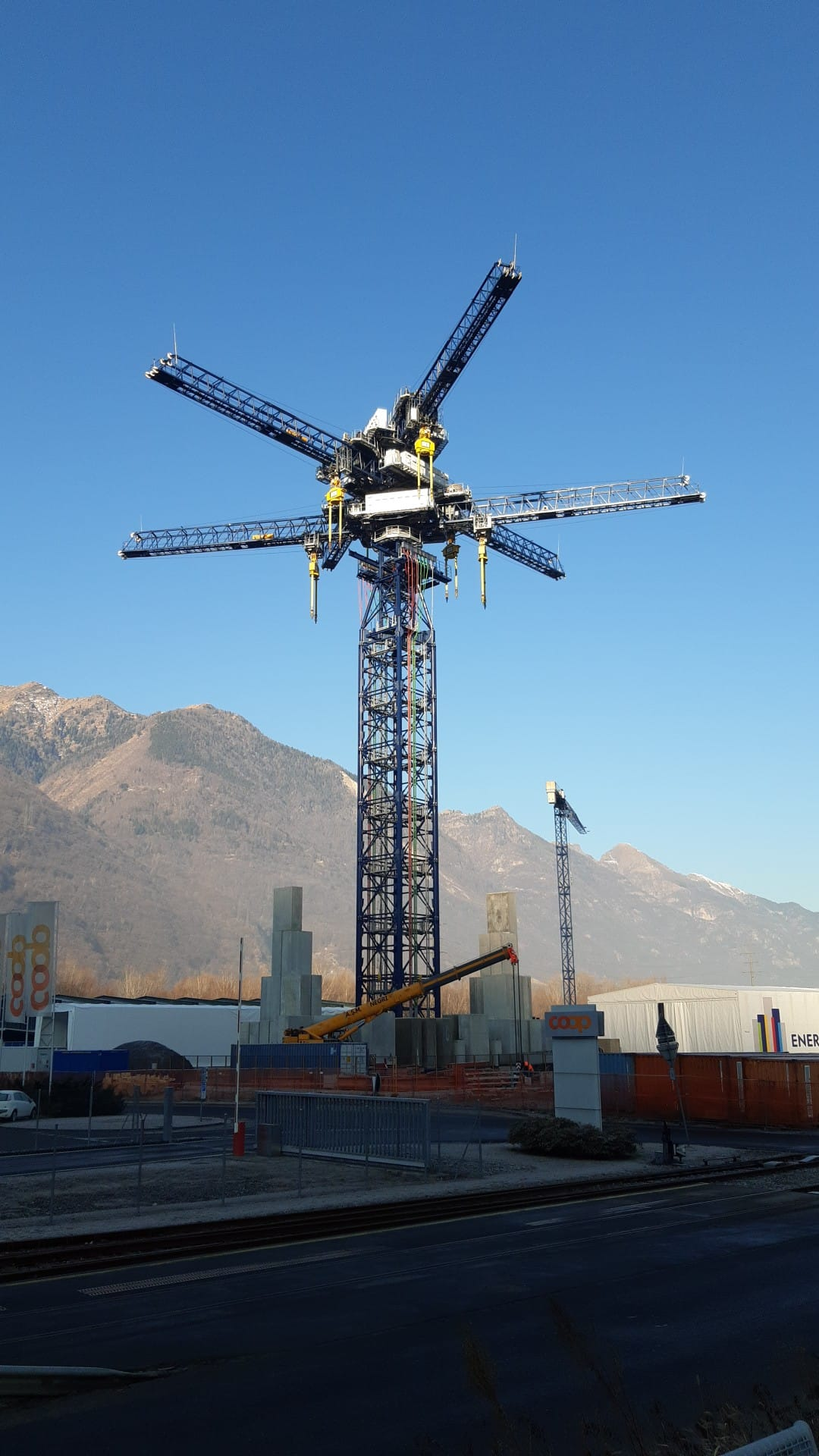
Energy Vault Testing Tower in Castione-Arbedo, January 2022

In 2017, Energy Vault was founded by a group of Swiss engineers in the Idealab startup studio.

In 2019, Energy Vault secured funding from Cemex before going on to secure $110m of Series B funding to become the first energy storage investment of the SoftBank Vision Fund,

In 2020, Energy Vault was Named Technology Pioneer by World Economic Forum and completed the mechanical construction of its testing tower in Castione-Arbedo, Ticino, Switzerland.

In 2021, Energy Vault announced investments from Saudi Aramco Energy, and other existing investors.

In February 2022, Energy Vault Holdings, Inc. began trading on the New York Stock Exchange following the business combination with Novus Capital Corporation II that raised approximately $235 million in gross proceeds additive to $107M and $50M license fees from Atlas Renewable. Atlas renewable being a subsidiary of China Tianying Inc, a company with core activities in energy production from waste processing.

=== Testing tower operation ===
In 2019, construction of a testing tower for the case study EV1 started in Castione-Arbedo, Ticino, Switzerland. It is about 70 m high and each of the 3 double cranes up to 66 m wide. The blocks made of cement with fly ash have a mass of 35 tonnes each. In December 2020 single blocks were raised and lowered 42 m over about 1 minute at 0.7 m/s and the energy drawn from and returned to the national grid recorded. 4.124 kWh electricity was needed to achieve the maximum theoretical potential energy of 3.906 kWh at this height, giving ~95% efficiency for this. On lowering a production of 3.106 kWh was recorded, giving a mean production power of ~186 kW and an efficiency of ~79.5% for this, giving a total round-trip efficiency of ~75%.

==== China ====
The association with Atlas renewable quickly leads to a licensing agreement with Chinese construction companies and local authorities to build a couple of streamlined energy vaults in Rudong (China), next to one of China Tianying's windfarms.

In the summer of 2023, the company announces starting commissioning of its first 25 MW/100 MWh battery in Rudong. A couple of month later, China Tianying announces a planned capacity upgrade up to 3.3GWh.

== Technological diversification ==
As gravitational batteries seems to target very narrow use cases, the company extended its activities to other electricity storage technologies.

==== Electrochemical batteries ====
Energy vault's AI powered storage & demand management software is also being leveraged in the BESS (battery energy storage system) sector through its B-Vault product line, which is proving quite successful in the US and worldwide (According to its 2025Q1 Financial Results, the company also generates revenue from BESS licensing agreements in India and Australia while being implemented through owned / operated sites in the US).

In December 2024, Energy Vault announced a strategic partnership with Rack Scale Data Centers to support the delivery of up to 2 GW of power to data centers.

Another solution bootstrapped by the company is a mixed backup solution combining hydrogen fuel cell and battery powered buffer for frequently off-grided areas, with a prototype installation in Calistoga, California.
