= Calistoga Depot =

Former railway station in California

Calistoga
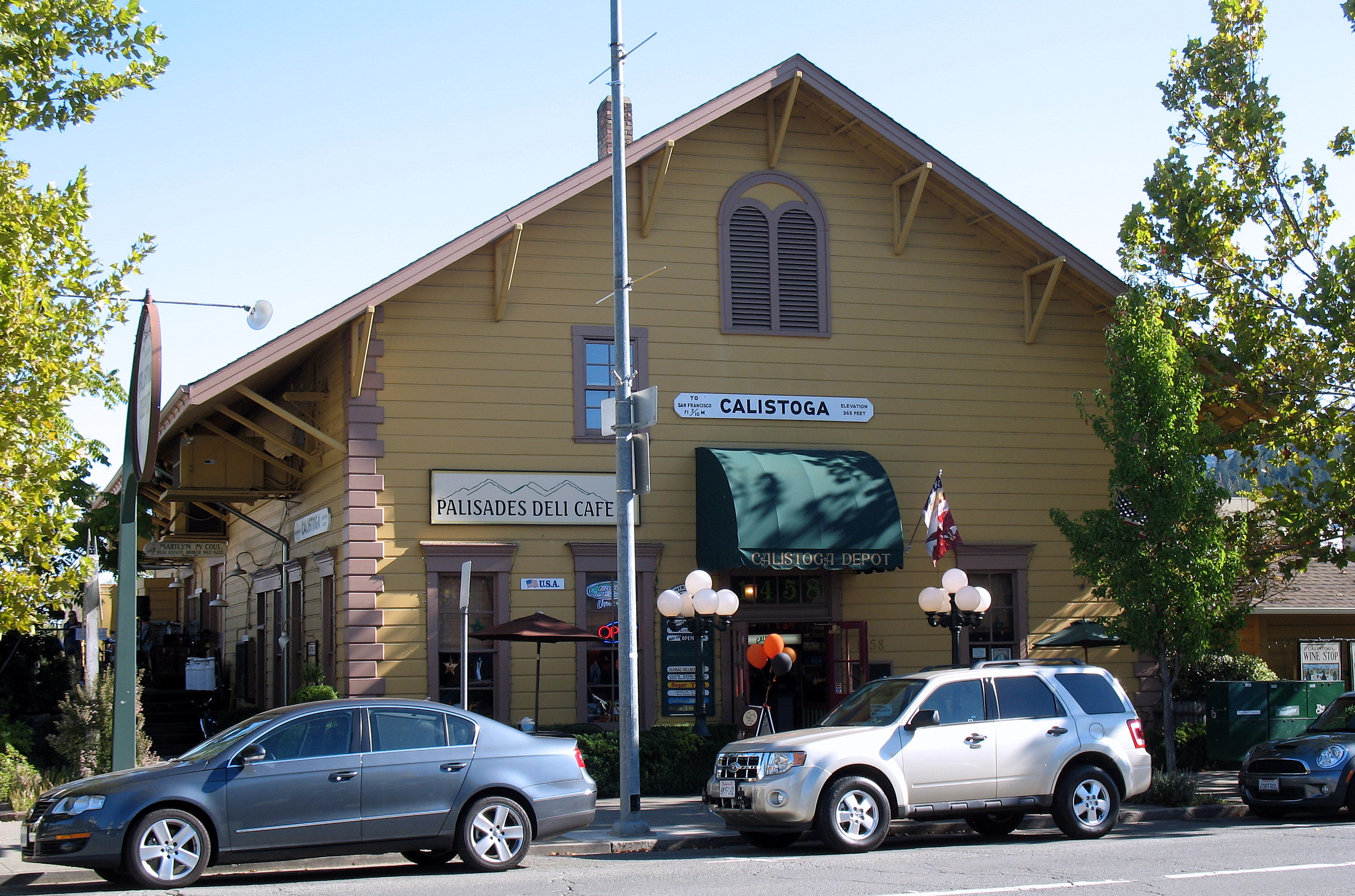
- The former station building in 2011

General information
- Location: 1458 Lincoln Avenue; Calistoga, California
- Owner: Napa Valley Railroad (1868–1885); Southern Pacific Railroad (1885–c. 1978); Mark Navone ( –2017); Merchant family (2017–present)

History
- Opened: October 1868
- Closed: 1929

Services
Preceding station	Southern Pacific Railroad	Following station
Terminus	Calistoga – Vallejo	Larkmead toward Vallejo
- Napa Valley Railroad Depot
- U.S. National Register of Historic Places
- California Historical Landmark
- Coordinates: 38.579778°N 122.578095°W
- Built by: Napa Valley Railroad; Sam Brannan
- NRHP reference No.: 77000313
- CHISL No.: 687
- Added to NRHP: April 18, 1977
Location

Calistoga Depot is a former train station in Calistoga, California.

== History ==
The station building was built in 1868 by Sam Brannan, who intended to bring in tourists to the area by his Napa Valley Railroad – the first passengers arrived that October. Southern Pacific Railroad purchased the line in 1885, and the Depot was folded into their system. Passenger service ended in 1929.

The Depot is registered as a California Historical Landmark on July 31, 1959; it is listed as number 687. It was additionally listed on the National Register of Historic Places on April 18, 1977, as Napa Valley Railroad Depot.

The building was restored in 1978 by Calistoga Depot Associates. That year, Central Pacific Coach No. 12 was moved to the depot to act as tenant space, housing a wine shop for over 30 years. The car was moved to the California State Railroad Museum in 2020 for restoration.

In 2017, the property was purchased by the Merchant family, owners of the nearby Indian Springs Resort and Spa.

== Design ==
The building was painted white in 2020; it had previously been Colonial yellow since 1906.
