= Calistoga Spa Hot Springs =

Geothermal spring system and resort in California, US

Coordinates: 38.57915°N 122.57707°W

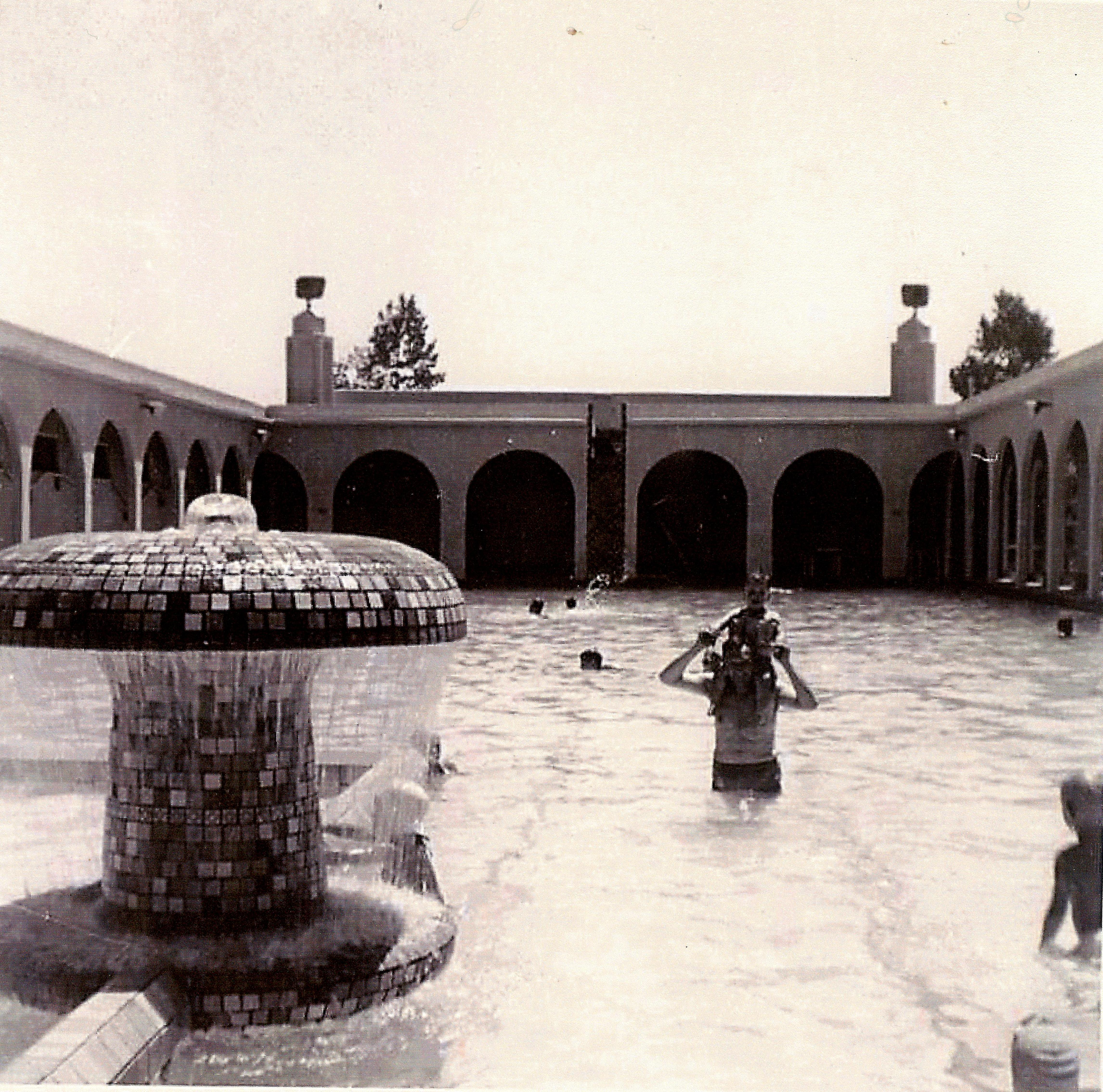
- Original Roman Pool at Calistoga hot springs
- Industry: Hospitality
- Headquarters: Calistoga, California, United States
- Services: Hotels, Resorts, Spa
- Website: calistogaspa.com

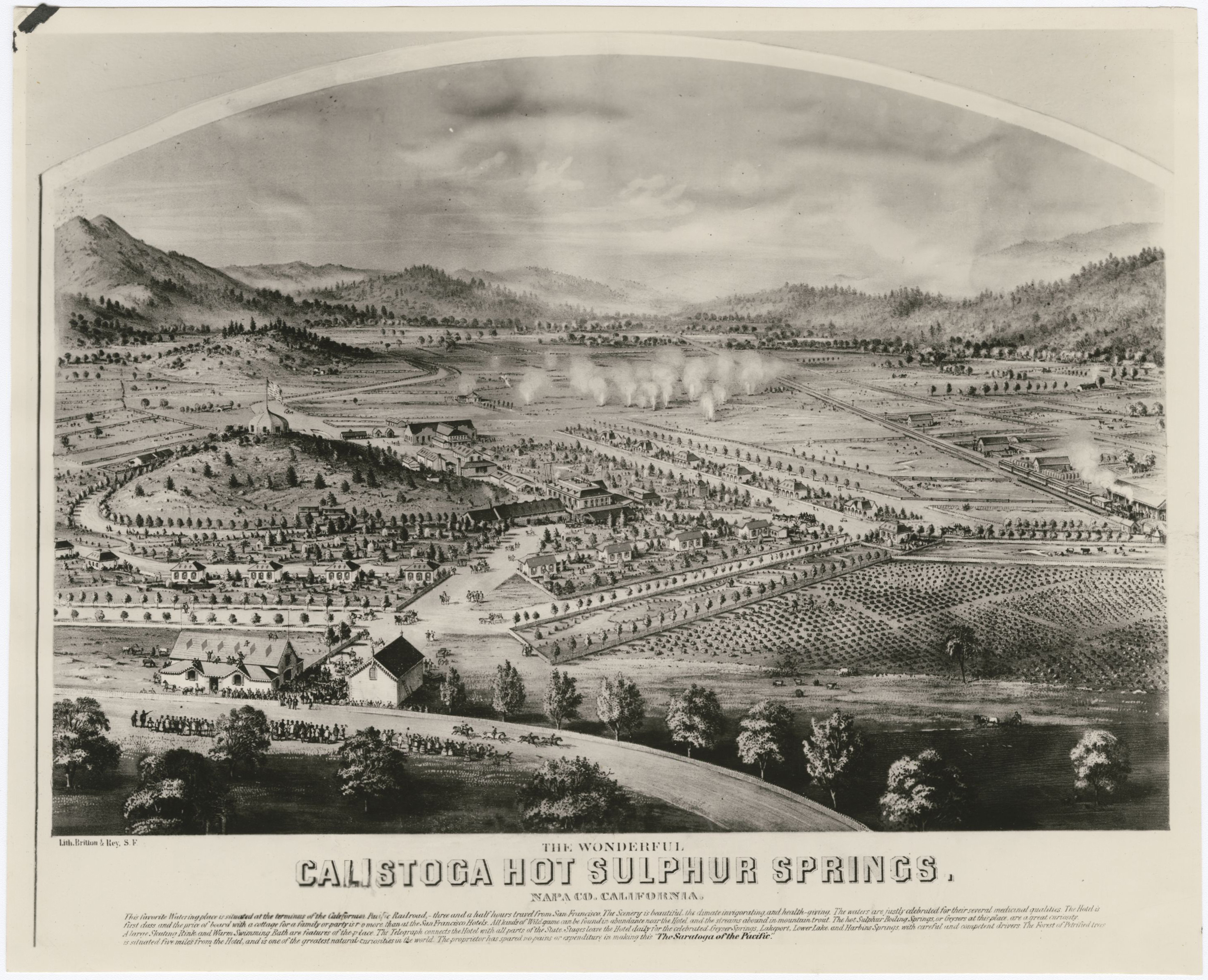
Calistoga Sulphur Hot Springs around 1890

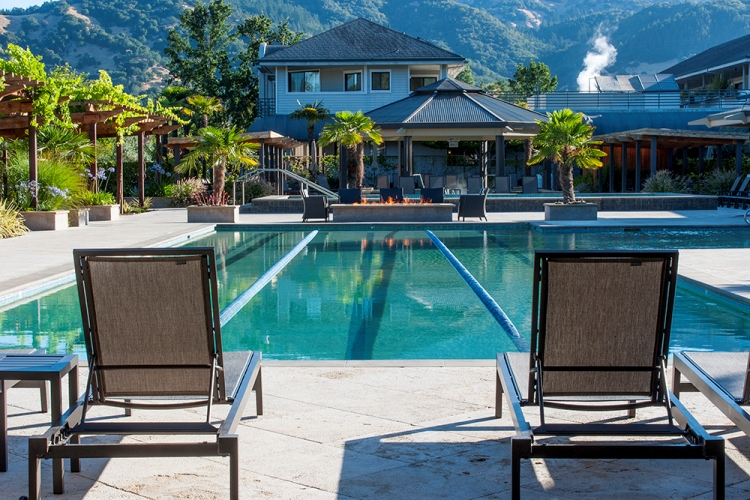
Calistoga Spa Hot Springs Pool in 2013

Calistoga Spa Hot Springs, formerly known as Calistoga Hot Sulfur Springs, is a geothermal spring system and resort located in the upper Napa Valley town of Calistoga, California. The resort has been continuously operated as a hot spring resort since the early 1900s.

== History ==
The indigenous Wappo civilization occupied the region for thousands of years and annually migrated to the upper valley to village near the exposed mineral pools found along the western ridge of the Mayacamas mountain range. Geothermal forces and tectonic activity elevate the temperature of the mineral water to 180 degrees Fahrenheit at the source.

From 1965 through 1986 the resort property operated Calistoga's largest open to the public pool, the Roman Pool. Through use and age the pool fell into decline and was closed in 1985. Between 1965 and 1985 the number of guest rooms increased. In 1986 a new main spa building was constructed to replace the Roman along with a mud bath and mineral bath facility.

Further expansion took place in 2014.
