= FOAK =

FOAK is an acronym for First of a Kind. It is used in engineering economics where the first item or generation of items using a new technology or design can cost significantly more than later items or generations, which are called NOAK an acronym for nth of a kind.

== See also ==
- Learning curve
