= Calistoga, California =

City in California, United States

- City
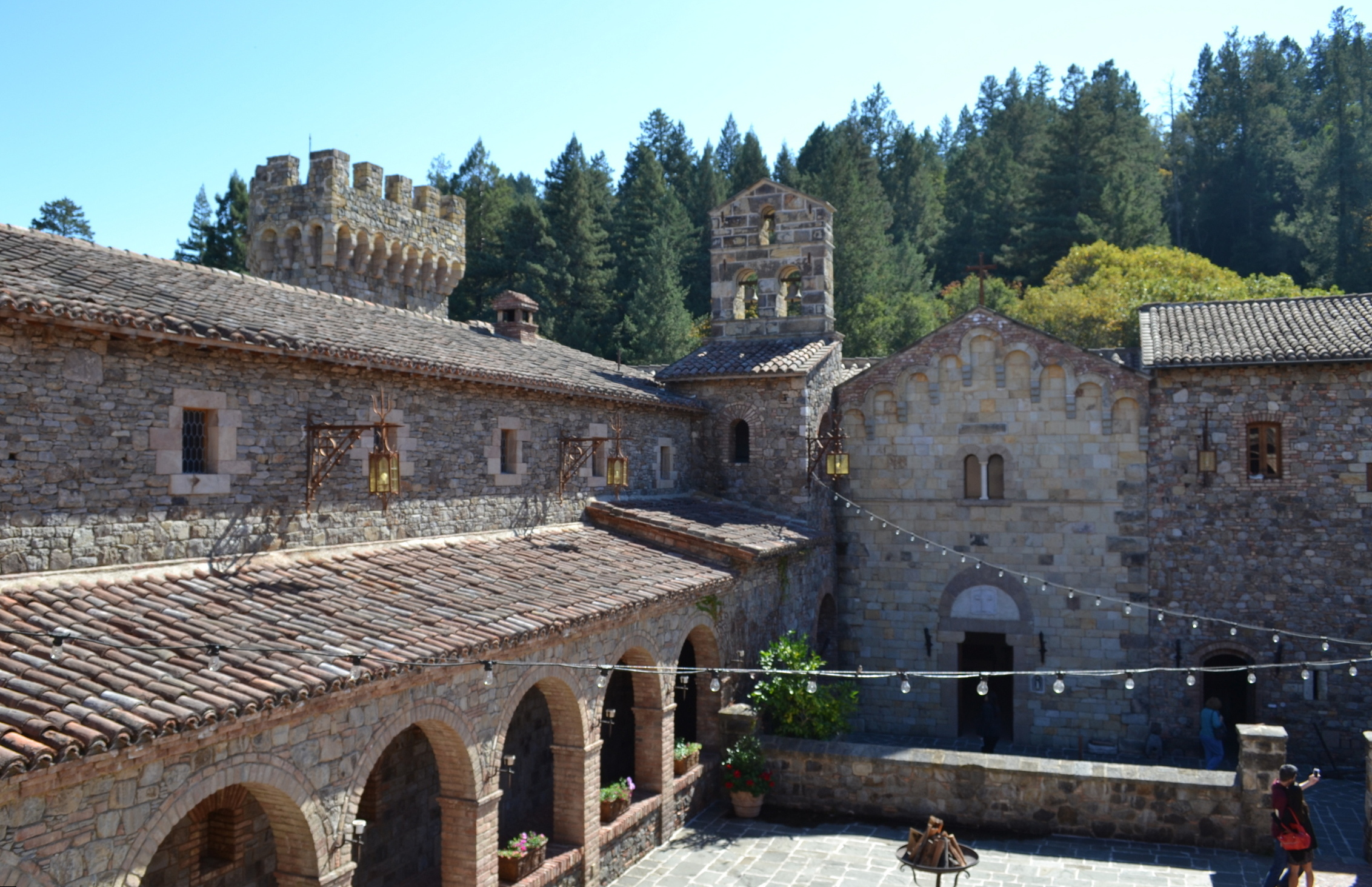
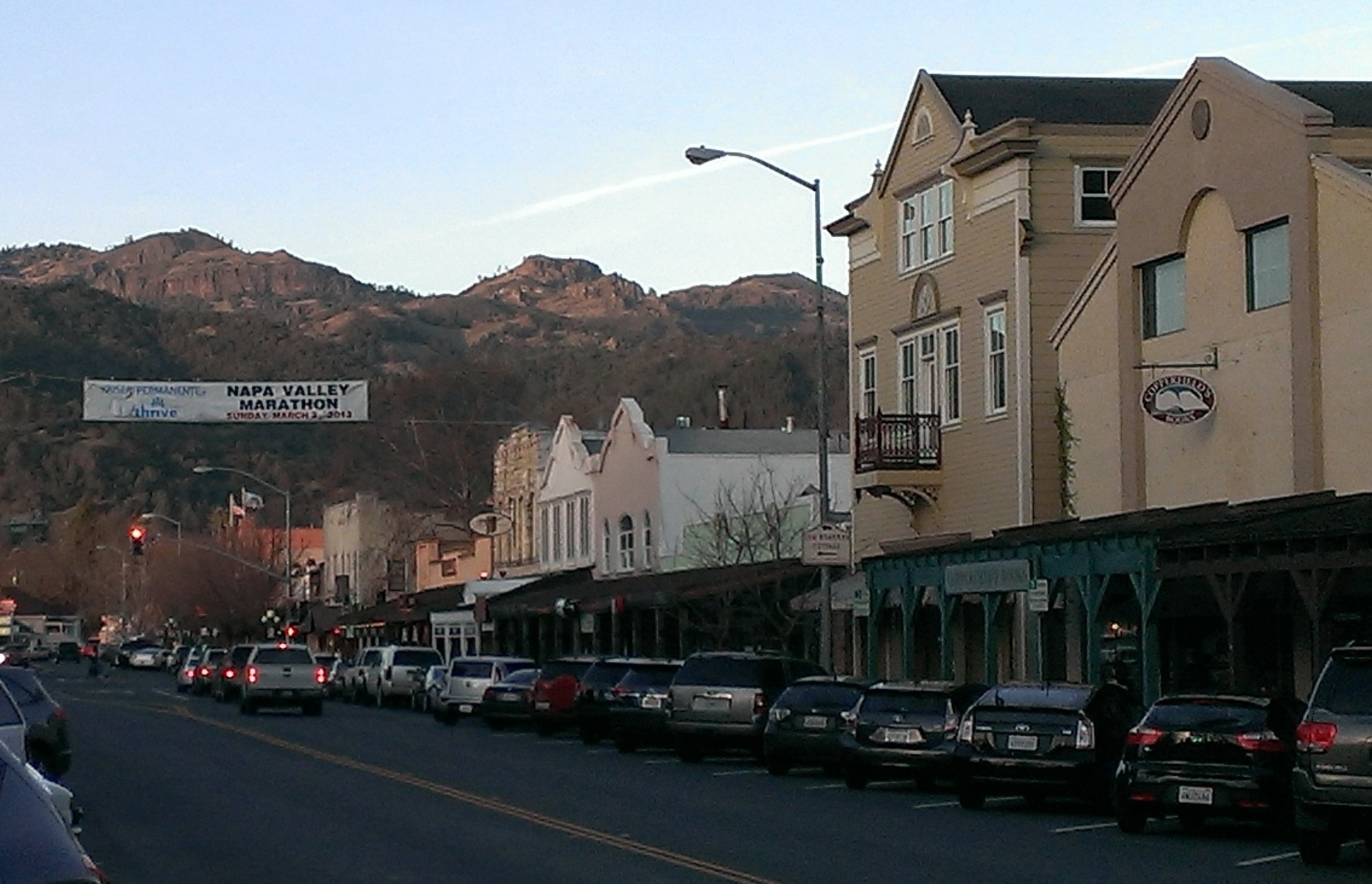
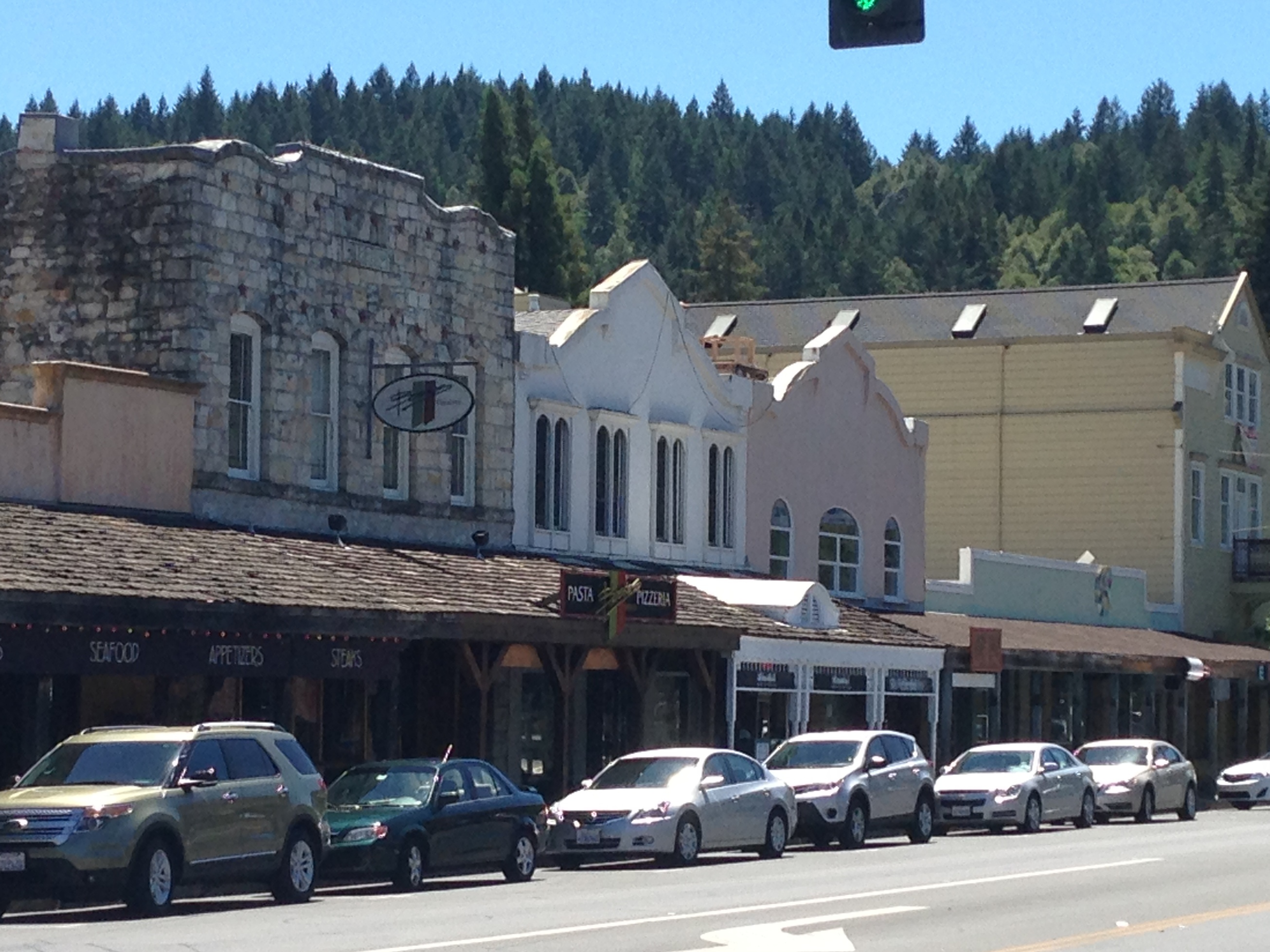
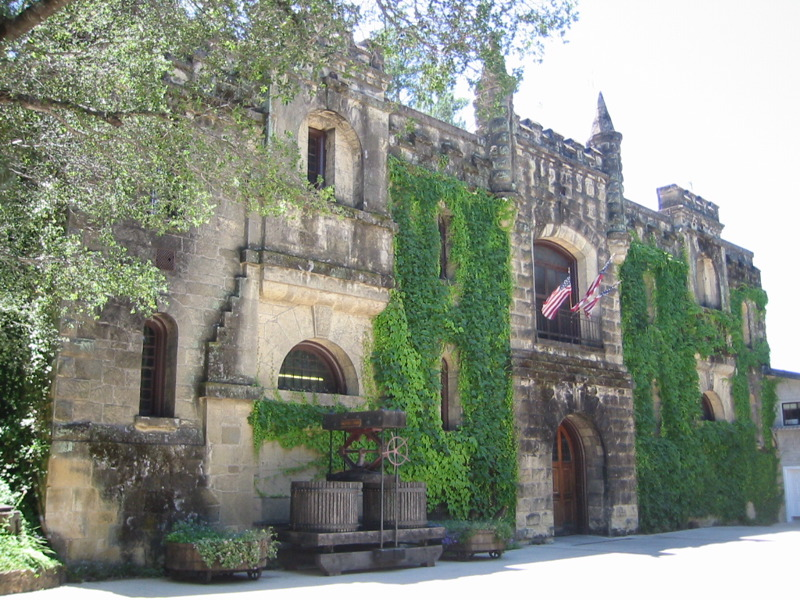
- Clockwise from top left: Castello di Amorosa; downtown Calistoga; Chateau Montelena; downtown Calistoga

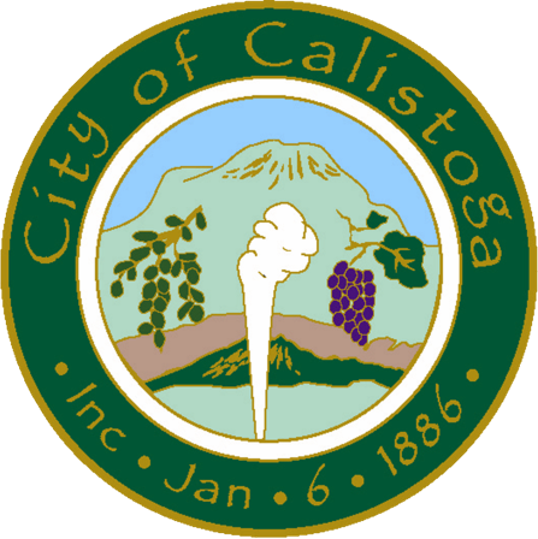
- Seal
- Interactive map of Calistoga, California
- Coordinates: 38°34′53″N 122°34′58″W
- Country: United States
- State: California
- County: Napa
- Incorporated: January 6, 1886

Government
  - Mayor: Donald Williams

Area
  - Total: 2.59 sq mi (6.72 km^{2})
  - Land: 2.58 sq mi (6.67 km^{2})
  - Water: 0.019 sq mi (0.05 km^{2}) 0.70%
- Elevation: 348 ft (106 m)

Population (2020)
  - Total: 5,228
  - Density: 2,028.9/sq mi (783.36/km^{2})
- Time zone: UTC-8 (Pacific)
  - Summer (DST): UTC-7 (Pacific)
- ZIP code: 94515
- Area code: 707
- FIPS code: 06-09892
- GNIS feature IDs: 277482, 2409963
- Website: calistogaca.gov

Calistoga is a city in Napa County, California, United States. Located in the North Bay region of the San Francisco Bay Area, the city had a population of 5,228 as of the 2020 census.

Calistoga was founded in 1868 when the California Pacific Railroad was built, establishing the town as a tourist destination for its Calistoga Hot Springs. Today, Calistoga continues as a popular tourist destination in Wine Country, owing to its vineyards and historic landmarks.

== History ==
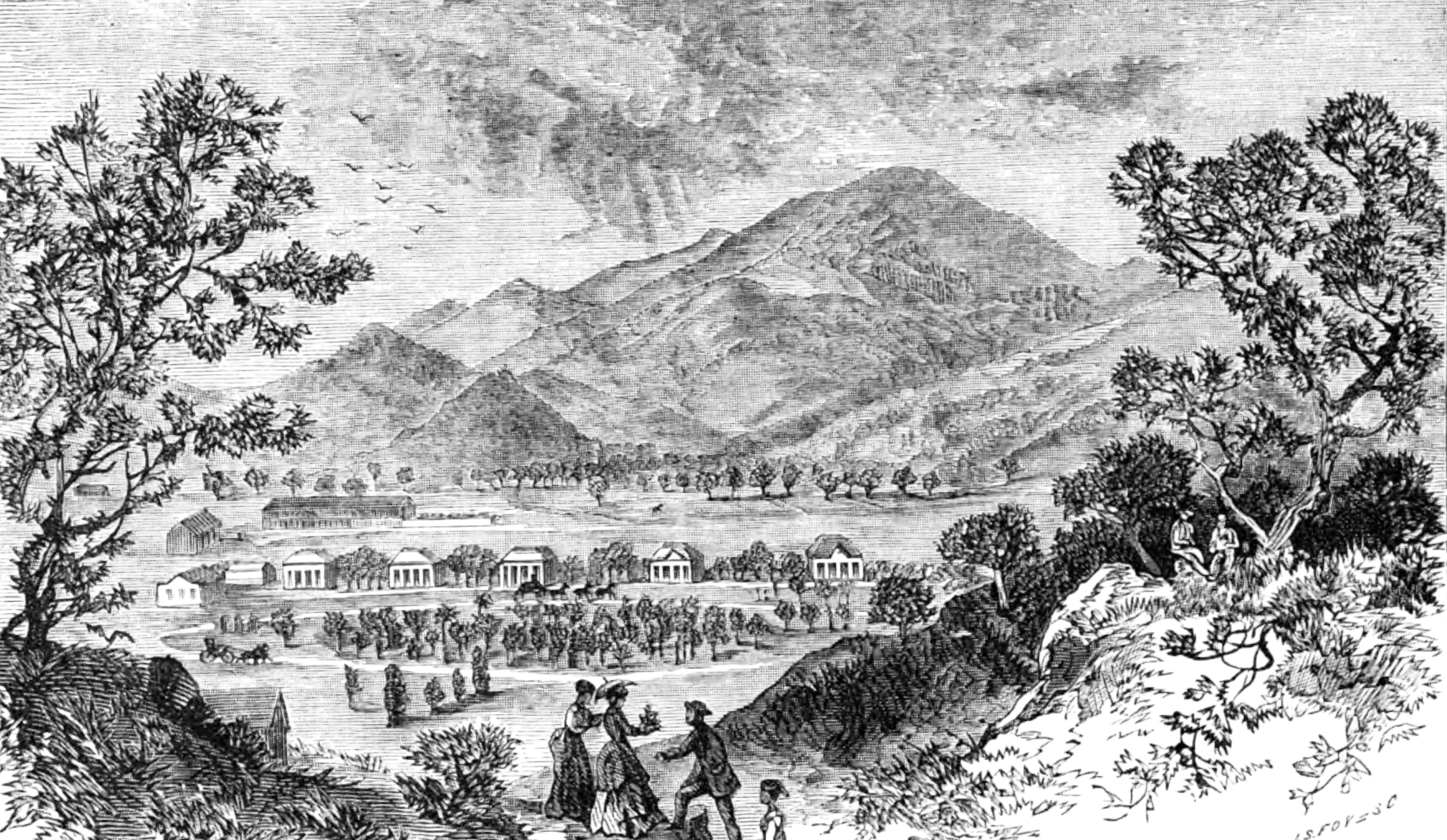
Calistoga Hot Springs in 1873

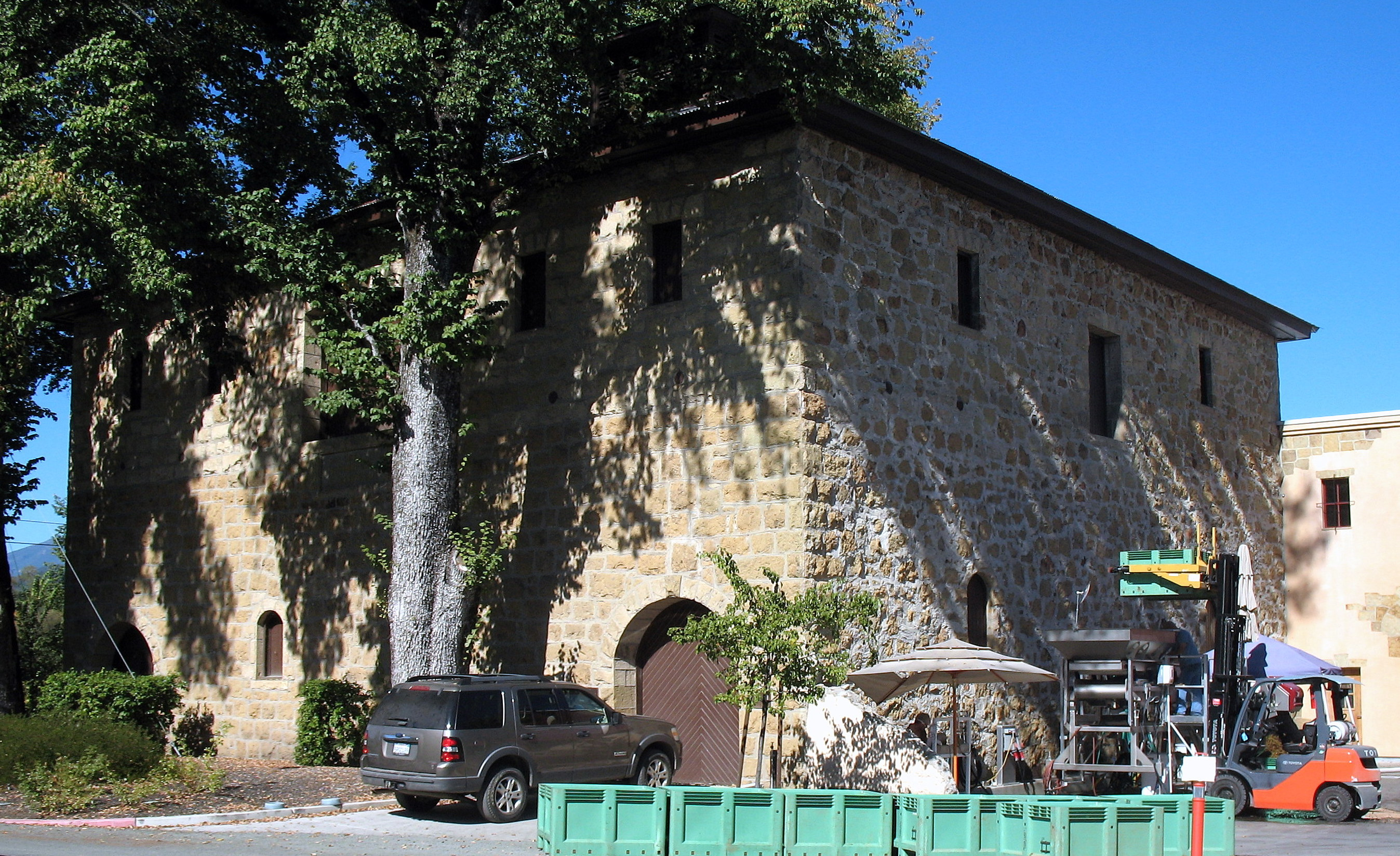
Larkmead Winery, built 1884

The Upper Napa Valley was once the home of a significant population of Indigenous People, called the Wappo, during the Spanish colonial era of the late 18th century. With abundant oak trees providing acorns as a food staple and the natural hot springs as a healing ground Calistoga (Wappo: Nilektsonoma, meaning "Chicken Hawk Place") was the site of several villages. Following Mexican Independence, mission properties were secularized and disposed of by the Mexican government with much of the Napa Valley being partitioned into large ranchos in the 1830s and 1840s. The first Anglo settlers began arriving in the 1840s, with several taking up lands in the Calistoga area.

Samuel Brannan was the leader of a Mormon settlement expedition on the ship Brooklyn landing in Yerba Buena (San Francisco) in 1846. He published San Francisco's first English-language newspaper, the California Star. Following the discovery of gold in Coloma, Brannan became California's first millionaire. Fascinated by Calistoga's natural hot springs, Brannan purchased more than 2,000 acres (3 sq mi) with the intent to develop a spa reminiscent of Saratoga Springs in New York.

The name of Calistoga was given to the place in the fall of 1867, by Mr. Brannan, who has been reported and quoted as saying that the name came from a slip of the tongue that transformed "Saratoga of California" into "Calistoga of Sarafornia". The place had already been previously called Hot Springs by the few Americans, and Agua Caliente by the Spaniards and Indians.

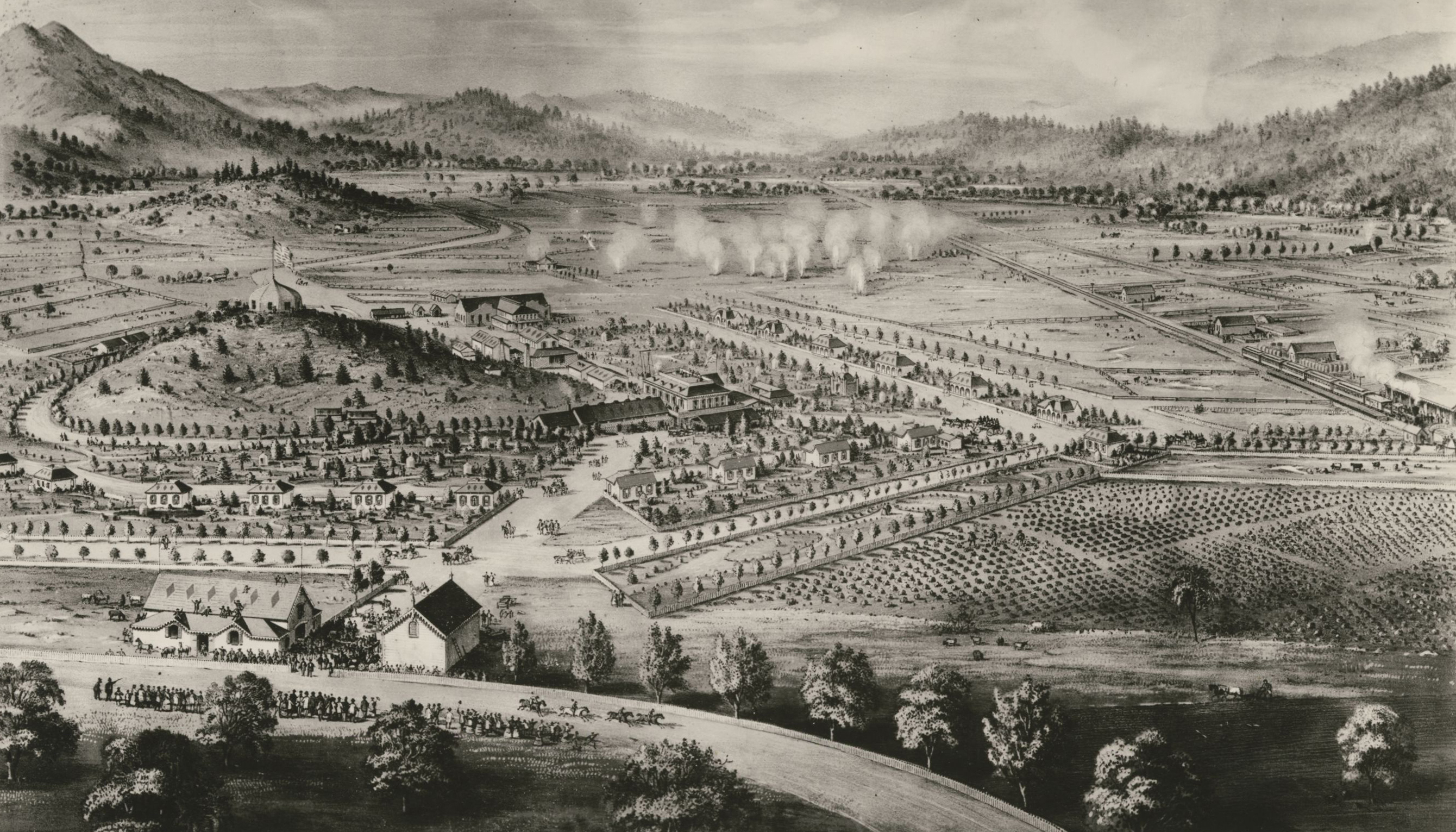
View of Calistoga, c. 1890

Brannan's Hot Springs Resort surrounding Mt. Lincoln with the Spa/Hotel located at what is now Indian Springs Resort and Brannan Cottage Inn, opened to California's rich and famous in 1862. The Napa Valley Railroad Company's track was completed to Calistoga in 1868, providing an easier connection for ferry passengers traveling from San Francisco, as well as transforming Calistoga into a transportation hub for the upper Napa Valley and a gateway to Lake and Sonoma Counties.

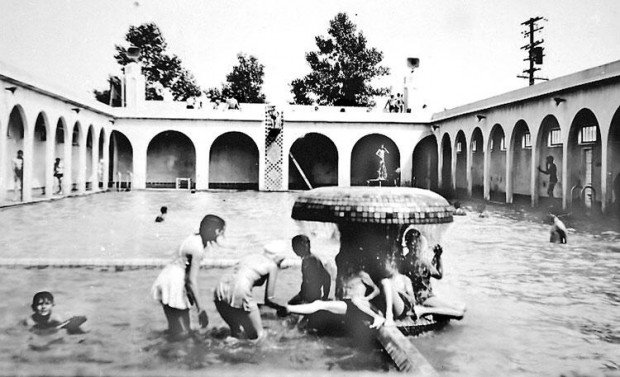
The Calistoga Hot Springs, c. 1940

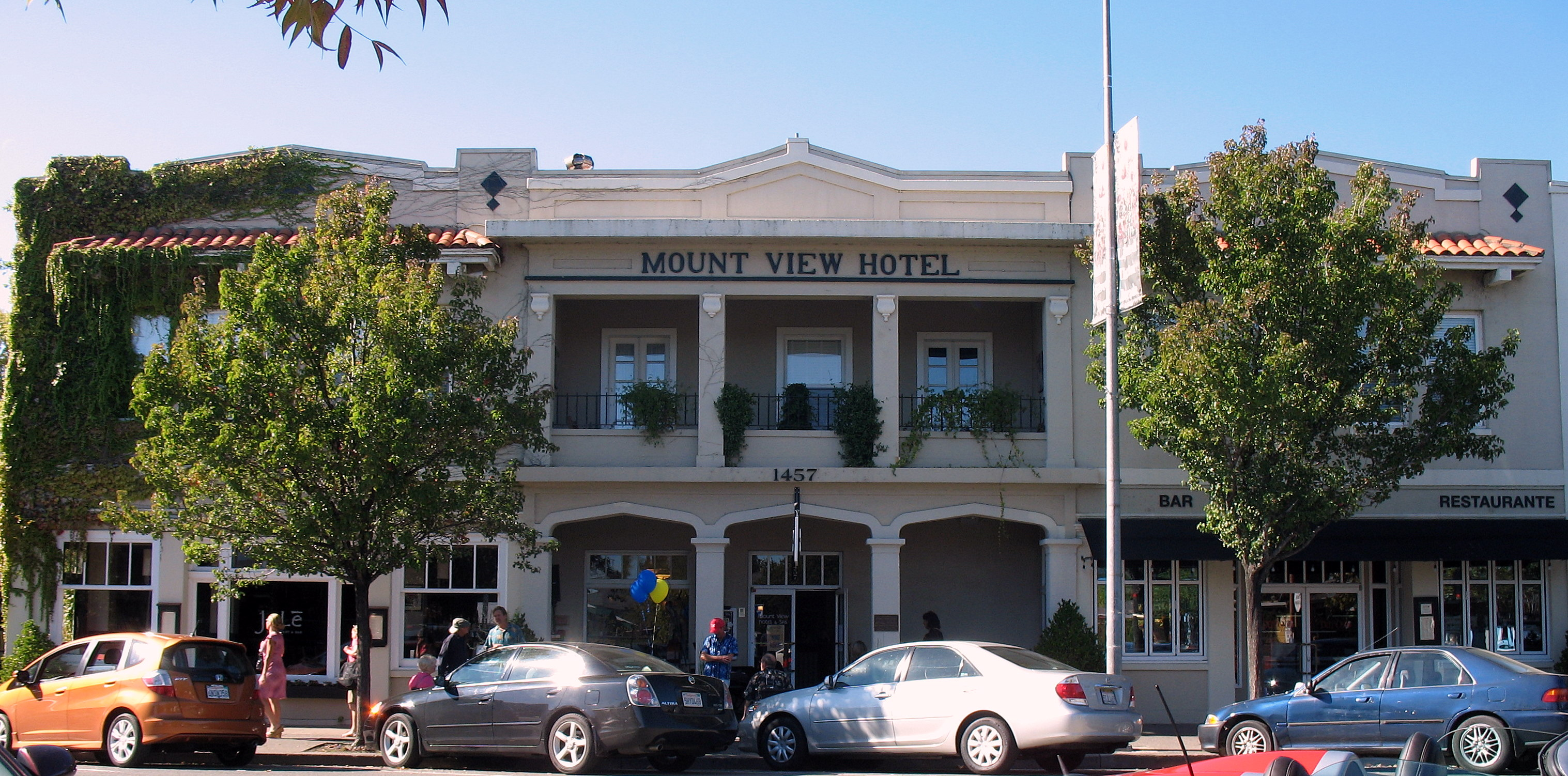
The Mount View Hotel, built 1918

Calistoga's economy was based on mining (silver and mercury) agriculture (grapes, prunes and walnuts) and tourism (the hot springs). One of the early visitors was Robert Louis Stevenson, who wrote the Silverado Squatters while honeymooning with his wife Fanny Vandegrift at a cabin near Silverado Mine on Mount Saint Helena.

In 1920, Giuseppe Musante, a soda fountain and candy store owner in Calistoga, was drilling for a cold water well at the Railway Exchange when he tapped into a hot water source. In 1924 he set up a bottling line and began selling Calistoga Sparkling Mineral Water. The company became a major player in the bottled water business after Elwood Sprenger bought the small bottling plant in 1970 known today as Calistoga Water Company.

Calistoga was named a Distinctive Destination by the National Trust for Historic Preservation in 2001.

In 2017, the Tubbs Fire, which killed at least 19 people, started off Highway 128 and Bennett Lane in Calistoga. The fire led to the evacuation of almost the entire population of Calistoga. The 2017 Tubbs Fire took exactly the same path as the 1964 Hanly Fire. In 2020, the Glass Fire forced an evacuation of the city for the second time in four years. Since then, PG&E has several times pre-emptively cut electrical power to Calistoga in dangerous weather conditions to prevent its power lines from sparking a wildfire. In 2024, the utility funded the construction of the Calistoga Resiliency Center, a backup electricity generation facility (microgrid) equipped with six hydrogen fuel cells that will be able to provide power to the city for at least 48 hours.

== Geography ==
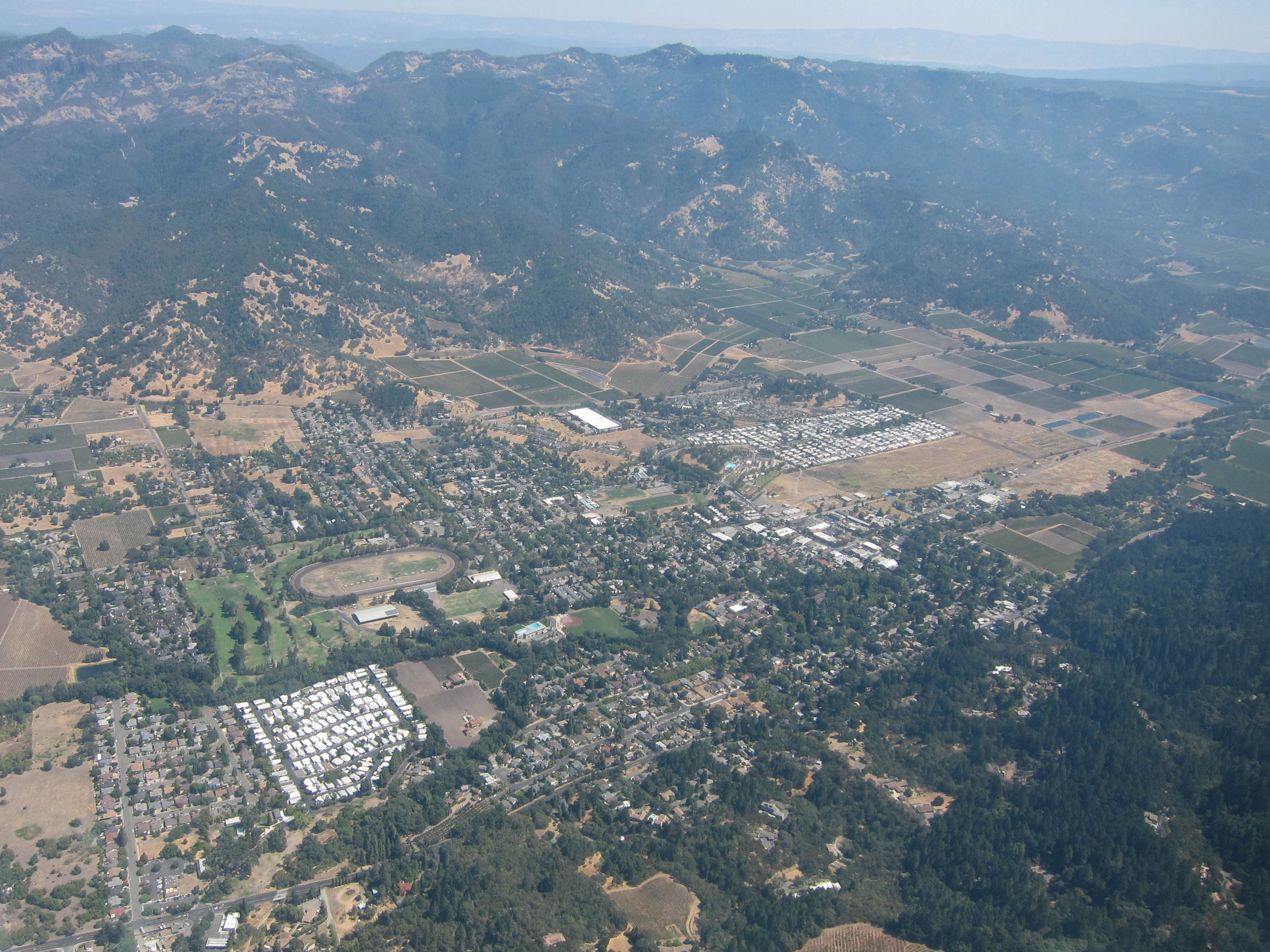
Aerial view of Calistoga

According to the United States Census Bureau, the city has a total area of 2.6 square miles (6.7 km^{2}), of which 99.30% is land and 0.70% is water.

=== Climate ===
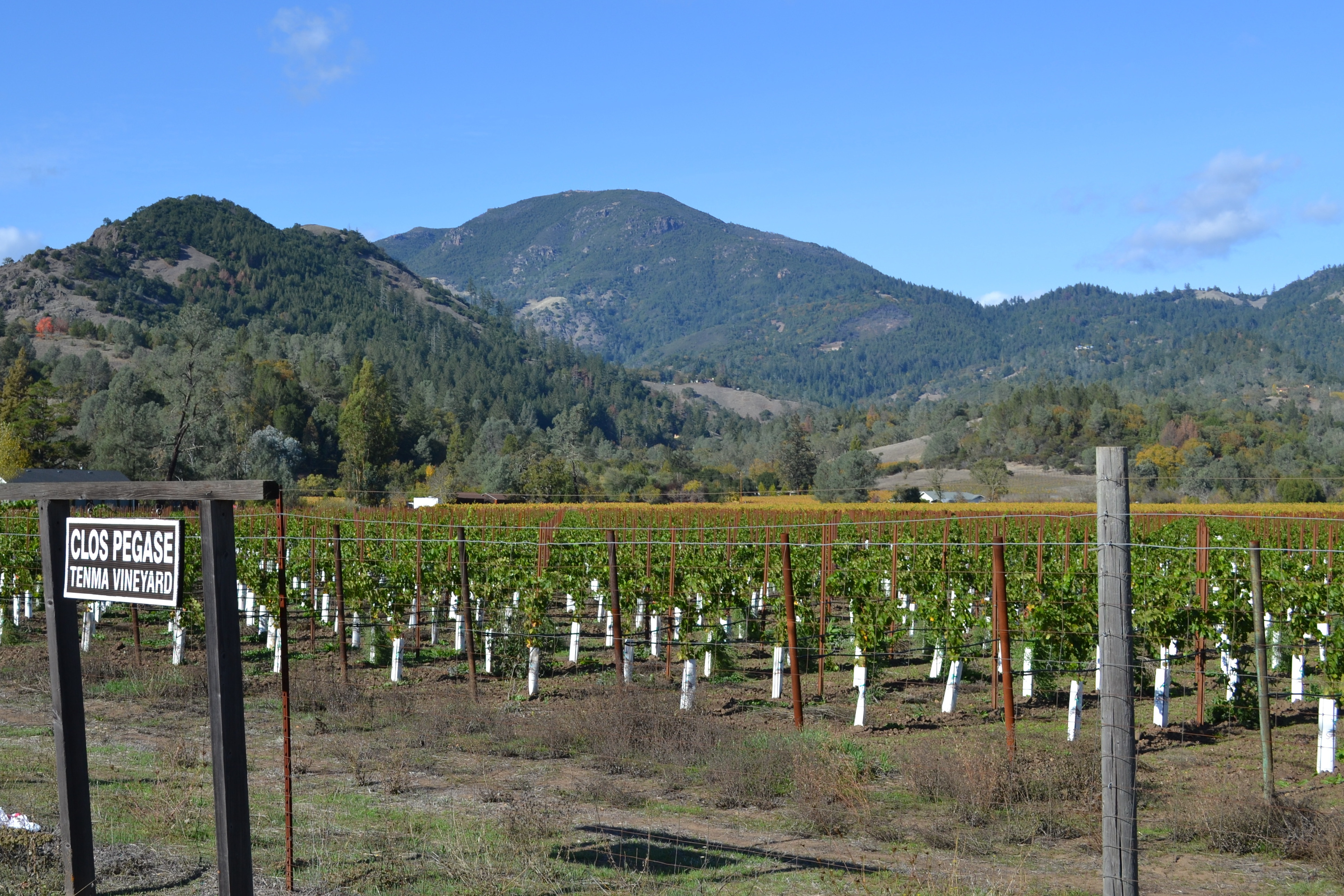
View of Mount Saint Helena

According to National Weather Service records, Calistoga has cool, wet winters with temperatures dropping to freezing on an average of 35.6 days. Summers are usually very dry, with daytime temperatures regularly reaching 90 °F (32 °C) or higher on an average of 70.8 days, but nights are cool, dropping into the mid-fifties. Average January temperatures range from 58.8 to 39.4 °F (14.9 to 4.1 °C). Average July temperatures range from 89.5 to 54.7 °F (31.9 to 12.6 °C). The record high temperature of 118 °F (47.8 °C) occurred on September 6, 2022. The record low temperature of 10 °F (−12.2 °C) was recorded on December 11, 1932. Calistoga has a hot-summer Mediterranean climate (Csa) according to the Köppen climate classification system.

Average annual rainfall is 38.58 inches (980 mm) with measurable precipitation falling on an average of 65.7 days each year. The wettest year was 1983 with 75.38 inches (1,915 mm) and the driest year was 2013 with 6.45 inches (164 mm). The most rainfall in one month was 32.06 inches (814 mm) in February 1986. The most rainfall in 24 hours was 8.10 inches (206 mm) on February 17, 1986. Snow often falls in the nearby mountains during the winter months, but is rare in Calistoga. On January 3, 1974, 3.0 inches (7.6 cm) of snow fell in the city.

Climate data for Calistoga, California, 1991–2020 normals, extremes 1916–present
Month	Jan	Feb	Mar	Apr	May	Jun	Jul	Aug	Sep	Oct	Nov	Dec	Year
Record high °F (°C)	84 (29)	88 (31)	90 (32)	102 (39)	104 (40)	108 (42)	114 (46)	111 (44)	118 (48)	106 (41)	96 (36)	87 (31)	118 (48)
Mean maximum °F (°C)	72.4 (22.4)	76.4 (24.7)	81.2 (27.3)	87.6 (30.9)	92.9 (33.8)	101.3 (38.5)	102.8 (39.3)	102.6 (39.2)	101.9 (38.8)	94.2 (34.6)	81.6 (27.6)	71.4 (21.9)	106.0 (41.1)
Mean daily maximum °F (°C)	58.8 (14.9)	61.7 (16.5)	65.7 (18.7)	70.3 (21.3)	76.5 (24.7)	84.5 (29.2)	89.5 (31.9)	89.1 (31.7)	87.4 (30.8)	78.6 (25.9)	65.9 (18.8)	57.7 (14.3)	73.8 (23.2)
Daily mean °F (°C)	49.1 (9.5)	51.4 (10.8)	54.2 (12.3)	57.3 (14.1)	62.5 (16.9)	68.6 (20.3)	72.1 (22.3)	71.7 (22.1)	69.8 (21.0)	63.0 (17.2)	53.8 (12.1)	48.1 (8.9)	60.1 (15.6)
Mean daily minimum °F (°C)	39.4 (4.1)	41.1 (5.1)	42.8 (6.0)	44.3 (6.8)	48.5 (9.2)	52.7 (11.5)	54.7 (12.6)	54.3 (12.4)	52.2 (11.2)	47.4 (8.6)	41.7 (5.4)	38.5 (3.6)	46.5 (8.0)
Mean minimum °F (°C)	26.9 (−2.8)	28.5 (−1.9)	31.1 (−0.5)	33.6 (0.9)	38.0 (3.3)	41.9 (5.5)	45.6 (7.6)	45.9 (7.7)	42.6 (5.9)	35.4 (1.9)	29.4 (−1.4)	25.5 (−3.6)	23.1 (−4.9)
Record low °F (°C)	17 (−8)	17 (−8)	19 (−7)	20 (−7)	18 (−8)	32 (0)	32 (0)	38 (3)	32 (0)	27 (−3)	21 (−6)	10 (−12)	10 (−12)
Average precipitation inches (mm)	7.94 (202)	7.07 (180)	5.89 (150)	2.32 (59)	1.37 (35)	0.29 (7.4)	0.01 (0.25)	0.03 (0.76)	0.12 (3.0)	1.83 (46)	3.76 (96)	7.95 (202)	38.58 (981.41)
Average precipitation days (≥ 0.01 in)	11.6	11.1	8.7	6.3	3.7	1.1	0.1	0.1	0.7	3.6	6.3	12.4	65.7
Source 1: NOAA
Source 2: National Weather Service

== Demographics ==
Historical population
Census	Pop.	Note	%±
1880	407		—
1900	690		—
1910	751		8.8%
1920	850		13.2%
1930	1,000		17.6%
1940	1,124		12.4%
1950	1,418		26.2%
1960	1,514		6.8%
1970	1,882		24.3%
1980	3,879		106.1%
1990	4,468		15.2%
2000	5,190		16.2%
2010	5,155		−0.7%
2020	5,228		1.4%
U.S. Decennial Census

=== 2020 census ===
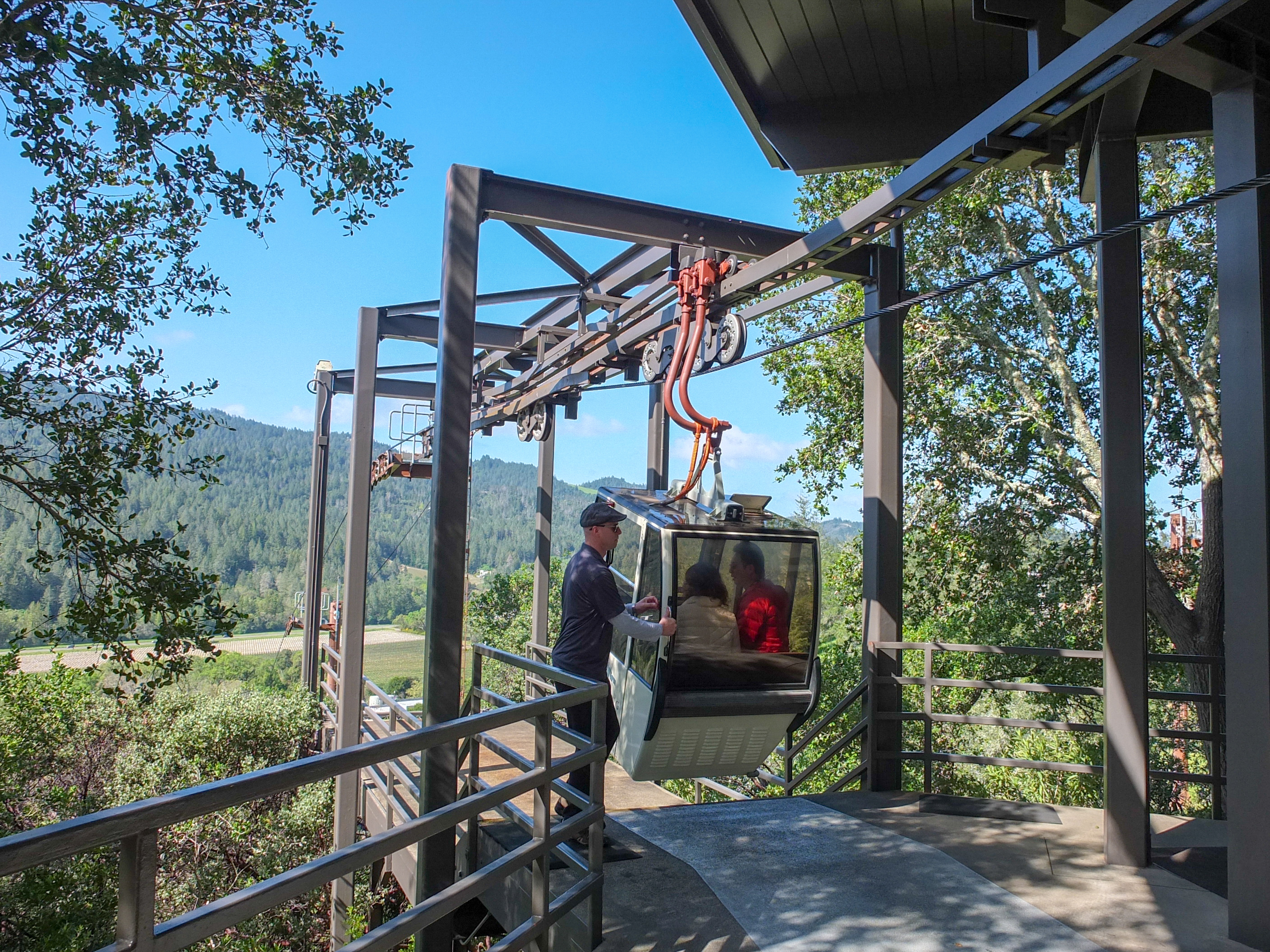
Gondola lift at Sterling Vineyards

As of the 2020 census, Calistoga had a population of 5,228. The population density was 2,028.7 inhabitants per square mile (783.3/km^{2}), and the median age was 44.8 years. The age distribution was 21.2% under the age of 18, 6.6% aged 18 to 24, 22.5% aged 25 to 44, 25.7% aged 45 to 64, and 24.0% aged 65 or older. For every 100 females there were 91.7 males, and for every 100 females age 18 and over there were 88.0 males age 18 and over.

The census reported that 99.7% of the population lived in households, 0.3% lived in non-institutionalized group quarters, and no one was institutionalized. Calistoga was 98.9% urban and 1.1% rural.

There were 2,108 households, of which 29.3% had children under the age of 18 living in them. Of all households, 45.6% were married-couple households, 6.6% were cohabiting-couple households, 31.3% had a female householder with no spouse or partner present, and 16.5% had a male householder with no spouse or partner present. About 30.4% of households were made up of individuals, and 19.1% had someone living alone who was 65 years of age or older. The average household size was 2.47, and there were 1,313 families (62.3% of all households).

There were 2,392 housing units at an average density of 928.2 units per square mile (358.4 units/km^{2}), of which 2,108 (88.1%) were occupied. Of the occupied units, 54.8% were owner-occupied and 45.2% were renter-occupied. The homeowner vacancy rate was 2.7% and the rental vacancy rate was 4.6%.

Racial composition as of the 2020 census
Race	Number	Percent
White	2,550	48.8%
Black or African American	26	0.5%
American Indian and Alaska Native	84	1.6%
Asian	88	1.7%
Native Hawaiian and Other Pacific Islander	3	0.1%
Some other race	1,420	27.2%
Two or more races	1,057	20.2%
Hispanic or Latino (of any race)	2,698	51.6%

=== Income and poverty ===
In 2023, the US Census Bureau estimated that the median household income was $84,892, and the per capita income was $60,684. About 6.9% of families and 7.3% of the population were below the poverty line.

=== 2010 census ===
The historic Garnett Creek stone bridge, built in 1902

At the 2010 census Calistoga had a population of 5,155. The population density was 1,972.4 inhabitants per square mile (761.5/km^{2}). The racial makeup of Calistoga was 3,735 (72.5%) White, 27 (0.5%) African American, 21 (0.4%) Native American, 47 (0.9%) Asian, 10 (0.2%) Pacific Islander, 968 (18.8%) from other races, and 347 (6.7%) from two or more races. Hispanic or Latino of any race were 2,545 persons (49.4%).

The census reported that 5,100 people (98.9% of the population) lived in households, 20 (0.4%) lived in non-institutionalized group quarters, and 35 (0.7%) were institutionalized.

There were 2,019 households, 630 (31.2%) had children under the age of 18 living in them, 927 (45.9%) were opposite-sex married couples living together, 189 (9.4%) had a female householder with no husband present, 99 (4.9%) had a male householder with no wife present. There were 141 (7.0%) unmarried opposite-sex partnerships, and 20 (1.0%) same-sex married couples or partnerships. 641 households (31.7%) were one person and 332 (16.4%) had someone living alone who was 65 or older. The average household size was 2.53. There were 1,215 families (60.2% of households); the average family size was 3.23.

The age distribution was 1,167 people (22.6%) under the age of 18, 400 people (7.8%) aged 18 to 24, 1,341 people (26.0%) aged 25 to 44, 1,283 people (24.9%) aged 45 to 64, and 964 people (18.7%) who were 65 or older. The median age was 40.0 years. For every 100 females, there were 96.5 males. For every 100 females age 18 and over, there were 93.7 males.

There were 2,319 housing units at an average density of 887.3 per square mile, of the occupied units 1,166 (57.8%) were owner-occupied and 853 (42.2%) were rented. The homeowner vacancy rate was 3.4%; the rental vacancy rate was 5.0%. 2,545 people (49.4% of the population) lived in owner-occupied housing units and 2,555 people (49.6%) lived in rental housing units.

== Economy ==
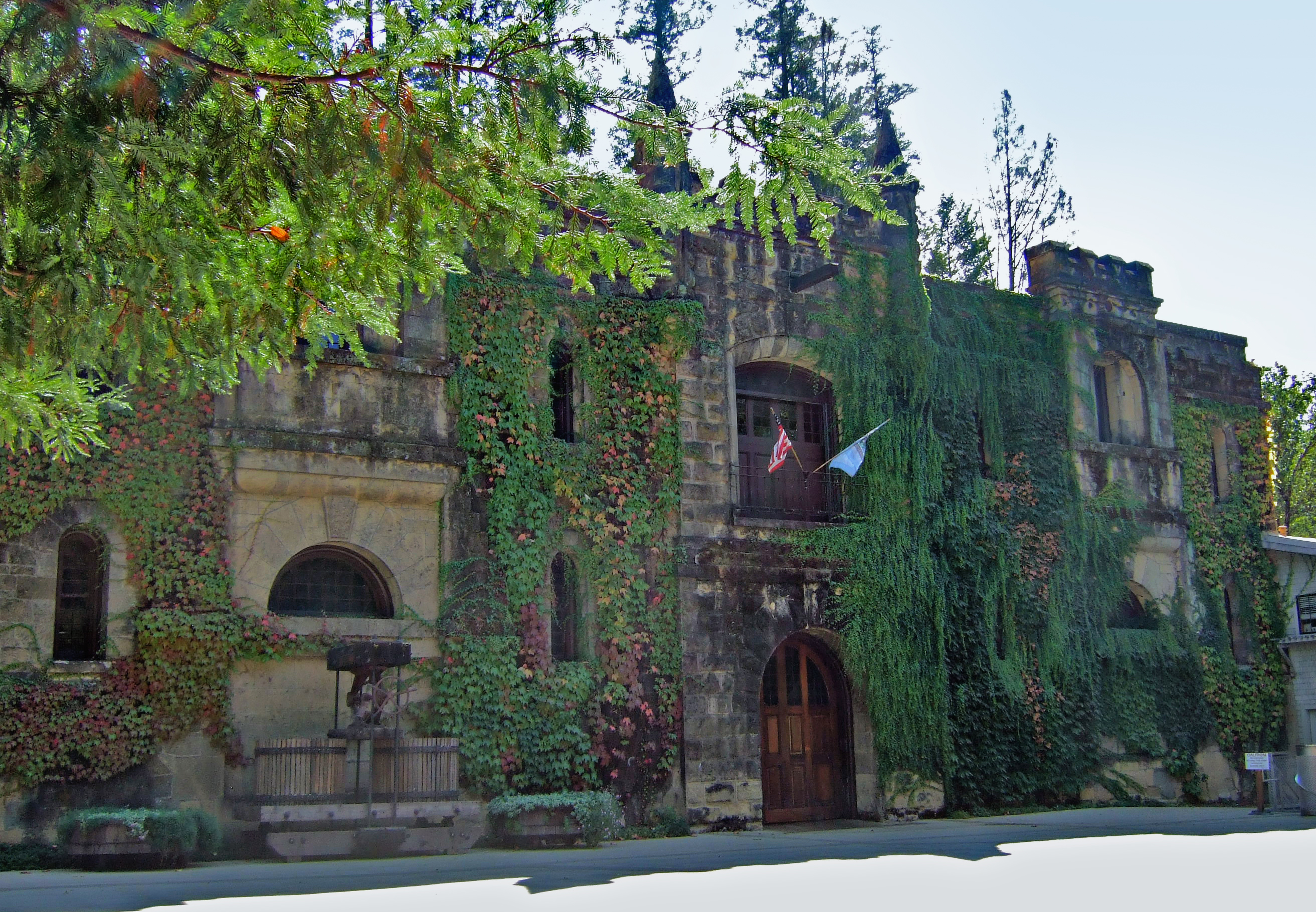
Chateau Montelena, built in 1882

Major employers in Calistoga include Solage resort, Calistoga Joint Unified School District, Indian Springs Calistoga resort, and the Calistoga Spa Hot Springs. Neighboring vineyards include Sterling Vineyards.

=== Tourism ===
Calistoga is at the north end of the Napa Valley Calistoga AVA, part of California's Wine Country. There are numerous wineries within a short drive. The city allows visitors to see Wine Country as it was before freeways and fast food—only two-lane roads lead there, including those segments of Highway 29 and Highway 128 that pass through Calistoga, and fast food franchises are banned by law.

Calistoga itself is noted for its hot springs spas such as Calistoga Spa Hot Springs. A local specialty is immersion in hot volcanic ash, known as a mud bath. Nearby attractions include an artificial geothermal geyser known as the "Old Faithful of California" or "Little Old Faithful". The geyser erupts from the casing of a well drilled in the late 19th century. According to Dr. John Rinehart, in his book A Guide to Geyser Gazing (1976 p. 49), a man had drilled into the geyser in search for water. He had "simply opened up a dead geyser".

== Government ==
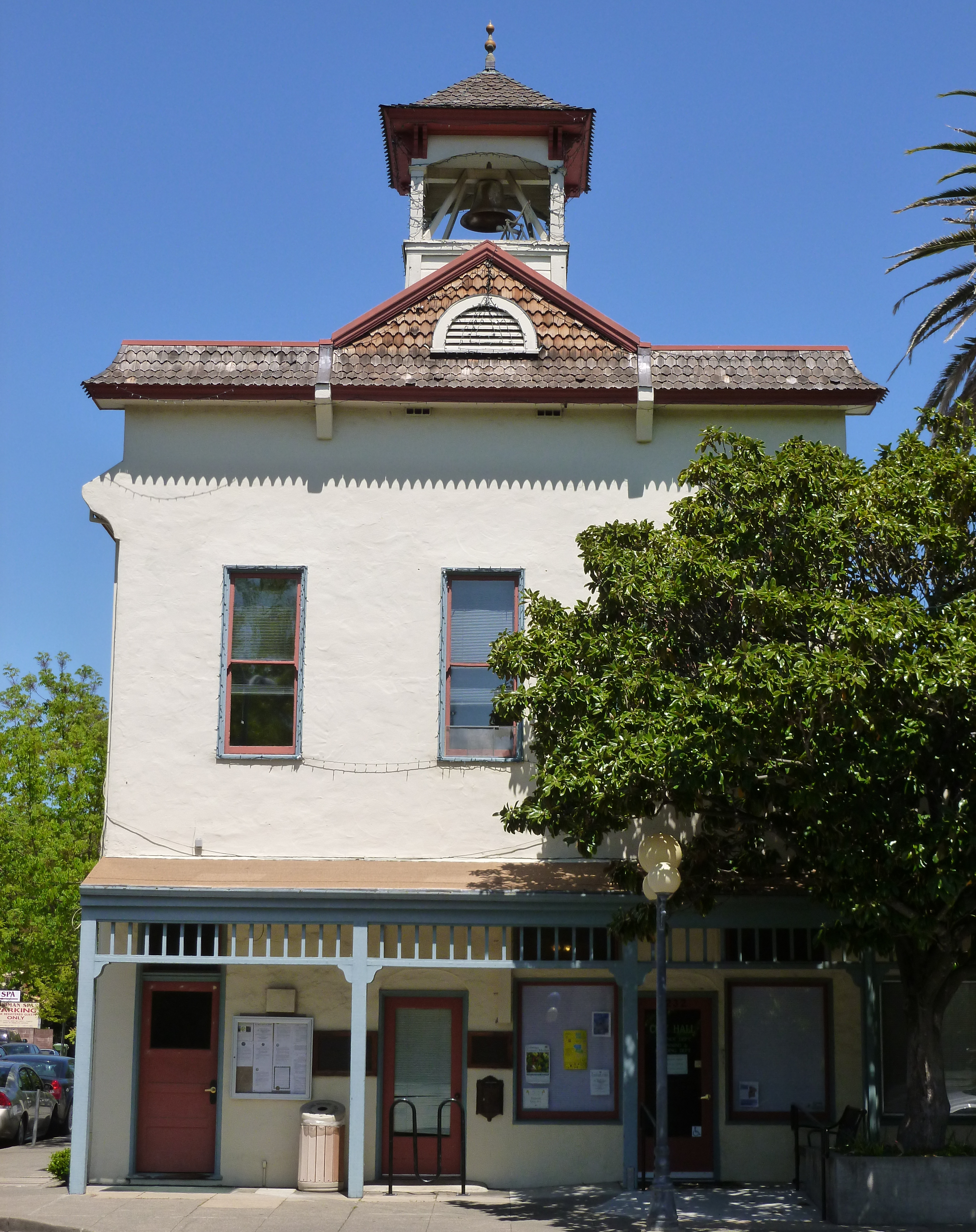
Calistoga City Hall

In the California State Legislature, Calistoga is in the 3rd senatorial district, represented by Democrat Christopher Cabaldon, and in the 4th Assembly district, represented by Democrat Cecilia Aguiar-Curry.

In the United States House of Representatives, Calistoga is in California's 4th congressional district, represented by Democrat Mike Thompson.

The above districts are based on the 2021 Redistricting in California.

The mayor of Calistoga is Donald Williams, who was elected in 2022 by a 27-vote margin. He defeated former fire chief Gary Kraus with 841 votes over Kraus's 814. Williams was sworn into office in December 2022.

During his tenure as mayor, Williams has focused on preserving Calistoga's small town character, expensive water rates, and the city's acquisition of the Napa County Fairgrounds.

== In popular culture ==
Scenes from the movie Hot Rod were filmed in and around Calistoga. Scenes from the Disney movie Bedtime Stories starring Adam Sandler were filmed in Calistoga in June 2008. The Netflix movie, Wine Country used Calistoga's downtown as a filming location in May 2018.

== Notable people ==
- Bob Knepper, former Major League Baseball player, attended Calistoga High School
- Tom Seaver, former Major League Baseball player, lived south of Calistoga
- Dick Vermeil, former head coach of the Philadelphia Eagles, St. Louis Rams, and Kansas City Chiefs, was born in Calistoga

== See also ==
- California Historical Landmarks in Napa County
