= 1898 Mare Island earthquake =

1898 earthquake in Northern California, United States

- UTC time: 1898-03-31 07:43
- USGS-ANSS: ComCat
- Local date: March 30, 1898
- Local time: 23:43
- Magnitude: 5.8–6.4 M_{w}
- Epicenter: 38.2°N 122.4°W
- Type: Unknown
- Areas affected: San Francisco Bay Area; Northern California; United States
- Total damage: $350,000
- Max. intensity: MMI IX (Violent)
- Tsunami: Possible

The 1898 Mare Island earthquake occurred in Northern California on March 30 at 23:43 local time with a moment magnitude of 5.8–6.4 and a maximum Mercalli intensity of VIII–IX (Severe–Violent). Its area of perceptibility included much of northern and central California and western Nevada. Damage amounted to $350,000 (about $10,700,000 inflation adjusted to 2018) and was most pronounced on Mare Island, a peninsula in northern San Francisco Bay. While relatively strong effects there were attributed to vulnerable buildings, moderate effects elsewhere in the San Francisco Bay Area consisted of damaged or partially collapsed structures, and there were media reports of a small tsunami and mostly mild aftershocks that followed.

The mechanism of the shock is unknown, but several independent investigations focused on different aspects to gain a better understanding of the intensity, magnitude, source fault, and epicenter of this pre-instrumental event. Most investigators placed it under or to the north of San Pablo Bay, though two earthquake catalogs gave specific coordinates that place it within the confines of the San Pablo Bay National Wildlife Refuge. One of the numerous strike-slip faults of the San Andreas Fault System in the North Bay are most often named as the source fault, but one seismologist's paper detailed how an unnamed dip-slip fault may have been responsible. Several more recent studies gave alternate perspectives that named specific faults as the origin.

== Tectonic setting ==
The San Andreas Fault system (SAF) is a network of right-lateral strike-slip faults that form a portion of a large complex and diffuse plate boundary. The faults span on and off shore along the California portion of the Pacific Rim, and in the area near San Francisco Bay, the extent of the various fault strands are limited to about 80 kilometers (50 mi) wide from east to west. This system of faults terminates in the north at the Mendocino triple junction where the north-northwest trending SAF meets the east trending Mendocino fracture zone. It terminates in the south in a more gradual fashion at the Salton Sea where displacement transitions to a series of transform faults and spreading centers along the Gulf of California Rift Zone.

== Earthquake ==
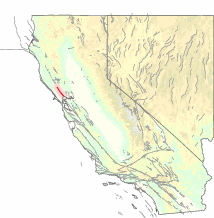
The Rodgers Creek Fault Zone

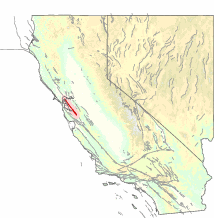
The Hayward Fault Zone

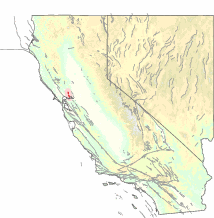
The Green Valley Fault

The shock was felt over an area of 120,000 km^{2}, from Chico in the north to Monterey in the south, and to Carson City in western Nevada. Toppozada et al. 1992 compared the isoseismal map from the event to those of earthquakes that occurred during the instrumental period to resolve the magnitude. The intensity VI isoseismals for the 1969 Santa Rosa and 1984 Morgan Hill earthquakes were markedly smaller; only the 1989 Loma Prieta earthquake covered a larger area than that of the 1898 event. The isoseismals for intensity V, VII, and VIII were also compared for additional calibration, and 6.7 was presented as the magnitude of the event, which was presumed to have occurred on the southern Rodgers Creek Fault. This estimate was later reduced to M6.4 in Toppozada & Branum 2002.

Bakun 1999 also analyzed intensity details to resolve for magnitude and location, resulting in M6.3 and a location at the northeast end of San Pablo Bay. A technique called Bayesian inference used by Wesson, Bakun, & Perkins 2003 showed that the northern Hayward Fault was the most likely source, with the Rodgers Creek, southern Green Valley, Concord, and northern Green Valley faults as the next most likely. Media reports of a small non-destructive tsunami led Parsons et al. 2003 to conclude that a normal fault (rather than a strike-slip fault) may have been responsible for the shock. Another viewpoint from Hecker et al. 2005 was that the Rodgers Creek Fault was not likely the source because their trench investigation showed that its most recent event had a maximum slip of 2 m (6 ft 7 in) and that the 1898 event was too small to result in that much displacement.

Another seismologist re-examined the event following the 2014 South Napa earthquake and found that the heavy effects on Mare Island were the result of weak or deficient buildings. Comparing the intensity distribution of the two shocks revealed that it was indeed severe on Mare Island as it was likely close to the rupture, which may have involved both strands of the Franklin Fault (between the West Napa and Rodgers Creek Faults). Although surface rupturing events have been documented on the Hayward–Rodgers Creek Fault System just to the west, no surface rupture was associated with this earthquake. A magnitude range of 5.8–6.4 M_{w} was given, with the lower bound representing an average stress drop event and the higher bound for a lower stress drop event.

=== Intensity ===
The isoseismal map from Toppozada & Real 1981 places the epicenter to the north of San Pablo Bay and shows elongated rings aligned NNW–SSE. The innermost intensity VIII (Severe) ring encompasses Vallejo, Mare Island, and much of San Pablo Bay, and also includes three instances of intensity IX (Violent), but the locations cannot be determined with accuracy due to a lack of map resolution. While San Francisco is within the intensity VII (Very strong) ring, Santa Cruz and San Jose are labeled intensity VI (Strong) exceptions within the intensity V (Moderate) ring. Ukiah, Stockton, Sacramento, and Gilroy also lay in the intensity V ring.

Toppozada et al. 1992 presents an updated isoseismal map that focuses on the near field rather than an extended perspective, with slightly more conservative maximum intensities, and locations that are clearly labeled with specific intensities. The innermost isoseismal shows only one location that is an exception to intensity VIII. Tubbs Island, to the northwest of Mare Island, lists VIII–IX. Schellville, Lakeville, and Mare Island all show intensity VIII. A large number of locations are marked VI–VII, including Santa Rosa, San Rafael, Oakland, and San Francisco. As opposed to showing a specific epicenter, the newer, enhanced map shows that it may have been anywhere within a broad swath centered on the southern Rodgers Creek Fault.

=== Damage ===
While the National Geophysical Data Center categorizes the overall effects of the event as moderate, significant damage occurred at the Mare Island Naval Shipyard, where several buildings suffered partial or total collapse and some equipment was damaged. Other strong effects occurred at Vallejo and to the southeast in Benicia, where a cannery was damaged and in Martinez where the courthouse was damaged. Other locations in Sonoma County that were severely affected included Schellville, Greenwood Estate, and near Petaluma Creek. The effects were less severe in San Francisco, but one building partially collapsed, a girls high school suffered damage valued at several thousand dollars, and soil conditions contributed to damage at the Whittier School.

=== Aftershocks ===
Bay Area newspapers reported on aftershocks that were felt in a number of locations. These shocks were only reported at locations that were within the intensity VII or higher isoseismals. The Sonoma Index-Tribune reported that at Sonoma there were four strong aftershocks and more than twenty lighter shocks (that at most just rattled windows) later that night. The San Francisco Call stated that while the aftershocks were heaviest near Tubbs Island, they were more frequent near Lakeville at the Petaluma marshes, and this was interpreted as the alluvium under the island suppressing the lighter shocks. Analysis of the severity, location, and frequency of the aftershocks bolstered Toppozada et al. 1992's stance that the origin of the mainshock was the southern Rodgers Creek Fault.

== Tsunami ==
Numerous bay area newspapers reported on various disturbances that were experienced by mariners. In the Pacific Ocean, vessels southeast of Point Reyes and near the Farallon Islands reported feeling the shock, and a sharp rise in sea level was reported in the San Francisco Bay and on the Napa River. Upon examination of the event, tsunami experts declared that while the Rodgers Creek Fault is primarily strike-slip, some vertical movement is possible, which is associated with tsunami generation. A five-point scale (0–4) was used to certify whether a tsunami event was legitimate. With 0 intended for "not a valid tsunami report" and 4 being "certainly a valid report", a score of 2 was assigned to the event, meaning that it was "possibly a valid report" based on insufficient information, nonexpert observations, and unclear descriptions.

== See also ==
- List of earthquakes in California
- List of historical earthquakes
