= Mount Diablo Thrust Fault =

Seismic fault in California, United States

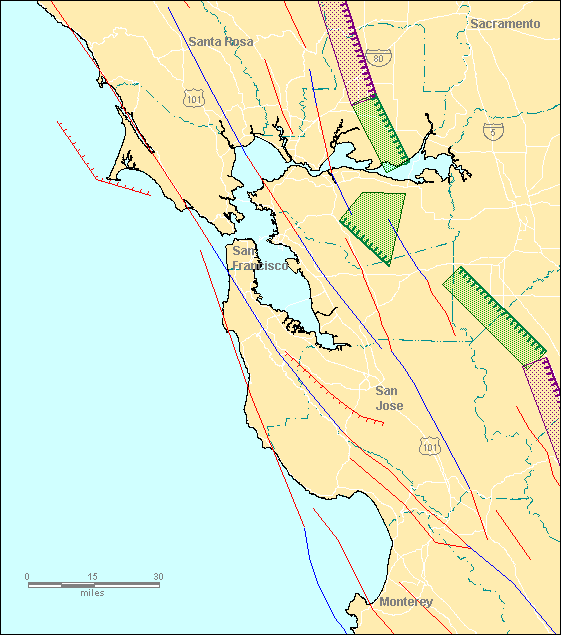
Locations of faults in the San Francisco Bay Area. The Mount Diablo Fault is the green quadrilateral near the center of the map.

The Mount Diablo Thrust Fault, also known as the Mount Diablo Blind Thrust, is a thrust fault in the vicinity of Mount Diablo in Contra Costa County, California. The fault lies between the Calaveras Fault, the Greenville Fault, and the Concord Fault, all right-lateral strike-slip faults, and appears to transfer movement from the Calaveras and Greenville Faults to the Concord Fault, while continuing to uplift Mount Diablo.

== Tectonic forces ==
The Pacific plate is a major section of the Earth's crust, gradually expanding by the eruption of magma along the East Pacific Rise to the southeast. It is also being subducted far to the northwest into the Aleutian Trench under the North American plate well north of San Francisco. In California, the plate borders the North American plate along a transform boundary, the San Andreas Fault. The westward component of the North American plate's motion and the irregularity of the San Andreas Fault results in some compressive force along the San Andreas and its associated faults, thus helping lift the Coast Ranges. The Mount Diablo Thrust Fault and the Great Valley Blind Thrust faults are consequences of this compression.

Movement along the Mount Diablo Thrust Fault includes crustal shortening of about 2.6 mm and uplift of about 1 mm per year.

== Seismic parameters ==
The Mount Diablo Thrust Fault is approximately 25 km long, and dips at an angle of 38 degrees to the northeast. The Mount Diablo Thrust Fault is capable of generating an earthquake of magnitude M_{W}=6.7. The predicted rupture surface begins 8 km below the surface, and there is thus no surface expression of the fault, and a low likelihood of surface rupture in the event of a large earthquake on the fault. No large historic earthquakes are known to have occurred on the Mount Diablo Thrust Fault. The recurrence interval for large earthquakes along the fault is predicted to be about 400 years.

== Related faults ==
Compressive stresses are produced by offset and converging slip-strike motions between the Calaveras Fault and the Clayton-Marsh Creek-Greenville Fault which manifest in the Mount Diablo Thrust Fault.

== Nearby cities ==
The Mount Diablo Thrust Fault underlays several cities and unincorporated communities in Contra Costa County: Alamo, Antioch, Blackhawk, Brentwood, Clayton, Concord, Danville, Diablo, San Ramon, and Walnut Creek.
