= 2007 Alum Rock earthquake =

2007 earthquake in the San Francisco Bay Area, California, United States

- UTC time: 2007-10-31 03:04:54
- ISC event: 13253322
- USGS-ANSS: ComCat
- Local date: October 30, 2007
- Local time: 20:04 PDT
- Magnitude: M_{w} 5.6
- Depth: 6.2 miles (10 km)
- Epicenter: 37.43°N 121.77°W
- Fault: Calaveras Fault
- Type: Strike-slip
- Areas affected: South Bay; Northern California; United States
- Total damage: Limited
- Max. intensity: MMI VI (Strong)
- Casualties: None

The 2007 Alum Rock earthquake occurred on October 30 at 8:04 p.m. Pacific Daylight Time in Alum Rock Park in San Jose, in the U.S. state of California. It measured 5.6 on the moment magnitude scale and had a maximum Mercalli intensity of VI (Strong). The event was then the largest in the San Francisco Bay Area since the 1989 Loma Prieta earthquake, which measured 6.9 on the moment magnitude scale, but was later surpassed by the 2014 South Napa earthquake. Ground shaking from the Alum Rock quake reached San Francisco and Oakland and other points further north. Sixty thousand felt reports existed far beyond Santa Rosa, as far north as Eugene, Oregon.

== Earthquake ==
The shock originated on the Calaveras Fault and ruptured an area of the fault for a length of about 5 km (3.1 mi) beginning at the hypocenter and extending southeast. There was no evidence of any surface rupture along the fault caused by the earthquake. David Oppenheimer, a seismologist at the United States Geological Survey (USGS), said that although the quake was felt as a strong jolt over a wide region, it was more significant because it caused stress changes in the Calaveras Fault and the nearby Hayward Fault.

=== Damage ===
Intensity VI (Strong) effects included broken windows and items that were knocked off store shelves, but the event caused no serious damage or injuries. Some parts of the Bay Area felt the rupture for up to 15 seconds.

=== Early warning ===
ElarmS, an earthquake early warning system, accurately predicted the quake seconds before it struck, correctly estimating the earthquake's magnitude to within 0.5 magnitude units using only three to four seconds' worth of data. Scientists with the California Integrated Seismic Network hope to refine the system to provide a 10-second warning in a similar quake to residents of Oakland and San Francisco.

== See also ==
- List of earthquakes in 2007
- List of earthquakes in California
- List of earthquakes in the United States
- UCERF3
