= Calaveras Fault =

Geological fault in northern California

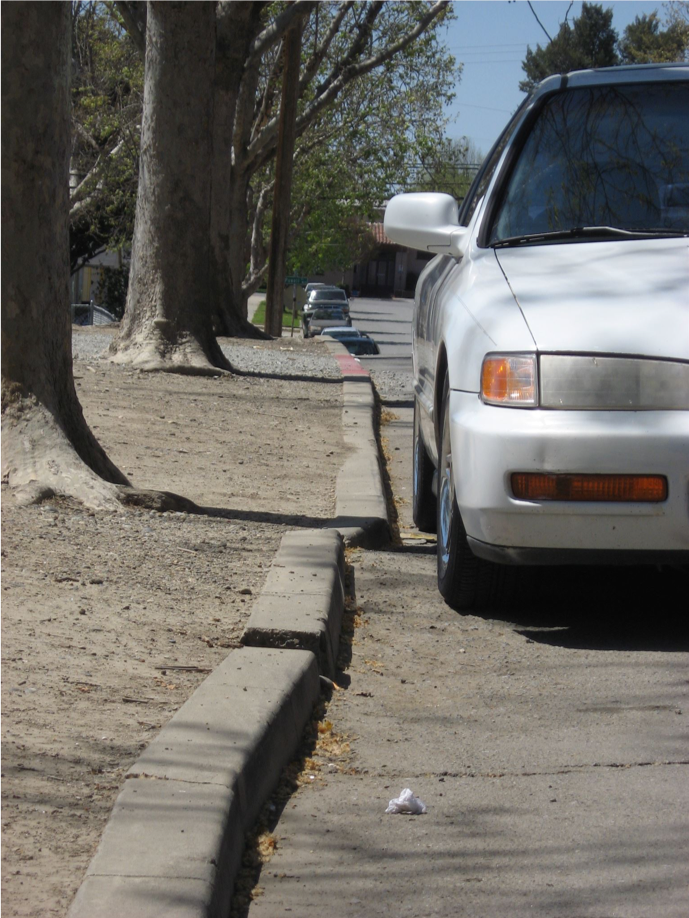
Calaveras Fault creep in downtown Hollister in April 2009

The Calaveras Fault is a major branch of the San Andreas Fault System that is located in northern California in the San Francisco Bay Area. Activity on the different segments of the fault includes moderate and large earthquakes as well as aseismic creep. An aseismic creep can be defined as a deformation within the Earth’s crust which produces a continuous, slow movement in the fault line which helps trigger earthquakes.The last large event was the magnitude 6.2 1984 Morgan Hill event. The most recent moderate earthquakes were the magnitude 5.1 event on 25 October 2022, and the magnitude 5.6 2007 Alum Rock event.

It is believed to link with the Hayward fault, as well as the West Napa Fault, north of the Carquinez Strait. It passes through or near the cities of Alamo, Danville, San Ramon, Dublin, Pleasanton, Sunol, Milpitas, San Jose, Gilroy, and Hollister. Despite not being as large of a fault line as the Hayward fault, the Calaveras fault produces an array of microearthquakes that disrupted day-to-day life.Within the last 30 days, this fault line produced approximately 5 earthquakes every 30 days. These earthquakes, on average, can be identified as “micro-quakes” or an earthquake that is of low intensity. Despite the earthquakes being small in force, the duration of the earthquakes can range from lasting minutes to even days.

== Location ==
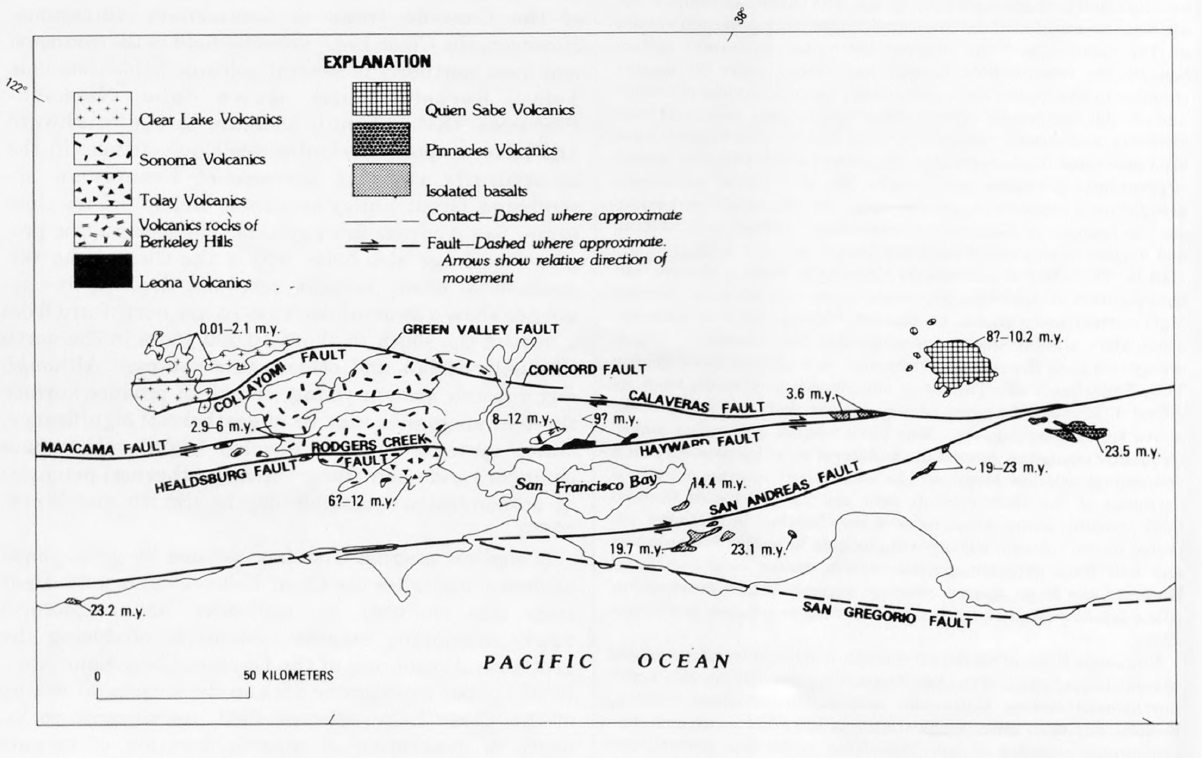
Geological map of the Calaveras Fault

To the east of the Hayward-Rodgers Creek fault, the Calaveras fault extends 76 mi (123 km), splaying from the San Andreas fault near Hollister and terminating at Danville at its northern end. (As of March 1978 it was believed that they did not quite connect.) It runs east of the San Andreas, diverging from it in the vicinity of Hollister, California, and is responsible for the formation of the Calaveras Valley there. Between the San Andreas Fault and the Calaveras Fault lies the Hayward Fault, which diverges from the Calaveras Fault east of San Jose, California. To the east lies the Clayton-Marsh Creek-Greenville Fault. These four fault structures are some of the major faults in California at the latitude of San Francisco. All are right lateral-moving strike-slip faults.

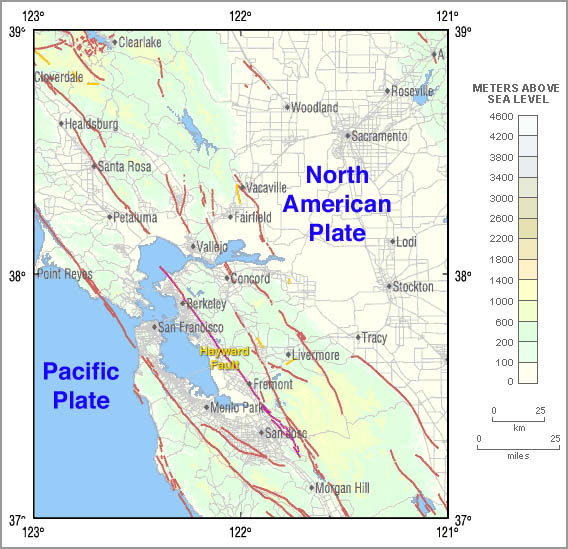
Elements of the San Andreas Fault System in the San Francisco Bay Area

The Calaveras Fault was named for Calaveras Creek (in Santa Clara County, east of San Jose), where it was first identified. ("Calaveras" is also the name of an unrelated California county in the western foothills of the Sierra Nevada mountains, some 100 mi (160 km) east of Santa Clara County, far from the Calaveras Fault.) Some of the cities which the Calaveras Fault passes through or near are: Alamo, Danville, San Ramon, Dublin, Pleasanton, Sunol, Milpitas, San Jose, Gilroy, and Hollister.

== Related faults ==
The West Napa Fault in Napa County is believed to be a continuation of the Calaveras Fault north of the Carquinez Strait. Between the faults lies an area of minor faults aligned en echelon known as the Contra Costa Shear Zone.

The minor Concord Fault lies to the east of the Calaveras Fault, and small earthquakes occur in the gap between faults, mostly in the vicinity of Alamo, California, relieving stresses generated by the displacement between the two faults. Stresses are also produced by offset and converging slip-strike motions between the Calaveras and Clayton-Marsh Creek-Greenville Fault that continue to elevate Mount Diablo. The compressive pressure is manifest in a significant thrust fault nearby on the western slope of the mountain, the Mount Diablo Thrust Fault, the most active of its kind in the region and which is also capable of producing significant local earthquakes affecting the Alamo-Danville area.

== Tectonic forces ==
The Pacific plate is a major section of the Earth's crust, gradually expanding by the eruption of magma along the East Pacific Rise to the southeast. It is also being subducted far to the northwest into the Aleutian Trench under the North American plate well north of San Francisco. In California, the plate is sliding northwestward along a transform boundary, the San Andreas Fault, toward the subduction zone. At the same time, the North American plate is moving southwestward, but relatively southeast along the fault. The westward component of the North American plate's motion results in some compressive force along the San Andreas and its associated faults such as the Calaveras Fault, thus helping lift the Coast Ranges. The Calaveras Fault shares the same relative motions of the San Andreas.

== Seismic activity ==
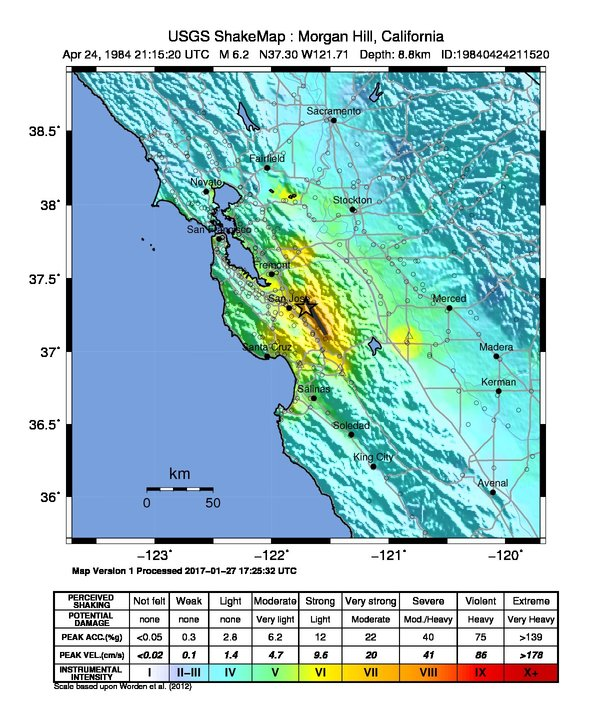
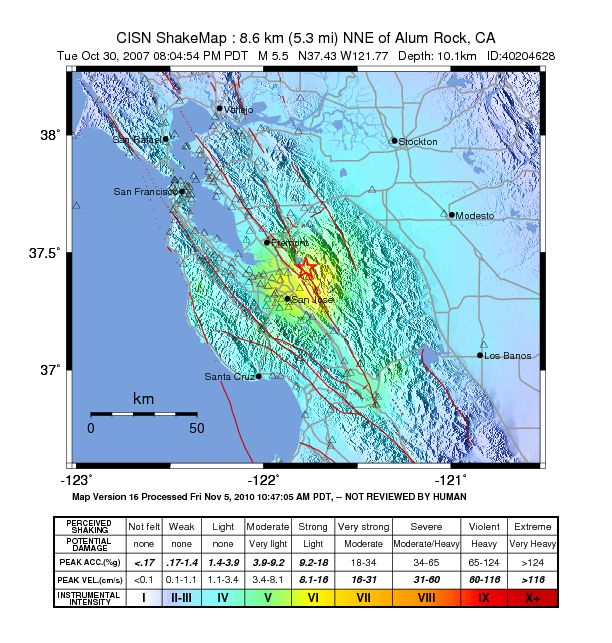
USGS ShakeMaps showing intensity patterns for the 1984 Morgan Hill (left) and 2007 Alum Rock events

Here are the notable recorded earthquakes on the Calaveras fault: 2022 (5.1), 2007 (5.6), 1984 (6.2) and 1911 (6.5).

A number of magnitude 6 earthquakes have been recorded on the fault throughout recorded history, the largest of which was a magnitude 6.5 that occurred in 1911 in the Morgan Hill area. The most recent of these was a magnitude 6.2 earthquake near Morgan Hill in 1984. This earthquake injured dozens and caused tens of millions of dollars of damage for Santa Clara County.

A magnitude 5.6 earthquake occurred on the Calaveras Fault on October 30, 2007, at 20:04 PDT (October 31, at 03:04 UTC), near Alum Rock. Prior to the 2014 South Napa earthquake, it was the most powerful quake to hit the Bay Area since the 1989 Loma Prieta earthquake, and the largest on the Calaveras Fault since 1984. On October 25, 2022, at 11:42 PDT (October 25, at 18:42 UTC), a magnitude 5.1 earthquake occurred on the fault near Lick Observatory.

The United States Geological Survey estimates with a 26% probability that the Calaveras fault will produce an earthquake nearing 6.7 magnitude around 2043. This estimate effectively establishes this fault line to be the third most dangerous fault splits from the San Andreas system. This means that the fault line has a decent probability to produce a large earthquake, despite being a smaller fault line than a larger fault line such as the San Andreas Fault. The ranking regarding the hazard of the fault line puts into perspective how even a smaller fault line can create catastrophe.

== Monitoring Velocity Variations ==
Taking into consideration that the Calaveras fault predominately produces microearthquakes, a precise way to monitor the velocity variations within these earthquakes is through figuring out the differences between the times of these microearthquakes and then recording the same frequency domain through cross correlation of short windows of signal. Velocity variations can be defined as the variations in the flow velocity which occurs in a moving velocity field, influenced by an array of factors such as shear layer, presence of horizontal vertices, and streamwise and spanwise fluctuations. Figuring out velocity variations amongst the already occurred earthquakes can allow scientists to more greatly predict the accuracy of when an earthquake will occur and the strength of the earthquake, transforming the prediction accuracy of earthquakes.

== Hayward Fault connection ==
Although it has been known for some time that the Calaveras and Hayward faults merge in the South Bay region, recent geological studies suggest that the Calaveras and Hayward faults may be even more closely connected horizontally deep beneath the surface, angling toward each other with depth until they become a single fault. If true, this would have significant implications for the potential maximum strength of earthquakes on the Hayward, since this strength is determined by the maximum length of the fault rupture and this rupture could extend beyond the juncture point to include some portion of the Calaveras.

== Recent assessment ==
Assessments in January 2008 suggest that the northern Calaveras fault (the portion between Sunol and Danville) may be more likely to fail in the next few decades than previously thought.

== See also ==
- Bernal Subbasin
- Tesla Fault
