= 2000 Yountville earthquake =

Earthquake in California

- UTC time: 2000-09-03 08:36:30
- ISC event: 1739620
- USGS-ANSS: ComCat
- Local date: September 3, 2000
- Local time: 01:36 PDT
- Magnitude: 5.0 M_{w}
- Depth: 9.4 kilometers (6 mi)
- Epicenter: 38.38°N 122.41°W
- Type: Strike-slip
- Areas affected: North Bay (San Francisco Bay Area); California, United States
- Total damage: $10–50 million
- Max. intensity: MMI VII (Very strong)
- Peak acceleration: 0.5 g
- Casualties: 41 injured

The 2000 Yountville earthquake occurred with a moment magnitude of 5 on a previously unmapped fault, about 3 miles (4.8 km) south southwest of Yountville, California in the Mayacamas Mountain Range under Mount Veeder and about 9 miles (14 km) south northwest of Napa, California. It occurred at 01:36 PDT (08:36 UTC) on September 3.

== Earthquake ==
The earthquake occurred at a depth of 9.4 km on a northwest-oriented fault and with a right-lateral strike-slip motion. The epicenter of the earthquake was near the West Napa Fault, a previously unmarked fault.

== Damage ==
Several unreinforced masonry buildings in downtown Napa suffered exterior damage as a result of the earthquake. Sixteen buildings were red tagged following the event and 168 were yellow tagged. Although the magnitude of the primary event was considered moderate, shaking was intensified in the city of Napa and surrounding area due to the sedimentary soil on the floor of the valley. The earthquake caused an interruption of power to approximately 10,000 Pacific Gas and Electric Company customers. Several hundred houses suffered toppled or cracked chimneys and several instances of broken plumbing due to toppled water heaters were reported. Transportation infrastructure in the affected area did not suffer any significant damage from the earthquake.

== See also ==
- List of earthquakes in 2000
- List of earthquakes in California
- List of earthquakes in the United States
