= Sam Kee Laundry Building =

- U.S. National Register of Historic Places
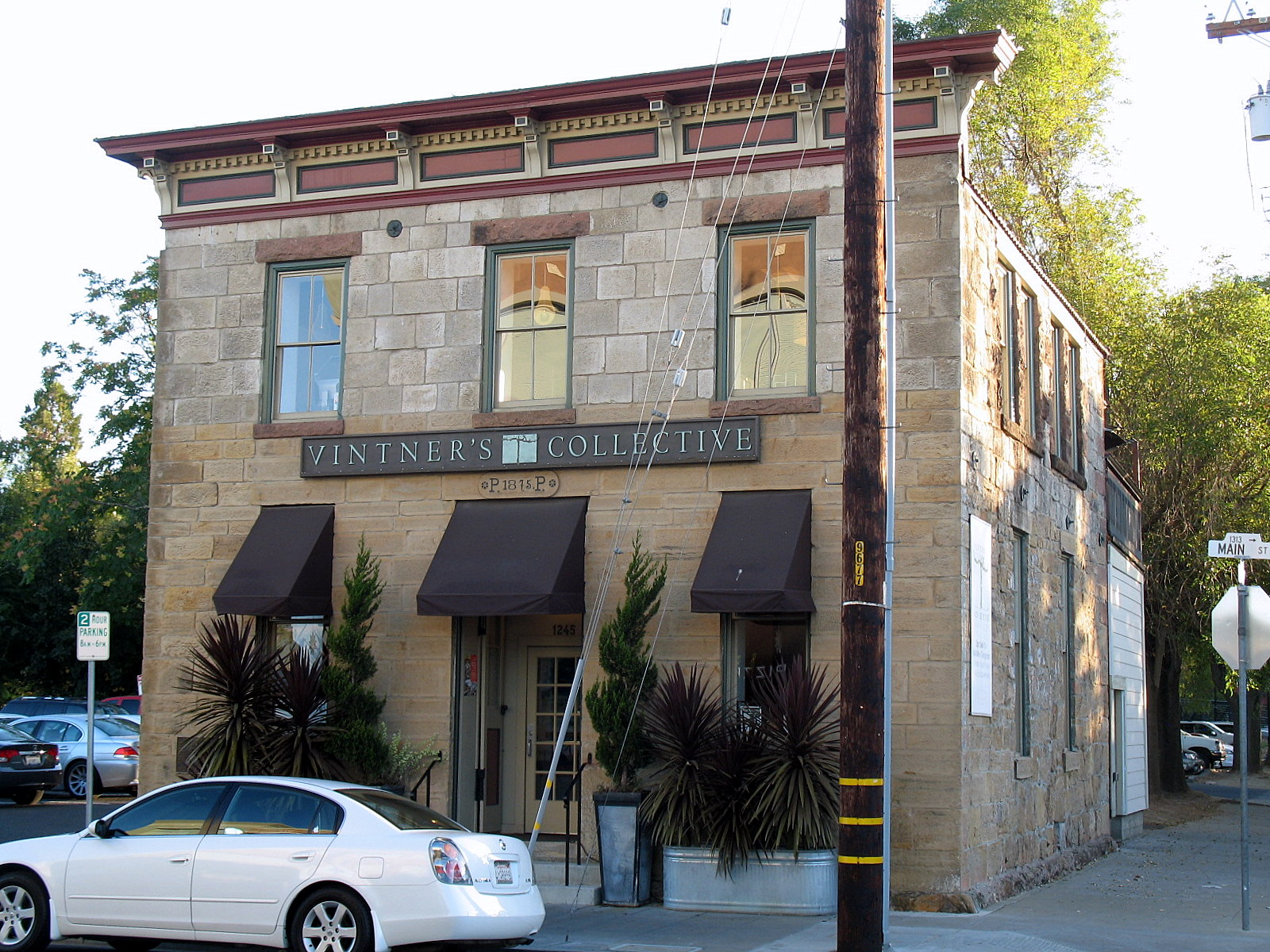

- Location within California Location within the United States
- Location: 1245 Main St., Napa, California
- Coordinates: 38°18′4″N 122°17′11″W
- Area: 0.1 acres (0.040 ha)
- Built: 1875
- NRHP reference No.: 74000540
- Added to NRHP: October 1, 1974

The Sam Kee Laundry Building, also known as the Pfeiffer Building, is a historic building located at 1245 Main St. in Napa, California. Built in 1875, the building is the oldest stone building and commercial building in Napa. The building has a generally simple design topped by a decorative Italianate cornice. As of 1880, the building was part of a brewery, which may have been the first brewery in Napa; it has since housed a boarding house, a saloon, and a laundry. The building currently houses the Vintner's Collective, a wine tasting bar.

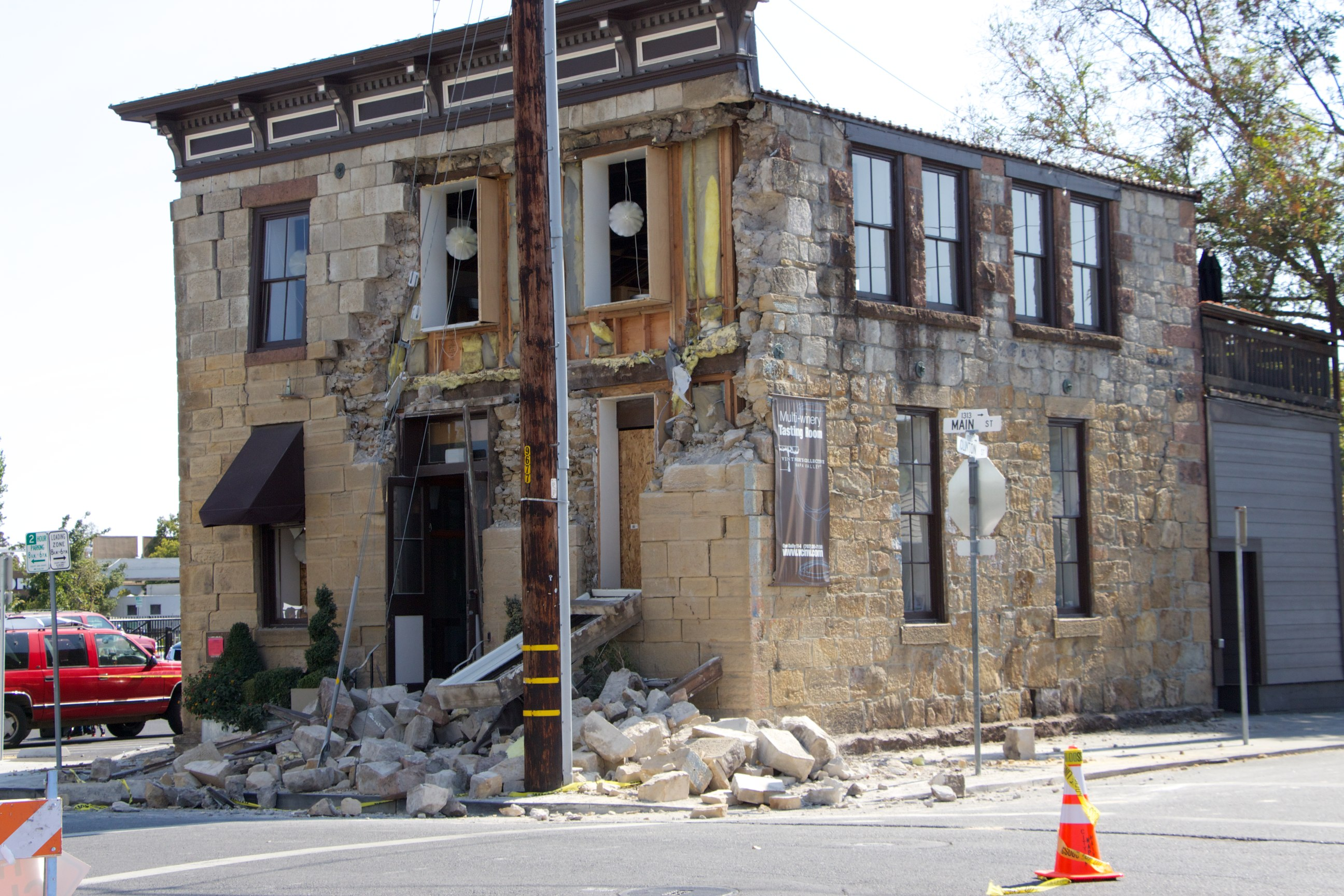
The building after the 2014 South Napa earthquake.

The building was added to the National Register of Historic Places on October 1, 1974.

The building was damaged by the 2014 South Napa earthquake. It was reopened in January 2015, and as of August 2015 continued to undergo restoration of its exterior.
