= West Napa Fault =

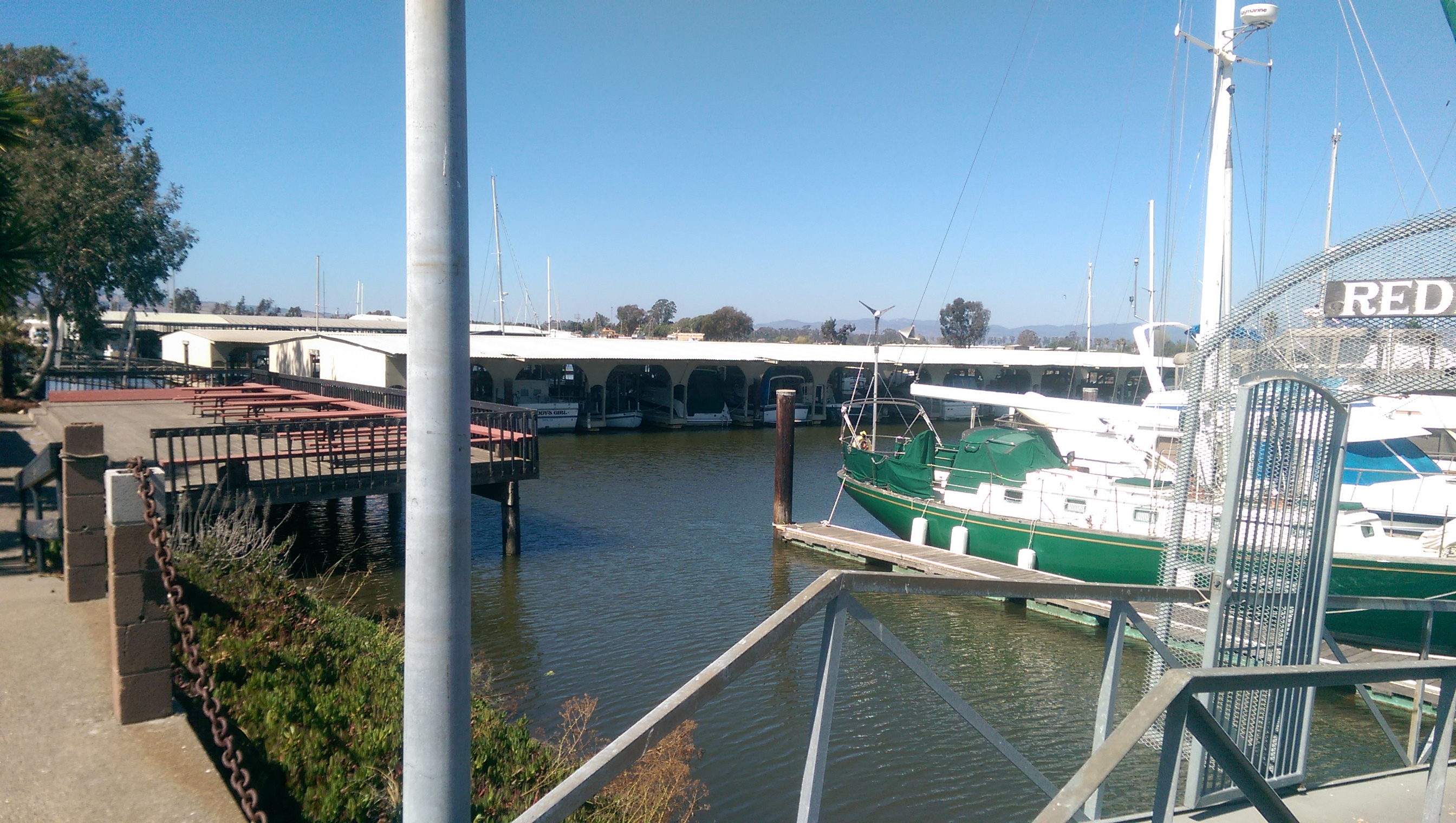
The reported epicenter of the 2014 South Napa earthquake was located beneath the Napa Valley Marina

The West Napa Fault is a 57 km (35 mi) long geologic fault in Napa County, in the North Bay region of the San Francisco Bay Area in northern California. It is believed to be the northern extension of the Calaveras Fault in the East Bay region.

It has been mapped as a Late Pleistocene-Holocene active fault, and is considered to be predominantly a right lateral strike-slip fault. The fault was discovered in 1976 by Gene Boudreau, a ground water drilling specialist from Sebastopol. In 2023 there was data showing that the West Napa Fault is actually nine miles longer than previously known.

== Earthquakes ==
The West Napa Fault is a likely source for the magnitude 6.0 South Napa earthquake that hit Napa County on August 24, 2014. Seismologists were not able to determine the exact fault on which the quake occurred, because faults are usually identified by their expression on the surface.

The epicenter for the 2000 Yountville earthquake which occurred on September 3, 2000, is also near the West Napa Fault.

== See also ==
- Green Valley Fault – northern extension of the East Bay Concord Fault.
- Geology of Napa County, California
- Quaternary California
