= Clayton-Marsh Creek-Greenville Fault =

Coordinates: 37.7°N 121.67°W

The Clayton-Marsh Creek-Greenville Fault is a fault located in the eastern San Francisco Bay Area of California, in Alameda County and Contra Costa County. It is part of the somewhat parallel system of faults that are secondary to the San Andreas Fault.

== Seismic activity ==
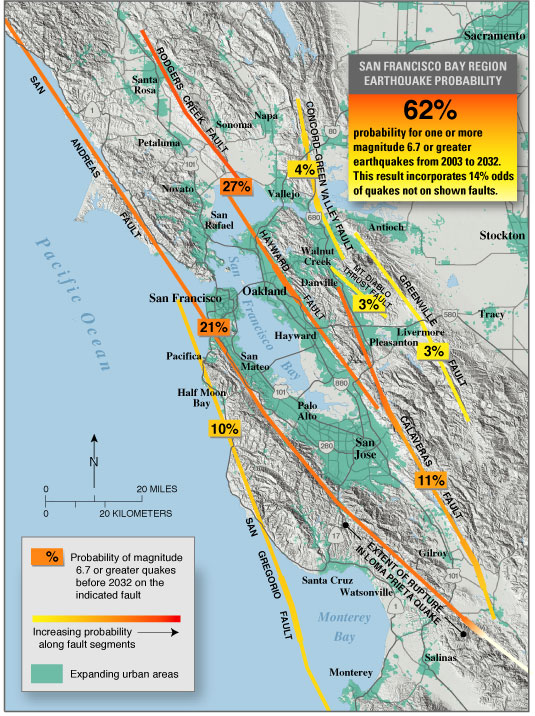
Earthquake probability map associated with different faults in the Bay Area.

The 5.8 magnitude 1980 Livermore earthquake occurred on this fault. The fault creeps at a rate of at 2 mm/year. The predicted probability of a major earthquake on this fault within the next 30 years is relatively low, at 3%, compared to nearby faults such as the Hayward Fault.

== See also ==
- Calaveras Fault
- Concord Fault

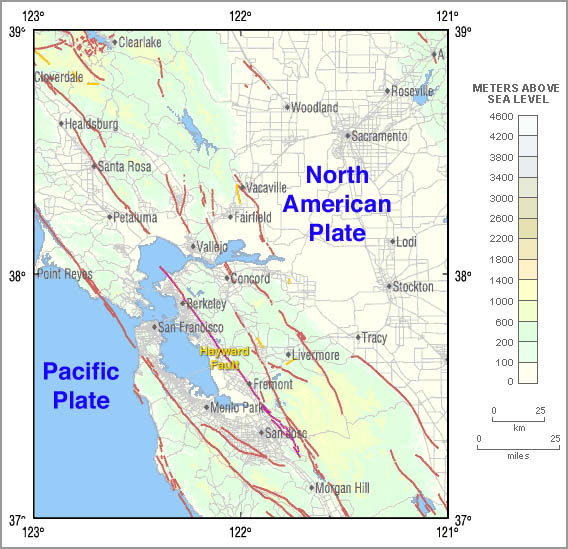
For recent activity in the region shown on this map see the USGS map for this location. With appropriate browser settings the "live" maps will also show all of the names of faults shown on the map as you rollover with the cursor.
