= Goodman Library =

- U.S. National Register of Historic Places
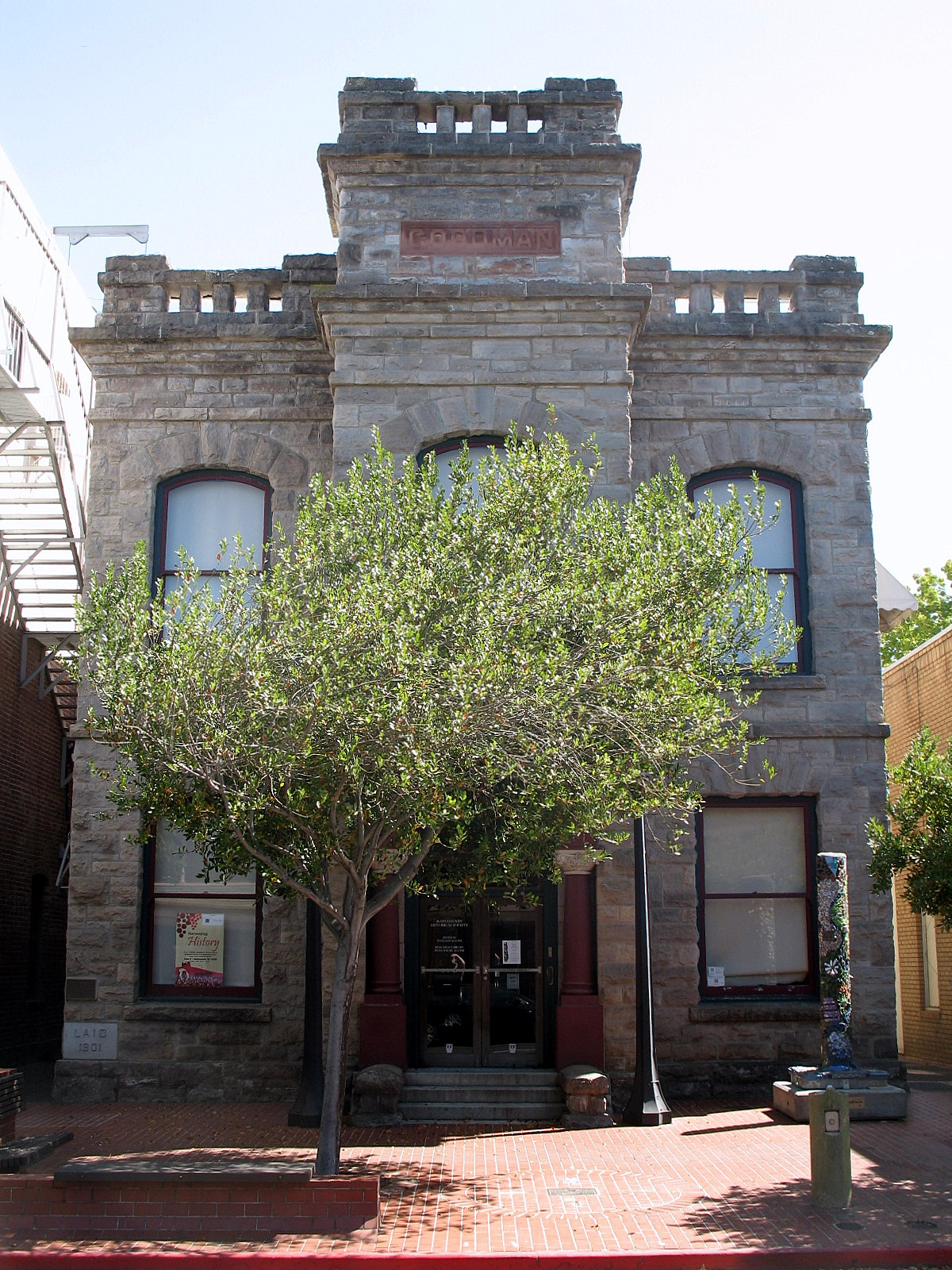

- Location within California Location within the United States
- Location: 1219 1st St., Napa, California
- Coordinates: 38°17′53″N 122°17′10″W
- Area: 0.1 acres (0.040 ha)
- Built: 1901
- Architect: Turton, Luther M.
- Architectural style: Beaux Arts, Romanesque, Richardson Romanesque
- NRHP reference No.: 74000539
- Added to NRHP: January 21, 1974

The Goodman Library is a historic library located at 1219 1st St. in Napa, California. Built in 1901, the library was paid for by George E. Goodman and built on land donated by Goodman. Architect Luther M. Turton designed the building in the Richardson Romanesque style, which can be seen in its use of rusticated stone, round arch windows, and massive scale. The design represented a shift in Napa architecture, which was mainly Victorian prior to the library's construction.

== History ==
The Goodman Library is the longest-operating library in California, partially due to a clause in Goodman's donation of the building. Goodman stipulated that the building would remain in the city's possession as long as it served as a library but would otherwise revert to his heirs.

When Napa moved its city library to a different building in the 1970s, the Napa County Historical Society acquired the building for its research library so it would still satisfy its original purpose. At one time, the library housed both the historical society and Napa County Landmarks.

The library was added to the National Register of Historic Places on January 21, 1974.

The building was damaged by the 2014 South Napa earthquake. A $1.75M contract to repair damage to the building including bracing and a new roof was awarded in January 2017. The work began in April 2017 and was completed in early 2018. The Napa County Historical Society reopened their operations by summer 2018 and maintains library services and an exhibit space to this day.
