= First Presbyterian Church (Napa, California) =

Historic church in California, United States

- U.S. National Register of Historic Places
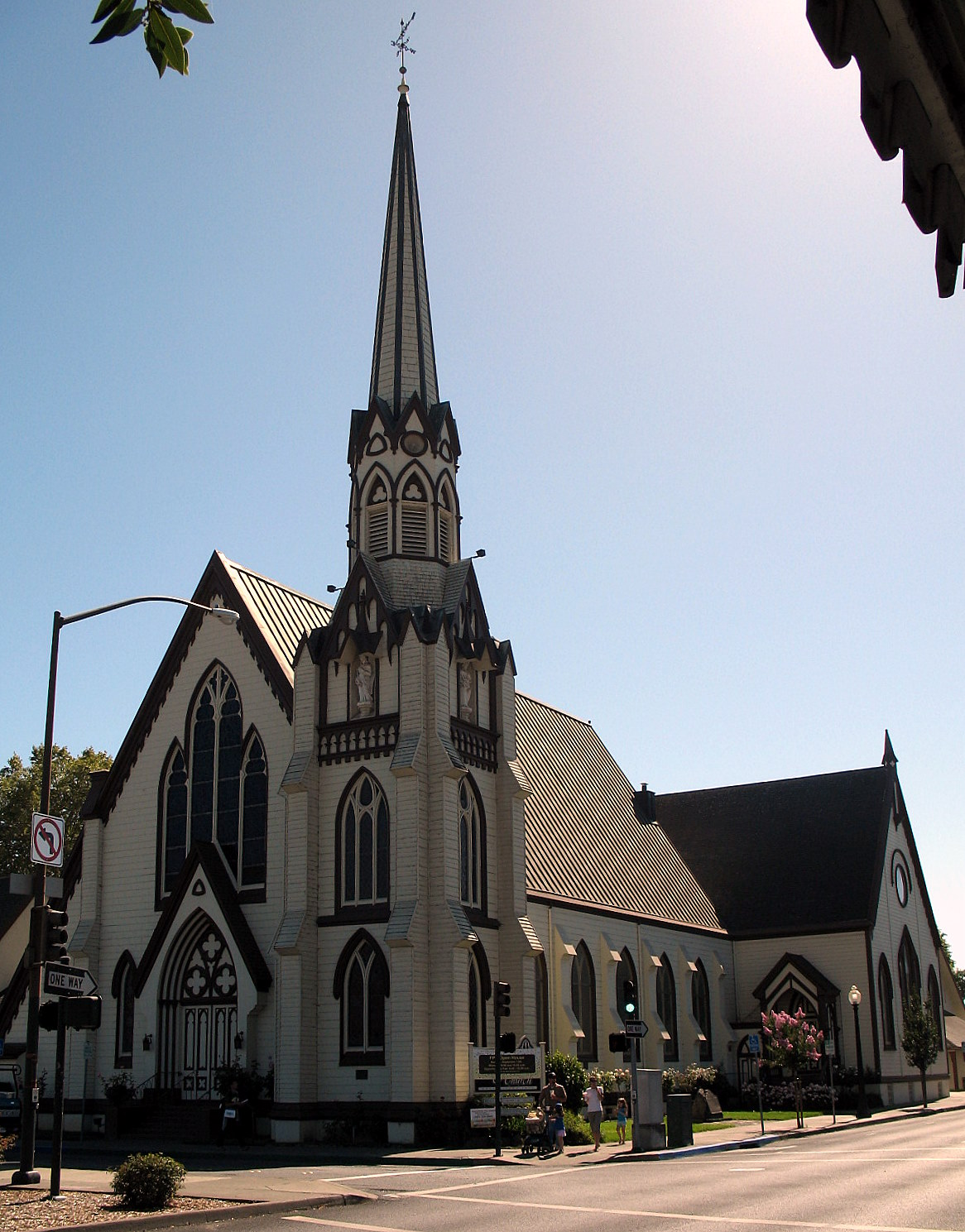

- Location within California Location within the United States
- Location: 1333 3rd St., Napa, California
- Coordinates: 38°17′46″N 122°17′9″W
- Area: 0.2 acres (0.081 ha)
- Built: 1874
- Architect: Daley & Eisen; Batchelor, J.W.
- Architectural style: Neo-Gothic
- NRHP reference No.: 75000446
- Added to NRHP: June 5, 1975

First Presbyterian Church is a historic church at 1333 3rd Street in Napa, California.

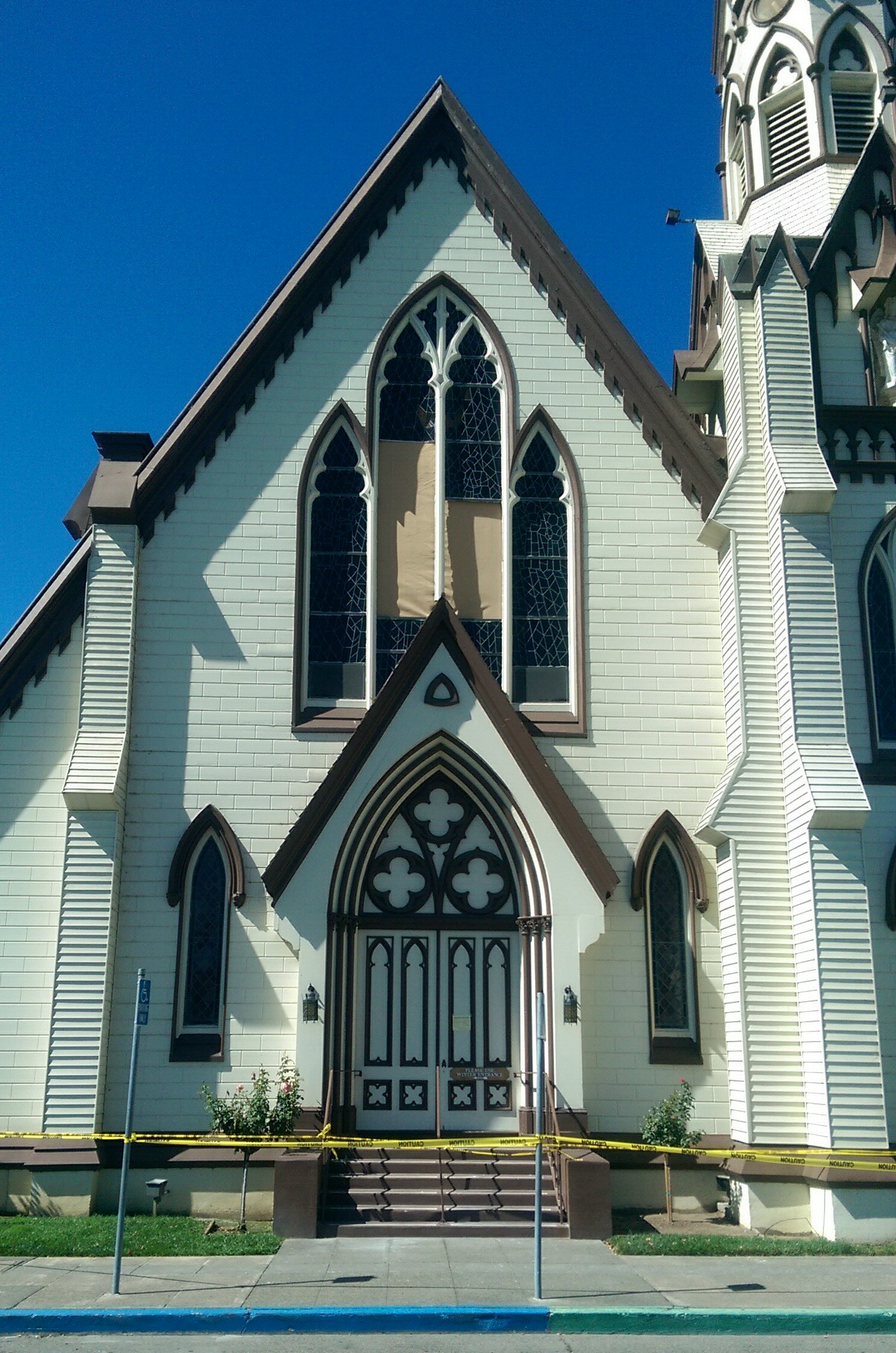
2014 earthquake damage to the First Presbyterian Church

It was built in 1874 in the Neo-Gothic style and was added to the National Register of Historic Places in 1975. The building was damaged by the 2014 South Napa earthquake. The church's congregation moved back into the sanctuary in July 2016 following repairs and restoration.
