= 2014 South Napa earthquake =

Earthquake in California in 2014

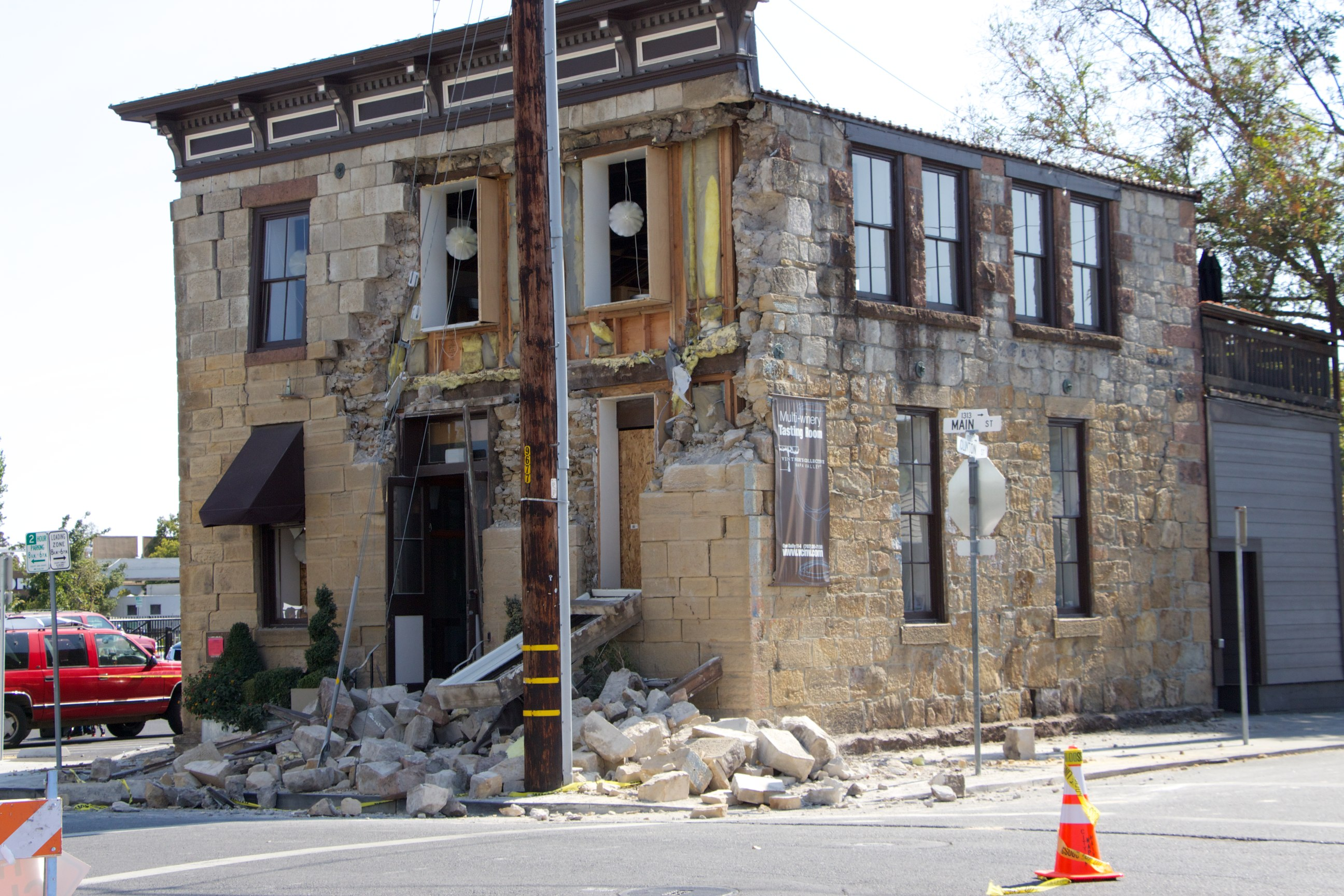
- Damage to the Sam Kee Laundry Building

- UTC time: 2014-08-24 10:20:44
- ISC event: 610572079
- USGS-ANSS: ComCat
- Local date: August 24, 2014
- Local time: 03:20:44 PDT (UTC-7)
- Magnitude: 6.0 M_{w}
- Depth: 7 mi (11 km)
- Epicenter: 38.22°N 122.31°W
- Fault: West Napa Fault
- Type: Strike-slip
- Areas affected: North Bay (San Francisco Bay Area); California, United States
- Total damage: $362 million–$1 billion
- Max. intensity: MMI VIII (Severe)
- Peak acceleration: 0.61 g
- Casualties: 1 killed about 200 injured

The 2014 South Napa earthquake occurred in the northern San Francisco Bay Area on August 24 at 03:20:44 Pacific Daylight Time. At 6.0 on the moment magnitude scale and with a maximum Mercalli intensity of VIII (Severe), the event was the largest in the San Francisco Bay Area since the 1989 Loma Prieta earthquake. The epicenter of the earthquake was located to the south of Napa and to the northwest of American Canyon on the West Napa Fault.

Total damage in the southern Napa Valley and Vallejo areas was in the range of $362 million to $1 billion, with one person killed and 200 injured. Other aspects of the event included an experimental earthquake warning system that alerted seismologists several seconds before the damaging shear waves arrived, temporary changes in springs and wells, and the potential for postseismic fault creep.

== Tectonic setting ==
The San Andreas Fault System is an active plate boundary comprising right-lateral strike-slip faults that runs nearly the length of California. This network of faults trends north-northwest in the area of the West Napa Fault, where it is 50 miles (80 km) wide from west to east. The West Napa Fault transfers slip between a group of related faults (including the Concord Fault and the Calaveras Fault) called the Contra Costa Shear Zone, which was assigned a maximum slip rate of 1mm/yr in the third Uniform California Earthquake Rupture Forecast. The authors of a separate study that focused on Global Positioning System data gave an estimated slip rate of 4±3mm/yr for the West Napa Fault.

== Earthquake ==
The mainshock was magnitude 6.0, with a depth of 11.3 km. The United States Geological Survey (USGS) estimated that 15,000 people experienced severe shaking, 106,000 people felt very strong shaking, 176,000 felt strong shaking, and 738,000 felt moderate shaking. The earthquake lasted 10 to 20 seconds, depending on location. At least twelve aftershocks followed, including one of magnitude 3.9. The earthquake was the largest earthquake in the Bay Area since the magnitude 6.9 1989 Loma Prieta earthquake. Governor Jerry Brown declared a state of emergency due to the severe damage and the possibility of aftershocks. President Obama declared a major disaster for Napa and Solano counties.

=== Damage ===
Several older commercial buildings in downtown Napa showed signs of extensive external damage even though many had been retrofitted for earthquake safety protection. The Goodman Library, Napa County Courthouse Plaza, Sam Kee Laundry Building, Downtown U.S. Post Office, Alexandria Hotel and Annex, Native Sons of the Golden West building, First United Methodist Church, and First Presbyterian Church all suffered moderate to extensive damage.

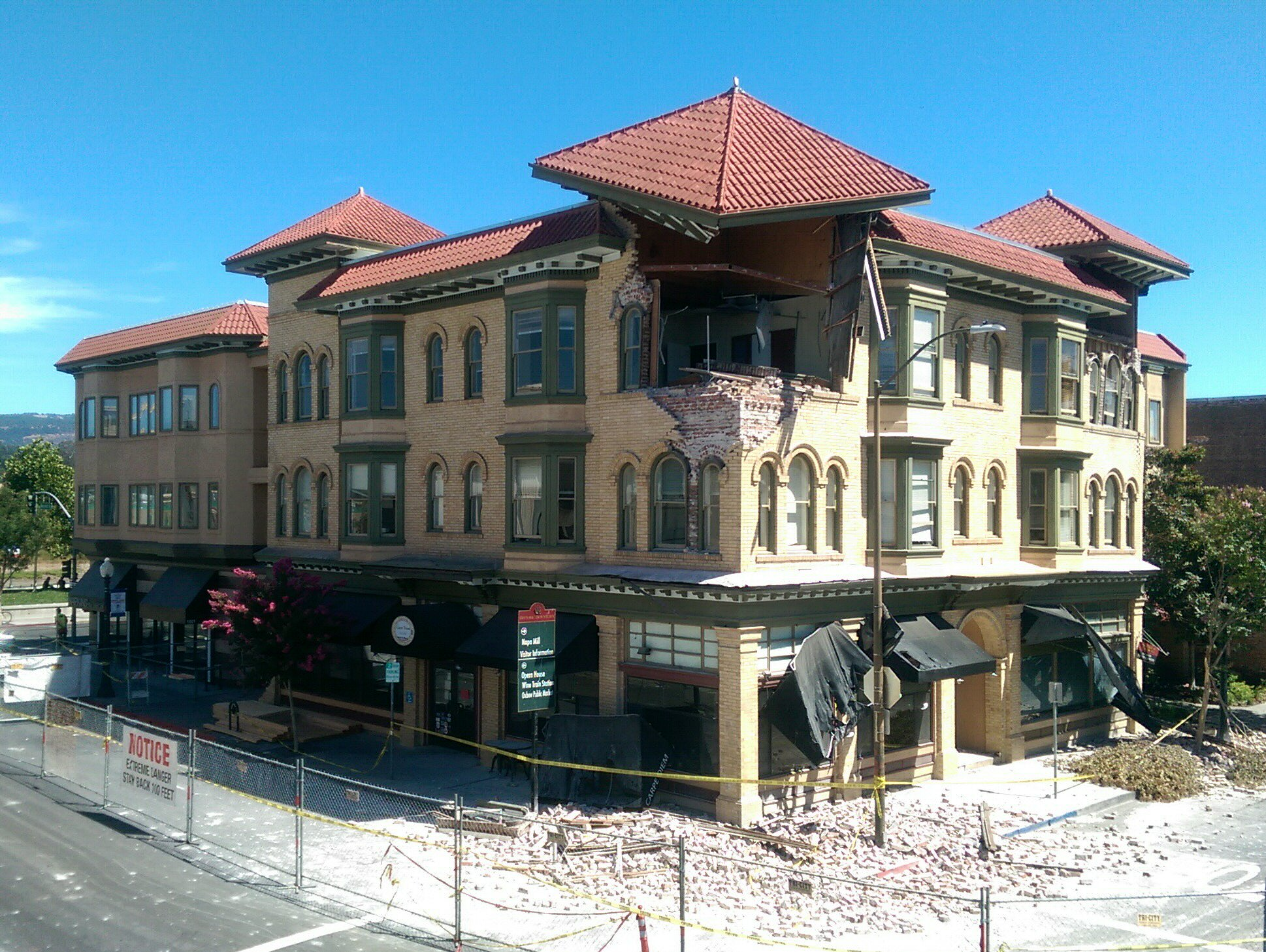
Damaged Alexandria Square building in Napa

All of these buildings are listed on the National Register of Historic Places, as is the Thomas Earl House, a historic residence that was badly damaged. Although the structure of the Uptown Theater was determined to be sound, the building was red-tagged due to damage to the theater's ceiling. Several newer commercial buildings also suffered damage. Six major fires broke out, and four homes in Napa Valley Mobile Home Park located in north Napa were destroyed. Firefighters were hampered in their efforts to fight this fire by a broken water main. In Vallejo, several hundred storefront windows shattered and many building walls suffered extensive damage. A water main on Mare Island broke.

Following the first round of building inspections by the City of Napa inspectors, a total of 613 structures had been tagged; 113 were red-tagged and 500 had been yellow-tagged. Pavement on several roads in Napa, Solano and Sonoma Counties buckled and cracked during the quake.

Within days, County officials estimated the damage at $362 million. According to an early estimate by the USGS, the economic costs to Napa County may go as high as $1 billion. Several wineries including Hess Collection and Trefethen Vineyards suffered damage to buildings and infrastructure. Several wine storage facilities also suffered damage and loss of property. Estimates of the damage to the wine industry were downgraded to between $80 and $100 million in a September 5, 2014, report from Silicon Valley Bank to the Napa County Board of Supervisors.

On September 16, 2014, in a report to the Napa City Council, members were briefed on the status of damage sustained. City Staff reported that 156 commercial and residential structures had been red-tagged and 1398 had been yellow-tagged. It was also reported that the estimate for damage to the city's infrastructure had reached $57.9 million. This total included repairs made to 144 water mains, repairs or replacement of a compromised water tank in Browns Valley that is part of the city's water system and repair of 294 locations where streets and sidewalks had been damaged.

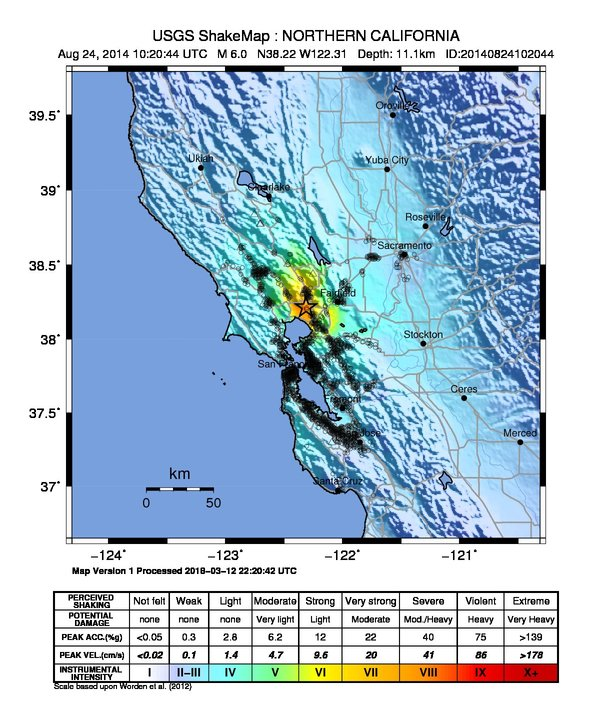
USGS ShakeMap for the event

=== Injuries ===
About 200 injured people were treated at Queen of the Valley Medical Center in Napa. Thirteen of those injured were admitted. Many of the injuries were lacerations and abrasions from fallen debris. At least six of the injuries were classified as critical. In Vallejo, 49 people were injured, including two who were hospitalized. CNN reported one individual still in critical condition, later discovery determined as a 58-year-old male who went through two surgeries, awakening four days later in ICU to discover it was going to take him approximately two years to learn how to walk again. One person died September 5 as a result of injuries from the quake.

=== Recovery ===
Several of the historic buildings damaged in the earthquake were repaired. The Uptown Theater was the first to reopen on November 9, 2014. The congregation of the First Presbyterian Church moved back into the sanctuary in July 2016 following repairs and restoration at a cost of $850,000. The United Methodist Church received $2.2 million in repairs and upgrades and reopened the doors to its congregation in November 2015. A$1.75 million contract to repair damage to the Goodman Library was awarded in January 2017. The United States Postal Service determined that repairing the building would be too costly and sold it to a developer for $2 million. An $11.6 million contract for restoration of the courthouse was awarded by Napa County in August 2017. The heavily damaged Trefethen Vineyard Eschol building was restored from earthquake damage following over two years of repairs and improvements.

=== Hydrologic effects ===
The event was credited with large, temporary increases in the water flow of several nearby streams, including Carriger Creek, Calabasas Creek, Felder Creek, Sonoma Creek, Tulocay Creek, Green Valley Creek, and Wild Horse Creek. In addition, the water levels of several wells in the Sonoma Valley rose suddenly at the time of the quake, in one instance by 5 feet (1.5 m).

== Earthquake warning ==
An experimental earthquake warning system being developed by the Berkeley Seismological Laboratory issued a warning upon detecting the P waves five seconds before the slower, more destructive S waves arrived in Berkeley. Initially this was reported to be a 10-second warning in Berkeley, but revised information indicates only a 5-second warning was provided. This means the S waves had already arrived in Napa and Vallejo when the warning was issued.

Seismic Warning Systems, Inc., a private earthquake warning company based in Scotts Valley, California, had installed on-site warning systems at five fire stations in Vallejo in 2002 and 2003. These systems commanded the bay doors to open at these fire stations between 1.7 and 2.4 seconds before the S waves arrived at each fire station.

Earthquake warning systems could potentially give people time to take cover in the event of a quake, preventing injuries caused by falling debris, automatically stopping trains or shutting off gas lines. The system being developed at the Berkeley Seismological Laboratory (called ShakeAlert) in conjunction with the United States Geological Survey, the California Institute of Technology and the University of Washington, will eventually cover the entire West Coast. The system would cost $80 million in funding to run for five years in California, or $120 million for the whole West Coast. In December 2014, United States Congress approved a $5 million allocation as part of the Consolidated Appropriations Act, 2014 in order to expand funding for development of the system.

== See also ==
- List of earthquakes in 2014
- List of earthquakes in California
- List of earthquakes in the United States
