= North Bay (San Francisco Bay Area) =

Subregion of the San Francisco Bay Area in California, United States

Coordinates: 38.3°N 122.5°W

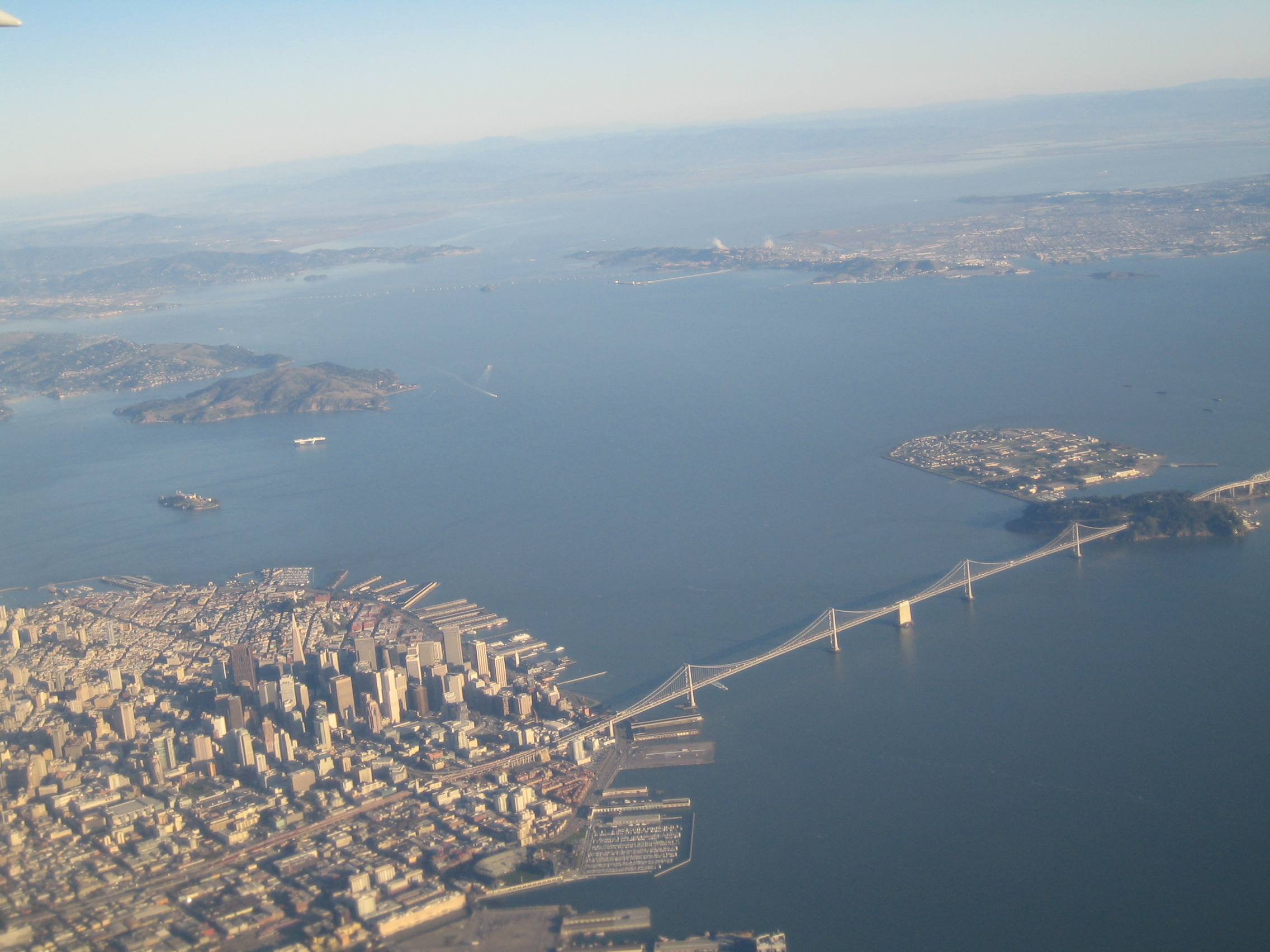
San Francisco is in the foreground in this picture looking north. San Pablo Bay continues north surrounded by parts of (left to right) Marin, Sonoma, Solano and Napa Counties.

The North Bay is a subregion of the San Francisco Bay Area in California. The largest city is Santa Rosa, which is the fifth-largest city in the Bay Area. It is the location of the Napa and Sonoma wine regions, and is the least populous and least urbanized part of the Bay Area. It consists of Marin, Napa, Solano and Sonoma counties.

== Transportation ==
The North Bay is connected to San Francisco by the Golden Gate Bridge and to the East Bay by the Richmond–San Rafael Bridge, Carquinez Bridge and the Benicia–Martinez Bridge. Several ferry routes operate between the North Bay and San Francisco, from terminals located in Angel Island, Larkspur, Sausalito, Tiburon and Vallejo.

The Sonoma–Marin Area Rail Transit (SMART), a commuter rail line from Larkspur to Cloverdale, was approved by voters in November 2008. Passenger service began between the Sonoma County Airport station and San Rafael in August 2017 and was completed as far south as Larkspur in 2019.

== Law enforcement ==
The law enforcement in the Sonoma–Marin Area Rail Transit is being provided by its contracted law enforcement agencies.

== History ==
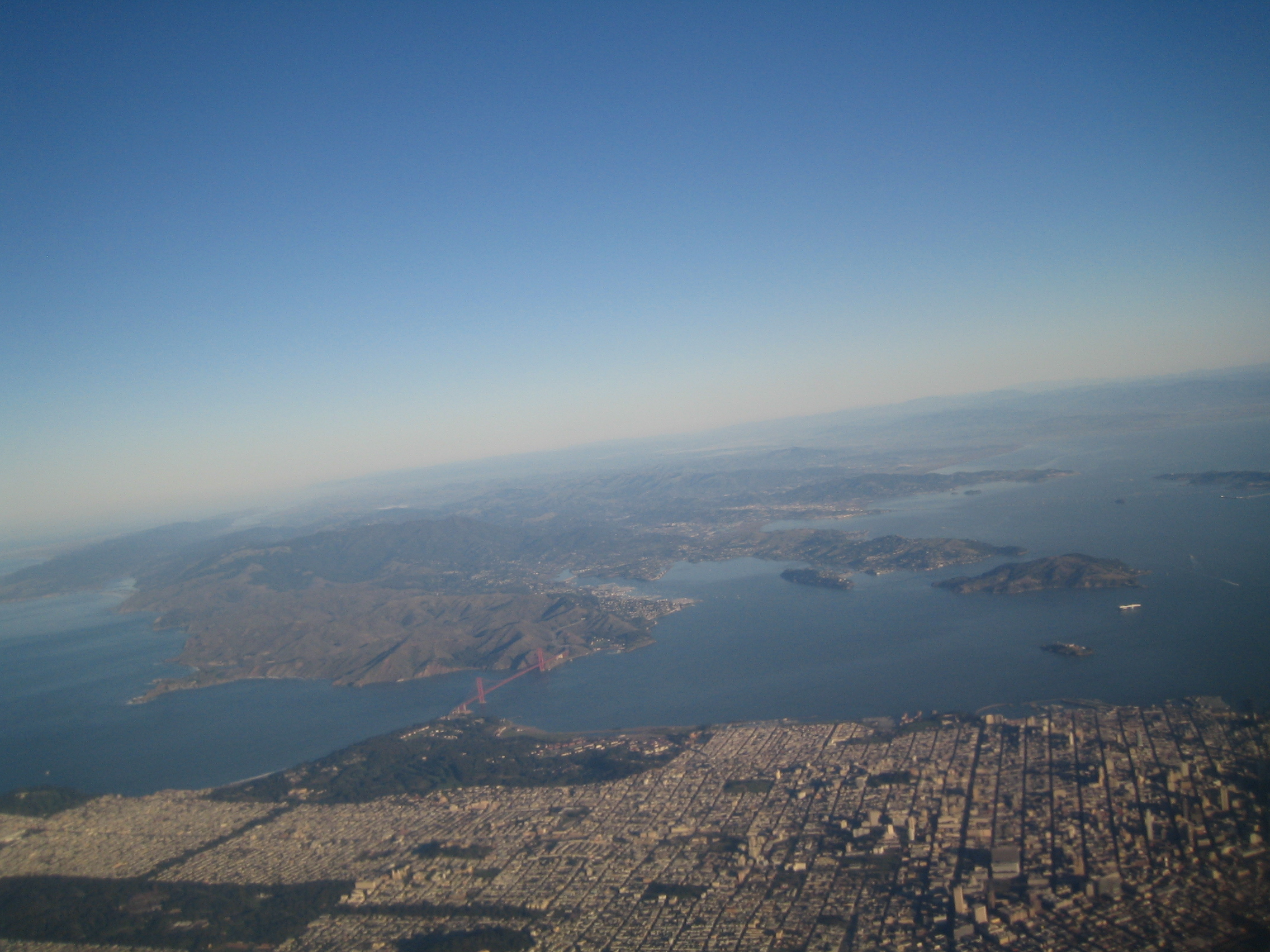
San Francisco in the foreground looking north over Marin.

The area was the home of Pomo Native Americans before European invasion. The Russians first settled the area at Fort Ross as a fur-trading post, but the area was later settled by the Spanish-Mexican Alta California. The Bear Flag Revolt took place in the town of Sonoma, which is also the location of the last of the California Missions. General Mariano Guadalupe Vallejo, the last secretary to the Governor of California before its annexation to the United States, kept his home in Sonoma; his ranch, now a National Historic Landmark, was in nearby Petaluma.

The North Bay remained isolated and rural well into the 20th Century. The opening of the Golden Gate Bridge in the 1930s transformed Marin County from a dairy farming region into an upscale suburban area. Until the 1990s, the region's growth was at a gradual pace, with significant restrictions on development being imposed in Marin and Napa Counties in the 1970s (future Senator Barbara Boxer was an important figure in the North Bay's open space preservation movement).

== Major cities ==
The largest city in the North Bay is Santa Rosa, with a population of 175,000.

Other major cities include: (sorted by population)

- Vallejo 121,000
- Fairfield 116,000
- Vacaville 100,000
- Napa 80,000
- Petaluma 60,000
- San Rafael 59,000
- Novato 56,000

== See also ==
- North Coast AVA
- North Coast (California)
- San Pablo Bay National Wildlife Refuge
- Suisun City
