= Concord Fault =

Geologic fault in California, US

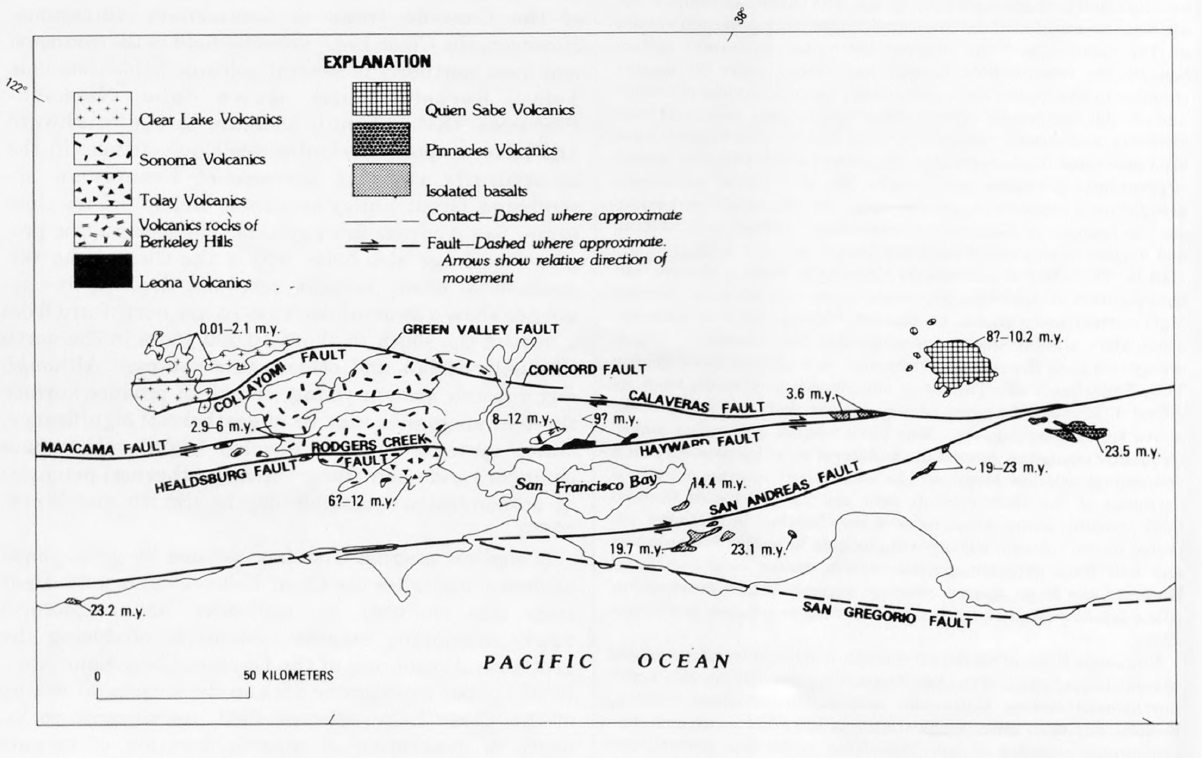
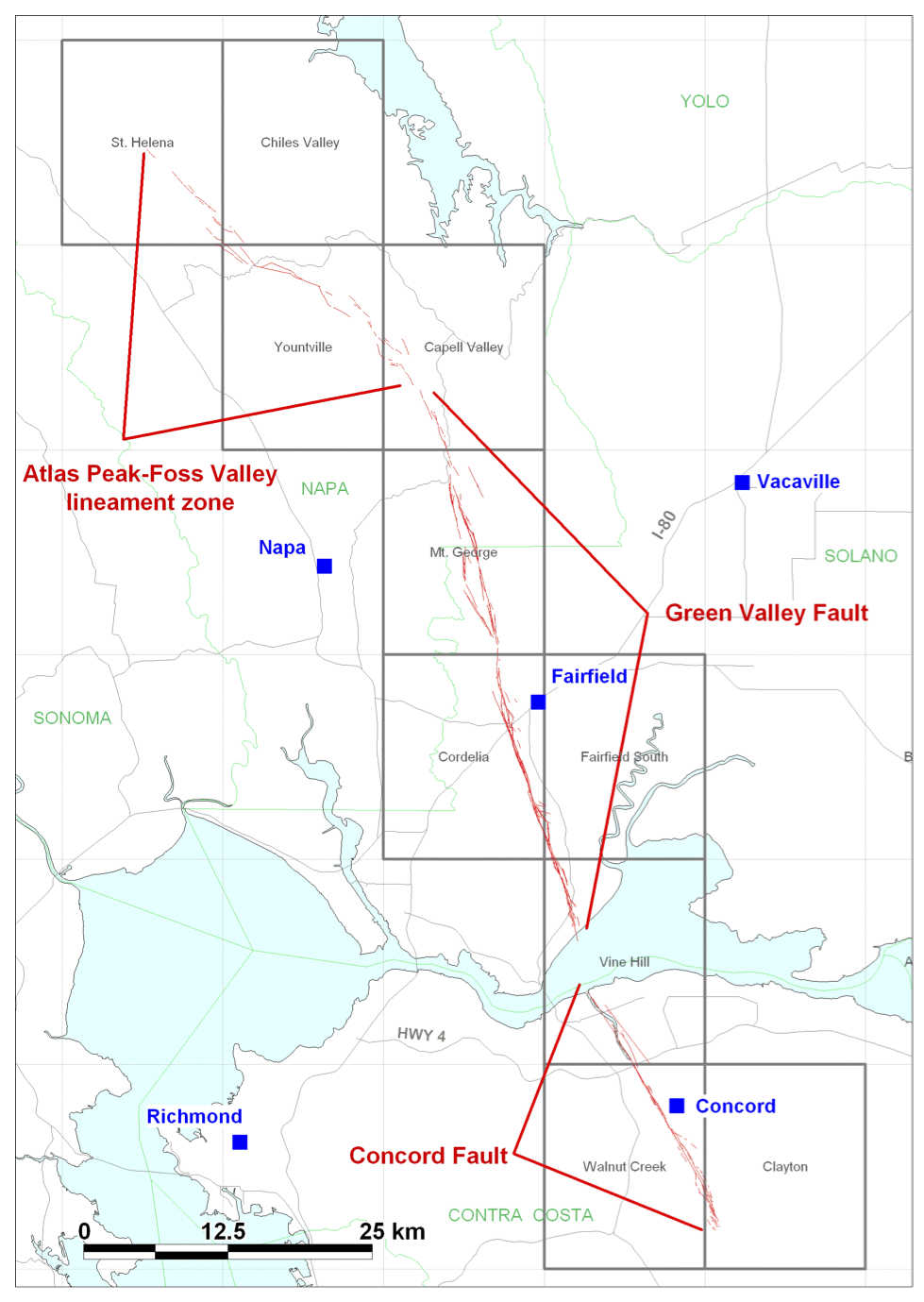
Geological maps of the Concord and Green Valley faults

The Concord Fault is a geologic fault in the San Francisco Bay Area, located underneath the City of Concord, diagonally bisecting the west and east sides of the city in Contra Costa County. It is connected to, and considered to be part of, the same fault zone as the Green Valley fault, which lies just a few miles to the north across the Suisun Bay. The fault is situated at the east of West Napa Fault and extends from Mount Diablo to the Carquinez Strait, an approximately 11 mile long distance. Like most other faults in this area, the Concord Fault is a strike-slip fault, moving approximately 2.7 to 3.6 millimeters a year.The Concord Fault was discovered in 1935, but is thought to have been in existence for 2,600 years, as proven by the radiocarbon dating of the Holocene alluvium that makes up most of the geological substrate of the plate.

== Seismic activity ==
Currently, it is considered to be under a high stress level because it is a strike slip fault line between the Pacific and North American tectonic plates, a transform boundary which is moving rapidly each year. The Pacific plate moves northwest at an incredible speed of 8.5 cm a year on average, and the North American plate moves at a rate of 2.3 cm every year. It therefore has a higher chance of a major earthquake happening. There have been earthquakes on this fault before. On October 23, 1955, a 5.4 magnitude quake caused about 1 million dollars in damage (about 8.7 million today) and one death. As of 2025, seismologists say that it could cause a 6.7 magnitude quake due to its new creeping cracks that are measured to be around 300mm further west than last measured in 2014. The last large earthquake linked to this fault occurred over 400 years ago.

== Dangers ==
According to USGS seismologists it is "the most urban fault" in the East Bay, with potential for a larger event than the 2014 South Napa earthquake. As critical infrastructure, including refineries that process a significant portion of the state's total crude oil, and a railroad bridge, lie under it, a major earthquake from it could leave the entire northern half of the state without fuel and disrupt transmission of electricity and water to some extent across the state. One particular pumping station, if hit by a quake, would particularly damage transmission of fuel. According to new reports by a USGS seismologist in 2025, the fault has the capability to lower property values in the Concord area, due to its proximity to very urban areas. Not only would a major earthquake cause damage, but the smaller fault lines that shift by millimeters every year (far more frequently than the main strand of the fault line) can cause great damage to the surrounding infrastructure. There is an expectancy, as predicted by the Working Group for California Earthquake Probability, that an earthquake will occur along the fault line within the next 30 years, especially since the fault line has been inactive for as long as at least 400 years, increasing the chance of a large scale earthquake in the next few decades. A major earthquake there could also cause flooding, which would impact drinking quality, and a loss of electricity,another threat to the city and surrounding area's infrastructure, along with smaller creeping fault lines.
