= Carter House Inn =

Hotel in Eureka, California

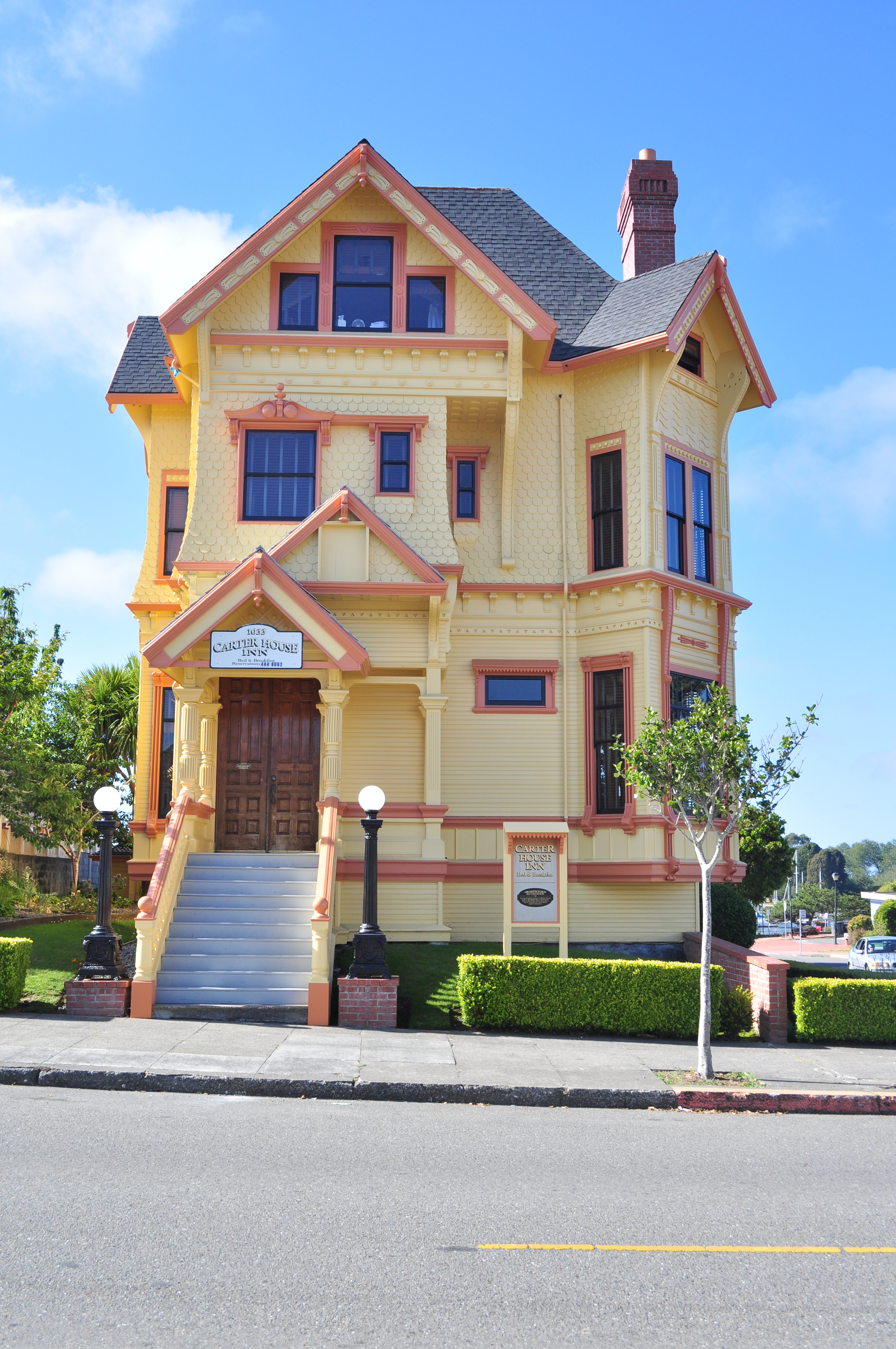
- Carter House Inn
- Interactive map of the Carter House Inn area

General information
- Location: Eureka, California, 301 L Street
- Coordinates: 40°48′16.5″N 124°9′35.93″W
- Opening: 1982
- Owner: Mark Carter

Technical details
- Floor count: 3

Design and construction
- Architects: Newsom & Newsom

Other information
- Number of rooms: 8
- Number of restaurants: 1

Website
- CarterHouse.com

The Carter House Inn is a hotel in Old Town Eureka, California. It is known both for housing Restaurant 301 and for being a replica of a Queen Anne style building by Newsom and Newsom, renowned builder architects of many 19th-century structures in California.

== Restaurant 301 ==
The Inn's restaurant, Restaurant 301, has a 3800 bottle collection of wine and has been "Grand Award" from Wine Spectator magazine since 1998. It is one of only 20 other restaurants in the world to have maintained the award for such a length of time. Reality show star Curtis Stone once served as the head chef.

== Architecture ==
The building is a replica of an earlier structure originally located in San Francisco. Murphy House was constructed as a large home in 1884 by the builder architects Samuel Newsom and Joseph Cather Newsom of the firm Newsom and Newsom. These 19th-century Victorian architects also built the Carson Mansion at virtually the same time in Eureka. However, the Murphy home was completely destroyed by the fire resulting from the 1906 San Francisco earthquake. Mark Carter found the blueprints for the home in an antique store and rebuilt the structure but in Eureka. The building was originally intended to be a private residence but, due to construction cost overruns, it was opened as a bed and breakfast to recoup the losses.

== See also ==
- Napa Valley Opera House: Another remaining example of Newsom and Newsom construction in California.
- San Dimas Hotel: A hotel designed by Newsom & Newsom in Southern California.
