= Berkeley Inn =

General information
- Location: 2501 Haste Street, Berkeley, United States
- Coordinates: 37.8662°N 122.2585°W
- Completed: 1911

Design and construction
- Architect: Joseph Cather Newsom

The Berkeley Inn was a hotel located at 2501 Haste Street in Berkeley, California, on the northeast corner of Haste Street and Telegraph Avenue. Designed by architect Joseph Cather Newsom and constructed in 1911, the building operated for nearly eight decades before being destroyed by fire and demolished in 1990. It was designated a City of Berkeley Landmark on November 9, 1987. The site remained vacant for more than thirty years after the building's demolition.

== History ==
=== Construction and early years ===
The Berkeley Inn was built in 1911 to the designs of Joseph Cather Newsom, a California architect of the Victorian era whose work included the Carson Mansion in Eureka and Berkeley's first City Hall. City of Berkeley landmark records also list a J. H. Hinds in connection with the building's design, though his precise role is not documented in surviving accounts. The building contained approximately 75 rooms and a restaurant that also served as a ballroom, making it one of the more substantial hotels on the avenue in its early years.

The restaurant closed around 1940, after which the building declined gradually from hotel to residential use. By the later decades of the twentieth century it had become a single room occupancy hotel serving low-income residents. It acquired the informal name "Heroin Hotel" among locals, a reference noted in a local history booklet, reflecting conditions on the surrounding block during the 1970s and 1980s.

=== Location ===
The inn stood at the northeast corner of Haste Street and Telegraph Avenue, adjacent to the northern boundary of People's Park. Directly across Haste Street, at 2500 Haste Street, stands the mural A People's History of Telegraph Avenue, painted in 1976 by a collective of artists and itself a designated City of Berkeley Landmark. During its years of operation the Berkeley Inn and the mural faced each other across the width of Haste Street.

=== Notable residents ===
The poet Julia Vinograd, known as the "Bubble Lady of Telegraph Avenue," lived at the Berkeley Inn for an extended period. Vinograd, who published more than seventy volumes of poetry over five decades while subsisting largely on SSI disability payments, kept the inn as her primary address for much of her time on Telegraph Avenue. She is depicted blowing soap bubbles in the mural across the street, painted six years after the 1969 People's Park confrontation in which she had participated while living at the inn.

=== Landmark designation and demolition ===
The Berkeley Inn was designated a City of Berkeley Landmark on November 9, 1987. The designation came despite the building's deteriorated condition. A fire in 1990 destroyed the structure, and it was demolished that year, only three years after receiving landmark status.

The City of Berkeley cleaned the site at public expense following the demolition but was unable to recover costs from the property owner, placing liens of approximately $500,000 against the land. Ken Sarachan purchased the vacant lot in 1994. Over the following two decades he put forward several development proposals, including a five-story structure with pagoda elements in 2006, none of which advanced to approval. The site stood empty for more than thirty years.

== In literature ==
Following the demolition of the Berkeley Inn, Julia Vinograd published Blues for the Berkeley Inn (1991, Zeitgeist Press), a poetry collection written in response to the building's loss.
