= Theodore Green Apothecary =

Historical building in San Francisco

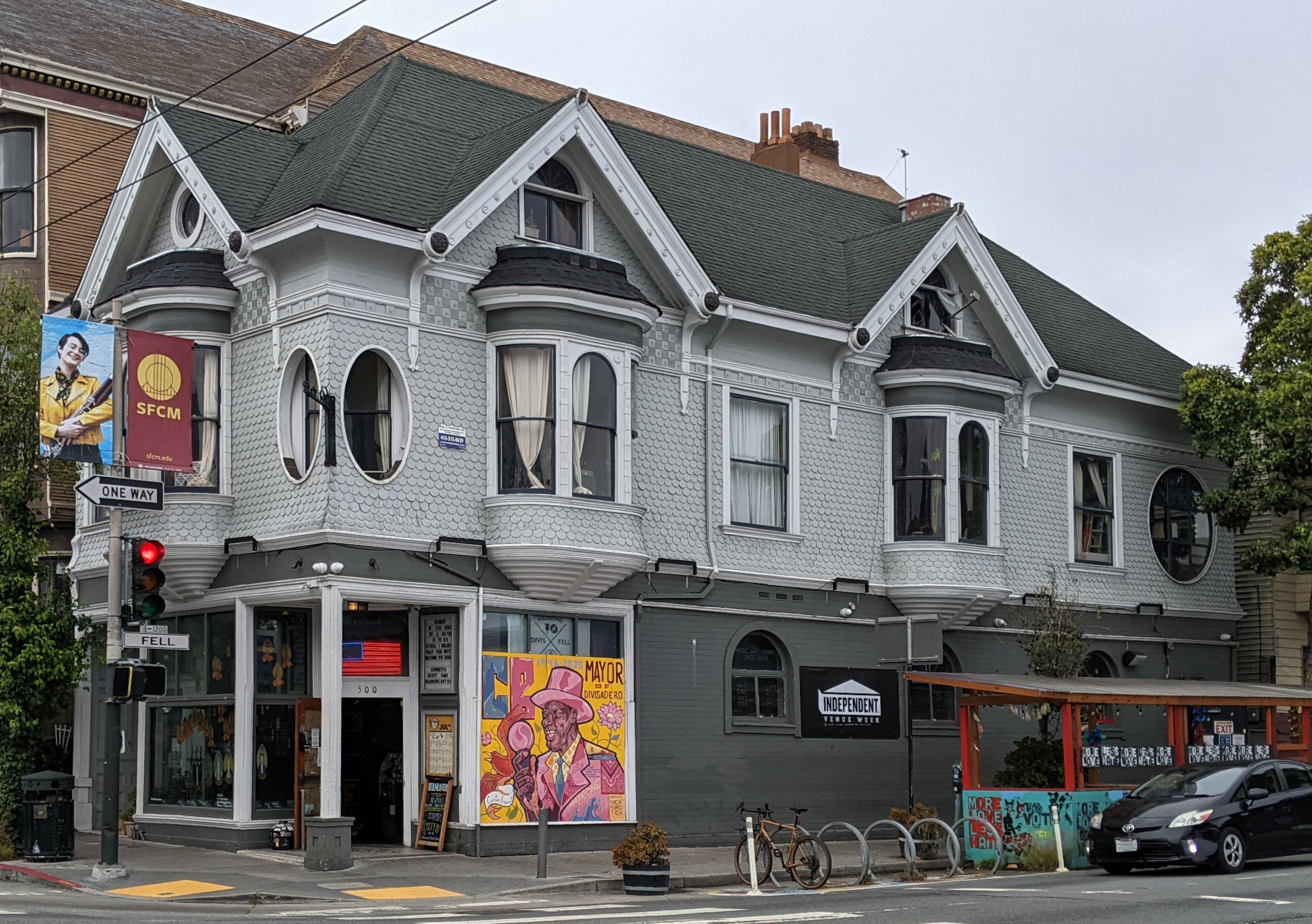
- The building in 2022

- Location in San Francisco County Location in California Location in United States
- 37.7742°N 122.4374°W
- Location: 500–502 Divisadero Street, San Francisco, California, U.S.

History
- Built: 1889

Site notes
- Architect: Samuel Newsom
- Architectural style: Queen Anne
- Governing body: Private

San Francisco Designated Landmark
- Designated: 7 September 1986
- Reference no.: 182

Theodore Green Apothecary, also known as Green's Pharmacy, is a historical building built in 1889, located at 500–502 Divisadero Street in San Francisco, California. It has been listed as a San Francisco Designated Landmark since 1986. As of 2022, the building operates as a privately owned bar.

== History ==
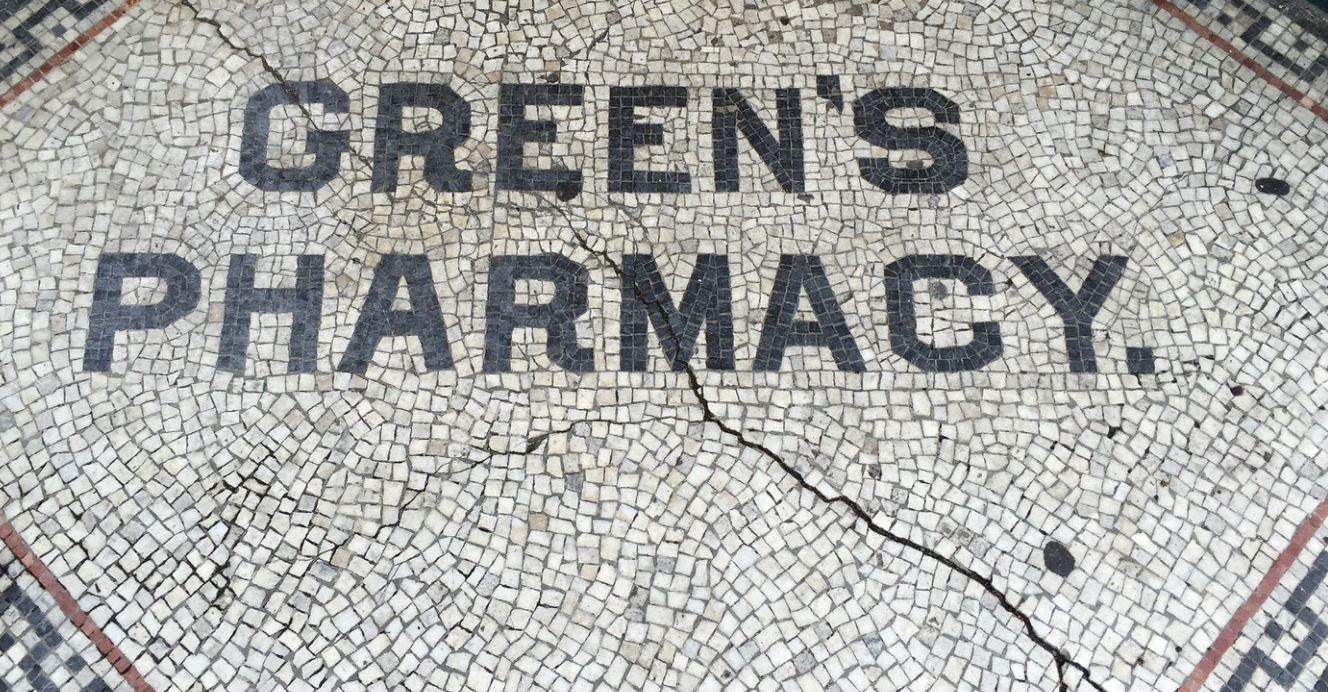
The entrance

The Theodore Green Apothecary was designed by architect Samuel Newsom, for pharmacist and educator Franklin Theodore Green (1863–1944). The architecture features rounded oriel windows, oval windows, and arched windows, juxtaposed with sharp gables in the roof.

This building is a rare example of an unaltered 19th-century storefront within the city of San Francisco.

== See also ==
- List of San Francisco Designated Landmarks
