= Lincoln Theater (Yountville, California) =

Napa Valley Performing Arts Center at Lincoln Theater
- Interactive map of Napa Valley Performing Arts Center at Lincoln Theater
- Address: 100 California Drive; Yountville, California; United States
- Coordinates: 38.394314°N 122.366152°W
- Operator: Lincoln Theater Foundation
- Capacity: 1,200
- Current use: Performing arts center

Construction
- Opened: 1957
- Reopened: 2005

Website
- lincolntheater.com

Lincoln Theater Napa Valley is in Yountville, on the grounds of the California Veterans Home in Napa County, California. The 1214-seat theater is the performance venue of the Napa Regional Dance Company and home of Symphony Napa Valley. Originally opened in 1957, it underwent a $20 million restoration which was completed in 2005. Robert Mondavi, his wife Margrit, Ron W. Miller and his wife Diane were among the primary benefactors of the restoration project. The State of California also provided $1.5 million in funding. Singer Dianne Reeves headlined the opening performance following the restoration on January 8, 2005. Napa Valley Performing Arts Center is centrally located on the 900-acre site of the nation's oldest Veteran's Home. In 2005 the community came together to upgrade and renovate this space, creating the largest venue in the Napa Valley with state of the art technical and performance capabilities. Napa Valley Performing Arts Center has faced challenges as well.

In August 2011, the theater's largest financial donor and key board member, Don Carr, was killed in an auto accident. The sudden loss of financial and leadership support, on the heels of the fiscal problems posed by the 2008 economic downturn, created a serious threat to the theater's long term viability. Within a few months, it became clear that the only way to ensure the health and vitality of the theater was to undergo a thorough strategic and financial restructuring process. The restructuring was a success. Within 11 months, the newly named Napa Valley Performing Arts Center at Lincoln Theater opened, debt free and with a new board, a stronger community focus, and a diversified donor base. The Performing Arts Center has since emerged as a leading provider of cultural programming and arts education in Napa County.

In response to the COVID-19 pandemic, the website announced that it was cancelling or postponing all events through the end of April 2020. There are no further updates as of May 2024.
