= Daughter of the Dragon (book) =

2023 non-fiction book by Yunte Huang

Daughter of the Dragon: Anna May Wong's Rendezvous with American History
- Author: Yunte Huang
- Publisher: Liveright Publishing Corporation
- Publication date: 2023
- Pages: 384
- ISBN: 978-1-631-49580-9

Daughter of the Dragon: Anna May Wong's Rendezvous with American History by Yunte Huang is a biography of American actress Anna May Wong. It was published in 2023 by Liveright Publishing Corporation.

== General references ==
- Gao, Yunxiang (1 January 2024). "'Daughter of the Dragon' by Yunte Huang review". History Today. Vol. 74, no. 1.
- Siler, Julia Flynn. "'Daughter of the Dragon' Review: The Star From Chinatown". Wall Street Journal.
- Szalai, Jennifer (23 August 2023). "The First Chinese American Movie Star and the Cost of Glittering Fame". The New York Times. ISSN 0362-4331.
- "Daughter of the Dragon". Kirkus Reviews. 2 May 2023.
