= Membership discrimination in California clubs =

Based on sex, race, religion, political views and social standing

Membership discrimination in California social clubs has been based on sex, race, religion, political views and social standing. In the late 1980s, a successful effort was made in many of the clubs to open up membership first to racial or religious minorities and then to women. Strictly private clubs that are not open to the public, and for which tax exemptions are not claimed, maintain their right to discriminate on the basis of gender or race, and all clubs can discriminate on the basis of social standing.

A state law against discriminating in the service of private businesses was gradually made applicable to social clubs that engaged in commercial activities. Rules against discrimination were also applied where clubs were the beneficiaries of government in any way, notably through taxes or subsidies.

== The first clubs ==
The Bohemian Club was founded in San Francisco in 1872 as a journalists' social group, but it grew to become a refuge for some of the most powerful men in American business and politics. The similarly august California Club was founded in Los Angeles in 1888 when "at least 12 of the 125 founding members were Jews." But "as the original Jewish members died off, this power center became off limits to Jews." The Jonathan Club, a likewise prestigious social group, was established in Los Angeles in 1894.

== Legislative measures ==
The Unruh Civil Rights Act, adopted in 1959, and as subsequently amended, outlaws discrimination based on age, ancestry, color, disability, national origin, race, religion, sex, sexual orientation and similar characteristics. The law applies to all businesses, including housing and public accommodations.

Section 125.6 of the state's Business and Professions Code, which took effect on January 1, 1976, threatened disciplinary action against "any holder of a state liquor license who discriminates on the basis of race, color, sex, religion, ancestry or national origin," but it specifically exempted private clubs with "discriminatory membership policy." The State Franchise Tax Board has forbidden business tax deductions for fees and expenses incurred at discriminatory private clubs.

Los Angeles Mayor Tom Bradley on May 28, 1987, signed a bill sponsored by Council Member Joy Picus to ban discrimination at most of the city's large private clubs, based on "sex, sexual orientation, race, color, religion, ancestry, national origin or disability." It applied to any club with more than 400 members that "takes payments for meetings attended by non-members."

In 1988, the U.S. Supreme Court ruled that cities may, in certain described cases, force large private clubs to admit minorities and women. It said that "clubs which serve meals and rent facilities to outsiders are more like business establishments than intimate social groups and therefore have no right to escape anti-discrimination laws."

== Significant changes for minority groups ==
=== 1960s ===
In 1965, the Jonathan Club was charged with "anti-Negro" and "anti-Jew" bias and a complaint was raised that the membership dues of Mayor Sam Yorty were being paid by city taxpayers to support such discrimination. Yorty told a news conference he knew nothing about such a circumstance.

The Anti-Defamation League of B'nai B'rith said that, in 1962, twelve of the "leading country clubs" and eight of the "most prestigious city clubs" in the Greater Los Angeles area were open only to Christians, but by 1969 those figures had dropped to eleven and five. Six of the city and country clubs that discriminated in 1969 were listed in Los Angeles, five in Pasadena, two in Glendale and one each in La Habra, Long Beach and Upland.

In July 1969, there were no Jewish members in the California Club but "at least one Jew" in the Jonathan Club, yet the latter club hadn't "taken in any Jewish members for at least two decades," Neil C. Sandberg regional director of the American Jewish Committee, told Jack Smith of the Los Angeles Times.

Smith wrote that a campaign had been going on for ten years to "quietly but unrelentingly" persuade "what has been called the 'last bastion' of anti-Semitism in America — the downtown men's clubs of the nation's big cities" to allow Jews to become members. Led by the American Jewish Committee, "with the active aid of the Antidefamation League, American Jewish Congress ... and other Jewish organizations," the campaign was successful in the case of the Stock Exchange Club, the University Club and the Chancery Club, but the Jonathan and the California clubs remained closed. The campaign was publicized upon the report of a seven-year study made at UCLA by Reed M. Powell, a sociologist.

=== 1970s ===
==== Examples of prejudice ====
In May 1975, a touring choir from the United States Air Force Academy decided not to give a proposed concert at the Jonathan Club because Academy officers had been informed that the club had a policy against hosting blacks.

Loretta Thompson-Glickman, member of the Pasadena city Board of Directors, recalled that when first elected to the board in 1977, she and Jo Heckman, the only other female director, had to enter the University Club in that city through a side door. Attorney Candis Ipswich said she applied for membership the same year and was rejected because "I was the wrong sex."

J. Peter Dunston, a Washington, D.C., businessman who was spending a year in Los Angeles, was "surprised" in February 1978 to find "how directly" the prejudices of the Jonathan Club were expressed when he applied for membership and was interviewed by the membership committee. He was told that "Jews and blacks were not welcome in the club." One of the committee members later "denied everything," but the other said, "We explained it to him in a different way. We didn't use the word discriminate. 'Invite' was the word."

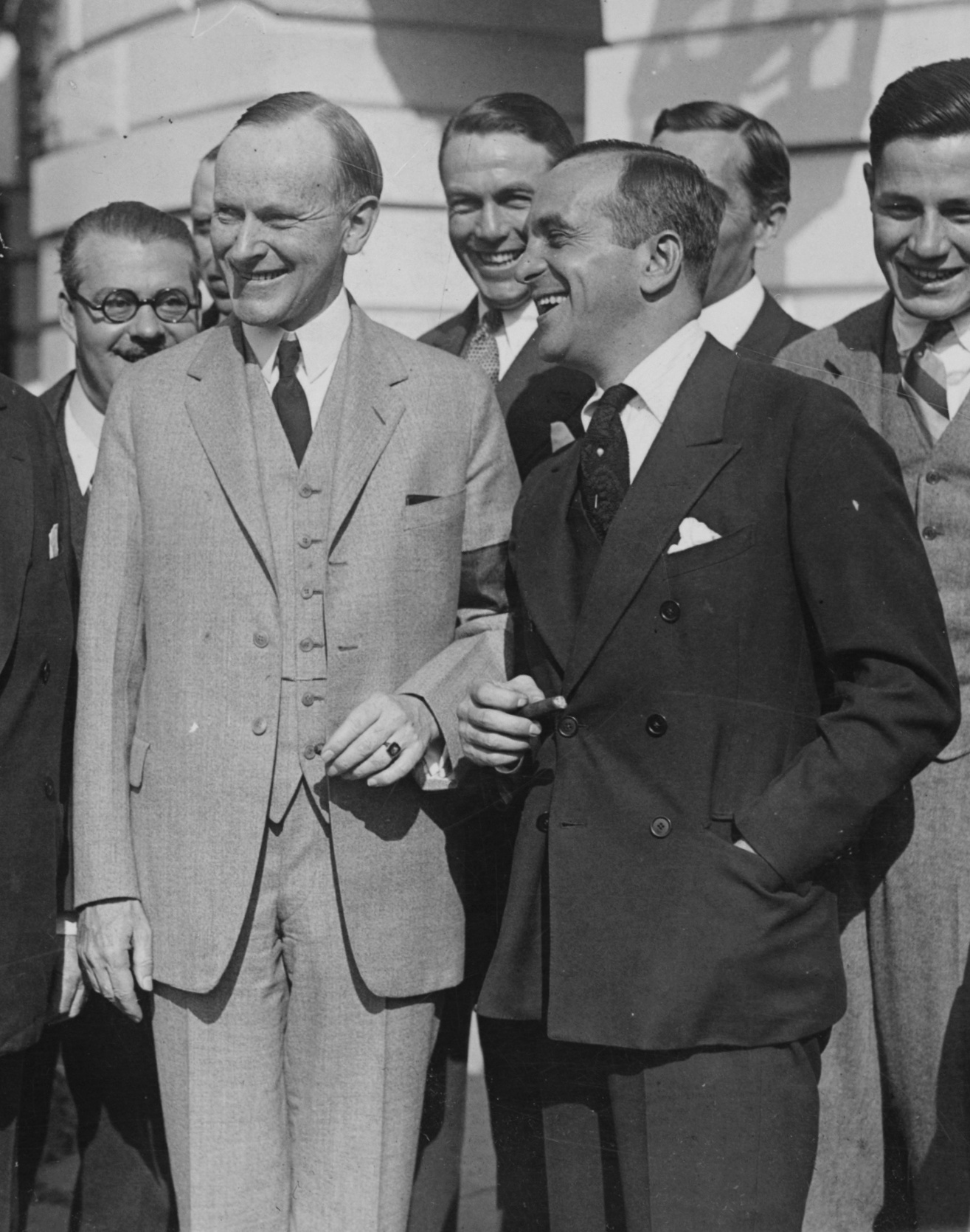
President Coolidge with actor Al Jolson at the Hillcrest Country Club in 1924

In 1978 there was still only one Jew in the Jonathan Club and none in the Los Angeles Country Club. The two clubs were known for their discrimination against Jews. Yet the Hillcrest Country Club in Beverly Hills was the "Jewish" counterpart to the Los Angeles Country Club, and Lew Wasserman, chairman of the board of the Music Corporation of America, told Times reporter Robert Scheer that the Hillcrest club "has consistently discriminated against non-Jewish members."

The Los Angeles Athletic Club had admitted blacks as members since the early 1960s, but it was discovered in 1975 that the club was admitting blacks "on a slower, more regulated basis than whites, in an effort not to offend or lose white men." The club quickly changed its policies after complaints were made.

Los Angeles bookseller Jake Zeitlin claimed in 1980 that many clubs, such as his city's Zamorano Club, an organization of bibliophiles, used a refusal to admit communists as a pretext for excluding Jews; he said he was denied admission for more than forty years under those circumstances.

Another example of membership discrimination is reverse discrimination, such as the many private clubs in California that exclude men. In San Francisco at least three private social clubs exist (the Francisca Club, the Town & Country Club and the Metropolitan Club) which do not allow men to become members. To date, there have been no pressure campaigns or threats of lawsuits to force women-only private clubs to begin admitting men as members. Many women-only clubs are experiencing declining memberships, while men-only clubs such as the Bohemian have decades-long waiting lists of would-be members.

==== Outside pressure ====
By 1976 some businesses were deciding not to reimburse executives for the dues they paid to clubs that discriminated against minorities. Wells Fargo Bank banned meetings at discriminatory clubs in October 1975, and Bank of America was also one of the first, announcing moreover that it would not itself maintain such memberships, nor would it sponsor events anywhere "unless all business guests who should attend can attend." Mayor Tom Bradley's office announced that he would no longer attend meetings at either the Jonathan or the California clubs. But a survey made by the Wall Street Journal in May 1976 "indicated that most companies felt any rules could be dodged," primarily by giving employees a salary increase instead of paying their club fees.

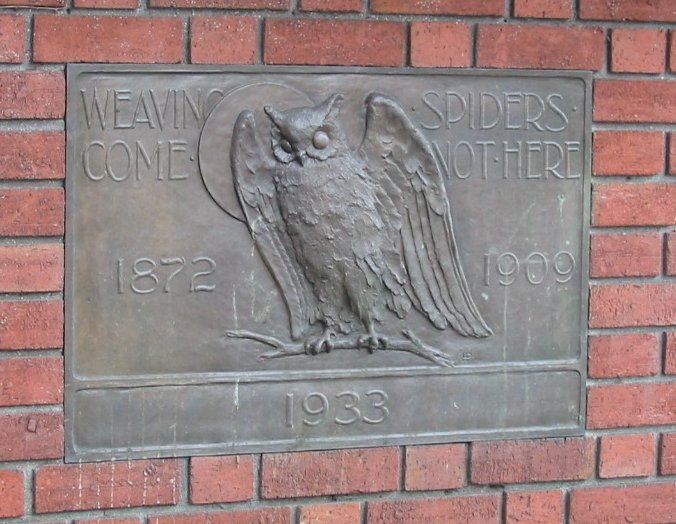
Bohemian Club owl

Responding to letters from the Jewish Federation Council, California Club president Luther Anderson wrote in September 1975 that the club "has no membership policy of any sort, and that individual decisions are made by an autonomous admissions committee over which the board of directors has no control." A year later, on October 1, 1976, the council mailed letters to top officials at 160 major corporations in Southern California, urging them not to hold meetings or functions at the California Club and to "reconsider" their policies of paying club membership dues for their executives.

In July 1978, the Los Angeles Times reported that Glenn Dumke, chancellor of the California State University system, belonged to the California Club and the Bohemian Club, while Paul F. Romberg, president of San Francisco State University, was a member of the Bohemian Club and Alistair W. McCrone, president of Humboldt State University, belonged to the Ingomar Club. Dumke and Romberg paid their membership fees with privately donated money, but McCrone used state money for his fees.

==== Policy changes ====
The Bohemian Club did make a push in 1970 for blacks to join up. Some, like Ernest J. Gaines, the first black person to be awarded a creative writing fellowship at Stanford University, declined to join because he was "just sort of tired of being the first to go into things," and he doubted he "would have found people with whom he could discuss [Ernest] Hemingway." Cecil Poole, who was a black federal appeals judge, also would not join.

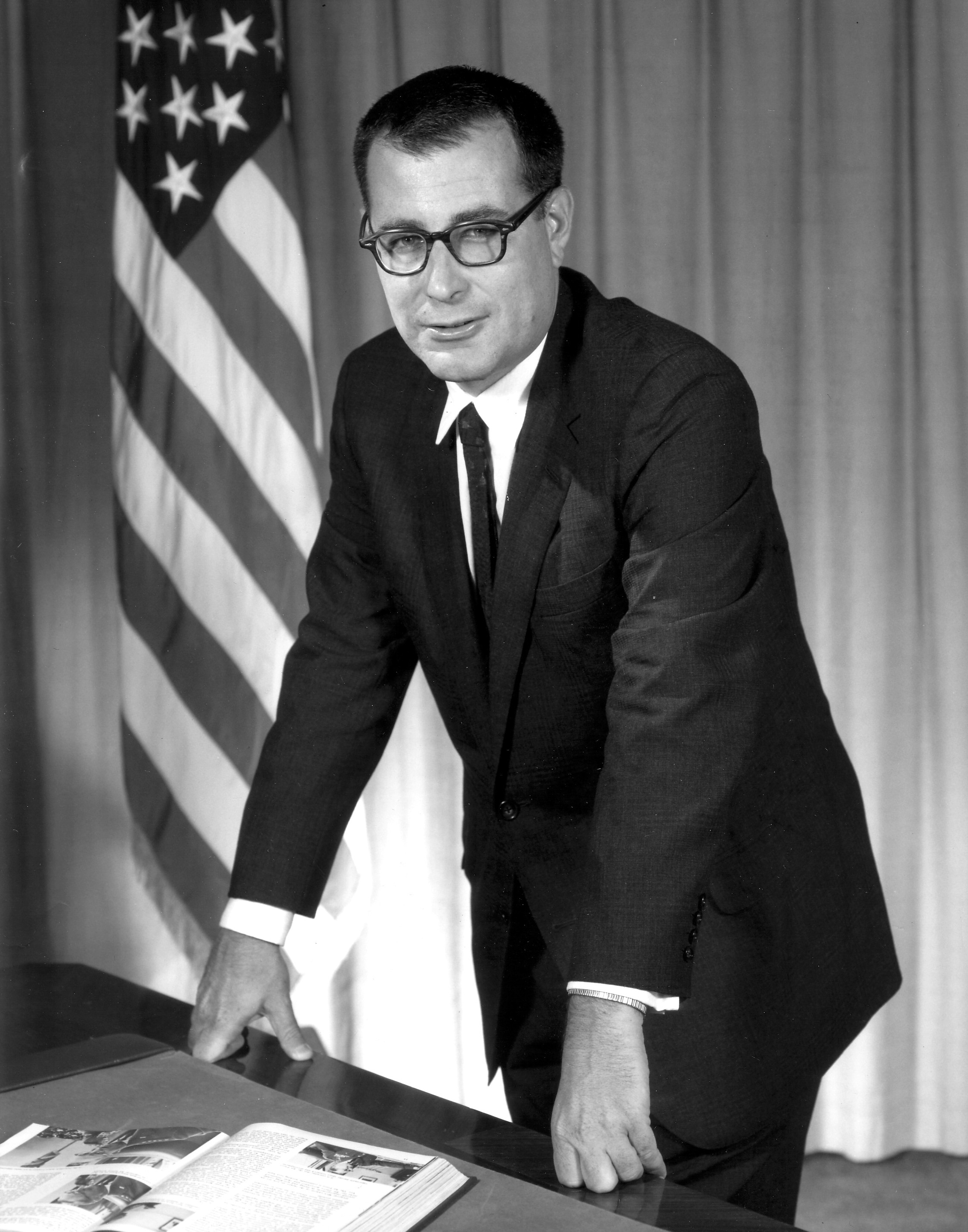
Harold Brown was admitted to the California Club in 1976.

In 1976 the California Club admitted a Jew, Harold Brown, the United States Secretary of Defense and former president of the California Institute of Technology, "several years after he was first nominated for membership" by Franklin David Murphy, chairman of the board of the Times-Mirror Company, and after "a protracted struggle among club members."

Jews were admitted to membership about 1966 in the Los Angeles Chancery Club, for attorneys, and in 1976 there was one black Chancery Club member — Sam Williams, president-elect of the County Bar Association.

Warner Heineman, vice chairman of Union Bank, who was Jewish, was admitted to membership in the Jonathan Club in October 1977. He said the action was "something of a breakthrough. ... I personally feel I am a whole citizen now. I can't explain what it means for someone who was persecuted in Germany to still be denied membership in a club of his peers. ... I feel emancipated." Jonathan Club president Robert Brimberry said in February 1978 that "In recent years certain restrictions have been changing. ... we are accepting and considering all applications on their merit, including those of minorities and women."

Also in fall 1977, two Jewish men were admitted as members of the Los Angeles Country Club—Sherrill Corwin, head of the Metropolitan Theaters chain, and Si Ramo, an executive at TRW Inc.

=== 1980s ===
The membership of William French Smith, President Ronald Reagan's choice for U.S. attorney-general in the discriminatory California and Bohemian clubs became an issue for him before Smith's nomination was approved by the Senate in January 1981.

In 1987 the Board of Governors of the State Bar of California voted to ban from participating in the annual Conference of Delegates any local bar association that patronized any private discriminatory club which excluded people from membership or use of its facilities because of their "race, color, creed, national ancestry, sex or sexual preference." Other controversies in the 1980s included those in:

==== Avalon ====
In November 1988, Avalon city officials on Santa Catalina Island asked the city attorney to investigate the all-male Tuna Club after City Council Member Irene Strobel said she had " twice accepted invitations to visit the club in her role as a council member, but she refused to enter by the side or back doors that women are supposed to use. Instead, she went through the front door."

After "months of inquiry," city officials agreed that the Tuna Club did not discriminate against women. A March 14 letter from the club said it "does not and will not discriminate ... on the basis of sex, race, religion and national origin." The club, founded in 1898, leased its facilities from the city.

==== Los Angeles ====
In 1982, the city's Community Redevelopment Agency "barred its employees from conducting any business" at the Jonathan Club, and law firms, banks and government agencies adopted policies boycotting the club.

In October of the same year, Prince Philip of Great Britain, on a visit to Los Angeles to inspect equestrian sites for the 1984 Olympics, turned down an invitation to an evening at the California Club when he discovered that his host, Mayor Tom Bradley, refused to attend because the club "prohibits women and has no black members."

On May 28, 1986, Lodwrick M. Cook, chief executive officer of the oil giant Arco, sent a memo announcing that the firm would no longer reimburse executives for memberships in "discriminatory private clubs." The order affected "about 30" people who belonged to the California and Jonathan clubs in Los Angeles and the Dallas Petroleum Club.

Hillcrest Country Club president Mark B. Levey said in April 1987 that the club had taken steps to recruit non-Jewish members and had "about two dozen" at that time.

In February 1988, the California Club admitted its first black member in the person of Joseph L. Alexander, 58-year-old surgeon and former Army colonel. The club also approved Ivan J. Houston, the chief executive officer of the predominantly black Golden State Mutual Life Insurance Company. A "number of Jews" were said to have been admitted in recent years as well.

==== Santa Monica ====
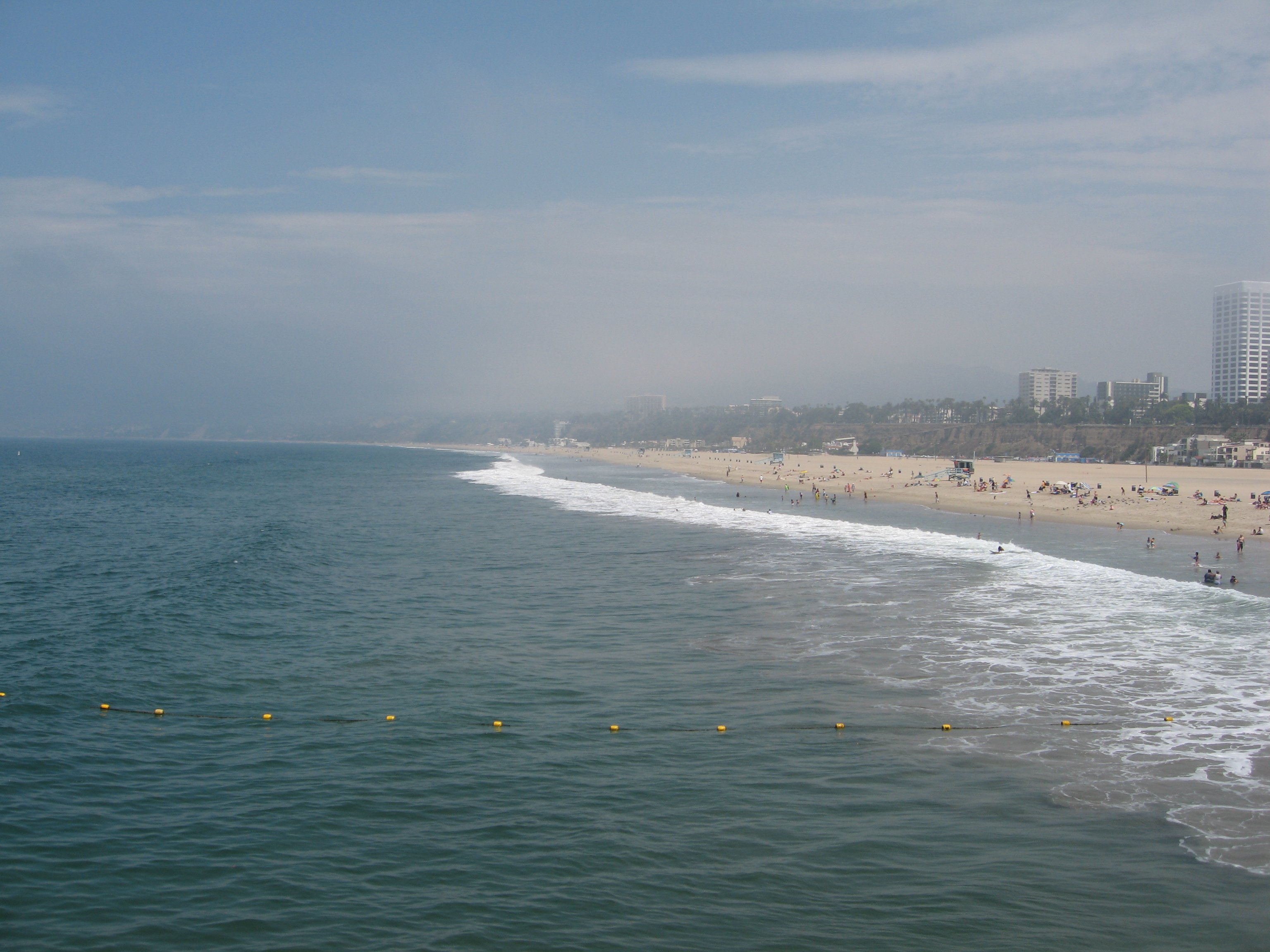
Santa Monica Beach

At the beginning of 1985, the Santa Monica Planning Commission "grudgingly approved" a permit from the Jonathan Club to expand the club's facilities on the Santa Monica beach. The council also voted to send a letter to the state's Coastal Commission stating that the club's membership policies might affect "the public's right to beach access." "Previous councils had refused to act on the matter because of the club's alleged discriminatory policies ... Councilwoman Cheryl Rhoden told a club official 'not one grain of sand' would be given to the club until it changed its membership policies." On July 25, 1985, the Coastal Commission did order the club to adopt nondiscriminatory policies before it could expand its recreational use onto state-owned beach property.

The decision was upheld by the state Supreme Court in May 1988 even though the Jonathan Club had said that it did not bar women or minorities as members.

== Women ==
In March 1986, the Rotary clubs' federation Rotary International was ordered by a state appellate court to reinstate the Rotary Club of Duarte it had ousted in 1983 for admitting three women members, and three years later the University Club in Pasadena decided also to admit women. The all-male club had voted against the idea twice before — in 1977 and 1980.

John M. Robinson, president of the California State Club Association, wrote in a 1987 newsletter that "Clubs are under broad attack nationwide." He said:

The proponents of anti-club measures consist principally of a relatively small group of strident professional women in metropolitan centers, the anti-Establishment news media, vote-seeking politicians, a few minority leaders, do-gooders, the radical left, and social engineers who would restructure our social system according to their own ideas. ,,, the essence of a club is its exclusiveness. Unless the right to select desired members and to exclude unwanted members is unrestricted, the objective of compatibility and congeniality of members cannot be accomplished. The right thus to select and exclude necessarily includes the right to discriminate on any basis whatsoever. An organization to which everyone has the right to belong ceases to be a club in the traditional sense."

=== Beverly Hills ===
The Friars Club, a 700-member club consisting mostly of people in show business or the movies, had four women members by February 1988, including attorney Gloria Allred, who in that month engaged in a "very heated meeting" with club officials over her demand that women be allowed to use the health facilities of the club. Kenneth Reich of the Los Angeles Times wrote that:

The Friars Club dispute is uncommon only in that it involves one of the nation's most celebrated exponents of women's rights. Dispute over the new — if less well-known — members of such facilities as dining rooms, golf courses and health clubs has also marked the integration of other clubs in Los Angeles and elsewhere.

=== Eureka ===
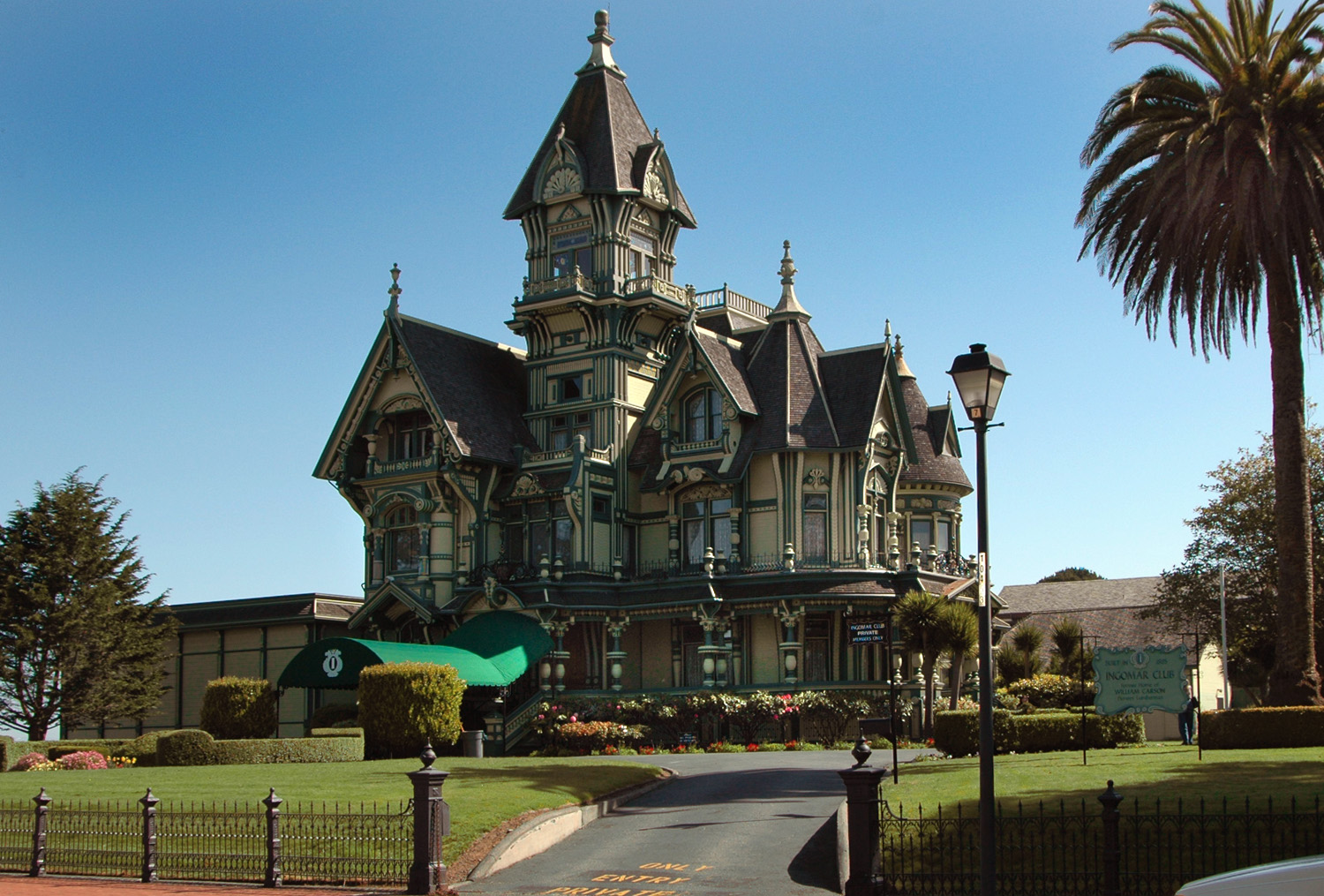
Carson Mansion

In 1974, Ellen Stern Harris, vice chairman of the California Coastal Commission, was not allowed to join her fellow commissioners for an informal tour of the Carson Mansion in Eureka because the private Ingomar Club, housed there, admitted women "only on specified days." The state attorney-general's office filed suit against the club in July 1974 after the Ingomar board of directors decided not to change the rule. It was settled in early 1978 with the club agreeing that women have the right to enter "for any business, civic or political function." It did not involve membership, though, "since state law does not prevent a private social club from barring members on the grounds of sex, religion or race." The club now admits women with equal access as men.

=== Los Angeles ===
In 1975 "neither the Los Angeles Country Club nor any other major country club" had changed "the traditional policy that bans single women as full members, and limits all women to specific starting times on the golf course.

==== Brentwood Country Club ====
The city sued the Brentwood Country Club in August 1987 to force it to stop barring women from its "Men's Grill" and golf course during part of the day. It dropped the suit when the club agreed "to admit women to the restaurant at all hours and make the rules less restrictive to women golfers."

==== California Club ====
In June 1987 the California Club took a vote on changing its bylaws and decided by a 4-1 margin to admit women. Club president Donald E. Butler said the decision was made by "a group of rational individuals trying to do the right thing." In response to a vociferous campaign by the losers, the club scheduled another vote on the same issue, and in March 1988, the regular members voted 728 to 297 to accept women members. In a separate category of non-resident members, the vote was 149 to 38.

The first new members admitted under the new policy were E. Camron Cooper, senior vice president and treasurer of the Atlantic Richfield Company, and Linda Hartwick, a partner in the Korn/Ferry International executive-search firm.

==== Hillcrest Country Club ====
The Hillcrest Country Club changed its bylaws in April 1987 to provide for women as members and to allow daughters and wives, as well as sons, to inherit the memberships of deceased members.

==== Jonathan Club ====
Women guests were "limited to certain floors, dining rooms and entrances" but they "can now use the main elevator and lobby" at the Jonathan Club, a member told the Times in 1976, adding that "We no longer have a women's elevator." In 1977 the Jonathan Club "voted overwhelmingly" to admit women to membership. But Betty Bryant Morris, associate counsel at Union Bank, found treatment of her membership application "raised suspicions among some that the club has no real intention" of taking a woman as a member. Directors at first wanted to delay her nomination for one year, but, after pressure, they changed their mind and sent Morris's application to the membership committee.

By 1988, however, "about a dozen women" had joined the club, one of whom was Brooke Knapp, an aviator who was the first pilot to circle the Earth at the poles in a private jet, but they were forbidden to enter the men's library, grill and bar. The city attorney in January of that year was preparing a suit against the club to end that practice. Knapp said she opposed the suit because it might "engender a backlash that will slow women's progress." Club attorney John R. Shiner said in June 1989 that the Jonathan would thenceforth serve women in the bar and grill, "no questions asked."

==== University Club ====
The University Club had been in the forefront of taking in blacks and Jews as members, and another breakthrough came in February 1975, when it became the first major downtown Los Angeles club to admit women. As late as 1976, though, it required "unaccompanied women guests" to wait in a "ladies' lounge ... and before 5 p.m. [they] must enter and leave the club through a specified door."

=== Newport Beach ===
In February 1989, twenty-five of the ninety single women belonging to the Newport Beach Country Club sued, alleging that they had to pay $8,500 more for memberships than single men. Gloria Allred was their attorney.

=== San Francisco ===
==== Bohemian Club ====
Two state Assembly members, women lawyers' groups and a law firm called on the state Alcoholic Beverage Control Commission in July 1987 to revoke the liquor license of the Bohemian Club because it excluded members on the basis of race or sex. In the meantime, the city of San Francisco had passed an ordinance "aimed at forcing the 115-year-old club to admit women." A Superior Court judge declined to overturn it, but the club continued to insist that "since the club does not accept money from outside businesses, it is not subject to the court ruling." It fought bitterly, and successfully, to keep from admitting women as members. Women, including political office holders, "must enter via a side door and stay in the downstairs banquet rooms." Dan Morain of the Los Angeles Times wrote:

A few men have quit, some will not join and some groups no longer use it for social functions. The U.S. 9th Circuit Court of Appeals, for one, quietly stopped holding its annual party there in 1979 after several judges, including a black, a Jew and a few women appointed by President Jimmy Carter, protested that it was a symbol of discrimination . . .

When Gloria Allred asked former California Governor Pat Brown for a membership application for the Bohemian Club, "I turned her down," he said. "I think she's a fine lawyer, but there are a lot of women's clubs she could join where they talk about sewing and raising babies." Former U.S. Senator S.I. Hayakawa said women should not be allowed to join for the same reason he didn't "want to go to women's clubs and join a sewing circle, or a ladies' bridge club."

The Olympic Club, which had been male-only for the first 130 years since its founding, relented to pressure and the threat of lawsuits, and opened membership to women in 1990. Likewise the Pacific-Union Club, formed in 1889, was male-only for more than a century before it too began allowing women a limited form of membership due to external pressure.

=== Yorba Linda ===
Jan Bradshaw, an interior designer, sued the Yorba Linda Country Club in 1988 when she discovered that women could play golf only in the afternoons. On Sundays, there was only a single time for women's play "I've received death threats on the phone and nasty, anonymous letters," she said. Gina Walthall, president of the women's board of directors, said that Bradshaw's suit "would ruin it for everyone else so we'll just have an open tee-time. And then you might as well belong to a public course." Bradshaw was represented by Gloria Allred.

== See also ==
- Jewish country club
