= Julia Flynn Siler =

American journalist and nonfiction author

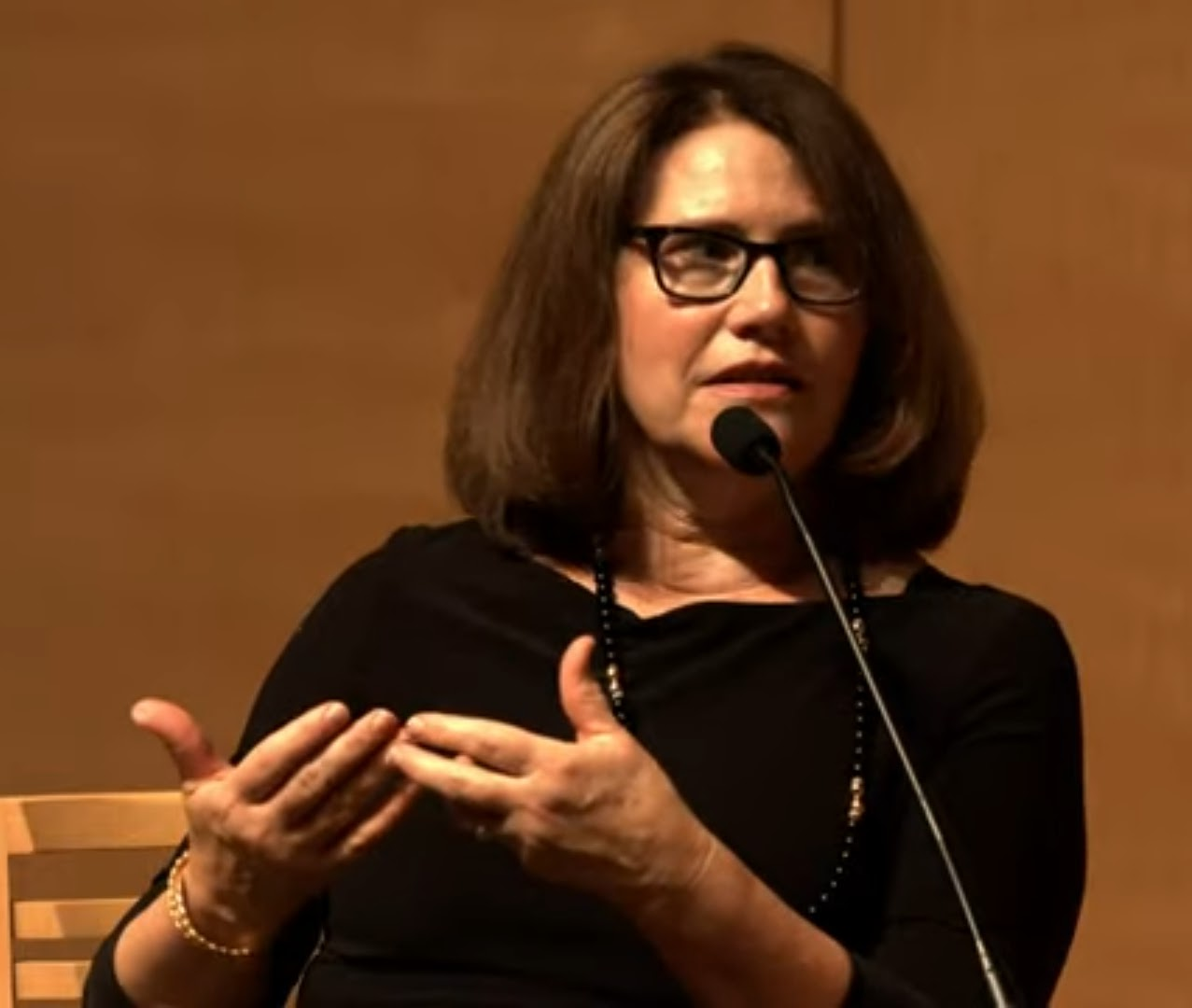
- Born: Palo Alto, California
- Occupations: Journalist; Author
- Spouse: Charles (Charlie) Siler
- Writing career
- Notable works: House of Mondavi; Lost Kingdom
- Website: juliaflynnsiler.com

Julia Flynn Siler is an American author and journalist. She has written nonfiction books and contributed long-form journalism and literary travel writing to publications including The New York Times, The Wall Street Journal, and National Geographic. Her books include The House of Mondavi, Lost Kingdom, and The White Devil’s Daughters.

In 2025, Siler delivered a TEDx talk titled Singing Together, which addressed group choral singing. Beginning in 2026, she is scheduled to direct the Jeniam Conversations literary series at the Oxford Centre for Life-Writing at Wolfson College, University of Oxford. She serves as the Nonfiction Director of the Community of Writers in California.

== Early life and career ==
Siler was born in Palo Alto, California in 1960. She grew up in the San Francisco Bay Area and received a bachelor's degree in American Studies from Brown University in 1982, a master's from Columbia University's Graduate School of Journalism in 1985, and an M.B.A. from Northwestern University's Kellogg Graduate School of Management in 1991. While on assignment in London for BusinessWeek magazine, she did additional postgraduate work at the London School of Economics. She was a staff correspondent for BusinessWeek magazine in Los Angeles, Chicago, and London, and a staff writer for The Wall Street Journal in London. She has been a longtime contributor to The Wall Street Journal from the San Francisco Bay Area.

== The House of Mondavi ==
In 2004, Siler wrote a front-page article for The Wall Street Journal titled "Inside a Napa Valley Empire, a Family Struggles With Itself" about how brothers Robert and Peter Mondavi's past battles imperiled the Robert Mondavi wine empire in California. In 2007, Siler published The House of Mondavi: The Rise and Fall of an American Wine Dynasty, a nonfiction account of four generations of the Mondavi family. The House of Mondavi concerns a repeating pattern of sibling conflict in a family wine business. The book details the 2004 board coup that led to the breakup and the forced sale of the publicly traded Robert Mondavi company. The House of Mondavi revealed that patriarch Robert Mondavi's philanthropic gifts to the University of California at Davis and elsewhere had led to a personal financial crisis for the company, which was one of the factors leading to its $1 billion takeover.

The book was a finalist for a Gerald Loeb Award for distinguished business and financial journalism in the category of business books in 2008. It was also a James Beard Foundation finalist that year in the category of books on wine and spirits. BusinessWeek picked it as one of the top ten business books of the year for 2007. New York Times wine writer Eric Asimov wrote about it: “Call it Greek tragedy or Shakespearean drama, Biblical strife, Freudian acting out or even soap opera. You wouldn’t be exaggerating, and you wouldn’t be wrong." It also received criticism for focusing on the salacious.

== Lost Kingdom ==
In 2011, Siler published Lost Kingdom: Hawaii's Last Queen, the Sugar Kings, and America's First Imperial Adventure, a narrative history of the overthrow of Hawaii's Queen Liliuokalani. Lost Kingdom was a 2011 Northern California bestseller. It was also a New York Times bestseller. In Fortune magazine, Nin-Hai Tseng wrote “The story of an island grappling to hold onto traditions in the face of burgeoning capitalist powers... Siler gives us a riveting and intimate look at the rise and tragic fall of Hawaii’s royal family."

== The White Devil's Daughters ==
In May 2019, Alfred A. Knopf, a Penguin Random House imprint, published The White Devil’s Daughters: The Women Who Fought Slavery in San Francisco’s Chinatown, a narrative history of the trafficking of Asian girls and women that flourished in the West during the first hundred years of Chinese immigration. The book focuses on San Francisco’s Occidental Mission Home, a “safe house” that opened in 1874 for enslaved and vulnerable Chinese women and girls. The book also shines a light on Donaldina (Dolly) Cameron, who rescued more than 60 mostly Chinese girls, women and babies to a shelter in San Anselmo.

Siler “vividly recounts a shocking episode from America’s past in this gripping history,” wrote Publishers Weekly. "It will fascinate readers interested in the history of women, immigration, and racism.” In its starred review, Kirkus Reviews called The White Devil's Daughters "An accessible, well-written, riveting tale of a dismal, little-known corner of American history." The White Devil's Daughters was selected as an Editors' Choice pick by the New York Times Book Review. The Commonwealth Club of California named The White Devil's Daughters as a finalist for a 2019 California Book Award, and The California Independent Bookseller Alliance granted 2019 "Golden Poppy" awards to The White Devil's Daughters in the non-fiction and regional categories.

== Other work ==
In addition to her books and long-form journalism, Siler has written travel features for The Wall Street Journal, including “A Walking Tour Worthy of a Jane Austen Novel” and “A Scottish Scare: Visiting the Scotland That Inspired Mary Shelley’s Frankenstein.”

She has also contributed reported essays to National Geographic on subjects including rowing and health, religion and happiness, and human flourishing.

In 2025, Siler delivered a TEDx talk titled Singing Together, which discusses group singing in relation to health, social connection, and spirituality.

Beginning in 2026, Siler is scheduled to direct the Jeniam Conversations literary series at the Oxford Centre for Life-Writing at Wolfson College, University of Oxford. She also serves as Nonfiction Director of the Community of Writers.
