= Ingomar Club =

Social Club in Eureka, California

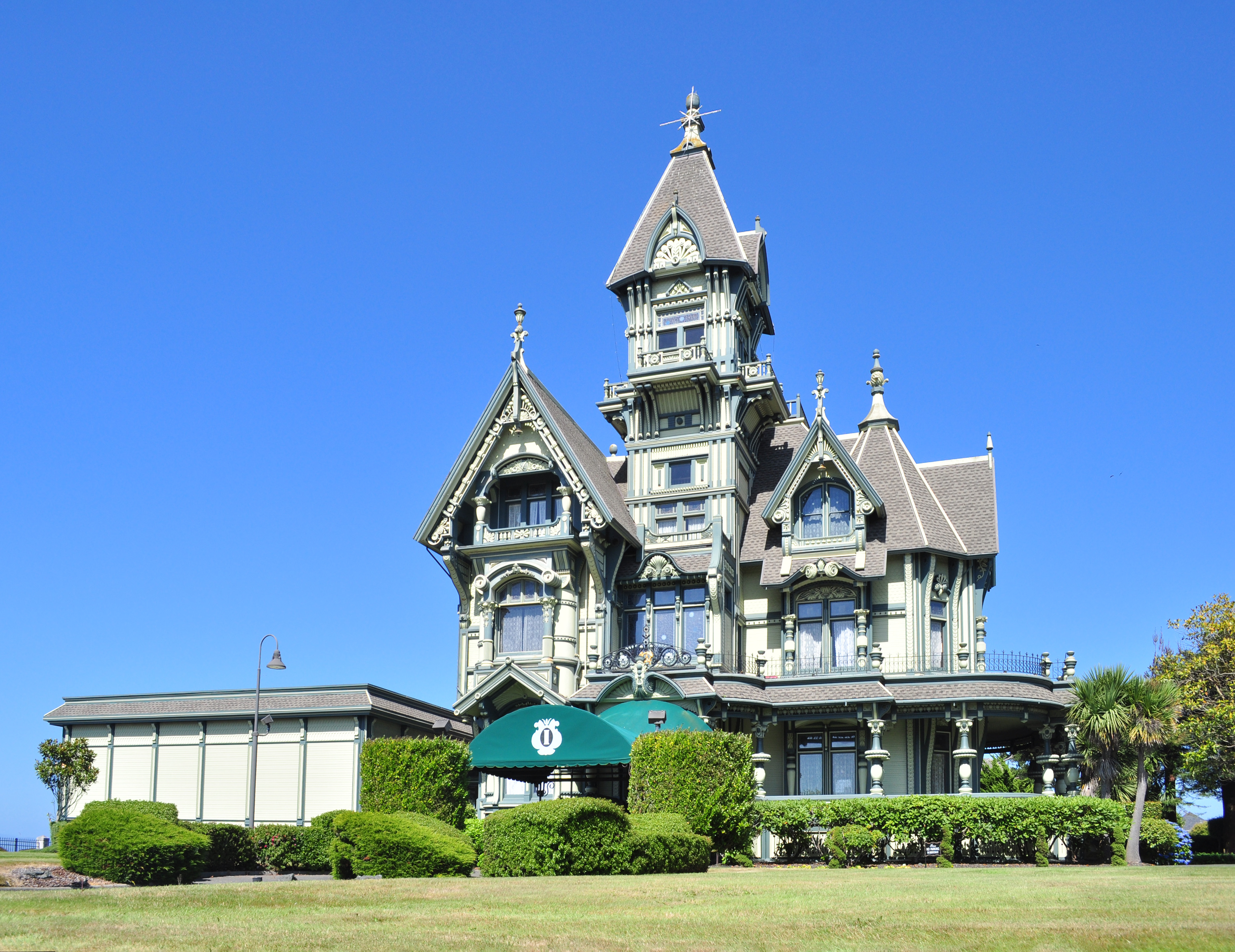
- Named after: The play, Ingomar the Barbarian
- Formation: 1950
- Founder: J.H. Crothers and Carl Gustafson
- Legal status: Private social club
- Purpose: Social; Preservation of the Carson Mansion
- Location: Eureka, California, United States
- Affiliations: International Associate Clubs
- Website: https://www.ingomar.org/

The Ingomar Club is a private club that owns and is based in the historic Carson Mansion in Eureka, California, one of the most notable examples of Victorian architecture in the United States. According to researcher Wally Graves, the club was founded "to own and maintain a club headquarters for the meetings and enjoyment of its members; to create, establish and maintain an association of gentlemen for the preservation and protection of historic 'Carson Mansion'; to promote interest among its members in athletics, yachting, golf, swimming and related activities; to promote good fellowship, and to associate together those interested in the field of fine arts, music and culture" More recently, the club defines its mission as one of maintaining the historic home while providing dining and social outlets for its members.

The club is a member of the International Associate Clubs and participates in reciprocal agreements with member clubs.

It operates under laws for 501(c)(7) Social and Recreation Clubs. In 2024 it claimed total revenue of $2,516,347 and total assets of $2,908,217.

== History ==
=== Formation of the club and the early years ===
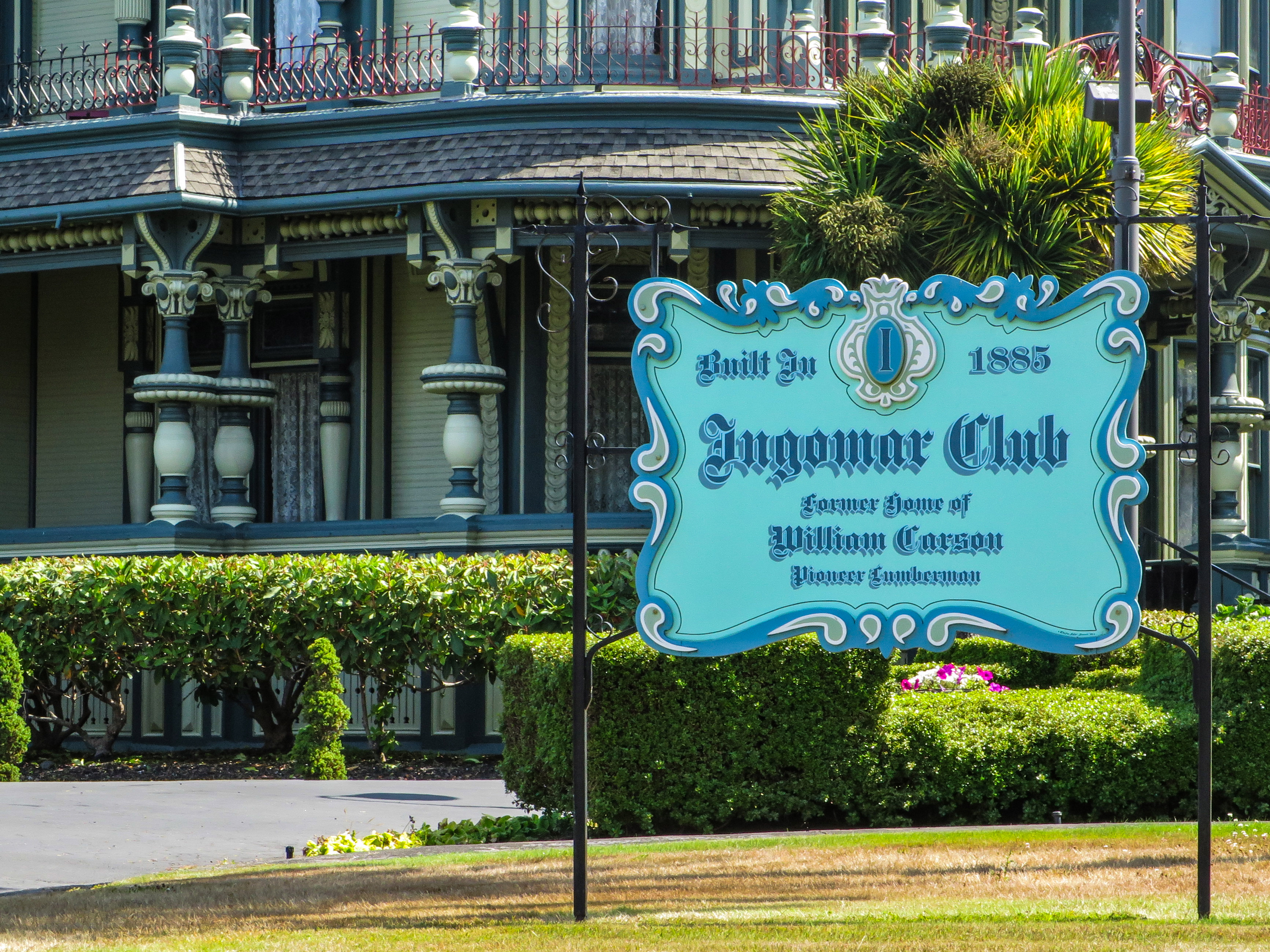
The club's sign in 2018 with the mansion in the background

In the late 1940s, two Eureka businessmen, J. H. Crothers and Carl Gustafson, came up with the idea for what is now the Ingomar Club. Modeling their vision after an established organization, the Humboldt Club, they and other prominent members of local society began meeting and looking for a physical location to house the club. In particular, they focused on a vacant mansion that had been built by lumber baron William Carson, who had been a member of the Humboldt Club. Since his heirs had moved to San Francisco, the club founders were able to negotiate a price of $35,000.

The Ingomar Club incorporated in May 1950, taking as its name after Carson's Ingomar Theater, itself named for Carson's favorite play, Ingomar the Barbarian, written by Maria Ann Lovell. Once the purchase of the Carson Mansion had been finalized, members hired staff to begin a conversion process to convert the kitchen area to commercial grade and to upgrade the house for heavy use by members. Additionally, club members determined to add a large, new section, spending considerable money in the process.

When the house was changed from use as a private residence to a private club, elements and remodeling occurred that led to minor changes in the internal layout of the house to allow for offices and dining areas to replace living areas. The house was spared massive redesign, however, because the club built a large addition to the north elevation (bay side) to be the site of the large bar, dining room, and meeting facility needed for member functions.

Originally a men's club, the club has since admitted women with equal access as men.

=== Restoration of the building ===
In 1988, the organization management began a restoration process that made significant progress in restoring aspects of the house back to the days of its original owner. After the 1992 Cape Mendocino earthquakes, the house suffered damage as it did in 1932, requiring the club to add a surcharge to member dues to complete significant repair and restoration work.

=== Lawsuits ===
In 1974, Ellen Stern Harris, vice chairman of the California Coastal Commission, was not allowed to join her fellow commissioners for an informal tour of the Carson Mansion because the Ingomar Club admitted women "only on specified days." The state attorney general's office filed suit against the club in July 1974 after the Ingomar board of directors decided not to change the rule. It was settled in early 1978 with the club agreeing that women have the right to enter "for any business, civic or political function." It did not involve membership, though, "since state law does not prevent a private social club from barring members on the grounds of sex, religion or race." As mentioned, however, the Ingomar Club has since admitted female members.

In 2011 and in 2018, there were sexual harassment lawsuits related to the club.

== See also ==
- List of American gentlemen's clubs
- Membership discrimination in California social clubs
