= Samuel Newsom =

Canadian-American architect (1852–1908)

- Born: March 1852; Montreal, Canada
- Died: September 1, 1908 (aged 56); San Francisco, California, United States
- Occupation: Architect
- Spouse: Matilda Gertrude “Tillie” Wilcox (m.1875–death 1898)
- Children: 6

Samuel Newsom (1852 – 1908) was a Canadian-born American architect. Together with his brother Joseph Cather Newsom founded the architecture firm Newsom and Newsom (or the Newsom Brothers), practicing in Northern and Southern California. Their most celebrated house is the Carson Mansion in Eureka, California.

== Early life ==
Samuel Newsom was born April 5, 1852, in Canada, in Montreal. His parents were Jessie Livingstone (1821–1882) and Levens Mathewson Newsom (or Newsome, 1815–1897). He had 11 siblings. His father Levens worked at a plant nursery. In 1860, Samuel Newsom immigrated to San Francisco. His two older brothers Thomas Newsom and John Newsom were also architects and taught Samuel and Joseph. Neither brother had formal education in architecture.

== Career ==
In 1877, the Newsom brothers, Samuel and Joseph Cather Newsom maintained their architectural office (for Newsom and Newsom) at 321 California Street in San Francisco in 1877, followed by an office at 504 Kearny Street in San Francisco in 1883, and then in Oakland by 1884. By 1886, they had a Los Angeles office, which was run by Joseph. The brothers specialized in designing Queen Anne style architecture homes with extravagant details, designed for the common home buyer. Many of their clients were middle class. Newsom and Newsom constructed of many of the Eastlake style and Queen Anne style homes in San Francisco, California and the surrounding areas. They built around 650 buildings which included single family homes, two family homes, flats, apartments and hotels. The Newsom brothers published pattern books on the different decorative styles. By 1893, the firm had made a change and was designing in a Mission Revival style and in 1906 they were designing Craftsmen style homes. Joseph Cather Newsom ended his relationship to the firm in 1888 but continued to practice architecture alone in Los Angeles.

From c.1898 until 1901, Samuel Newsom worked with Frederick Herman Meyer to form the firm Newsom and Meyer in Oakland.

His two sons joined the firm, Sidney Newsom in 1893, and Noble Newsom in 1906.

== Personal life ==
In 1875, Newsom married Canadian Matilda Gertrude “Tillie” (née Wilcox) in Alameda County. Together they had 6 children; Sidney Newsom, Samuel Newsom Jr., Helen Newsom Tufts, Ruby Newsom Van Sickle, Noble Newsom, and Harold Newsom.

== Projects ==
=== Newsom and Newsom (1877–1888) ===
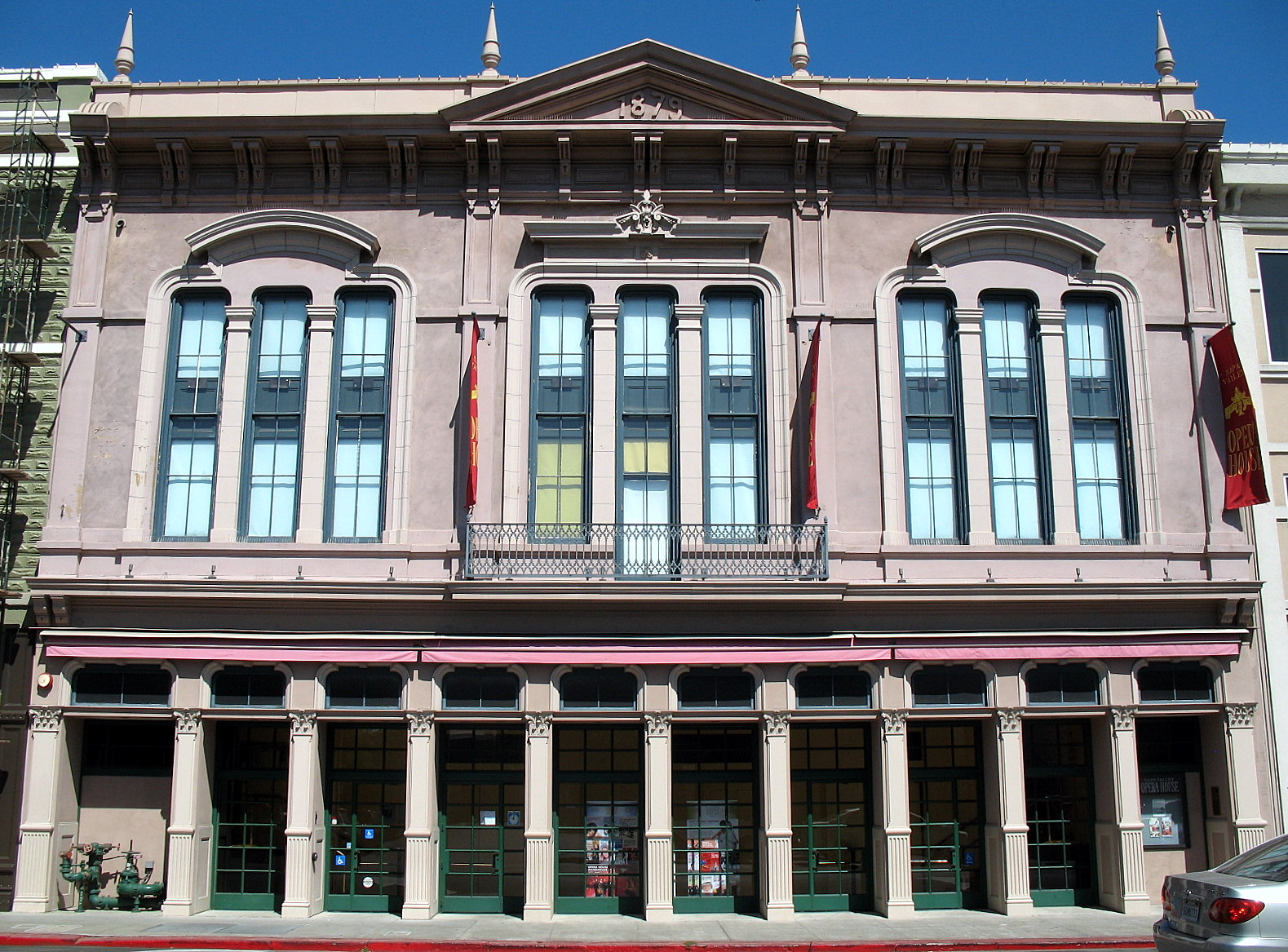
Napa Valley Opera House (1878), in Napa, California built by Newsom and Newsom

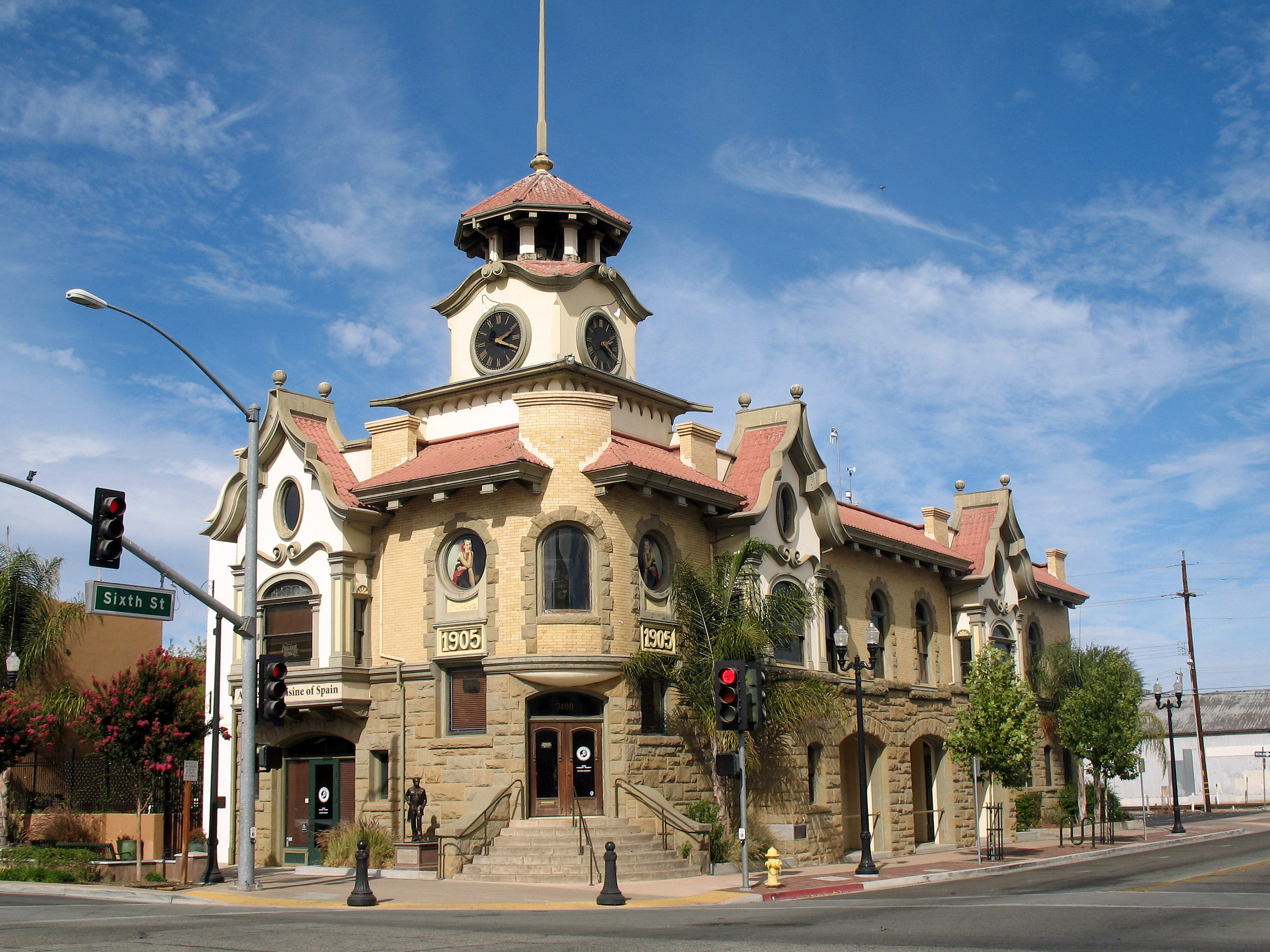
Old City Hall (1905), in Gilroy, California built by Samuel Newsom, Newsom and Meyer

- 1878 – Courthouse, Superior Court of California, County of Napa, California
- 1879 – Napa Valley Opera House, 1018-1030 Main Street, Napa, California
- 1884 – Berkeley City Hall, Berkeley, California, demolished 1904
- 1884–1886 – Carson Mansion, 143 M Street, Eureka, California
- c. 1885 – Vollmer House, 1737 Webster Street, San Francisco, California, not the original location of the home, this location has outstanding decorative details.
- 1885 – Boyd House, Eureka, California
- 1885 – Murphy House, San Francisco, California, demolished 1906 after the earthquake, the Carter House Inn in Eureka is a reproduction of the Murphy House.
- 1886 – 975 Grove Street, San Francisco, California, this house has an unusual turret design, decorative brick, and an image of a bear.
- 1886 – Healdsburg City Hall, Healdsburg, California, demolished 1960
- 1887 – San Dimas Hotel, 121 N. San Dimas Avenue, San Dimas, California
- c.1887 – Bradbury Mansion, 147 North Hill Street, Los Angeles, California, was located in the Bunker Hill neighborhood and was demolished in 1929. Built at the cost of $80,000 for Lewis L. Bradbury. The house, a 35-room structure with five chimneys and five turrets, stood at the corner of Hill and Court streets.
- prior to 1888 – Magnin House, 1478–1482 Page Street, San Francisco, California, this is a two family style house and a prior owner was Isaac Magnin and his two daughters lived next door.
- 1889 – Green Apothecary, 500-502 Divisadero Street, San Francisco, California

=== Samuel Newsom, Newsom and Meyer (c.1898–1901) ===
- 1889 – 2602 Pacific Avenue, San Francisco, California, the former home of Meg Ryan and Dennis Quaid in the 1990s.
- 1889 – Carson House (or the "Pink Lady"), 202 M Street, Eureka, California
- 1889 – Patterson House (renovation/addition), Ardenwood Historic Farm, Fremont, California
- 1892 – 3198 Pacific Ave, San Francisco, California
- c.1892 – Simpson-Vance House, 904 G Street, Eureka, California
- 1905 – Old City Hall, Gilroy, California

== Publications ==
=== Articles ===
- Newsom, Samuel (1907). "The Santa Barbara Mission". Overland Monthly and Out West Magazine. pp. 351–352.
- Newsom, Samuel (1908). "The Romantic House of the Castros: A Bit of Old California, A Home Among The Meadow Larks". The Overland Monthly. Bret Harte. pp. 151–155.

=== Books ===
- Newsom, Samuel; Newsom, Joseph C. (1886). Picturesque Californian Homes, Second Volume. Vol. 2. H.S. Crocker & Co.
- Newsom, Samuel; Newsom, Joseph C. (1978). Picturesque California Homes, A Volume of Forty Plates, Plans, Details and Specifications of Houses Costing from $700 to $15,000. David Gebhard (introduction). San Francisco, California: Hennessey & Ingalls. ISBN 0912158824. (originally published in 1884)
