= Old City Hall (Gilroy, California) =

- U.S. National Register of Historic Places
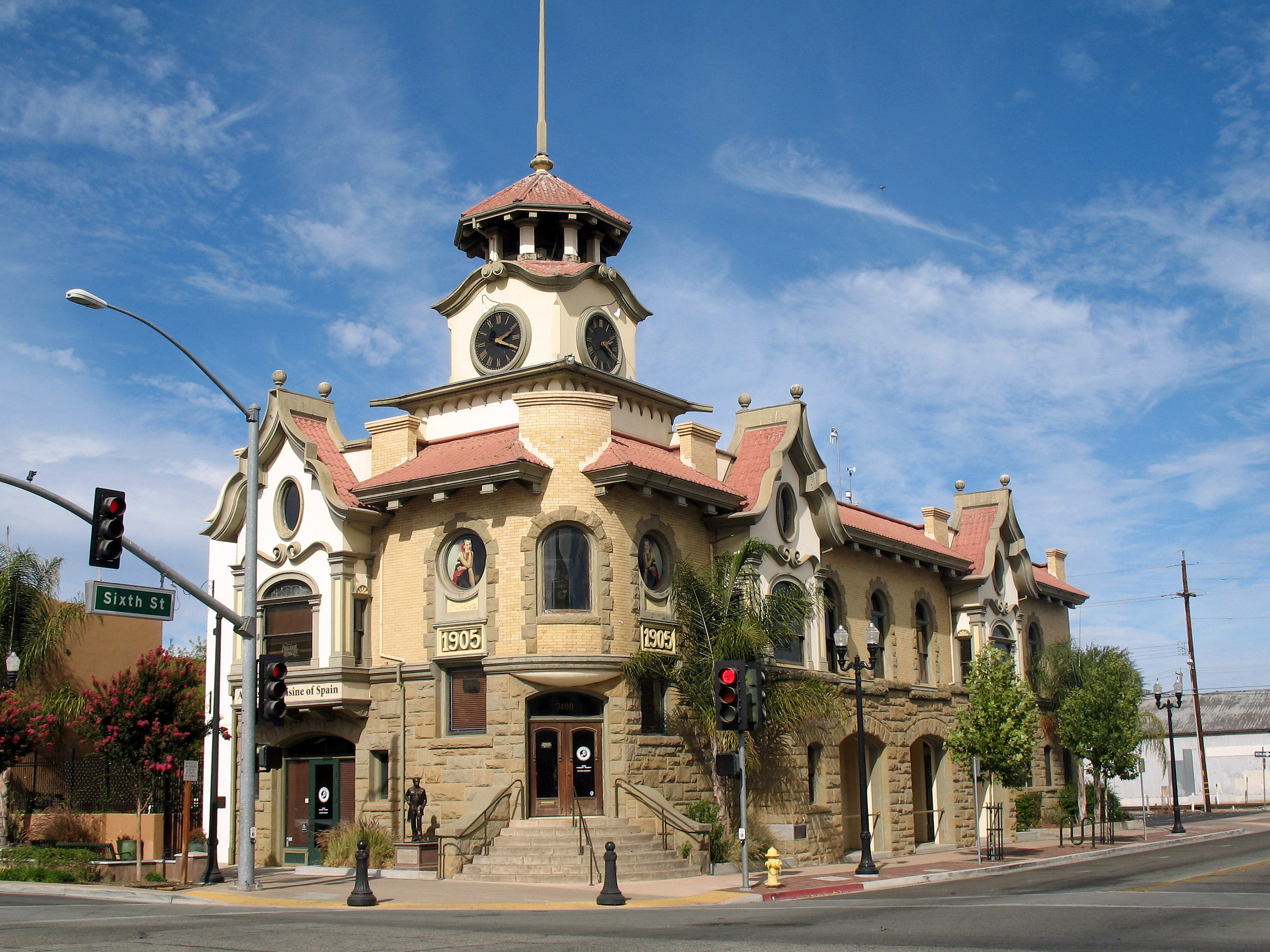

- Location within California
- Location: 7410 Monterey Street, Gilroy, California
- Coordinates: 37°00′26″N 121°34′07″W
- Built: 1905
- Architect: Samuel Newsom, Wolfe and McKenzie
- Architectural style: Mission Revival
- NRHP reference No.: 75000480
- Added to NRHP: April 16, 1975

The Old City Hall is a historical building built in 1905, and once served as a courthouse, the mayor's office, a jail, a clerk office, and fire department. The building is located at 7410 Monterey Street in Gilroy, California. It is listed on the National Register of Historic Places listings in Santa Clara County, California since April 16, 1975. The building is a good example of Californian architecture and the Mission Revival style at the turn of the century. It was nicknamed the "Grand Old Lady".

== History ==
The Old City Hall building was designed by architect Samuel Newsom, with help from architectural firm of Wolfe and McKenzie of San Jose. The lower level is made of greystone, second story of white brick topped with terra cotta coping and a red tile roof. The rustic stone exterior is reminiscent of the earlier Richardsonian Romanesque-era and some of the original architecture found at nearby Stanford University. There is a double golden oak stair in the entry of the building. The top of the building has a large clock tower, the clock itself is over 100 years old and has been repaired many times.

The 1989 Loma Prieta earthquake caused structural damages to the building, which were later repaired. In recent years the building has been used to house local restaurants.

== See also ==
- National Register of Historic Places listings in Santa Clara County, California
