= Margrit Mondavi =

American businesswoman

- Born: August 2, 1925; Appenzell, Switzerland
- Died: September 2, 2016 (aged 91); Napa, California, U.S.
- Children: Philip Biever Jr. Annie Biever; Phoebe Biever

Margrit Biever Mondavi (née Kellenberger; August 2, 1925 – September 2, 2016) was a Swiss-born American businesswoman. She was vice president of Cultural Affairs at Robert Mondavi Winery which she joined in 1967. Under her direction, Robert Mondavi Winery developed original cultural and culinary arts programs. She was the second wife of Robert Mondavi and worked with him in many of his philanthropic activities including the founding of the museum Copia. She played a key role in securing the downtown Napa location for the center, which opened in November 2001. She died of stomach cancer on September 2, 2016.

== Personal life ==
A native of Appenzell, Switzerland, Margrit Kellenberger was raised in her family home overlooking Lake Maggiore, in the canton of Ticino.

By the end of World War II, Margrit met Capt. Philip Biever, a United States Army captain. Following a brief courtship, they were married in the Church of Madonna del Sasso on a wooded hillside above the city of Locarno. The newlyweds settled in her husband's new duty station in North Dakota and had three children — Philip Jr., Annie and Phoebe. Following several more moves around the country, the Bievers settled in the Napa Valley in 1960.

After volunteering to help organize a concert at the Charles Krug Winery, she was hired by the winery and became the first female tour guide in the Napa Valley. Although the Krug Winery was owned by the Mondavi family, she did not meet her future husband Robert Mondavi until after he broke away from the family and started his own winery in 1966. Biever joined the Mondavi Winery the following year, when she was hired as director of public relations. Mondavi and Biever had a long-time affair and eventually divorced their first spouses in the late 1970s. Robert Mondavi and Margrit were married in Palm Springs in 1980.

== Working at the Robert Mondavi Winery ==
When Margrit started working at Robert Mondavi Winery, there were very few visitors frequenting Napa Valley. One of the first things Margrit did was establish a fine arts program at the winery that brought many different artists to the winery including Richard Diebenkorn, Wayne Thiebaud and Nathan Oliveira.

Margrit founded the winery's Summer Music Festival in 1969 as a benefit for the Napa Valley Symphony. This concert series has hosted many jazz, R&B and pop artists including Ella Fitzgerald, Harry Belafonte and Tony Bennett. The Robert Mondavi Summer Jazz Festival opens with the New Orleans Jazz Band Preservation Hall.

In 1984, the Festival of Winter Classical Concert Series was created, with the proceeds benefiting local musical organizations like the Napa Valley Opera. Together with Veronica di Rosa, Margrit and a small group of other Napa Valley art lovers formed a board of directors to rebuild the original 19th-century opera house in the city of Napa. She organized fundraising events, including art auctions, to keep the opera house alive. In 1998, the opera raised significant funds for the restoration as part of a challenge grant from Margrit and Robert Mondavi; the renovated opera house opened in October 2002.

After Mondavi was acquired in 2004, she kept working for the company.

In his autobiography, Robert Mondavi wrote :

Thanks in large measure to her, the marriage of fine wine, fine food, and gracious, healthy living has now become an enduring hallmark of the Robert Mondavi Winery.

— Robert Modavi, Harvests of Joy,

In 2012, she released her memoirs with Janet Fletcher as her ghost writer.

== Cooking ==
The Annie and Margrit cookbook

After ten years at Robert Mondavi Winery, Margrit introduced a program of cooking classes. She introduced the Great Chefs of France and the Great Chefs of America programs that are now known simply as Great Chefs at Robert Mondavi Winery.

In May 2003, Margrit and her daughter Annie Roberts, then the Robert Mondavi Winery's executive chef, released a collection of their recipes and stories called Annie and Margrit: Recipes and Stories from the Robert Mondavi Kitchen. In early 2004, the book won the 2003 Gourmand World Cookbook Awards' "Best in the World" distinction in the "Best Easy Recipes Book" category.

== Philanthropy ==
In 1997, Margarit and her husband issued a challenge grant of $2.2 million to spur the reconstruction of the Napa Valley Opera House in Napa. Robert and Margrit Mondavi were also major patrons of the restoration of the Lincoln Theatre in Yountville which was reopened in early 2005.

Also in 2001, Margrit and Robert made a $45-million personal gift to the University of California at Davis to establish the Robert Mondavi Institute for Wine and Food Science, and to launch the Robert and Margrit Mondavi Center for the Performing Arts, which opened in October 2002. The couple supported the Oxbow School, an art school in Napa that gives grants to and provides instruction for art students in their junior year of high school.

In 2015, UC Davis inaugurated the Margrit Mondavi Art Garden, a new on-campus sculpture garden .

== Published work ==
- Mondavi, Margrit (2012). Margrit Mondavi's Sketchbook: Reflections on Wine, Food, Art, Family, Romance, and Life. ISBN 978-0615604947.
