= Oxbow School =

Location
- 530 3rd Street; Napa, California 94559-2702; United States
- Coordinates: 38°18′2″N 122°16′43″W

Information
- Established: 1998; 28 years ago
- Founder: Ann Hatch; Robert Mondavi; Margrit Mondavi
- Teaching staff: 8.0 (FTE)
- Grades: 10–11–12–Gap Year
- Enrollment: 45 (2017–18)
- Student to teacher ratio: 5.6∶1 (2017–18)
- Accreditation: WASC / Cognia
- Website: oxbowschool.org

The Oxbow School is a private single-semester arts school for high school sophomores, juniors, seniors, and gap year students located in Napa, California, sitting near an oxbow of the Napa River. High school and gap year students can choose to attend in either the fall or spring semester with a visual arts and academic focus. Oxbow also offers a 6-week Summer Art Institute for the same grade levels.

The school trains students in painting, sculpture, printmaking, photography and digital media while still satisfying high school graduation requirements and preparing them for college admittance. The school was founded in 1997 and opened in 1999.

On May 20, 2024, the school announced that it would close after the 2024 Summer Art Institute session.

== Academics ==
Students are required to take one Science and Humanities class each as part of the morning routine. Physical Education is also a required course. In PE, students' choices include hiking, biking, gardening, running, and soccer. The school is accredited by the Western Association of Schools and Colleges (WASC) and Cognia.
