= San Dimas Hotel =

Historic hotel building in California, United States

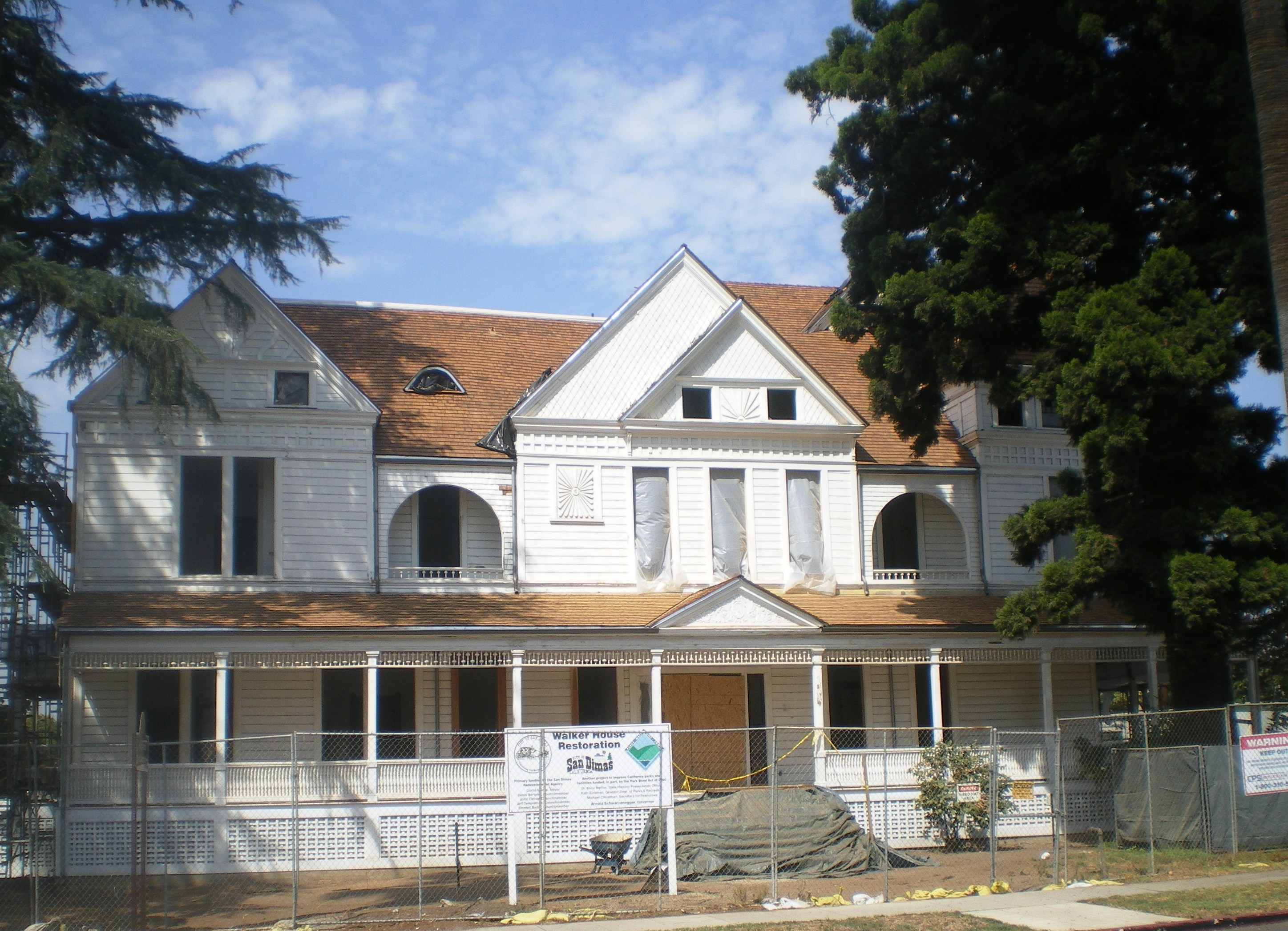
- San Dimas Hotel, August 2008

- Location within the Los Angeles metropolitan area Location within California Location within the United States
- Former names: Walker House, Carruthers Home, San Dimas Mansion

General information
- Type: hotel
- Architectural style: Queen Anne, Shingle Style, Queen Anne-Eastlake
- Location: 121 San Dimas Ave.,, San Dimas, California, United States
- Completed: 1887

Design and construction
- Architect: Joseph C. Newsom

Other information
- Number of rooms: 33
- San Dimas Hotel
- U.S. National Register of Historic Places
- Coordinates: 34°6′27″N 117°48′23″W
- Area: 0.6 acres (0.24 ha)
- NRHP reference No.: 72000233
- Added to NRHP: March 16, 1972

The San Dimas Hotel, also known as Walker House, the Carruthers Home, and the San Dimas Mansion, is a historic structure in San Dimas, California, built by the San Jose Ranch Company in 1887. Originally built as a hotel, the 15,000-square-foot (1,400 m^{2}) structure had 33 rooms and 14 fireplaces. The hotel was built in anticipation of a land boom that never happened, and it never had a paying guest. In 1889, the property was sold to James W. and Sue Walker for $25,000. After being occupied by seven generations of Walkers, the property was turned into a restaurant in 1979. The building became vacant in 1997 and was later acquired and renovated by the City of San Dimas. It was listed on the National Register of Historic Places in 1972.

== Architecture and history ==
=== Construction as a railroad hotel ===
The San Dimas Hotel was built as a "railroad hotel" on land that was part of the San Jose Rancho. In 1885, the transcontinental Santa Fe Railway completed its tracks between Los Angeles and San Bernardino, and there were expectations that a land boom would develop along the path of the railroad. In anticipation of the boom, the San Jose Ranch Co., a company operated by Moses Wicks and other investors, built the San Dimas Hotel. It was one of many hotels built in each town along the railroad between Pasadena and San Bernardino. It was only the second building in San Dimas, and is reported to be the only surviving 1880s era railroad hotel in Southern California.

The owners hired one of the state's most prestigious architects, Joseph Cather Newsom, to design the structure. Newsom and his brother, Samuel, created the firm Newsom & Newsom and built many prestigious buildings throughout California in the late 19th century, including the Carson Mansion in Eureka, California. The lumber used to build the hotel was floated down the coast from Oregon and Northern California on large lumber rafts, and hauled from San Pedro to San Dimas. The Victorian architecture Queen Anne style structure had 15,000 square feet (1,400 m^{2}) and was completed in 1887. It was designed with a variety of surface materials, including diamond patterned shingles. Ten tons of shingles were used on the gable roof. It also had a sunburst medallion, an ornamental cupola, balconies, corner towers, seven chimneys for 14 fireplaces, a large front porch, 140 feet (43 m) of veranda, 12-foot (3.7 m) ceilings, 18 bedrooms (33 rooms in all), and colored glass windows.

However, by the time the hotel was completed, an economic depression had hit Southern California, and the hotel never had any paying guests. Its original occupants were Moses Wicks and his partners in the San Jose Ranch Co. In April 1889, the Los Angeles Times described the hotel as "one of the boom enterprises that never paid as an investment, because there was no need of a hotel there." At that time, the owner, Mr. Wicks, was in negotiations to sell the property to the Odd Fellows for use as "an eleemosynary institution."

=== Ninety years as the Walker and Carruthers family home ===
James W. Walker, a prosperous merchant from Kentucky, purchased the hotel and 40 acres (160,000 m^{2}) surrounding for use as his family home in 1889. Walker became a successful citrus grower, and the house became a center of community life in San Dimas and the East San Gabriel Valley. Many of the area's clubs and social groups met at the home, and it was also the site of the first school and the first church services in San Dimas. For 90 years from 1889 to 1978, six generations of the Walker family lived at the converted hotel. From the 1910s through the 1960s, the home was occupied by Mrs. Raymond I. Carruthers, the granddaughter of James M. Walker. During this time, the house was commonly known as the "Carruthers Home." In 1961, Mrs. Carruthers noted that the cost of upkeep was enormous: "Anytime I have a repair bill, I feel as if it is a hotel." She died in August 1967.

Even in the mid-1970s, the Walker-Carruthers-Brunner family preserved the old structure. In 1975, residents of the house included Jim Carruthers, his sister, Sue Brunner, her husband, Fred Brunner, and their children. The old hotel desk, decorated with wood turnings, still sat at the base of the large staircase. In 2005, an old resident of San Dimas recalled that a butler wearing a tuxedo and white gloves would greet guests at the mansion.

=== Conversion to restaurant ===
In 1979, the house was leased to Don Wilcott, who renamed the property the "San Dimas Mansion" and opened an elegant dining restaurant called the Mansion Inn. Extensive changes were made to the structure to accommodate the restaurant. The restaurant was a success for a time, serving meals to John Wayne and Richard Nixon, though it closed in the late 1980s. The Carruthers family remained the owners and leased the old mansion for private functions for several years.

=== Vacancy and restoration ===
The building was vacant starting in 1997. In 1998, the San Dimas Festival of Western Arts acquired a lease-option on the property, which was later assigned to the City of San Dimas. The City eventually purchased the house in 2000. During the decade that the house was left vacant, area residents and preservationists complained that "the single most historical building in the city" was being left to rot. The City of San Dimas purchased the property and undertook an extensive plan to renovate the structure as a community asset for use by the San Dimas Festival of Arts and other community organizations. The renovation and construction work got under way in 2007 and was expected to be completed by the end of 2008. The cost of the renovation was $6.5 million, with a portion being funded by a preservation grant from the J. Paul Getty Trust.

== Historic recognition ==
In 1967, Los Angeles County gave the building the status of a historical landmark. It has also been recognized by the State of California as a point of historical interest. And in 1972, it was also added to the National Register of Historic Places. The house has been recognized as having historical significance because of both its architecture and its role in the history of San Dimas and the East San Gabriel Valley. The University of California, Berkeley School of Architecture chose the structure to depict the Victorian Era in its permanent exhibit on "The California House."

== Museum and community use ==
The restored Walker House is now the home of the San Dimas Historical Society and Museum, a community art gallery on the second floor, and office space for the San Dimas Festival of the Arts.

The museum is open on a limited basis, as is the art gallery. The San Dimas Historical Society provides guided tours of the Walker House on the third Saturday of each month. Space is limited and reservations are required.

== See also ==
- List of Registered Historic Places in Los Angeles County, California
