= Napa Valley Opera House =

- U.S. National Register of Historic Places
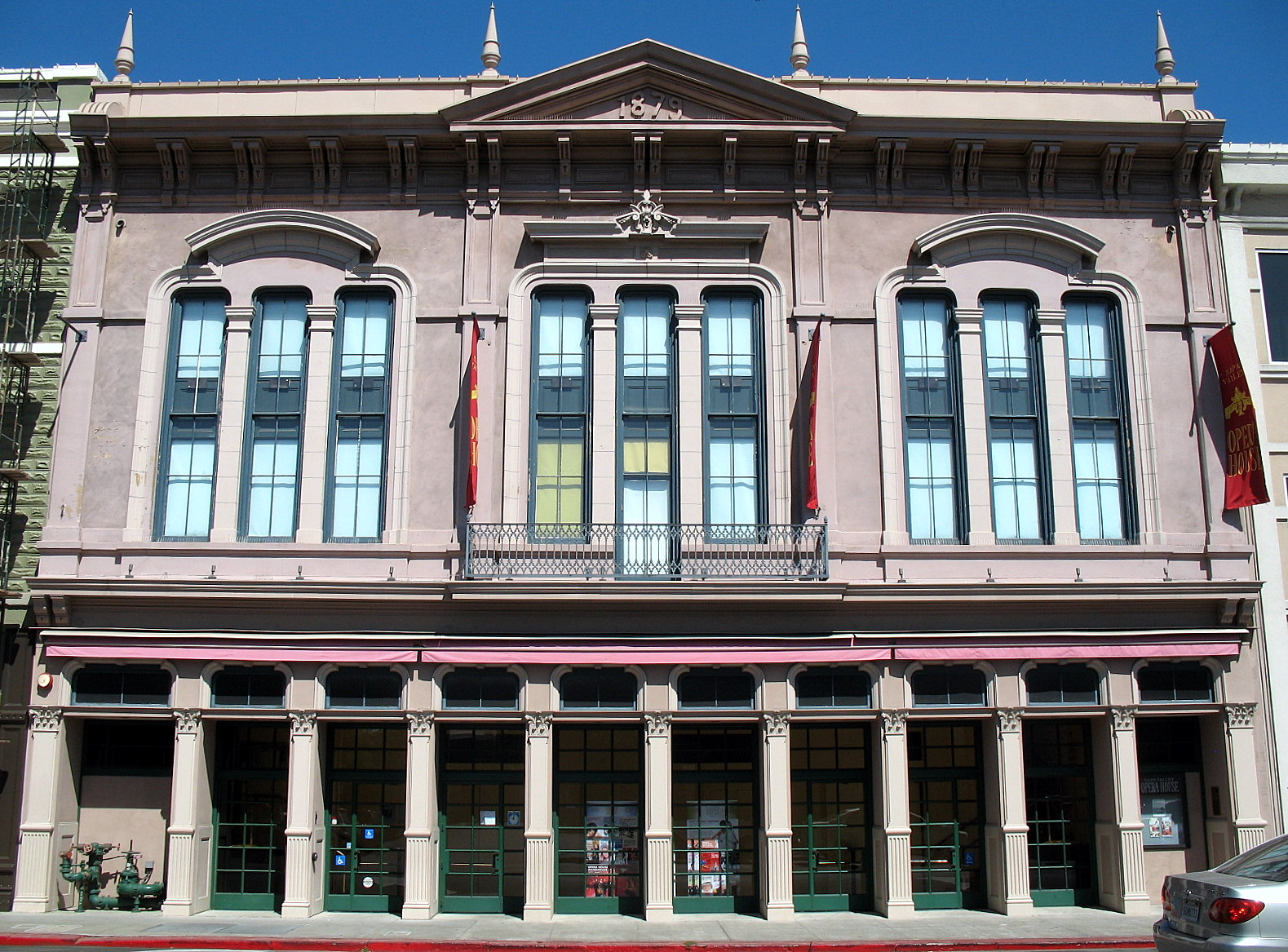
- Location: 1018–1030 Main St. on E side, Napa, California
- Coordinates: 38°17′59″N 122°17′4″W
- Area: 0.1 acres (0.040 ha)
- Built: 1879
- Architect: Newsom & Newsom
- Architectural style: Italianate
- NRHP reference No.: 73000414
- Added to NRHP: October 25, 1973

The Napa Valley Opera House is a historic multi-venue performance space in Napa, California currently home to Blue Note Napa and JaM Cellars Ballroom.

== Early days ==
The theater opened on February 13, 1880, with a production of Gilbert and Sullivan's HMS Pinafore.

The original owner of the theater was George Crowey; Charles Levansaler managed the facility. The building was designed in the Italianate style by Newsom and Newsom (Samuel Newsom and Joseph C. Newsom). Newsom and Newsom were the renowned architects of the 19th century who also built the Carson Mansion in Eureka, California in addition to many public and private buildings throughout the State. Construction of the theater featuring a stained glass skylight, brass chandeliers and a curved staircase leading to the balcony started in 1879. The building had stores and restaurants on the first floor while the stage occupied the second and third floor. The floor of the auditorium was uniquely constructed with a flat floor in order to accommodate local dances and pageants. The theater had an advertising curtain where local businesses were promoted.

During the height of vaudeville, the theatre flourished with the presentation of music and variety acts. In 1896 John L. Sullivan fought an exhibition match and John Philip Sousa brought his brass band to the venue. In 1905, following her debut in San Francisco, Luisa Tetrazzini performed on stage and in the same year, Jack London read from his works.

The theatre closed in 1914 due to damage from the 1906 San Francisco earthquake, the decline of vaudeville, and the advent of film. During the following seventy years, the building was used for a variety of commercial purposes.

== Revival and restoration ==
The structure was added to the National Register of Historic Places in 1973; however, it was not until 1985 that a non-profit group was set up to restore the theatre. In 1997, Robert Mondavi and his wife Margrit issued a challenge grant of $2.2 million to spur the theatre's reconstruction towards the total cost of $13.7 million for the project.

== Reopening ==
The bottom floor of the building was converted to an intimate venue with seating for 200 people. It was named the Cafe Theatre and it opened in June 2002 with a performance by jazz singer Dianne Reeves.

The larger upstairs venue opened on July 31, 2003, with an opening-night performance by Rita Moreno followed by a performance of Gilbert and Sullivan's HMS Pinafore, the same show that opened the original venue 123 years prior.

The upstairs theatre has seating for an audience of 500, modern lighting and sound system with an orchestra pit large enough for 40 musicians. The venue now hosts several headline entertainment acts every month including plays, musical performances and dance.

In June 2011, the City Council of Napa voted to grant a $1.5 million forgivable loan to help retire the $3.4 million debt remaining on the facility. Funds for the grant came from existing redevelopment funds that had not been committed to other projects. The terms of the loan included several conditions that would benefit the city and its citizens by allowing the city to use the building for up to 24 days per year at cost and requiring the facility to be rented twice per year to nonprofit organizations at a discounted rate. By 2011, the facility was booking over 100 events per year with a goal of increasing this number to 200 events.

In August 2011, the Board of Directors hired Peter Williams as the new Executive / Artistic Director. He came to Napa from Yoshi's jazz club in Oakland where he was Artistic Director from May 1999 until July 2011. Peter Williams left City Winery in May 2014 to move back to booking Yoshi's San Francisco, which was sold to new owners.

After a $2.5 million renovation, Michael Dorf's 300-seat venue, City Winery, opened on April 10, 2014. City Winery ceased operating the venue in late 2015.

== Music Venues (2016 - present) ==
Following City Winery's departure, the historic opera house was revitalized in 2016 with the opening of two distinct music venues within the building. Together, these venues have transformed the Napa Valley Opera House into a significant live music destination for California, presenting over 300 shows annually and attracting both local audiences and international visitors to downtown Napa.

=== Blue Note Napa ===
Blue Note Napa occupies the first floor of the opera house, continuing the building's jazz heritage as an intimate 150-seat jazz club. Named after the legendary Blue Note Jazz Club, it presents jazz, R&B, soul, and blues artists. The venue sought to maintain the building's historic charm while providing state-of-the-art sound and an intimate setting for performances.

=== JaM Cellars Ballroom ===
Formally known as the Napa Valley Opera House Ballroom, the JaM Cellars Ballroom occupies the second and third floors, utilizing the original 650-seat theater space. This larger venue hosts diverse musical acts including rock, pop, country, and world music, maintaining the opera house's tradition as a premier performance space in downtown Napa.
