= Peter Mondavi =

American winemaker

- Born: November 8, 1914; Virginia, Minnesota, US
- Died: February 20, 2016 (aged 101)
- Education: Stanford University
- Occupations: Winemaker; philanthropist
- Website: www.charleskrug.com

Peter Mondavi Sr. (November 8, 1914 – February 20, 2016) was an American winemaker.

Born to Italian immigrants Cesare and Rosa Mondavi, as the youngest of four children, he moved from Minnesota to Lodi, California in 1922, when his father began a firm transporting grapes during the Prohibition. He graduated with a degree in economics from Stanford University in 1937 and began further study in Enology at the University of California, Berkeley, disrupted by his service in the Second World War.

His parents bought the Charles Krug winery in Napa Valley in 1943, and on his father's death sixteen years later, the business was split between Peter Mondavi and his brother Robert. The two fought, and the latter founded his own eponymous winery in 1966. They reconciled in 2005 and made a new wine together. Mondavi was recognised by Wine Spectator as one of the "Napa Mavericks" who pioneered the industry in the valley.

Mondavi married Blanche Hurtzig after his military service, and they remained together until her death in 2010. They had two sons and a daughter, nine grandchildren and two great-grandchildren. He died of natural causes aged 101 in St. Helena, California. He credited his longevity to genes, hard work, pasta and a daily glass of wine.
