= Robert Mondavi =

American winemaker

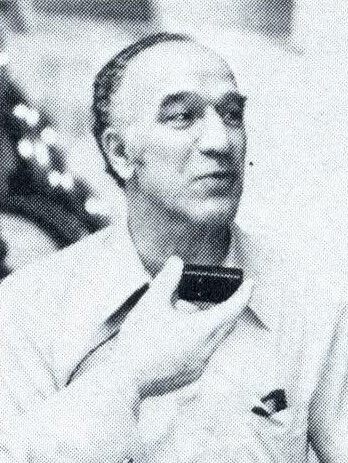
- Mondavi in 1971
- Born: June 18, 1913; Virginia, Minnesota, US
- Died: May 16, 2008 (aged 94); Yountville, California, US
- Education: Stanford University
- Occupations: Winemaker; philanthropist
- Spouses: Marjorie Declusin (m. 1937; div. 1979) Margrit Biever (m. 1980)
- Children: 3
- Awards: Order of Merit of the Italian Republic (2002), French Legion of Honour (2005); California Hall of Fame (2005)
- Website: robertmondaviwinery.com

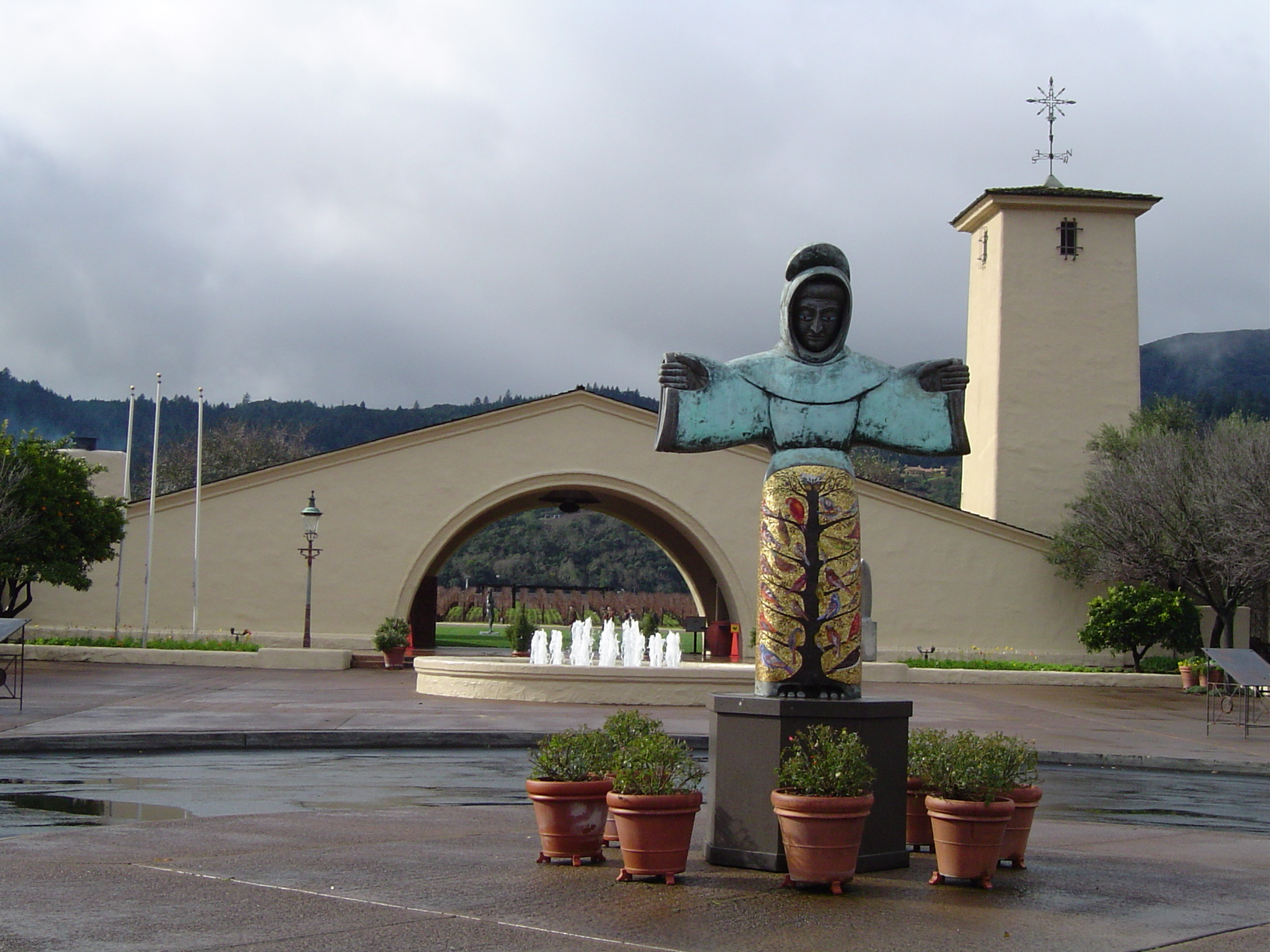
The entrance of Robert Mondavi Winery.

Robert Gerald Mondavi (June 18, 1913 – May 16, 2008) was an American winemaker. His technical and marketing strategies brought worldwide recognition for the wines of the Napa Valley in California. From an early period, Mondavi promoted labeling wines varietally rather than generically, which became the standard for New World wines. The Robert Mondavi Institute (RMI) for Wine and Food Science at the University of California, Davis opened in October 2008 in his honor.

== Family history ==
Robert Mondavi's parents, Cesare Mondavi and Rosa Grassi, emigrated from Sassoferrato in the Marche region of Italy and settled in Hibbing, Minnesota. Robert Gerald Mondavi was born in Virginia, Minnesota. From Minnesota the Mondavi family moved to Lodi, California, where he attended Lodi High School. In Lodi, his father, Cesare, established a fruit packing business under the name C. Mondavi and Sons, packing and shipping grapes to the east coast primarily for home winemaking. Mondavi graduated from Stanford University in 1936 with a degree in economics and business administration.

In 1943, Mondavi joined his father and brother Peter after the family acquired the Charles Krug Winery located in St. Helena, California, from James Moffitt. In 1965, Robert Mondavi left the family winery after a feud with his younger brother Peter over the business direction of the Krug Winery. Subsequently, Mondavi started his own winery in Oakville, California.

Part of Mondavi's original vineyard land included the To Kalon (a Greek term meaning "the beautiful") vineyard originally established by Napa Valley pioneer H.W. Crabb in 1868. The winery produced wine in the California mission style. Mondavi selected Cliff May to design the winery building, which opened in 1966 and is now considered an architectural icon in the Napa Valley, with an expansive entryway arch and bell tower.

== Family ==
In 1937, Mondavi married his high school sweetheart, Marjorie Ellen (Declusin) Mondavi. Together, the couple had three children: Michael, Marcia, and Tim. In the late 1970s, their marriage ended in a divorce. In 1980, at the age of 67, he married Margrit (Kellenberger) Biever Mondavi, a Swiss-born, and multilingual woman who worked at the Robert Mondavi winery.

== Wine history ==
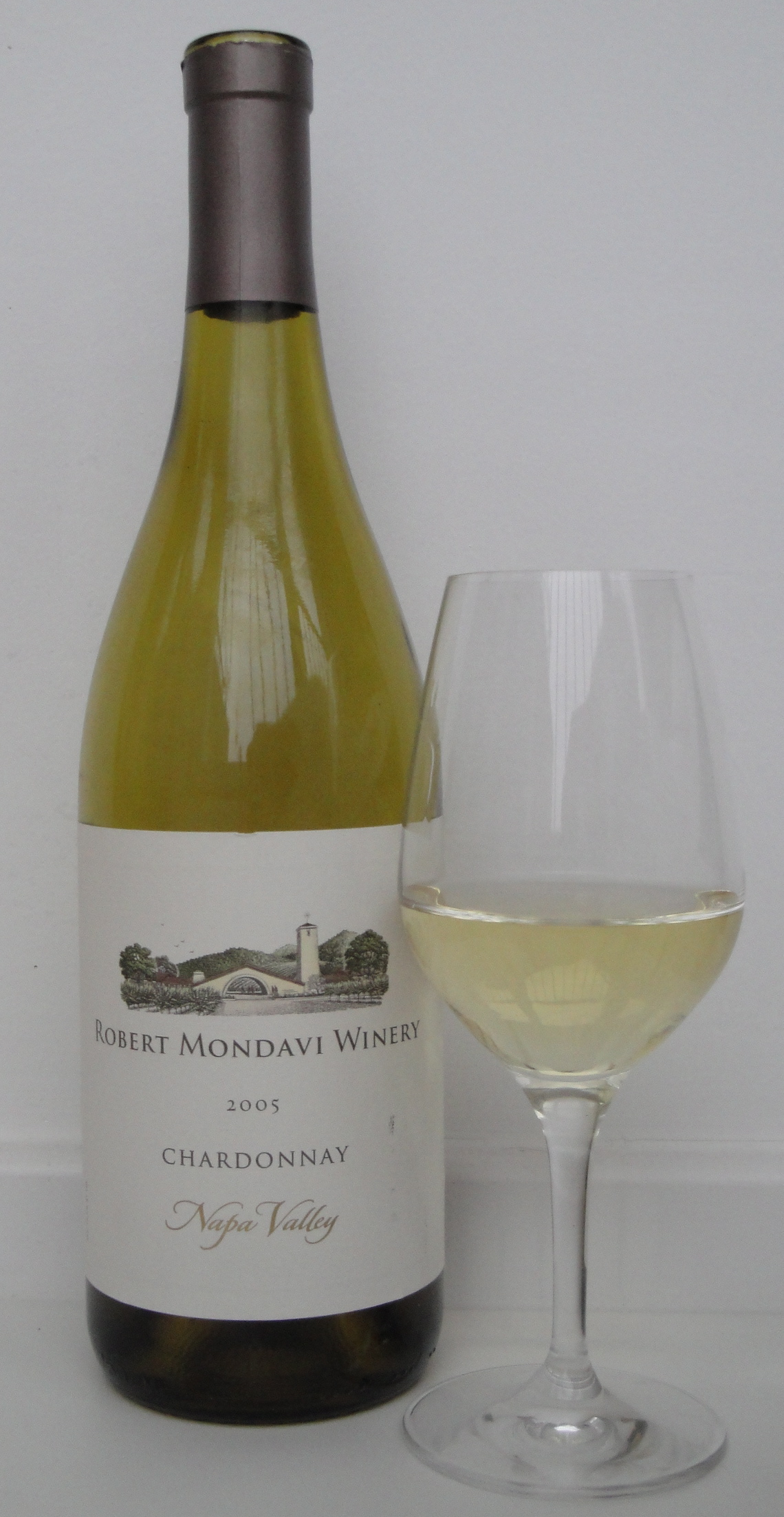
A wine from the Robert Mondavi Winery, a Napa Valley Chardonnay.

In 1968, Mondavi made a dry oak–aged Sauvignon blanc, an unpopular variety in California at the time, and labeled it "Fumé Blanc".

Mondavi entered into a joint venture with Baron Philippe de Rothschild of Château Mouton Rothschild to create Opus One Winery, and since the 1990s has set up joint ventures with local partners in Europe, South America and Australia.

In the Grand European Jury Wine Tasting of 1997, the Robert Mondavi Chardonnay Reserve was ranked number one.

In 2005, Mondavi and his younger brother Peter made wine together for the first time after their feud. Using grapes from both family vineyards, they produced one barrel of cabernet blend, which was sold for $400,000 under the name "Ancora Una Volta" ("Once Again") at the 2005 Napa Valley Auction.

== Legacy ==
In 2001, Mondavi donated $10 million to help with the building cost of the Robert and Margrit Mondavi Center for the Performing Arts building at UC Davis.

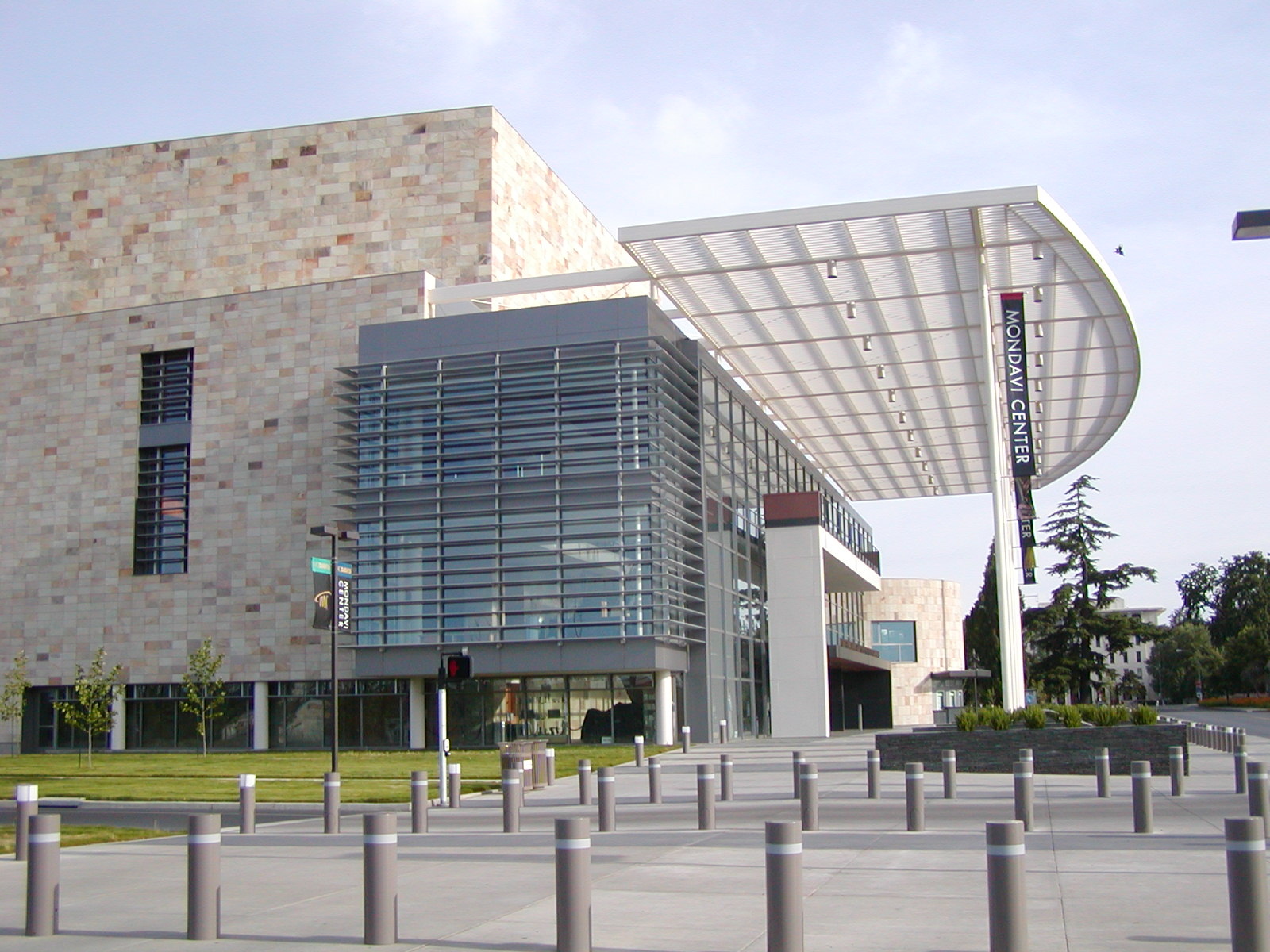
UC Davis Mondavi Center

In 2003, Mondavi expressed regret and criticized his sons for the business strategy that emphasized the inexpensive Mondavi lines, Coastal and Woodbridge, over the premium wines, allowing the company name to lose its association with fine wine it held in the past. He said, "We've got to get our image back, and that's going to take time."

In the 2004 documentary film Mondovino, the Mondavi family featured prominently, in close application to its theme of globalization.

On December 22, 2004, Constellation Brands acquired the Mondavi winery in a controversial takeover for nearly US$1.36 billion in cash and assumption of debt. Following the sale of the company, Mondavi partnered with his younger son Tim Mondavi and daughter Marcia Mondavi to make a single wine from a single estate at the highest level.

Robert and Margrit were also founding supporters of the restoration of the 19th-century Napa Valley Opera House and the Oxbow School, a new art school in Napa that provides grants and instruction to art students in their junior year of high school.

== Death ==
Mondavi died at his Yountville home on May 16, 2008, at the age of 94.

== Published works ==
- Modavi, Robert (1998). Harvests of Joy: How the Good Life Became Great Business. Mariner Books.

== Awards and honors ==
In 1985, Mondavi received the Golden Plate Award of the American Academy of Achievement.

Robert Mondavi was selected as the Decanter "Man of the Year" in 1989. He was inducted into the Junior Achievement U.S. Business Hall of Fame in 1991.

In 2002, he received the Order of Merit of the Italian Republic. In 2005, he received the Legion of Honour from the French government.

On December 5, 2007, California Governor Arnold Schwarzenegger and First Lady Maria Shriver inducted Mondavi into the California Hall of Fame, located at The California Museum for History, Women and the Arts.

He was inducted into the Culinary Institute of America Vintner's Hall of Fame in 2007.

== See also ==
- List of wine personalities
- Sena wine
