= Divisadero Street =

City street in San Francisco, CA, US

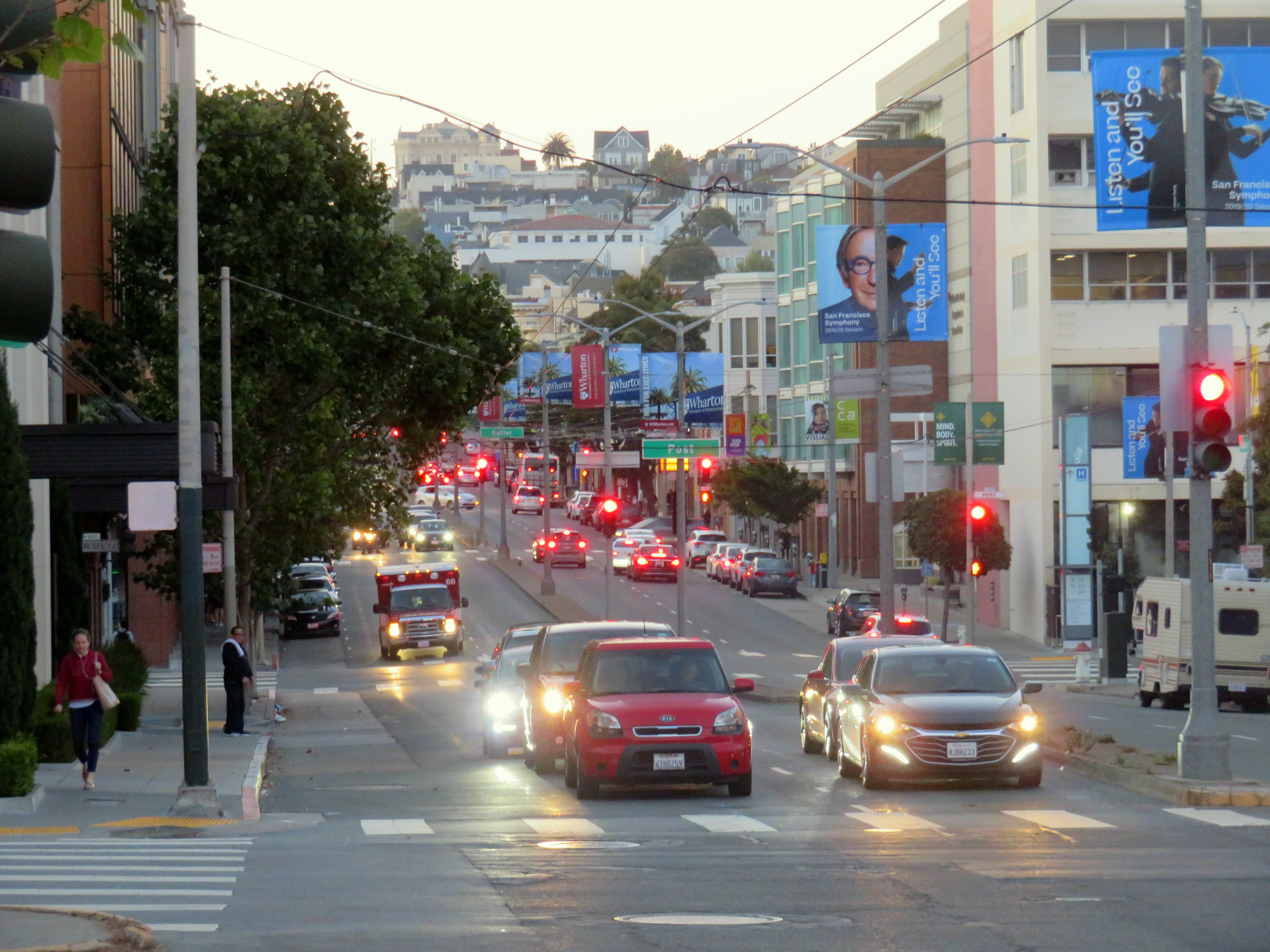
- Divisadero Street viewed from Geary Boulevard at evening twilight in August 2019
- Location: San Francisco, California
- South end: 14th Street near Buena Vista Park
- North end: Marina Boulevard at the Marina District

Divisadero Street (commonly shortened to Divis, pronounced /dɪˈvɪz/) is a north–south city street in San Francisco, California. Beginning at the city's northern waterfront, it runs south, passing through the Marina District, Cow Hollow, Pacific Heights, and further provides the traditional boundary between several neighborhoods before terminating at 14th Street, near Buena Vista Park and Corona Heights Park.

== Background ==
Divisadero Street is continuous with Castro Street in the Castro District, San Francisco. The road was laid out when the Western Addition was planned in the 1850s. It was initially the western city boundary. Cable cars along the street provided traffic which supported a vibrant commercial corridor in the streetcar suburb starting in the 1870s.

In 1909, the road, Devisadero Street was renamed Divisadero Street.

"San Francisco ought to be able to put up with Devisadero, even if it is an improper spelling of a Spanish word" - San Francisco Chronicle, November 1910

The neighborhood would evolve from a Jewish population to a predominantly African American population, which was largely displaced by urban renewal projects in the 1960s.

== Transportation ==
San Francisco Municipal Railway bus service is offered along the corridor via the 24 Divisadero south of Jackson Street and the 30 Stockton in the Marina District.

== Attractions ==
A Farmers' Market is held on Sunday morning, year-round, located in the parking lot of a California Department of Motor Vehicles field office at 1377 Fell Street between Baker Street and Broderick Street.
