= Carson Mansion =

Historic building in Eureka, California

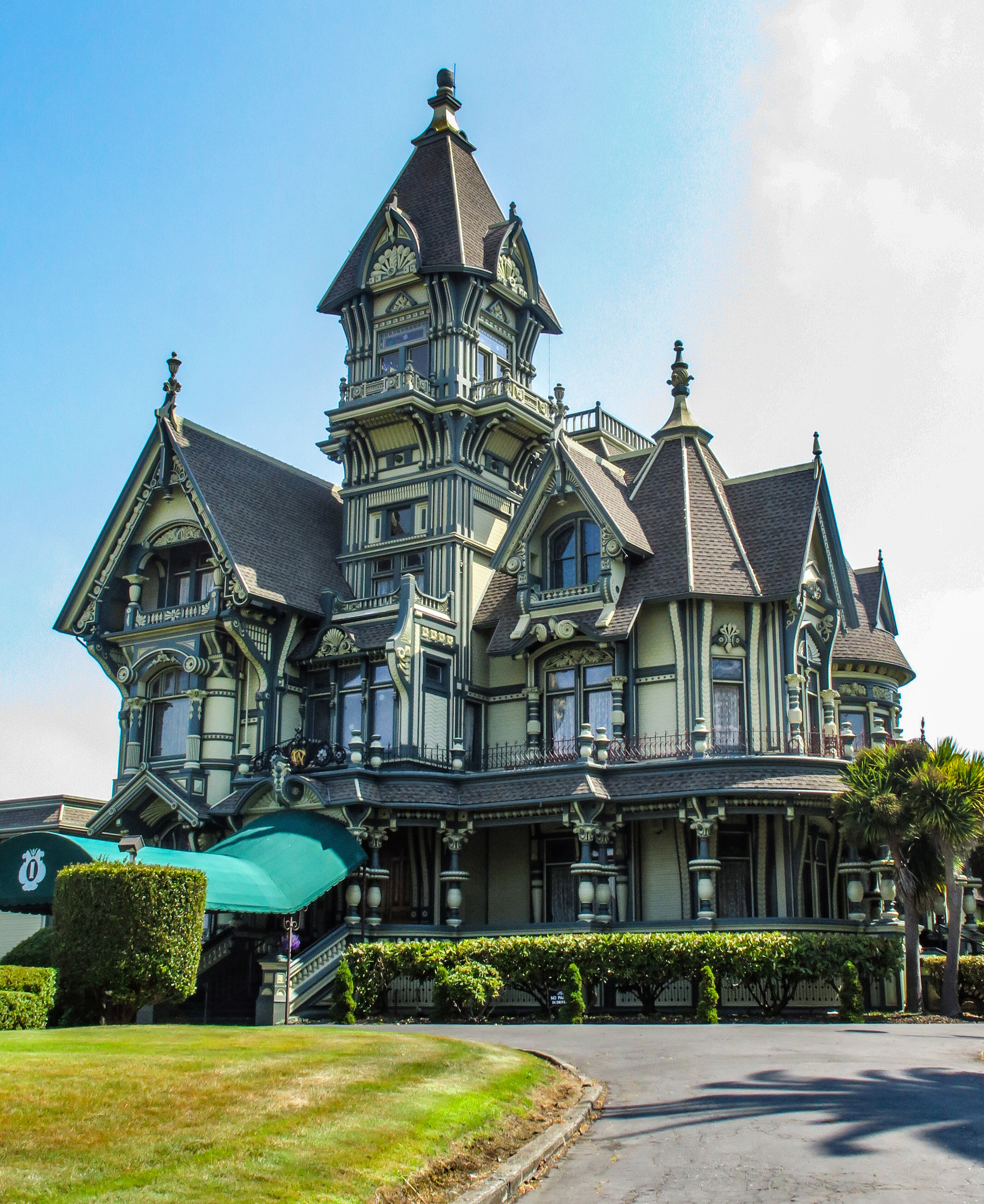

- Location within California Carson Mansion (the United States)
- Interactive map showing Carson Mansion’s location

General information
- Architectural style: Queen Anne
- Location: 143 M Street; Eureka, California, United States
- Coordinates: 40.80562°N 124.15848°W
- Construction started: 1884
- Completed: 1886
- Cost: $80,000 (equivalent to $2,866,667 in 2025)
- Client: William Carson
- Owner: Ingomar Club

Technical details
- Structural system: Concrete foundation; Douglas Fir frame; Redwood exterior
- Size: In excess of 16,200 sq ft (1,510 m^{2}) on 3 floors (excluding basement) plus 103-foot (31 m) tower; 18 rooms

Design and construction
- Architects: Samuel Newsom and Joseph Cather Newsom
- Engineer: W. H. Mills (construction supervisor)

The Carson Mansion is a large Victorian house, constructed from 1884 to 1886 and located in Old Town, Eureka, California. Regarded as one of the premier examples of Queen Anne style architecture in the United States, the house is "considered the most grand Victorian home in America." It is one of the most written about and photographed Victorian houses in California and possibly also in the United States.

== About ==
Originally the home of William Carson, one of Northern California's first major lumber barons, it has been a private club since 1950. The house and grounds are not open to the public. It is owned and occupied by the private Ingomar Club.

== Carson family history ==
William Coleman Carson (July 15, 1825, New Brunswick – February 20, 1912, Eureka), for whom the house was built, arrived in San Francisco from New Brunswick, Canada, with a group of other woodsmen in 1849. After rolling out gold slugs in San Francisco, they joined in the northern gold rush, arriving in the Trinity Mountains via the Eel River and Humboldt Bay. They left the Trinity Mountains to overwinter at Humboldt Bay and contracted to provide logs for a small sawmill. In November 1850, Carson and Jerry Whitmore felled a tree, the first for commercial purposes on Humboldt Bay. All winter, Carson and his team hauled logs from the Freshwater Slough to the Pioneer Mill on the shores of Humboldt Bay.

In spring, the party went back to the mines where they had previously staked claim on Big Bar by the Trinity River. They built a dam and continued mining until they heard that a large sawmill was being built at Humboldt Bay. They went south through the Sacramento Valley, bought oxen, and returned to Humboldt Bay by August 1852, where Carson, alone, went into the lumber business permanently. In 1854, he shipped the first loads of redwood timber to San Francisco. Previously, only fir and spruce had been logged.

In 1863, Carson and John Dolbeer formed the Dolbeer and Carson Lumber Company. Eighteen years later, in 1881, as the company advanced into areas more difficult to log, Dolbeer invented the Steam Donkey Engine which revolutionized log removal, especially in hard-to-reach areas. At about the same time, Carson was involved in the founding of the Eel River and Eureka Railroad with John Vance. Before commencing the building of his mansion, Carson said, "If I build it poorly, they would say that I am a damned miser; if I build it expensively, they will say I'm a show off; guess I'll just build it to suit myself." In 1884, on the eve of construction of the great home, the company was producing 15,000,000 board feet (35,000 m^{3}) of lumber annually. The milling operations, combined with additional investments as far away as Southern California and at least partial ownerships in schooners used to move the lumber to booming markets on the west coast and all over the globe, set the stage for the seemingly unlimited budget and access to resources. Pacific Lumber Company purchased the company in 1950 and maintained milling operations at the original Humboldt Bay site, located bay-side below the house, well into the 1970s. Following the Carson family divestiture of remaining family holdings (including the home) in 1950, the family left the area.

The building was purchased for $35,000 in 1950 by local community business leaders, and now houses the Ingomar Club, a private club, which was named after Carson's Ingomar Theater, itself named for Carson's favorite play, Ingomar the Barbarian.

== Architecture ==
The house is a mix of every major style of Victorian architecture, including but not limited to: Eastlake, Italianate, Queen Anne (primary), and Stick. One nationally known architectural historian described the house as "a baronial castle in Redwood" and stated further that "The illusion of grandeur in the house is heightened by the play on scale, the use of fanciful detail and the handling of mass as separate volumes, topped by a lively roofscape." The style of the house has been described as "eclectic" and "peculiarly American." The building has always been maintained and is in nearly the same condition as when it was built.

In May 1964, the house was included in the Historic American Buildings Survey (HABS) as catalog number CA-1911. This is the only official historical building listing of the house. Although the historic house does merit National Register of Historic Places status, the Ingomar Club has chosen not to apply for it.

=== Architects ===
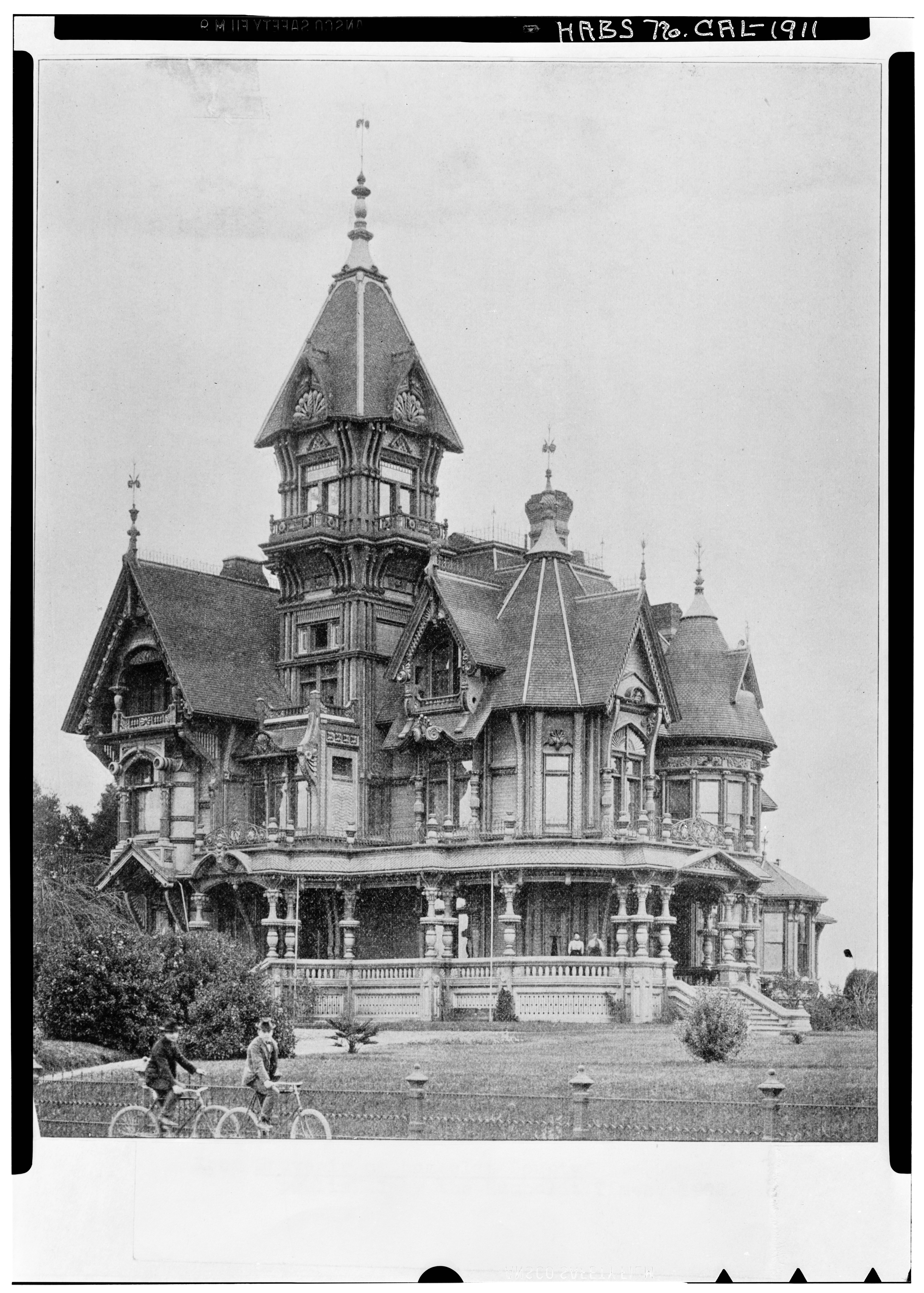
The Carson Mansion in 1902

Samuel Newsom and Joseph Cather Newsom of the firm Newsom and Newsom of San Francisco (and later Los Angeles and Oakland) were nineteenth century builder-architects contracted by Carson to create the house by 1883. Of their many commissions in California, many of the original buildings remain in addition to the Carson house, including the Napa Valley Opera House and the San Dimas Hotel.

One Queen Anne style Victorian house they designed in Eureka was named "The Pink Lady," which William Carson gifted to his son Milton as a wedding present in 1889. After being sold in 1920, it went through several owners before being inherited by sisters in Germany. It operated as a rooming house until it was seized as Nazi property in 1942. In 1964, it became the first historic building in Eureka to be restored. Another of their Queen Anne style designs was built in Eureka in 1982 as the Carter House Inn. It is a replica of the 1885 Murphy House in San Francisco, designed by Newsom and Newsom, which was lost in the 1906 San Francisco earthquake.

== In popular culture ==
Images of the house are prevalent in website designs and video animations as well as on posters, paintings, and book covers. This popularity also has led to replicas being created in amusement parks, including the clock tower on the train station at Disneyland. The home also serves as a model for haunted house artwork and design.
