= History of California wine =

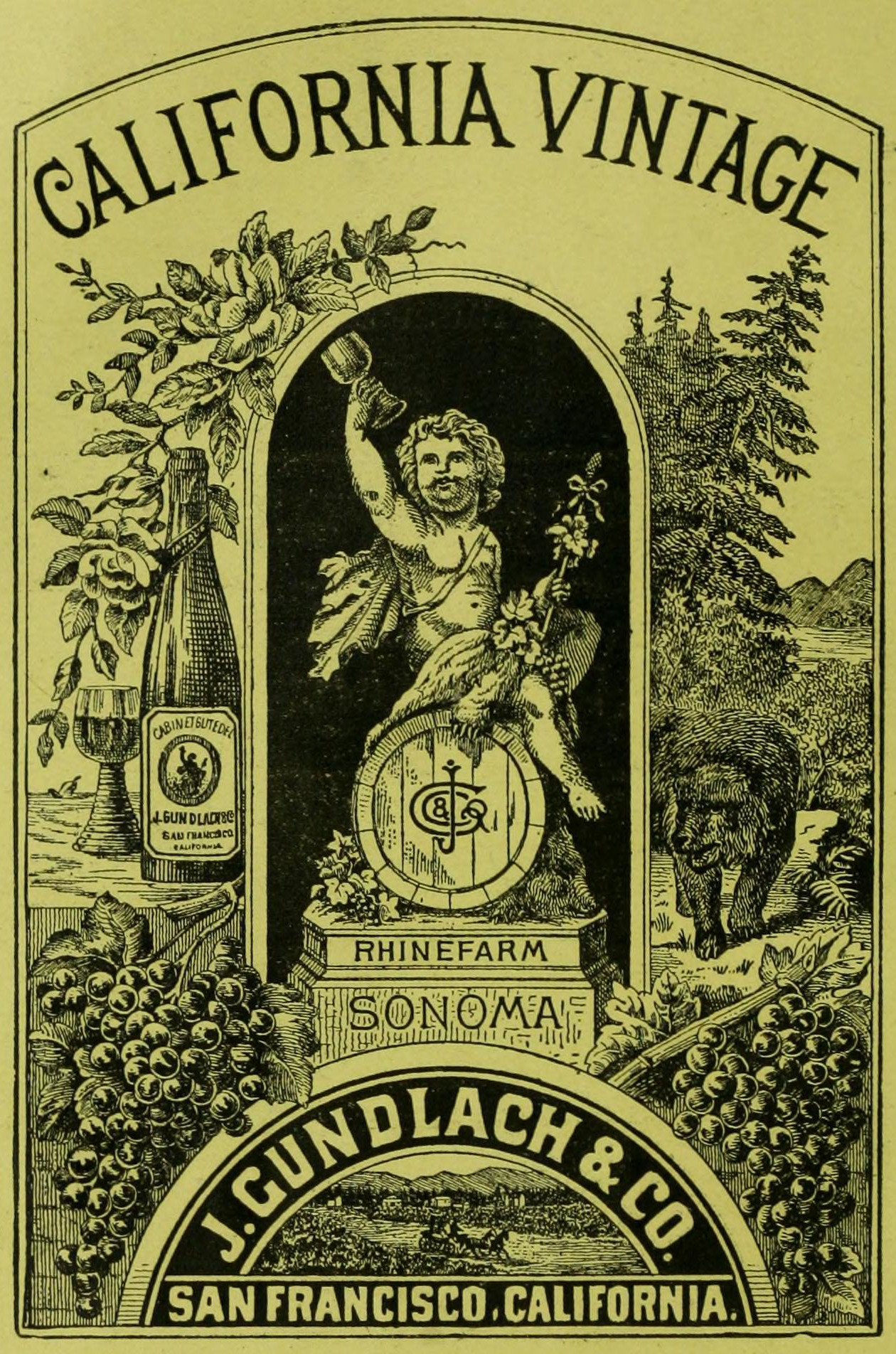
1889 advertisement for California wine by J. Gundlach & Co. of the Sonoma Valley

California wine has a long and continuing history, and in the late twentieth century became recognized as producing some of the world's finest wine. While wine is made in all fifty U.S. states, up to 90% (by some estimates) of American wine is produced in the state. California would be the fourth largest producer of wine in the world if it were an independent nation.

== Vineyards during Spanish colonization ==
Although conflicting accounts exist, the first recorded planting of a vineyard was probably by the Spanish Jesuit Missionary Eusebio Francisco Kino at Misión San Bruno in Baja California in 1683 implanting the first variety named "Misionéro". In 1779, Franciscan missionaries under the direction of the Spanish Father Junípero Serra planted California's first vineyard at Mission San Juan Capistrano. Journals kept at San Juan Capistrano show that between May 1779 and 1781, the padres supervised six campesinos from Baja California in planting 2,000 grapevines at the mission. The first winery in Alta California was built in San Juan Capistrano in 1783; both red and white wines (sweet and dry), brandy, and a port-like fortified wine called Angelica were all produced from the Mission grape. Father Serra founded eight other California missions. Hence, he has been called the "Father of California Wine". The variety he planted, presumably descended from Spain, became known as the Mission grape and dominated California wine production until about 1880.

The oldest vineyard in California is the San Jose Vineyard situated under the mountains in Santa Barbara county, between Goléta and San Marcos Pass. It was the property of the Church up to 1853, when it was sold by the Archbishop of the Los Angeles Diocese to an eccentric old pioneer named James McCaffrey, who, with his sons, now cultivates the old vines, producing annually about 8,000 gallons of the best vintage. One of the strangest things to be mentioned concerning this ancient vineyard is this: It has not been plowed or cultivated for 30 years. It produces a good crop of wild oats for hay year after year, but no plow is permitted to disturb the soil. The old man declines to explain how he never fails to have a full crop while his neighbors have none. Here upon the sides of an ancient old adobe building is a vine which starting near the door, divides and sends a branch in opposite directions, and after making a circuit of the building, more than 100 feet, both ends have been grafted together, forming a complete hoop around the building.

== Early wine industry ==
In 1829, 17 acres of Mission Grape vines were planted in Pueblo de Los Angeles by Ysidro Reyes, (grandson of Juan Francisco Reyes the 3rd & 5th Alcade de Pueblo). Ysidro Reyes had been born at Mission San Gabriel where he had learned to cultivate and ferment this hardy grape. All of the Missions raised this grape for sacramental wine, but the residents of the Pueblo developed a taste for drinking wine. The fermentation process consisted of placing the grapes into a cowhide hung loosely from four trees or posts. A popular drink was the fortified wine known as Angelica. It is unknown if Reyes was the first commercial winemaker in Los Angeles, but he appears to have supported his family solely from his role in producing wine. In 1831, Reyes had the good fortune of becoming the neighbor of newly arrived French cooper and distiller Jean- Louis Vignes who would serve as a mentor to young Reyes.

Upon arriving in Los Angeles in 1831, Jean Louis Vignes had bought and cultivated 104 acres of land located between the original Pueblo and the banks of the Los Angeles River. He named his property El Aliso after the centuries-old white alder tree found near the entrance. He planted a vineyard and started preparing to make wine. Vignes's early experiments, while waiting for his own vines to mature, were with his neighbor Ysidro Reyes' newly producing vineyards. During the three years that it took for Vignes' vines to begin producing grapes, the two men worked well together and became friends with Vignes serving as a mentor to Reyes in improving the quality of the wine. The Mission grape grew well and yielded large quantities of wine, but Vignes was not satisfied with the results even after attempting to discern if aging it would improve the taste. The common practice at the time was to drink the wine as soon as it was fermented unless it were to be made into Angelica, a fortified wine distilled similarly to Port. Vignes decided it was necessary to import better vines from Bordeaux, Cabernet Franc and Sauvignon blanc. The vines transited around Cape Horn. To preserve their roots during the long trip, they were inserted in moss and potato slices. Vignes became the first Californio who grew quality vines, and the first who aged his wines. By the time Ysidro Reyes left Pueblo de Los Angeles in 1839 to plant the vineyard of his newly awarded Rancho Boca de Santa Monica, he had become a skilled vintner, with an excellent source for aging barrels and a wagon load of grafts from Vignes' European Bordeaux grapes that would flourish in the fertile Santa Monica Canyon. The exact date of Vignes first vintage from the European vines is unknown. However, it was may have been 1837, because in 1857 he ran an advertisement claiming that some of his wines were 20 years old. The wood for the barrels came from land Vignes owned in the San Bernardino Mountains. Thus in the early 1800s California commercial viticulture was mostly based in Southern California. While Jean-Louis Vignes is recognized as California's first documented importer of European wine vines, planted on his land in Los Angeles in 1833, he was quickly followed by William Wolfskill, another major early wine maker in California, who purchased his first vineyard in 1838 in the Los Angeles area. By 1858 he owned 55,000 vines across 145 acres. Vignes and Wolfskill were the two major figures in California wine making in the 1830s and 1840s. Their success attracted others and increased interest in wine cultivation in Southern California.

In 1840, Jean-Louis Vignes made the first recorded shipment of California wine. The Los Angeles market was too small for his production, and he loaded a shipment on the Monsoon, bound for Northern California. By 1842, he made regular shipments to Santa Barbara, Monterey and San Francisco. By 1849, El Aliso, was the most extensive vineyard in California. Vignes owned over 40,000 vines and produced 150,000 bottles, or 1000 barrels, per year. As a prominent citizen of Los Angeles, Jean-Louis Vignes met and entertained such well known men as General William Tecumseh Sherman, Thomas Larkin, William Heath Davis and Thomas ap Catesby Jones. His wine was drunk all over California and samples were sent to President Tyler in Washington, D.C. and to France.

== Wine industry during California Gold Rush ==
The California Gold Rush (1848–1855) had a major effect on the geography, economy, and history of wine growing in California. The discovery of gold in 1848 at Sutter's Mill triggered the wine industry of California. The Gold Rush brought an influx of people to Northern California, many of whom arrived and settled in San Francisco whose population grew from 1,000 to 25,000 between January 1848 and December 1849. This resulted in a significant increase in demand for wine and spurred wine production in the area within 100 miles (161 km) of San Francisco. In the early 1850, local wineries mainly supplied gold miners. The 1850s saw planting and wine production expand in earnest in many parts of Northern California, including in Santa Clara, Sacramento, Sutter, Yuba, Butte, Trinity, El Dorado, Lake, Napa, Sonoma and Merced Counties. Many of these are still major centers of wine cultivation and production.

Established in 1852, Old Almaden Winery in Santa Clara Valley was the oldest winery in California and the site is designated as a California Historical Landmark designated July 31, 1953. The historic wine production site in Santa Clara County was situated on the eastern slopes of the Santa Cruz Mountains where today resides winemakers and growers of the Santa Clara Valley AVA. On this site, in 1852, Charles LeFranc made the first commercial planting of fine European wine grapes in Santa Clara County to found Almaden Vineyards. The winery is no longer in operation and the Almaden Vineyards company moved to Madera, California. In 1878, pioneering winemaker Paul Masson left France for California, and ended up becoming winemaker at Almaden Vineyards and Wine company, leading to his other pioneering wine and champagne vintner pursuits in the Santa Clara Valley and Santa Cruz Mountains.

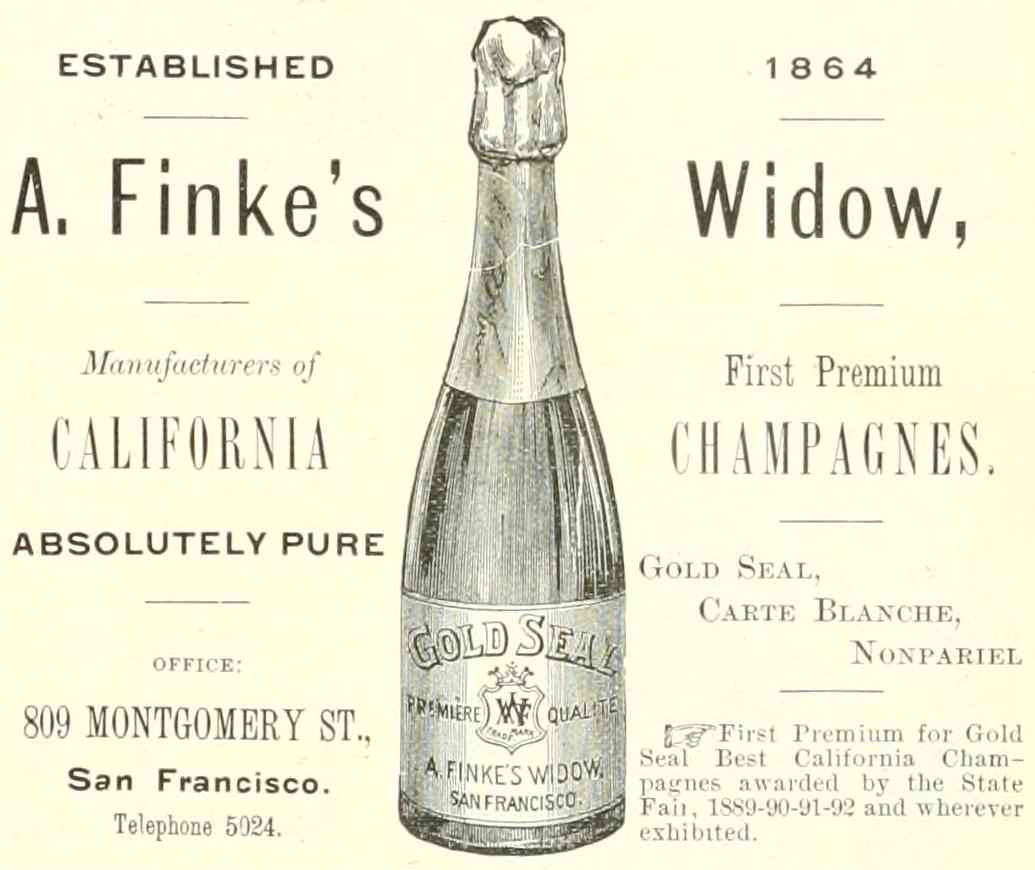
Gold Seal "Champagne" California sparkling wine made by A. Finke's Widow, 1892 ad in Pacific Wine and Spirit Review

In the 1850s and 1860s, Agoston Haraszthy, a Hungarian soldier, merchant and promoter, made several trips to import cuttings from 165 of the greatest European vineyards to California. Some of this endeavor was at his personal expense and some through grants from the state. Considered one of the founders of the California wine industry, Haraszthy contributed his enthusiasm and optimism for the future of wine, along with considerable personal effort and risk. He founded Buena Vista Winery and promoted vine planting over much of Northern California. He dug extensive caves for cellaring, promoted hillside planting, fostered the idea of non-irrigated vineyards and suggested redwood for casks when oak supplies ran low.

Nurseymen like A.P. Smith in Sacramento imported grape varieties and experimented to find which were best suited for the California climate. Smith listed 24 grape varieties he was propagating in a sales catalog in 1856 and he exhibited "Zeinfindall" at the state fair in 1858.

As home to both Buena Vista Winery, California's second-oldest commercial winery, and Gundlach Bundschu winery, California's oldest family-run winery, the Sonoma Valley is known as the birthplace of the California wine industry.

Universalist minister Thomas Lake Harris also established his utopian commune of Fountain Grove in Sonoma County, just north of Santa Rosa with 375 acres (152 ha) of grapes in 1875. The vineyard was managed by Japanese immigrant, Nagasawa Kanaye, whom Harris left the estate to in 1891, and growing the vineyard to 2,000 acres (809 ha), producing 200,000 US gallons (757,082 L) of Cabernet, Pinot Noir, and Zinfandel per year. Known as the "Grape King of California", Nagasawa was one of the biggest winemakers in the state, frequently hosting notable figures such as John Muir, Thomas Edison, Henry Ford, and others to lavish dinners through Prohibition where Fountaingrove's cellars continued to flow freely. Nagasawa remained at Fountaingrove until his death at 1934, where despite naming his American born grand-nephew and grand-niece as heirs, the state seized the land, broke it up, and sold it at auction under the California Alien Land Law of 1913, which prohibited Asian immigrants from owning agricultural land due to rising anti-Asian sentiment at the time.

Although George Yount planted a small vineyard in Napa Valley in the mid-1830s, John Patchett planted the first commercial vineyard in Napa Valley in 1854 and established the first winery there in 1858. In 1861 Charles Krug who previously had worked for Agoston Haraszthy and Patchett founded his namesake winery in St. Helena and began making his own wine. Originally a Prussian political dissident, Krug learned the trade of the vintner as an apprentice to Haraszthy in the Sonoma Valley. The land on which Krug founded his winery was part of his wife's (Carolina Bale's) dowry. Krug became an important leader of winemaking in the Napa Valley. He was also a mentor for Karl Wente, Charles Wetmore and Jacob Beringer, all of whom became important vintners.

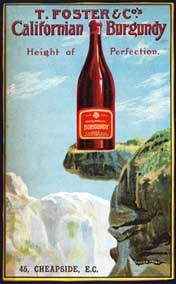
Californian Burgundy, 1906 poster from the London wine merchants showing a bottle on Glacier Point, Yosemite

In 1863, species of native American grapes were taken to Botanical Gardens in England. These cuttings carried a species of root louse called phylloxera which attacks and feeds on the vine roots and leaves. Phylloxera is indigenous to North America and native vine varieties had developed resistance. European vines had no such evolutionary protection. By 1865, phylloxera had spread to vines in Provence. Over the next 20 years, it inhabited and decimated nearly all the vineyards of Europe. Many methods were attempted to eradicate phylloxera but all proved temporary and none economical.

Finally Thomas V. Munson, a Texan horticulturist, suggested grafting the European vinifera vines onto American riparia rootstocks. So, there began a long, laborious process of grafting every wine vine in Europe over to American rootstocks. It was only in this manner that the European wine industry could be retrieved from extinction.

In the 1870s, El Dorado County was California's third-largest wine-producing area. In 1879 Captain Gustave Niebaum established Inglenook Winery in Rutherford, California a small Napa County village. It was the first Bordeaux style winery in the USA as Captain Niebaum's wines became world-renowned. His Inglenook wines won gold medals at the Paris Exposition Universelle in 1889.

During the period when the Europeans were contending with phylloxera, the American wine industry was flourishing. By 1900, America had a fully developed and proud commercial wine producing business. Many California wines received medals in European competitions. Barrels of California wine were being regularly exported to Australia, Canada, Central America, England, Germany, Mexico and Asia.

== Prohibition ==
The destruction of the American wine industry would come not from phylloxera but from Prohibition in the United States. Thirty-three states had gone dry at the outbreak of World War I. Wartime Prohibition was enacted in 1919, followed by the Volstead National Prohibition Act and the 18th Amendment to the U.S. Constitution in 1920, forbidding the "manufacture, sale, or transportation of intoxicating liquors."

Through a loophole allowing each home to "make 200 gallons of non-intoxicating cider and fruit juice per year," thousands of otherwise law-abiding citizens became home winemakers and bootleggers. Prices for fresh grapes shot up, because of the increased demand and a railroad shortage of refrigerated freight cars in which to ship them.

Growers began replanting fine wine variety vineyards to juice grape varieties that shipped well. The massive plantings produced a constant surplus of low-quality grapes that persisted until 1971.

By the time of National Repeal, effective December 5, 1933, the industry was in ruins. Although some wineries managed to survive by obtaining permits to make wines used for medicinal, sacramental and non-beverage additive purposes, production dropped 94% from 1919 to 1925.

California had 713 bonded wineries before Prohibition; it took more than half a century, until 1986, before that many were again operating.

Prohibition left a legacy of distorting the role of alcohol in American life and ruining a fledgling world-class wine industry, which took decades of work to overcome. Research at the University of California at Davis and Fresno State University greatly assisted the new breed of vintners who arrived in California in the 1960s and who were committed to producing wine of the highest international standards.

== Wine revolution ==
André Tchelistcheff is generally credited with ushering in the modern era of winemaking in California. Beaulieu Vineyards (BV) founder and owner Georges de Latour hired Tchelisticheff in 1938. He introduced several new techniques and procedures, such as aging wine in small French Oak barrels, cold fermentation, vineyard frost prevention, and malolactic fermentation.

Brother Timothy, a member of Institute of the Brothers of the Christian Schools, was also instrumental in the creation of the modern wine industry. After an earlier career as a teacher, he transferred to the order's Mont La Salle located on Mount Veeder in the Mayacamas Mountains west of Napa in 1935 to become the wine chemist for the order's expanding wine operations. The Christian Brothers had grown grapes since 1882 and made wine in Martinez, California. During Prohibition they legally made sacramental wine. In 1932, they relocated to Napa, and returned to commercial production of wine and brandy following the repeal of Prohibition. The science teacher was a fast learner and soon established Christian Brothers as one of the leading brands in the state's budding wine industry.

In 1965, Robert Mondavi broke away from his family's Charles Krug estate to found his own in Oakville, California. It was the first new large-scale winery to be established in the valley since before prohibition. Following the establishment of the Mondavi estate, the number of wineries in the valley continued to grow, as did the region's reputation.

Some California wine makers began to produce quality wines but still had difficulty marketing them. Frank Schoonmaker, a prominent journalist and wine writer of the 1950s and 1960s introduced the German idea of labeling wines using varietal (Pinot noir, Chardonnay, Riesling) rather than semi-generic names borrowed from famous European regions (Burgundy, Chablis, Rhine, etc.). Robert Mondavi was one of the first to label the majority of his wines by varietal names and was tireless in promoting the practice.

By the late 1960s and early 1970s, the quality of some California wines was outstanding but few took notice as the market favored French brands. On May 24, 1976, a watershed event in the viticulture industry occurred to celebrate the United States Bicentennial. British wine connoisseur, merchant and founder of France's first private wine school, L’Academie du Vin, Steven Spurrier, with American Patricia Gallagher, organized the Paris Wine Tasting of 1976 where renown French oenophiles participated in a blind tasting to compare the best wines from California's wine regions and France's prestigious Bordeaux and Burgundy regions. After the judges compared ten Chardonnays (white) vintages, six Californians and four French, the California wines placed three of the top four. Six of the nine judges ranked Chateau Montelena's '73 vintage number one; Chalone Vineyard came in third and Spring Mountain Vineyard fourth. When ten Cabernet Sauvignons (red), six Californians and four French, were sniffed, sipped, swished and spat, Stag's Leap Wine Cellars' '73 vintage ranked number one.

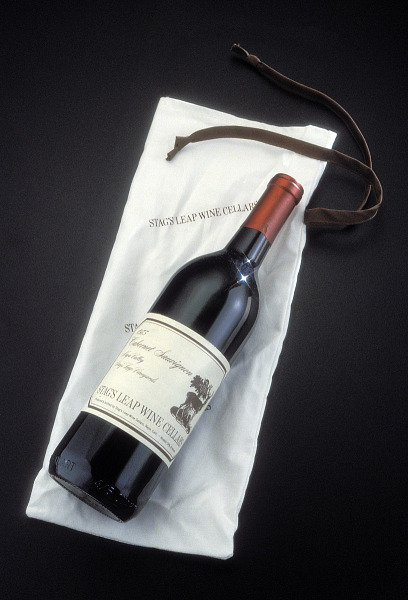
1973 Stag's Leap Wine Cellars Cabernet Sauvignon

George Taber, the sole journalist who attended the event, penned the article Judgment of Paris in Time magazine reporting the shocking results with the California wines sweeping primer French vintages according to local judges. As Jim Barrett, general manager/part owner of Chateau Montelena said: "Not bad for kids from the sticks." The 1976 event led to expanding the recognition and prestige of vintners in the New World, specifically, the Golden State.

The San Francisco Wine Tasting of 1978 was conducted 20 months after the seminal Paris Wine Tasting. Spurrier flew in from Paris to participate in the evaluations, which were held at the Vintners Club. The California wines swept the rankings in both red and white categories.

Wine critics argued that French reds would age better than the California reds, so this was tested. The same red vintages judged in 1976 were submitted on the tenth anniversary of the Paris Wine Tasting at the French Institute Wine Tasting of 1986 and the Wine Spectator Wine Tasting of 1986. White wines were not evaluated on the belief that they were past their prime. At both events, a California vintage was declared champion, while the French entries received lower rankings than 1976.

The pearl anniversary event organized by Steven Spurrier, on both sides of the Atlantic Ocean, was entitled, The Tasting that Changed the Wine World: 'The Judgment of Paris' 30th Anniversary, occurring simultaneously on 24 May 2006 at the Copia in Napa, California, and at Berry Bros. & Rudd, Britain's oldest wine merchant, in London, England. Five Californian reds finished in the top spots before the highest-ranked Bordeaux, a 1970 Château Mouton-Rothschild, placed sixth. Ridge Vineyards' 1971 Monte Bello received the number one honor.

In Oz Clarke's New Encyclopedia of Wine, Mr. Clarke writes that California "was the catalyst and then the locomotive for change that finally pried open the ancient European wineland's rigid grip on the hierarchy of quality wine and led the way in proving that there are hundreds if not thousands of places around the world where good to great wine can be made." He observes that "until the exploits of California's modern pioneers of the 1960s and '70's, no-one had ever before challenged the right of Europe's, and in particular, France's vineyards, to be regarded as the only source of great wine in the world."

Fred Franzia and his Bronco Wine Company has caused waves in the business of California wine marketing. The company's low priced Charles Shaw wine which is sold exclusively by Trader Joe's markets along with the company's other labels have attracted new entry level wine consumers to the fold but also has alienated many of the smaller vintners in the state by placing some downward pressure on pricing.

Newer regions, producing award-winning wines, entered the California wine industry, including Temecula Valley county in the south, the Santa Barbara County in the Central Coast, and the Red Hills Lake County AVA in the north.

In the early 21st century, vintners have begun reviving heirloom grape varieties, such as Trousseau Gris and Valdiguié.

== See also ==
- Wineries in California
- California cult wines
- Wine Institute
- History of California bread
