= Gustavo Brambila =

Mexican-American winemaker

- Born: 1953 (age 72–73); Jalisco, Mexico
- Occupation: Winemaker

Gustavo Brambila (born 1953) is a Mexican-American winemaker in the Napa Valley.

== Early life ==
He was born in Jalisco, Mexico in 1953 and moved with his family to Rutherford in the Napa Valley in 1957.

== Career ==
Brambila earned a degree in fermentation science at the University of California, Davis, one of the first Latinos to do so. In 1976 he was hired by Mike Grgich at Chateau Montelena where he assisted in quality control. He joined just after the events covered in Bottle Shock. Brambila followed Grgich when Grgich Hills Cellar was created in 1977. He worked there for 23 years before leaving in 1999 to become the general manager and winemaker at Peju Province Winery.

In 1996, he teamed up with Thrace Bromberger to form Gustavo Wine, which was making 3,800 cases in 2004 and 7,000 cases in 2008. They produce a mix of Merlot, Zinfandel, Sauvignon Blanc, Barbera, Pinot Noir, Chardonnay, Petite Sirah and Cabernet Sauvignon. They also own the Napa Wine Merchants cooperative tasting room as well as several thousand acres in the Chiles Valley.

Since 2002, he has consulted with Taylor Family Vineyards on their Cabernet Sauvignon. In 2008, he began crafting private label wines for the Wine Pod, an automated wine presser and fermenter.

== Bottle Shock ==
Brambila was portrayed by Freddy Rodriguez in the 2008 indie film Bottle Shock. In the film, the character is directly involved in the 1976 tasting although in reality, he was not. He worked in the lab on quality control. Brambila spent time with Rodriguez before filming. Since the film was released, there has been a noticeable increase in business at his winery.
