= Bo Barrett =

American winemaker

- Born: James P. Barrett
- Occupation: Winemaker
- Employer: Chateau Montelena
- Spouse: Heidi Barrett
- Children: 3
- Parent: Jim Barrett

Bo Barrett (born James P. Barrett) is the current CEO of Chateau Montelena. He is the son of Jim Barrett, under whose ownership the 1973 vintage Chardonnay won first place among white wines at the Paris Wine Tasting of 1976, later known as the Judgment of Paris. Barrett was an assistant during that vintage, working under the tutelage of Mike Grgich. He is married to Heidi Barrett, former wine maker at Screaming Eagle Winery and Vineyards.

In the 2008 film Bottle Shock, a fictionalized account of the Judgment of Paris wine tasting, Bo Barrett was portrayed by actor Chris Pine.
