= Heidi Barrett =

American winemaker

- Born: Heidi Peterson; Berkeley, California
- Education: University of California, Davis (B.S.)
- Occupation: Winemaker
- Years active: 1983 - present
- Employer(s): Barrett & Barrett
- Spouse: Bo Barrett
- Children: Remi and Chelsea
- Parent(s): Richard and Diane Petersen

Heidi Peterson Barrett is an American winemaker and entrepreneur who has been responsible for some of California's most notable cult wines. Her career has included stints at Screaming Eagle, Dalla Valle Vineyards, Paradigm Winery, Grace Family Vineyards, Amuse Bouche, Lamborn Family, Showket Vineyards, Revana Family Vineyards, Vineyard 29 and Fantesca Estate & Winery. Barrett is a consultant for Elizabeth Spencer and has her own wine label, La Sirena.

== Early years and education ==
Barrett was born in Berkeley, California to parents Richard and Diane Peterson. Her father was an influential winemaker who worked for several wineries including E & J Gallo Winery in Modesto, California and Beaulieu Vineyards in St. Helena, California where he worked under Andre Tchelistcheff.

Barrett attended grade school in Modesto before her family moved to the Napa Valley. and graduated from UC Davis in 1980 with a B.Sc. in Fermentation Science. She was one of only four women in her graduating class of 30.

== Career ==
Following internships in both the German and Australian wine industries, Barrett became head winemaker for Buehler Vineyards in 1983 at age 25. In 1988, at age 30, Barrett left Buehler and struck out on her own as a winemaker consultant. Her first consulting client was Dalla Valle, and she worked with her proprietor Gustav Dalla Valle to earn her first two 100-point scores from Wine Advocate's Robert Parker.

After achieving success with Dalla Valle, Barrett began working with Jean Phillips of Screaming Eagle in Napa Valley. Phillips was the realtor for her first client Gustav Dalla Valle, and began working with Barrett on a casual, hourly basis. This brand took off in the early 1990s, and following the 1992 vintage of Screaming Eagle, Barrett became a "winemaking star".

Barrett then began working as winemaker for Ren Harris of Paradigm Winery, and continued to grow her career from there. As Barrett's children grew up, she was able to devote more time to her winemaking career.

Wine critic Robert Parker has awarded her wines 100 points five times and called her "The First Lady of Wine" as well as "the Queen of Cult Cabernet."

== Personal life ==
Barrett is married to Bo Barrett, the winemaker at Chateau Montelena She has two daughters; Remi and Chelsea. She is an avid scuba diver, painter, and helicopter pilot.

== See also ==
- List of wine personalities
