= Christopher Mangum =

American painter

Christopher Mangum, sometimes referred to as Christopher M. and known as the “Painter of Chefs”, is a contemporary oil painter who lives in San Diego, California. His artwork encompasses the culinary arts and viticulture which has sparked the interest of foodies nationwide. He gains inspiration for his paintings by visiting the kitchens of many renowned chefs, such as Charlie Trotter.

== Early life ==
While a senior in high school, Mangum won an art competition that granted him a semester scholarship to art school. He graduated from San Francisco's Academy of Art University with a Bachelor of Fine Arts degree in 2000. He was a member of the San Francisco Society of Illustrators.

== Style ==
Having studied many styles of art and admiring classical artists, Mangum focuses on letting a classical style show in a more modern way. This mixture of styles results in a traditional Realist style with many hints of Impressionism. Artists that influence Christopher's work are 19th-century artists such as John Singer Sargent and Edgar Degas. References of these styles can be seen in his chosen subject matter of culinary chefs. Christopher chooses to paint culinary life because he feels the chef's character can tell many stories and he sees the similarities between chefs and artists.

"One thing that draws me to painting the chefs that I meet is that I notice so many similarities with what the chefs do as artists and what I do myself as an artist."

Clothing such as smocks or aprons is one similarity and the mixing of textures and colors is another. The culinary subjects are all painted in a similar style which has many Impressionistic qualities in the abstraction of forms and bright bold colors used. While experimenting with texture and brushstrokes that leave visual impressions on the canvas, Christopher shows a great deal of emotion in his work. “I think that art should be an expression of personality,” Christopher M. says. “I want to create paintings that address things that are important in life, not just paint pretty pictures. My work is a celebration of life, and it feeds my spiritually.”

== Exhibitions ==
- “Savor the Moment”, New York Art Expo (2008–2009)
- United Kingdom Tour (2008)

== Selected works ==
- Painted Heidi Barrett of Screaming Eagle Winery and Vineyards
- Painted Pam Starr of Crocker & Starr Winery
- Painted Sommelier Jesse Rodriquez of Addison Restaurant
- Painted Thomas Keller of The French Laundry
- Painted Charlie Trotter
- Painted Ludo Lefebvre
- Painted Kevin Rathbun
- Painted William Bradley of Addison Restaurant
- Painted Francois Payard
- Painted Gavin Kaysen

== Awards and honors ==
- (2008) Official Poster Artist, International Artexpo Las Vegas
- Celebrity Artist & Poster Artist for the San Diego Bay Wine & Food Festival
- Poster Artist for the Oregon Food & Wine Festival
- Artist to Watch by ‘’Art Business News’’.
- Today's Top Artist (2010) by Art Business News.
