= Bruce Sherman =

American businessman, owner of the Miami Marlins

- Born: May 1948 (age 78)
- Education: University of Rhode Island (B.A.); Baruch College (MBA)
- Occupation: Businessman
- Known for: Co-founder of Private Capital Management; Owner of the Miami Marlins
- Spouses: Marlene Bluestein (divorced); Cynthia Kahn (m. 1999)
- Children: Two

Bruce S. Sherman (born May 1948) is an American businessman and co-founder of the wealth-management firm Private Capital Management and the chairman and majority owner of the Miami Marlins of Major League Baseball (MLB).

== Early life ==
Sherman was raised in a middle-class neighborhood in Queens, New York, the son of Sylvia and Michael Sherman. His mother was a school teacher in New York public schools. He has two brothers, Peter and Joel. He graduated with a B.A. from the University of Rhode Island and received a M.B.A. from Baruch College. After college, he worked for the accounting firm Arthur Young. At the age of 29, Sherman was recruited by an executive search firm to be chief financial officer for a company owned by the Collier family.

== Career ==
In 1985, Sherman co-founded the wealth-management firm Private Capital Management (PCM) whose initial client was the Collier family. PCM expanded its customer base to include government agencies, colleges and universities. In 1997, PCM sold International Dairy Queen (1997) to investor Warren Buffett for $585 million. The firm grew to $4.4 billion in assets under Sherman's management in 1999.

In 2001, Sherman sold PCM to Legg Mason for $1.4 billion. Sherman remained at the firm's helm and sold two additional companies to Buffett: Shaw Industries in 2001 for $2.1 billion and Garan (the maker of Garanimals) in 2002 for $270 million. Over the years, some of his successes include investments in Qualcomm Inc, Apple Computer, International Game Technology, Banknorth and Charter One Financial.

By 2005, PCM had $31 billion in assets. This was reduced to $2.4 billion by 2009 after several bad investments in newspaper companies (Knight Ridder, The New York Times Company, and Gannett), combined with a $478.6 million loss in their investment in Bear Stearns (which collapsed in 2008). Sherman retired in 2009 stating "I am very proud of my investment career over 23 years, especially the first 22 years."

In August 2017, Sherman led a business group, which included former professional sports players Michael Jordan and Derek Jeter, that purchased the Miami Marlins of Major League Baseball from Jeffrey Loria for $1.2 billion. After disagreements about the team's direction, Jeter relinquished his 4% share of the team in February 2022.. In 2026, the Sun Sentinel reported that Bruce Sherman’s net worth was approximately US$3 billion. This puts him as the 10th wealthiest MLB team owner tied with Jim Crane of the Houston Astros and John Fisher of the Athletics.

== Philanthropy ==
Sherman and his wife support various charities including the Naples Winter Wine Festival which benefits the Naples Children and Education Fund. In 2016, the couple founded the Sherman Prize which awards prizes to those who have made advances in the fight against inflammatory bowel diseases including ulcerative colitis and Crohn's disease (of which both his daughters are afflicted). The Shermans endowed the Bruce and Cynthia Sherman Professorship of Urology Research and Innovation at New York University. His wife is a founder of the Holocaust Museum of Southwest Florida in Naples.

== Personal life ==
In 1999, he married Cynthia Kahn in Manhattan. He has two daughters from a previous marriage to Marlene Bluestein.
