= Grace Family Vineyards =

Vineyard and winery in Napa, California

- Location: Saint Helena, California, United States
- Wine region: Napa Valley
- Appellation: St Helena AVA
- Other labels: Cornelius Grove Vineyard, Reliquus
- First vines planted: 1976
- First vintage: 1978
- Key people: Kathryn Green, owner; Helen Keplinger, winemaker
- Cases/yr: 1000
- Varietal: Cabernet Sauvignon
- Other products: Olive oil
- Website: http://www.gracefamilyvineyards.com

The Grace Family Vineyards is a vineyard and winery in Napa, California. It is widely regarded as one of the original cult wineries in the Napa Valley, and was the first American winery to use the word "family" in its name.

Today the winery manages two estate vineyards with distinct geologies in the St Helena AVA, separated by the West Napa Fault line. Grace estate was formed by a discrete volcanic event 5 million years ago, whereas Heath Canyon Ranch (home to the Cornelius Grove and Heath Canyon vineyards) was formed by a combination of volcanic and fluvial activity some 100 million years ago.

Production has remained very limited.

In 2014, Helen Keplinger took over as winemaker. In 2019, Kathryn Green became the custodian of Grace Family Vineyards.

Some forty years after the first release, the Grace Family Estate and the Cornelius Grove Vineyard wines were both awarded 100 points by Antonio Galloni and James Suckling respectively, with the former also choosing Helen Keplinger as his winemaker of the year.

A third wine, Reliquus, has been produced since 2016, a blend of grapes from the winery's two estate vineyards, farmed to the same standard as the vineyard designate wines, it is aimed as an expression of the vintage as opposed to the distinct terroir, with the intent of being drunk earlier as such it is often found on wine lists of prominent restaurants.

== History ==
The winery began when Ann and Dick Grace planted one acre (0.40 hectares) of vines in 1976. The first vintage was produced in 1978, at Chuck Wagner's winery, Caymus. A second acre was added in 1985, but phylloxera took its toll, as the winery's vines were planted on non-resistant rootstock. Additional problems with oak root fungus in the original acre caused the need to replant the entirety in 1995. The winery's yield dropped from 350 cases in the to a low of 48 cases in 1996, when the wine was allocated as one 1-liter bottle per customer on the winery's mailing list. Another acre of planting and re-planted vines in the old acreage brought production up to 150 cases in 1998.

=== Charity ===
The winery's mission statement is "Wine as a catalyst towards healing our planet." The programs of the Grace Family Vineyards Foundation are primarily in India, Nepal, Mexico, Tibet, and America.

Grace Family wines has been involved with the Naples Winter Wine Festival since its first year in 2001. In 2006, a 12-liter Balthazar of 2003 Grace Family Cabernet drew $90,000 ($140,378 in 2024 dollars) in bids at the festival's charity auction. For the 2012 charity auction, a Balthazar of both Grace Family and their second label, Blank, drew a $160,000 ($219,139 in 2024 dollars) bid.

== Vineyard and winemaking ==
The Grace Family properties are organic and biodynamically farmed.

Gary Galleron was head winemaker between 1988 and 1995, when Heidi Peterson Barrett took over winemaking duties. Barrett, in turn, turned over duties to Gary Brookman. Helen Keplinger became winemaker in 2014 and continues to manage winegrowing at the estate alongside vineyard manager, David Abreu.
