= St. Supéry Estate Vineyards & Winery =

Coordinates: 38.455277°N 122.414159°W

St. Supéry Estate Vineyards & Winery is a 100% estate winery located in the Napa Valley of California, with a vineyard and winery in Rutherford, and a 1,531 acre ranch, Dollarhide, in the Napa Valley foothills.

The wines currently grown, produced, and bottled at St. Supéry include Cabernet Sauvignon and Sauvignon Blanc, along with Merlot, Cabernet Franc, Malbec, Petit Verdot, Chardonnay, Sémillon, and Moscato. St. Supéry also offers proprietary blends, Élu (red wine) and Virtú (white wine), made from Bordeaux varietal grapes. The winery also produces an eau de vie style spirit from their Moscato, named Andrew Jackson Dollarhide: Spirit of St. Supéry.

Founded by a long-established French winemaking family, Les vins skalli, the winery's history began in 1982 with the purchase of Dollarhide Ranch. Skalli Family Wines purchased an additional parcel in Rutherford in 1986, and began construction of a modern winery there. The winery officially opened its doors as St. Supéry in 1989. St. Supéry was acquired by Chanel in October, 2015.
