= Tubbs Cordage Company Office Building =

- U.S. National Register of Historic Places
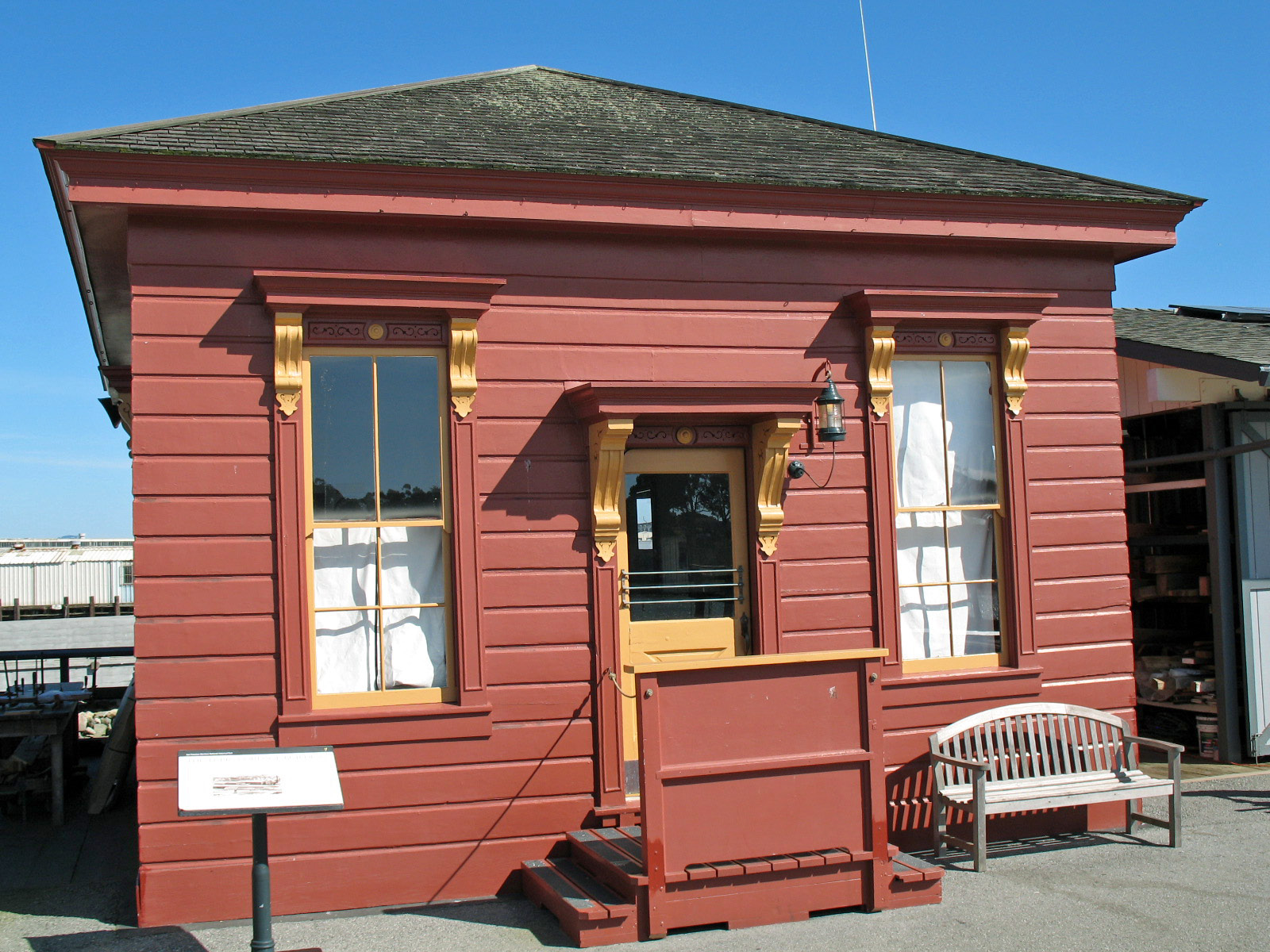

- Location within San Francisco County Location within California Location within the United States
- Location: Hyde St. Pier, San Francisco Maritime National Historical Park, San Francisco, California
- Coordinates: 37°48′35″N 122°25′11″W
- Built: 1890
- Architect: Tubbs Cordage Co.
- NRHP reference No.: 79000254
- Added to NRHP: November 6, 1979

The Tubbs Cordage Company Office Building is a small frame structure located in San Francisco Maritime National Historical Park, in the Fisherman's Wharf district of San Francisco, California.

== History ==
The 1890 structure was originally located at the Tubbs Cordage factory, at 611-613 Front Street, San Francisco. It was moved to Hyde Street Pier for display and preservation in 1963, and moved again in 1990.

The Tubbs Cordage Company Office is of local historical significance in the category of industry due to its association with the Tubbs Cordage Company and its rope factory founded in San Francisco by Alfred L. Tubbs and his brother Hiram where the first commercial manufacture of rope on the Pacific Coast was accomplished.

== Description ==
The office is a small, single-story, single-room office building (with the addition, after the historic period, of a small closet, with a sink and toilet, as well as an office cubicle). The exterior is painted a dark brownish-red, common on industrial buildings in the last century, and sometimes referred to as "mineral" red or "iron" red, with white trim. This was the color scheme of the office at the time of its move to Hyde Street Pier. The structure stands by itself at the pier, just as it did on the original site.

Rectangular in shape, the building dimensions are 21 by 26 feet. There is no basement, and the structure rests upon redwood sills. One story high, the building is framed with redwood siding.
