= Lee Paschich =

American vineyard owner and winemaker

- Born: September 13, 1914; Freestone, Sonoma County, California
- Died: October 5, 1993 (aged 79); Napa, California
- Occupation: Winery owner
- Years active: 1968-1993
- Known for: Part-Owner & General Manager at Chateau Montelena when their 1973 Chardonnay won the Judgment of Paris in 1976.
- Spouse: Helen Wunder

Leland J. "Lee" Paschich (September 13, 1914 – October 5, 1993) and his wife, Helen, purchased the Chateau Montelena property from Yort Frank in 1968. In 1972 Paschich sold 90 percent of the property, retaining a 10-percent stake, to winemaker Jim Barrett and his partners, remaining on board as general manager.
