= Oakville, California =

Oakville
- Census-designated place
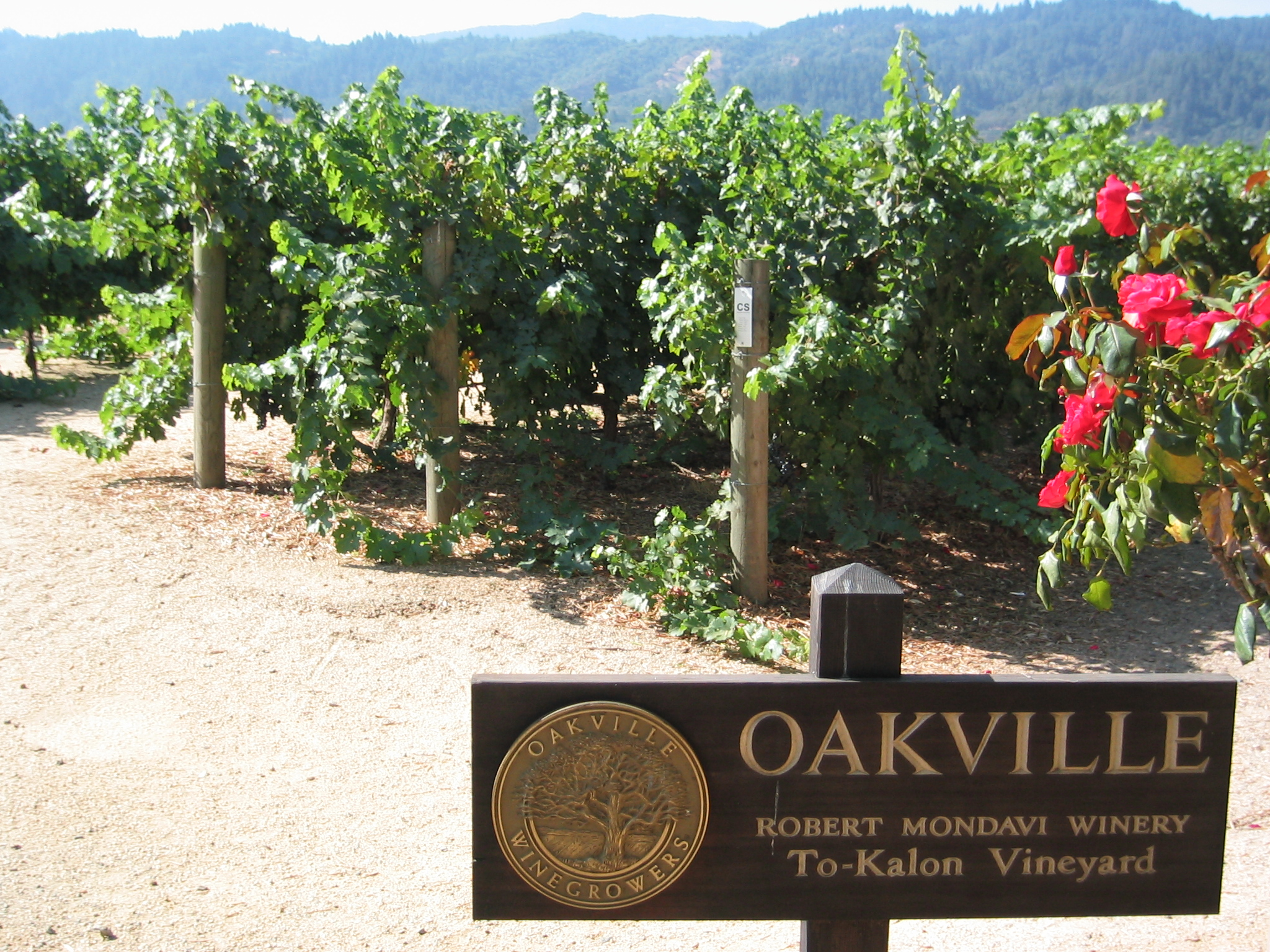
- To-Kalon Vineyard, Robert Mondavi Winery, Oakville, California

- Location within the state of California Oakville (the United States)
- Coordinates: 38°26′13″N 122°24′4″W
- Country: United States
- State: California
- County: Napa

Area
  - Total: 1.360 sq mi (3.522 km^{2})
  - Land: 1.360 sq mi (3.522 km^{2})
  - Water: 0 sq mi (0 km^{2}) 0%
- Elevation: 154 ft (47 m)

Population (2020)
  - Total: 49
  - Density: 36/sq mi (14/km^{2})
- Time zone: UTC-8 (Pacific (PST))
  - Summer (DST): UTC-7 (PDT)
- ZIP code: 94562
- Area code: 707
- GNIS feature IDs: 229899; 2583102

Oakville is a census-designated place (CDP) in the Napa Valley of Napa County, northern California, United States.

The population was 49 at the 2020 census. Oakville's ZIP Code is 94562, and it is located in area code 707.

The local economy is based on Napa Valley wine production, and Oakville was formally declared a distinct appellation within the Napa Valley AVA in 1993. There are currently 24 wineries and over 5,000 acres (20 km^{2}) of vineyard located within the boundary of the Oakville AVA, among them are the Robert Mondavi Winery, the Opus One Winery, and wineries of Heitz Wine Cellars and Screaming Eagle.

== History ==
Oakville started life in the 1860s as a water stop for the steam train owned by The Napa Valley Railroad Company. The railroad, founded by early California pioneer Samuel Brannan in 1864, shuttled tourists between ferry boats that docked in Vallejo to the resort town of Calistoga. The village gained its name from the dense groves of dark green valley oaks of the area.

H. W. Crabb turned Oakville from untamed country to wine country after his 1868 purchase of 240 acres (1.0 km^{2}) close to the Napa River. Crabb established a vineyard and winery naming it To Kalon, which in Greek means "the beautiful." By 1877 Crabb had planted 130 acres (0.5 km^{2}) and was producing 50,000 gallons of wine per year and by 1880, his vineyard had increased to 430 acres (1.7 km^{2}).

In 1903 the U.S. Department of Agriculture established an experimental vineyard station in Oakville. This vineyard known as "Oakville Station" is operated by the University of California, Davis. Formally declared a Napa appellation in 1993 there are currently 24 wineries and over 5,000 acres (20 km^{2}) of vineyard located within the boundary of the Oakville AVA. The Robert Mondavi Winery is located between Oakville and Rutherford, California (though its corporate headquarters are in nearby St. Helena). To Kalon was part of Mondavi's original inventory when it was established in 1965. Another Mondavi venture in Oakville is Opus One Winery. Heitz Wine Cellars' Martha's Vineyard is also located within the Oakville appellation.

Modern day tourists traveling on State Route 29 often include a stop at Oakville Grocery, one of the area's few non-winery business, in order to purchase picnic supplies. The Napa Valley Wine Train runs through Oakville on the same route that the original steam train ran on in the 19th century.

== Geography ==
According to the United States Census Bureau, the CDP covers an area of 1.4 square miles (3.5 km^{2}), all land. Historically, Oakville has been the location of a lode of quicksilver.

== Demographics ==
Historical population
| Census | Pop. | Note | %± |
|---|---|---|---|
| 2010 | 71 | | — |
| 2020 | 49 | | −31.0% |
U.S. Decennial Census; 2010

Oakville first appeared as a census designated place in the 2010 U.S. census.

The 2020 United States census reported that Oakville had a population of 49. The population density was 36.0 inhabitants per square mile (13.9/km^{2}). The racial makeup of Oakville was 24 (49%) White, 0 (0%) African American, 1 (2%) Native American, 0 (0%) Asian, 1 (2%) Pacific Islander, 12 (24%) from other races, and 11 (22%) from two or more races. Hispanic or Latino of any race were 25 persons (51%).

There were 29 households, and the average household size was 1.69. The median age was 51.5 years.

There were 37 housing units, of which 29 (78%) were occupied. Of these, 8 (28%) were owner-occupied, and 21 (72%) were occupied by renters.

== Government ==
On the Napa County Board of Supervisors Oakville is in District 3 and is represented by Anne Cottrell.

In the California State Legislature, Oakville is in the 3rd senatorial district, represented by Democrat Christopher Cabaldon, and in the 4th Assembly district, represented by Democrat Cecilia Aguiar-Curry.

In the United States House of Representatives, Oakville is in California's 4th congressional district, represented by Democrat Mike Thompson.

== See also ==
- Oakville AVA
