= Grgich Hills Estate =

Winery in California

Coordinates: 38.469819°N 122.432606°W

- Location: Rutherford, California, USA
- Appellation: Rutherford AVA
- Founded: 1977
- Key people: Mike Grgich, Winemaker, Proprietor/President & CEO; Ivo Jeramaz, Vice President of Vineyards and Production, Violet Grgich, Co-Proprietor/VP Operations, Sales & Marketing
- Known for: Grgich Hills Chardonnay
- Varietals: Chardonnay, Zinfandel, Sauvignon blanc, Cabernet Sauvignon, Merlot
- Distribution: International
- Tasting: Open to the public
- Website: http://www.grgich.com/

Grgich Hills Estate (formerly Grgich Hills Cellar) is a winery located in Rutherford, California in the heart of the Napa Valley. The winery changed its name in 2006 when it first began producing only "estate grown" wines made from grapes grown exclusively in vineyards owned by the winery. The Napa Valley Wine Train has a passenger stop located at Grgich Hills Estate. Grgich Hills' vineyards are certified organic and biodynamic and it converted to solar energy in 2006.

== History ==
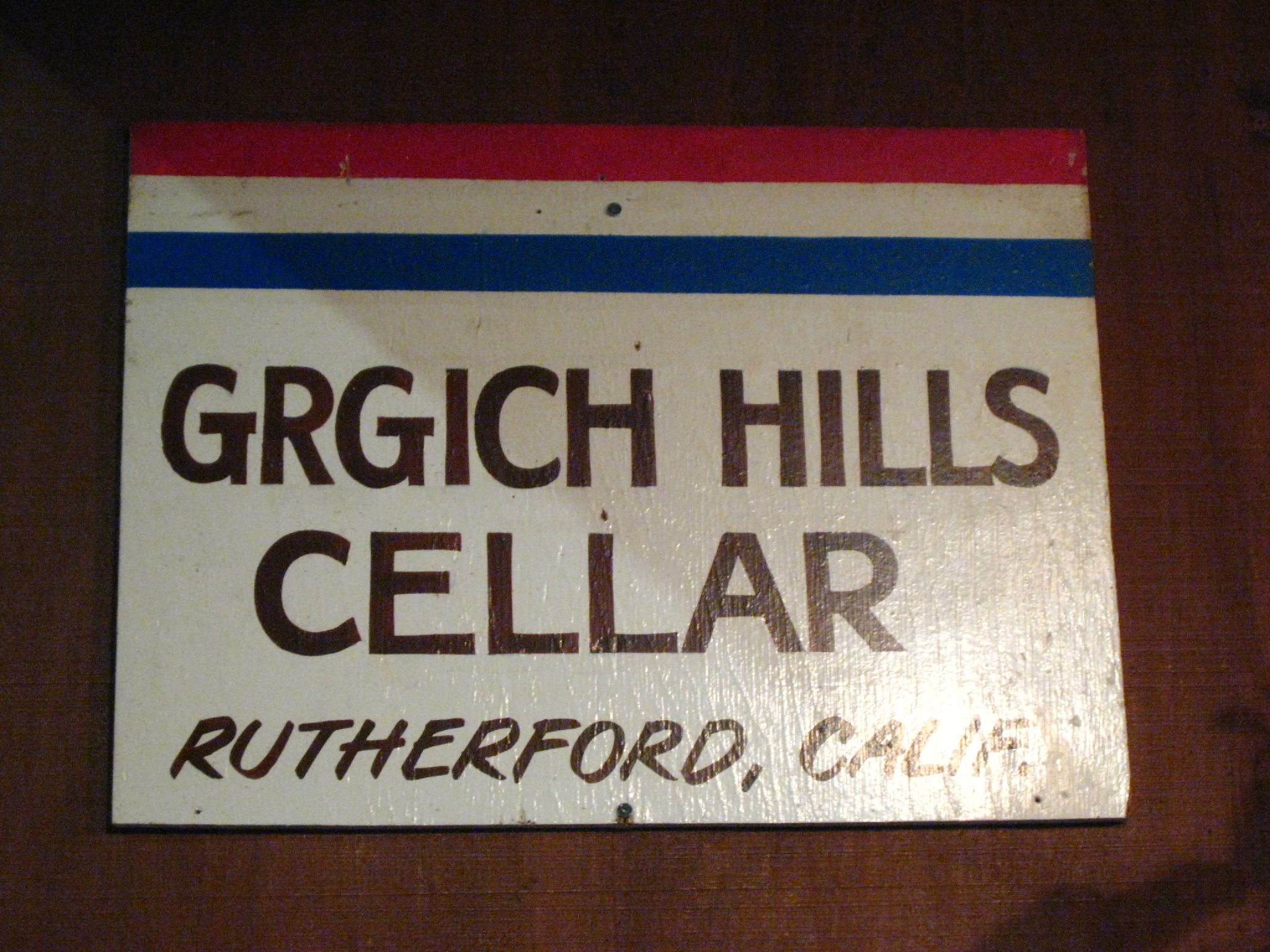

The colors in an early winery sign reflects Mike Grgich's Croatian heritage.

Winemaker Mike Grgich had gained international recognition at the historic Paris Wine Tasting of 1976 when the Chardonnay he produced at Chateau Montelena won first prize among white wines. Grgich and Austin Hills, of the Hills Brothers Coffee family, soon became business partners and established Grgich Hills Cellar on July 4, 1977. The name Grgich Hills did not describe a geographical feature but instead combined their family names.

== Wines ==
The winery's very first vintage was the winner of the 221-entry Chardonnay Shootout with wines from around the world. It was conducted by Craig Goldwyn, wine critic of the Chicago Tribune in 1980. Judges were mostly wine educators from around the nation gathered for the annual convention of the Society of Wine Educators.
