= John Jordan (vintner) =

American vintner and economist

Thomas John Jordan
- Education: Occidental College; Empire College School of Law; University of San Francisco
- Occupations: Vintner, economist, and political analyst
- Employer: Jordan Vineyard & Winery

John Jordan is an American vintner, economist and political analyst.

== Life and career ==
Jordan earned a bachelor's degree from Occidental College, a JD from Empire College School of Law, and an MBA from the University of San Francisco. Jordan became a licensed pilot at age 17 and holds an Airline Transport Pilot Certificate, as well as a Flight Instructor Certificate. Having logged more than 9,000 hours, Jordan also holds type ratings in Citation and Gulfstream aircraft. Jordan served in the United States Naval Reserve, rising to the rank of Commander. He has worked as an attorney and as a professor at Empire College School of Law. Jordan took over day-to-operations of Jordan Vineyard & Winery in 2005. He is a philanthropist and entrepreneur who created the John Jordan Foundation in 2012, which focuses on fighting the negative effects of poverty by funding wellness, education and technology programs for underfunded schools. Jordan also co-founded Labrador Omnimedia in 2011, which makes an iPad app for restaurants.

== Political activities ==
Early in his career, Jordan donated to Republican candidates. Jordan was the third most prolific donor to Super PACs in 2013. Jordan gained particular notoriety in 2014 for supporting Massachusetts Senate candidate Gabriel Gomez, spending over one million dollars to support a PAC that Jordan created to advocate for Gomez's election. In 2015, Jordan spent $130,000 through his own super PAC, named "Baby Got PAC", to support Republic presidential primary candidate Marco Rubio. Since 2016, John Jordan has not made any monetary donation to an individual politician. His contract as an economist and national security analyst on television prohibits him from doing so. Jordan attends the Republic National Convention every four years to lobby for two areas that he is passionate about: inequality of opportunity for all human beings and national security issues with regards to China and Russia. As is customary in either political party, attendees are expected to make a donation to the national committee for the convention, and Jordan made a donation in 2019 to participate in the Republican National Convention.

== Honors and awards ==
Since 2005, Jordan has received numerous awards for his philanthropic efforts.

- Hoover Institution Board of Overseers (since 2010)
- United Way of Northern California Philanthropist of the Year (2014)
- 10,000 Degrees Founders' Award (2015)
- North Bay Children's Center Champion of Children Award (2015)
- Sutter Health Catwalk for the Cure Pioneer Award (2016)
- North Bay Business Journal Community Philanthropy Award (2017)
- Northern Sonoma County Firefighters Honorary Firefighter of the Year (2018)
