= Freddy Rodriguez (actor) =

American actor and voice actor (born 1975)

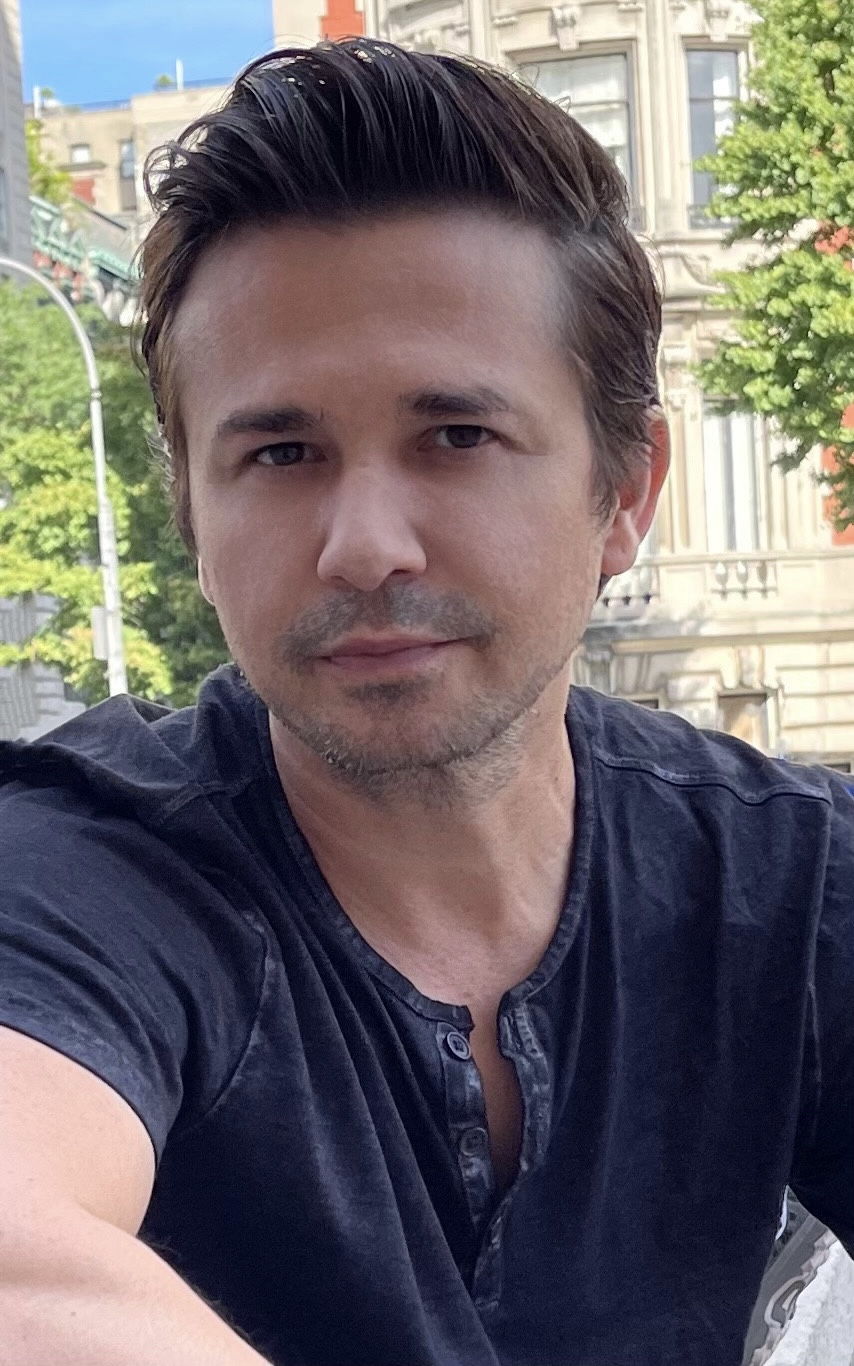
- Rodriguez in 2021
- Born: January 17, 1975 (age 51)
- Education: Lincoln Park High School
- Occupation: Actor
- Years active: 1993–present
- Spouse: Maria Elsie Rivera (m. 1995)
- Children: 2

Freddy Rodriguez (born January 17, 1975) is an American actor and voice actor. He had starring roles as Federico Diaz on Six Feet Under (2001–2005) and Benny Colon in Bull (2016–2021), as well as a recurring role as Gio on Ugly Betty (2007–2010). He voiced Angelo Lopez in the video game Saints Row and starred in the Robert Rodriguez film Planet Terror (2007). In addition to an Emmy nomination for Six Feet Under, he received two SAG Awards and four Imagen Awards for his work.

== Early life and education ==
Rodriguez attended Lincoln Park High School in Chicago and left for Hollywood shortly after graduation to take a role in his first film.

== Career ==
=== Film ===
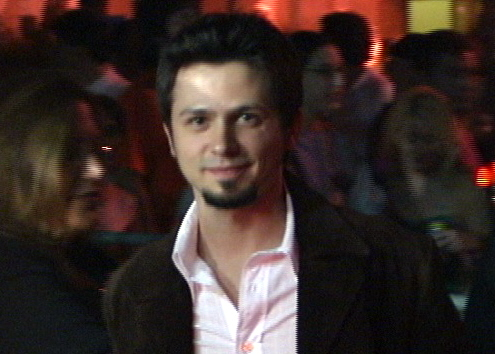
Rodriguez at the 2005 Toronto International Film Festival

One of Rodriguez' first films was in 1994 in A Walk in the Clouds, where he played Pedro "Peter" Aragon, Jr. During the 1990s, he also played a Vietnam veteran in Dead Presidents, and had roles as Ninja in The Pest, and as an obnoxious jock in Can't Hardly Wait.

In 2003, Rodriguez portrayed Victor, alongside Roselyn Sanchez in Chasing Papi (directed by Linda Mendoza). In 2005, he starred with Eva Longoria and Christian Bale in Harsh Times, his first leading role in a major theatrical release. In 2005, he also played a vicious inner-city drug dealer named Hector in Havoc, and a jockey in Dreamer, co-starring Dakota Fanning.

In 2006, Rodriguez appeared in M. Night Shyamalan's film Lady in the Water, portraying Reggie, a character who only exercised one half of his body. That same year, he also played a waiter in Poseidon, and busboy José Rojas in Bobby.

He starred as El Wray in Planet Terror, Robert Rodriguez's portion of the double-feature film Grindhouse (2007), and played the role of Gustavo Brambila in the true-life story Bottle Shock (2008).

Rodriguez starred in V/H/S/85 (2023), and in Blue Eyed Girl (initially titled Days When the Rains Came), a comedic drama that was released on November 21, 2025.

=== Television ===
Between 2001 and 2005, Rodriguez portrayed Federico Diaz on the hit HBO series Six Feet Under. For this role he received two Screen Actors Guild Awards for Best Ensemble in a Drama Series, an Emmy nomination for Best Supporting Actor in a Drama Series, and a further three SAG nominations (also in the ensemble category). In 2003, he made guest appearances as Carla's brother Marco Espinosa on Season 3 of Scrubs.

On July 13, 2007, Rodriguez was added to the cast of the ABC comedy series Ugly Betty, in which he played Giovanni Rossi, a sandwich shop owner who became the love interest for Betty Suarez (played by America Ferrera). He made his debut on the series at the start of the second season, appeared in an episode of the third season and reprised the role again late in the fourth season.

From 2016 to 2021, Rodriguez starred as attorney and former New York City prosecutor Benny Colón in the CBS courtroom drama Bull.

In 2023, he appeared in the final season of Hulu's Wu-Tang: An American Saga.

=== Other Work ===
As a voice actor since the year 2000, Rodriguez has voiced dozens of characters for television, movies and games. Among the most recognizable are the twin superheros Más y Menos (More and Less), who debuted in 2005 on Teen Titans. In 2006, he was the voice of Angelo Lopez in the popular video game Saints Row.

In 2007, Rodriguez featured prominently in the music video for the Santana song "Into the Night", and made a cameo appearance as a pilot/flight attendant in the music video for the song "Glamorous" by Fergie.

In 2008, alongside other celebrities, he was part of The Gap's holiday digital-advertising campaign, "Merry Mix It".

== Filmography ==
Key
†	Denotes films that have not yet been released

=== Film ===
Year	Title	Role	Notes
1994	The Fence	Young Terry Griff	
1995	A Walk in the Clouds	Pedro Aragon Jr.	
1995	Dead Presidents	Jose	
1996	Seduced by Madness: The Diane Borchardt Story	Michael Maldonado	
1997	The Pest	Ninja	
1998	Can't Hardly Wait	Jock	
1998	Shock Television	Eddie	
1998	Joseph's Gift	Joseph Keller	
1998	My Brother Jack	Joey Casale	
1999	Payback	Valet	
2000	For Love or Country: The Arturo Sandoval Story	Leonel	
2001	Beyond the City Limits	Topo	
2003	Dallas 362	Rubin	
2003	Victor and Eddie	Eddie	
2003	Chasing Papi	Victor	
2003	Pledge of Allegiance	Sean Macintyre	
2005	¡Mucha Lucha!: The Return of El Maléfico	El Silver Mask Jr., El Portero (voice)	Direct-to-video
2005	Harsh Times	Mike Alonzo	
2005	Dreamer	Manolin	
2005	Havoc	Hector	
2006	Scooby-Doo! Pirates Ahoy!	Rupert Garcia (voice)	Direct-to-video
2006	Bobby	Jose	
2006	Lady in the Water	Reggie	
2006	Poseidon	Marco Valentin	
2007	Grindhouse - Planet Terror	El Wray	
2008	Little Spirit: Christmas in New York	Leo's Father (voice)	
2008	Nothing like the Holidays	Jesse Rodriguez	
2008	Bottle Shock	Gustavo Brambila	
2009	Immigrants	Flaco (voice)	English dub
2012	Seal Team Six: The Raid on Osama Bin Laden	Trench	
2012	Soldiers of Fortune	Reed	
2013	CBGB	Idaho	
2014	Fort Bliss	Cpt. Garver	
2023	V/H/S/85	Detective Wayne Johnson	Segment: "Dreamkill"
2025	Blue Eyed Girl		
TBA	You Lose You Die †	TBA	Post-production

=== Television ===
Year	Title	Role	Notes
1999	Party of Five	Albert	3 episodes
1999	Oh, Grow Up	Deke	3 episodes
2001–2005	Six Feet Under	Federico Diaz	63 episodes
2003–2004	Scrubs	Marco Espinosa	3 episodes
2004	Static Shock	Fade, Tech (voice)	Episode: "Army of Darkness"
2004	Danny Phantom	Mayor Montez (voice)	Episode: "Public Enemies"
2005	American Dad!	Hector (voice)	Episode: "Not Particularly Desperate Housewife"
2005–2006	Teen Titans	Más y Menos (voice)	5 episodes
2007	ER	Simon	Episode: "Dying is Easy"
2007–2010	Ugly Betty	Gio	12 episodes
2010–2012	Handy Manny	Reuben Garcia (voice)	
2011	CHAOS	Rick Martinez	13 episodes
2011–2013	Generator Rex	Cesar Salazar (voice)	17 episodes
2013	Kaijudo	Hector Chavez (voice)	28 episodes
2013	Perception	Wesley Sumter	2 episodes
2013, 2019	Young Justice	Eduardo Dorado Jr. (voice)	
2014	Teen Titans Go!	Más y Menos (voice)	Episode: "Mas y Menos"
2014	Family Guy	Handy Manny (voice)	Episode: "Herpe the Love Sore"
2014–2015	The Night Shift	Dr. Michael Ragosa	22 episodes
2015	Ultimate Spider-Man	Miguel O'Hara / Spider-Man 2099 (voice)	2 episodes
2016–2021	Bull	Benny Colón	Main cast
2018	Elena of Avalor	El Mistico (voice)	Episode: "The Return of El Captain"
2023	Scavengers Reign	Terrence (voice)	2 episodes
2023	Wu-Tang: An American Saga	Detective Greco	Main cast

=== Video games ===
Year	Title	Role	Notes
2006	Saints Row	Angelo Lopez	
2011	Generator Rex: Agent of Providence	Cesar Salazar	
2013	LocoCycle	Pablo	
2025	Marvel's Deadpool VR	Headpool	

=== Music videos ===
Year	Artist	Title	Role
2007	Fergie	"Glamorous"	Flight Attendant
2007	Santana	"Into the Night"	Suicidal man

== Awards and nominations ==
=== ALMA Award ===
Year	Category	Work	Result
2002	Outstanding Actor in a Television Series	Six Feet Under	Nominated
2006	Outstanding Supporting Actor in a Television Series	Six Feet Under	Nominated
2009	Best of the Year in Film - Actor	Nothing like the Holidays	Nominated

=== Emmy Award ===
Year	Category	Work	Result
2002	Primetime Emmy Award for Outstanding Supporting Actor in a Drama Series	Six Feet Under	Nominated

=== Imagen Awards ===
Year	Category	Work	Result
2003	Best Supporting Actor - Television	Six Feet Under	Won
2004	Best Supporting Actor in a Television Drama	Six Feet Under	Won
2005	Best Supporting Actor - Television	Six Feet Under	Won
2006	Best Supporting Actor - Television	Six Feet Under	Nominated
2011	Best Actor/Television	CHAOS	Won

=== Screen Actors Guild Awards ===
Year	Category	Work	Result
2002	Outstanding Performance by an Ensemble in a Drama Series	Six Feet Under	Nominated
2003	Outstanding Performance by an Ensemble in a Drama Series	Six Feet Under	Won
2004	Outstanding Performance by an Ensemble in a Drama Series	Six Feet Under	Won
2005	Outstanding Performance by an Ensemble in a Drama Series	Six Feet Under	Nominated
2006	Outstanding Performance by an Ensemble in a Drama Series	Six Feet Under	Nominated
2007	Outstanding Performance by a Cast in a Motion Picture	Bobby	Nominated

== See also ==
- List of notable Puerto Ricans
