= Jim Barrett (winemaker) =

American winery owner

- Born: November 8, 1926; Chicago, Illinois, U.S.
- Died: March 14, 2013 (aged 86); San Francisco, California, U.S.
- Education: University of California, Los Angeles (BA); Loyola Marymount University (JD)
- Occupation: Winery owner
- Years active: 1972–1982
- Known for: Owner/producer at Chateau Montelena when their 1973 Chardonnay won the Judgment of Paris in 1976.
- Children: 5, including Bo

James L. Barrett (November 8, 1926 – March 14, 2013) was an American businessman and the owner of Chateau Montelena which won the Chardonnay competition of the 1976 Judgment of Paris wine tasting.

== Early life and education ==
Barrett was born November 8, 1926, in Chicago to Irish immigrants John and Margaret Barrett, who moved their family to Los Angeles in the 1930s. He spent his early years selling newspapers in Los Angeles before entering the United States Navy during World War II. He earned a Bachelor of Arts degree from the University of California, Los Angeles in 1946 and his Juris Doctor degree from Loyola Law School in 1950.

== Career ==
Barrett first purchased Chateau Montelena winery with Ernie Hahn in 1972 from Lee Paschich, retaining him as a general manager, and hired Mike Grgich to be his winemaker. Barrett uprooted the Chasselas, Alicante Bouschet, and Carignane that had been previously planted and replanted his acres with premium Cabernet Sauvignon. The winery purchased outsource Chardonnay grapes while waiting for the Cabernet vines to be ready. In 1982, he turned over winemaker duties to his son Bo Barrett.

Barrett was portrayed by Bill Pullman in the 2008 film Bottle Shock.

== Personal ==
Barrett died March 14, 2013, in San Francisco at age 86. He is survived by his wife of 33 years, Judy; his children from a previous marriage, Stephanie, Bo Barrett, Michael, Kevin and Gabriela; and five grandchildren.
