= Alfred L. Tubbs =

American winemaker

Alfred Lovering Tubbs
- Born: December 17, 1827; Deering, New Hampshire
- Died: December 26, 1896 (aged 69); San Francisco, California
- Occupation: California businessman
- Known for: Entrepreneur

Alfred Lovering Tubbs (1827-1896) was a pioneering entrepreneur who founded Chateau Montelena Winery in Calistoga, California.

== Early life ==
Alfred L. Tubbs was born in Deering, New Hampshire, on December 17, 1827. His parents were Michal and Mehitable Tubbs. Tubbs had an older brother named Hiram. Following the birth of Alfred, the family moved to Concord, New Hampshire.

== Career ==
After completing his grade school education, Tubbs decided to pursue a career in merchandising; first working at a wholesale grocery store in Baltimore, Maryland, before moving on to a bookkeeping job in Boston, Massachusetts. The firm that employed him sent him along with two ships bearing assorted cargoes to California in early 1850 following the California Gold Rush.

Tubbs foresaw the potential for commercial growth upon his arrival in San Francisco, and along with his brother Hiram decided to establish a chandlery business, which became successful. In 1858 they partnered with a mercantile firm and established a cordage factory named the San Francisco Cordage Company in the Potrero Hill district of the city. The name of the firm was later changed to Tubbs Cordage Company. This business also became successful by serving the needs of shipping, farming, building and mining industries. Tubbs was elected to the California State Senate in 1865 and served one term in office. The brothers also built a large hotel near Lake Merritt in Oakland in 1870.

In 1882, Alfred Tubbs purchased two properties totaling 322 acres (130 ha) in Napa County near Calistoga and built a large home and winery, naming it Hillcrest Estate. Tubbs planted 110 acres (45 ha) in grapes and planned on planting another 50 acres (20 ha) at a later date. In 1883 Tubbs helped form the Napa Valley Wine Company along with Charles Krug and others. The first crush at the Hillcrest Estate took place in 1886. The original winery burned to the ground and was replaced by a succession of two stone buildings and later christened Chateau Montelena.

Tubbs was appointed a trustee of Stanford University by Leland Stanford. He was elected to the board of directors of the Southern Pacific Railroad Company in November 1895 and served in that position for a little over a year before handing in his resignation.

== Death ==
Alfred Tubbs died suddenly in his apartment at the Palace Hotel in San Francisco on the morning of December 26, 1896.

== See also ==
- Tubbs Cordage Company Office Building
