= Jordan Vineyard & Winery =

Winery in Sonoma County, California

Coordinates: 38.662056°N 122.850473°W

- Location: Healdsburg, California, USA
- Appellation: Alexander Valley AVA
- Founded: 1972
- First vintage: 1976
- Key people: John Jordan, CEO; Maggie Kruse, winemaker
- Varietals: Cabernet Sauvignon, Chardonnay, Riviere Russe (dessert wine: 1982, 1983, 1985)
- Other products: Extra Virgin Olive Oil
- Distribution: National; exported to 40 countries
- Tasting: By appointment
- Website: jordanwinery.com, The Journey of Jordan video blog

Jordan Vineyard & Winery is an independently owned California winery located in Alexander Valley AVA in Sonoma County. Jordan produces Alexander Valley Cabernet Sauvignon and Russian River Valley Chardonnay.

== History ==
Jordan Vineyard & Winery was founded in 1972 by Tom and Sally Jordan, who first purchased land in 1972 with the dream of planting a vineyard. The Jordan chateau, which overlooks nearly 1,200 acres of hills and vineyards with three quarters of the land dedicated to natural habitat, was designed by the architecture firm Backen, Arrigoni & Ross and was completed in 1976 just before the first vintage of Jordan was harvested.

Jordan's current winemaker is Maggie Kruse. Its winemaker emeritus, Rob Davis, is considered the longest-tenured winemaker in Sonoma County, working at Jordan from 1976 until his retirement in 2019. Davis was hired and mentored by winemaker André Tchelistcheff, who served as consulting enologist for Jordan. Jordan is one of the few wineries that makes only two wines—a Russian River Valley Chardonnay and an Alexander Valley Cabernet Sauvignon. The house style is considered more French than Californian with balance and elegance with lower alcohol and silky tannins.

Today, the winery is owned and operated by Tom and Sally Jordan's son, John. John Jordan's older sister Judy Jordan owned J Vineyards until 2015.

Los Angeles society hostess Betsy Bloomingdale's touted Jordan red and white as her wine of choice for dinner parties in her 1994 book Entertaining with Betsy Bloomingdale.
