= Napa Valley Rail-Road =

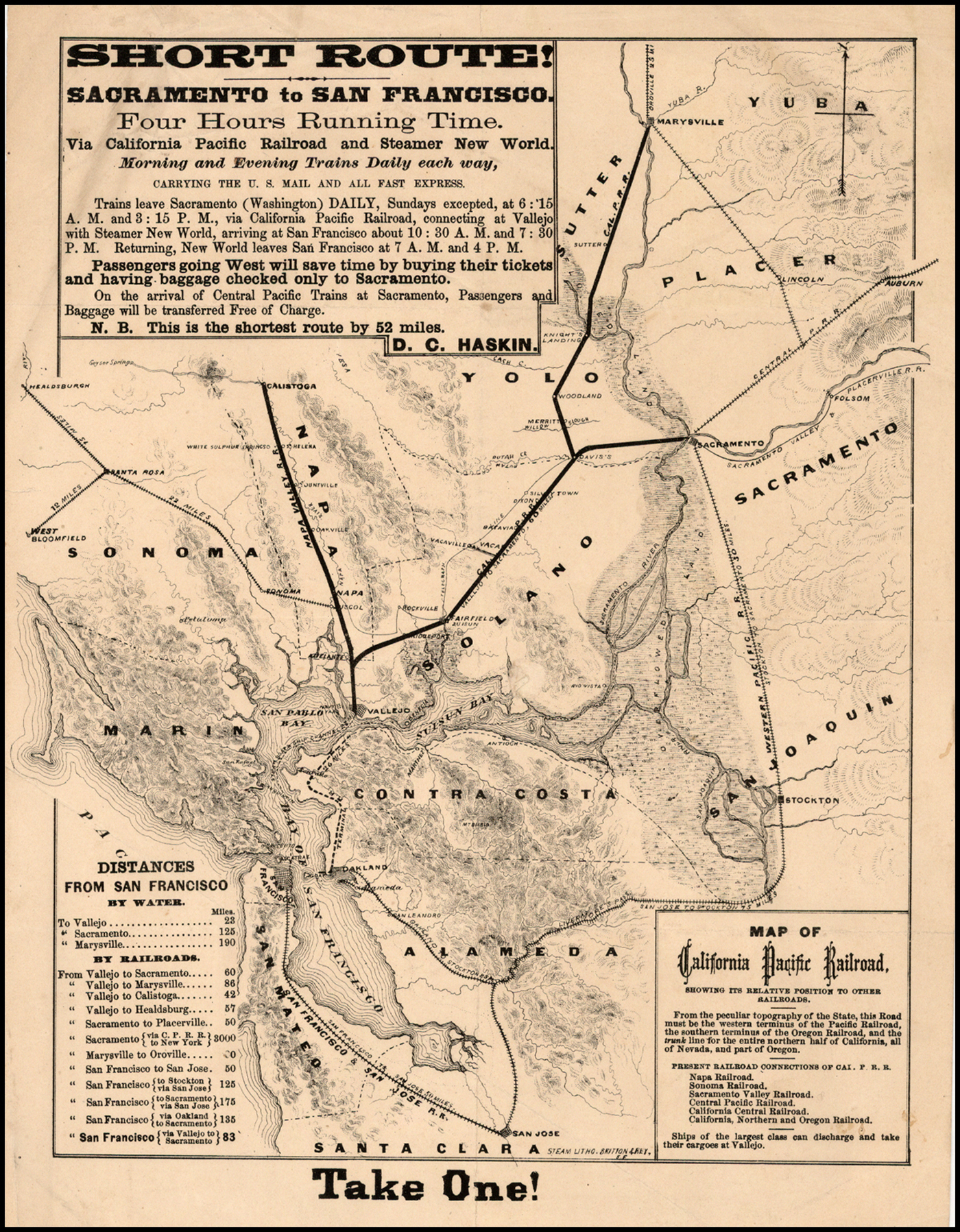

Overview
- Headquarters: Napa, California
- Locale: Adelante - Suscol - Napa - Sebastopol - Oakville - St. Helena - Calistoga
- Dates of operation: 1864–1869
- Successor: California Pacific Railroad

Technical
- Track gauge: 4 ft 8 1/2 in (1,435 mm) standard gauge

The Napa Valley Rail-Road Company was incorporated on March 2, 1864, as the Napa Valley Rail-Road Company, but it would subsequently be spelled as the Napa Valley Railroad Company (without the hyphen) in numerous newspapers and published documents. The company was formed with the goal to construct a railroad through the Napa Valley from the tidewaters at the ferry in Suscol to the Springs in Calistoga. The railroad was completed to Calistoga in 1868 and then extended south from Suscol to Adelante in 1869. The railroad existed for only 5 years before it was sold to the California Pacific Railroad under foreclosure on June 9, 1869.

The Napa Valley Wine Train operates excursion passenger services on the line between Napa and St. Helena.

== History ==
An election was held on May 11, 1864, which resulted in the majority casting "Yes" in favor of a tax of 25 cents for the railroad fund. On November 21, 1864, ground was broken at Suscol for the Napa Valley Rail-Road. The first train ran on the line on July 10, 1865. The railroad faced push back from locals when a proposition for the railroad to extend north from Napa City to Calistoga was planned. In 1866, two elections were held for the public to fund the extension and the measure was defeated twice. That didn't stop the railroad from continuing construction north in April of 1867. The Napa Valley Rail-Road finally reached Calistoga to great fanfare in October 1868.
