= Bottle Shock =

2008 film by Randall Miller

- Theatrical release poster
- Directed by: Randall Miller
- Written by: Randall Miller; Jody Savin; Ross Schwartz
- Produced by: Randall Miller; Jody Savin; Brenda Lhormer; Marc Lhormer; J. Todd Harris; Marc Toberoff
- Starring: Alan Rickman; Bill Pullman; Chris Pine; Rachael Taylor; Freddy Rodriguez; Dennis Farina; Bradley Whitford; Miguel Sandoval; Eliza Dushku
- Cinematography: Michael J. Ozier
- Edited by: Randall Miller; Dan O'Brien
- Music by: Mark Adler
- Distributed by: Freestyle Releasing
- Release date: August 6, 2008
- Running time: 110 minutes
- Country: United States
- Languages: English; French; German
- Budget: $5 million
- Box office: $4.6 million

Bottle Shock is a 2008 American comedy-drama film based on the 1976 wine competition termed the "Judgment of Paris", when California wine defeated French wine in a blind taste test. It stars Alan Rickman, Chris Pine, and Bill Pullman and is directed by Randall Miller, who wrote the screenplay along with Jody Savin and Ross Schwartz. It premiered at the 2008 Sundance Film Festival.

== Plot ==
Sommelier and wine shop owner Steven Spurrier, a British expatriate living in Paris, is concerned with how to save his business in his daily conversation with Maurice, a wine lover from Milwaukee who is Spurrier's regular (sometimes only) customer. He devises a plan to conduct a blind taste test intended to introduce Parisians to the high-quality wines from around the world.

Spurrier travels to the not-yet-famous Napa Valley in search of contestants for his Judgment of Paris taste test, where a chance meeting introduces him to founding vintner Jim Barrett of Chateau Montelena. Barrett wants no part in it, believing it to be a set-up designed by the French to humiliate New World wine producers. Barrett's son, Bo, secretly passes Spurrier a couple of bottles of the Chateau's chardonnay for the competition. Comely and nonconformist university graduate student Sam Fulton arrives at Chateau Montelena in search of an internship. She is promptly put to work while stirring up interest among Bo and the vineyard foreman Gustavo Brambila.

Due to reductive techniques in wine making (the absence or reduction of oxygen during the wine-making process), the Chardonnay has turned brown in the bottles, causing Barrett Sr. to call for the whole vintage to be carted away for dumping. But Bo discovers the brown color is only temporary and races back home. On the way back to Chateau Montelena, however, Bo's truck runs out of gas, forcing him and Sam to find someone to help them out. After several unsuccessful attempts on Bo's part, Sam takes over and gets a driver (who turns out to be a police officer) to pull over by exposing her breasts. Even though she could get arrested for indecent exposure, the officer agrees to help them out. Bo eventually manages to recover the vintage, thanks to the help of local bar owner Joe, who had intercepted the bottles on their way to the dump, intending to recycle them.

Bo is asked to travel to Paris to represent the Napa Valley vintners at the contest. After tallying the scores from the eight Parisian judges, Spurrier is shocked to find that Montelena's Chardonnay has won the competition.

The report is featured in an article of Time; restaurants and wine shops all around America are asked continuously for the wine (Chateau Montelena Chardonnay 1973) and forced to admit that they do not have it. This twist of fate and the resultant oenological epiphany forever change the fortunes of Napa Valley wineries and the global wine industry as a whole, as it is revealed that French wines are, in fact, not unbeatable.

In the end, the characters' futures are revealed: Jim Barrett continues to make wine into his 80s, although Bo now runs the winery. A bottle of Montelena Chardonnay 1973 and the red wine, Stags Leap cabernet sauvignon 1973, also from California, that had won the same competition were given a display case at the Smithsonian Institution. In 2006, thirty years after the first competition, Steven Spurrier hosted another contest, this time with full confidence that French wine would win. California won again.

== Cast ==
- Alan Rickman as Steven Spurrier
- Bill Pullman as Jim Barrett
- Chris Pine as Bo Barrett
- Rachael Taylor as Sam Fulton
- Freddy Rodriguez as Gustavo Brambila
- Eliza Dushku as Joe
- Dennis Farina as Maurice
- Bradley Whitford as Professor Saunders
- Kirk Baily as Loan Officer
- Louis Giambalvo as George Taber
- Miguel Sandoval as Mr. Garcia
- Laurie O'Brien as Laura
- Joe Regalbuto as Bill
- Mary Pat Gleason as Marge
- Mark Famiglietti as Waiter
- Randall Miller as Patron

== Accuracy ==
Steven Spurrier himself has questioned the accuracy of the script while he was involved in another movie project depicting the events of the Judgment of Paris, stating: "There is hardly a word that is true in the script and many pure inventions as far as I am concerned".

While the film depicts Gustavo Brambila as being at Chateau Montelena throughout the events leading up to the Judgment of Paris, his 22-year term at Montelena actually began just after the tasting. While at Chateau Montelena, Brambila worked closely with Mike Grgich – who, although not depicted in the film, was the winemaker behind the 1973 Montelena Chardonnay that won in Paris.

In the film, the prize-winning chardonnay turns brown for 24 hours after bottling. In actuality, the wine turned off-color for a short time after it was bottled, not an uncommon occurrence, and Grgich knew how to handle it.

== Critical response ==
The film received mixed reviews. As of June 2020, the film holds a 48% approval rating on review aggregation website Rotten Tomatoes, based on 124 reviews with an average rating of 5.62 out of 10. The website's critics consensus reads: "Bottle Shock fails to properly utilize the inspiring true tale at its core, settling instead for an ordinary, plodding account."

== Soundtrack ==
1. "China Grove" — The Doobie Brothers
2. "Les Temps Des Cerises" — Scottie Haskell
3. "Rock Steady" — Bad Company
4. "Drivin' Wheel" — Foghat
5. "Un Bel Di Vedremo" — Maria Callas and the Philharmonia Orchestra
6. "Spirit" — The Doobie Brothers
7. "Stand Back" — The Allman Brothers Band
8. "Toulouse Street" — The Doobie Brothers
9. "Jump Into the Fire" — Harry Nilsson
10. "I Need You" — America
11. "Listen to the Music" — The Doobie Brothers
12. "Drinking Wine Spo-De-O-Dee" — Stick McGhee
