= Beaulieu Vineyard =

Winery in Rutherford, California, US

Coordinates: 38.460159°N 122.423444°W

- Location: Napa Valley, U.S.
- Appellation: Rutherford AVA
- Founded: 1900; 126 years ago
- Key people: Trevor Durling, General Manager and Director of Winemaking
- Parent company: Treasury Wine Estates
- Known for: Georges De Latour Private Reserve Cabernet Sauvignon
- Varietals: Cabernet Sauvignon, Pinot noir, Chardonnay, Sangiovese, Zinfandel, Syrah, Viognier, Merlot, Sauvignon blanc
- Distribution: national
- Tasting: open to the public

Beaulieu Vineyard (BV for labelling purposes) is a winery near Rutherford, California, belonging to the appellation Rutherford AVA. It was established by Georges de Latour and his wife Fernande in 1900.

== History ==
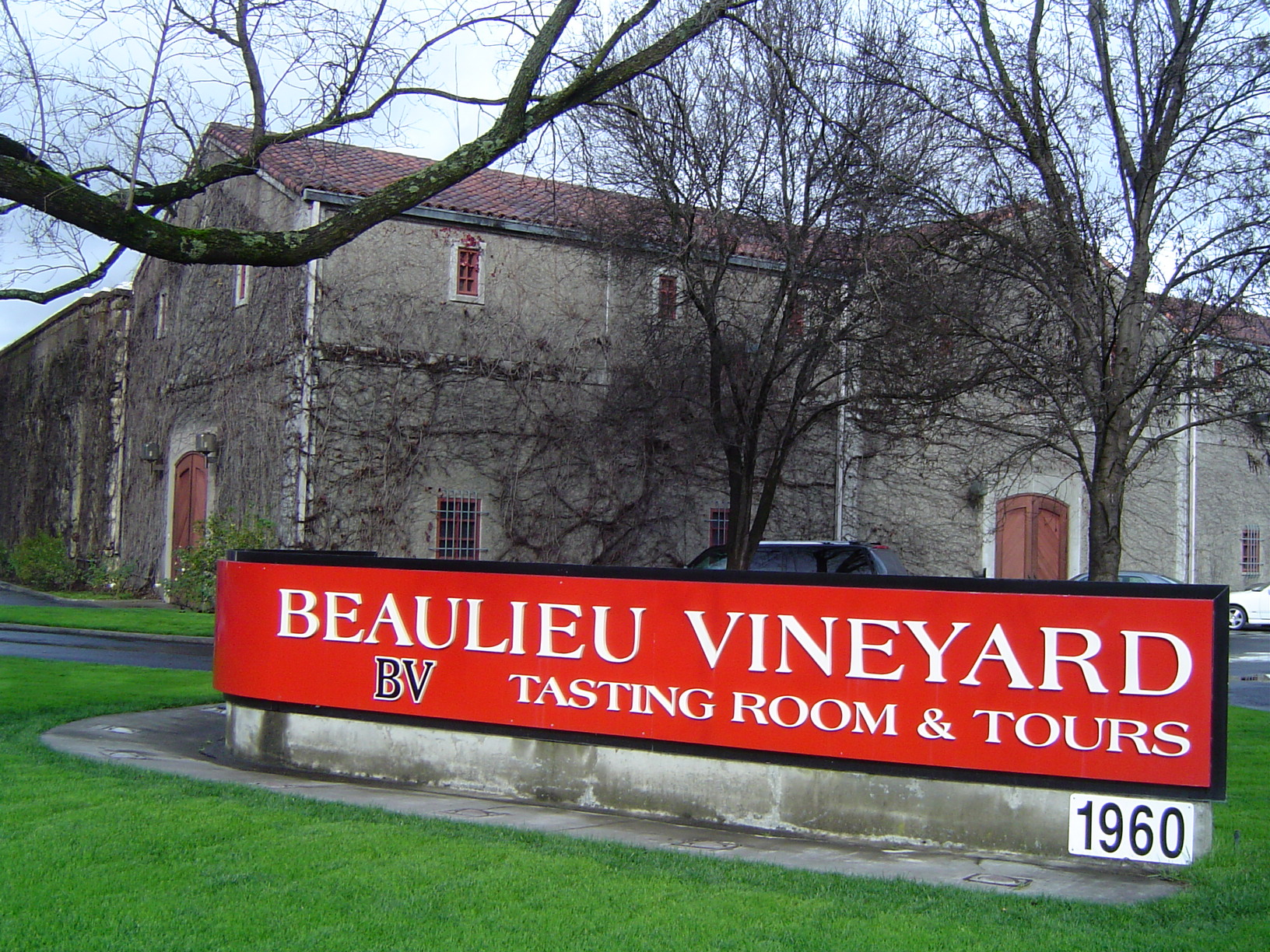
The estate architecture featured in its wine label

Initially a purchase of four acres (1.6 ha) of land in 1900, Beaulieu Vineyard derives its name from the French phrase "Quel beau lieu" which translates to English as "What a beautiful place". Legend has it that Fernande uttered these words when she first saw the land. The following year, they purchased a nearby winery originally built by California State Senator Seneca Ewer in 1885. De Latour's knowledge about phylloxera which had ravaged many Napa Valley vineyard, and his decision to import a rootstock variety resistant to the pest helped secure his stature as one of the early pioneers of California's wine industry.

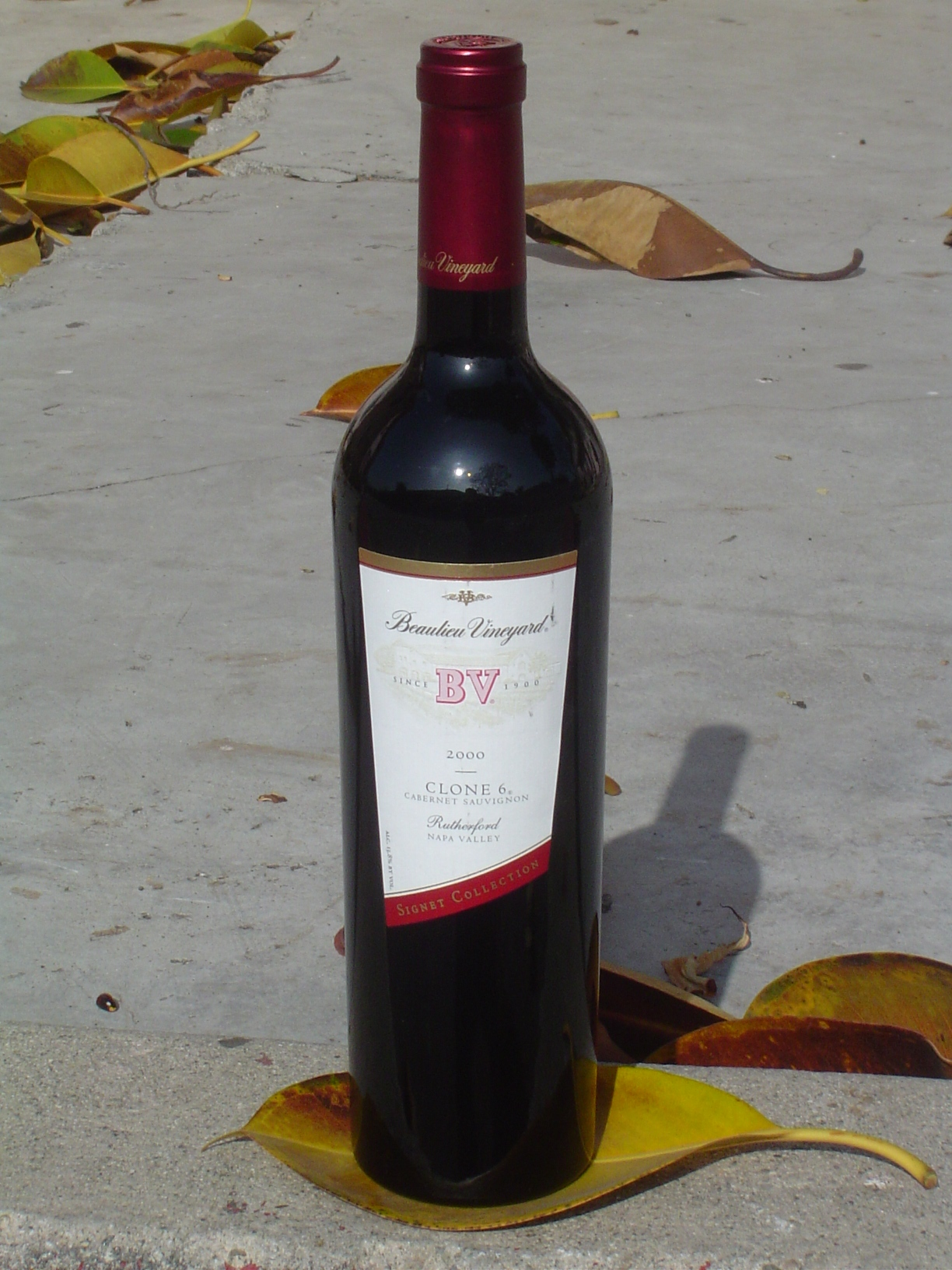
Signet Collection Series Clone 6, 100% Cabernet Sauvignon 2000

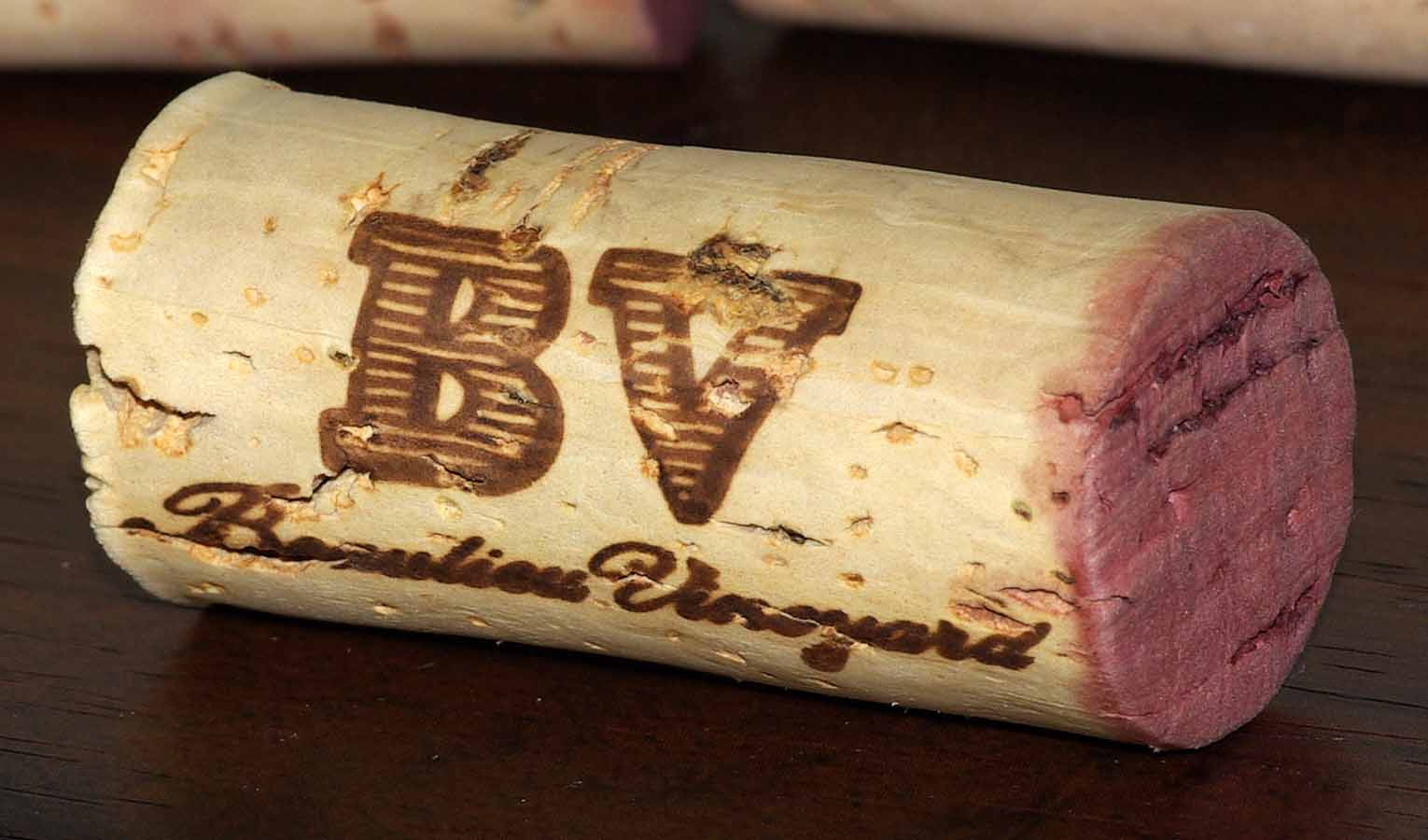
A cork of BV

When Prohibition in the United States began in 1920, most wineries in the country were forced out of operation. However, Beaulieu obtained a contract to supply sacramental wine to churches nationwide. The demand for such wine increased dramatically during the years of Prohibition and the winery repeatedly expanded. By the Repeal of Prohibition in 1933, production had grown to over 1 million US gallons (3,800,000 L) per year.

Following Repeal, Beaulieu hired Andre Tchelistcheff from France as winemaker and the quality of its wines increased significantly. Tchelistcheff provided significant contributions to the techniques of cold fermentation, vineyard frost protection, malolactic fermentation, and the development of winemaking regions in Carneros, California, Oregon and Washington. He also became a mentor to other important winemakers such as Mike Grgich, whose Chateau Montelena Chardonnay won the Judgment of Paris, Joe Heitz of Heitz Wine Cellars, and Robert Mondavi. By the 1940s, Beaulieu wines were served at all major White House functions.

In the mid-1940s, Beaulieu was owned by Marquis de Pins, whose wife was a member of the French wine-making de Latour family. This was noted in Life Magazine in an article on the debut ball at which their daughter was a debutante.

In the 1950s and 1960s Beaulieu was considered one of the "big four" Napa Valley producers, along with Inglenook, also in Rutherford, Charles Krug, and Louis Martini.

In the Ottawa Wine Tasting of 1981, the 1970 vintage of Beaulieu Vineyard George de Latour Private Reserve Cabernet Sauvignon received second place.

The winery was purchased by international conglomerate Heublein Inc., in 1969. Heublein was later acquired by RJR Nabisco, then sold to Grand Metropolitan in 1987. Grand Metropolitan became Diageo in 1997 through a merger with Guinness, and is now the largest multinational beer, wine and spirits company in the world. In 2016 Diageo sold Beaulieu Vineyard to Treasury Wine Estates.
