= Les vins skalli =

Les Vins Skalli
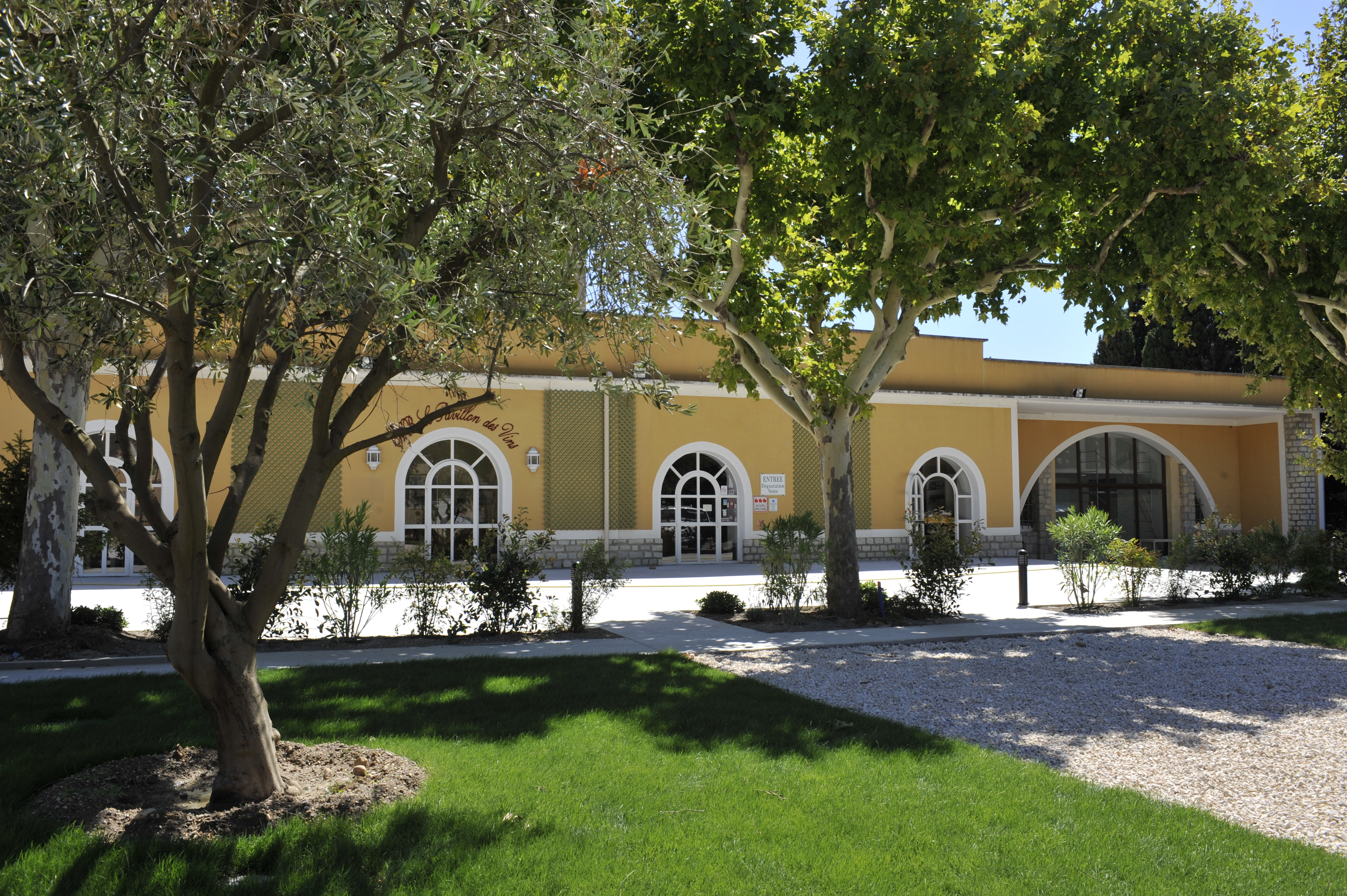
- Headquarters: Châteauneuf-du-pape (Vaucluse), France
- Area served: Worldwide
- Key people: Robert-Elie Skalli (Founder), Robert Skalli (Owner; Chairman), Franck Autard ( CEO)
- Website: http://www.skalli.com

Les Vins Skalli is a French wine company based in Châteauneuf-du-Pape. The company produces French varietal wines, and in the 1980's, the company widened its focus to include wines from the Languedoc region, the Rhone Valley region, Provence, and Napa Valley.

== The 1920s ==
Winemaker Robert-Elie Skalli started his career in the 1920s. He chose to work in the Oran, Mascara and Aïn Témouchent regions of Algeria to plant Southern French variety vines such as Carignan, Cinsault, Grenache, and Alicante. In the 1950s, his son, Francis Skalli, took over the vineyards.

== Mediterranean vineyards ==
In 1961, the Skalli family moved to France from Algeria. Francis Skalli decided to buy Terra Vecchia, land on the Western coast of Corsica. At the same time, he created "Les Établissements Skalli" in Languedoc, which was devoted entirely to the import of Algerian-origin wines and would later become Les Chais du Sud. In 1974, Robert Skalli, the son of Francis Skalli, took on the family business, further developing varietal wines in Languedoc.

== French varietal wines ==
In 1982, the family acquired the Dollarhide Ranch vineyard in the north-west Napa Valley in California. In 1989, they established St. Supéry Vineyards & Winery. Robert Skalli also traveled around Languedoc to convince wine-producers to make varietal wines by planting new grape varieties such as Chardonnay, Sauvignon blanc, Syrah, Merlot and Cabernet Sauvignon.

In 1987, Robert Skalli and Jacques Gravegeal, chairman of southern France’s Vins de Pays d’Oc association, created the official label designation for French variety wines, the Vin de Pays d'Oc. Consequently, that year Robert Skalli launched the first Pays d’Oc - certified varietal wines under the brand name Fortant de France. Fortant has become a touchstone in French culture, even making an appearance on cinema screens in such films as Zabou Breitman's Someone I Loved (Je l’aimais) and more recently, Little White Lies directed by Guillaume Canet.

== Expansion into Mediterranean areas ==
To mark the new millennium, the Skalli family bought the Silène vineyard in the Grès de Montpellier area, and then in 2001, the Maison Bouachon (as well as the "Caves Saint-Pierre" cellars) in Châteauneuf-du-Pape. In 2006, the family went into partnership with Gilardi, thereby establishing the business in Provence. The Terra Vecchia property was sold in 2011.
