= Screaming Eagle Winery and Vineyards =

Californian vineyard

- Location: Oakville, California, U.S.
- Appellation: Oakville AVA
- Founded: 1986
- First vintage: 1992
- Key people: Jean Phillips, founder; Heidi Barrett, former winemaker; Stanley Kroenke; Nick Gislason, winemaker; Robert Black, associate winemaker
- Cases/yr: 600–700
- Varietals: Cabernet Sauvignon, Merlot, Cabernet Franc, Petit Verdot, Sauvignon Blanc
- Distribution: limited
- Website: www.screamingeagle.com

Screaming Eagle Winery and Vineyards is a California wine estate producing limited amounts of varietal wine; due to the small quantities produced and high prices commanded, their wines are considered cult wines. The winery is located in Oakville, California, north of the town of Napa in the Napa Valley.

== History ==
Jean Phillips, a former real estate agent, bought the 57-acre (23 ha) Oakville vineyard in 1986 which was planted with a mix of varieties, most of which Phillips sold to various Napa wineries except 1 acre (0.40 ha), approximately 80 vines, of Cabernet Sauvignon. For this one acre of Cabernet, Philips sought the opinions of Robert Mondavi Winery employees on the commercial potential of her wine before hiring Richard Peterson as a consultant, and subsequently met Peterson's daughter, Heidi Peterson Barrett, who became Screaming Eagle's first winemaker. The entire vineyard was replanted in 1995 to three varieties: Cabernet Sauvignon, Merlot and Cabernet Franc. The 1992 vintage, released in 1995, through a combination of very low production numbers and highly positive reviews (wine critic Robert Parker awarded the wine 99 points) resulted in Screaming Eagle becoming one of the most celebrated and expensive wines in the Napa Valley. Today the estate's flagship wine retails at an average price of $2,983 per bottle.

On March 17, 2006, the estate was sold to billionaire Stan Kroenke and Charles Banks. Phillips disclosed the sale in a letter to Wine Spectator, saying she received an offer she couldn't refuse. In a letter to clients, Phillips stated, "they will renovate old structures or build new ones and replant the vineyard. The new owners have exciting plans to keep it small but raise the bar on quality." Three years later, in April 2009, Charles Banks left Screaming Eagle, leaving Stan Kroenke as the sole proprietor. Armand de Maigret is the estate manager.

In May 2023 Prestige Hong Kong named the 1992 Screaming Eagle Cabernet Sauvignon as one of the world's most expensive wines, with a bottle having sold for US$500,000 at the 2000 Napa Valley Charity Auction. Parker had awarded that specific vintage a "near-perfect" 99 points in 1995. The vintage was considered the most expensive wine in the world until surpassed by the Romanée-Conti bottle.

== Production ==
The vineyard area extends 48.21 acres (19.51 ha), planted with varieties Cabernet Sauvignon, Merlot, Cabernet Franc, and a small amount of Sauvignon blanc. The vineyards are managed by David Abreu Vineyard Management and tended to by vineyard foreman Jorge Delgado and his team. In 2006, 34 acres were replanted. The annual production ranges from 400 to 750 cases (between 5,000 and 9,000 750ml bottles). The winemakers are Nick Gislason, Robert Black and Michel Rolland is a consultant.
