= Naples Winter Wine Festival =

The Naples Winter Wine Festival is a multi-day charity wine festival featuring celebrity chef-hosted dinners and an auction. The event has been held yearly in Naples, Florida since 2001. Since its inception, the Naples Children & Education Foundation, founders of the Naples Winter Wine Festival, has raised more than $336 million for underprivileged and at-risk children in Collier County.

== Past festivals ==
- 2001 - The festival's first year saw $2.7 million ($4.91 million in 2025 dollars) raised for charity. Brady McCrea was the chairman.
- 2002 - $3.4 million ($6.09 million in 2025 dollars) raised for charity, with $2.5 million coming from the auction. Brian Cobb was the chairman.
- 2003 - $3.96 million ($6.93 million in 2025 dollars) was raised. Marcel Wajnert was the chairman.
- 2004 - The festival's auction set a world record for a charity wine auction; $6.67 million ($11.4 million in 2025 dollars). Shirlene Elkins was the chairwoman, and Robert Mondavi was the honored vintner.
- 2005 - The auction set another world record, with $11.1 million ($18.3 million in 2025 dollars).
- 2006 - The auction raised $12.19 million ($19.5 million in 2025 dollars). Grace Evanstad, of Domaine Serene, was the festival's chairwoman.
- 2007 - Theme "Nature's Transformations". A record year - $16.5 million ($25.6 million in 2025 dollars). Chaired by Linda Richards Malone. A single lot went for a record $2 million ($3.11 million in 2025 dollars); a 2008 Rolls-Royce drophead coupe. Naples Winter Wine Festivals' first ever wine tasting took place this year and featured Ann Colgin of Colgin Cellars and Frederic Engerer of Chateau Latour. Ann Colgin was the honored vintner and Daniel Boulud was chef de cuisine.
- 2008 - The auction raised $14 million ($20.9 million in 2025 dollars).
- 2009 - Due to the economy, the auction only raised $5.06 million ($7.59 million in 2025 dollars), the lowest auction total since 2003.
- 2010 - The festival bounced back with $8.06 million in auction lots ($11.9 million in 2025 dollars). Festival Chairs were Kathleen & Francis Rooney.
- 2011 - The auction brought in $11.9 million, but the chairs added another $100,000 to make it an even $12 million ($17.7 million in 2025 dollars)
- 2012 - The auction raised $12.2 million; HRH Prince Robert of Luxembourg was the featured vintner. He donated several vintages of his wine, Château Haut-Brion, which had 2 bidders involved in a bidding war. He donated a second lot to the losing bidder; the combined price for both was $1.1 million.
- 2013 - Theme "When Stars Align," Chairs Terry & Bob Edwards, the auction raised $8.6 million. Chef de Cuisine was Michael Anthony of Gramercy Tavern and Honored Vintner was Barbara Banke of Vérité; top auction lot $750,000 for a 2013 F12berlinetta Ferrari, top wine lot $180,000 for a 65 bottle complete vertical of Château Mouton Rothschild artist label series housed in a custom-made display table. (auction totals reached over $110 million to date)
- 2014 - Theme "Celebrate the Journey," Chairs Anne Welsh McNulty, Linda Richards Malone, Adria Starkey, the auction raised $12.5 million. Chef de Cuisine was Bill Telepan of Telepan and Honored Vintner was Olivier Krug, Krug Champagne; top auction lot $1.4 million for "Beautiful Minds" Fund a Need helping NCEF's Children's Mental Health Initiative; top wine lot was $400,000 "Stunning Staglin" four double magnums of wine from Staglin and Domaine Michel Lafarge and a six-day Parisian and Burgundian wine adventure. Following spirited bidding, a second identical lot was donated. Each captured a bid of $200,000. (auction total reached over $123 million raised to date)
- 2015 – Theme "Imagine the Possibilities" Chairs Sharon & Chuck Hallberg and Sandi & Tom Moran, the auction raised $12.32 million (including $231,000 from online auction). Chef de Cuisine was Barbara Lynch of Menton and Honored Vintner was Marchese Piero Antinori of Marchesi Antinori; top auction lot $1 million for "Now You See It" Fund a Need helping NCEF's Children's Vision Initiative; top wine lot was $500,000 "You've Been Krug'd!" complete with a collection of Krug's most notable bottles and a private, multi-day visit to the champagne house's French estate.
- 2016 – Theme "Great Expectations" Chairs Laura & Jim Dixon and Sandi & Tom Moran; the auction raised $11.2 million (including $171,500 from online auction). Chef de Cuisine was Rick Tramonto of Restaurant R'evolution and Honored Vintner Emily & Paul Michael of Peter Michael Winery; top auction lot was $750,000 for "The Ultimate First Dawn" the first global customer to receive a Rolls-Royce Dawn and visit to Goodwood, UK to watch the car being built; top wine lot was $720,000 for "Rocking at BottleRock" a BottleRock experience for 2 couples with Gargiulo Vineyards.
- 2017 - Theme "Bright Sunshiny Day" Chairs Debbi & Bill Cary, Denise & Brian Cobb, Valerie Boyd & Jeff Gargiulo, Simone & Scott Lutgert, the auction raised over $15.2 million (including $1,646,889 for the NCEF Children's Healthcare Initiative Fund a Need and $183,396 from the online auction.) The Chef de Cuisine was Wolfgang Puck of Wolfgang Puck Worldwide and the Honored Vintner was Pierre Lurton of Chateau Cheval Blanc and Chateau d'Yquem; top auction lot was "A Bright Sunshiny Future" at $1.6 million for the NCEF Children's Healthcare Initiative Fund a Need; top wine lot was $460,000 for "A Journey to Italy" a 6-day voyage to the Amalfi Coast with wines from Lokoya.
- 2018 - Theme "All We Need is Love" Chairs Becky & Lewie Card, Susie & David McCurry, Kathy & Dan Mezzalingua, the auction raised over $15.26 million (including $2.43 million for the NCEF Children's Hunger and Oral Health Initiative Fund a Need). The Chef de Cuisine was Gary Danko of Restaurant Gary Danko and the Honored Vintner was Kary & David Duncan of Silver Oak and Twomey Cellars; top auction lot was "Give, Laugh Love" at $2.43 million for the NCEF Children's Hunger and Oral Health Initiative; top wine lot was $520,00 for "From Veldt to Vineyard" for an insider's trip to South Africa with Shari & Garen Staglin.
- 2019 - Theme "Joy to the World" Chairs Jeannelle & Brian Brady and Linda & Tom Koehn; the auction raised close to $16 million. Chef de Cuisine was Richard Reddington of Redd Wood and Honored Vintners were Daphne & Bart Araujo of Accendo Cellars; top auction lot close to $3 million for "Beautiful Minds," Fund a Need initiative towards Children's Mental Health.
- 2020 - Theme - "Celebrate; 20 Years of Cheers" Festival dates: January 24–26, 2020; Chairs Barbie & Paul Hills, Nancy & Joe Masterson and Shirley & Peter Welsh; the auction raised over $20 million. Chef de Cuisine was Sarah Gruenberg of Monteverde & Pastificio and Honored Vintner was Saskia de Rothschild of Chateau Lafite Rothschild; top auction lot was "Fund the Future" at over $5 million for NCEF's 7 long-term collaborative strategic initiatives.
- 2021 - Theme - "Ain't No Mountain High Enough" Festival dates: January 30, 2021; Chairs The Trustees of the Naples Children & Education Foundation; the virtual auction raised $7.4 million. Top lot was "Your Gift Grants Hope" at more than $5 million for NCEF's annual grant recipients and strategic initiatives.
- 2022 - Theme - "Rise Up: Twenty Twenty Together" Festival dates: January 28–30, 2022; Chairs Valerie Boyd & Jeff Gargiulo, Nena & Bill Beynon, Debbi & Bill Cary, Denise & Brian Cobb, Shirlene Elkins, Libby & Rick Germain, Julie & Rob Heidt, Jr., Barbie & Paul Hills, Scott Lutgert and Shirley & Peter Welsh; Chef de Cuisine was Nancy Oakes of Boulevard in San Francisco, CA; the live auction raised nearly $23 million. Top lot was "Million Meal - It's All for the Kids" and "Raise the Grade" at over $4.5 million for NCEF's Education initiatives - Early Learning, Out-of-School Time and Career and College Readiness.
- 2023 - Theme - "In Perfect Harmony" Festival dates: February 2-5, 2023; Chairs Nena & Bill Beynon, Libby & Rick Germain, and Julia & Rob Heidt, Jr.; Chef de Cuisine was John Tesar of Knife & Spoon in Orlando, FL and Honored Vintner was Philippe Sereys de Rothschild of Château Mouton Rothschild; the live auction raised nearly $26 million; the top auction lot was "Healthy Mind Body & Soul" at over $5 million for NCEF's healthcare initiatives.
- 2024 - Theme - "Generosity in Full Bloom" Festival Dates: January 26-28, 2024; Chairs Shelly & Ralph Stayer; Chef de Cuisine was Paul Bartolotta of The Bartolotta Restaurants in Milwaukee, WI and Honored Vintner was Véronique Boss-Drouhin of Maison Joseph Drouhin of Beaune, France; the live auction raised more than $33 million. The top lots were "Sailing the Turquoise Waters of the Mediterranean" for $2.7 million and more than $7.8 million for "Putting Down Roots: Early Learning GROWS a Healthy Mind" to support NCEF’s early learning and mental health initiatives.
- 2025 - Theme - "25 Years" Festival Dates: January 24-26, 2025; Chairs Nena and Bill Beynon, Debbi and Bill Cary, Denise and Brian Cobb, Shirlene Elkins, Valerie Boyd and Jeff Gargiulo, Libby and Rick Germain, Julia and Rob Heidt, Jr., Barbie and Paul Hills, Simone and Scott Lutgert, and Shelly and Ralph Stayer; Chef de Cuisine was Angelo Auriana of The Factory Kitchen and BRERA Ristorante in Los Angelos, CA and Honored Vintner were Count Louis-Michel and Countess Constance Liger-Belair of Domaine du Comte Liger-Belair in Burgundy, France; the live auction raised over $34 million. The top lots were "Driving at the Speed of Bentley" for $1.7 million and $5.8 million for "Fund the Future" to support all seven of NCEF’s strategic initiatives, including Early Learning, Healthcare, Hunger, Mental Health, Oral Health, Out-of-School Time and Vision.
- 2026 - Theme - "Picture This" Festival Dates: January 30-February 1, 2026; Chairs Nena & Bill Beynon and Ashley & Adam Gerry; Chef de Cuisine was Dustin Valette of The Matheson and Valette in Healdesburg, California and Honored Vintners were Shahpar & Darioush Khaledi of Darioush in Napa, California; the live auction raised over $30 million. The top lots were "Million Dollar Night of Country with Thomas Rhett" for $1.375 million and over $7 million for "The Picture of Health" to support NCF's healthcare initiatives for children.
