= André Tchelistcheff =

American winemaker (1901–1994)

- Born: December 7, 1901; Moscow, Russia
- Died: April 5, 1994 (aged 92); Napa, California, U.S.
- Occupation: Winemaker

André Viktorovich Tchelistcheff (

Russian: Андрей Викторович Челищев, romanized: Andrey Viktorovich Chelishchev; December 7, 1901 – April 5, 1994) was an American winemaker.

Tchelistcheff is most notable for his contributions toward defining the style of California's best wines, especially Cabernet Sauvignon. Called the "dean of American winemakers", industry pioneers, such as Rev. John Staten of Field Stone Winery, Robert Mondavi, Louis Martini, Rob Davis of Jordan Vineyard & Winery, Joel Aiken, Michael Silacci of Opus One, Greg La Follette, of Marchelle Wines, and Rick Sayre of Rodney Strong Wine Estates, considered him their mentor. Andre advised Warren Winiarski in launching Stag's Leap Wine Cellars which famously made the 1973 SLV Cabernet Sauvignon that was awarded the most points in the ”Judgement of Paris” wine tasting in 1976. Andre also assisted Ste. Michelle Wine Estates in launching the Anthology program at Conn Creek Winery in 1991.

== History ==
=== Childhood and education ===
Born to an aristocratic family in Moscow, Russia, on December 7, 1901, Tchelistcheff's father was the chief justice of the Russian imperial court. Tchelistcheff studied at the military academy at Kiev, but returned to his family when they were forced to flee Moscow due to the Russian Revolution of 1917. From 1918 to 1921, Tchelistcheff fought with the White Army in the Russian Civil War. In 1921, he was left for dead on a Crimean battlefield after his unit was machine-gunned during a snowstorm. He eventually recovered and was reunited with his family, who fled Russia to Yugoslavia.

After leaving Russia, Tchelistcheff studied agricultural technology in Czechoslovakia and then continued his education in France at both the Institut Pasteur and the Institut National Agronomique, where he studied oenology, fermentation and microbiology.

=== Winemaker ===
In 1938, Beaulieu Vineyards (BV) founder and owner Georges de Latour visited France in search of a new winemaker who had a cosmopolitan and scientific background. He was introduced to Tchelistcheff at the French National Agronomy Institute where Andre was working, along with research he was doing at the Pasteur Institute. This introduction came through the auspices of Leon Bonnet, Emeritus Professor at University of California, Berkeley and a BV consultant. Although Tchelistcheff had already received offers from winemakers worldwide, he agreed to join Beaulieu Vineyard, and arrived in Napa Valley, California in September 1938 as BV's vice president and chief winemaker.

Tchelistcheff's impact at BV was immediate and profound: he concentrated his efforts on defining a style for high-quality California Cabernet Sauvignon, and created the "Georges de Latour Private Reserve" label. He introduced new techniques and procedures to the region, such as aging wine in small French Oak barrels. By the mid-1940s, "Private Reserve" was widely recognized as the benchmark for California Cabernet Sauvignon, and was served at all important White House functions. The shift to using small American oak barrels took place after the US entered WWII, and became an accepted tradition at BV under Tchelistcheff and his successors until 1989.

Tchelistcheff provided significant contributions to the techniques of cold fermentation, vineyard frost protection, malolactic fermentation, and the development of winemaking regions in Carneros, California, Oregon and Washington.

He remained vice president of Beaulieu Vineyards until his retirement in 1973. He later became consulting enologist at Jordan Vineyard & Winery beginning with its inaugural 1976 vintage. He also operated a private wine laboratory in St. Helena and consulted to Joseph Heitz, Rev. John Staten of Field Stone Winery, Mike Grgich, Joel Aiken, Jordan, Neibaum/Coppola, Buena Vista Winery, George & Peter Rubissow, Erath Winery, Sequoia Grove, Chateau Ste. Michelle, and Columbia Crest Winery. While consulting for Chateau Ste. Michelle in Washington, Tchelistcheff advised Mike McGrath in 1991 from Conn Creek Winery with the Anthology "Bordeaux Blend" program. He also gave winemaking advice to his nephew, Alex Golitzin who went on to found Quilceda Creek Winery in Snohomish, Washington with a singular focus on Cabernet Sauvignon. Quilceda Creek continues to be an internationally recognized Cabernet Sauvignon producer and has been awarded over twenty 100-point scores from critics including The Wine Advocate, Decanter (magazine), International Wine Report and acclaimed Washington wine blogger Owen Bargreen.

A man of diminutive stature (4'11"), his quick wit, sharp intellect, and legendarily refined palate endeared him to three generations of California winemakers, who affectionately referred to him as the "Maestro." Tchelistcheff was inducted into the Culinary Institute of America's Vintner's Hall of Fame in 2007.

A grand-nephew of André, Mark Tchelistcheff, has completed a feature-length film about André: André Tchelistcheff: The voice of wine.

== Awards ==
- Wine Spectator Distinguished Service Award, 1986.
- Wine Man of the Year, Wine Industry Technical Symposium, 1990
- Reader's Choice Award, The Person Who Has Done the Most to Advance Wine Quality, Wine Spectator 2000
- COPIA Lifetime Achievement Award, 2004.
- Vintners Hall of Fame (Created by the Culinary Institute of America), March 2007

== See also ==
- List of wine personalities
