= Mike Grgich =

Croatian-American winemaker (1923–2023)

- Grgich, c. 1984
- Born: Miljenko Grgic; April 1, 1923; Desne, Kingdom of Yugoslavia (modern Croatia)
- Died: December 13, 2023 (aged 100); Calistoga, California, U.S.
- Education: University of Zagreb
- Occupation: Winemaker
- Spouse: Tatjana Grgich
- Children: 1

Miljenko "Mike" Grgich (Croatian pronunciation: [mǐʎeːŋko gřːgit͡ɕ] or Croatian pronunciation: [gr̂git͡ɕ] GUR-gich) was a Croatian-American winemaker in California. He was the winemaker behind the 1973 Chateau Montelena Chardonnay that bested several white Burgundy wines in the wine tasting event that became known as the Judgment of Paris. In recognition of his contributions to the American wine industry, Grgich was inducted into the Culinary Institute of America's Vintner's Hall of Fame on March 7, 2008. The tribute came at the same time that Grgich was celebrating his 50th vintage of winemaking in the Napa Valley.

== Life ==
Miljenko Grgich was born into a winemaking family in the village of Desne in the town of Metkovic on Croatia's coastal region of Dalmatia. He attended the University of Zagreb Faculty of Agriculture, where he studied viticulture and enology. However, he learned about California and wanted to leave the then-Yugoslavia to become a winemaker there. In 1954, he left communist Yugoslavia for West Germany, obtaining a fellowship to study there. From there he emigrated to Canada, and finally to the U.S. after receiving a job offer from a winery in California.

After working at several wineries in the Napa Valley – including Souverain Winery, Christian Brothers Cellars, Beaulieu Vineyard (working alongside André Tchelistcheff), and Robert Mondavi – Grgich became the winemaker and limited partner at Chateau Montelena. His 1973 vintage Chardonnay was selected to compete in the Paris Wine Tasting of 1976, where it was ranked the number one white wine. A dramatized version of the story is told in the 2008 film Bottle Shock which did not depict Grgich, who did not want to be involved with the film's inaccuracies.

This success permitted Grgich (with business partner Austin Hills of Hills Brothers Coffee family), to establish his own winery, Grgich Hills Cellar in Rutherford, California. The winery, which changed names to Grgich Hills Estate in 2006, owns 366 acres (148 ha) of vineyards and produces 70,000 cases of wine each year. Its very first vintage won the Great Chardonnay Showdown, with 221 competitors from countries around the world.

Grgich turned 100 on April 1, 2023, and died in Calistoga, California, on December 13. His signature dark blue beret, which reflects Grgich’s European roots, is in the National Museum of American History.

== See also ==
- List of wine personalities
