= Rutherford, California =

Census-designated place in California, United States

Rutherford
- census-designated place
- Location within the state of California Rutherford (the United States)
- Coordinates: 38°27′31″N 122°25′17″W
- Country: United States
- State: California
- County: Napa

Area
  - Total: 1.684 sq mi (4.361 km^{2})
  - Land: 1.680 sq mi (4.350 km^{2})
  - Water: 0.0039 sq mi (0.010 km^{2}) 0.24%

Population (2020)
  - Total: 115
  - Density: 68.5/sq mi (26.4/km^{2})
- Time zone: UTC-8 (Pacific (PST))
  - Summer (DST): UTC-7 (PDT)
- ZIP code: 94573
- Area code: 707
- GNIS feature ID: 2583124

Rutherford is a census-designated place (CDP) in Napa County, California, United States. The population was 115 at the 2020 census.

Rutherford is located in the Rutherford AVA (American Viticultural Area) which is located in the larger Napa Valley AVA. The Robert Mondavi Winery is located between Rutherford and neighboring Oakville (though its corporate headquarters are in nearby St. Helena). Other notable wineries in the Rutherford area include Beaulieu Vineyard, Grgich Hills Estate, St. Supéry Estate Vineyards & Winery, and Inglenook. The Auberge du Soleil restaurant and resort is located in Rutherford.

Rutherford's zip code is 94573. It is inside area code 707.

== History ==
Rutherford is located within the 11,887-acre (4,810 ha) Mexican land grant Rancho Caymus deeded to the early Napa Valley settler George C. Yount from General Mariano Guadalupe Vallejo in 1838 as payment for a variety of services. Yount gave a 1,040-acre (421 ha) portion of the grant to his granddaughter Elizabeth and her husband Thomas Rutherford in 1864 as a wedding present. The Rutherfords planted vineyards and made wine in the late 1800s.

In August 2020, the Hennessey Fire was started by a lightning strike in the Vaca Mountains in the Rutherford area, resulting in widespread evacuations and the burning of over 315,611 acres (127,723 ha).

== Geography ==
According to the United States Census Bureau, the CDP covers an area of 1.7 square miles (4.4 km^{2}), of which 99.76% is land and 0.24% is water.

== Demographics ==
Historical population
Census	Pop.	Note	%±
2010	164		—
2020	115		−29.9%
U.S. Decennial Census; 2010

Rutherford first appeared as a census designated place in the 2010 U.S. census.

The 2020 United States census reported that Rutherford had a population of 115. The population density was 68.5 inhabitants per square mile (26.4/km^{2}). The racial makeup of Rutherford was 57 (49.6%) White, 0 (0.0%) African American, 0 (0.0%) Native American, 3 (2.6%) Asian, 0 (0.0%) Pacific Islander, 28 (24.3%) from other races, and 27 (23.5%) from two or more races. Hispanic or Latino of any race were 57 persons (49.6%).

The whole population lived in households. There were 56 households, out of which 7 (12.5%) had children under the age of 18 living in them, 16 (28.6%) were married-couple households, 9 (16.1%) were cohabiting couple households, 23 (41.1%) had a female householder with no partner present, and 8 (14.3%) had a male householder with no partner present. 20 households (35.7%) were one person, and 13 (23.2%) were one person aged 65 or older. The average household size was 2.05. There were 24 families (42.9% of all households).

The age distribution was 14 people (12.2%) under the age of 18, 7 people (6.1%) aged 18 to 24, 28 people (24.3%) aged 25 to 44, 34 people (29.6%) aged 45 to 64, and 32 people (27.8%) who were 65 years of age or older. The median age was 52.5 years. There were 58 males and 57 females.

There were 82 housing units at an average density of 48.8 units per square mile (18.8 units/km^{2}), of which 56 (68.3%) were occupied. Of these, 28 (50.0%) were owner-occupied, and 28 (50.0%) were occupied by renters.

== Government ==
In the California State Legislature, Rutherford is in the 3rd senatorial district, represented by Democrat Christopher Cabaldon, and in the 4th Assembly district, represented by Democrat Cecilia Aguiar-Curry. In the United States House of Representatives, Rutherford is in California's 4th congressional district, represented by Democrat Mike Thompson.
