= Chateau Montelena =

Winery in Napa Valley, California, US

Coordinates: 38.6025182°N 122.59991°W

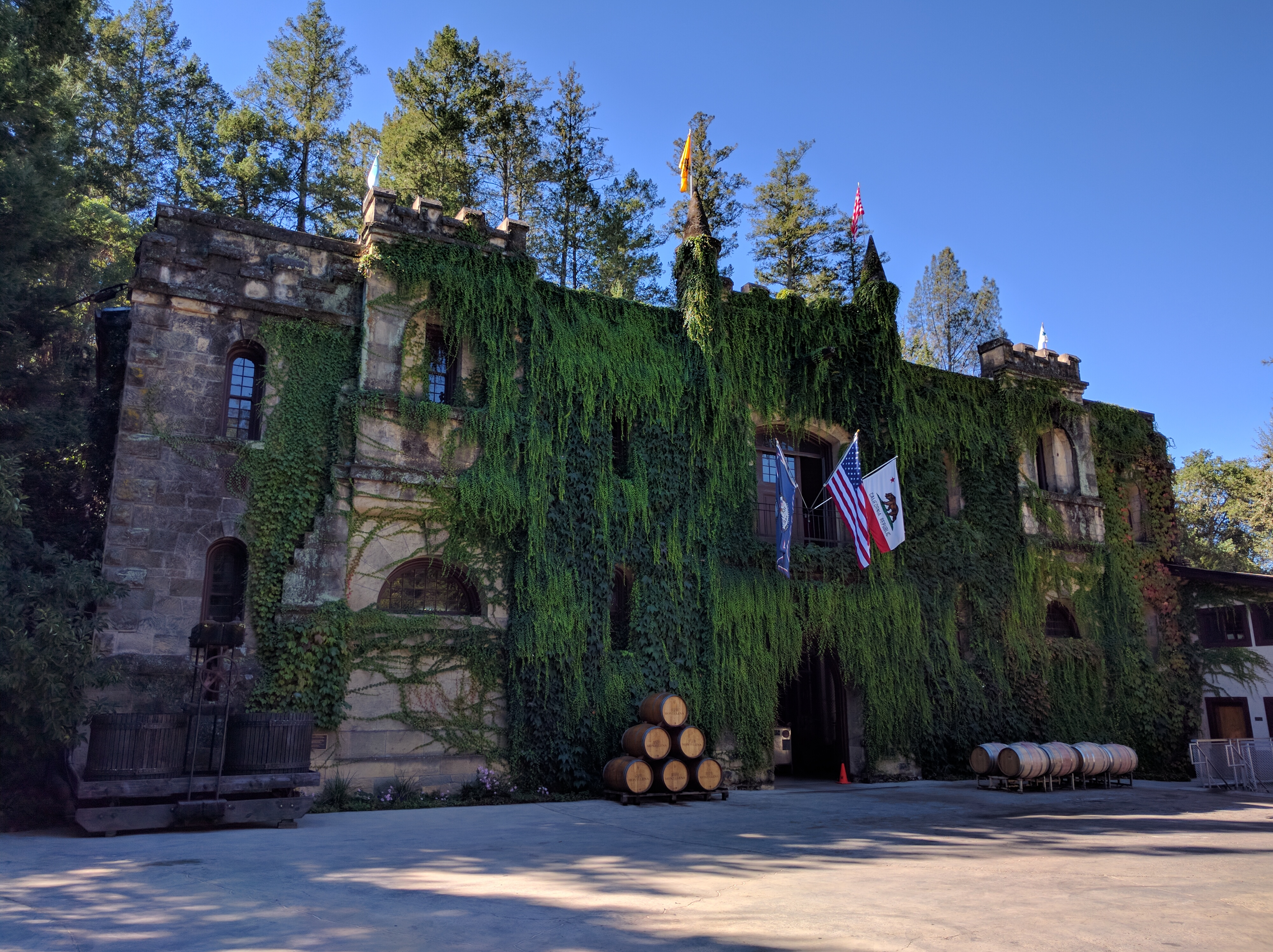
- Location: Calistoga, California, United States
- Appellation: Calistoga AVA; Napa Valley AVA
- Other labels: Potter Valley
- Founded: 1882
- Key people: Bo Barrett, CEO; Miljenko "Mike" Grgich, Winemaker; Matt Crafton, Winemaker; Jock Busser, National Sales Manager; Cameron Wolfe, Vineyard Manager
- Cases/yr: 30,000–36,000
- Varietals: Chardonnay, Zinfandel, Cabernet Sauvignon, Riesling
- Distribution: national
- Tasting: open to the public
- Website: www.montelena.com
- Alfred L. Tubbs Winery
- U.S. National Register of Historic Places
- NRHP reference No.: 12001235
- Added to NRHP: January 30, 2013

Chateau Montelena is a Napa Valley winery most famous for winning the white wine section of the historic "Judgment of Paris" wine competition. Chateau Montelena's Chardonnay was in competition with nine other wines from France and California under blind tasting. All 11 judges awarded their top scores to either the Chardonnays from Chateau Montelena or Chalone Winery, another California wine producer. A fictionalized version of Chateau Montelena's historic victory was featured in the 2008 film Bottle Shock.

== History ==
=== Tubbs ===
In 1882, entrepreneur Alfred L. Tubbs bought 254 acres (103 ha) of land just north of Calistoga at the foot of Mount Saint Helena. Tubbs had made a fortune from the rope business during the Gold Rush, and knew the area from visits to the White Sulphur Springs Resort nearby. He planted vines, and by 1896 Chateau Montelena was the seventh largest winery in the Napa Valley.

With the onset of Prohibition in the United States, winemaking ceased at the Chateau and in the period that followed Tubbs sold grapes but did not make wine. In 1958 the Tubbs family sold the Chateau to Yort Wing Frank, a Chinese electrical engineer, and his wife Jeanie, who were looking for a retirement home. The Franks created a garden in the style of their homeland, and excavated Jade Lake. The Chinese garden is a popular spot for picnics, although access is now limited to members of the Chateau wine club.

=== Paschich ===
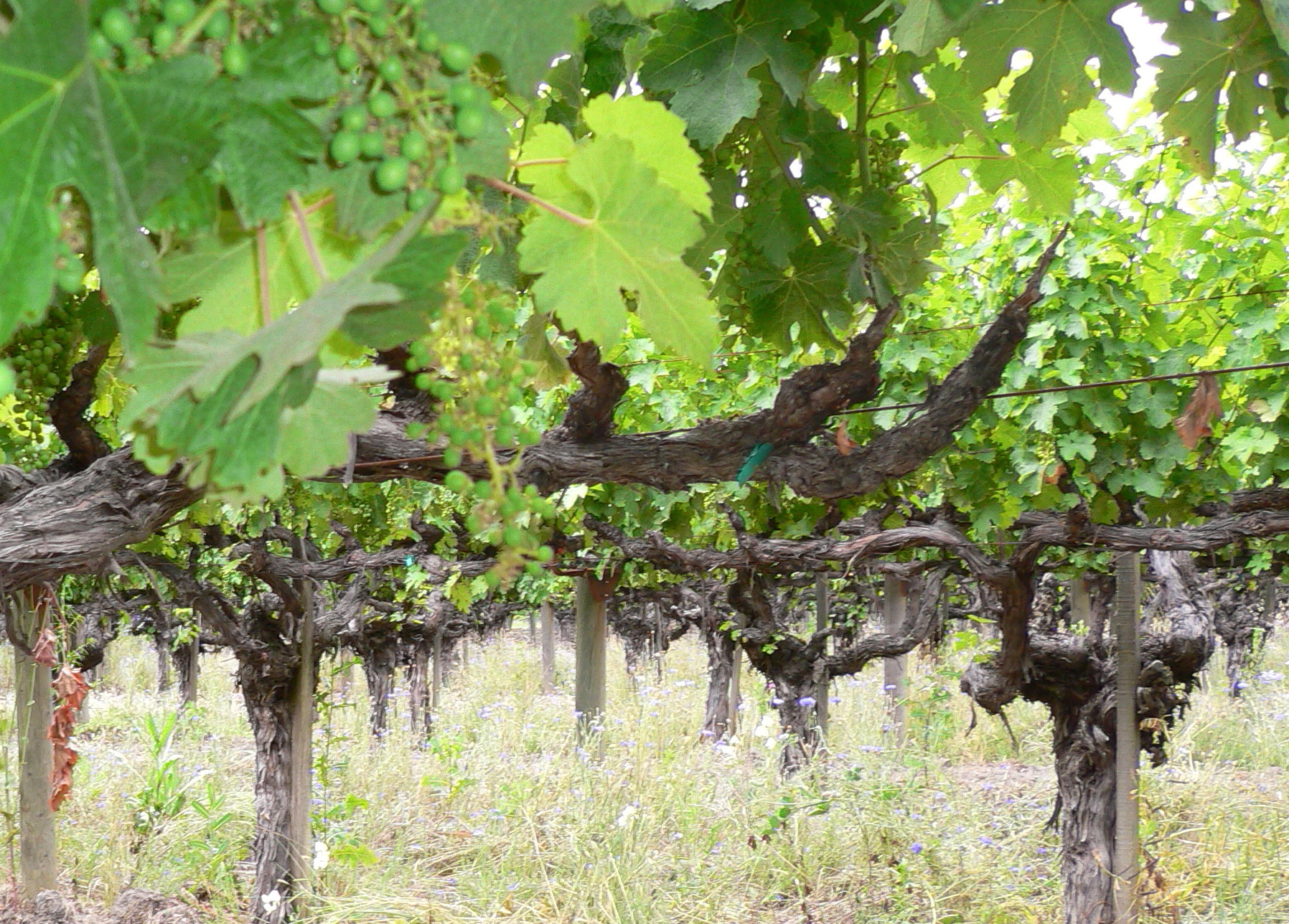
Cabernet Sauvignon vines at Chateau Montelena

In 1968, Lee and Helen Paschich bought the property, and brought in as partners lawyer James L. Barrett and property developer Ernest Hahn. Barrett replanted the vineyard and installed winemaking equipment in the historic buildings and it began producing wines again in 1972, with Mike Grgich employed as winemaker and who also orchestrated the winery’s entire design. Four years later, the Chateau Montelena 1973 Chardonnay won first place among the chardonnays and white Burgundies entered in the "Judgment of Paris" wine competition. A bottle of that vintage is in the Smithsonian National Museum of American History.

In 2004 Chateau Montelena was subject to claims by James Laube of Wine Spectator that its wines were tainted by TCA. Following an independent laboratory test confirmation, Jim Barrett announced the measures taken to eliminate the presence of 2,4,6-trichloroanisole in the Montelena winery.

=== San Francisco Tasting Room ===
Since late 2011, Chateau Montelena has set up a satellite tasting room within The Westin St. Francis, in Union Square, San Francisco.

=== Terminated sale ===
In July 2008 it was announced that Michel Reybier, owner of Bordeaux winery Cos d'Estournel, had purchased Chateau Montelena from Jim and Bo Barrett for an undisclosed sum, a transaction which at the time of announcement Robert Parker described as "one of the biggest stories in my 30 years in the wine field". An executive committee, made up of Bo Barrett, managing director Greg Ralston, and the winemaker at Cos d'Estournel Dominique Arangoits, with Jean-Guillaume Prats, general manager at Cos d'Estournel as president were set to oversee the 2008 vintage, with a future strategy to expand the brand and replant 75% of the vineyards. By November 2008, however, the agreement was cancelled. The termination of the transaction by Chateau Montelena was stated to be due to the fact that Reybier Investments had been "unable to meet its obligations".

== See also ==
- California wine
