= Vichy Springs, Napa County, California =

Unincorporated community in California, United States

Vichy Springs
- Unincorporated community
- Location within the state of California Vichy Springs (the United States)
- Coordinates: 38°20′16″N 122°15′36″W
- Country: United States
- State: California
- County: Napa
- Elevation: 75 ft (23 m)
- Time zone: UTC-8 (Pacific (PST))
  - Summer (DST): UTC-7 (PDT)
- ZIP codes: 94558
- Area code: 707
- GNIS feature ID: 1660098

Vichy Springs, more fully Napa Vichy Springs, is a set of springs in Napa County, California, United States whose water was once bottled and sold in 1898 as Napa Vichy Water. Vichy Springs is situated south of the Silverado Country Club and Milliken Creek on Montecello Road a few miles northeast of Napa.

Vichy Springs and most of the surrounding lands had once been part of the Mexican land grant Rancho Yajome. Most of this watershed was wilderness area to at least 1869, and thereafter this portion of the Milliken Creek watershed, which historically has had a robust steelhead run, was developed for pastoral and grazing agricultural uses.

The ZIP Code is 94558. The community is served by area code 707.

== Other uses of the name ==
There is a carbonated hot springs named Vichy Springs east of Ukiah.
