= Vichy Springs, California =

Vichy Springs, California may refer to several places:

- Vichy Springs, Mendocino County, California
- Vichy Springs, Napa County, California
