= Moskowite Corner, California =

Moskowite Corner
- census-designated place
- Position in California.
- Coordinates: 38°26′38″N 122°11′31″W
- Country: United States
- State: California
- County: Napa

Area
  - Total: 2.838 sq mi (7.351 km^{2})
  - Land: 2.834 sq mi (7.339 km^{2})
  - Water: 0.0046 sq mi (0.012 km^{2}) 0.16%
- Elevation: 833 ft (254 m)

Population (2020)
  - Total: 237
  - Density: 83.6/sq mi (32.3/km^{2})
- Time zone: UTC-8 (Pacific (PST))
  - Summer (DST): UTC-7 (PDT)
- Area code: 707
- GNIS feature ID: 2583087

Moskowite Corner is a census-designated place in Napa County, California, United States. Moskowite Corner sits at an elevation of 833 feet (254 m). The 2020 United States census reported Moskowite Corner's population as 237.

== Geography ==
According to the United States Census Bureau, the CDP covers an area of 2.8 square miles (7.3 km^{2}), of which 99.84% is land and 0.16% is water.

== Demographics ==
Historical population
Census	Pop.	Note	%±
2010	210		—
2020	237		12.9%
U.S. Decennial Census; 2010

Moskowite Corner first appeared as a census designated place in the 2010 U.S. census.

The 2020 United States census reported that Moskowite Corner had a population of 237. The population density was 83.6 inhabitants per square mile (32.3/km^{2}). The racial makeup of Moskowite Corner was 122 (51.5%) White, 2 (0.8%) African American, 7 (3.0%) Native American, 5 (2.1%) Asian, 0 (0.0%) Pacific Islander, 60 (25.3%) from other races, and 41 (17.3%) from two or more races. Hispanic or Latino of any race were 102 persons (43.0%).

The whole population lived in households. There were 90 households, out of which 41 (45.6%) had children under the age of 18 living in them, 50 (55.6%) were married-couple households, 11 (12.2%) were cohabiting couple households, 19 (21.1%) had a female householder with no partner present, and 10 (11.1%) had a male householder with no partner present. 20 households (22.2%) were one person, and 17 (18.9%) were one person aged 65 or older. The average household size was 2.63. There were 60 families (66.7% of all households).

The age distribution was 47 people (19.8%) under the age of 18, 12 people (5.1%) aged 18 to 24, 76 people (32.1%) aged 25 to 44, 76 people (32.1%) aged 45 to 64, and 26 people (11.0%) who were 65 years of age or older. The median age was 39.3 years. For every 100 females, there were 91.1 males.

There were 90 housing units at an average density of 31.8 units per square mile (12.3 units/km^{2}), which were all occupied, 64 (71.1%) by homeowners, and 26 (28.9%) by renters.
