= Silverado Resort and Spa =

Golf, tennis, and spa resort in Napa County, California, United States

Silverado Resort
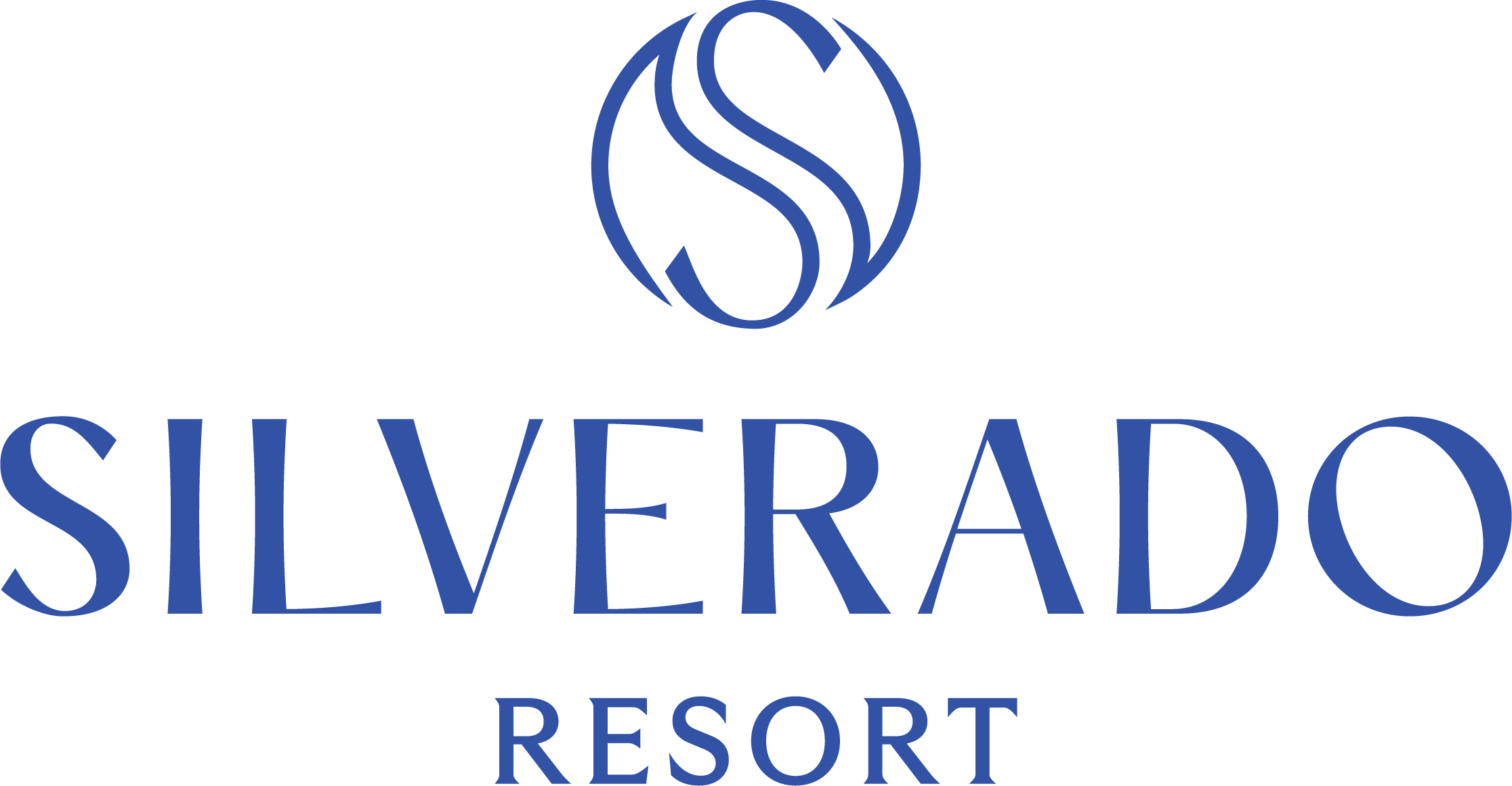
- Interactive map of Silverado Resort

Club information
- Tournaments: Safeway Open
- Website: silveradoresort.com

North Course
- Designed by: Robert Trent Jones Jr. (1966 redesign); Johnny Miller (2011 redesign)
- Par: 72
- Length: 7,166 yards (6,553 m)
- Course rating: 74.3
- Slope rating: 135

South Course
- Par: 72
- Length: 6,612 yards (6,046 m)
- Course rating: 72.5
- Slope rating: 133

The Silverado Resort is a 1,200-acre (4.9 km^{2}) golf, tennis, and spa resort in Napa County, California, United States. The venue is named after the Silverado Mine, a quicksilver mine near Mount Saint Helena. The resort is the fifth largest employer in Napa County.

The United States Census Bureau has designated the area surrounding the Silverado Resort as a separate census-designated place (CDP) for statistical purposes. The population of the CDP was 948 at the 2020 census.

In October 2017, parts of the resort were damaged by wildfires; flames arrived hours after the conclusion of the Safeway Open.

== The Country Club ==
The resort's centerpiece Southern-style mansion was built by General John Franklin Miller in the 1860s. Amfac, Inc. developed the property as a resort in the 1960s and it was purchased by Robert Meyer in 1984 for $20 million. He sold it to Isao Okawa in 1989 for $110 million, and after his death it was inherited by his son, Setsuo Okawa; the property was listed for sale by the Okawa family in September 2009. In 2010, professional golfer and businessman Johnny Miller, Rug Doctor Corporation founder Roger Kent, and its CEO Tim Wall assumed ownership of the resort under a partnership agreement named Silverado Resort Investment Group LLC on July 1. Dolce Hotels and Resorts Company was hired by the partnership to manage the resort. Miller made several changes to freshen up the two championship courses including lengthening the North Course by 250 yards (230 m), widening fairways, repositioning bunkers, and rebuilding tees. He also lengthened the club's driving range and added a teaching area to the range. The resort was sold to KSL Capital Partners, LLC and Arcade Capital LLC in 2022.

In addition to two golf courses, the resort hosts a spa, outdoor pool, tennis & pickleball courts, fitness center, bocce courts.

=== Golf ===
The original 18-hole golf course at Silverado opened 71 years ago in 1955, and is now the North Course. In 1966, it was re-designed by Robert Trent Jones, Jr. and the South Course was added. The resort also has 16 tennis courts, 10 swimming pools, 280 guest condo hotel units and private cottage suites. There are 300 privately owned condominiums on the grounds of the resort.

The resort has played host to several PGA Tour events. The north course hosted the Kaiser International Open Invitational from 1968 through 1976 and the Anheuser-Busch Golf Classic from 1977 through 1980. Champions Tour events from 1989 to 2002 were held on the south course at Silverado under the titles of Transamerica, Transamerica Senior Golf Championship, and Napa Valley Championship. The PGA Tour returned to the north course in October 2014 with the Frys.com Open, later the Safeway Open, then the Fortinet Championship, and currently the Procore Championship. The resort has received the annual Distinguished Golf Destination Award, given out by the Boardroom Magazine.

==== Scorecards ====
Silverado Resort and Spa - North Course
Tee	Rating/Slope	1	2	3	4	5	6	7	8	9	Out	10	11	12	13	14	15	16	17	18	In	Total
Tournament	74.3 / 135	436	240	424	407	538	417	212	360	557	3591	422	182	391	458	412	189	571	375	575	3575	7166
SI	Tournament	1	17	7	5	9	3	15	13	11		4	18	16	2	12	10	6	14	8
Blue	72.6 / 133	432	193	399	378	536	431	209	344	521	3443	409	174	363	413	389	187	521	355	539	3350	6793
White	70.2 / 128	402	148	345	370	521	404	182	308	491	3171	375	130	353	392	367	163	501	332	518	3131	6302
Gold	68.3 / 124	381	137	331	309	487	393	155	293	474	2960	358	115	313	340	347	139	485	308	503	2908	5868
SI	Men's	7	17	5	1	9	3	15	13	11		4	18	16	2	12	10	6	14	8
Par		4	3	4	4	5	4	3	4	5	36	4	3	4	4	4	3	5	4	5	36	72
Gold	73.5 / 129	381	137	331	309	487	393	155	293	474	2960	358	115	313	340	347	139	485	308	503	2908	5868
Combo	71.5 / 124	327	137	294	309	487	313	155	293	474	2789	329	113	313	340	297	139	485	308	417	2741	5530
Burgundy	69.8 / 120	327	129	294	300	430	313	146	283	369	2591	329	113	261	333	297	132	418	296	417	2596	5187
SI	Women's	9	15	5	11	1	7	17	13	3		4	18	14	8	12	16	6	10	2

Silverado Resort and Spa - South Course
Tee	Rating/Slope	1	2	3	4	5	6	7	8	9	Out	10	11	12	13	14	15	16	17	18	In	Total
Blue	72.5 / 133	371	416	183	368	355	380	211	426	482	3192	366	565	415	492	383	174	331	194	500	3420	6612
White	70.6 / 127	361	397	150	352	330	359	179	404	462	2994	347	544	390	462	367	147	315	159	482	3213	6207
Gold	67.3 / 123	352	377	119	340	324	287	146	363	435	2743	329	508	311	453	324	125	283	114	470	2917	5660
SI	Men's	9	5	15	11	7	3	17	1	13		10	4	2	8	6	18	16	14	12
Par		4	4	3	4	4	4	3	4	5	35	4	5	4	5	4	3	4	3	5	37	72
Gold	72.7 / 131	352	377	119	340	324	287	146	363	435	2743	329	508	311	453	324	125	283	114	470	2917	5660
Burgundy	70.5 / 125	297	357	112	331	314	278	139	358	430	2616	270	502	299	448	318	82	272	109	460	2760	5376
SI	Women's	6	8	16	14	10	12	18	2	4		9	1	13	3	7	15	11	17	5

== Natural features ==
Silverado Country Club in 1948

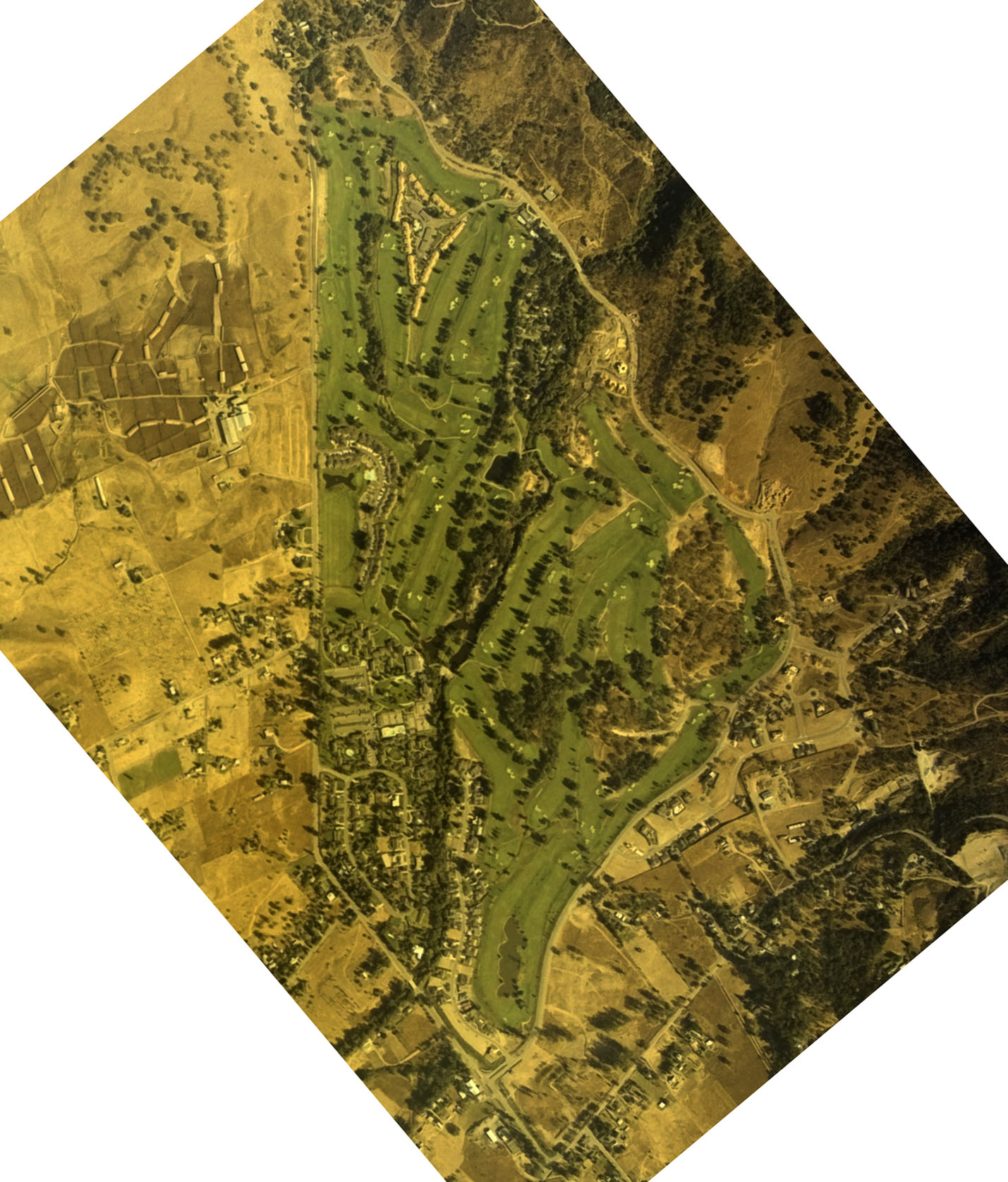
Silverado Country Club 1973

Milliken Creek, a tributary to the Napa River, flows through the Silverado Country Club. There are approximately 7,300 acres (30 km^{2}) planted to vineyards in this watershed including the drainage area of Milliken Reservoir. Milliken Creek rises on the western slopes of the east side of the Napa Valley before flowing through the Silverado Country Club property. Much of this area had once been part of the Mexican land grant Rancho Yajome. Most of this watershed was wilderness area to at least 1869, and thereafter the lower watershed was begun to be developed as pasture and grazing agricultural uses. In a 1989 stream survey conducted for the Silverado country Club by Earth Metrics Inc, the steelhead fishery was found to be robust up to and including the Silverado Country Club.

== See also ==
- Atlas Peak
