= Milliken Creek (California) =

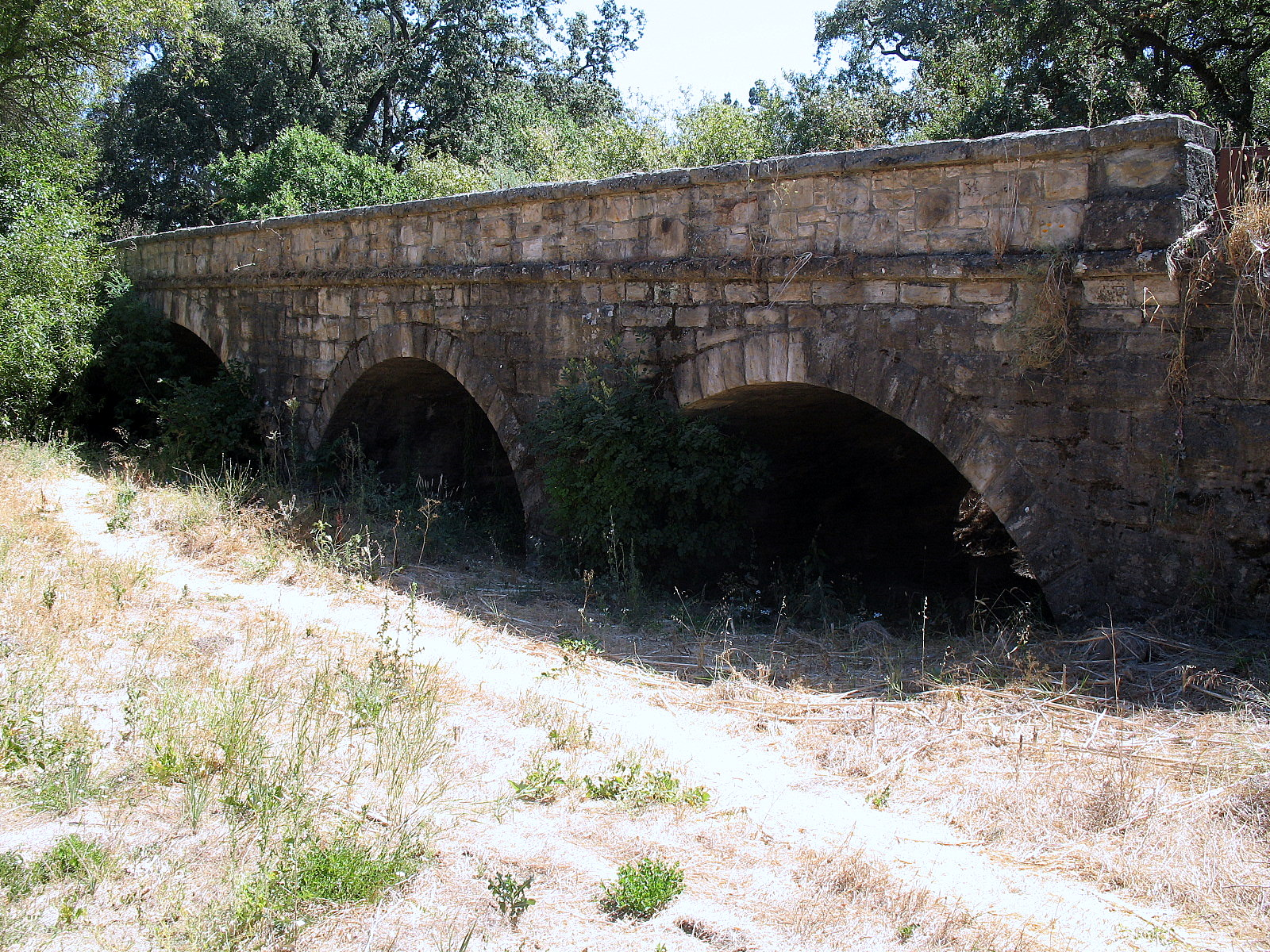
- Milliken Creek Bridge

- Location of the mouth of Milliken Creek in California

Location
- Country: United States
- State: California
- Region: Napa County

Physical characteristics
- Source: Foss Valley
  - location: 5 mi (8 km) east of Yountville
  - coordinates: 38°25′23″N 122°17′11″W
  - elevation: 1,850 ft (560 m)
- Mouth: Napa River
  - location: Napa, California
  - coordinates: 38°19′0″N 122°16′37″W
  - elevation: 10 ft (3.0 m)
- Basin size: 11.3 sq mi (29 km^{2})

Milliken Creek is an 11.9-mile-long (19.2 km) stream in Napa County, California, that is a tributary to the Napa River. There are approximately 7,300 acres (3,000 ha) in this watershed, of which 90 acres (36 ha) are developed as vineyards. Milliken Creek rises on the western slopes of the east side of the Napa Valley and flows through the Silverado Country Club property. Much of this watershed property had once been part of the Mexican land grant Rancho Yajome, which had been granted to General Mariano G. Vallejo. Most of this watershed was wilderness area to at least 1869, and thereafter the lower watershed was begun to be developed as pasture and grazing agricultural uses. In a 1989 stream survey by Earth Metrics, the steelhead fishery was found to be robust up to and including the Silverado Country Club.

== See also ==
- List of watercourses in the San Francisco Bay Area
