= Napa County, California =

County in California, United States

Napa County
- County
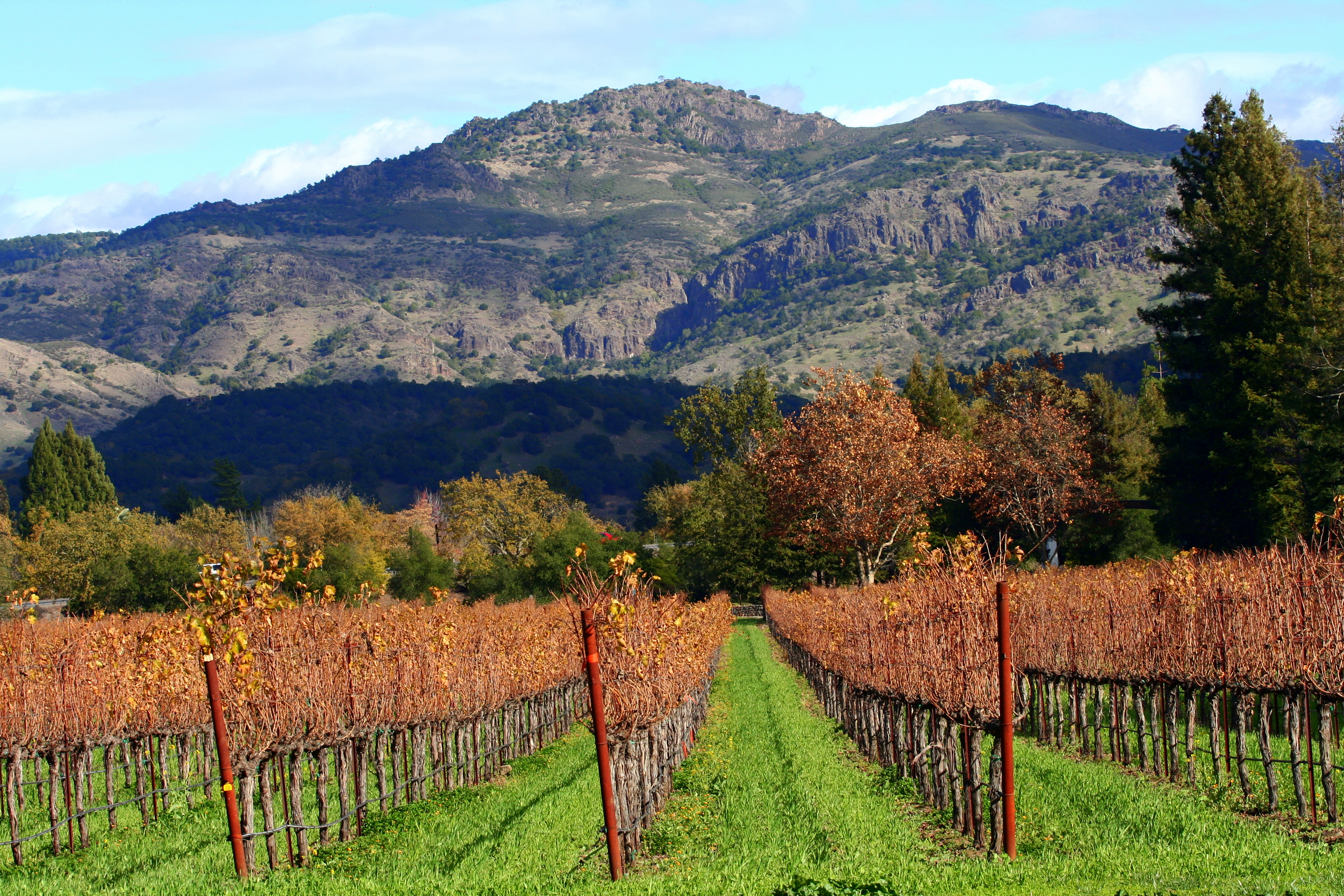
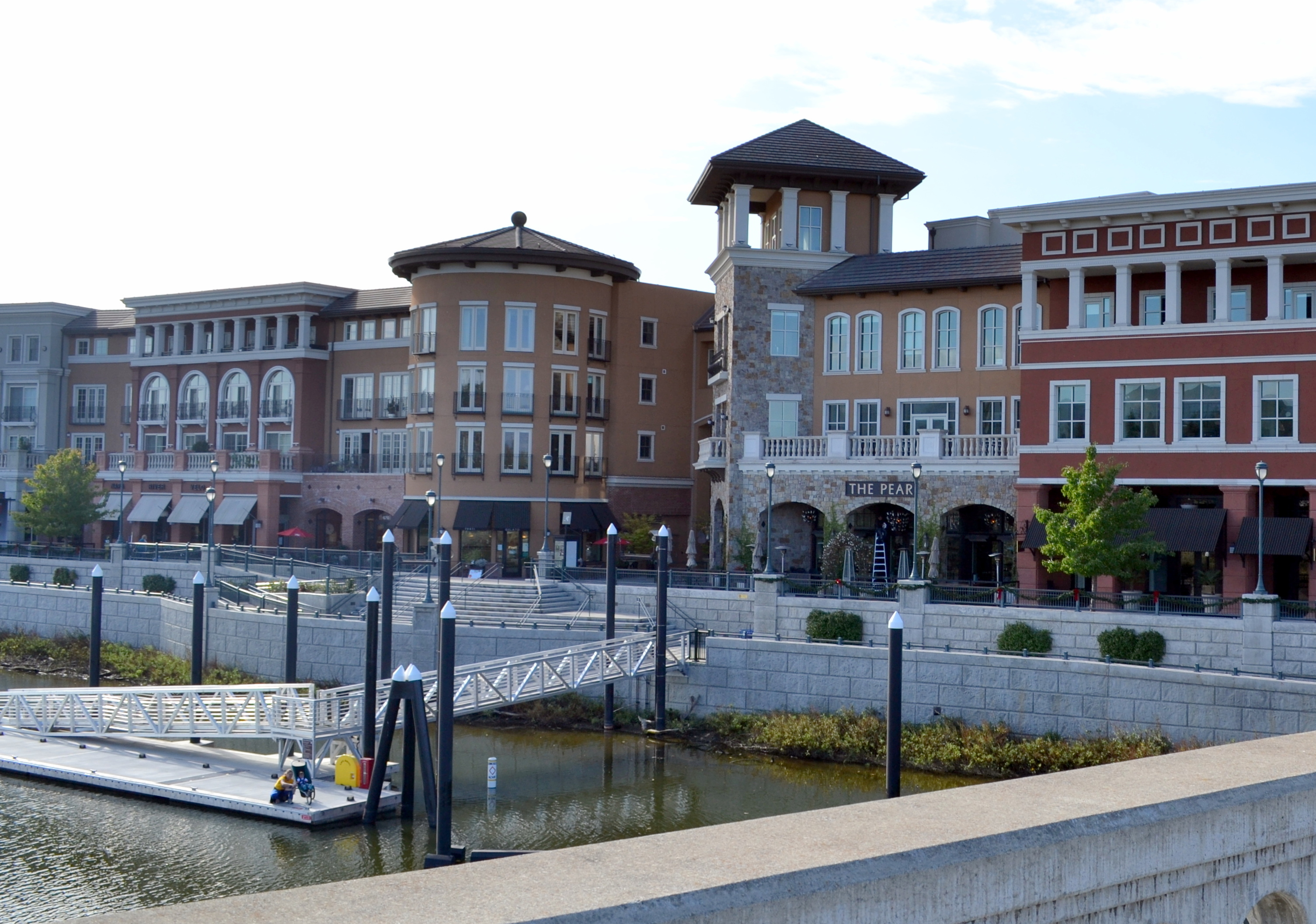
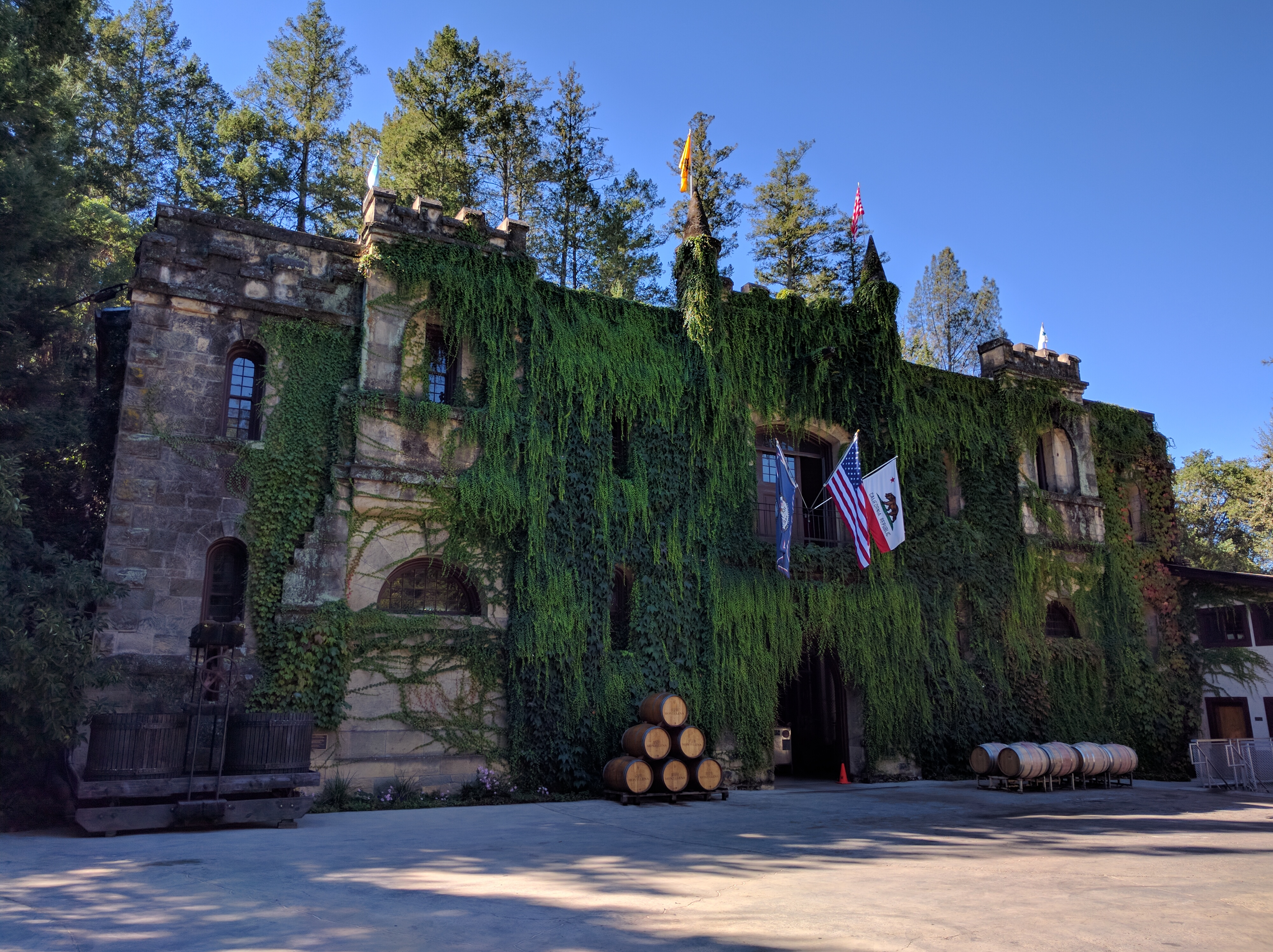
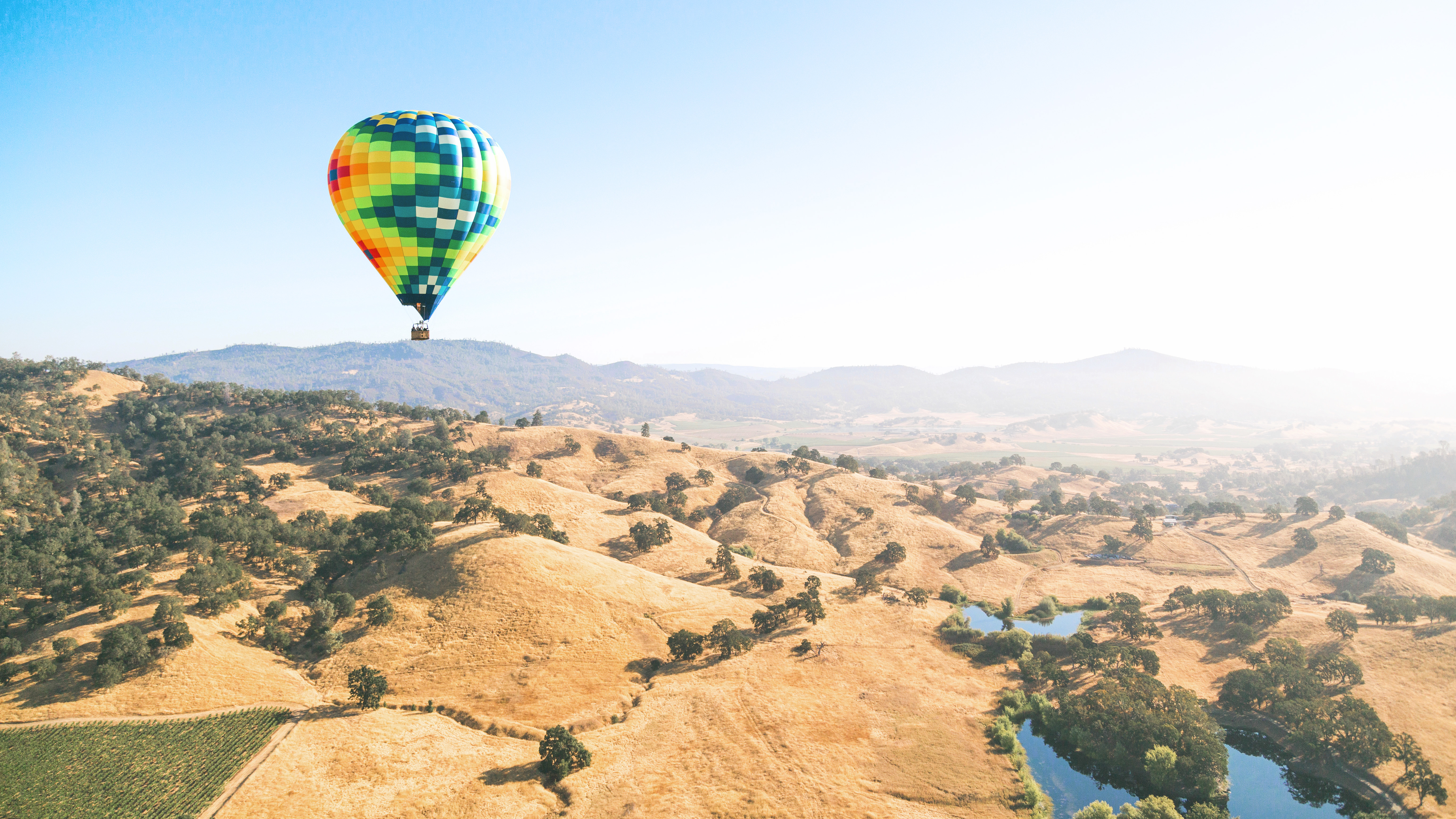
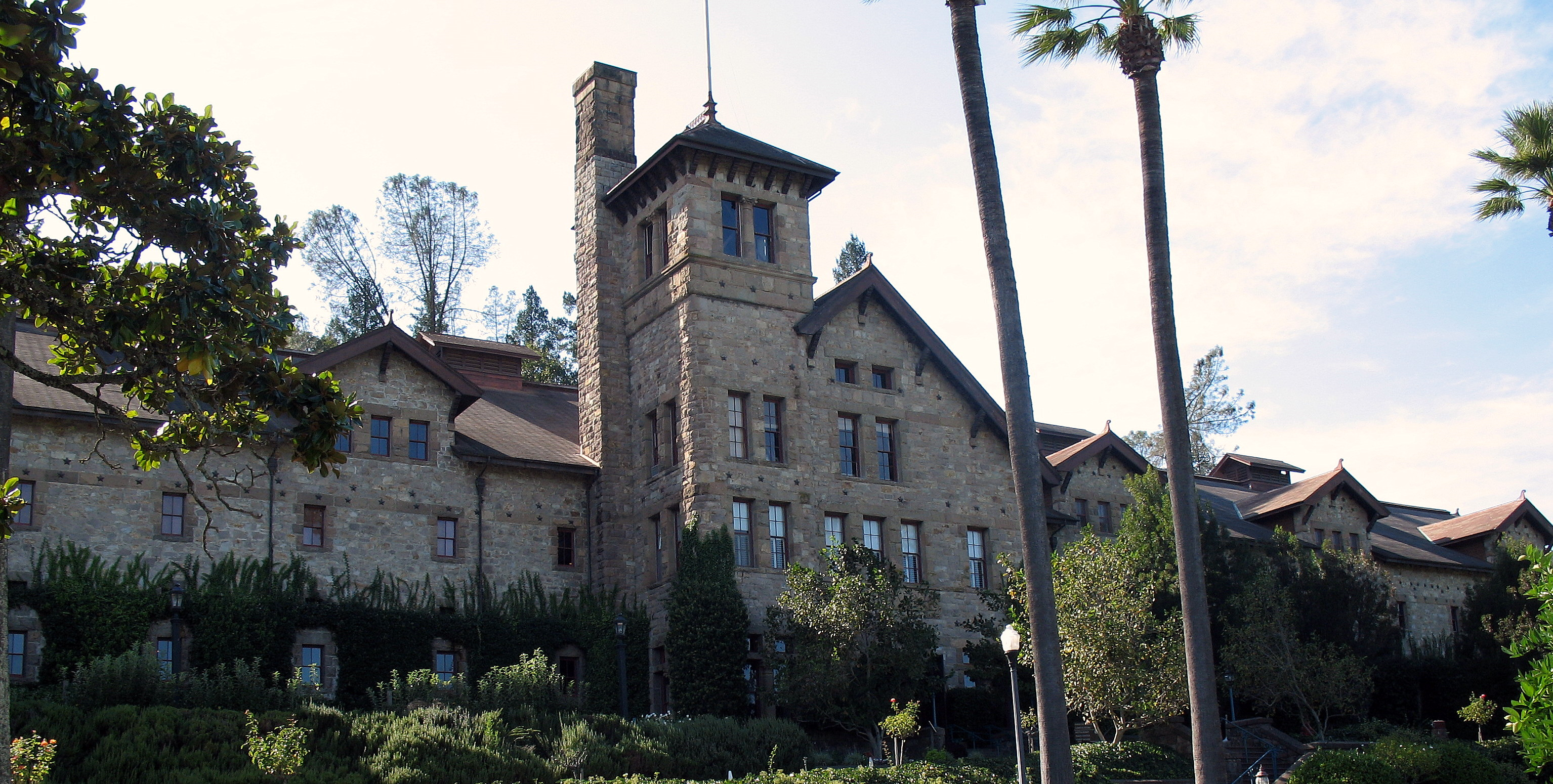
- Wine Country and the Howell Mountains Lake Berryessa Napa Calistoga Napa Valley The Greystone in St. Helena

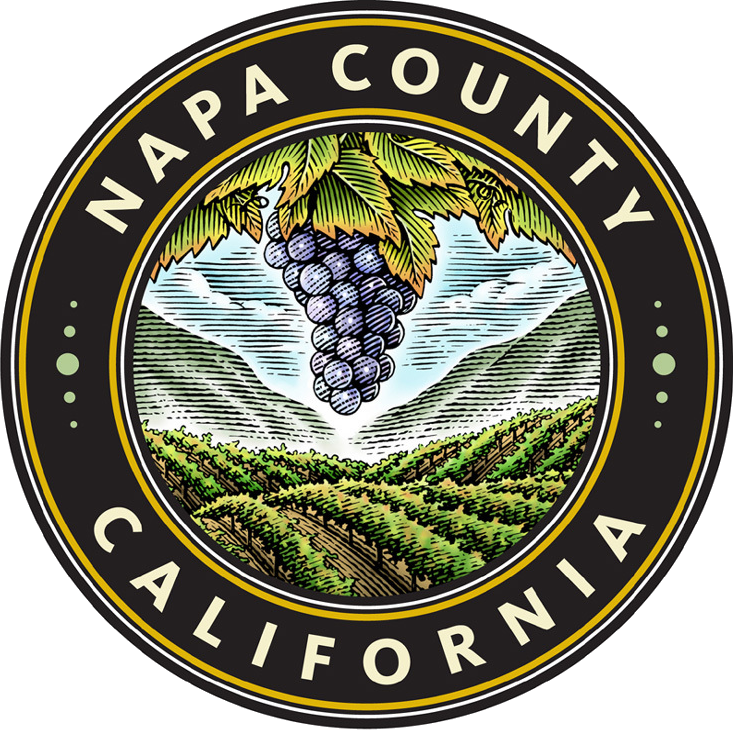
- Seal
- Interactive map of Napa County
- Location in the state of California
- Coordinates: 38.50°N 122.32°W
- Country: United States
- State: California
- Region: San Francisco Bay Area
- Founded: February 18, 1850
- Named for: The city of Napa
- County seat: Napa
- Largest city: Napa

Government
  - Type: Council–CEO
  - Body: Board of Supervisors
  - Chair: Amber Manfree
  - Vice Chair: Liz Alessio
  - Board of Supervisors: Supervisors: Joelle Gallagher; Liz Alessio; Anne Cottrell; Amber Manfree; Belia Ramos
  - County Executive Officer: Ryan Alsop

Area
  - Total: 789 sq mi (2,040 km^{2})
  - Land: 748 sq mi (1,940 km^{2})
  - Water: 40 sq mi (100 km^{2})
- Highest elevation: 4,203 ft (1,281 m)

Population (2020)
  - Total: 138,019
  - Estimate (2025): 132,949 ▼
  - Density: 185/sq mi (71/km^{2})

GDP
  - Total: $13.166 billion (2022)
- Time zone: UTC−8 (Pacific Time Zone)
  - Summer (DST): UTC−7 (Pacific Daylight Time)
- Area code: 707
- FIPS code: 06-055
- GNIS feature ID: 277292
- Website: www.napacounty.gov

Napa County (/ˈnæpə/) is a county north of San Pablo Bay located in the northern portion of the U.S. state of California. As of the 2020 United States census, the population was 138,019. The county seat is the City of Napa. Napa County was one of the original counties of California, created in 1850 at the time of statehood. Parts of the county's territory were given to Lake County in 1861.

Napa County comprises the Napa, CA metropolitan statistical area, which is also included in the San Jose-San Francisco-Oakland, CA combined statistical area. It is one of four North Bay counties.

Napa County, once the producer of many different crops, is known today for its regional wine industry. Napa County rose to the first rank of wine regions, along with France, when local wineries Stag's Leap Wine Cellars and Chateau Montelena won the "Judgment of Paris" in 1976.

== History ==
=== Prehistory–18th century ===
In prehistoric times, the valley was inhabited by the Patwin Native Americans, with possible habitation by Wappo tribes in the northwestern foothills. Most villages are thought to have been constructed near the floodplains of watercourses that drain the valley. Their food consisted of wild roots, acorns, small animals, earthworms, grasshoppers, and bread made from crushed California buckeye kernels. In winter they would construct huts made of tree branches. In summer they camped near rivers and streams. In winter months, they were half-clad in wild animal skins and at other times they wore no clothing. The maximum prehistoric population is thought not to have exceeded 5000 persons.

In 1776, a fort was erected by the Spanish Governor, Felipe de Neve, a short distance northwest of Napa, on an elevated plateau. Russians from Sonoma County's Fort Ross grazed cattle and sheep in the Napa Valley in the early 19th century and in 1841 a survey party from the fort placed a plaque on the summit of Mount Saint Helena.

=== Early 19th century ===
Francis Castro and Father Jose Altimura were the first Europeans to explore the Napa Valley, in 1823. When the first white settlers arrived in the early 1830s, there were six tribes in the valley speaking different dialects and they were often at war with each other. The Mayacomos tribe lived in the area where Calistoga was founded. The Callajomans were in the area near where the town of St. Helena now stands. Further south, the Kymus dwelt in the middle part of the valley. The Napa and Ulcus tribes occupied part of the area where the City of Napa now exists while the Soscol tribe occupied the portion that now makes up the southern end of the valley. Many of the native peoples died during a smallpox epidemic in 1838. Settlers also killed several over claims of cattle theft.

During the era between 1836 and 1846, when California was a province of independent Mexico, the following 13 ranchos were granted in Napa County:

- Carne Humana
- Catacula
- Caymus
- Chimiles
- Entre Napa
- Huichica
- La Jota
- Las Putas
- Locoallomi
- Mallacomes
- Napa
- Tulucay
- Yajome

George C. Yount was an early settler in Napa County and is believed to be the first Anglo-Saxon resident in the county. In 1836 Yount obtained the Mexican grant Rancho Caymus where he built what is said to be the first log house in California. Soon afterward, he built a sawmill and grain mill, and was the first person to plant a vineyard in the county. Following Yount's death in 1865 at age 71, the town of Yountville was named in his honor.

Following his marriage to General Vallejo’s niece Maria Guadalupe Soberanes, Edward Turner Bale became a citizen of Mexico and was granted Rancho Carne Humana in the northern end of the valley. Bale completed building the Bale Grist Mill a few miles north of St. Helena in 1846. Colonel Joseph B. Chiles a guide for one of the earliest immigrant trains to California, was granted Rancho Catacula in 1844.

The Town of Napa was founded on Rancho Entre Napa by Nathan Coombs in 1847.

Following the event of the Mexican–American War, Bear Flag Revolt in 1846 and the Mexican Cession in 1848, settlers were granted deeds from the original ranchos during the 1850s through 1870s. To this day, a number of streets and landmarks around the valley reflect the names of these ranchos and original grantees.

=== Late 19th century ===
Napa County was formed and became one of the original California counties when the state became part of the United States in 1850.

Descendants of George Yount and Captain Edward Bale played key roles in the early development of Napa County. Yount's granddaughter Elizabeth Yount married Thomas Rutherford in 1864. The couple received as a wedding gift from George Yount, land in the area of the valley now known as Rutherford. Rutherford established himself as a serious grower and producer of fine wines in the following years. Bale's oldest daughter Lolita married the seaman Louis Bruck. When Bale died in 1848, Bruck became the executor of the will for the family. He was elected the first mayor of Napa City when incorporated in 1872. Charles Krug, a fellow Prussian compatriot and pioneer viticulturalist at Sonoma, married Lolita's younger sister Caroline with a dowry that included land near the Bale mill. Krug then moved north of St. Helena to establish the valley's first commercial winery.

John Patchett opened the first commercial winery in the county in 1859. The vineyard and wine cellar were in an area now in the city limits of Napa. After working as a winemaker for Patchett, Charles Krug founded his own winery in St. Helena 1861.

The county's population began to grow in the mid-century as pioneers, prospectors, and entrepreneurs moved in and set up residence. During this period, settlers primarily raised cattle and farmed grain and fruit crops. Mineral mining also played a role in the economics of the county. In 1858 the great silver rush began in Napa Valley, and miners flocked to the eastern hills. While gold was being prospected in other areas of the state in the 1850s, Napa County became a center for silver and quicksilver mining. In the 1860s, mining carried on, on a large scale, with quicksilver mines operating in many areas of Napa County.

In 1866 John Lawley established a toll road from Calistoga over Mount Saint Helena to Lake County.

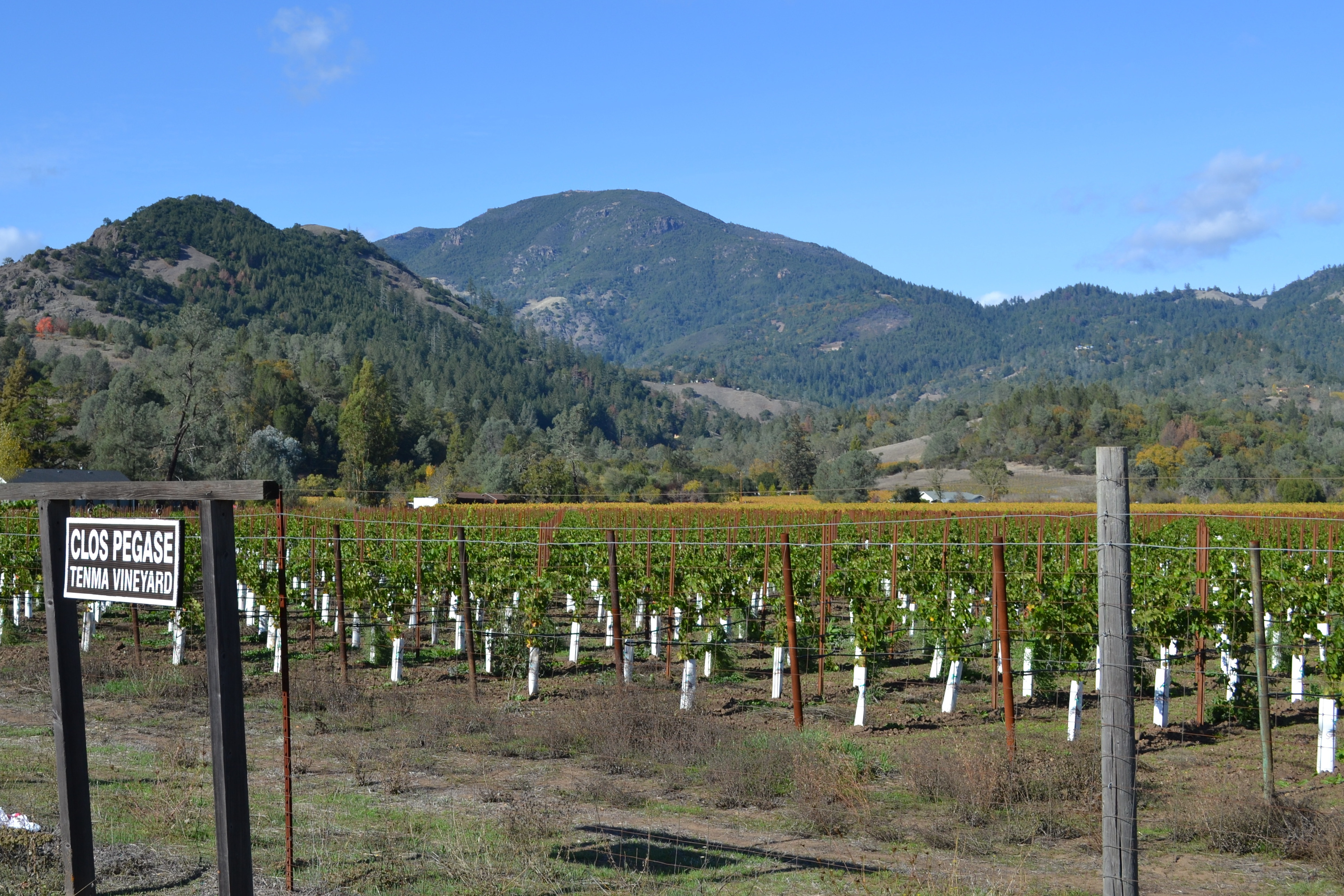
Young vineyard in the valley with Mount Saint Helena in the background

Robert Louis Stevenson's book The Silverado Squatters provides a snapshot of life and insight into some of the characters that lived around the valley during the later part of the 19th century. Stevenson, accompanied by his new bride Fanny Vandegrift and her 12-year-old son from a previous marriage, Lloyd Osbourne, spent the late spring and early summer of 1880 honeymooning in an abandoned bunk house at a played-out mine near the summit of Mount Saint Helena. In the book, Stevenson's descriptive writing style documented his ventures in the area and profiled several of the early pioneers who played a role in shaping the region's commerce and society. Stevenson's book also brought attention to the various spas and hot springs in the county. From Calistoga to Æetna Springs in Pope Valley to Soda Springs Resort a few miles east of Napa, tourists of the late 19th and early 20th centuries made the county their destination much the same as modern day tourists. The resorts became very popular with San Franciscans anxious to escape the cold and foggy weather that often plagues the city to enjoy the warmer climate Napa County offered.

In the mid-1860s, entrepreneur Samuel Brannan purchased land in the northern end of the valley at the foot of Mount Saint Helena and founded Calistoga. He began developing it as a resort town taking advantage of or the area's numerous mineral hot springs. He also founded the Napa Valley Railroad Company in 1864 to bring tourists to Calistoga from San Francisco ferry boats that docked in Vallejo. Brannan's railroad venture failed and was sold at a foreclosure sale in 1869. The railroad eventually came under the ownership of Southern Pacific Railroad late in the 19th century.

The Veterans Home of California Yountville was established in Yountville in 1884 by the San Francisco chapter of the Grand Army of the Republic. The State of California assumed administration of the Home in 1897.

=== 20th and 21st centuries ===
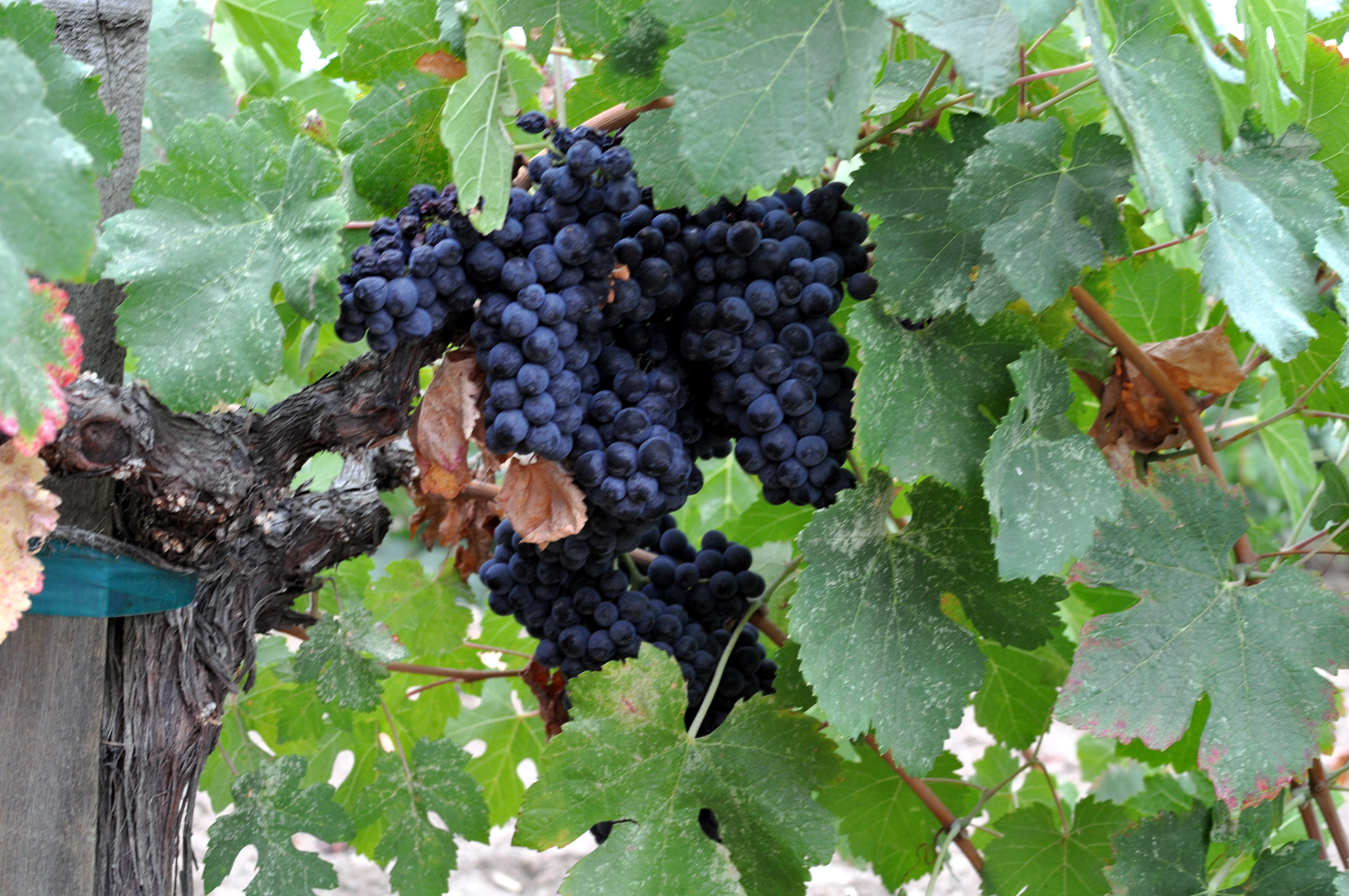
Napa Valley grapes

By the end of the 1900s, farmers had planted over 500,000 fruit and nut trees in the county, especially plums and pears. This helped to soften the blows to the agricultural economy caused by the phylloxera infestation in the county's vineyards and upcoming prohibition that crippled the wine industry, but resulted in a boom for shipping grapes to immigrant, home winemakers across the country.

During World War II, the Basalt Rock Company located south of the City of Napa on the Napa River, built 3 dozen salvage rescue tugs for the United States Navy. German prisoners of war were housed in a Camp Beale satellite prisoner of war camp near Yountville. The prisoners were utilized to supplement a dwindled able bodied agricultural labor force caused by the needs of the American war effort.

Following the war, several new small and medium size businesses began operating in the county. A large majority of these businesses were related to the wine industry and tourism. Agriculture in the county remained very diverse until late in the 20th century when wine grapes again became the primary focus. While vineyards were planted on well over 90% of the agricultural land in the county, by the end of the 20th century, modern day farmers have recently begun exploring the possibility of raising other food crops in order to again diversify and take advantage of growing conditions.

At 3:20 a.m. on August 24, 2014, the area was struck by a magnitude 6.0 earthquake centered 3.7 miles (6.0 km) northwest of the city of American Canyon.

In October 2017, parts of the county were affected by wildfires.

From June to July 2018, the County Fire affected a small part of Napa County after crossing over from Yolo County.

In October 2019, heavy smoke and unscheduled black outs by Pacific Gas and Electric Company of up to 20,000 customers affected the county due to fierce winds and threats from the Kincade Fire.

== Geography ==
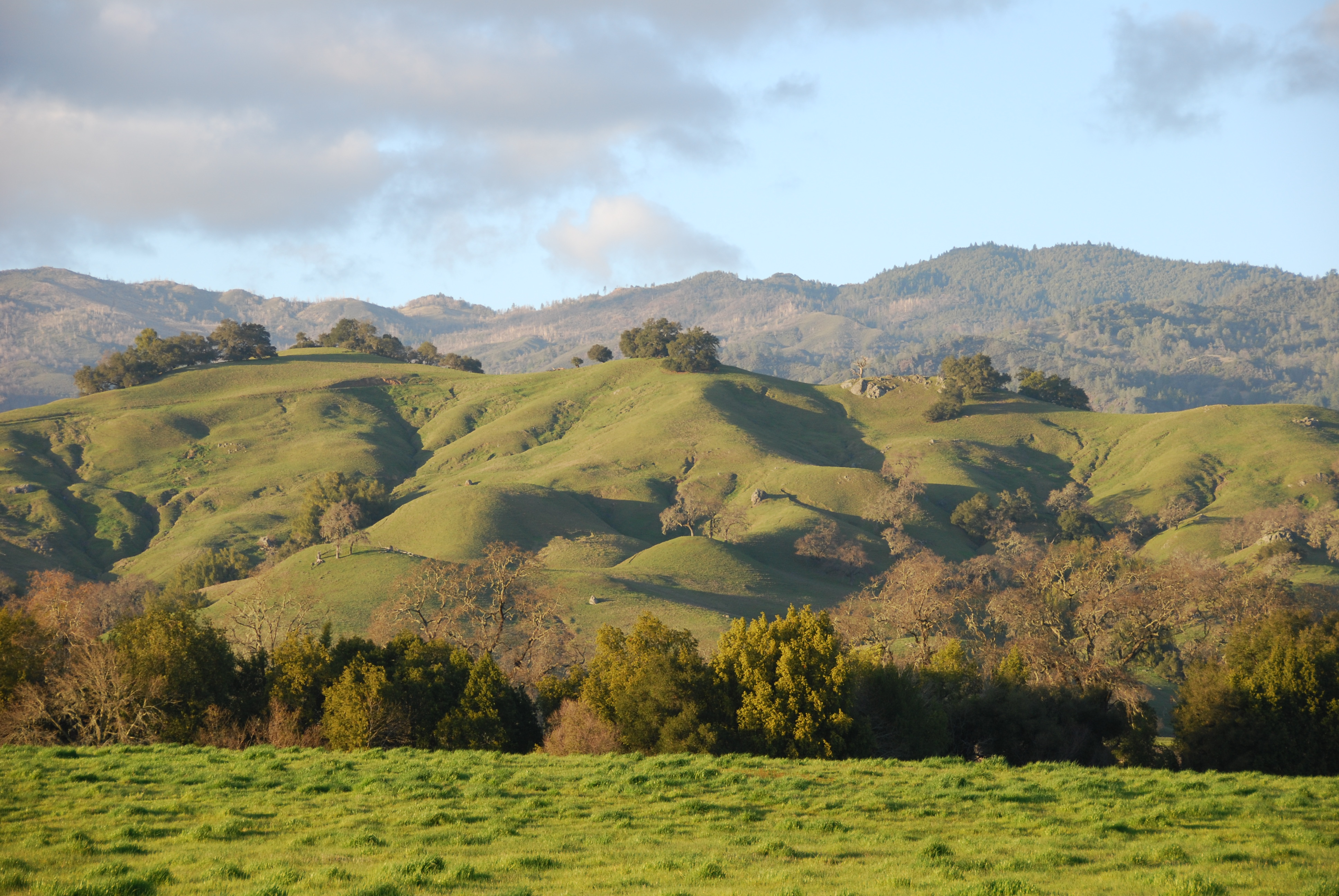
Rolling hills of Napa Valley

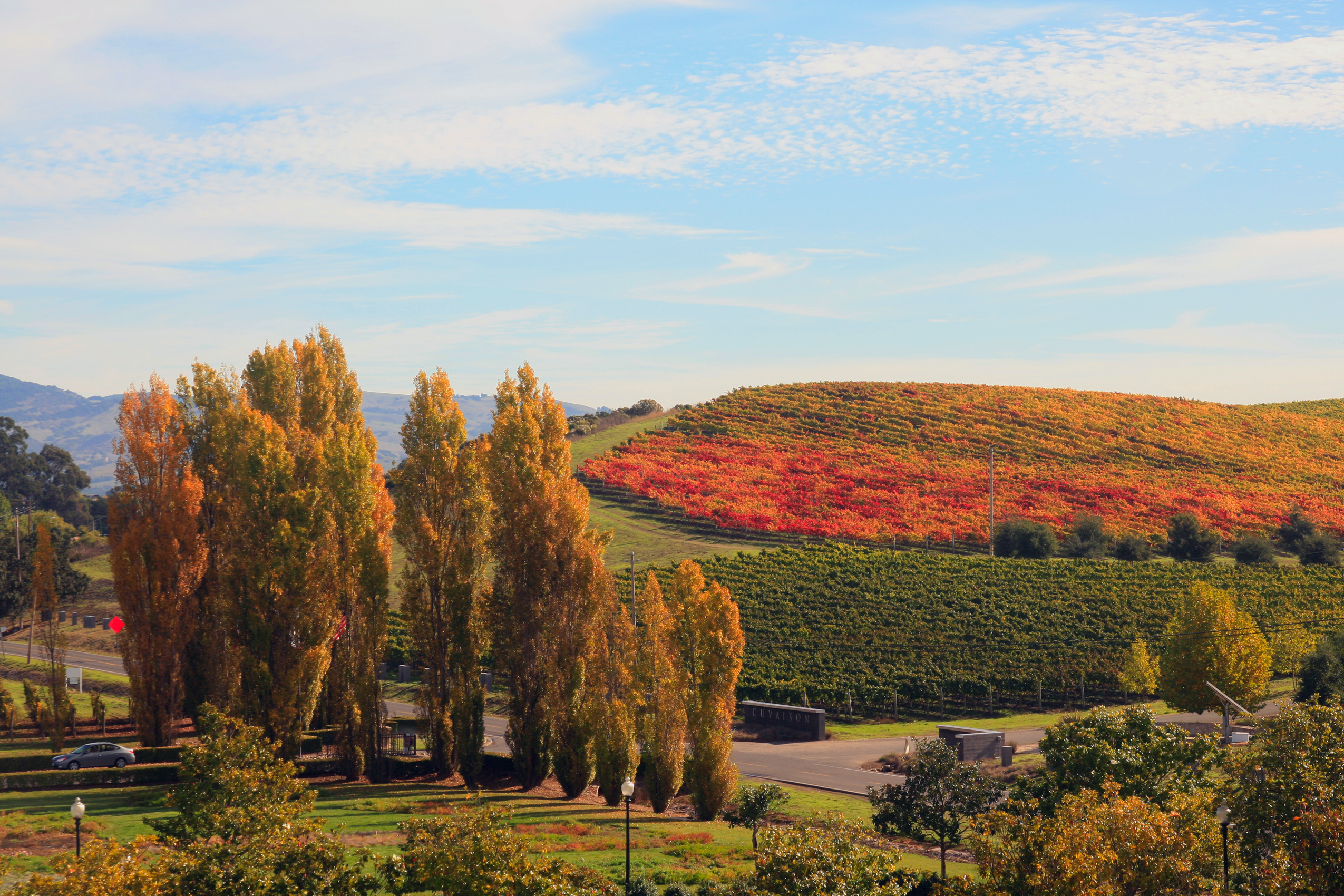
Fall in Napa Valley

According to the U.S. Census Bureau, the county has a total area of 789 square miles (2,040 km^{2}), of which 748 square miles (1,940 km^{2}) is land and 40 square miles (100 km^{2}) (5.1%) is water.

Napa is warmer in the summer than Sonoma County, to the west, or Santa Barbara County, a wine-producing county in southern California. Thus, the Napa wineries favor varietals such as Cabernet Sauvignon, while Pinot noir and Chardonnay are more the specialty of Sonoma and Santa Barbara wineries. At the north end of Napa County, in the Mayacamas Mountains, lies Mount Saint Helena, the Bay Area's second tallest peak at 4,344 feet (1,324 m) and home to Robert Louis Stevenson State Park; Snell Valley is also situated in northern Napa County; the Missimer Wildflower Preserve is within Snell Valley. On the west side of the Napa Valley is Hood Mountain, elevation 2,750 feet (840 m).

Napa County is home to a variety of flora and fauna including numerous rare and endangered species such as Tiburon Indian paintbrush and Contra Costa goldfields.

=== Adjacent counties ===
- Lake County - northwest
- Yolo County - northeast
- Solano County - east
- Sonoma County - west

=== National protected area ===
- San Pablo Bay National Wildlife Refuge (part)

=== Rivers and creeks ===
- Napa River
- Milliken Creek
- Putah Creek

=== Lakes, marshes and reservoirs ===
- East Napa Reservoir
- East Side Reservoir
- Fiege Reservoir
- Lake Berryessa
- Lake Hennessey
- Lake Marie
- Lake Orville
- Lake Whitehead
- Milliken Reservoir
- Napa Sonoma Marsh
- Rector Reservoir
- West Napa Reservoir

== Demographics ==
Historical population
Census	Pop.	Note	%±
1850	405		—
1860	5,521		1,263.2%
1870	7,163		29.7%
1880	13,235		84.8%
1890	16,411		24.0%
1900	16,451		0.2%
1910	19,800		20.4%
1920	20,678		4.4%
1930	22,897		10.7%
1940	28,503		24.5%
1950	46,603		63.5%
1960	65,890		41.4%
1970	79,140		20.1%
1980	99,199		25.3%
1990	110,765		11.7%
2000	124,279		12.2%
2010	136,484		9.8%
2020	138,019		1.1%
2025 (est.)	132,949	▼	−3.7%
U.S. Decennial Census; 1790–1960 1900–1990; 1990–2000 2010 2020

=== 2020 census ===
As of the 2020 census, the county had a population of 138,019. The median age was 42.9 years. 20.0% of residents were under the age of 18 and 20.8% of residents were 65 years of age or older. For every 100 females there were 96.5 males, and for every 100 females age 18 and over there were 94.6 males.

There were 49,738 households in the county, of which 30.9% had children under the age of 18 living with them and 26.8% had a female householder with no spouse or partner present. About 25.0% of all households were made up of individuals and 13.2% had someone living alone who was 65 years of age or older.

There were 55,448 housing units, of which 10.3% were vacant. Among occupied housing units, 61.2% were owner-occupied and 38.8% were renter-occupied. The homeowner vacancy rate was 1.2% and the rental vacancy rate was 4.7%.

The racial makeup of the county was 55.2% White, 1.8% Black or African American, 1.4% American Indian and Alaska Native, 7.8% Asian, 0.3% Native Hawaiian and Pacific Islander, 18.6% from some other race, and 15.0% from two or more races. Hispanic or Latino residents of any race comprised 35.4% of the population.

85.3% of residents lived in urban areas, while 14.7% lived in rural areas.

=== Racial and ethnic composition ===
Napa County, California – Racial and ethnic composition Note: the US Census treats Hispanic/Latino as an ethnic category. This table excludes Latinos from the racial categories and assigns them to a separate category. Hispanics/Latinos may be of any race.
Race / Ethnicity (NH = Non-Hispanic)	Pop 1980	Pop 1990	Pop 2000	Pop 2010	Pop 2020	% 1980	% 1990	% 2000	% 2010	% 2020
White alone (NH)	86,373	89,453	85,932	76,967	68,909	87.07%	80.76%	69.14%	56.39%	49.93%
Black or African American alone (NH)	866	1,167	1,527	2,440	2,300	0.87%	1.05%	1.23%	1.79%	1.67%
Native American or Alaska Native alone (NH)	725	687	642	544	507	0.73%	0.62%	0.52%	0.40%	0.37%
Asian alone (NH)	2,095	3,391	3,641	8,986	10,520	2.11%	3.06%	2.93%	6.58%	7.62%
Native Hawaiian or Pacific Islander alone (NH)	x	x	254	313	316	0.20%	0.23%	0.20%	0.23%	0.23%
Other race alone (NH)	504	126	226	221	910	0.51%	0.11%	0.18%	0.16%	0.66%
Mixed race or Multiracial (NH)	x	x	2,641	3,003	5,728	x	x	2.13%	2.20%	4.15%
Hispanic or Latino (any race)	8,636	15,941	29,416	44,010	48,829	8.71%	14.39%	23.67%	32.25%	35.38%
Total	99,199	110,765	124,279	136,484	138,019	100.00%	100.00%	100.00%	100.00%	100.00%

=== American Community Survey 2025 data ===
The United States Census Bureau estimated that in 2025, Napa County’s population was 132.949. It was also estimated that the county's population was 47,67% Non-Hispanic White, 37,37% Hispanic or Latino, 2,03% Non-Hispanic Black, 8,73% Asian, 0,38% Native American, 0,25% Pacific Islander, and 3,56% Multiracial.

Total	Population	Percentage
Non-Hispanic White	63.381	47,67%
Hispanic or Latino	49.677	37,37%
Non-Hispanic Black	2.705	2,03%
Asian	11.605	8,73%
Native American	508	0,38%
Pacific Islander	334	0,25%
Non-Hispanic Multiracial	4.739	3,56%

=== 2010 census ===
The 2010 United States census reported Napa County had a population of 136,484. The racial makeup of Napa County was 97,525 (71.5%) White, 2,668 (2.0%) African American, 1,058 (0.8%) Native American, 9,223 (6.8%) Asian, 372 (0.3%) Pacific Islander, 20,058 (14.7%) from other races, and 5,580 (4.1%) from two or more races. Hispanic or Latino of any race were 44,010 persons (32.2%).

Population reported at 2010 United States census
The County	Total; Population	White	African; American	Native; American	Asian	Pacific; Islander	other races	two or more races	Hispanic or Latino (of any race)
Napa County	136,484	97,525	2,668	1,058	9,223	372	20,058	5,580	44,010
Incorporated city	Total; Population	White	African; American	Native; American	Asian	Pacific; Islander	other races	two or more races	Hispanic or Latino (of any race)
American Canyon	19,454	7,564	1,535	142	6,396	176	2,357	1,284	5,009
Calistoga	5,155	3,735	27	21	47	10	968	347	2,545
Napa	76,915	57,754	486	637	1,755	144	13,256	2,883	28,923
St. Helena	5,814	4,525	25	35	98	9	978	144	1,914
Yountville	2,933	2,623	38	30	49	0	92	101	289
Census-designated place	Total; Population	White	African; American	Native; American	Asian	Pacific; Islander	other races	two or more races	Hispanic or Latino (of any race)
Angwin	3,051	2,124	139	22	339	5	234	188	625
Deer Park	1,267	1,108	13	9	51	0	61	25	147
Moskowite Corner	211	183	1	14	1	0	8	4	25
Oakville	71	26	0	1	1	1	38	4	45
Rutherford	164	123	0	0	0	0	30	11	70
Silverado Resort	1,095	1,010	1	1	36	4	28	15	59
Other unincorporated areas	Total; Population	White	African; American	Native; American	Asian	Pacific; Islander	other races	two or more races	Hispanic or Latino (of any race)
All others not CDPs (combined)	20,354	16,750	403	146	450	23	2,008	574	4,359

=== 2000 census ===
As of the census of 2000, there were 124,279 people, 45,402 households, and 30,691 families residing in the county. The population density was 165 inhabitants per square mile (64/km^{2}). There were 48,554 housing units at an average density of 64 units per square mile (25 units/km^{2}). The racial makeup of the county in 2010 was 56.4% non-Hispanic White, 1.8% non-Hispanic Black or African American, 0.4% Native American, 6.6% Asian, 0.2% Pacific Islander, 0.2% from other races, and 2.2% from two or more races. 32.2% of the population were Hispanic or Latino of any race. 11.9% were of German, 9.7% English, 8.6% Irish, 6.7% Italian and 5.3% American ancestry according to Census 2000. 75.3% spoke English, 19.5% Spanish and 1.1% Tagalog as their first language.

There were 45,402 households, out of which 31.4% had children under the age of 18 living with them, 53.2% were married couples living together, 9.9% had a female householder with no husband present, and 32.4% were non-families. 25.8% of all households were made up of individuals, and 11.6% had someone living alone who was 65 years of age or older. The average household size was 2.62 and the average family size was 3.16.

In the county, the population was spread out, with 24.1% under the age of 18, 8.5% from 18 to 24, 27.7% from 25 to 44, 24.3% from 45 to 64, and 15.4% who were 65 years of age or older. The median age was 38 years. For every 100 females, there were 99.6 males. For every 100 females age 18 and over, there were 97.4 males.

== Government ==
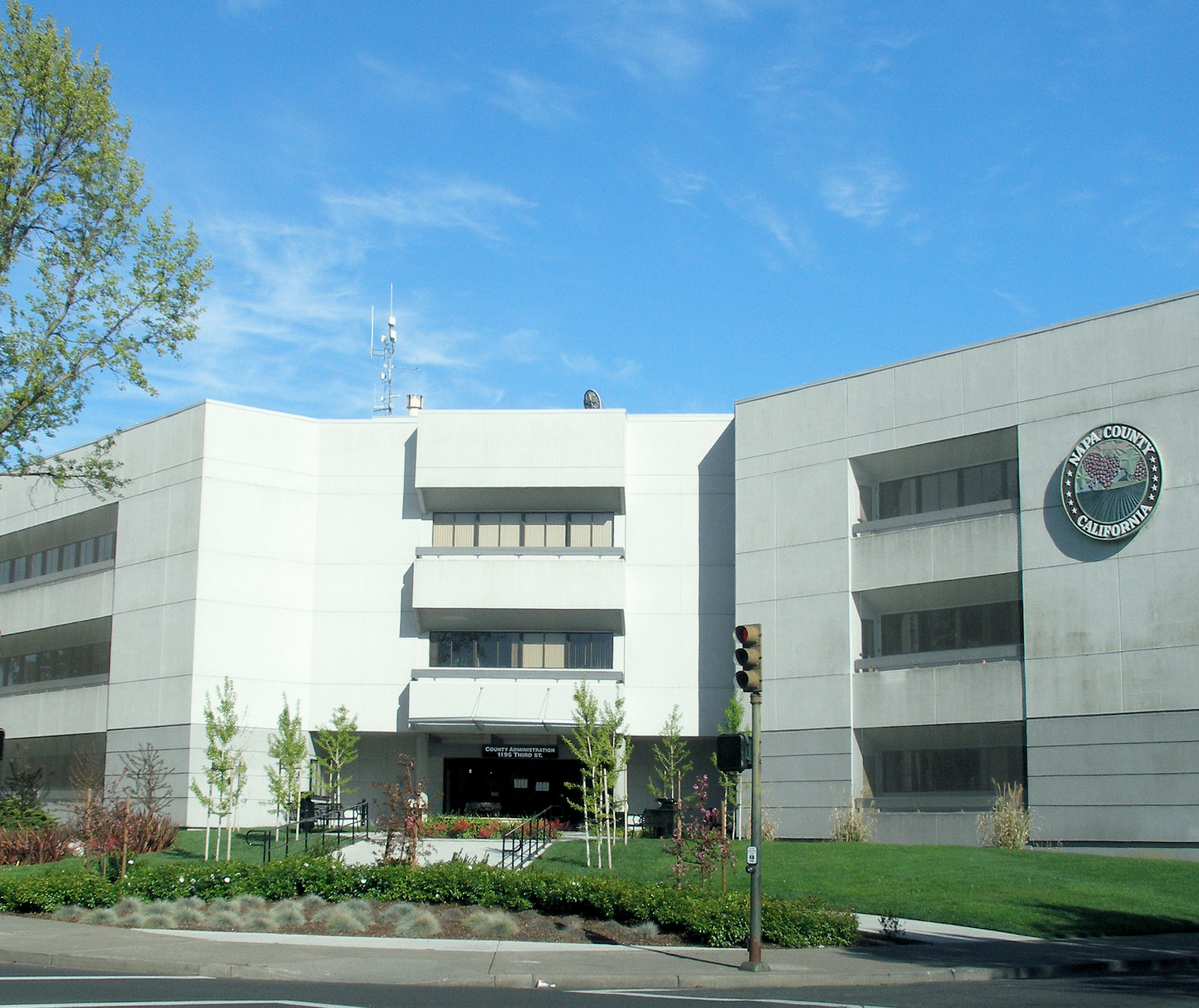
The County Administration Building at the county seat, the City of Napa

Napa County is a General Law County governed by a five-member Board of Supervisors. The supervisors are:

- District 1: Joelle Gallagher,
- District 2: Liz Alessio,
- District 3: Anne Cottrell,
- District 4: Amber Manfree, and
- District 5: Belia Ramos

In the United States House of Representatives, Napa County is in California's 4th congressional district, represented by Democrat Mike Thompson.

In the California State Legislature, Napa County is in the 4th Assembly district, represented by Democrat Cecilia Aguiar-Curry, and the 3rd senatorial district, represented by Democrat Christopher Cabaldon.

The county is one of three counties in California to establish a separate department to deal with corrections pursuant to California Government Code §23013, along with Santa Clara County and Madera County.

== Politics ==
=== Overview ===
United States presidential election results for Napa County, California (Note: This "other" vote comprised 2,432 votes for Progressive Theodore Roosevelt (who was the official "Republican" nominee in California), 478 votes for Socialist Eugene V. Debs, 126 votes for Prohibition Party candidate Eugene W. Chafin, and 21 scattered write-in votes (none of which were for national Republican nominee William Howard Taft))
Year	Republican		Democratic		Third party(ies)	
Year	No.	%	No.	%	No.	%
1880	1,199	51.90%	1,082	46.84%	29	1.26%
1884	1,593	55.37%	1,256	43.66%	28	0.97%
1888	1,763	53.20%	1,496	45.14%	55	1.66%
1892	1,769	50.79%	1,478	42.43%	236	6.78%
1896	2,032	57.03%	1,472	41.31%	59	1.66%
1900	2,017	56.71%	1,432	40.26%	108	3.04%
1904	2,425	63.30%	1,135	29.63%	271	7.07%
1908	2,405	59.08%	1,336	32.82%	330	8.11%
1912	0	0.00%	2,662	46.55%	3,057	53.45%
1916	3,914	52.46%	3,088	41.39%	459	6.15%
1920	4,448	70.99%	1,444	23.05%	374	5.97%
1924	3,605	54.82%	670	10.19%	2,301	34.99%
1928	4,699	57.48%	3,422	41.86%	54	0.66%
1932	3,521	36.97%	5,745	60.32%	258	2.71%
1936	3,973	38.24%	6,270	60.35%	147	1.41%
1940	5,924	46.09%	6,771	52.68%	158	1.23%
1944	7,092	47.48%	7,748	51.87%	96	0.64%
1948	8,724	52.82%	7,207	43.64%	585	3.54%
1952	14,065	61.46%	8,655	37.82%	163	0.71%
1956	13,610	55.93%	10,623	43.66%	100	0.41%
1960	15,125	52.56%	13,499	46.91%	154	0.54%
1964	11,567	37.06%	19,580	62.74%	63	0.20%
1968	14,270	43.76%	14,762	45.27%	3,580	10.98%
1972	23,403	59.61%	14,529	37.01%	1,329	3.39%
1976	20,839	51.83%	18,048	44.89%	1,318	3.28%
1980	23,632	53.67%	14,898	33.83%	5,505	12.50%
1984	26,322	57.77%	18,599	40.82%	640	1.40%
1988	23,235	50.19%	22,283	48.14%	772	1.67%
1992	15,662	29.30%	24,215	45.30%	13,578	25.40%
1996	17,439	36.09%	24,588	50.89%	6,292	13.02%
2000	20,633	39.89%	28,097	54.32%	2,994	5.79%
2004	22,059	38.97%	33,666	59.48%	874	1.54%
2008	19,484	32.67%	38,849	65.14%	1,309	2.19%
2012	19,526	34.28%	35,870	62.97%	1,572	2.76%
2016	17,411	28.37%	39,199	63.87%	4,762	7.76%
2020	20,676	28.66%	49,817	69.05%	1,657	2.30%
2024	20,357	31.05%	43,212	65.91%	1,992	3.04%

Historically, Napa County was heavily Republican. It only supported a Democrat for president seven times – four of which were for Franklin D. Roosevelt – in the thirty-two presidential elections between 1860 and 1988. However, a Republican hasn't carried the county since George H. W. Bush in 1988. It is now one of the most Democratic counties in California, and is reckoned as part of the solid bloc of blue counties in the northern part of the state.

On November 4, 2008, Napa County voted 56 percent against Proposition 8, which amended the California Constitution to ban same-sex marriages. According to the California Secretary of State, as of February 10, 2017, Napa County has 76,038 registered voters, out of 93,926 eligible (81.0%). Of those, 35,660 (46.9%) are registered Democrats, 18,417 (24.2%) are registered Republicans, and 17,827 (23.4%) have declined to state a political party.

Gubernatorial elections results

Gubernatorial elections results
Year	Republican	Democratic
2022	35.3% 17,671	64.7% 32,437
2018	35.2% 19,834	64.8% 36,513
2014	31.8% 12,059	68.2% 25,846
2010	38.1% 17,873	57.1% 26,766
2006	54.6% 23,187	38.8% 16,504
2002	36.8% 13,483	47.8% 17,516
1998	35.2% 15,193	59.9% 25,809
1994	54.7% 23,429	40.7% 17,454
1990	47.2% 18,931	47.5% 19,017
1986	68.1% 26,445	29.5% 11,456
1982	54.2% 21,812	42.3% 17,042
1978	41.1% 15,621	50.5% 19,202
1974	50.1% 16,048	47.4% 15,200
1970	55.3% 16,844	42.7% 13,018
1966	59.5% 17,740	40.5% 12,060
1962	44.7% 12,326	53.5% 14,748

=== Voter registration ===
Population and registered voters (2017)
Total population	135,377	
Registered voters (Note: Percentage of registered voters with respect to total population. Percentages of party members with respect to registered voters follow.)	76,038	56.2%
Democratic	35,660	46.9%
Republican	18,417	24.2%
Democratic–Republican spread	+17,243	+22.7%
American Independent	2,311	3.0%
Green	639	0.8%
Libertarian	589	0.8%
Peace and Freedom	207	0.3%
Other	388	0.5%
No party preference	17,827	23.4%

==== Cities by population and voter registration ====
Cities by population and voter registration
City	Population	Registered voters	Democratic	Republican	D–R spread	Other	No party preference
American Canyon	18,489	56.9%	51.5%	15.7%	+35.8%	4.4%	28.4%
Calistoga	5,159	46.7%	53.2%	18.8%	+34.4%	5.2%	22.8%
Napa	76,560	54.8%	48.1%	23.7%	+24.4%	5.6%	22.6%
St. Helena	5,838	57.2%	47.3%	24.8%	+22.5%	4.2%	23.7%
Yountville	2,943	67.9%	45.6%	25.9%	+19.7%	6.5%	22.0%

== Economy ==
Major Economic Activity in Napa County (Highest number in each category highlighted)

Economic Sector (NAICS code description)	Number of paid employees (2012)	Annual Payroll (2012)	Number of Establishments (2012)	Gross Revenue (2012)	Major Employers
Health Care and Social Assistance	11,022	$667,321,000	406		Kaiser Permanente, Queen of the Valley Medical Center, St. Helena Hospital, Veterans Home, Napa State Hospital, Community Health Clinic Ole, The Doctors Company
Accommodation and Food Services	10,025	$246,578,000	375		Napa Valley Marriott Hotel & Spa, The Carneros Inn, The Meritage Resort and Spa, Silverado Resort The French Laundry, The Restaurant at Meadowood, Auberge du Soleil, Bouchon, La Toque, Solbar, Terra
Manufacturing (Includes winemaking)	9,981	$672,448,000	431	$4,576,801,000	Over 500 wineries; See Napa Valley Vinters for details
Retail trade	6,469	$191,398,000	536		Walmart, Central Valley Builder's Supply, Bell Products
Administrative and Support and Waste Management and Remediation Services (Includes government)	3,340	$96,671,000	200		County of Napa, City of Napa, City of American Canyon
Construction	2,483	$138,800,000	409		Nova Group
Educational Services	(1000–2499)	$44,100,000	56		Napa Valley Unified School District, Napa County Office of Education
Wholesale trade	2,275	$146,131,000	200		
Agriculture (Includes grapegrowing)	601–6790 (seasonal)	$22,526,000	40		Vineyard management companies and farmers, see Napa Farm Bureau for details
Professional, Scientific and Professional Services	1,676	$99,988,000	396		
Finance and Insurance	1,565	$136,673,000	203		The Bank of Napa, Wells Fargo, Bank of America, Umpqua Bank, Rabobank, Westamerica Bank

=== Wine ===
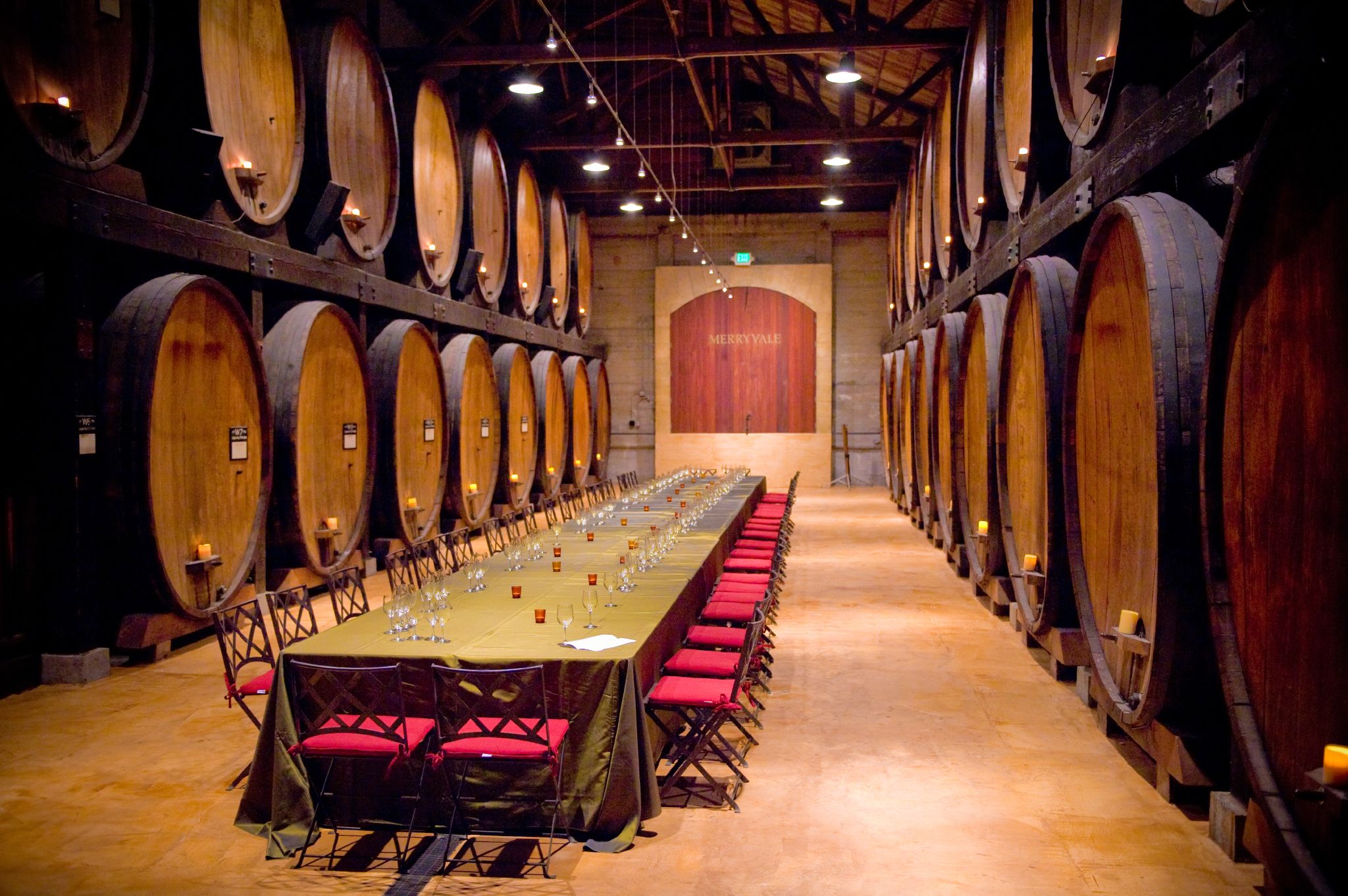
Barrel room at Merryvale Winery in the valley

Napa Valley is widely considered one of the top American Viticultural Areas in California, and all of the United States, with a history dating back to the early nineteenth century. By the end of the nineteenth century, there were more than 140 wineries in the area. Several still exist in the valley including Charles Krug Winery, Schramsberg, Chateau Montelena, Nichelini and Beringer. Viticulture in Napa suffered a setback when Prohibition was enacted in 1920. Furthering the damage was an infestation of the phylloxera root louse which killed many of the vines through the valley. These two events caused many wineries to shut down and stalled the growth of the wine industry in Napa County for years. But for many Italian and Swiss families as farm labourers in the vineyards, Prohibition offered the unique opportunity for the growing and shipping of grapes to immigrant home winemakers across the country. Charles Forni, who received a gold coin as his first U.S. dollar upon arriving, rose to be a large shipper. The Mondavi family came West from the Minnesota ore country to Lodi to ship grapes to the "Italian Club" miners. When Prohibition stopped in 1933, the price of grapes crashed to below $24 per ton. Then A.P. Giannini, founder of Bank of America in San Francisco, started to promote to rebuild the commerce of wine and viticulture. Following the Second World War, the wine industry in Napa again began to grow.

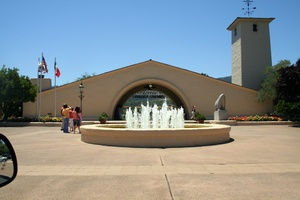
Robert Mondavi Winery, Napa

In 1965, Napa Valley icon Robert Mondavi broke away from his family's Charles Krug estate to found his own. This was the first new large scale winery to be established in the valley since before prohibition. After the establishment of the Mondavi estate, the number of wineries in the valley continued to grow, as did the region's reputation. Consumer trends followed the 60s free lifestyle for experimentation. The old "paesano" customers of "dego red" gallon jug wines changed to young women who considered white wine, not beer, as their new drink of choice for romance. Robert Mondavi Winery attracted new wine aficionados by introducing the larger, 1.5-liter wine bottle for an image of affordable quality.

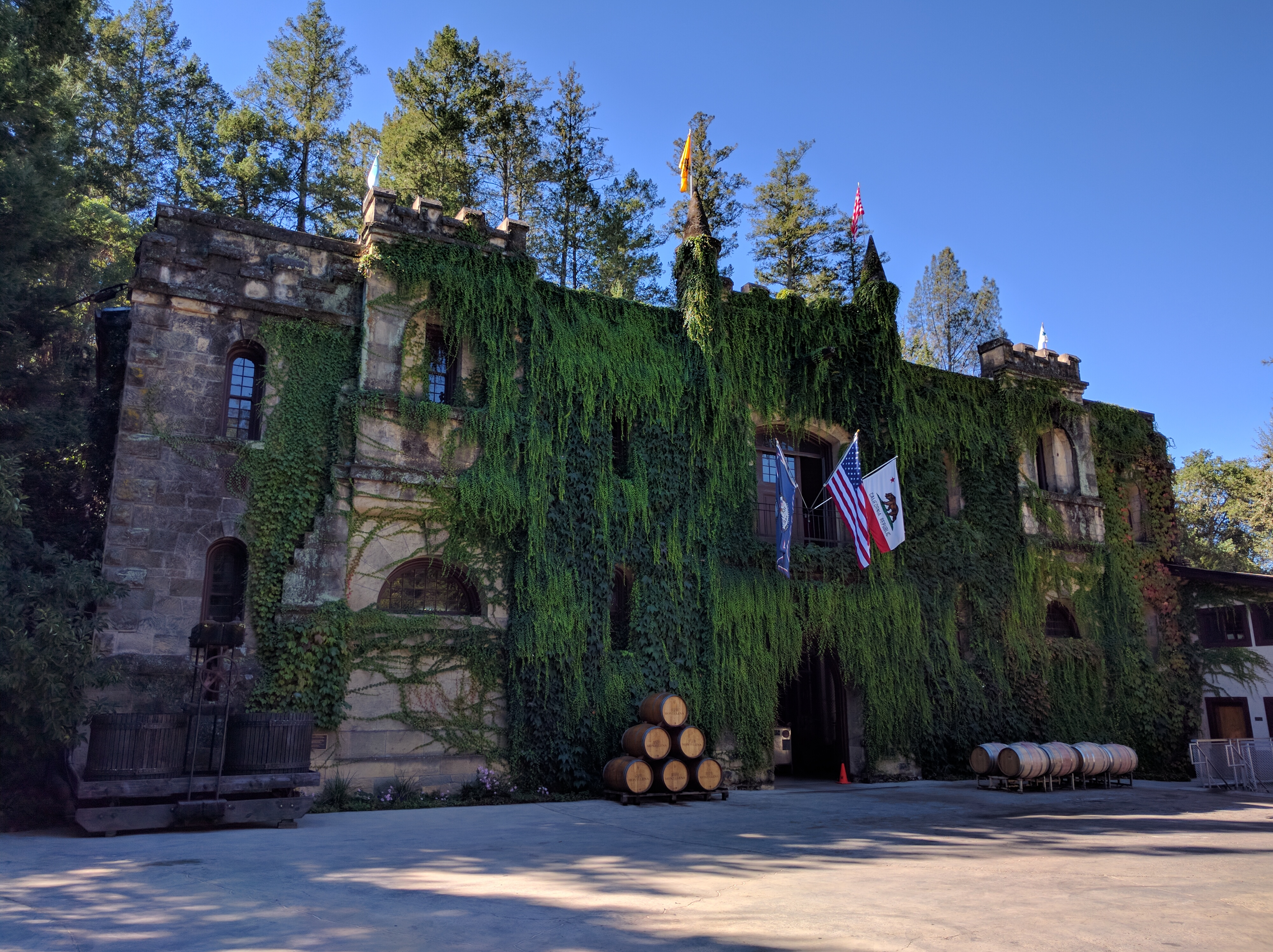
Chateau Montelena

In addition to large scale wineries, Napa Valley's boutique wineries produce some of the world's best wines. The producers of these wines include but are not limited to: Araujo, Bryant Family, Monticello Vineyards, Ceja Vineyards, Chimney Rock Winery, Colgin Cellars, Dalla Valle Maya, Diamond Creek, Dominus Estate, Duckhorn Vineyards, Dunn Howell Mountain, Grace Family Vineyards, Harlan Estate, Husic, Kistler, Jericho Canyon Vineyards, Marcassin, Rutherford Hill Winery, Screaming Eagle, Sequoia Grove, Shafer Hillside Select, Steltzner Vineyards, and Bouchaine Vineyards.

Today Napa Valley features more than four hundred wineries and grows many different grape varieties including Cabernet Sauvignon, Chardonnay, Merlot, Zinfandel, and other popular varietals. As many as five million people visit the area each year.

== Agricultural preservation ==
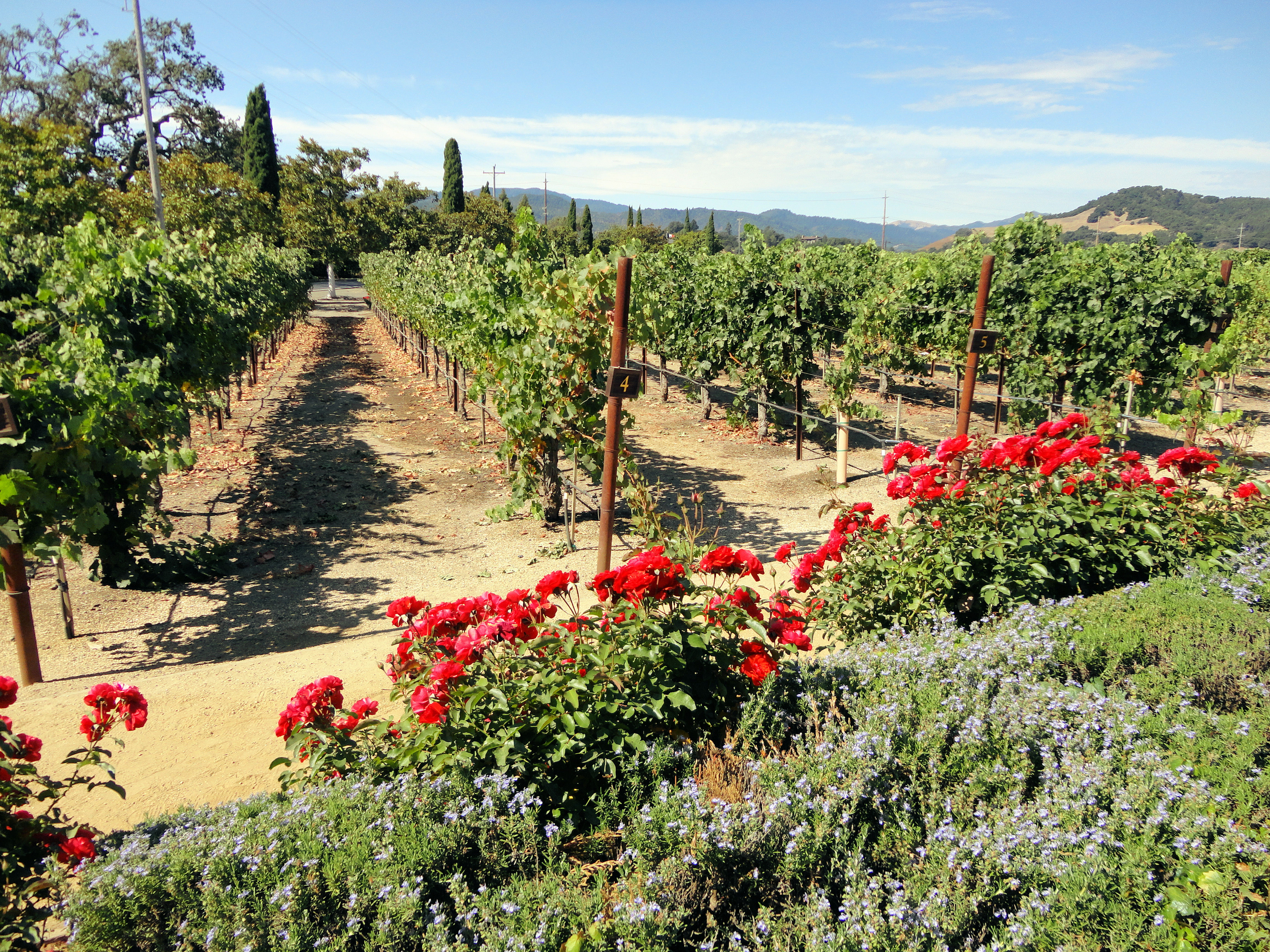
A vineyard in the valley

Napa County has maintained a rural agricultural environment in a large part of the valley floor while neighboring Sonoma, Solano, and Yolo counties have allowed large tracts of former farmland to be rezoned for commercial and residential development. In 1968 vintners and civic leaders in the county seized an opportunity to preserve farmland by taking advantage of the Williamson Act enacted by the California Legislature to give landowners property tax relief for designating their land for agricultural purposes. This agricultural preserve on the floor of the valley in unincorporated areas between Napa and Calistoga was the first of its kind in the state. Initially, the preserve encompassed 23,000 acres (93.1 km^{2}), but it has grown to more than 30,000 acres (121.4 km^{2}). In 2010, legislation was passed by the California State Senate and State Assembly and sent to the Governor for signing in the form of Senate Bill 1142. This bill was created to provide relief stream of funding to augment the Williamson Act.

The county has resisted encroachment on the preserve since it was created with voters reaffirming their desire to keep it intact on several occasions. In 1990 voters passed Measure J adopting an initiative freezing all county zoning changes until the year 2020 unless there is a two-thirds majority vote to adopt such changes. Measure J was reaffirmed by a 5–2 vote of the California Supreme Court in 1995 in the case of Devita v. County of Napa.

The Land Trust of Napa County was founded in 1976 by a group of local citizens with a mission to protect the natural diversity, scenic open space and agricultural vitality of the county. The trust acquires conservation easements, facilitates land transfers to local, state and federal agencies along with accepting outright donations of land within and outside the boundary of the agricultural preserve. The trust now covers over 50,000 acres (202.3 km^{2}).

While establishment of the agricultural preserve and the land trust has slowed residential development in much of the county, residential growth within the incorporated cities has continued at a moderate pace. Several substantial homes have been built on the hills surrounding the valley in areas not covered by the preserve or the land trust. A large portion of the land south of the City of Napa remained undeveloped for many decades until the 1980s. Several wine bottling facilities and wine storage warehouses now stand on what was once vacant land. A number of light industries have also sprung up in this region as new business parks have been built. The growth of American Canyon, Napa County's southernmost and newest city, incorporated in 1992, has prompted the establishment of several new retail outlets in the southern end of the county in recent years. American Canyon has also established a green belt preserve of over 1,000 acres (4.0 km^{2}) on the western and eastern sides of the city.

In November 2009, the Napa Valley Vintners Association, the Napa Farm Bureau, the Napa Valley Grapegrowers and an advocacy group called Preserving the Integrity of Napa's Agriculture completed a two-year study of Genetically Engineered Organisms (GEOs), and released a joint letter recommending no GEO usage in Napa County until the risks and benefits of GEOs are reevaluated and a "satisfactory" regulatory framework is put in place.

== Education ==
In addition to its many public and private schools, two colleges also operate in the county. Pacific Union College, classified as a National Liberal Arts College by the Carnegie Foundation, is the county's only four-year college and serves roughly 1,500 students. Napa Valley College, a community college, offers two-year degrees in the county.

=== K-12 schools ===
K-12 school districts include:

Unified:

- Calistoga Joint Unified School District
- Fairfield-Suisun Unified School District
- Napa Valley Unified School District
- St. Helena Unified School District

Elementary:

- Howell Mountain Elementary School District
- Pope Valley Union Elementary School District

=== Library ===
The Napa County Library, is the public library of Napa California. The main branch is in downtown Napa. There are three branch libraries, in American Canyon, Calistoga and Yountville.

Napa County Library is a member of LINK+, a union catalog of contributed holdings from participating libraries in California and Nevada.

== Media ==
Napa County receives media from the rest of the Bay Area.

The county also has several media outlets that serve the local community:

- Napa Valley Register
- St. Helena Star
- Weekly Calistogan
- American Canyon Eagle
- Calistoga Tribune
- Yountville Sun
- Napa Valley Life
- KVON 1440 kHz AM
- K245DK translating KVON 96.9 MHz in early 2019
- KVYN 99.3 MHz FM
- K278AH 103.5 MHz in Calistoga
- KCMU-LP FM 103.3 MHz

== Transportation ==
=== Major highways ===
- I-80
- SR 12
- SR 29
- SR 121
- SR 128
- SR 221

=== Public transportation ===
Vine Transit operates local bus service in Napa, along with intercity routes that serve along State Route 29 between Vallejo (Solano County) and Calistoga, and State Route 12/I-80 to Fairfield and Suisun City, along with an Express route to El Cerrito Del Norte BART (WEEKDAYS ONLY) also another WEEKDAY ONLY Express route to Suisun City Amtrak. All routes within city of Napa only operate Monday to Saturday and regional routes operate everyday but all routes DO NOT operate on holidays.

=== Airports ===
- Napa County Airport is a general aviation airport south of the City of Napa.
- Angwin-Parrett Field is a public use airport east of Angwin and is owned by Pacific Union College.

=== Rail ===
The Napa Valley Railroad is owned by the Napa Valley Wine Train, a dining/excursion service. The Napa Wine train offers a variety of different experience packages some including: wine tasting including dinner, rides with Santa during Christmas time, special offers showcasing some of the valley's new releases. Customer will be seated in the 100 year old vintage train while they take a 36-mile round trip from Napa to St. Helena and back.

== Events ==
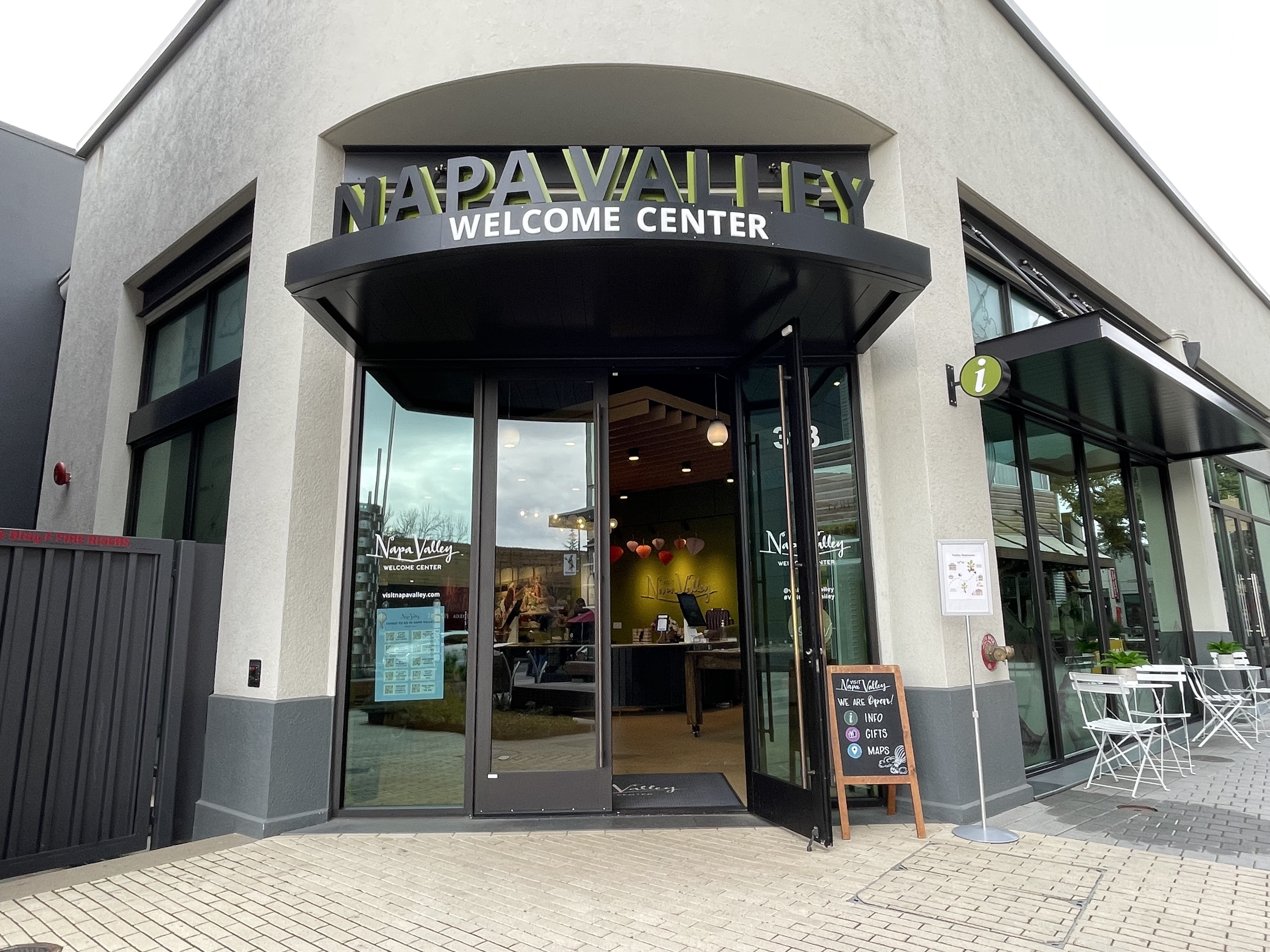
Napa Valley Welcome Center in downtown Napa

Napa County hosts numerous cultural events throughout the year. The county fair takes place annually in early July at the Napa County Fairgrounds in Calistoga. The Napa Town and Country Fair takes place in mid-July at the Napa Valley Expo in Napa. In order to boost tourism during the normally slow winter months, area hotels, restaurants, tourist-based businesses partnered with the county's local arts agency Arts Council Napa Valley and visitor management bureau Visit Napa Valley to develop Arts in April], a program celebrating the diverse cultural offerings featured in wine and hospitality institutions, beginning in 2011. In March every year since the late '70s, the county plays host to the Napa Valley Marathon.

In June, the annual Napa Valley Wine Auction takes place. Wineries throughout the valley donate wines and other prizes to be auctioned off to the highest bidder. This annual event raises several million dollars per year, benefiting charities throughout Napa County.

=== Festival Napa Valley ===
In 2006, Napa Valley became home to the Festival Napa Valley, an annual food, wine, art, and music festival held at various venues throughout the valley. Additional music festivals, including Music in the Vineyards, Live in the Vineyard, the Robert Mondavi Summer Concert Series, all taking place annually in locations throughout the valley.

=== Napa Valley Film Festival ===
The Napa Valley Film Festival was founded in 2011 to recognize independent filmmaking of different genres. The festival occurs in November at various venues.

=== BottleRock Napa Valley ===
BottleRock Napa Valley is a music festival that took place for the first time in May 2013 on the grounds of the Napa Valley Exposition in Napa. The five-day festival featured over 60 bands and participation by over 300 wineries. Although deemed an artistic success, the organizers of the 2013 event left many unpaid creditors. A three-day event was held the following year, and every year since (excluding during COVID) on Memorial Day weekend, and features over 40 musical acts.

A year-round arts and cultural resource for the county, Napa Valley Now, is presented by Arts Council Napa Valley. It is free for the public to use and contribute to and features all major happenings throughout the Valley.

== Communities ==
=== Cities ===
- American Canyon
- Calistoga
- Napa (county seat)
- St. Helena
- Yountville

=== Census-designated places ===
- Angwin
- Deer Park
- Moskowite Corner
- Oakville
- Rutherford
- Silverado Resort

=== Other unincorporated communities ===
- Aetna Springs
- Berryessa Highlands
- Circle Oaks
- Lokoya
- Pope Valley
- Vichy Springs

=== Population ranking ===
The population ranking of the following table is based on the 2020 census of Napa County.

† county seat

Rank	City/Town/etc.	Municipal type	Population (2020 census)
1	† Napa	City	79,246
2	American Canyon	City	21,837
3	St. Helena	City	5,430
4	Calistoga	City	5,228
5	Yountville	City	3,436
6	Angwin	CDP	2,633
7	Deer Park	CDP	1,294
8	Silverado Resort	CDP	948
9	Moskowite Corner	CDP	237
10	Rutherford	CDP	115
11	Oakville	CDP	49

== In popular culture ==
- Bottle Shock (2008) is based on the true story of the famous 1976 "Judgment of Paris," an important event in the history of Napa Valley winemaking.
- The setting for the 1995 movie A Walk in the Clouds is Napa Valley in 1945.
- In the 1998 remake of The Parent Trap, the girls' father was portrayed as a Napa Valley winemaker.
  - The Napa Valley Film Commission lists other films with a setting in Napa or with film shot in Napa County.
- Ursula K. Le Guin's book Always Coming Home is a fictional anthropological dossier about a future, post-societal collapse Indigenous people living in the Napa Valley, which they call the Valley of the Na.

== Notable residents ==
- Michael Chiarello, chef
- Francis Ford Coppola, director
- Margaret Keane, artist
- Thomas Keller, chef
- Robert Mondavi, winemaker
- Gustave Niebaum, winemaker
- Warren Winiarski, winemaker and grape grower
- Robin Williams, actor

== See also ==
- Pacific Union College
- Eriophyllum latilobum
- Lasthenia conjugens
- List of school districts in California by county
- Napa County Airport
- National Register of Historic Places listings in Napa County, California
