= Mare Island Strait =

Strait in California

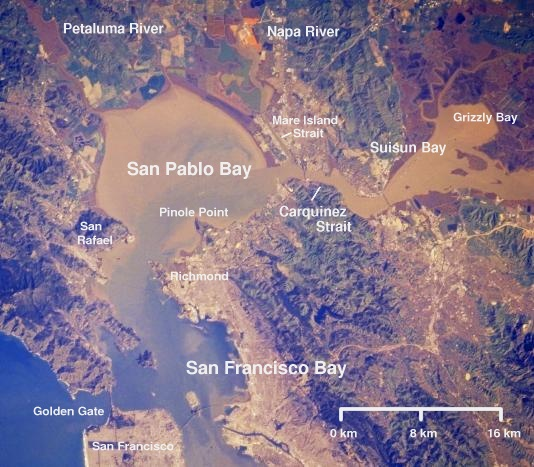
The strait noted on a satellite image of the northern San Pablo Bay portion of the San Francisco Bay.

The Mare Island Strait is a channel at 38.10°N 122.265°W in the San Pablo Bay separating Mare Island and the mainland in Vallejo, California in Solano County. The strait was formerly used by the Mare Island Naval Shipyard until its closure in 1995. The strait is the mouth of the Napa River and is used for both recreational and freight boating. The Vallejo Ferry Terminal and its commuter ferry service to San Francisco are located on the strait.
