= Silverado Resort, California =

Silverado Resort
- Unincorporated community Census designated place
- Position in California.
- Coordinates: 38°21′13.1″N 122°15′19.9″W
- Country: United States
- State: California
- County: Napa
- Named for: Silverado Resort and Spa

Area
  - Total: 1.892 sq mi (4.90 km^{2})
  - Land: 1.891 sq mi (4.90 km^{2})
  - Water: 0.001 sq mi (0.0026 km^{2})
- Elevation: 200 ft (61 m)
- Time zone: UTC-8 (Pacific (PST))
  - Summer (DST): UTC-7 (PDT)
- FIPS code: 0671927
- GNIS feature ID: 2583142

Silverado Resort is an Unincorporated community#United States and census designated place (CDP) in Napa County, California, United States. It includes the Silverado Resort and Spa and the surrounding residential areas. The area is an unincorporated area north of the City of Napa. Per the 2020 census, the population was 948.

== Geography ==
According to the United States Census Bureau, the CDP covers an area of 1.9 square miles (4.9 km^{2}), of which 99.99% is land and 0.01% is water.

== Demographics ==
Historical population
| Census | Pop. | Note | %± |
|---|---|---|---|
| 2010 | 1,095 | | — |
| 2020 | 948 | | −13.4% |
U.S. Decennial Census; 1860–1870 1880-1890; 1900 1910 1920; 1930 1940 1950; 1960 1970 1980; 1990 2000 2010

Silverado Resort first appeared as a census designated place in the 2010 U.S. census.

=== 2020 census ===
Silverado Resort CDP, California – Racial and ethnic composition Note: the US Census treats Hispanic/Latino as an ethnic category. This table excludes Latinos from the racial categories and assigns them to a separate category. Hispanics/Latinos may be of any race.
| Race / Ethnicity (NH = Non-Hispanic) | Pop 2010 | Pop 2020 | % 2010 | % 2020 |
|---|---|---|---|---|
| White alone (NH) | 982 | 808 | 89.68% | 85.23% |
| Black or African American alone (NH) | 1 | 2 | 0.09% | 0.21% |
| Native American or Alaska Native alone (NH) | 1 | 0 | 0.09% | 0.00% |
| Asian alone (NH) | 36 | 30 | 3.29% | 3.16% |
| Native Hawaiian or Pacific Islander alone (NH) | 4 | 2 | 0.37% | 0.21% |
| Other race alone (NH) | 0 | 6 | 0.00% | 0.63% |
| Mixed race or Multiracial (NH) | 12 | 36 | 1.10% | 3.80% |
| Hispanic or Latino (any race) | 59 | 64 | 5.39% | 6.75% |
| Total | 1,095 | 948 | 100.00% | 100.00% |
