= Rancho Yajome =

Mexican land grant

Coordinates: 38.350°N 122.260°W

Rancho Yajome was a 6,654-acre (26.93 km^{2}) Mexican land grant in present day Napa County, California given in 1841 by Governor Juan Alvarado to Damaso Rodríguez, a soldier who did not occupy the property. The rancho is east of the Napa River and north of Napa.

== History ==
The one and a half leagues were granted to Damaso Antonio Rodríguez (1782 - 1847). Rodriguez was a corporal of the Monterey Company, and transferred to the Santa Barbara Company in 1818. From 1833 he was alferez of the San Francisco Company, and sometimes commander of the post. While officially being an invalid, he was at Sonoma from 1837 in the service of General Mariano Guadalupe Vallejo. Rodriguez was involved in the 1846 Battle of Olompali and died soon after. The property was not occupied and Salvador Vallejo, brother of General Vallejo, applied for the property.

With the cession of California to the United States following the Mexican-American War, the 1848 Treaty of Guadalupe Hidalgo provided that the land grants would be honored. As required by the Land Act of 1851, a claim for Rancho Yajome was filed with the Public Land Commission in 1852, and the grant was patented to Salvador Vallejo in 1864.

The Silverado Country Club is located on 1,200 acres (4.9 km^{2}) of the rancho acquired by General John Franklin Miller in 1869, 1873 and 1881.

== See also ==
- Ranchos of California
- List of Ranchos of California
