= Napa River =

River in California, United States

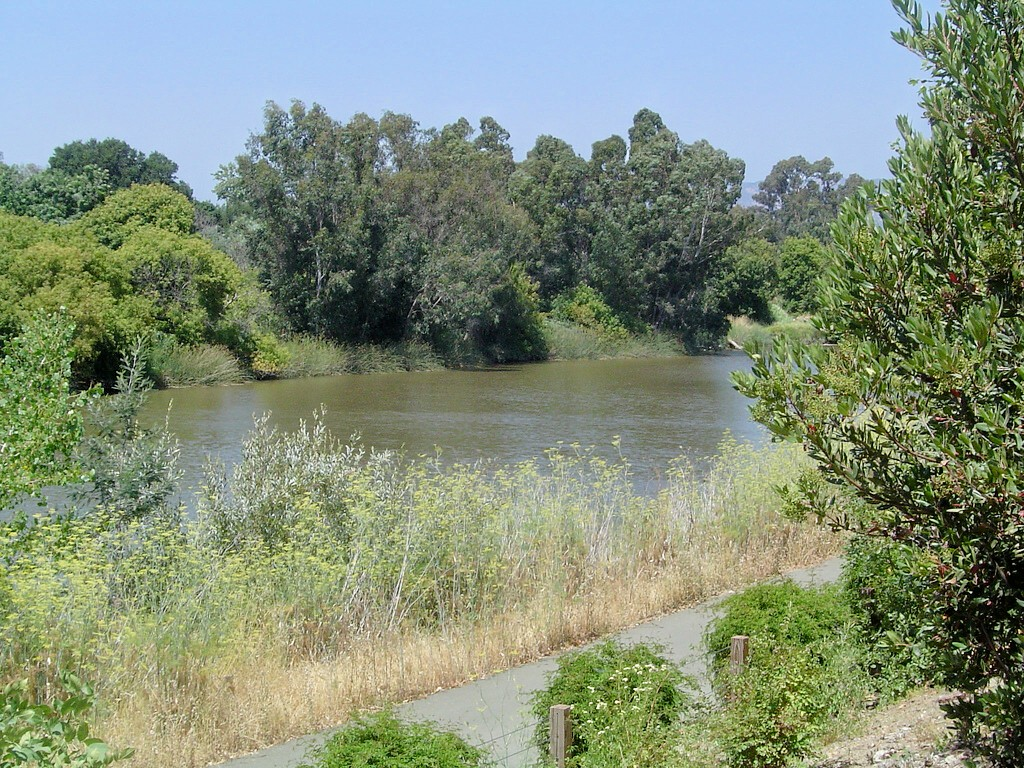
- The Napa River in Napa, as viewed from Copia

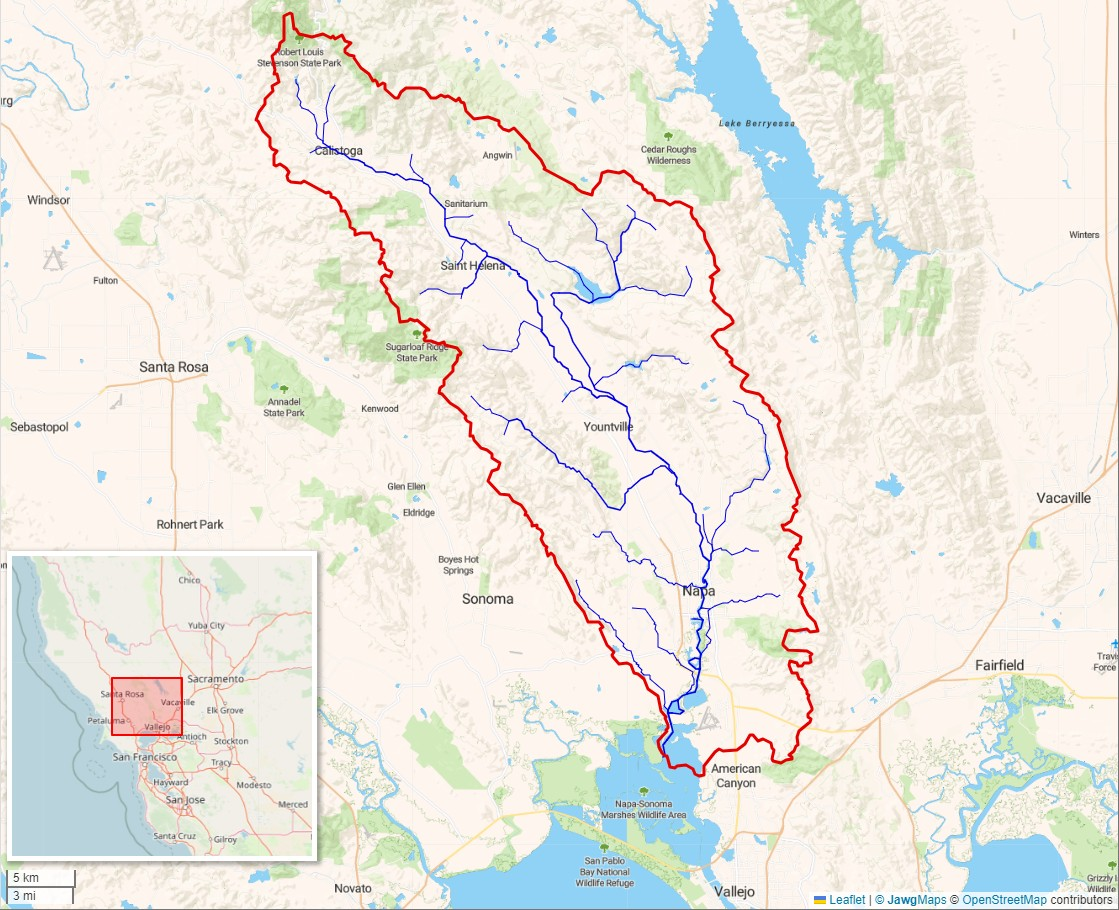
- Napa River watershed (Interactive map)

Location
- Country: United States
- State: California
- Region: Napa County, Solano County
- City: Napa

Physical characteristics
- Source: Mount Saint Helena
  - location: Mayacamas Mountains
  - coordinates: 38°39′52″N 122°37′14″W
  - elevation: 3,745 ft (1,141 m)
- Mouth: Carquinez Strait
  - location: San Pablo Bay
  - coordinates: 38°4′12″N 122°14′38″W
  - elevation: 0 ft (0 m)
- Length: 55 mi (89 km)
- Basin size: 426 sq mi (1,100 km^{2})
- Discharge
  - average: 210 cu ft/s (5.9 m^{3}/s)
  - minimum: 0 cu ft/s (0 m^{3}/s)
  - maximum: 26,200 cu ft/s (740 m^{3}/s)

Basin features
- Tributaries
  - left: Conn Creek, Rector Creek, Soda Creek, Milliken Creek, Suscol Creek
  - right: Dry Creek, Napa Creek, Carneros Creek

The Napa River is a river approximately 55 miles (89 km) long in the U.S. state of California. It drains a famous wine-growing region called the Napa Valley, in the mountains north of the San Francisco Bay. Milliken Creek and Mt. Veeder watersheds are a few of its many tributaries. The river mouth is at Vallejo, where the intertidal zone of fresh and salt waters flow into the Carquinez Strait and the San Pablo Bay.

== Course ==
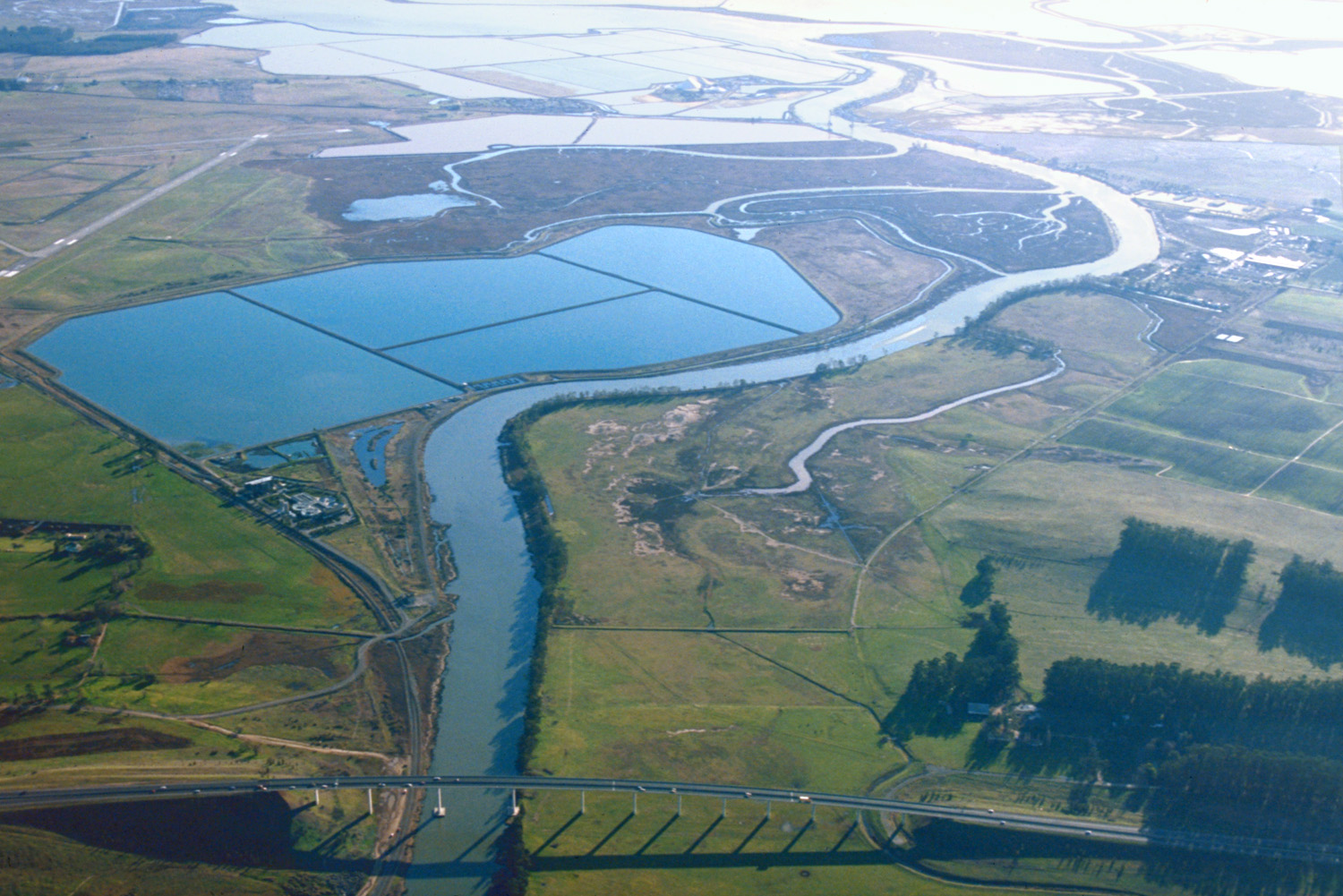
Aerial view of the southern end of the Napa River in the Napa–Sonoma Marsh

The Napa River rises in northwestern Napa County just south of the summit of Mt. St. Helena in the Mayacamas Mountains of the California Coast Ranges. The source begins as seasonal Kimball Canyon Creek in Robert Louis Stevenson State Park at an elevation of 3,745 feet (1,141 m) which descends the southern slope of Mt. St. Helena to Kimball Canyon Dam. It flows south for 4 miles (6 km), entering the head of the slender Napa Valley north of Calistoga. In the valley, it flows southeast past Calistoga, St Helena, Rutherford, Oakville and through Napa, its head of navigation. Downstream from Napa, it forms a tidal estuary, entering Mare Island Strait, a narrow channel on the north end of San Pablo Bay. It discharges into San Pablo Bay through the Napa Sonoma Marsh.

== Watershed ==
The Napa River watershed encompasses approximately 426 square miles (1,103 km^{2}). Larger tributaries, such as Dry, Conn, and Soda creeks, show signs of recent incision and have graded to the incised current level of the mainstem Napa River. In some cases, smaller tributaries cutting across the valley floor have not fully adjusted to the lowered level of the mainstem and are elevated at their confluence with the mainstem, forming potential barriers to upstream fish migration. Several large dams were built between 1924 and 1959 on major eastside tributaries (Conn, Rector, Milliken, and Bell dams) and the northern headwaters of the Napa River (Kimball Dam). In addition, many smaller dams can be found throughout the watershed. These numerous dams are impassable barriers to salmon and steelhead seeking their historic spawning grounds.

== Ecology ==
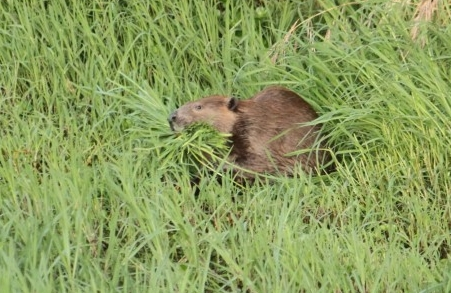
May 2014 photo of beaver gathering shore grasses on the Napa River

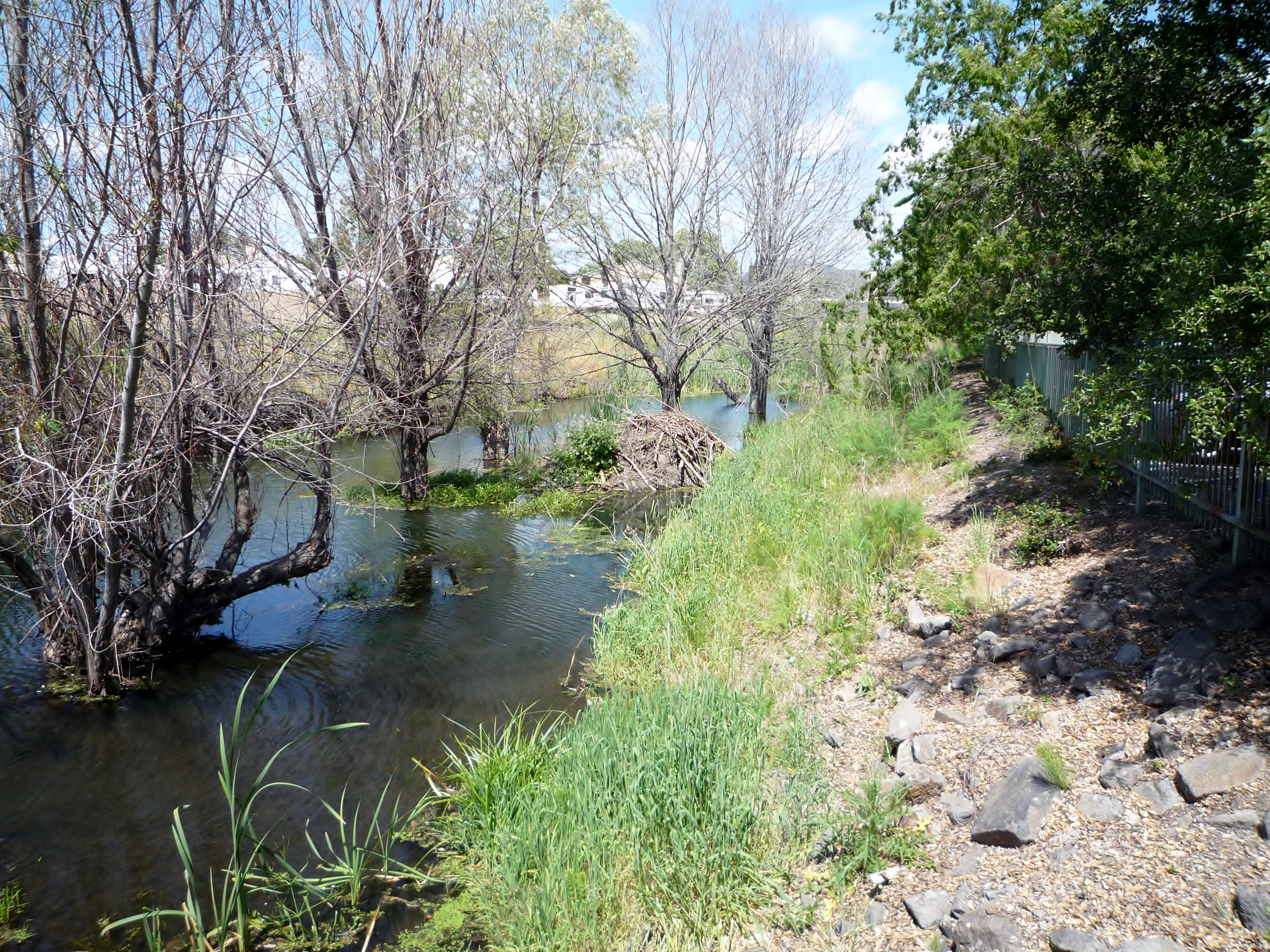
Beaver Lodge on Tulucay Creek at Soscol Avenue in downtown Napa

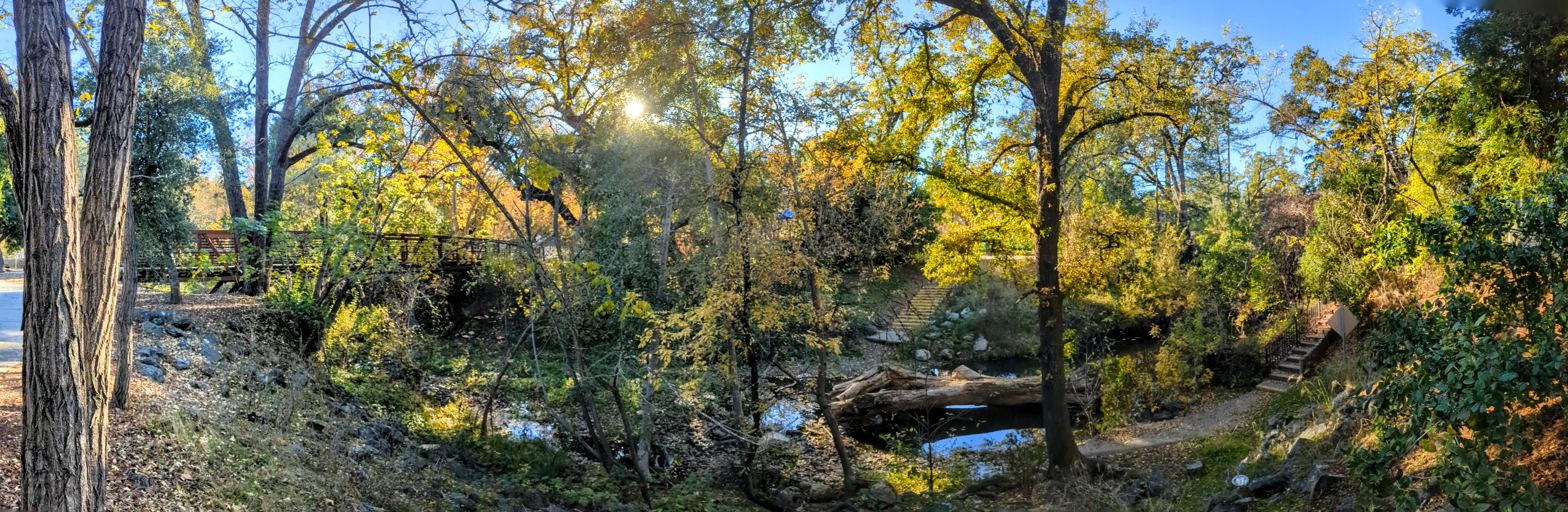
The Napa River running through Pioneer Park in Calistoga

The river also supports a remarkable diversity of fishes and recovering salmonid populations, especially chinook salmon (Oncorhynchus tshawytscha) and steelhead trout (Oncorhynchus mykiss). In 2003 the Napa County Resource Conservation District began an ongoing salmon monitoring program, and have recorded a run of approximately 400 - 1000 fall-run Chinook salmon the past several years. The Chinook run begins in late October through January. Conclusive evidence of historical chinook salmon populations in the Napa River basin have not been established, but the river provides appropriate habitat for salmon and its location near the entrance to the Sacramento/San Joaquin Rivers make it likely that salmon would have at least ventured into the Napa River. In 2013, a genetics study of Napa River chinook salmon revealed that two adults migrated from the Klamath River and successfully spawned in the Napa River, since four juvenile chinook collected from the Napa River in 2010 were proved to be siblings from the close similarity of their DNA and that the latter was characteristic of Klamath River chinook. These findings have important implications for the protection of the federally endangered Coastal California Chinook Salmon ESU since the Napa River, nor any stream in the Bay Area, was included in this ESU.

The Napa River basin is estimated to have historically supported a spawning run of 6,000–8,000 steelhead, and as many as 2,000–4,000 coho salmon (Oncorhynchus kisutch). By the late 1960s, coho salmon were extirpated from the watershed and the steelhead population is now reduced to less than a few hundred adults. Flow reductions in key rearing streams have reduced food availability for juvenile steelhead, causing reduced growth and survival. Recently, a chum salmon (Oncorhynchus keta) was caught in the river. In addition, a fourth salmon species, sockeye salmon (Oncorhynchus nerka), was also identified in the Napa River.

Although diminished, the Napa River basin continues to support a fish community of greater diversity than even the Sacramento and San Joaquin River systems, including a nearly intact community of sixteen native fish species, including Steelhead, fall-run Chinook salmon, Pacific (Lampetra tridentata) and river lamprey (Lampetra ayresi), hardhead (Mylopharodon conocephalus), hitch (Lavinia exilicauda), tule perch (Hysterocarpus traski), and Sacramento splittail (Pogonichthys macrolepidotus). Because of this diversity the Napa River has been prioritized for special protection. White sturgeon (Acipenser transmontanus) and many other native and non-native fishes currently use the Napa River watershed.

The California golden beaver (Castor canadensis subauraticus) was historically extant. Recently beaver have recolonized the Napa River and have been documented in Napa as well as near Rutherford and Oak Knoll.

== Restoration ==
As part of urban renewal in the 1970s, a concrete cover was removed from culverted sections of the Napa Creek, re-exposing the water to daylight. There is some debate as to whether this constituted one of the country's earliest "daylighting" projects, since the construction was undertaken with little thought to the river's ecology or restoration of riparian habitat. This construction is not believed to be responsible for later flooding along the river.

More recently, vineyard owners with property that borders the Rutherford Reach, a 4.5-mile (7.2 km) stretch of the Napa River between St. Helena and Oakville, are allowing prime land to return to a natural state in order to help preserve the ecology of the river. The project known as Rutherford Restoration Project involves 23 property owners have combined forces to provide 18 acres (73,000 m^{2}) of land to this cause. After the restoration, native North American beaver returned to the area, establishing 3–4 beaver dams. These keystone species have been shown to increase fish, bird and mammal abundance and diversity in California rivers and streams. They also benefit trout and salmon by reducing sediment loads and improve water quality. The southern part of the river has also been undergoing restoration as former salt ponds along the river are being restored to their natural state.

== Napa flood of 1986 ==
In 1986, the worst of 23 floods recorded since 1865 on the Napa River occurred. 5,000 people were evacuated, 250 homes were destroyed, and three people lost their lives.

After the devastating flood of 1986, the dormant Napa River Flood Project was revitalized. The Project underwent a lengthy redesign and was approved by the local voters in 1998. Construction began in 2000 and was completed by 2015.

== Recreation ==
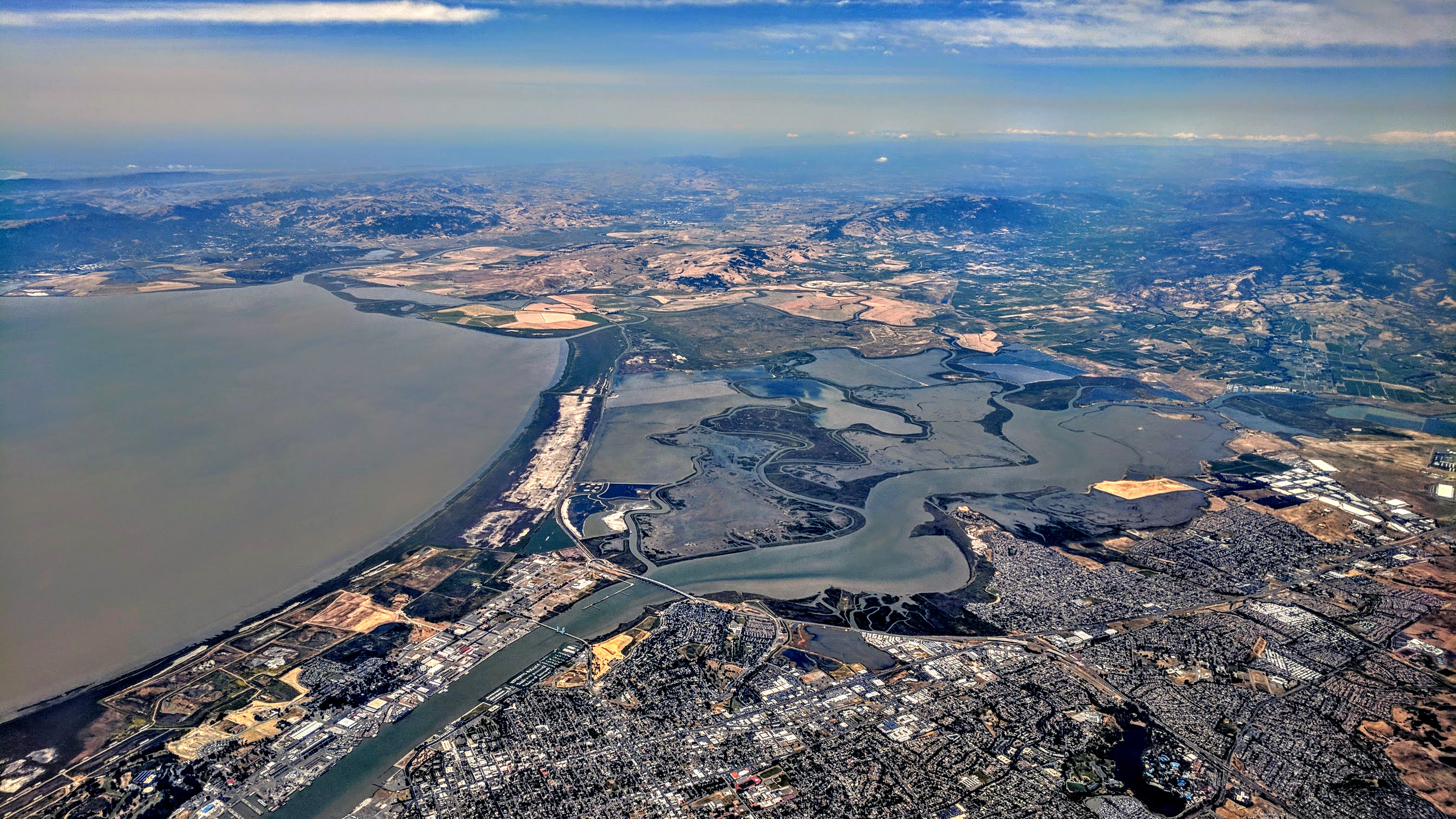
Aerial view of the flatwater section of the Napa River where it divides Vallejo, California

The Napa River and the surrounding watershed provide many recreational opportunities. Whitewater kayaking and rafting can be done on the upper section of river from St. Helena to Napa. The lower section of the Napa River from Napa to San Pablo Bay has flatwater that is suitable for canoeing, sea kayaking, motorboating, as well as an Italian-style gondola cruise. The Napa River Trail has segments at Kennedy Park (N 38.26764 W 122.28373) & between Lincoln Ave (N 38.31055 W 122.27783) and Trancas St (N 38.32496 W 122.28384) in the city of Napa.

== See also ==
- List of rivers of California
- List of watercourses in the San Francisco Bay Area
