= Vichy Springs, Mendocino County, California =

Unincorporated community in California, United States

Vichy Springs
- Unincorporated community
- Location in California Vichy Springs (the United States)
- Coordinates: 39°10′01″N 123°09′29″W
- Country: United States
- State: California
- County: Mendocino County
- Elevation: 801 ft (244 m)

California Historical Landmark
- Reference no.: 980

Vichy Springs (formerly, Ukiah Vichy Springs and Doolan's Ukiah Vichy Springs) is a set of springs around which formed a resort in Mendocino County, California, United States. It is located on Sulphur Creek 3 miles (4.8 km) east-northeast of Ukiah, at an elevation of 801 feet (244 m).

Although previously used by the local Native Americans, the first westerner to discover the hot springs at this location was Frank Marble, in 1848. The springs at Ukiah Vichy resemble the more famous Grand Grille Springs in Vichy, and like the springs in Vichy the waters of the springs are alkaline and carbonated. In the 1850s William Day founded the Ukiah Vichy Springs Resort, taking advantage of the 19th-century revival of hydrotherapy. By 1892 the resort was known as Doolan's Ukiah Vichy Springs. Visitors included Ulysses S. Grant, Benjamin Harrison, Jack London, Teddy Roosevelt, Robert Louis Stevenson, and Mark Twain. As one of the oldest continuously operated hot spring resorts in the state, Ukiah Vichy Springs has been recognized as California Historical Landmark #980.

A post office operated at Vichy Springs from 1893 to 1936.
