= Jonathan Quinn Barnett =

- Born: 1964 (age 61–62)
- Occupation: Super Yacht Designer
- Known for: Octopus
- Parent(s): Judith Quinn and Neil Barnett

Jonathan Quinn Barnett (born 1964) is an American super yacht designer from Seattle, Washington. He apprenticed with Ron Holland and Jon Bannenberg for nearly seven years beginning in 1987, and founded Jonathan Quinn Barnett Ltd. (JQB Ltd.) in 1995.

Barnett designed the interior of the 414-foot yacht Octopus in 2003; the interior of MV Kirkland in 1996; and the interior and exterior of Caterpillar Financial–funded super yacht Monarch in 2011.

== Biography ==
Barnett was born in 1964 to Judith Quinn and Neil Barnett, a portraitist mother and engineer father, who were linked to his "creative curiosity" in an interview. He obtained his degree in industrial design at the University of Cincinnati, completing a thesis on yacht design after originally focusing on automobile design. He worked with Tom Tjaarda (designer of the De Tomaso Pantera) at Dimensione Design in Italy (1985–1986), and then worked with Industrial Light & Magic, modeling Klingon ships for Star Trek IV: The Voyage Home.

He worked with designer Ron Holland for three months (1986–1987), which led to Barnett's apprenticeship with Jon Bannenberg for nearly seven years beginning in 1987. Barnett later said of his style that, in his career, "if there was one man who influenced me most, it would certainly have to be the late Jon Bannenberg."

He then moved to Belltown, Seattle, in the Pacific Northwest, where he founded Jonathan Quinn Barnett Ltd. in 1995. His brother Chris Barnett serves as general manager. He has designed exteriors and interiors for yachts of sizes from 50' to 400' and provides related design services.

His firm also performs residential projects such as private home and condominium design. The firm provided designs, decor, and project management services for the exterior and interior restoration of the main residence of the 1890s Victorian Rubicon Estate Winery (now Inglenook) in 2003 for Francis Ford Coppola.

== Octopus ==
The Octopus, the largest private yacht in the world when launched, was built under strict conditions of nondisclosure. Through local ties to the Paul Allen–founded Vulcan Inc., Jonathan Quinn Barnett Ltd. designed the interior of the 414-foot Octopus in 2003.

With a submarine, a tender, a dual helicopter hangar with two helipads, nine decks, and accommodations for 60 crew and staff, it is frequently at sea and only occasionally at its homeport in Antibes, France. Barnett also performed the 2014 interior refit of the Octopus at Blohm & Voss Repair in Germany.

== Other yachts ==
The 122' Qué Sera (2005) was heralded for "one of the finest interiors to come from [Delta Marine,] featuring light airy spaces accentuated with exquisite woods, and a new elegant and contemporary decor by Jonathan Q. Barnett."

Northern Marine (Anacortes, Washington) announced plans to launch a 151' Barnett trideck in 2006, built of fiberglass composites shaped by vacuum infusion, and featuring an Old World–style makore satin finish interior. This conventional motoryacht, with a 30' master suite and four guest staterooms, was displayed at the October 2006 Ft. Lauderdale International Boat Show. Northern Marine then launched the 151' Bella Bri in 2008, designed by Barnett with naval architecture by George Roddan. The Bella Bri reaches 21 knots and includes a paneled formal dining room in addition to its owner and guest suites, offices, and crew rooms.

Yachts designed by Barnett include:

Ron Holland Design

- Sensation, 33.77m, interior design collaborator (1987, Sensation Yachts)

Bannenberg Designs

- Coral Island, 72.54m, interior design lead (1994, Lürssen Yachts)
- Limitless, 96.25m, interior design collaborator (1997, Lürssen Yachts)

JQB, Ltd.

- MV Kirkland, 110', exterior and interior design (1924, 1996 refit)
- Sensei, 127', exterior and interior design (1991, refit, Mitsubishi Heavy Industries)
- Ste. Jill (Bolero), 124', exterior and interior design (1997, Delta Marine)
- Golden Boy II, 114', interior design (1998, Sovereign Yachts)
- Lady Rita, 114', interior design (1998, Northcoast Yachts)
- Scott Free, 120', interior design (2000, Northcoast Yachts)
- Aerie (Spirit), 124', exterior and interior design (2001, Delta Marine), winner of the 2002 ShowBoats Design Award for Best Semidisplacement Motoryacht Under 38 Meters
- Rainbow Rose, 102', interior design (2001, Little Hoquiam Shipyard)
- C1, 95', interior design (2003, Bloemsma & van Breemen)
- Octopus, 414', interior design (2003, 2014 refit, Lürssen Yachts)
- Cerulean trideck series, 48'–160', interior design (2005, Northern Marine)
- Qué Sera, 122', interior design (2005, Delta Marine)
- After Eight, 151', exterior and interior design (2007, Northern Marine)
- Silver Shalis, 180', interior design (2008, Delta Marine)
- Bella Bri (Freedom), 151' trideck, exterior and interior design (2008, Northern Marine)
- Crescent 144 series, 144', interior design (2010, Crescent Yachts)
- Monarch (Just J's), 151', exterior and interior design (2011, Delta Marine)

Project Monarch won the 2011 Northwest Design Award for Exotic Retreats, sponsored by Seattle Design Center.
