= Scarecrow (wine) =

California wine producer

Coordinates: 38.4644°N 122.4228°W

- Location: Rutherford, California, United States
- Appellation: Rutherford AVA
- Formerly: J. J. Cohn Estate
- Founded: 1945
- First vintage: 2003
- Key people: Bret Lopez (owner); Celia Welch (winemaker); Michael L. Wolf (vineyard manager)
- Cases/yr: 400
- Known for: Scarecrow
- Varietal: Toto's Opium Dream Scene 4 (Cabernet Sauvignon)
- Distribution: Mailing list only
- Tasting: Invitation only
- Website: www.scarecrowwine.com

Scarecrow, historically the J.J. Cohn Estate, is a California wine producer. The estate is located in Rutherford, CA, within the Rutherford AVA in the Napa Valley AVA zone.

== History ==
In 1943, Joseph Judson Cohn, an MGM executive producer of films such as The Wizard of Oz acquired the 195-acre (79 ha) property of Rutherford land adjacent to Inglenook Winery founded by Gustave Niebaum. In 1945 he was persuaded by his neighbor in charge of Inglenook since 1939, John Daniel Jr., to plant grape vines on his estate. 80 acres (32 ha) were planted with Cabernet Sauvignon, and the fruit from the Cohn estate was sold to Inglenook.

In later years, the fruit from the J.J. Cohn Estate was sold to Opus One, Joseph Phelps Vineyards, Robert Mondavi Winery and Beaulieu Vineyard. In 1990s, a vine pest Phylloxera led to most Napa vineyards being replanted, but the root stock at Scarecrow's fields survived. Cohn died in 1996 aged 100, and the heirs put the then 85-acre (34 ha) property up for sale to resolve the inheritance dispute, and a value estimation at $4 million in 1996 rose to $33.6 million by 2002, when Francis Ford Coppola of the Rubicon Estate Winery eventually purchased the property in a package deal with Cohn's grandson Bret Lopez. Coppola got ca. 140 acres (57 ha) including most of the vineyard with 60 planted acres (240,000 m^{2}), while Lopez and his partner Mimi DeBlasio received the property buildings, 25 acres of partially planted vineyards and 2 acres (0.81 ha) of the original 1945 Cabernet vines.

The wine's name was decided upon by Lopez and DeBlasio in honor of Cohn. Following the engagement of winemaker Celia Welch, the debut vintage of 2003 became successful, while later vintages have rapidly established Scarecrow as a cult wine. The winery's second release sold out in 16 hours, and the following year sales were staggered, with repeat customers first on the list. SFGate said in 2008 that Scarecrow had a yearly output of around 400 cases, calling it a cult wine similar to the Screaming Eagle winery. At that time, it remained owned by Bret Lopez and Mimi DeBlasio. It had a mailing list of around 8,000 people, offering around 400 cases of the 2005 vintage that year for $150 a bottle.

At the April 2009 Premiere Napa Valley auction, a lot of five cases of Scarecrow was sold for $80,000. At the February 2011 Premiere Napa Valley auction, a lot of five cases of Scarecrow Wine was sold for $125,000, breaking previous PNV records. The lot was purchased by Ichizo Nakagawa, owner of Tokyo-based Nakagawa Wine Company. In 2017 at the Premiere Napa Valley wine auction hosted by Napa Valley Vintners, five cases of Scarecrow, dubbed Toto's Opium Dream Scene 4, the wine was Cabernet Sauvignon from 72-year-old vines. The lot ultimately sold for $200,000.

In 2019, the wine app Vivino had named the vintage Scarecrow Cabernet Sauvignon 2015 as "the best wine in the world," according to data mining of the "40 million reviews and 120 million ratings its members posted online" in 2018.

== Production ==
The estate extends 25 acres (10 ha) under vine, of 100% Cabernet Sauvignon with 5.5 tons of fruit from the "House block", 2 tons from the "Hillside block" and 1.5 tons from the "Old Men block" planted in 1945.

A range of 400–800 cases (36–72 hl; 950–1,900 US gal) of Scarecrow may be produced annually.

== Business model ==
Mailing list members are given priority, even over celebrity requests. Bottles are sold in resale for much higher prices.

Not open to the public, it at times opens for private visits from customers such as Ellen DeGeneres.
