= Celia Welch =

American winemaker

- Born: 1960 (age 65–66)
- Other name: Celia Masyczek
- Occupation: Winemaker

Celia Welch (born 1960 as Celia Masyczek) is an American winemaker. She is known for developing vintages in Napa Valley for a number of wineries, and the San Francisco Chronicle described her as a member "of an elite order of Napa winemaking consultants." She launched her own label, Corra, in 2004.

== Early life and education ==
Born Celia Masyczek in 1960, Welch grew up in Medford, Oregon. She and her siblings spent their childhoods with a half-acre vineyard in their backyard, and her father was a home winemaker and wine collector. She attended the University of California, Davis, graduating in 1982 after studying viticulture.

== Career ==
=== 1991-2010 ===
She was hired by Shari Staglin of Staglin Family Vineyard as a consulting winemaker in 1991, and was involved in the wine industry in Napa Valley during the small-winery boom that took place in the early 1990s. She made wines for labels such as Barbour, Lindstrom, and Yount Ridge. By 2008, she had also worked for cabernet producers such as DR Stephens, Cornerstone, Scarecrow, Lindstrom, Husic, Calistoga, Carneros, Kelly Fleming, Hollywood & Vine, Stalworth, and Keever Vineyards.

She launched her own label, Corra, in 2004, with a 200-case-production cabernet sauvignon. In 2008, she earned Food and Wine magazine's Winemaker of the Year Award.

=== 2011-2023 ===
The Orange County Register reported in 2019 that Welch was primarily focused on Yount Ridge Cellars, a Napa Valley vineyard near Oakville, California. Welch, who started making wine for its owners in 2006, shared a partnership interest in the company.

In August 2019, she began selling for Corra label in the United Kingdom for the first time, selling through James Hocking Wine. According to Dave McIntyre for the Washington Post, as a consulting winemaker, by 2019 she had "crafted some of Napa’s most touted, and most expensive, cabernets," noting her cabernet vintages for Scarecrow. Earlier that year, the wine app Vivino had named her vintage Scarecrow Cabernet Sauvignon 2015 as "the best wine in the world," according to data mining of the "40 million reviews and 120 million ratings its members posted online" in 2018.

In 2022, the San Francisco Chronicle described her as a member "of an elite order of Napa winemaking consultants" along with Philippe Melka, Mike Smith, Andy Erickson, Aaron Pott, Julien Fayard, Jean Hoeflinger, Sam Kaplan, Tony Biagi and Heidi Barrett.

== See also ==
- List of wine professionals
- List of University of California, Davis alumni
