= T. africana =

T. africana may refer to:

- Tabernaemontana africana, a flowering plant species in the genus Tabernaemontana
- Tieghemella africana, a plant species found in Cameroon, the Republic of the Congo and Gabon
- Tornieria africana, a dinosaur species
- Treculia africana, the African breadfruit, a tree species
- Tricalysia africana, a plant species endemic to South Africa

== See also ==
- Africana (disambiguation)
