= Zachariassen =

Zachariassen is a Scandinavian surname. Notable people with the surname include:

- Aksel Zachariassen (1898–1987), Norwegian politician, newspaper editor, secretary and writer
- Allan Zachariassen (born 1955), Danish long-distance runner
- Anders Zachariassen (born 1991), Danish handball player
- Frida Zachariassen (1912–1992), Faroese painter and writer
- Heini Zachariassen (born 1972), Faroese technology entrepreneur
- Karl Erik Zachariassen (1942–2009), Norwegian entomologist
- Kjetil Zachariassen (born 1968), Norwegian association football coach
- Kristoffer Zachariassen (born 1994), Norwegian footballer
- Rikke Zachariassen (born 1984), Danish handball player
- Rolf Zachariassen (1935–2024), Finnish sailor
- Sverre Zachariassen (1919–2002), Norwegian footballer

== See also ==
- Fredrik Zachariasen (1931–1999), American physicist
- William Houlder Zachariasen (1906–1979), Norwegian-American physicist
