= Limitless (luxury yacht) =

Private superyacht

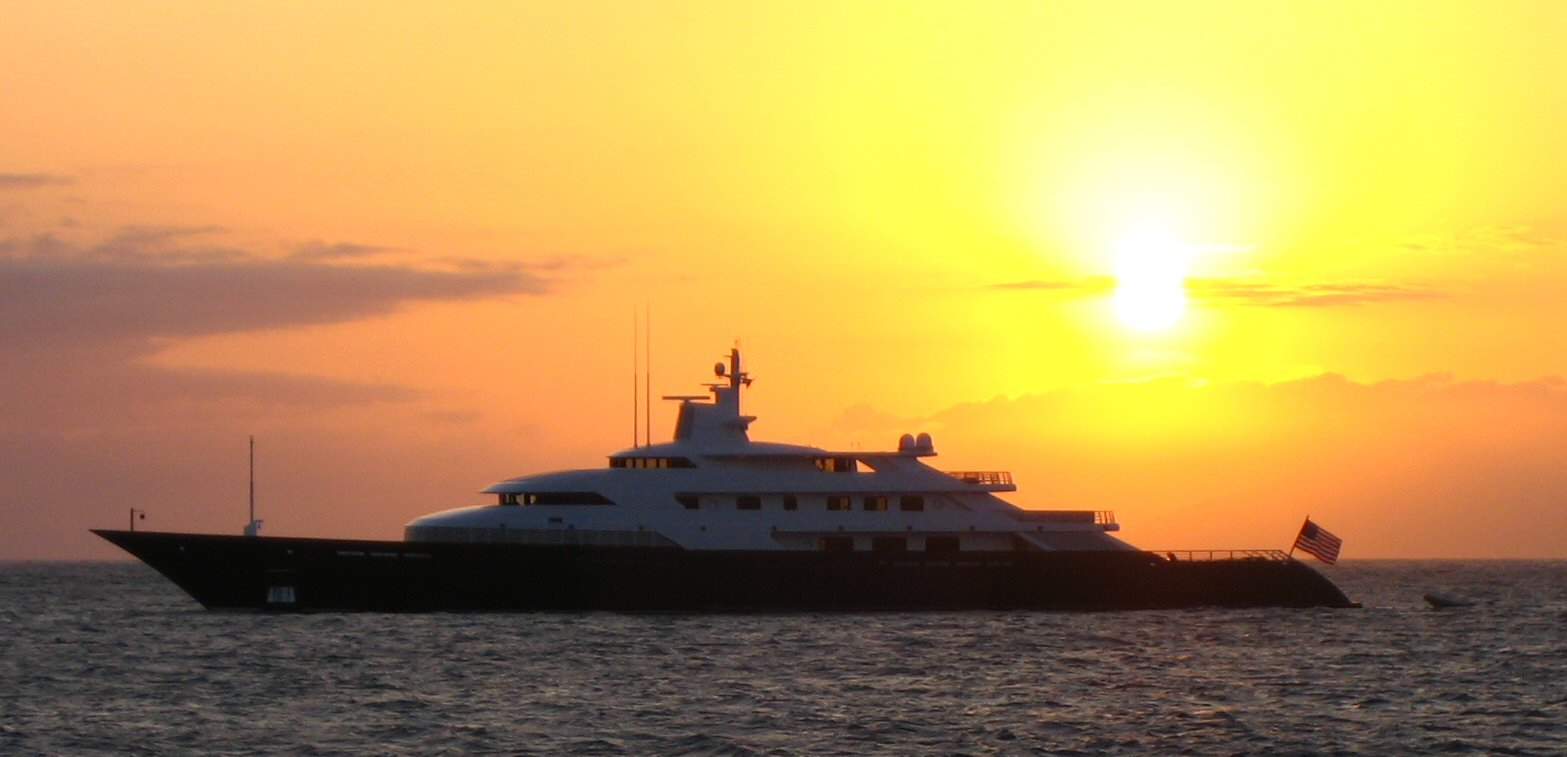
Side view of Limitless (Capri, 2006)

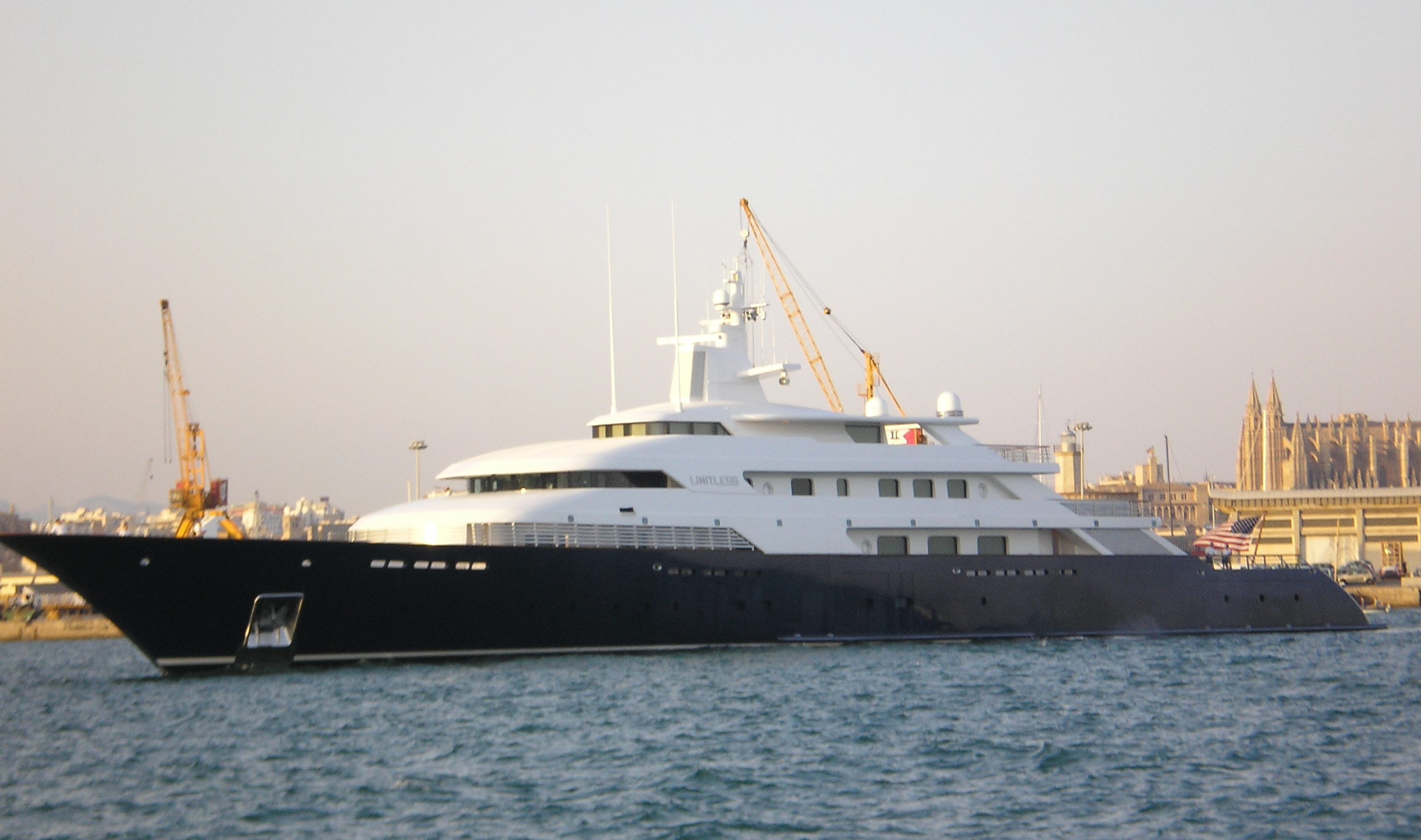
Side view of Limitless (Palma de Mallorca, 2006)

Limitless is one of the world's largest private superyachts. It was built in 1997 by German shipmaker Lürssen, with exterior design by Jon Bannenberg and Jonathan Quinn Barnett, and interior design by François Catroux. The overall length is 96.25 m (315 ft. 8 in.), the width 12.50 m (41 ft.). It is powered by two Caterpillar 3616 engines of 5,420 kW (7,268 hp) each, reaching a speed of 25 knots (46 km/h; 29 mph), and was the first yacht to feature a combination of diesel and diesel-electric propulsion. Limitless is owned by Les Wexner, an American businessman who is currently chairman and former CEO of the L Brands corporation (formerly Limited Brands, and best known for its brand Victoria's Secret).
