= Jonathan Barnett =

Jonathan Barnett may refer to:

- Jonathan Barnet (1677/78 – 1745), privateer active near Jamaica, known for capturing pirate John Rackham
- Jonathan Barnett (sports agent) (born 1950), British football agent
- Jonathan Barnett (politician) (born 1955), member of the Arkansas House of Representatives
- Jonathan Quinn Barnett (born 1964), American super yacht designer
