= Sun Fast 32 =

Sailboat class

Development
- Designer: Philippe Briand
- Location: France
- Year: 1993
- No. built: 100
- Builder: Jeanneau
- Role: Cruiser-Racer
- Name: Sun Fast 32

Boat
- Displacement: 8,488 lb (3,850 kg)
- Draft: 4.76 ft (1.45 m)

Hull
- Type: monohull
- Construction: fiberglass
- LOA: 31.17 ft (9.50 m)
- LWL: 26.41 ft (8.05 m)
- Beam: 10.83 ft (3.30 m)
- Engine: 17 hp (13 kW) diesel engine

Hull appendages
- Keel: fin keel
- Ballast: 2,888 lb (1,310 kg)
- Rudder: spade-type rudder

Rig
- Rig type: Bermuda rig
- I foretriangle height: 38.08 ft (11.61 m)
- J foretriangle base: 10.58 ft (3.22 m)
- P mainsail luff: 37.42 ft (11.41 m)
- E mainsail foot: 11.81 ft (3.60 m)

Sails
- Sailplan: fractional rigged sloop
- Mainsail area: 269 sq ft (25.0 m^{2})
- Jib/genoa area: 306 sq ft (28.4 m^{2})
- Spinnaker area: 657 sq ft (61.0 m^{2})
- Upwind sail area: 575 sq ft (53.4 m^{2})
- Downwind sail area: 926 sq ft (86.0 m^{2})

The Sun Fast 32 is a French sailboat that was designed by Philippe Briand as a cruiser-racer and first built in 1993.

The Sun Fast 32 is part of the Sun Fast sailboat range.

The design was developed into the Sun Odyssey 32.1 cruiser in 1994.

== Production ==
The design was built by Jeanneau in France, from 1993 to 2001 with 100 boats completed, but it is now out of production.

== Design ==
The Sun Fast 32 is a recreational keelboat, built predominantly of fiberglass, with wood trim. It has a fractional sloop rig, with a deck-stepped mast, two sets of swept spreaders and aluminum spars with continuous stainless steel wire rigging. The hull has a raked stem, a reverse transom with steps, an internally mounted spade-type rudder controlled by a tiller and a fixed deep-draft, L-shaped, fin keel or optional shoal-draft keel. The deep draft fin keel model displaces 7,937 lb (3,600 kg) and carries 2,381 lb (1,080 kg) of cast iron ballast, while the shoal draft version displaces 8,488 lb (3,850 kg) and carries 2,888 lb (1,310 kg) of cast iron ballast.

The boat has a draft of 6.4 ft (2.0 m) with the deep draft keel and 4.76 ft (1.45 m) with the optional shoal draft keel.

The boat is fitted with a diesel engine of 9 to 18 hp (7 to 13 kW) for docking and maneuvering. The fuel tank holds 11 U.S. gallons (42 L; 9.2 imp gal) and the fresh water tank has a capacity of 42 U.S. gallons (160 L; 35 imp gal).

The design has sleeping accommodation for six people, with a double "V"-berth in the bow cabin, two straight settees in the main cabin and an aft cabin with a double berth on the port side. The galley is located on the port side just forward of the companionway ladder. The galley is L-shaped and is equipped with a two-burner stove, an ice box and a sink. A navigation station is opposite the galley, on the starboard side. The head is located just aft of the companionway on the starboard side and includes a shower. The interior has a teak sole and varnished makore woodwork. Cabin maximum headroom is 72 in (183 cm).

For sailing downwind the design may be equipped with a symmetrical spinnaker of 657 sq ft (61.0 m^{2}).

The design has a hull speed of 6.89 kn (12.76 km/h).

== Operational history ==
The boat was at one time supported by a class club that organized racing events, the Sun Fast Association.

== See also ==
- List of sailing boat types
