= African cherry =

African cherry may refer to:

- Prunus africana, a tree native to central and southern Africa
- Tieghemella heckelii (syn. Mimusops heckelii), cherry mahogany, a tree native to central Africa

== See also ==
- African cherry orange (Citropis), a genus of flowering plants
- Cherry, the fruit of various trees in the genus Prunus
