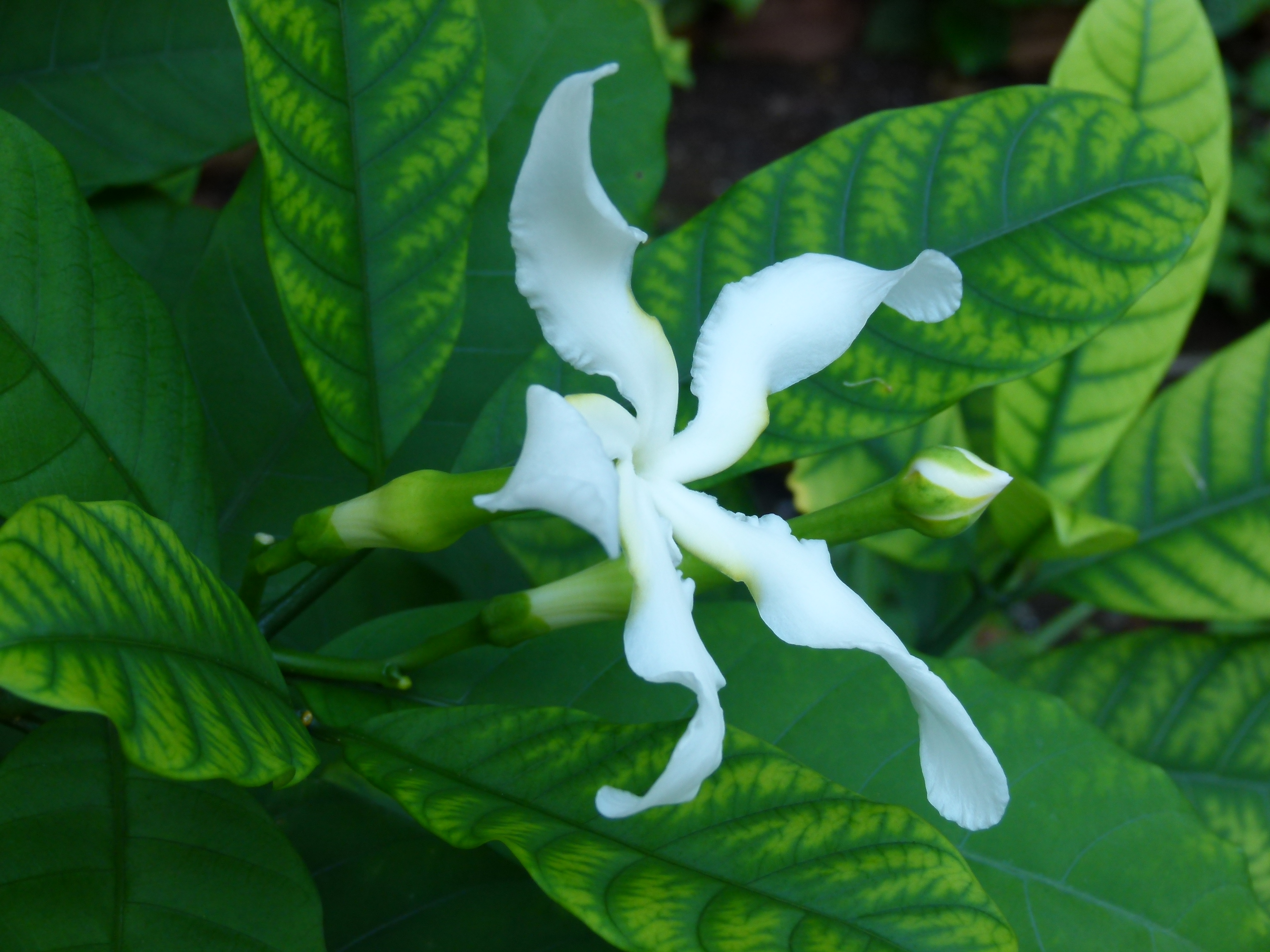
- In National Botanical Garden of Seychelles

Conservation status
- Least Concern (IUCN 3.1)

Scientific classification
- Kingdom: Plantae
- Clade: Embryophytes
- Clade: Tracheophytes
- Clade: Spermatophytes
- Clade: Angiosperms
- Clade: Eudicots
- Clade: Asterids
- Order: Gentianales
- Family: Apocynaceae
- Genus: Tabernaemontana
- Species: T. pachysiphon

Binomial name
- Tabernaemontana pachysiphon Stapf

Synonyms
- Conopharyngia angolensis (Stapf) Stapf; Conopharyngia cumminsii Stapf; Conopharyngia holstii (K.Schum) Stapf; Conopharyngia pachysiphon (Stapf) Stapf; Sarcopharyngia angolensis (Stapf) L.Allorge; Tabernaemontana angolensis Stapf; Tabernaemontana holstii K.Schum; Voacanga dichotoma K.Schum

= Tabernaemontana pachysiphon =

Species of plant

Tabernaemontana pachysiphon grows as a shrub or small tree up to 15 m (50 ft) tall, with a trunk diameter of up to 40 cm (16 in). Its fragrant flowers feature white to pale yellow corolla lobes. The fruit is green, almost spherical, up to 15 cm (6 in) in diameter. Its habitat is forests from sea level to 2,200 m (7,200 ft) altitude. Its numerous local medicinal uses include as a styptic, and as a treatment for headache, hypertension and to relieve cramps. The species is native to tropical Africa.
