= Octopus (yacht) =

Megayacht launched in 2003

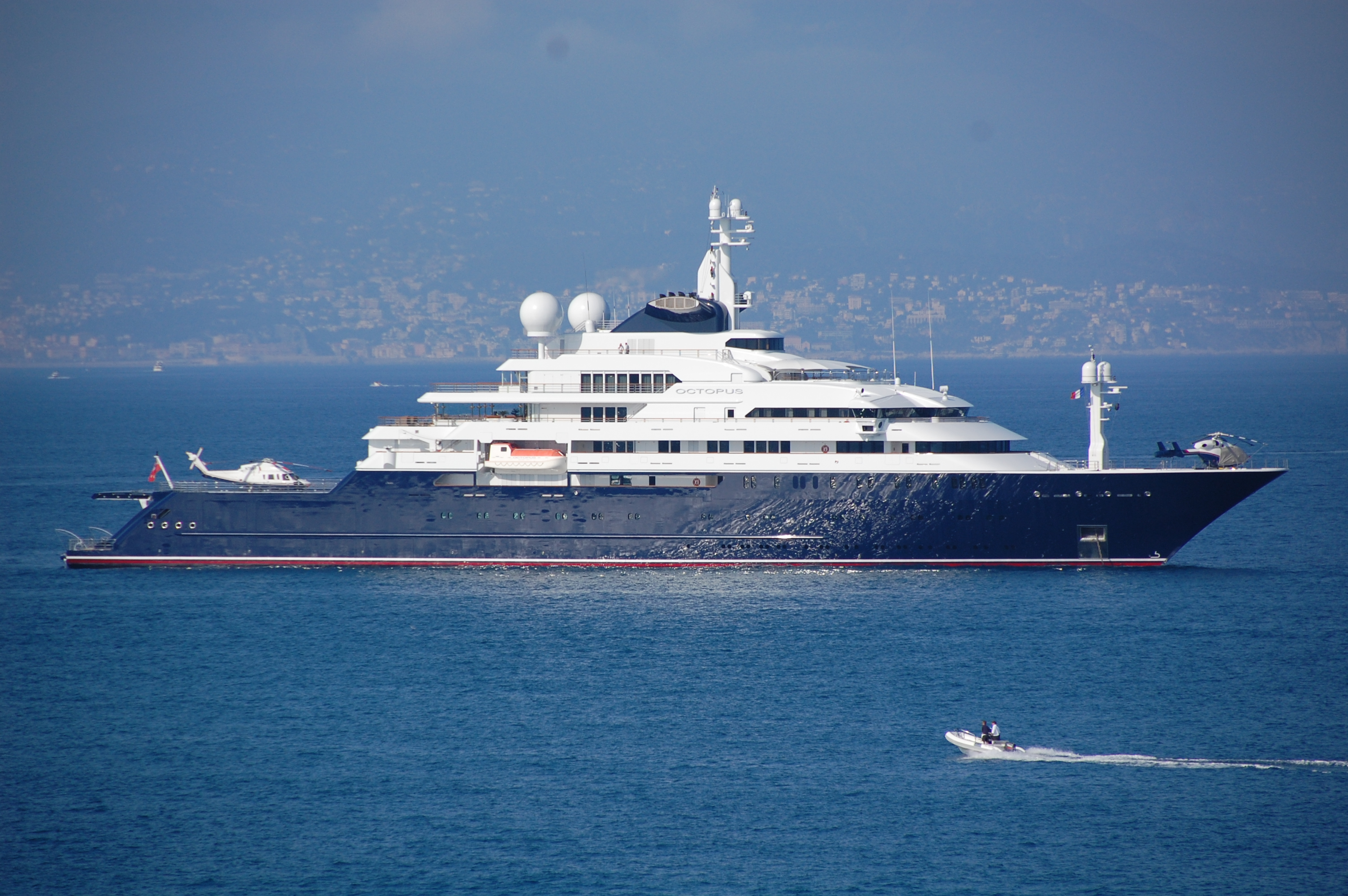
- Octopus in Antibes, July 21, 2009

History
- Name: Octopus
- Operator: Fraser Yachts
- Port of registry: Cayman Islands
- Builder: Lürssen
- Yard number: 13622
- Launched: August 1, 2003
- Completed: 2003
- Identification: IMO number: 1007213; MMSI number: 319866000; Callsign: ZCIS

General characteristics
- Type: Superyacht
- Tonnage: 9,932 GT; 2,979 NT
- Displacement: 8,850 t
- Length: 126.20 m (414 ft 1 in)
- Beam: 21.00 m (68 ft 11 in)
- Draft: 5.76 m (18 ft 11 in)
- Ice class: 1A
- Installed power: 8 diesel engines; total 19,200 hp (14,300 kW)
- Propulsion: 2 propellers
- Speed: 19 knots (35 km/h; 22 mph) max
- Range: 12,500 nmi (23,200 km; 14,400 mi)
- Capacity: 26
- Crew: 63

Octopus is a 126-metre (413 ft) megayacht built for Microsoft co-founder Paul Allen. She is one of the world's largest yachts. Launched in 2003 at a cost of $200 million, Octopus is a private vessel that has been loaned out for exploration projects, scientific research and rescue missions.

== Description ==
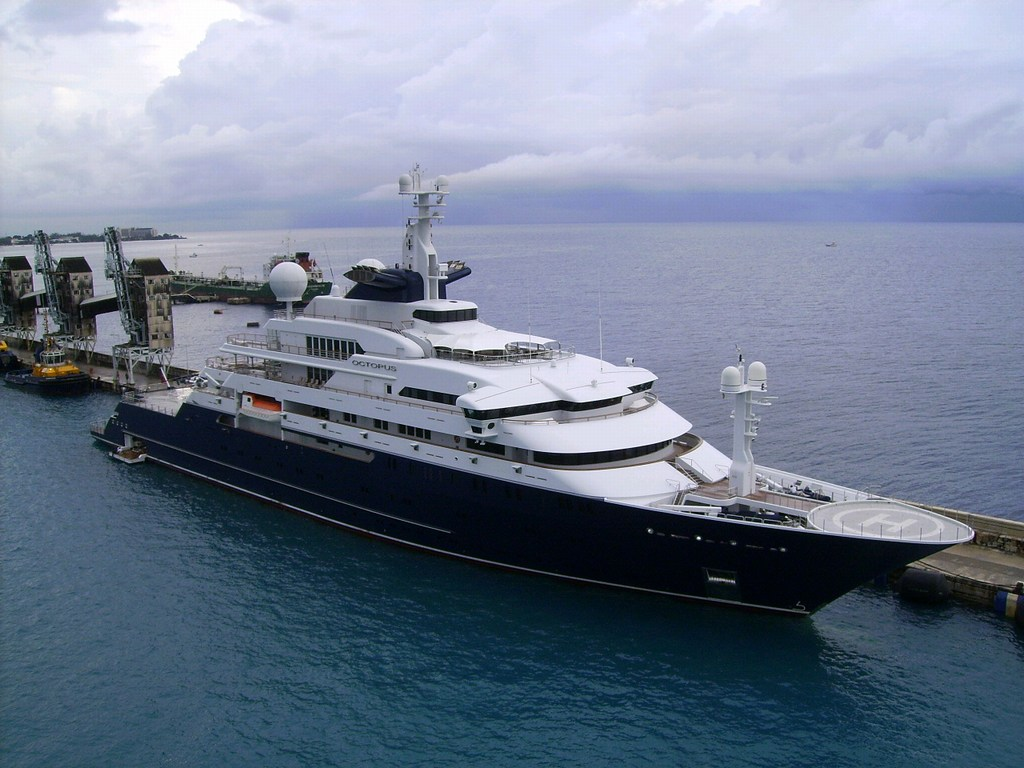
Octopus in Barbados, December 2, 2006

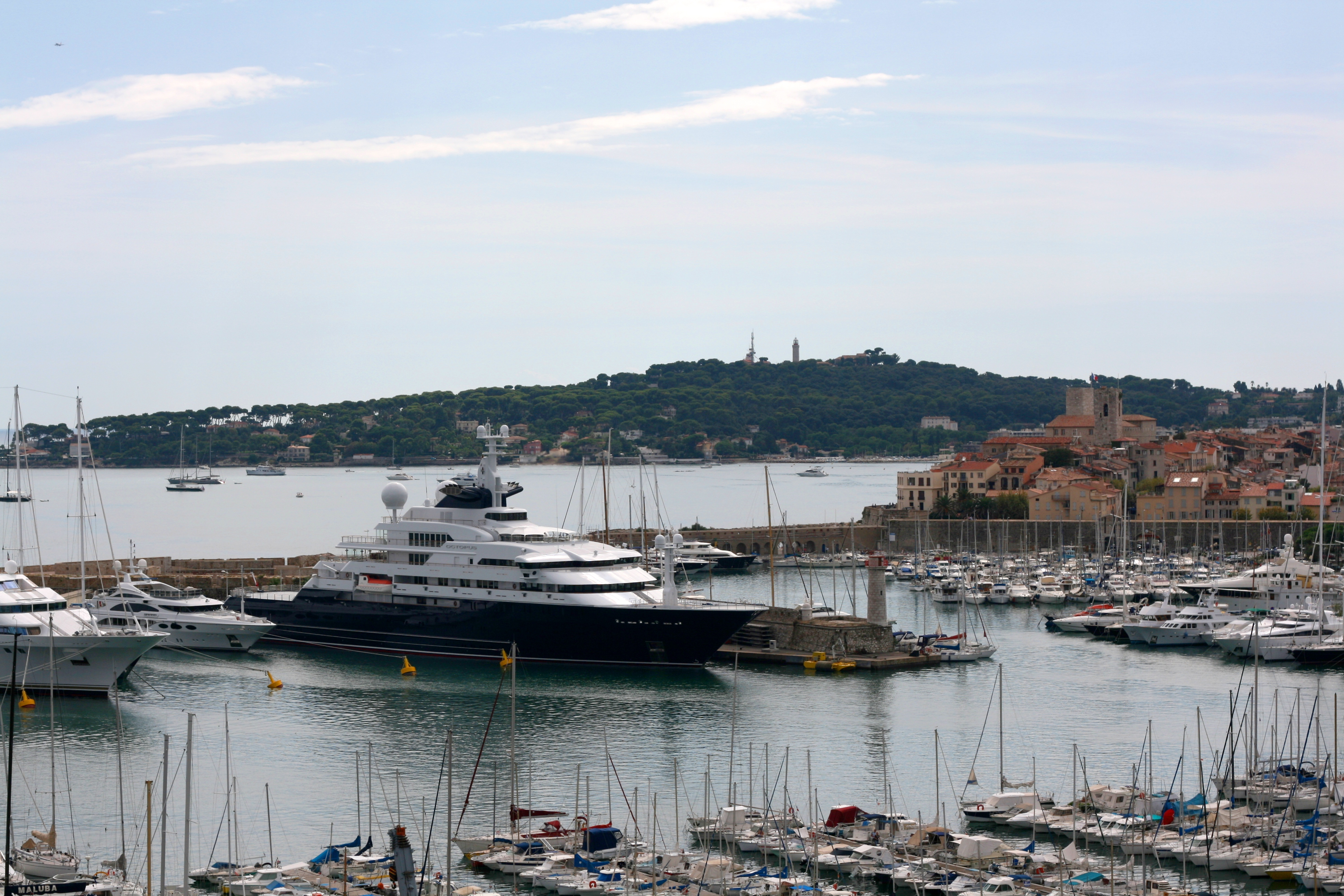
Octopus in Antibes Port Vauban, in 2009

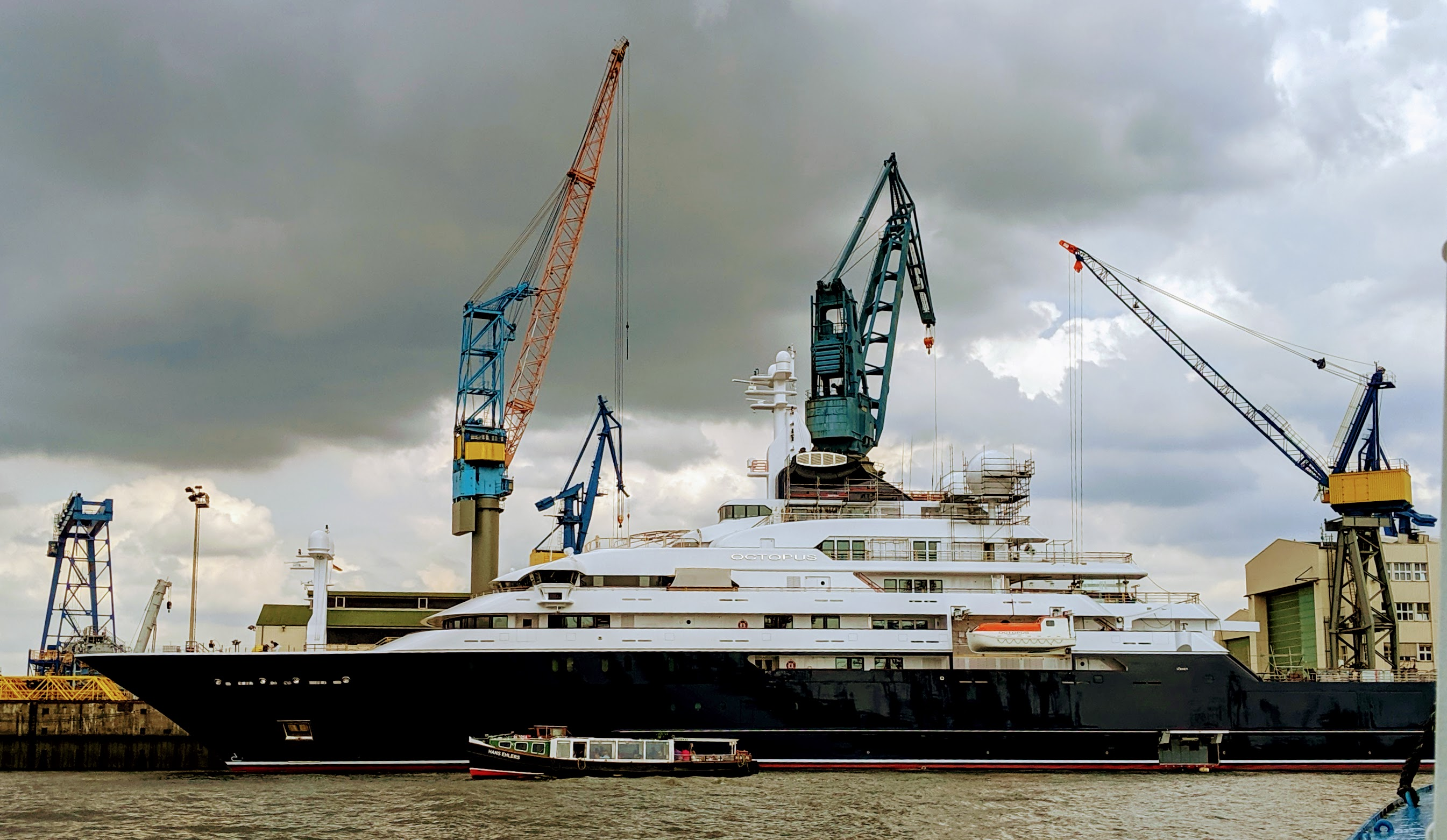
Octopus in Hamburg, August 1, 2019

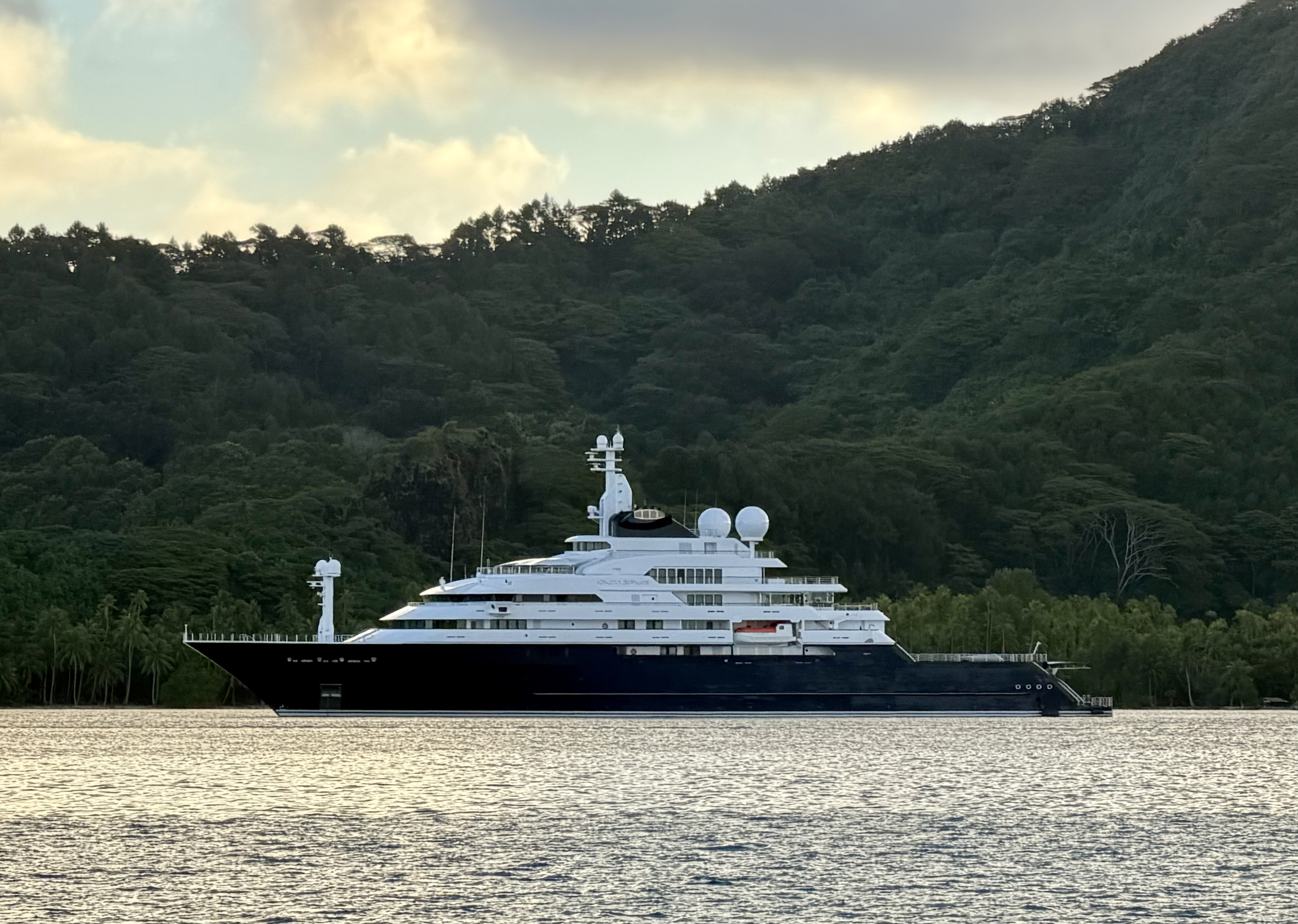
Octopus Yacht by Taha’a, French Polynesia (June 2026)

Octopus's exterior was designed by Espen Øino Naval Architects and built by the German shipbuilders Lürssen in Bremen and Howaldtswerke-Deutsche Werft in Kiel. The interior was by designer Jonathan Quinn Barnett.

Consisting of eight decks, including a private owners' deck, Octopus can host up to 26 guests accommodated in 13 staterooms and is crewed by a complement of 63 spread across 30 cabins. Entertainment facilities include several bars, a spa, library, cinema, gym, basketball court and multiple lounges including a forward-facing observation area. It has two helicopter pads on the main deck: a twin pad and hangars at the stern and a single pad on the bow; and a 43-foot (13 m) tender docked in the transom and a landing craft. There are a total of seven tenders aboard. The yacht also has a pool, located aft on one of its upper decks, and two submarines (one of them operated by remote control and capable of attaining greater depths). The latter was lent to Google Earth for the "Explore the Ocean" project. Side hatches at the water line form a dock for personal watercraft. At an economical cruising speed of 12.5 knots, Octopus has a range of 12,500 nmi.

== History ==
Allen loaned Octopus, which is equipped with a submarine and ROV, for a variety of rescue and research operations. These include assisting in a hunt for an American pilot and two officers whose plane disappeared off Palau, and loaning his yacht to scientists to study the coelacanth, a "living fossil" that was once believed to be extinct.

In January 2011, while en route to Antarctica, one of its helicopters was forced to make an emergency landing in the waters off the coast of Argentina. While the helicopter was severely damaged, there was no loss of life, with only the co-pilot suffering minor injuries. Allen was not aboard at the time.

In 2012, he loaned the ship to the Royal Navy in their attempt to retrieve the ship's bell from the Admiral-class battlecruiser HMS Hood, which sank to a depth of 9,000 feet (2,700 m) in the Denmark Strait during World War II, as a national memorial. HMS Hood was hit by a shell from the German battleship Bismarck; its magazines exploded and the ship sank in minutes with a loss of over 1,400 lives. The bell was located but not recovered, due to adverse weather conditions. On August 7, 2015 it was announced that the bell from HMS Hood had been recovered by the ROV operating from Octopus. After conservation, the bell was put on display in 2016 at the National Museum of the Royal Navy, Portsmouth.

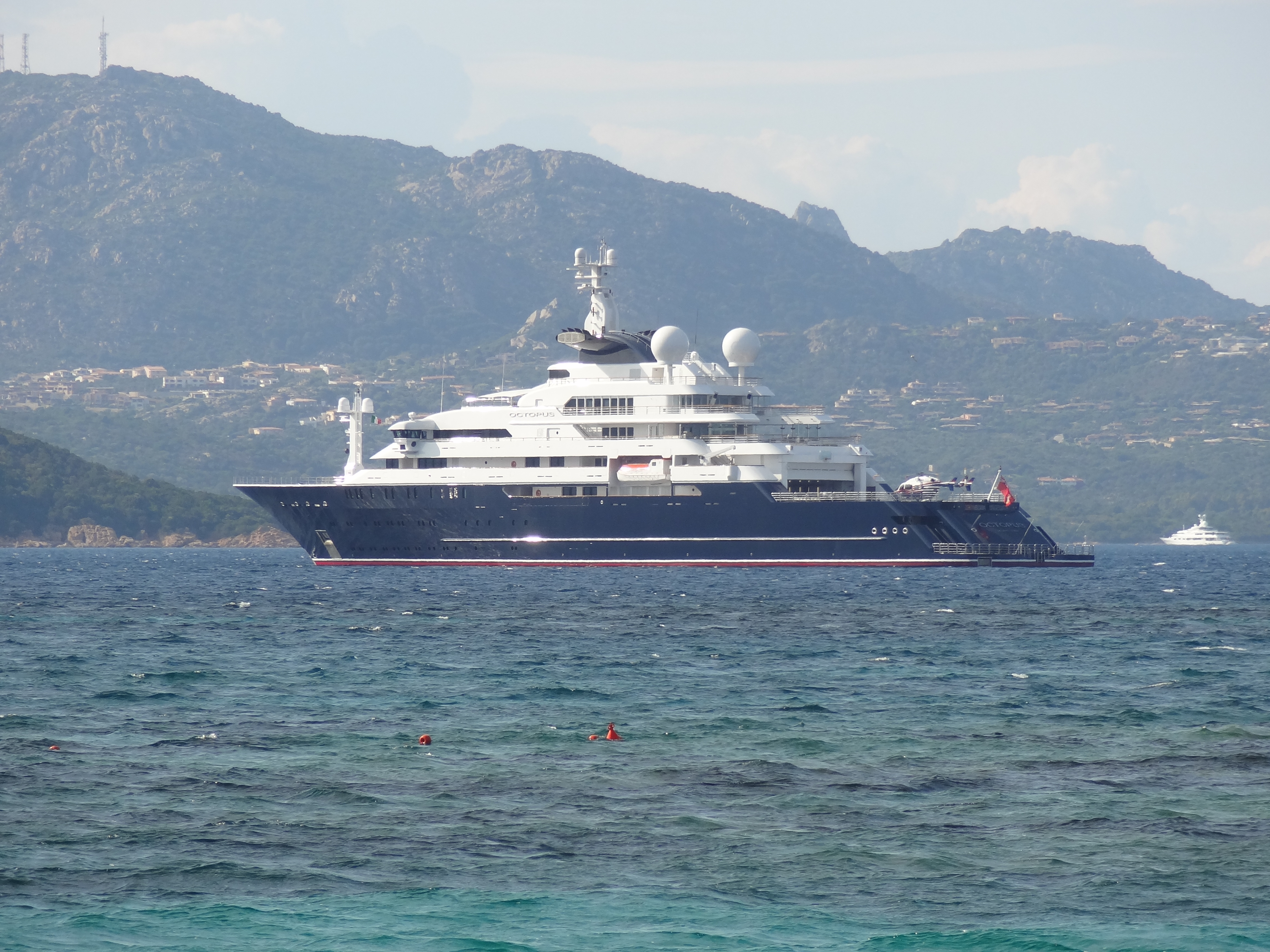
Octopus yacht in Sardegna

In March 2015, an Allen-led research team announced that it had found the Japanese battleship Musashi in the Sibuyan Sea off the coast of the Philippines. Armed with 46 cm (18.1 in) main guns and displacing 73,000 tonnes (72,000 long tons) at full load, Musashi and its sister ship Yamato were the largest and most heavily armed battleships in naval history.

Allen died in 2018. From December 2018 to July 2019, the yacht underwent a refit at Blohm+Voss and was advertised for sale in September 2019 with an asking price of €295 million. The asking price was later reduced to €235 million and the yacht was sold to an anonymous buyer in 2021. Later on, the buyer was announced by insideryachtfan.com to be the Swedish "pharma billionaire" Roger Samuelsson.
