= MV Tourist No. 2 =

- Tourist No. 2
- U.S. National Register of Historic Places
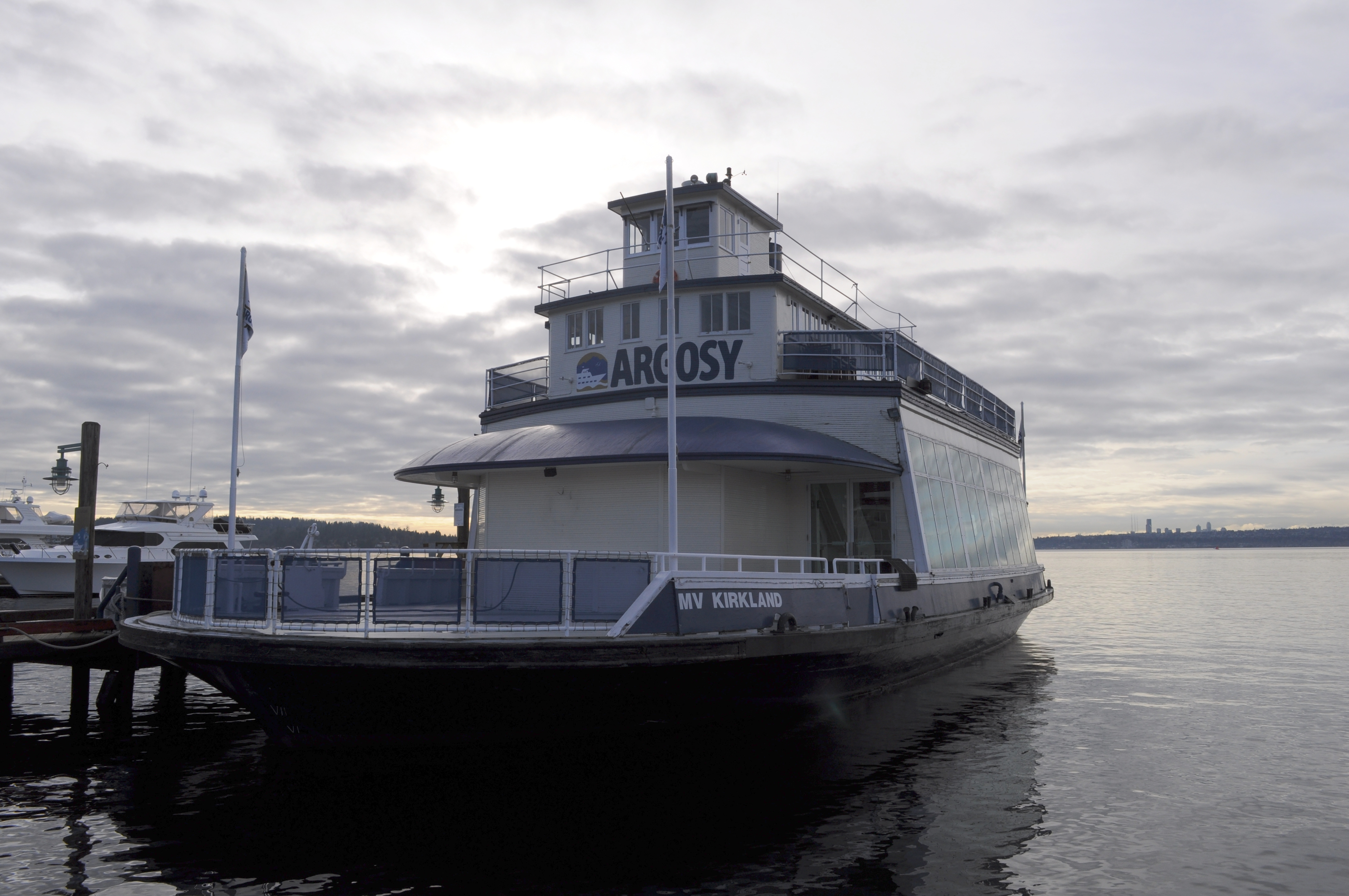
- MV Kirkland moored at Marina Park Dock, Kirkland, Washington.

- Location within Oregon
- Location: Kirkland, Washington, at time of listing (Astoria, Oregon when sunk and subsequently demolished)
- Coordinates: 46°11′49.0″N 123°47′50.6″W
- Built: 1924
- NRHP reference No.: 97000321
- Added to NRHP: April 15, 1997

The MV Tourist No. 2 was a 1924 wooden-hulled car ferry that served passengers all over the Pacific Northwest. Originally, it took passengers across the Columbia River, with a dock in Astoria, Oregon. It was undergoing restoration in Astoria until it sunk in 2022. It was listed on the National Register of Historic Places in Washington, in 1997, as the Tourist II.

== History ==
With the exception of the Second World War, from 1924 to 1966, MV Tourist No. 2 was in service on the Astoria–Megler Ferry route on the Columbia River. Following the bombing of Pearl Harbor in 1941, the US Army purchased the vessel as the FB or JMP 535 to lay mines at the mouth of the river. At the end of the war, it returned to ferry service on the Columbia. The ferry was moved from Astoria, Oregon to Pierce County, Washington, in 1967 and renamed the Islander of Pierce County. It worked on Puget Sound for many years, but eventually, its wooden-hull design was overshadowed by vessels with more modern steel-hull designs.

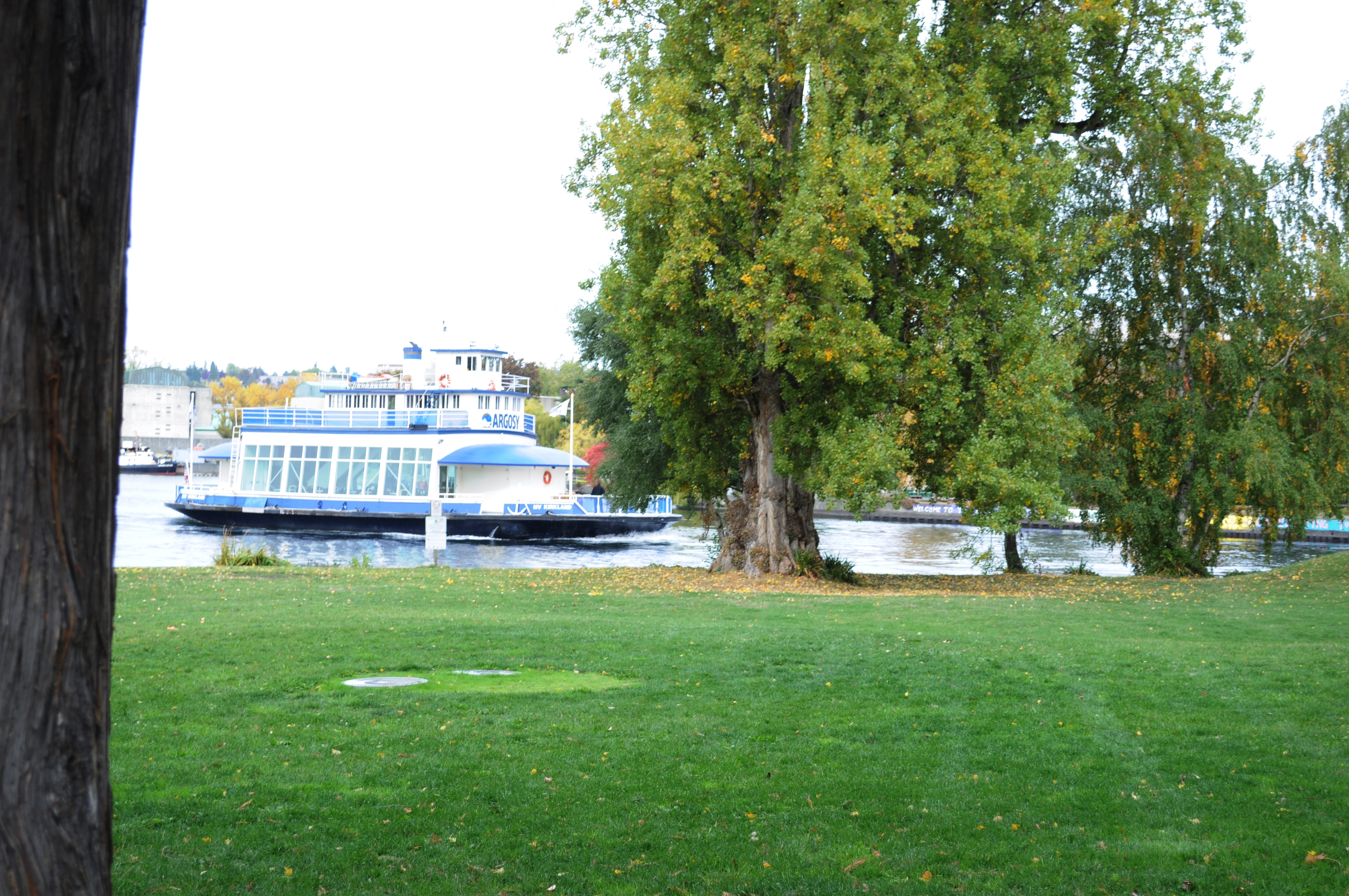
MV Kirkland motoring rapidly along the Lake Washington Ship Canal, seen here from West Montlake Park, Seattle.

In 1996, new private owners Argosy Cruises bought the vessel and renamed it Kirkland. They refurbished it, adding two full-service bars, a galley, and 12-foot floor-to-ceiling windows, making the main deck unique among vessels in the Northwest. The exterior styling, deck plan, and interior and general arrangement were provided by designer Jonathan Quinn Barnett, of Seattle. The vessel is listed on the Washington Historic Register and the National Register of Historic Places.

Early morning on August 28, 2010, the vessel caught fire while docked at its Kirkland, Washington pier. The fire was confined to the engine room. Firefighters were quoted as saying everything below deck was "toast". The boat was moved from Lake Washington during the morning of August 31, 2010, by the tug Dixie, part of the Fremont Tug Company.

The vessel was sold to Christian Lint in 2010 after Argosy Cruise Lines concluded that it was not economical to repair the fire damage. Lint moored the vessel in Bremerton and used it for special events. In 2016, Lint sold the vessel to the Astoria Ferry Group, and returned it to Astoria on August 1. By 2017, restoration of the vessel was underway. As of 2019, restoration was continuing.

Tourist No. 2 partially sank in the Columbia River in Astoria where it was moored and for sale on July 28, 2022. It was demolished in situ and removed in September 2022.
