= The Big Tree (Oda) =

Tree in Ghana

Coordinates: 05°50′26.4″N 00°49′13.3″W

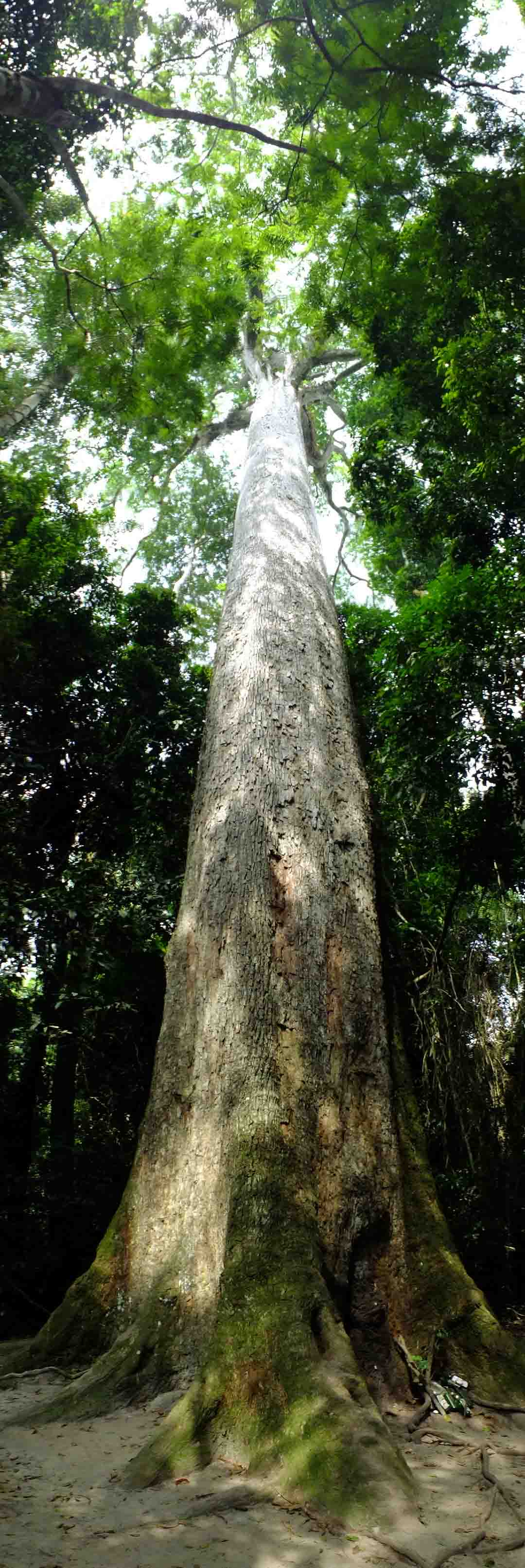
The Big Tree Oda

The Big Tree is a tree near the town of Akim Oda which is 66.5 m (218 ft) tall and 396 cm (13 ft) in diameter, and believed to be the biggest tree ever discovered in Ghana and West Africa. It is a member of the species Tieghemella heckelii. It is located in the Esen Apam Forest Reserve, about 22 kilometers from Akim Oda, about 300 m (1,000 ft) off the Oda-Agona Swedru trunk road. The tree is known to be between 350 and 400 years old, and has a low natural generational success rate which is a contributory factor to its likelihood of extinction.

== History ==
There are many spiritual myths about the discovery of the tree. It is believed that the tree was discovered by Yaw Andoh a hunter named from Akim Asanteman, several years ago.

== Beliefs ==
The tree serves as a heritage object and also a spiritual object. There is a belief there could be some spiritual powers behind it. This has led many visiting the tree to perform sacrifices and prayer as well as offer gifts to it. It is also believed that the tree is able to heal a sick person who visits the site to perform the necessary rituals. Others also are of the view that infertile women are able to conceive when they use the leaves and the bark of the tree as herbs

== Tourism ==
The tree has a thick grey bark and is cylindrical. It is also longitudinally ridged with slash bright pink leaves which attracts tourists.

The tree has attracted many people from different parts of the world, especially Indian and Asia continents. And also people in Ghana also, it is a very beautiful place to go for an excursion to see the wonderful things nature has in stored for Ghanaians.And people around the world
