= Frida Zachariassen =

Frida Zachariassen (September 24, 1912 – April 27, 1992) was a Faroese painter and writer. She is considered one of the Faroe Islands' most distinctive midcentury artists.

== Biography ==
Frida was born in 1912 in Klaksvík, a town in the Faroe Islands. She was one of nine children born to Magdalena Jacobsen and Jógvan Rasmussen, who was the leading figure in the town at the time.

After finishing school, she traveled to Denmark, where she lived for six years and began to take painting classes. While she qualified to attend the Royal Danish Academy of Fine Arts, she felt it would not be a prudent financial decision, and she studied business instead. After further travels in England, she returned to the Faroe Islands just before World War II and got an office job at the shipping company J. F. Kjølbro in her hometown.

While she married Guttormur Zachariassen in 1944, he died in a wreck less than a year later. She lived in Copenhagen again for a few years in the late 1940s before returning to Klaksvík for good, taking a job overseeing the region's health insurance program while continuing to paint.

Zachariassen died on April 27, 1992, at age 79.

== Work ==
Zachariassen is best known for her work as a painter in the Faroe Islands. The height of her creative output was in the 1950s and '60s.

Her early work in the '30s and '40s is more romantic in style, but her midcentury work takes on more abstract, cubist elements. Zachariassen's paintings were always figurative, however. Her painting style was "characterized by geometric figures in compositions portraying landscapes, towns, villages, and people." Critics also note her innovative use of color.

Despite her stylistic innovations, Zachariassen's work, which frequently depicts the relationship between humans and nature, is firmly grounded in the Faroese landscape painting tradition.

In the 1970s, Zachariassen turned to writing when her eyesight diminished and painting became difficult. She published several children's books, including Tá ið Jón vaks upp 20-30 árin in 1978 and Barnaár 1979 and Brún og brá the following year. In 1980, she published Strev í málrøkt, a book on the Faroese language.

In 2010, her work was exhibited posthumously at Listasavn Føroya, the Faroe Islands' national art museum in Tórshavn. The following year, the Faroese postal service issued stamps featuring her work.

Paintings by Zachariassen, featured on postage stamps
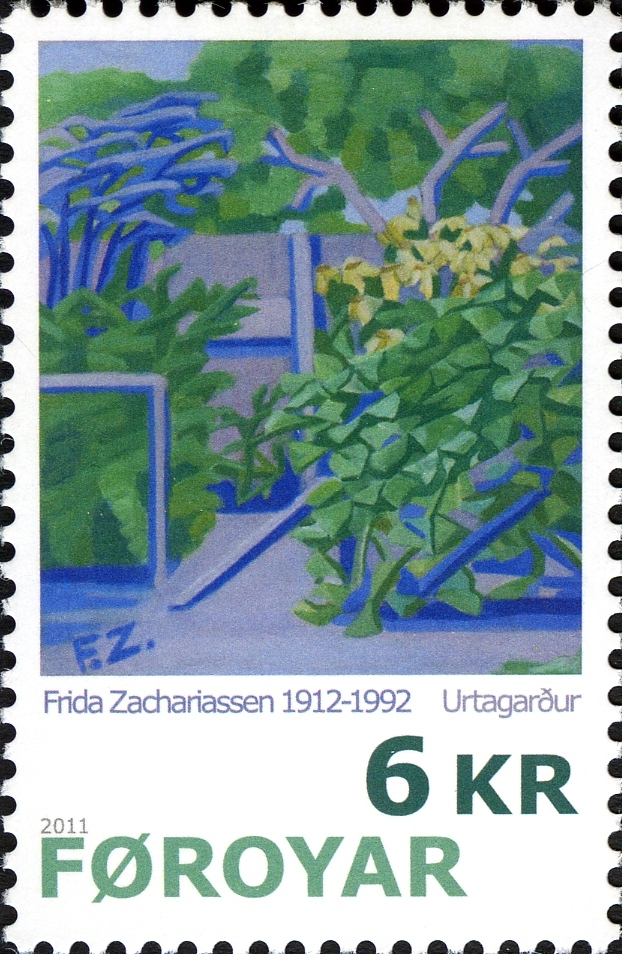
"Urtagarður" ("The Garden")

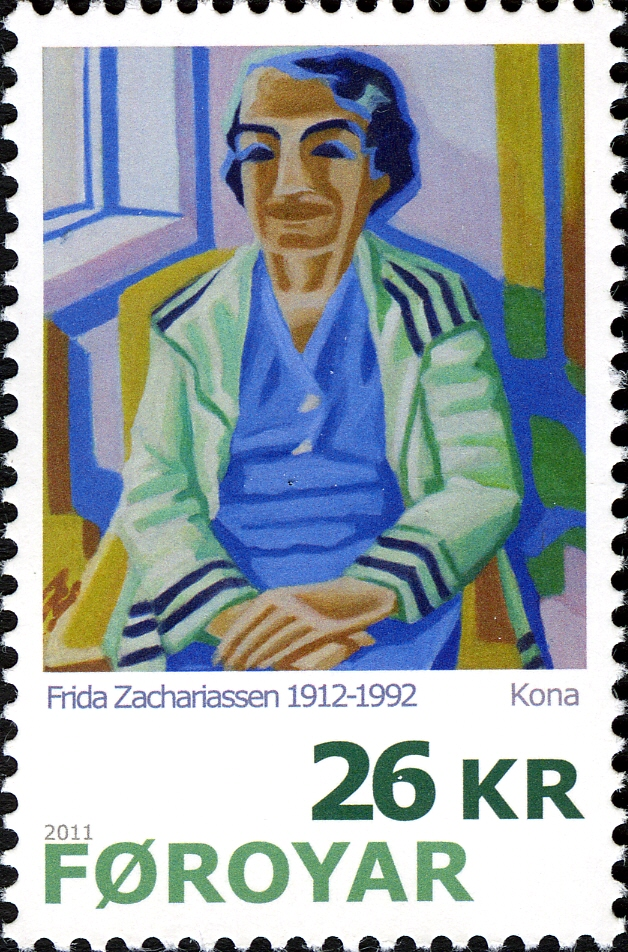
"Kona" ("Woman")
