= Tieghemella africana =

Conservation status
- Endangered (IUCN 2.3)

Scientific classification
- Kingdom: Plantae
- Clade: Tracheophytes
- Clade: Angiosperms
- Clade: Eudicots
- Clade: Asterids
- Order: Ericales
- Family: Sapotaceae
- Genus: Tieghemella
- Species: T. africana

Binomial name
- Tieghemella africana Pierre

Species of tree

Tieghemella africana is a tree species of the genus Tieghemella in the plant family Sapotaceae. It occurs in Cameroon, the Republic of the Congo, Gabon, and Sierra Leone and is threatened by habitat loss and overharvesting.
