= Inglenook (winery) =

Winery in Rutherford, California, US

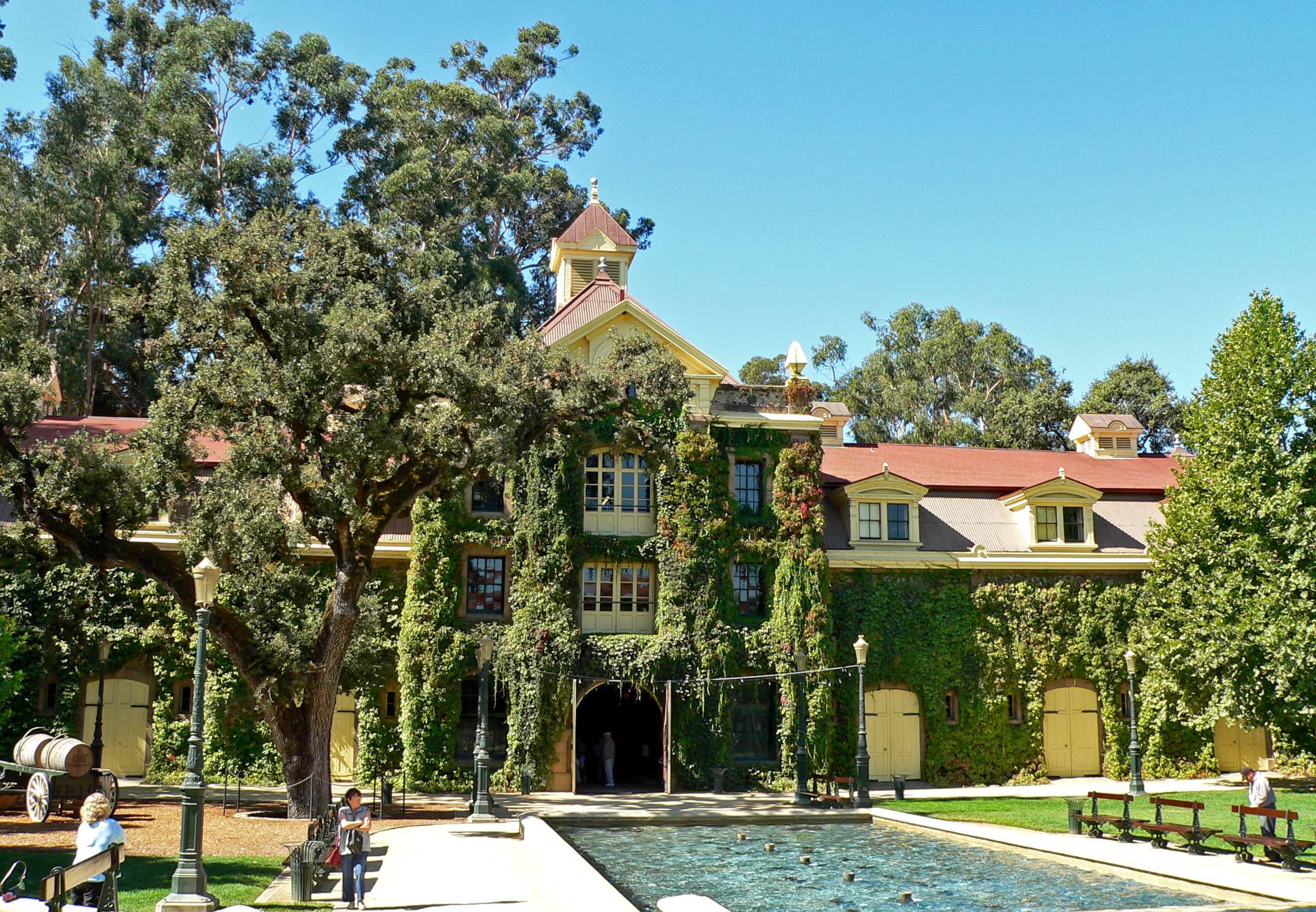
- Location: Rutherford, California, US
- Coordinates: 38°27′17.6″N 122°25′49.9″W
- Appellation: Rutherford AVA
- Formerly: Rubicon Estate Winery, Niebaum-Coppola Estate Winery
- Founded: 1879
- Key people: Francis Ford Coppola, owner
- Known for: Rubicon
- Varietals: Cabernet Sauvignon, Zinfandel, Syrah, Merlot, Cabernet Franc, Rhone Varietals (Marsanne, Roussane, Viognier)
- Tasting: Open to public, reservations required for parties of 9 or more.
- Website: www.inglenook.com

Inglenook is a winery that produces estate bottled wines in Rutherford, California, in the Napa Valley.

== History ==
Inglenook in the 19th century

The winery was founded in 1879 by a Finnish Sea Captain Gustave Niebaum. Niebaum's employee Hamden McIntyre was not an architect but he designed gravity flow wineries for Inglenook and Far Niente along with other wineries of the decade. Niebaum died in 1908 and the winery was shut down during Prohibition. Upon the repeal of Prohibition in the United States, Niebaum's widow, Suzanne Niebaum, reopened Inglenook and brought in a viticulturist and an enologist to upgrade the winemaking system. Niebaum's great-nephew, John Daniel Jr., took over operations in 1939.

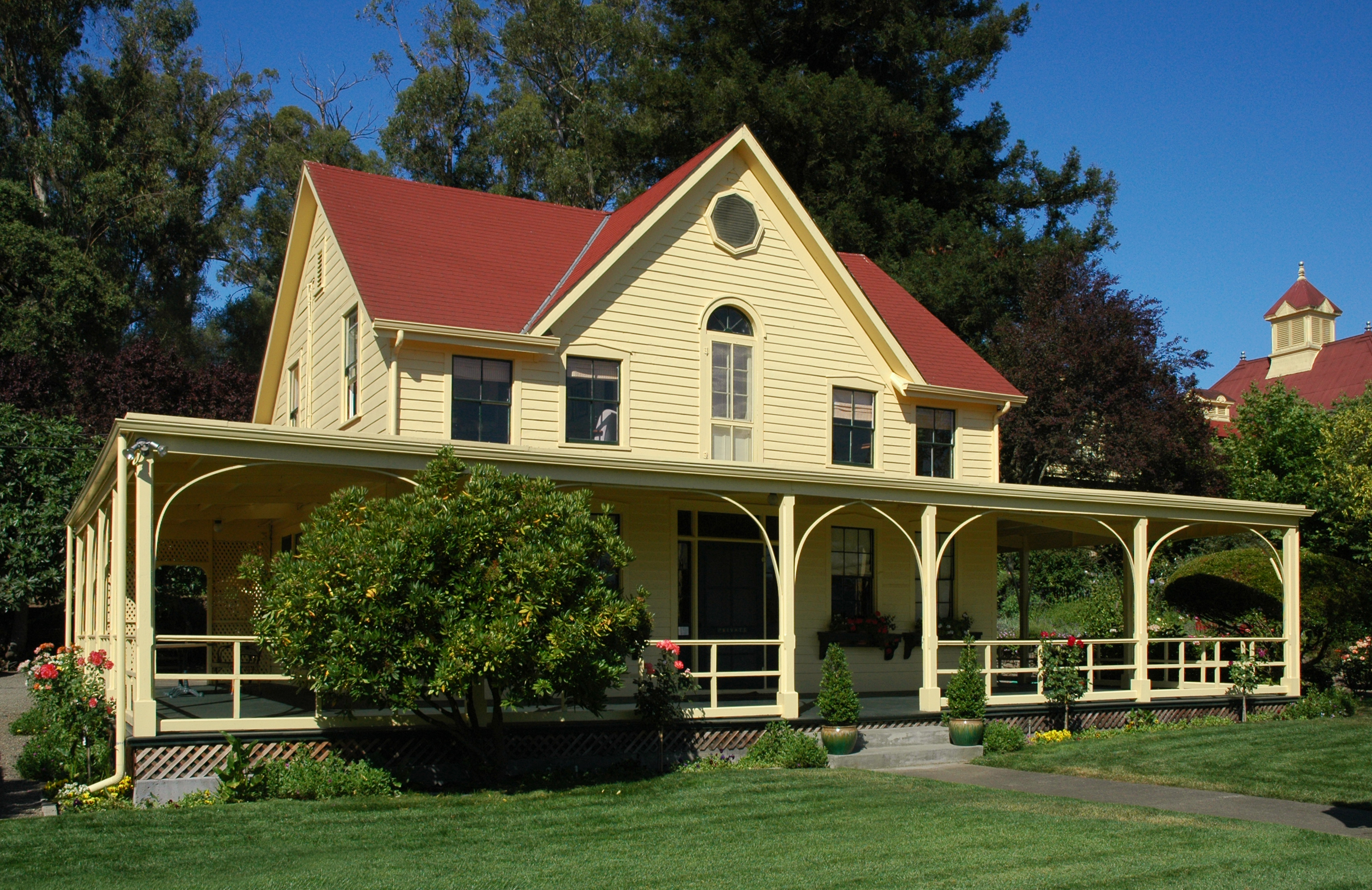
The Chiles House on the property is one of the oldest buildings in the Napa Valley. It was built in 1856 and later moved to the winery.

In 1943, film producer Joseph Judson Cohn acquired the 195-acre (79 ha) property adjacent to Inglenook Winery. In 1945 Cohn was persuaded by his neighbor John Daniel Jr., then in charge of Inglenook, to plant grape vines on his estate. 80 acres (32 ha) were planted with Cabernet Sauvignon, and the fruit from the J. J. Cohn Estate was sold to Inglenook for years. Inglenook flourished during the 1940s and 1950s until it was sold to Allied Grape Growers in 1964.

More than 1,500 acres (610 ha) of the Inglenook property were acquired by Francis Ford Coppola in 1975 with profits of his film, The Godfather. The brand name and the remaining 94 acres (38 ha), including the historic winery, were bought by Heublein, Inc., which began making lower quality wines produced elsewhere under the Inglenook label. Under the leadership of Dennis Fife, Inglenook again began producing critically acclaimed wines. Heublein was later bought by RJR Nabisco, then sold to Grand Metropolitan in 1987. Heublein sold the winery to the Canandaigua Wine Company (which later became Constellation Brands) in 1994. Canandaigua consolidated winemaking operations elsewhere and sold the remaining acreage and winery to Coppola in 1995. In the French tradition, Coppola combined his name with the original owner, naming the facility Niebaum-Coppola Estate Winery. Coppola later renamed it the Rubicon Estate Winery. In January 2008, The Wine Group announced that it would purchase Almaden Vineyards, the Inglenook label, and the Paul Masson Winery in Madera, California from Constellation Brands for $134 million in cash.

On April 11, 2011, Francis Ford Coppola acquired the iconic Inglenook trademark, paying more, he said, than he had for the entire estate and announced that the estate would once again be known by its historic name, Inglenook.

== See also ==
- California wine
