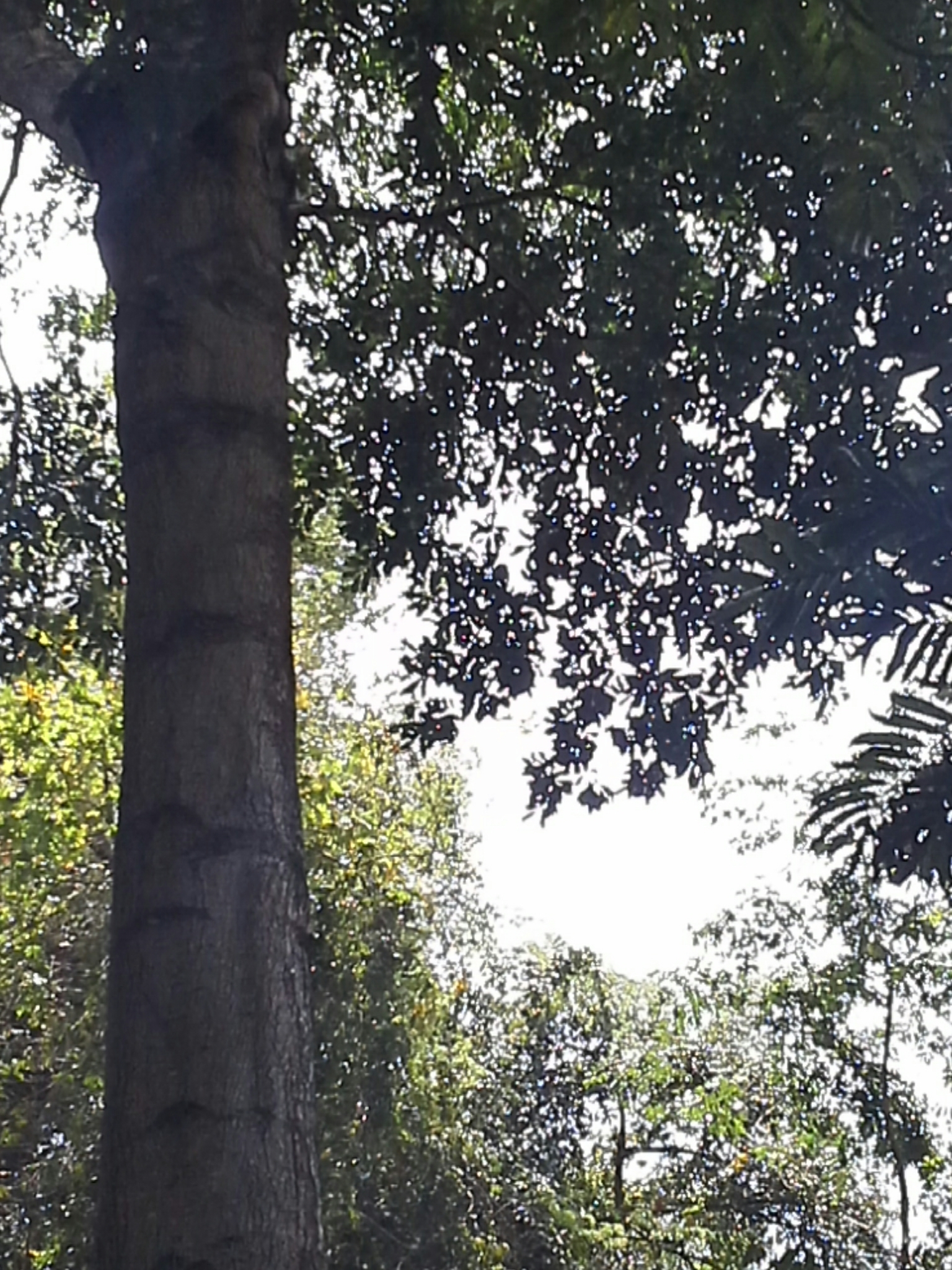

Conservation status
- Endangered (IUCN 2.3)

Scientific classification
- Kingdom: Plantae
- Clade: Tracheophytes
- Clade: Angiosperms
- Clade: Eudicots
- Clade: Asterids
- Order: Ericales
- Family: Sapotaceae
- Genus: Tieghemella
- Species: T. heckelii

Binomial name
- Tieghemella heckelii (A.Chev.) Pierre ex Dubard

Synonyms
- Baillonella heckelii (A.Chev.) Baehni; Dumoria heckelii A.Chev. Mimusops heckelii (A.Chev.) Hutch. & Dalziel

= Tieghemella heckelii =

Species of tree

Tieghemella heckelii (also called baku or cherry mahogany) is a tree species of the genus Tieghemella in the plant family Sapotaceae. The species occurs in Cameroon, Ivory Coast, Gabon, Ghana, Liberia, Nigeria, and Sierra Leone and is threatened by habitat loss and over exploitation. This timber tree species can grow up to 45 meters tall and 1.2 meters in diameter. One individual, the Big Tree of Oda, is 66.5 m (218 ft) tall and 396 cm (13 ft) in diameter and is believed to be the tallest tree in West Africa.
