= Heini Zachariassen =

Heini Zachariassen (born 1972) is a Faroese technology entrepreneur and the founder of the wine application Vivino. He previously co-founded the cybersecurity firm BullGuard.

== Early life and education ==
Zachariassen was born and raised in the Faroe Islands. At the age of 22, he moved to Denmark, where he earned a bachelor’s degree in economics and business administration in Denmark.

== Career ==
In 1999, Zachariassen co-founded the security firm Virus112 and served as its CTO. In 2002, he co-founded the antivirus software company BullGuard and served as its CEO until 2008.

In 2010, Zachariassen co-founded Vivino with Theis Søndergaard in Copenhagen. The company launched a mobile application in 2010 that allows users to scan wine labels to access crowd-sourced ratings and reviews. The platform's user base grew from 12,000 in 2011 to over 50 million by 2021. During his tenure, Vivino expanded into an e-commerce marketplace. By 2021, Vivino had raised over $220 million in venture funding, including a Series D round.

In June 2018, Zachariassen stepped down as CEO and transitioned to the roles of board member and Chief Evangelist. Zachariassen has also created a YouTube series, Raw Startup, which offers advice on entrepreneurship.

== Personal life ==
Heini Zachariassen is married to Maibritt Juul Zachariassen, and they have three children. In 2013, he moved his family and Vivino's headquarters from Denmark to San Francisco, California. The family returned to Copenhagen in 2020.
