= Philippe Melka =

French-American winemaker

- Occupation: Winemaker

Philippe Melka is a French-American winemaker. He operates his own wine label, Melka, and has consulted for BRAND Napa Valley, Fairchild Napa Valley, Cliff Lede, Hundred Acre, Seavy, Sosie, and more.

== See also ==
- List of wine personalities
