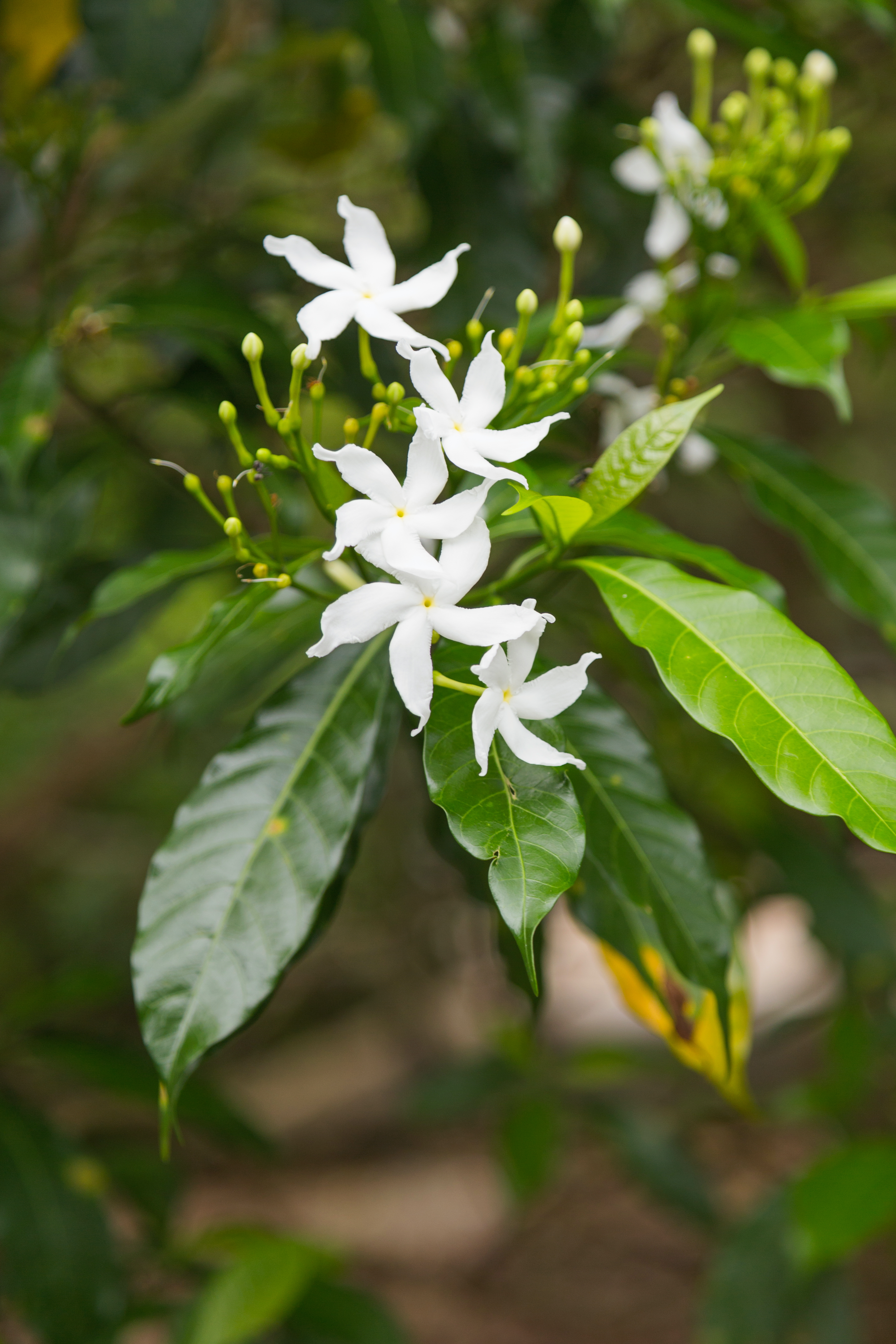
- Flowering at Singapore Botanic Gardens

Conservation status
- Least Concern (IUCN 3.1)

Scientific classification
- Kingdom: Plantae
- Clade: Tracheophytes
- Clade: Angiosperms
- Clade: Eudicots
- Clade: Asterids
- Order: Gentianales
- Family: Apocynaceae
- Genus: Tabernaemontana
- Species: T. africana

Binomial name
- Tabernaemontana africana Hook.

Synonyms
- Tabernaemontana grandiflora Hook.; Conopharyngia chippii Stapf; Conopharyngia longiflora (Benth.) Stapf; Tabernaemontana chippii (Stapf) Pichon; Tabernaemontana longiflora Benth.

= Tabernaemontana africana =

Species of plant

Tabernaemontana africana, commonly known as Samoan gardenia, is a species of plant in the oleander and frangipani family Apocynaceae native to tropical west Africa from Senegal to Ghana. It is an evergreen perennial shrub with a maximum height of 6 meters. The plant is used to produce latex, soap and dye.
