= Gustave Niebaum =

Finnish-American sea captain and winemaker

Gustave Ferdinand Niebaum
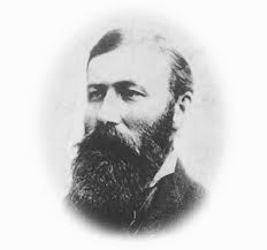
- Born: Gustaf Ferdinand Nybom; August 31, 1842; Helsinki, Finland
- Died: August 5, 1908 (aged 65); San Francisco, California, U.S.
- Occupations: Sea Captain; Winemaker
- Known for: One of the original commercial winemakers in the Napa County

Gustave Ferdinand Niebaum (born Gustaf Ferdinand Nybom; 31 August 1842 – 5 August 1908) was a Finnish-American sea captain and winemaker.

Niebaum acquired his maritime schooling in Helsinki, Finland. By the end of 1860s, he had become one of the world's leading fur traders. Among his many known accomplishments, Niebaum founded the Alaskan Commercial Company in San Francisco, California. He also prepared some of the first official maps of the coastline of Alaska. As the Consul of Russia in the United States in 1867 (at the time Finland was an autonomous Grand Duchy of Russia), Niebaum helped explore the territory and promoted ratification of the Alaska Purchase.

== Origins and name ==
Born in Helsinki, Finland, as Gustaf Ferdinand Nybom to a Swedish-speaking family, as the younger of two sons. This spelling of his name is rendered in the original Swedish form. His father, a police officer, died when the boy was four years old. As a 16-year-old Gustaf first came to Alaska on a voyage aboard a ship owned by the Russian-American Company. During this period both Alaska and Finland were regions under Russian control. On his return he studied for his Master's exam in Helsinki and was soon back in Alaska working as a helmsman. He later advanced to the rank of captain. Alaska came under American control in October 1867 and Nybom formed a new company with five partners, the Hansen, Nybom & Co, and they became wealthy seal-skin traders. They sold Alaskan seal skins in San Francisco and made California their new home.

In time, after many years of trading and building his wealth, Gustaf Nybom eventually changed his name to the German form of Gustave Niebaum. It is believed that he did so to fit in with his many partners who were German Jews. Some of his German partners had seen the potential for planting wine grapes in the fertile Napa Valley and had done so since the 1860s. Gustave married a German-American woman in 1873. Niebaum and his wife purchased 450 acres on prime land in 1879 and began making their own wine.

== Winery ==
In 1879 Niebaum established Inglenook Winery in Rutherford, California, a small village in Napa Valley.

Captain Niebaum had originally wanted to establish a fine winery in France, but his California-born wife objected to long ocean voyages and preferred Napa instead.

A number of Niebaum's colleagues and employees from the Alaska Commercial Company also joined him in creating Napa County wineries of their own – Benson at Far Niente and later on John Parrott's son Tiburcio. (John Parrott was the financier behind the Alaska Commercial Company). Niebaum's employee Hamden McIntyre was not an architect but he designed gravity flow wineries for Inglenook and Far Niente along with other wineries of the decade.

From the beginning Inglenook was Niebaum's pride and joy and he worked hard to create quality wines, taking frequent trips to Europe to observe vineyards and winery practices (in Germany, France, Spain, Portugal, Hungary and Italy), and then importing a wide variety of European vines and following high standards in winemaking. His wine library contained 600 books he collected on his travels.

At first, Black Malvoisie, a low-quality grape, which he inherited on the property, was replaced with Sauvignon Blanc purchased in San Jose. Later when he brought back cuttings from Europe, he planted Pinot Noir, Grenache, Carignan, Tannat, Cabernet Sauvignon, Merlot, Petit Verdot, and Malbec as well as the white wine grapes White Riesling, Semillon, Chenin Blanc, Burger and Chalosse. Extreme care was taken during the winemaking process to remove stems and leaves from the grapes, and he was the only Napa vintner of his time to bottle his wines on his estate (until he could no longer afford to). (Most wineries shipped their wine in bulk.)

The result was that Inglenook wines became world-renowned, winning gold medals in the World's Fair of Paris in 1889 and maintaining their reputation for high quality through the decades into the 1919 Panama-Pacific International Exhibition in San Francisco where Inglenook wines won 19 gold medals, far surpassing any other California winery. Niebaum died in 1908, but his wife hired competent managers notably Carl Bundschu, to continue the enterprise.

After Prohibition, operation of Niebaum's vineyards and winery passed on to his great nephew John Daniels Jr., whom Bundschu had mentored, in 1939, following the death of Suzanne Niebaum, Gustave's widow, in 1938. The Daniel era lasted through 1964 when the winery was, tragically, sold to corporate interests.

Francis Ford Coppola purchased the vineyards in 1975 with proceeds from The Godfather. Coppola released his first vintage in 1977 under the Niebaum-Coppola label. In 1995 Coppola purchased the remaining acreage and chateau style winery which were part of the original Niebaum estate. In 2006 the winery was renamed Rubicon Estate Winery. In 2011, Coppola purchased the name Inglenook and reunited the winery, the vineyards and the brand name.

In 2007, Gustave Niebaum was posthumously inducted into the Culinary Institute of America's Vintner's Hall of Fame.

== Awards and recognition ==
- In 1889, Inglenook wines won gold medals in the World's Fair of Paris, and was the most successful non-French winery.
- In 1919, Inglenook wines won 19 gold medals at the 1919 Panama-Pacific International Exhibition in San Francisco.
- In 2007, Gustave Niebaum was posthumously inducted into the Culinary Institute of America's Vintner's Hall of Fame.

== See also ==
- List of wine personalities
