= Rubicon Estate Winery =

Winery in California, United States

Coordinates: 38.454366°N 122.431013°W

Rubicon Estate Winery (now named Inglenook)
- Location: Rutherford, California, USA
- Appellation: Rutherford AVA
- Formerly: Niebaum-Coppola Estate Winery
- Founded: 1879
- Key people: Anshul Taneja, JJM Hotels Group Owners
- Known for: Rubicon
- Varietals: Cabernet Sauvignon, Zinfandel, Cabernet Franc, Merlot, Syrah
- Distribution: national
- Tasting: open to the public
- Website: www.inglenook.com

The Rubicon Estate Winery (formerly Niebaum-Coppola Estate Winery and once again Inglenook) is located in Rutherford, California, United States. The winery sits on a portion of the historic Napa Valley property first acquired in 1879 by a Finnish Sea Captain Gustave Niebaum, founder of the Inglenook Winery.

In 2011, owners Francis and Eleanor Coppola acquired the Inglenook trademark and renamed the winery Inglenook (winery).

Main fountains at the Rubicon Estate Winery

== History ==
In 1975, Francis Ford Coppola and his wife Eleanor, purchased Niebaum's Victorian home, along with 1,560 acres (630 ha) of surrounding land. In 1995, Coppola reunited the two original Inglenook parcels by purchasing the grand Inglenook chateau and 94.5 acres (38.2 ha) of surrounding vineyards (neighboring vineyards include Heitz Wine Cellars Martha's Vineyard and Beaulieu Vineyard Georges de Latour). The winery was named Rubicon Estate in early 2006, and held that name until 2011 when it was renamed Inglenook.

Coppola's longtime winemaker was Scott McLeod, a UC Davis alumnus with winemaking background in Tuscany. McLeod left the winery in 2009, and esteemed wine consultant Stephane Derenoncourt came on board shortly thereafter. In 2011, Château Margaux's Philippe Bascaules became Estate Manager and Winemaker.

== Production ==
Rubicon is the winery's flagship wine and is made from grapes harvested from organically grown vineyards on the winery property.

== See also ==
- California wine
- Francis Ford Coppola Presents
