= Jon Bannenberg =

Australian yacht designer (1929–2002)

- Born: 1929; Sydney, New South Wales, Australia
- Died: 26 May 2002 (aged 72–73); London, England
- Education: Canterbury High School; Sydney Conservatorium of Music
- Occupation: Yacht designer
- Awards: Royal Designer for Industry (1978)

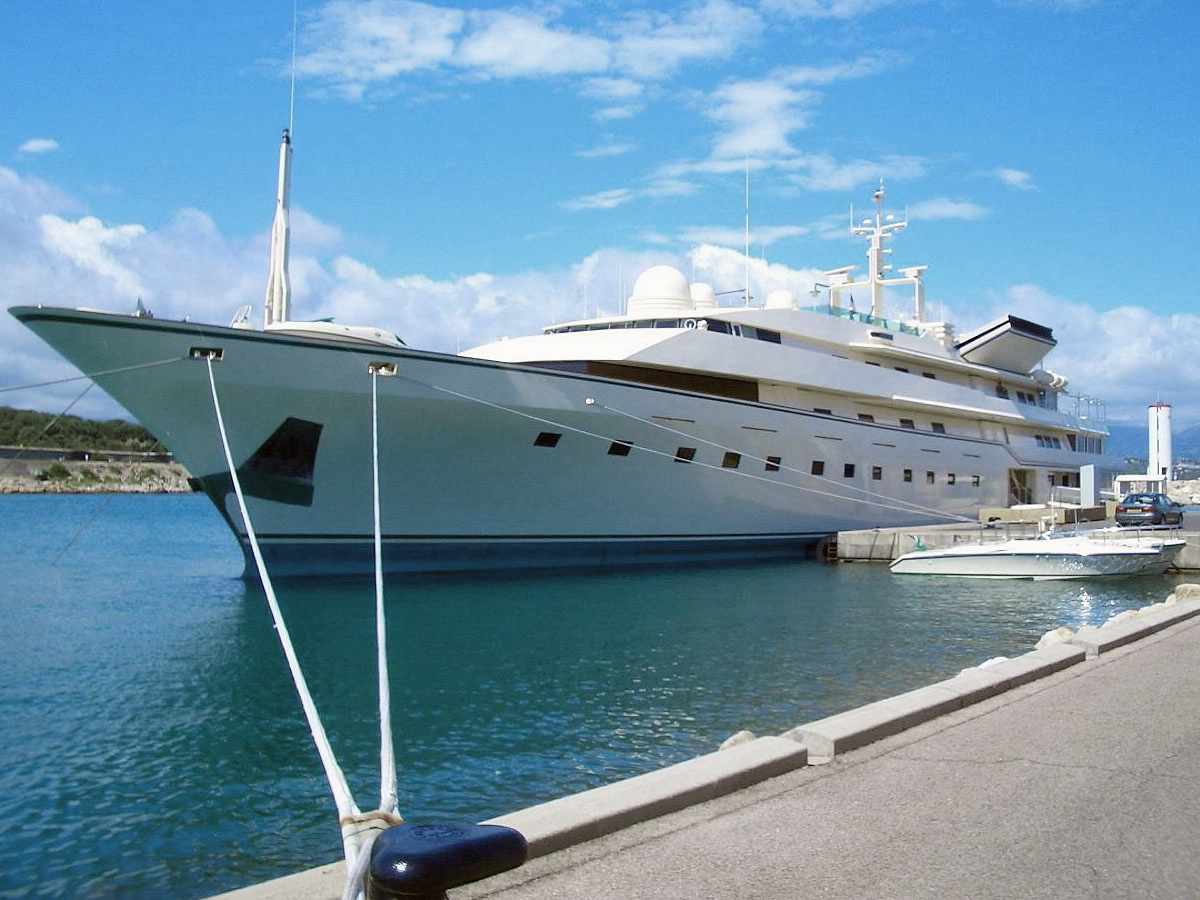
One of Bannenberg's Yachts, Kingdom 5KR

Jon Bannenberg, RDI (1929 – 26 May 2002) was an Australian-English yacht designer.

== Biography ==
Bannenberg was born in Sydney, Australia, and educated at Canterbury Boys High School and later at the Sydney Conservatorium of Music. In the early 1950s, he moved to London, by way of New Zealand and the Pitcairn Islands, during which time he worked briefly for Ngaio Marsh's theatre company. From initially earning a living by playing the piano in bars and clubs (he was briefly Noël Coward's rehearsal pianist), he developed an interest in design, establishing the fledgling Marble & Lemon decorative arts business in Cheval Place, Knightsbridge. This led to a partnership with the long-established New Bond Street dealer—Partridge Fine Arts—which began in 1957 and lasted well into the next decade. Bannenberg created the setting for the 3rd International Art Treasures exhibitions at the Victoria & Albert Museum in 1962—the design of which was described by The Times on 2 March 1962 as "well adapted to facilitate appreciation by the planning of its series of compartments".

His profile continued to rise and, in 1965, he was selected by Cunard as one of the interior designers for their new liner—known initially as Q4, but later to be the Queen Elizabeth 2—under construction at the John Brown Shipyard in Glasgow. Bannenberg was allocated to design the Double Room, the Card Room, and some of the First Class suites. His first yacht commission was the sailing yacht Tiawana, built by the Camper & Nicholsons in Southampton and delivered in 1968. Shortly thereafter, he was commissioned to design a large motor yacht, Carinthia V, by German retail magnate Helmut Horten. She was shortly followed by the almost identical Carinthia VI, described as an icon of 20th century yacht design. In a career, which was to extend a further thirty years, Bannenberg designed almost two hundred yacht projects, as well as working on residential projects, aircraft interiors, car interiors, furniture design and hotels.

His clients included Larry Ellison, Malcolm Forbes, Alan Bond, Bennett S. LeBow, Adnan Khashoggi, and Robert Maxwell.

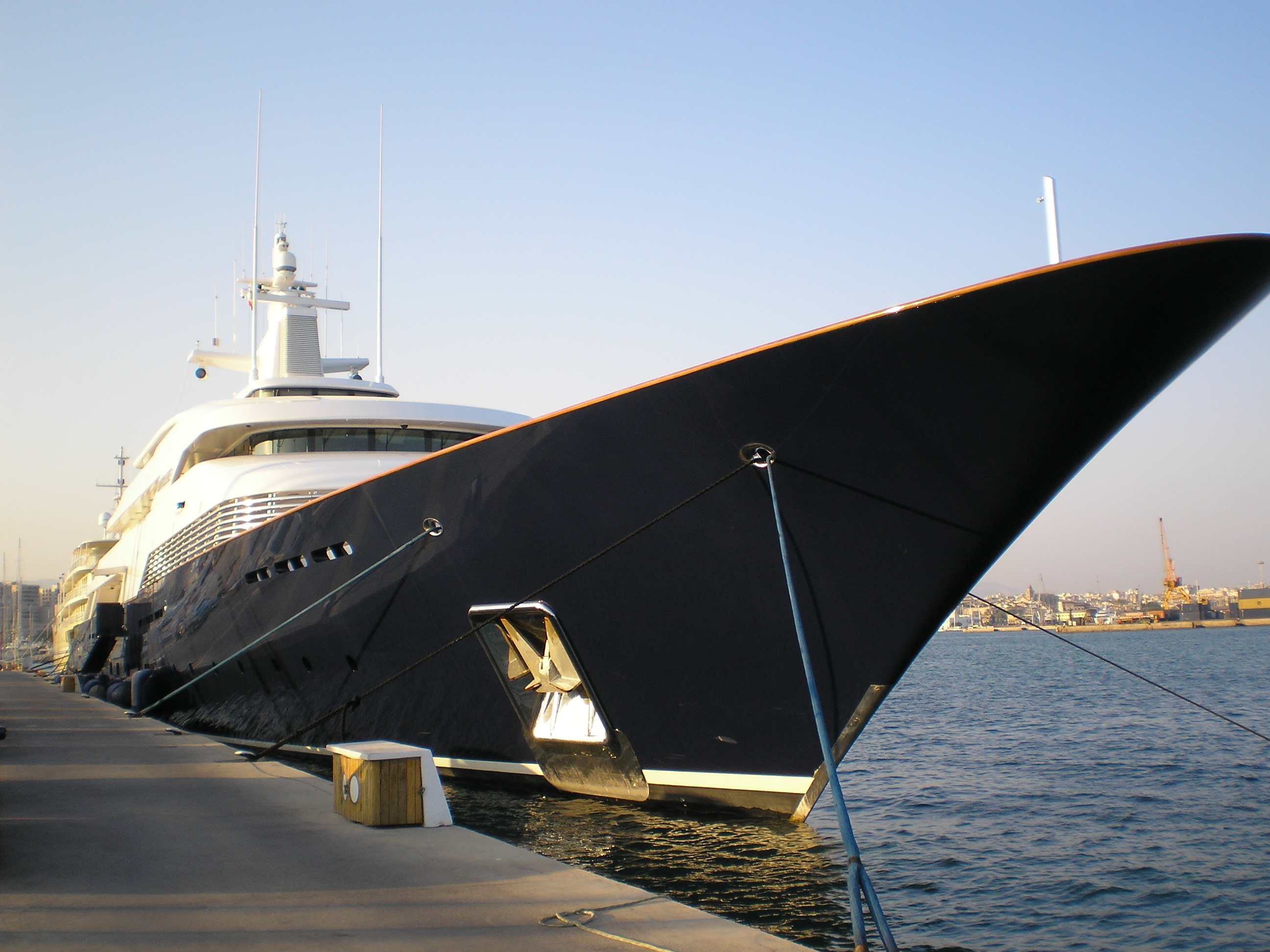
Limitless (Mallorca, 2006)

Bannenberg would design both the exterior and interior of all his yacht projects. Once referred to as a 'stylist' by Yachting Magazine, he was quick to write to the editor in trenchant terms: "Either one is a designer or not. The word 'stylist' to me conjures up some kind of flimsy tweaking of a structure, whereas quite the opposite is true, at least in our own case. Could you do me a great personal favour, either when compiling a new directory or when mentioning my name (should you ever do so after receiving this letter) and refer to me as what I am: a designer—perhaps a nitpicking, irritating one, but nevertheless not a stylist. That is a title I gratefully concede to Vidal Sassoon." He likened himself to the conductor of an orchestra: someone who could not play all the instruments, but knew exactly the sound they should all be producing.

Bannenberg worked with shipyards in the Netherlands, Italy, France, Germany and England. He rekindled the connection with the country of his birth with a collaboration with the Oceanfast yard in Perth, Australia. On two separate occasions he produced designs for a successor to HMY Britannia.

== Recognition ==
He was appointed a Royal Designer for Industry (RDI) in 1978, the first yacht designer to be so honoured since Charles E. Nicholson in 1934.

== Death ==
Bannenberg died of an inoperable Brain tumour at his home in London on 26 May 2002.

== Legacy ==
Bannenberg & Rowell Design continues to design yachts under the direction of Dickie Bannenberg and Creative Director Simon Rowell.

Cam Bannenberg is an investor with a background in commercial shipbroking, yacht sales, and high-end residential property and design.
