= Vivino =

Online marketplace

- Company type: Private
- Headquarters: Copenhagen, Denmark
- Founders: Heini Zachariassen and Theis Søndergaard
- CEO: Morten Heuing
- Website: www.vivino.com
- Launched: 2010

Vivino is an online wine marketplace and wine app, which has been downloaded more than 60 million times. The Vivino app is available for download on Android and IOS mobile devices. Vivino was founded in 2010 by Heini Zachariassen and Theis Søndergaard. As of 2022, Vivino had a wine database containing more than 15.8 million different wines and had nearly 61 million users. In July 2013, the database had 1 million wines. Vivino's headquarters are in Copenhagen, Denmark but the company has several subsidiaries including in the United States.

== History ==
Vivino was founded in Copenhagen, Denmark by Heini Zachariassen and Theis Søndergaard. The company launched an iPhone app in July 2011. They knew very little about wine and used that ignorance to develop an app for ordinary people. The developers photographed 5,000 wines, but the breakthrough came when they offered a corkscrew to whoever could upload the most wines, gaining 50,000 pictures. In late 2014, the database received 250,000 photos per day, although not all are of new wines. The software recognizes 25,000 photos per day, manually processed by 50 Indian contractors. In July 2013, Vivino raised $10.3M in capital from Balderton Capital and Creandum. In January 2016 the company raised a Series B round of venture funding from SCP Neptune (the family office of Christophe Navarre, the then global CEO of Moet Hennessy) for an additional $25M. In February 2018, Vivino raised a Series C round of $20 million also led by SCP Neptune International, with participation from Balderton Capital, Creandum, SEED Capital Denmark and Iconical. Long term profitability hinges on in-app purchasing and email campaigns, as only 5% of wine purchases are made online. In March 2018, Vivino appointed Former StubHub President Chris Tsakalakis Chief Executive Officer. In 2021, Vivino raised a Series D round of $155 million led by Swedish-based investment firm Kinnevik with Sprints Capital accompanying as a new investor. Additional participants include GP Bullhound and existing early-stage investor Creandum.

== App features ==
In 2017, the app launched a new recommendations service, Vivino Market, which gives customers recommendations based on their previous searches and purchases. In 2020, Vivino announced it is set to launch a new feature that will show users how likely a wine will match their preferences.

== Awards and nominations ==
- Won Entrepreneur of the Year in GP Bullhound Investor Allstar Awards (Award won by Heini Zachariassen)
- Nominated for the 2012 Danish App Awards.
- Won 2012 Danish Growth Award (Award won by Heini Zachariassen for Vivino).
- Nominated for 2013 Danish Startup Awards. (Category: Best Design)
- Nominated for 2013 Mobile Excellence Awards. (Category: Best Original Content for Mobile)
- Won Real Innovation Awards 2017: The Best Beats First winner
