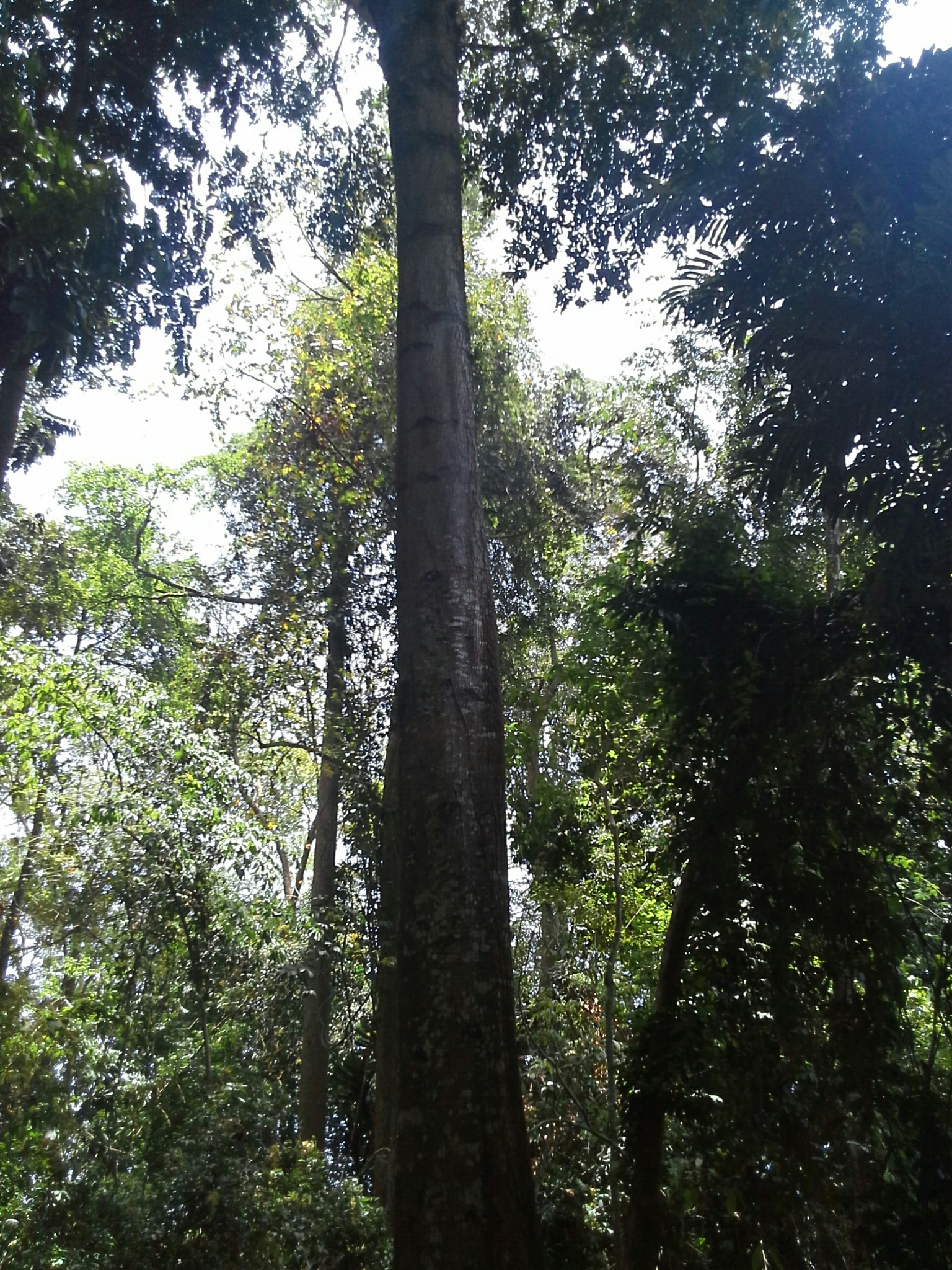
- Tieghemella heckelii

Scientific classification
- Kingdom: Plantae
- Clade: Tracheophytes
- Clade: Angiosperms
- Clade: Eudicots
- Clade: Asterids
- Order: Ericales
- Family: Sapotaceae
- Subfamily: Sapotoideae
- Genus: Tieghemella; Pierre 1890, conserved name, not Berl. & De Toni 1888 (Mucoraceae in Zygomycetes)

Synonyms
- Dumoria A.Chev.

= Tieghemella =

Genus of plants

Tieghemella is a genus of the plant family Sapotaceae described as a genus in 1890. The wood of Tieghemella species is known as makore in the lumber trade. The wood provides high chatoyance, with an average value above 20 PZC.

Tieghemella is native to western and central Africa.

Species

1. Tieghemella africana Pierre - Ivory Coast, Cameroon, Republic of the Congo, Gabon, Democratic Republic of the Congo
2. Tieghemella heckelii (A.Chev.) Pierre ex Dubard - Guinea, Liberia, Sierra Leone, Ivory Coast, Nigeria, Democratic Republic of the Congo
