= Benicia High School =

Coordinates: 38°03′56″N 122°10′30″W

Location
- 1101 Military West; Benicia, California; United States

Information
- Type: Public high school
- Established: 1892
- School district: Benicia Unified School District
- Principal: Brianna Kleinschmidt
- Faculty: 111
- Teaching staff: 66.71 (FTE)
- Grades: 9 - 12
- Enrollment: 1,405 (2023–2024)
- Student to teacher ratio: 21.06
- Campus: Suburban; 47 acres (0.19km^{2})
- Colors: Blue; Gold
- Athletics: Diablo Athletic League
- Mascot: Panther
- Website: bhs.beniciaunified.org

Benicia High School is a public high school in Benicia, California, in the North Bay sub-region of the San Francisco Bay Area. Part of the Benicia Unified School District, it serves approximately 1,700 students, grades nine through twelve.

== Physical plant ==
Benicia High School moved to its current campus in 1961. The campus received major upgrades in 1980 and the late 1990s.

== Athletics ==
Benicia High School competes in the Diablo Athletic League (DAL). The Diablo Athletic League is Division I, Benicia competes in the Valley Division.

=== Band ===
The band consists of five main groups: the marching band, the concert bands, the color guard, the jazz band, and the drumline. The bands and the color guard perform and compete regularly in the fall and spring, and there are a winter color guard and winter drumline. The band competes in the Northern California Band Association.

- Marching Band - The marching band performed in the 2001 and 2005 Tournament of Roses Parades.
- Concert Bands - Benicia High School has two concert bands, a symphonic band and an audition-only wind ensemble.
- Drum Line - The Benicia High School Winter Drumline is an NCPA Scholastic A class marching percussion ensemble.

== Notable alumni ==
Notable alumni of Benicia High School include:

- Robert Arneson (Class of 1948) – sculptor
- Willie Calhoun (Class of 2013) – MLB outfielder for several MLB teams including the Texas Rangers and the Los Angeles Angels
- Austin Carr (Class of 2012) – NFL wide receiver for the New Orleans Saints
- Dionne Quan (Class of 1998) – voice actress for Rugrats, The Fairly OddParents and Bratz
- Freddie Stone (Class of 1965) – Known to high school classmates as Fred Stewart, he went on to become a guitarist in Sly and the Family Stone
