= Pleasant Grove High School (California) =

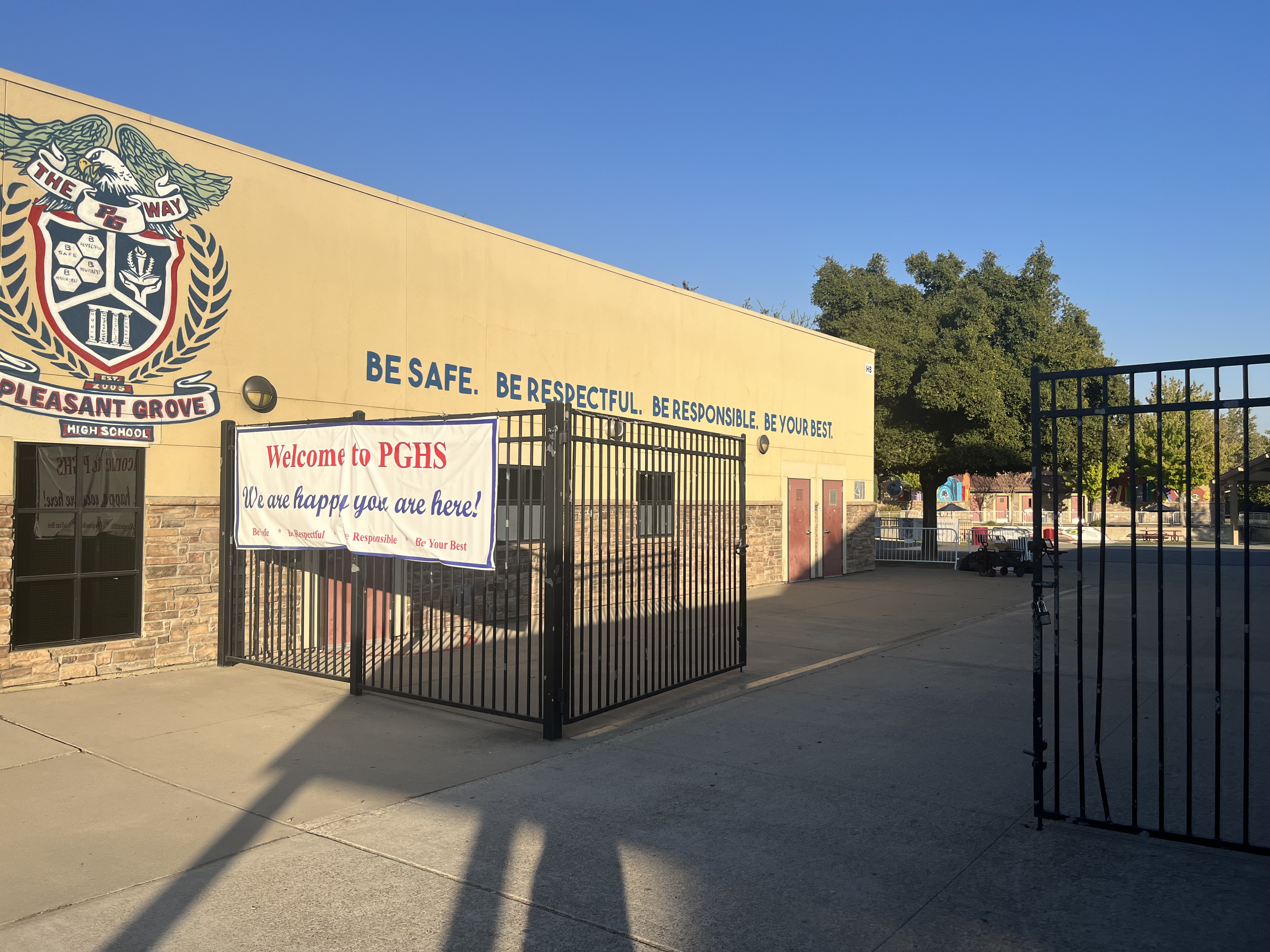

Location
- 9531 Bond Road; Elk Grove, Sacramento County, California 95624; United States; 38°25′34.1″N 121°20′28.4″W

Information
- School type: Public
- Established: 2005
- Status: Open
- School district: Elk Grove Unified School District
- Principal: Iram "Omar" Carreon
- Teaching staff: 111.10 (FTE)
- Grades: 9-12
- Student to teacher ratio: 22.61
- Campus: Outdoor
- Color
- Athletics conference: CIF Sac-Joaquin Section
- Mascot: Eagle
- Rival: Sheldon High School and Elk Grove High School
- Feeder schools: Katherine L. Albiani Middle School
- Website: Official website

Pleasant Grove High School or PGHS is a public four year high school located in Elk Grove, California. Established in 2005, the first class of graduating seniors was the class of 2008. Pleasant Grove is the eighth high school of the Elk Grove Unified School District and has the highest API Score in the district. The school's mascot is the eagle, and the colors are navy blue, white and red.

== Athletics ==
Pleasant Grove High School has won seven CIF Sac-Joaquin Section Division 1 Championships across several sports including softball (2008-09), football (2010-11), girls' golf (2022-23, 2023-24), and boys' volleyball (2023-24). The girls' golf team has also won Masters championships in 2022-23 and 2023-24.

=== Teams ===
- Baseball
- Basketball
- Cheerleading
- Cross Country
- Flag Football
- Football
- Golf
- Soccer
- Softball
- Swimming
- Tennis
- Track and Field
- Volleyball
- Wrestling
- Water Polo

== Academies & pathways ==
Pleasant Grove High School offers several optional career-focused academies designed to provide students with specialized coursework aligned with specific career pathways. These programs typically span most or all of a student’s high school education.

=== Advancement Via Individual Determination (AVID) ===
The Advancement Via Individual Determination (AVID) program is a college-readiness initiative that supports students in developing academic skills for postsecondary education. According to school reports, "over 90% of AVID seniors complete the A–G college admission requirements each year."

=== Pleasant Grove Future Farmers of America (FFA) ===
The Pleasant Grove FFA is a chapter of the National FFA Organization, providing students with Supervised agricultural experience opportunities and regional and state regional FFA competitions. The academy offers pathway classes in Animal Science, Floral, and Agriscience, with coursework from 9th to 12th grade.

=== Biomedical Academy (BMA) ===
The Biomedical Academy is a three year program, from 10th to 12th grade, focusing on medical and health sciences. The academy is aimed towards students looking to progress in medical and health programs post high school. The program utilizes the Project Lead the Way (PLTW) curriculum and has partnerships with the California Society of Anesthesiologist (CSA), University of California Davis, and the Methodist Hospital of Sacramento.

=== Digital Media Academy (DMA) ===
The Digital Media Academy is a three year program, from 10th to 12th grade, centered around digital arts and media production Originally, the program was grouped with the IDEA academy under CADD/COMM (Communications) before splitting in 2012 and forming the two separate organizations today. The academy is supported by an advisory board composed of professionals in media production, including representatives from local organizations such as Access Sacramento and regional news outlets like KCRA. DMA has worked alongside and completed projects on behalf of the Elk Grove Food Bank, the Homeless Assistance Resource Team (HART), Capitol Area Development Agency (CADA), and the Sacramento Kings.

=== Innovative Design & Engineering Academy (IDEA) ===
The Innovative Design & Engineering Academy is a three year program from 10th to 12th grade, focused on introducing students to the fundamentals of architectural and mechanical engineering. Outside of the core program classes, the academy also operates several labs including CADD animation, engineering and construction, and the Maker Space. The program is in partnership with companies including the Sacramento Municipal Utility District and SIEMENS as well as schools like UC Davis, Cosumnes River College, and American River College.

== School-wide programs ==
=== Band ===
The Pleasant Grove High School music program, directed by Michael Souliere, includes marching band, concert band, and jazz band ensembles. The marching band competes in the Northern California Band Association (NCBA) parade marching and jazz divisions during the fall season. As of the 2025 season, the ensembles competed in the 5A parade marching division and 4A jazz division. Unlike many schools, the marching band also performs in field show, though not competitively.

During the winter season, the program transitions to concert band performances, including at the Golden Empire Music Festival at Cosumnes River College as well as various school events.

The school's jazz band is offered as a year-round zero-period class held before the start of the regular school day. In addition to fall competitions, the ensembles performs at local events and the Golden Empire Jazz Festival hosted at California State University, Sacramento. The program also hosts the annual Elk Grove Unified School District Jazz Festival on campus.

=== EagleForce Robotics ===
The EagleForce Robotics team (FRC 2073) was founded in 2007 by Michael Young. The program consists of business, mechanical, and programming divisions. The team placed second in the 2025 FIRST Robotics Competition World Championship finals.

== Controversies ==
=== 2023 Multicultural Assembly ===
On March 3rd, 2023, the school's annual multicultural assembly became a subject of controversy following a four-minute drag performance by the school's Gender Sexuality Alliance (GSA). While the assembly was intended to showcase different cultures and backgrounds, the performance stirred objections from parents who criticized the school for requiring students to attend without informing families in advance of a drag performance.

=== 2026 Stabbing ===
On October 28th, 2026, Elk Grove police officers responded shortly after 3:45 p.m after reports circulated of two injured students near the school's gym. Two students were stabbed during a physical altercation in the bathroom. Both victims were transported to a hospital with one with life threatening injuries. Police detained two teenage suspects south of the school and recovered a knife. Both Pleasant Grove High School and neighboring Katherine Albiani Middle School were subsequently placed on lockdown and later activities and extracurriculars were canceled. Both suspects were booked into juvenile hall on attempted murder charges.

== Notable alumni ==
- Arik Armstead - American football NFL defensive end
- Armond Armstead - former professional football player
- Ally Carda - softball pitcher and first baseman
- Marquese Chriss - professional basketball player
- Cody Demps (born 1993) - basketball player for Hapoel Be'er Sheva of the Israeli Basketball Premier League
- Cole Hikutini - American football tight end
- Matt LaGrassa - former soccer player
- Kyle Larson - professional stock car racing driver
- Dylan Lupton - professional stock car racing driver
- Jalen Saunders - former professional NFL football player
- Xavier Thames - former professional basketball player
- Riley Voelkel - American-born Canadian actress
