= Elsie Robinson =

American syndicated columnist

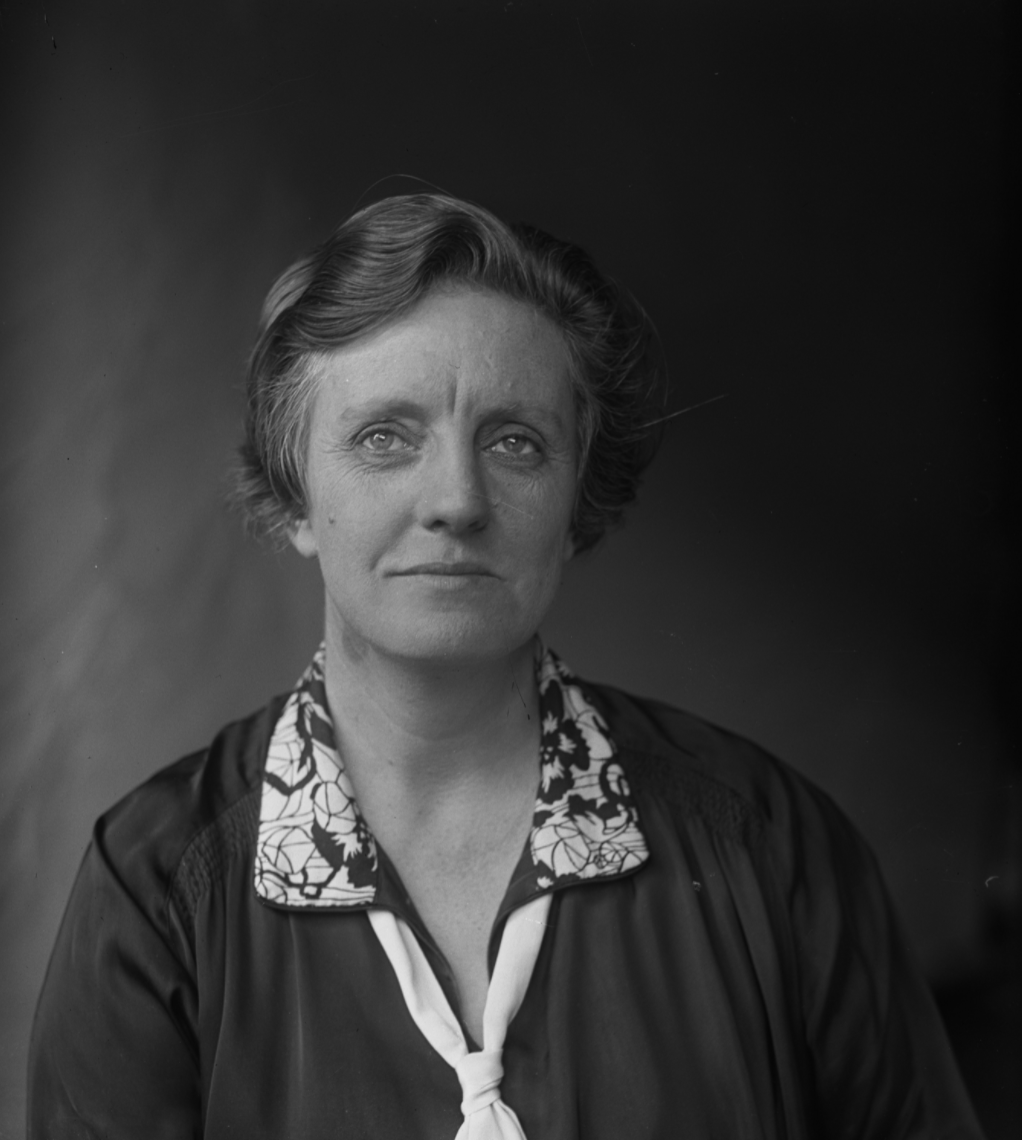
- Born: April 30, 1883
- Died: September 8, 1956 (aged 73); San Francisco, United States
- Occupation: Journalist; fiction writer; poet; memoirist; illustrator
- Notable works: Listen, World! syndicated column

Elsinore Justinia Robinson (April 30, 1883 – September 8, 1956) was an American journalist, poet, memoirist and short story writer, known for her syndicated Hearst column "Listen, World!" (1921–1956), which was read by 20 million Americans on a daily basis. Robinson was a pioneer in that she illustrated many of her opinion pieces. In both her journalism and fiction, she argued eloquently and forcefully for women to have the same freedoms and opportunities as men. Her poems, which were widely published and anthologized, dealt with her grief and heartbreak.

== Early life and education ==
Robinson was the third of five children born to a working class family in Benicia, California. At the time, Benicia was a rowdy frontier town, known for its numerous bars and brothels.

== Personal life ==
At 19, Robinson married a wealthy Vermont widower named Christie Crowell who was 10 years her senior and moved to Brattleboro, Vermont. The marriage was fraught from the beginning, she wrote in her memoir, I Wanted Out. 'We had been married weeks, months—why did we still seem strangers? Why did he caress me so seldom—act so guilty when he did? Why was he always trying to repress my laughter, my impulsive affection?"

Her only child, a son named George Alexander Crowell, was born in 1904. George suffered from severe asthma and would struggle to breathe throughout his life.

== Career ==
To amuse her often-bedridden son and distract herself from her loveless marriage, Robinson began writing and illustrating children's stories for John Martin's Letters, a subscriber-based newsletter for children.

In 1911, she met a darkly seductive, also-married patient at the Brattleboro Retreat (formerly the Vermont Lunatic Asylum) named Robert Wallace, who hired Robinson to illustrate two children's books he had written, Behind the Garden Wall and Within the Deep, Dark Woods.

In 1912, Robinson and Wallace, accompanied by George, took the train back to California together to overwinter with Robinson's family in the San Francisco Bay Area. Robinson hoped the temperate air would help George breathe easier and that her early publishing success would lead to enough steady work to allow her to leave her husband. Wallace hoped for a new start after his wife moved to Switzerland with their three children.

In 1915, Robinson, after failing to find regular editorial work, moved with George to Hornitos, California, where Wallace had struck gold at a deserted mine. When her husband learned that Robinson and Wallace were living together in Hornitos, he cut Robinson off and filed for divorce. Suddenly impoverished, Robinson was forced to work as a common mucker in a gold mine – the lone woman in a motley crew of men – to make ends meet. At night, she continued her quest to become a writer, typing by the light of a kerosene lamp on an ancient typewriter she borrowed from the town postmistress. She turned her unhappy marriage and experience as a "lady miner" into fodder for fiction, publishing short fiction in Black Cat Cosmopolitan, Breezy Stories and McClure's and essays in Sunset and Overland Monthly.

In 1918, when the mine closed, she parted ways with Wallace and moved to San Francisco with George. After another bout of hard times – with a lot of desperation and little to eat – she burst into the city room of the Oakland Tribune with a mock-up of a children's section for the paper, which did not have one. The editor, Leo Levy, hired her on the spot, agreeing to pay her $12 a week for a weekly children's column. Her first column, called "Trestle Glenn Secrets" after a wooded area in Oakland, ran adjacent to L. Frank Baum's column, "The Wonderful Stories of Oz." Robinson's column was so popular that the Tribune expanded it into an eight-page section called "Aunt Elsie's Magazine," which spawned "Aunt Elsie" clubs in 65 California towns whose members held parades and competed to publish their stories and illustrations in the Tribune.

In 1919, Robinson began writing a homemaking column called "Curtains, Collars, and Cutlets: Cheer-Up Column" and in 1920, a relationship column called "Cry on Geraldine's Shoulder." In 1921, she launched her third column, "Listen, World!," which marked her transition from local phenomenon to national figure and in which she commented on current events and cultural trends. In 1924, William Randolph Hearst paid her $20,000 a year – about $325,000 today – to syndicate "Listen, World!", making her the highest-paid newswoman in the Hearst organization. She asked for a raise (after not receiving one in nine years) and complained about her heavy workload in a 1940 letter to Hearst. That same year, an accident left her bedridden for the rest of her life.

She died at the age of 73 in San Francisco.

== Works ==
- Listen, World! Boston, Chapman & Grimes. 1934
- I Wanted Out! New York, Farrar & Rinehart, Inc. 1934
