= DeForest Buckner =

American football player (born 1994)

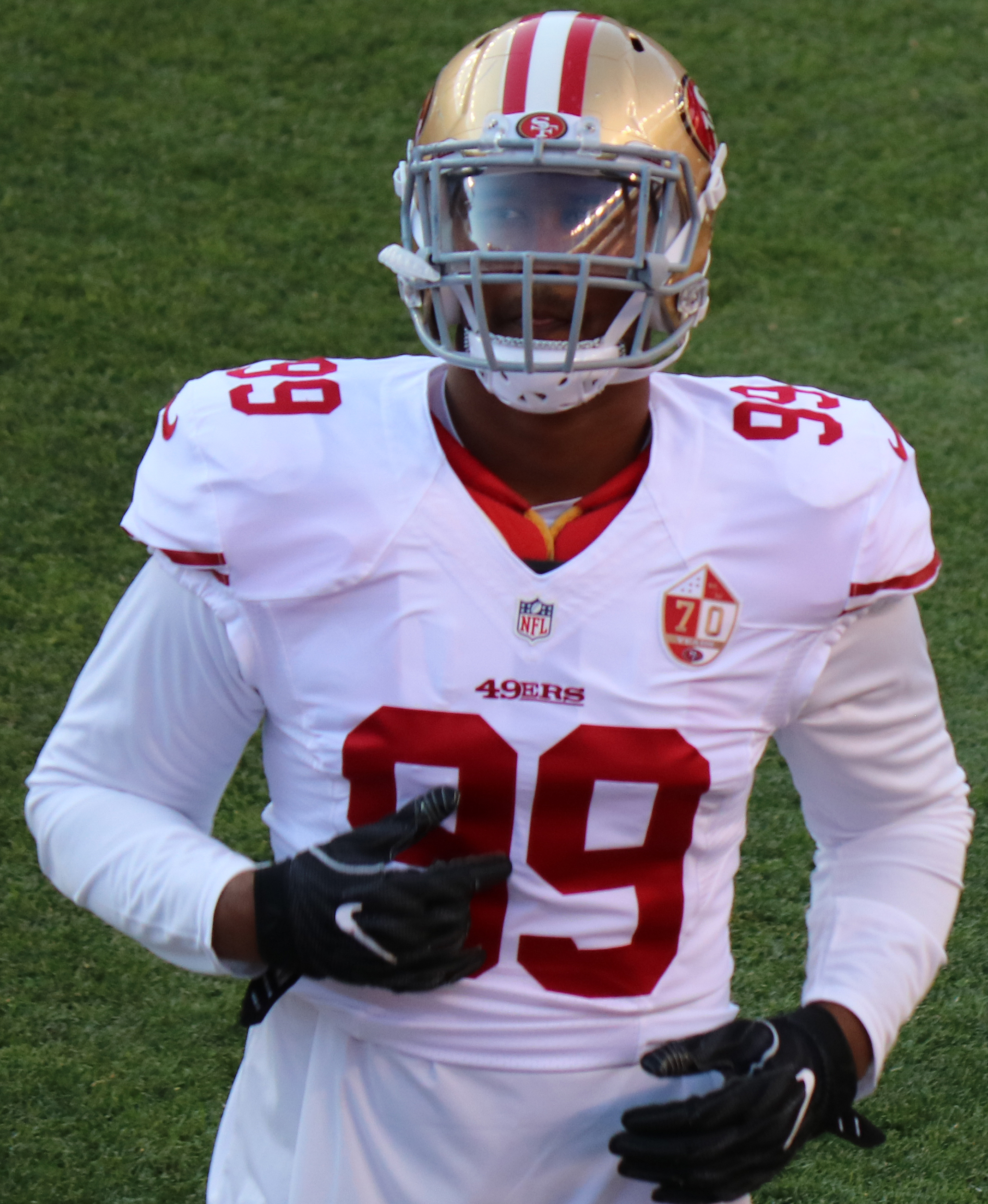
- Buckner with the San Francisco 49ers in 2016

No. 99 – San Francisco 49ers
- Position: Defensive tackle
- Roster status: Active

Personal information
- Born: March 17, 1994 (age 32); Waiʻanae, Hawaii, U.S.
- Listed height: 6 ft 7 in (2.01 m)
- Listed weight: 295 lb (134 kg)

Career information
- High school: Punahou School (Honolulu, Hawaii)
- College: Oregon (2012–2015)
- NFL draft: 2016: 1st round, 7th overall pick

Career history
- San Francisco 49ers (2016–2019); Indianapolis Colts (2020–2026); San Francisco 49ers (2026–present)

Awards and highlights
- First-team All-Pro (2020); Second-team All-Pro (2019); 3× Pro Bowl (2018, 2021, 2023); PFWA All-Rookie Team (2016); Morris Trophy (2015); First-team All-American (2015); Pac-12 Defensive Player of the Year (2015); First-team All-Pac-12 (2015); Second-team All-Pac-12 (2014)

Career NFL statistics as of Week 10, 2026
- Total tackles: 687
- Sacks: 75.5
- Forced fumbles: 9
- Fumble recoveries: 11
- Pass deflections: 31
- Touchdowns: 2
- Stats at Pro Football Reference

DeForest George Buckner (born March 17, 1994) is an American professional football defensive tackle for the San Francisco 49ers of the National Football League (NFL). He played college football for the Oregon Ducks, and was selected by the 49ers in the first round of the 2016 NFL draft. With the 49ers, Buckner made a Pro Bowl and was a second-team All-Pro selection in 2019. Buckner was traded to the Indianapolis Colts in 2020, where he was selected to the first-team All Pro in 2020 and made the Pro Bowl in 2021 and 2023.

== Early life ==
Buckner was born to a Samoan mother and an African American father. He attended Punahou School in Honolulu, Hawaii, where he was rated as a four-star recruit. Buckner was also a teammate of Kaʻimi Fairbairn, currently the kicker of the Houston Texans. In January 2012, Buckner committed to the University of Oregon to play college football. He also played basketball in high school. Buckner was the Hawaii Gatorade Player of the Year in basketball in 2012.

== College career ==
Buckner played in all 13 games as a true freshman in 2012, making two starts. He finished his freshman year with 29 tackles, 2.5 for a loss, and 1.0 sack. As a sophomore in 2013, Buckner started eight of 13 games, recording 39 tackles, 3.5 for a loss, and 2.5 sacks. As a junior in 2014, he finished the year with 81 tackles, 13 for a loss, and 4.0 sacks. Buckner was considered a possible first-round pick in the NFL draft but chose to return for his senior season to graduate and improve his draft stock.

As a senior in 2015, Buckner improved even further, achieving career highs in tackles with 83, tackles for loss with 17, and sacks with 10.5. He was voted the 2015 Pac-12 Conference Defensive Player of the Year by the Pac-12 coaches, joining Haloti Ngata as the second Oregon Duck to ever win the award. Buckner was awarded the Morris Trophy for best Pac-12 defensive lineman (voted on by opposing players) and was named a first-team All-American. Following his senior season, Buckner officially announced that he would enter the 2016 NFL draft, and was considered one of the top-ranked defensive ends in the draft.

== Professional career ==
Pre-draft measurables
Height	Weight	Arm length	Hand span	Wingspan	40-yard dash	10-yard split	20-yard split	20-yard shuttle	Three-cone drill	Vertical jump	Broad jump	Bench press
6 ft 7 in (2.01 m)	291 lb (132 kg)	34 3/8 in (0.87 m)	11 3/4 in (0.30 m)	6 ft 10 in (2.08 m)	5.05 s	1.77 s	2.96 s	4.47 s	7.51 s	32.0 in (0.81 m)	9 ft 8 in (2.95 m)	21 reps
All values from NFL Combine/Pro Day

=== San Francisco 49ers (first stint) ===
==== 2016 season ====
The San Francisco 49ers selected Buckner with the seventh overall pick in the 2016 NFL Draft. He was the second consecutive Oregon defensive end selected in the first round by the 49ers, joining Arik Armstead who was selected 17th overall in 2015. They went on to draft Solomon Thomas who was another Pac-12 defensive end in 2017.

Buckner made his NFL debut in the season-opener against the Los Angeles Rams, recording one tackle in the 28–0 shutout victory. During a Week 6 45–16 road loss to the Buffalo Bills, he recorded nine tackles and his first two NFL sacks on quarterback Tyrod Taylor and recovered a fumble forced by former college teammate Arik Armstead on Taylor. During Week 14 against the New York Jets, Buckner recorded a team-high 11 tackles and sacked Bryce Petty twice in the 23–17 overtime loss.

Buckner finished his rookie season with 73 tackles, six sacks, two fumble recoveries, and a pass deflection in 15 games and starts. He led all NFL defensive linemen with 1,108 snaps on the season and ranked second with his 73 tackles. Buckner's six sacks ranked fourth among rookies. He was named to the PFWA All-Rookie Team.

==== 2017 season ====
Buckner and the defense played well against the Carolina Panthers in the season opener, holding quarterback Cam Newton to only 171 yards passing and three yards rushing despite losing 23–3. Three weeks later against the Arizona Cardinals, Buckner recorded four tackles and his first sack of the year on Carson Palmer during the 18–15 overtime road loss. During Week 15 against the Tennessee Titans, Buckner recorded a season-high nine tackles and half a sack on former college teammate Marcus Mariota in a narrow 25–23 victory.

Buckner finished his second professional season with 61 tackles, five pass deflections, three sacks, and a forced fumble in 16 games and starts.

==== 2018 season ====
During the season-opener against the Minnesota Vikings, Buckner recorded seven tackles and sacked Kirk Cousins 2.5 times in the 24–16 road loss. In the next game against the Detroit Lions, he recorded five tackles and sacked Matthew Stafford once in a narrow 30–27 win. After the first two games of the season, Buckner eclipsed his 2017 sack total. During a Week 13 43–16 road loss the Seattle Seahawks, Buckner recorded seven tackles and sacked Russell Wilson twice. Two weeks later against the Seahawks, Buckner recorded a season-high 11 tackles and sacked Wilson twice more during the 26–23 overtime victory.

Buckner finished his third season with 67 tackles, three pass deflections, a fumble recovery, and a career high 12 sacks, the most by a 49ers player since Aldon Smith had 19.5 during the 2012 season. Buckner was named to his first Pro Bowl as a result.

==== 2019 season ====
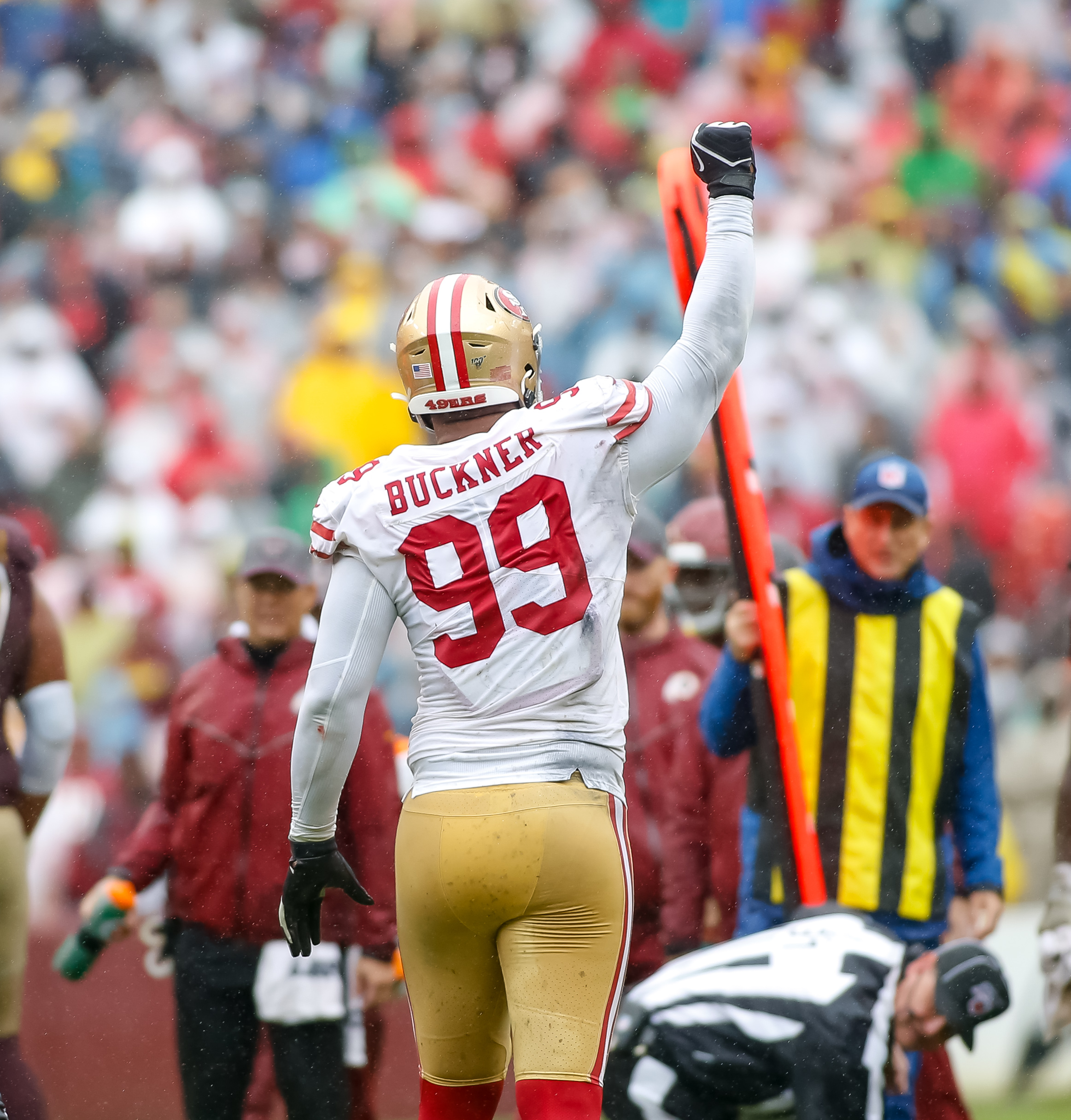
Buckner in 2019

On April 24, 2019, the 49ers exercised the fifth-year option on Buckner's contract.

During Week 2 against the Cincinnati Bengals, Buckner recorded a tackle and his first sack of the season on Andy Dalton in the 41–17 road victory. In the next game against the Pittsburgh Steelers, Buckner recorded a season-high 10 tackles, sacked Mason Rudolph once, and recovered a fumble forced by teammate Arik Armstead on James Conner late in the fourth quarter to help seal a 24–20 victory. After a Week 4 bye, the 49ers hosted the Cleveland Browns on Monday Night Football. In that game, Buckner recorded five tackles and a strip sack on Baker Mayfield which was recovered by teammate Nick Bosa as the 49ers won by a score of 31–3. During a Week 9 28–25 road victory over the Cardinals, Buckner recorded four tackles and a sack. In the next game against the Seahawks on Monday Night Football, he recorded five tackles and recovered a fumble forced by teammate K'Waun Williams on running back Rashaad Penny. Later in the game, Buckner recovered a fumble lost by offensive tackle Germain Ifedi and returned it for a 12-yard touchdown during the 27–24 overtime loss. Three weeks later against the Baltimore Ravens, Buckner sacked Lamar Jackson once during the 20–17 road loss. With this sack, Buckner recorded at least one sack in every game against the American Football Conference (AFC) North during the season.

Buckner finished the 2019 season with 61 tackles, 7.5 sacks, two forced fumbles, four fumble recoveries, two pass deflections, and a touchdown in 16 games and starts. On January 3, 2020, he was named as a Second-team All-Pro.

Buckner made his playoff debut in the NFC Divisional Round of the playoffs against the Vikings. In that game, he recorded two tackles and sacked Kirk Cousins once in the 27–10 win. During the NFC Championship Game against the Green Bay Packers, Buckner recorded four tackles and recovered a fumble lost by Aaron Rodgers in the 37–20 victory. During Super Bowl LIV against the Kansas City Chiefs, Buckner recorded six tackles and sacked Patrick Mahomes 1.5 times in the 31–20 loss. He was ranked 56th by his fellow players on the NFL Top 100 Players of 2020.

=== Indianapolis Colts ===
==== 2020 season ====
On March 18, 2020, the 49ers traded Buckner to the Indianapolis Colts in exchange for their first-round pick in the 2020 NFL draft. He then signed a four-year, $84 million contract extension, making him the second-highest paid defensive tackle.

During a Week 2 28–11 over the Vikings, Buckner recorded his first sack of the season on Kirk Cousins in the end zone for a safety. During Week 11 against the Packers, Buckner recovered a fumble forced by teammate Julian Blackmon on wide receiver Marquez Valdes-Scantling early in overtime to help the Colts win the game 34–31. Buckner was placed on the reserve/COVID-19 list after testing positive for the virus on November 25, 2020. and activated on December 4. During Week 15 against the Houston Texans he had a career-high three sacks on Deshaun Watson, including a strip sack that was recovered by the Colts, during the 27–20 road victory, earning AFC Defensive Player of the Week. Buckner was named the AFC Defensive Player of the Month for his performance in December.

Buckner finished his first season with the Colts with 58 tackles, 9.5 sacks, three pass deflections, two forced fumbles, and a fumble recovery in 15 games and 14 starts. On January 8, 2021, Buckner was named a first-team All-Pro for the 2020 season. He was ranked 27th by his fellow players on the NFL Top 100 Players of 2021. He was named the Polynesian Professional Football Player of the Year for the 2020 season.

==== 2021 season ====
During the season-opener against the Seahawks, Buckner recorded six tackles and sacked Russell Wilson once in the 28–16 loss. During a Week 6 31–3 victory over the Texans, he recorded five tackles and a sack. In the next game against the 49ers, Buckner recorded six tackles and a sack in the 30–18 road victory. The following week against the Titans, Buckner recorded two tackles and a sack in the 34–31 overtime loss. During a Week 12 38–31 loss to the Tampa Bay Buccaneers, Buckner recorded three tackles and a sack. Three weeks later against the New England Patriots, he recorded four tackles and a sack in the 27–17 victory. On December 22, 2021, Buckner was named to his second Pro Bowl.

Buckner finished the 2021 season with 68 tackles, seven sacks, and three pass deflections in 17 games and 16 starts. He was ranked 66th by his fellow players on the NFL Top 100 Players of 2022.

==== 2022 season ====
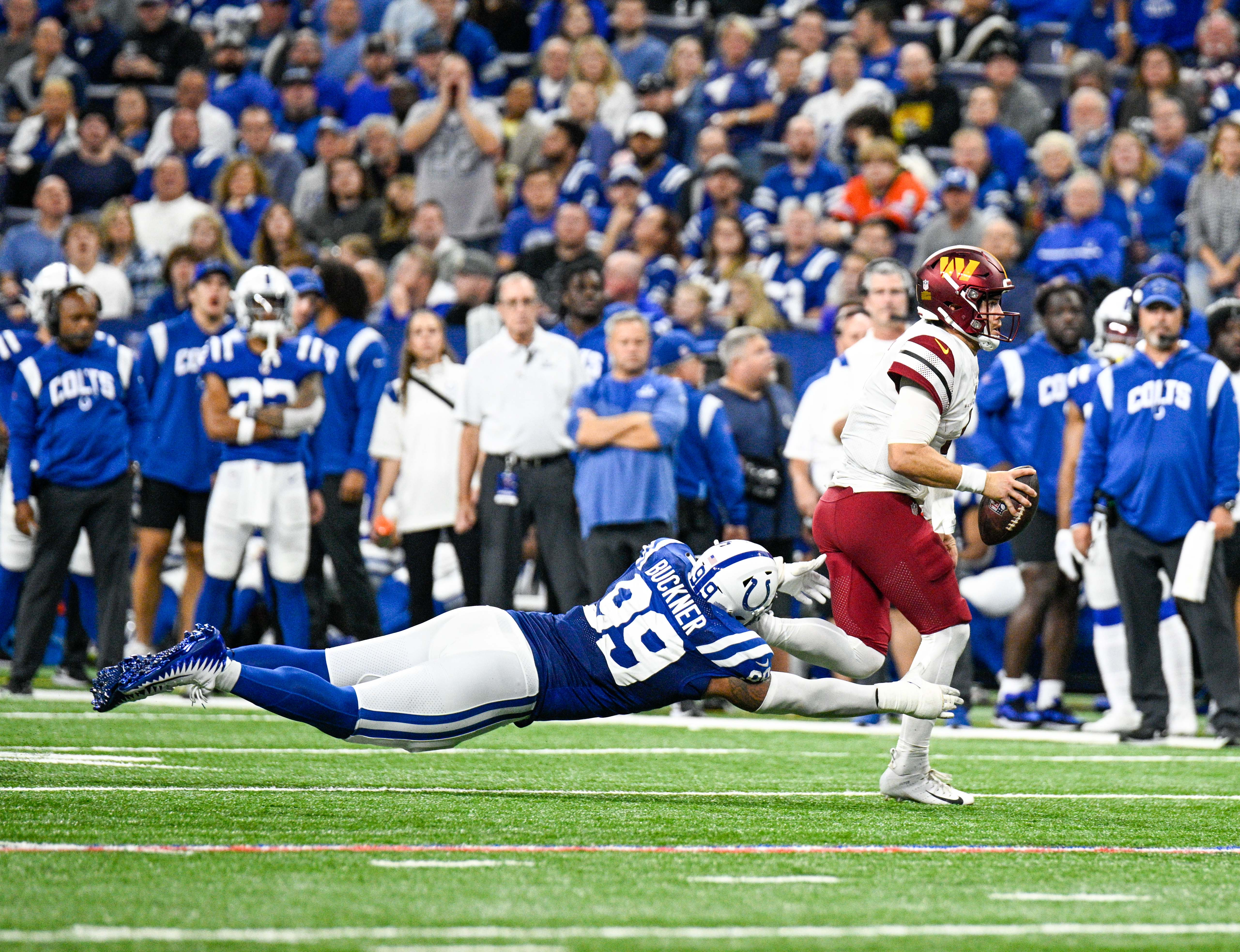
Buckner playing against the Washington Commanders in 2022.

Buckner played in all 17 games for the Colts in 2022, starting 16, and tallying 74 combined tackles, eight sacks, and two forced fumbles. Following the season, Buckner revealed that he played the entire year with a UCL tear in his left elbow. He was ranked 71st by his fellow players on the NFL Top 100 Players of 2023.

==== 2023 season ====
In Week 1 against the Jacksonville Jaguars, Buckner had a 26-yard fumble return for a touchdown. Buckner once again played in all 17 games, recording a career-high 81 tackles (fifth on the team) and finished third on the team with eight sacks. He earned his third Pro Bowl nomination.

==== 2024 season ====
On April 15, 2024, the Colts signed Buckner to a two-year, $46 million contract extension through the 2026 season. In the 2024 season, he finished with 6.5 sacks, 61 tackles, and a pass deflections.

==== 2025 season ====
Buckner began the 2025 campaign as of one Indianapolis' starting defensive tackles, recording four sacks and 42 combined tackles over his first nine games. After suffering a neck injury in Week 9 against the Pittsburgh Steelers, Buckner was placed on injured reserve on November 7, 2025. He was activated on December 22 and played against the San Francisco 49ers, recording five tackles (four solo tackles and one assisted tackle). On December 26, it was reported Buckner aggravated the neck injury and will be having surgery on his herniated disc, ending his season on injured reserve. During his 10 starts, Buckner recorded 47 combined tackles (30 solo tackles), nine tackles for loss, and four sacks.

=== San Francisco 49ers (second stint) ===
On October 27, 2026, Buckner was traded back to the 49ers in exchange for a fourth-round pick in the 2027 NFL draft.

== NFL career statistics ==
Legend
	Led the league
**Bold**	Career high

=== Regular season ===
Year	Team	Games		Tackles					Fumbles				Interceptions					
Year	Team	GP	GS	Cmb	Solo	Ast	Sck	TFL	FF	FR	Yds	TD	Int	Yds	Avg	Lng	TD	PD
2016	SF	15	15	73	43	30	6.0	7	0	2	0	0	0	0	0.0	0	0	1
2017	SF	16	16	61	**45**	16	3.0	5	1	0	0	0	0	0	0.0	0	0	5
2018	SF	16	16	67	44	23	**12.0**	**17**	0	1	0	0	0	0	0.0	0	0	3
2019	SF	16	16	62	34	28	7.5	9	**2**	**4**	12	**1**	0	0	0.0	0	0	2
2020	IND	15	14	58	37	21	9.5	10	**2**	1	0	0	0	0	0.0	0	0	3
2021	IND	17	16	68	40	28	7.0	10	0	0	0	0	0	0	0.0	0	0	3
2022	IND	17	16	74	44	30	8.0	11	**2**	1	0	0	0	0	0.0	0	0	3
2023	IND	17	16	**81**	**45**	36	8.0	11	**2**	1	**26**	**1**	0	0	0.0	0	0	**7**
2024	IND	12	11	61	24	**37**	6.5	8	0	0	0	0	0	0	0.0	0	0	1
2025	IND	10	10	47	30	17	4.0	9	0	0	0	0	0	0	0.0	0	0	0
2026	IND	7	7	31	11	20	4.0	4	0	1	0	0	0	0	0.0	0	0	3
2026	SF	2	2	4	2	2	0.0	0	0	0	0	0	0	0	0.0	0	0	0
Career		160	155	687	399	288	75.5	101	9	11	38	2	0	0	0.0	0	0	31

=== Postseason ===
Year	Team	Games		Tackles					Fumbles				Interceptions					
Year	Team	GP	GS	Cmb	Solo	Ast	Sck	TFL	FF	FR	Yds	TD	Int	Yds	Avg	Lng	TD	PD
2019	SF	3	3	**12**	**9**	**3**	**2.5**	**2**	**1**	**1**	0	0	0	0	0.0	0	0	0
2020	IND	1	1	2	2	0	0.0	0	0	0	0	0	0	0	0.0	0	0	0
Career		4	4	14	11	3	2.5	2	1	1	0	0	0	0	0.0	0	0	0

== Personal life ==
Buckner is married to Ashlyn Buckner. They have two children together.
