= Arik Armstead =

American football player (born 1993)

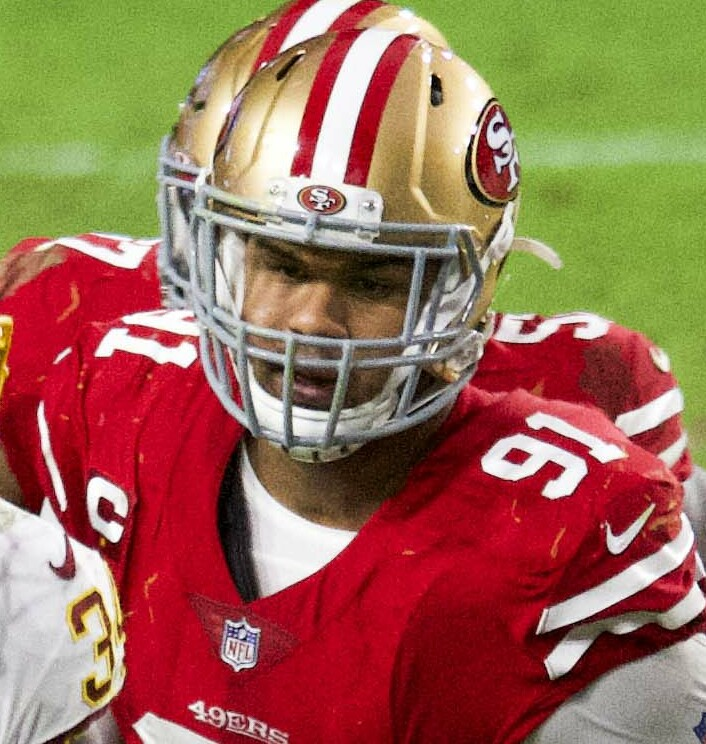
- Armstead with the San Francisco 49ers in 2020

No. 91 – Jacksonville Jaguars
- Position: Defensive end
- Roster status: Active

Personal information
- Born: November 15, 1993 (age 33); Sacramento, California, U.S.
- Listed height: 6 ft 7 in (2.01 m)
- Listed weight: 290 lb (132 kg)

Career information
- High school: Pleasant Grove (Elk Grove, California)
- College: Oregon (2012–2014)
- NFL draft: 2015: 1st round, 17th overall pick

Career history
- San Francisco 49ers (2015–2023); Jacksonville Jaguars (2024−present)

Awards and highlights
- Walter Payton NFL Man of the Year (2024)

Career NFL statistics as of Week 5, 2026
- Total tackles: 366
- Sacks: 42.0
- Forced fumbles: 4
- Fumble recoveries: 1
- Pass deflections: 9
- Stats at Pro Football Reference

Arik Armstead (born November 15, 1993) is an American professional football defensive end for the Jacksonville Jaguars of the National Football League (NFL). He played college football for the Oregon Ducks and was selected by the San Francisco 49ers in the first round of the 2015 NFL draft.

== Early life ==
Armstead attended Pleasant Grove High School in Elk Grove, California. During his high school football career, he had 126 tackles and 7.5 sacks. Armstead was a four-star recruit by Rivals.com and sixth best defensive end in his class. He originally committed to the University of Southern California to play college football, but switched to the University of Oregon. He also played basketball in high school.

== College career ==
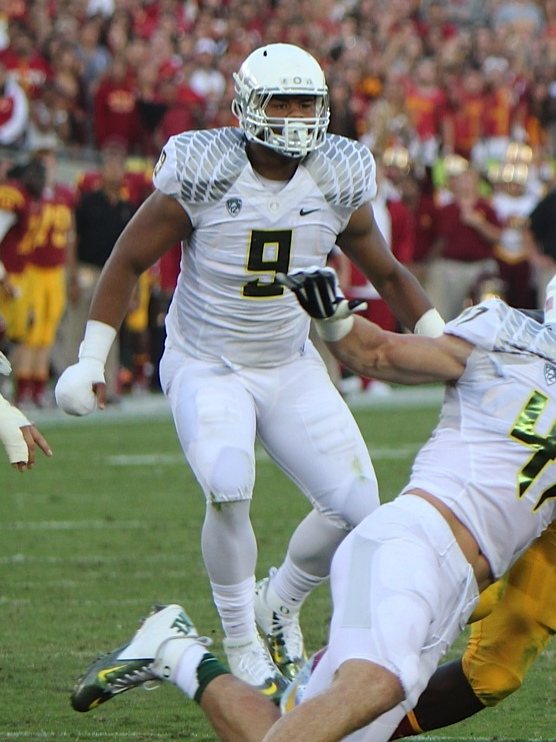
Armstead with Oregon in 2012

Armstead played in all 13 games as a true freshman in 2012, making one start. He finished the 2012 season with 26 tackles and a half-sack. During the spring he joined the Ducks basketball team, where he redshirted his first year. Armstead played in 13 games as a sophomore in 2013, recording 15 tackles and one sack. During the spring he re-joined the basketball team. He played in one game, before quitting to focus on football. Armstead returned to the football team his junior season in 2014. Following the 2014 season, he declared for the NFL Draft.

== Professional career ==
Pre-draft measurables
Height	Weight	Arm length	Hand span	Wingspan	40-yard dash	10-yard split	20-yard split	20-yard shuttle	Three-cone drill	Vertical jump	Broad jump	Bench press	Wonderlic
6 ft 7 1/8 in (2.01 m)	292 lb (132 kg)	33 in (0.84 m)	10 1/2 in (0.27 m)	6 ft 9 1/2 in (2.07 m)	5.10 s	1.75 s	2.92 s	4.53 s	7.57 s	34.0 in (0.86 m)	9 ft 9 in (2.97 m)	24 reps	26
All values from NFL Combine

=== San Francisco 49ers ===
==== 2015 season ====
The San Francisco 49ers selected Armstead in the first round (17th overall) in the 2015 NFL draft. He was the fourth defensive end selected in 2015. Armstead was unable to attend training camp and organized team activities until Oregon's school year had concluded due to the NFL's policy that prohibits rookies joining teams until their year is officially completed. Upon arrival, he was competing for the job as the starting defensive end against Quinton Dial, Darnell Dockett, Glenn Dorsey, and Tank Carradine after it was left vacant due to the retirement of Justin Smith. Head coach Jim Tomsula named him the fifth defensive end on the depth chart to begin the regular season, behind Quinton Dial, Glenn Dorsey, Tank Carradine, and Tony Jerod-Eddie.

Armstead made his NFL debut in the season-opening 20–3 victory against the Minnesota Vikings. During the game, Armstead recorded one tackle for loss. In Week 3 of the season, Armstead recorded three combined tackles and made his first NFL sack on quarterback Carson Palmer for a four-yard loss during a 47–7 road loss to the Arizona Cardinals. In Week 11, he collected a season-high six combined tackles in a 29–13 loss at the Seattle Seahawks. In Week 17, Armstead earned his first NFL start and made a solo tackle during a 19–16 overtime victory over the St. Louis Rams.

Armstead finished his rookie year with 19 combined tackles (14 solo) and two sacks in 16 games played with one game started.

==== 2016 season ====
The 49ers hired Chip Kelly as their new head coach, who was also Armstead's head coach at Oregon. Armstead competed to be the starting defensive end after Glenn Dorsey was moved to nose tackle. Armstead competed against DeForest Buckner and Quinton Dial. Kelly named Armstead and Dial the starting defensive ends for Week 1.

In the season-opener against the Los Angeles Rams, Armstead recorded his first sack of the season on Case Keenum during the 28–0 shutout win. In week 6 against the Buffalo Bills, Armstead recorded a strip sack on Tyrod Taylor which was recovered by former college teammate DeForest Buckner during the 45–16 loss.

On November 8, 2016, the 49ers placed Armstead on injured reserve with a left shoulder injury. A week later, he had surgery to repair the injured shoulder. Armstead finished his second season with 15 combined tackles (nine solo), a forced fumble, and 2.5 sacks in eight games and four starts.

==== 2017 season ====
During Week 2 against the Seahawks, Armstead recorded his first and only full sack of the season on Russell Wilson during the 12–9 road loss. On October 17, 2017, Armstead was placed on injured reserve after suffering a broken hand in Week 6. He finished his third season with 16 combined tackles (eight solo), 1.5 sacks, and a pass deflection in six games.

==== 2018 season ====
On April 30, 2018, the 49ers picked up the fifth-year option on Armstead's contract. During Week 3 against the Kansas City Chiefs, he recorded his first sack of the season on Patrick Mahomes during the 38–27 road loss. In Week 7 against the Rams, Armstead recorded a season high five tackles and sacked Jared Goff once during the 39–10 loss. In the next game against the Cardinals, Armstead sacked rookie quarterback Josh Rosen once during the 18–15 road loss. Armstead finished the season with 48 tackles (33 solo) and three sacks in 16 games and starts.

==== 2019 season ====
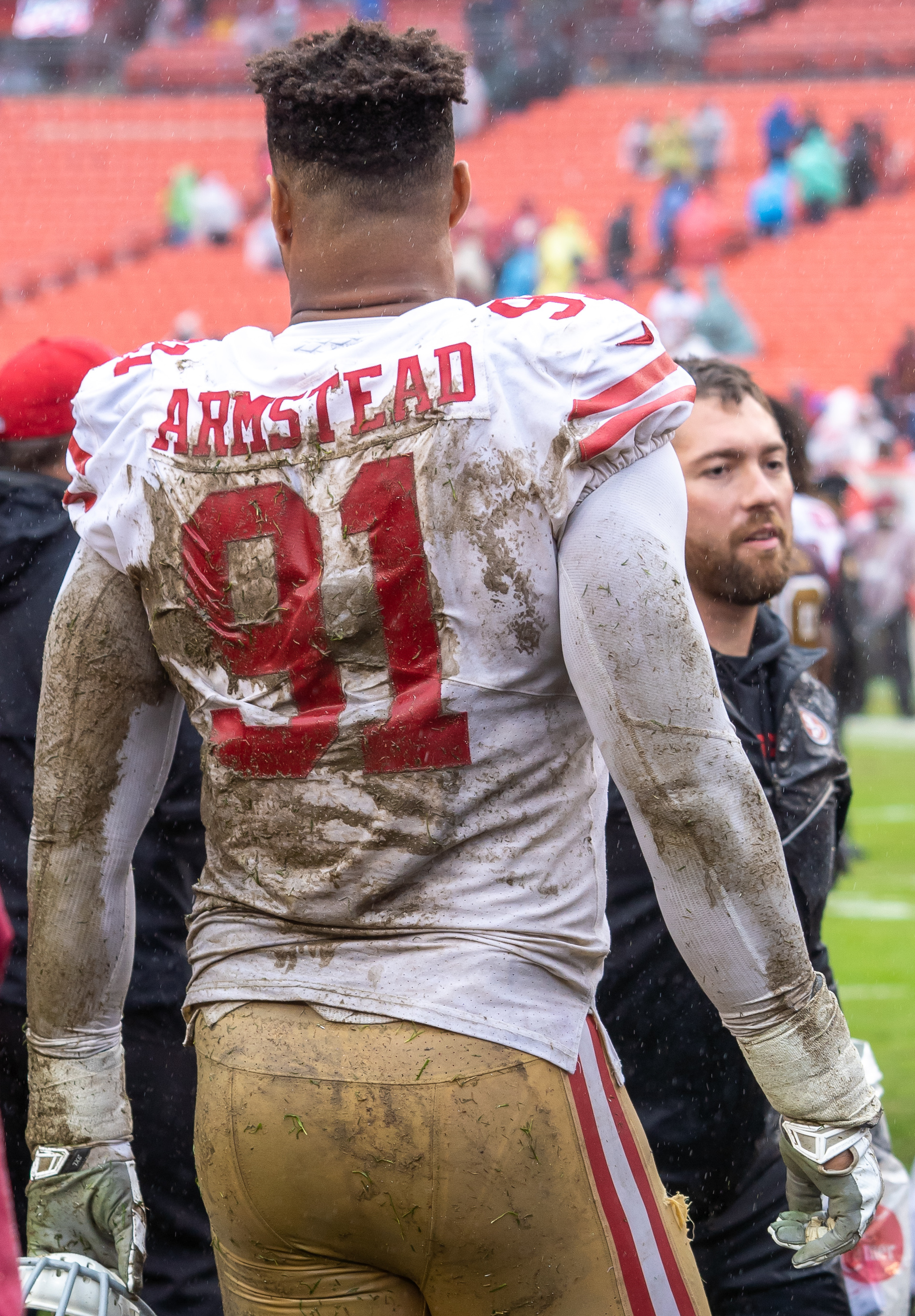
Armstead with San Francisco in 2019

During the season-opener against the Tampa Bay Buccaneers, Armstead recorded his first sack of the season on Jameis Winston during the 31–17 road victory. Two weeks later against the Pittsburgh Steelers, he forced a fumble on James Conner which was recovered by DeForest Buckner late in the fourth quarter to help seal a 24–20 win. During Week 6 against the Rams, Armstead recorded a season high 6 tackles, half a sack on Jared Goff, and recovered a fumble lost by Goff during the 20–7 road victory. In the next game against the Washington Redskins, he sacked Case Keenum once during the 9–0 road victory. With that sack, Armstead set a new single season career high of 3.5 sacks. The following week against the Carolina Panthers, Armstead sacked Kyle Allen twice during the 51–13 win. Two weeks later against the Seahawks on Monday Night Football, he sacked Russell Wilson 1.5 times during the 27–24 overtime loss. During Week 12 against the Green Bay Packers on Sunday Night Football, Armstead sacked Aaron Rodgers twice during the 37–8 win.

The 2019 season was a breakout season for Armstead. He recorded 54 tackles (32 solo), a team-leading 10 sacks, two forced fumbles, and a fumble recovery in 16 games and starts. He also ranked second on the 49ers regarding tackles for loss.

Armstead made his playoff debut in the National Football Conference (NFC) Divisional Round of the playoffs against the Vikings. During the game, Armstead sacked Kirk Cousins once in the 27–10 win. In the NFC Championship Game against the Packers, he sacked Aaron Rodgers once during the 37–20 win. In Super Bowl LIV against the Chiefs, Armstead recorded three tackles during the 31–20 loss.

==== 2020 season ====
On March 16, 2020, Armstead signed a five-year, $85 million contract extension with the 49ers with $48.5 million guaranteed. During Week 2 against the New York Jets, he recorded his first sack of the season on Sam Darnold during the 31–13 road victory. He was placed on the reserve/COVID-19 list by the team on November 16, 2020, and activated on November 25. In the 2020 season, he started in all 16 games. He finished with 3.5 sacks, 49 total tackles, and three passes defended.

==== 2021 season ====
On December 7, 2021, Armstead was nominated by the 49ers for the Walter Payton NFL Man of the Year Award. During Week 18, in the 49ers final game of the regular season, Armstead recorded 2.5 sacks in a 27–24 overtime victory against the Rams. The victory clinched the 49ers' spot in the playoffs that year. In the 2021 season, Armstead started in all 17 games. He had six sacks and 63 total tackles. Two weeks later, in the NFC Divisional Round, Armstead sacked Packers quarterback Aaron Rodgers twice in a 13-10 victory that sent the 49ers to the NFC Championship Game.

==== 2022 season ====
On November 10, 2022, Armstead revealed that he was rehabbing a hairline fracture in his left ankle. He appeared in and started nine games. He recorded two sacks in the 49ers' three postseason games.

==== 2023 season ====
In the 2023 season, Armstead appeared in and started 12 games. He finished with five sacks and 27 total tackles.

In Super Bowl LVIII, Armstead recorded one sack and six total tackles in the 25–22 overtime loss to the Chiefs. Two days after losing the Super Bowl, it was revealed that Armstead was playing through a knee injury during the playoffs, which later turned out to be a torn meniscus. Armstead told reporters that he suffered the injury on December 3, 2023, after a game against the Philadelphia Eagles. Armstead required surgery on the meniscus, which caused him to miss most off-season activities.

On March 13, 2024, Armstead was released by the 49ers.

=== Jacksonville Jaguars ===
On March 15, 2024, the Jacksonville Jaguars signed Armstead to a three-year, $51 million contract. He had two sacks, 29 tackles, and three passes defended. In the 2025 season, he had 5.5 sacks and 28 tackles.

== NFL career statistics ==
=== Regular season ===
Year	Team	Games		Tackles					Fumbles				Interceptions					
Year	Team	GP	GS	Cmb	Solo	Ast	Sck	TFL	FF	FR	Yds	TD	Int	Yds	Avg	Lng	TD	PD
2015	SF	16	1	19	14	5	2.0	3	0	0	0	0	0	0	0.0	0	0	0
2016	SF	8	4	15	9	6	2.5	2	1	0	0	0	0	0	0.0	0	0	0
2017	SF	6	6	16	8	8	1.5	2	0	0	0	0	0	0	0.0	0	0	1
2018	SF	16	16	48	33	15	3.0	6	0	0	0	0	0	0	0.0	0	0	0
2019	SF	16	16	54	32	22	10.0	11	2	1	0	0	0	0	0.0	0	0	2
2020	SF	16	16	49	29	20	3.5	6	0	0	0	0	0	0	0.0	0	0	3
2021	SF	17	17	63	29	34	6.0	7	0	0	0	0	0	0	0.0	0	0	0
2022	SF	9	9	11	8	3	0.0	2	0	0	0	0	0	0	0.0	0	0	0
2023	SF	12	12	27	15	12	5.0	4	0	1	0	0	0	0	0.0	0	0	0
2024	JAX	17	1	29	21	8	2.0	3	0	0	0	0	0	0	0.0	0	0	3
2025	JAX	16	11	28	13	15	5.5	7	1	0	0	0	0	0	0.0	0	0	0
2026	JAX	5	5	7	5	2	1.0	2	0	0	0	0	0	0	0.0	0	0	0
Career		154	114	366	216	150	42.0	55	4	2	0	0	0	0	0.0	0	0	9

=== Postseason ===
Year	Team	Games		Tackles					Fumbles				Interceptions					
Year	Team	GP	GS	Cmb	Solo	Ast	Sck	TFL	FF	FR	Yds	TD	Int	Yds	Avg	Lng	TD	PD
2019	SF	3	3	8	7	1	2.0	1	1	0	0	0	0	0	0.0	0	0	0
2021	SF	3	3	9	4	5	3.0	3	0	0	0	0	0	0	0.0	0	0	0
2022	SF	3	3	10	8	2	2.0	1	0	0	0	0	0	0	0.0	0	0	0
2023	SF	3	3	11	4	7	1.0	1	0	1	0	0	0	0	0.0	0	0	0
2025	JAX	1	1	4	2	2	0.0	0	0	0	0	0	0	0	0.0	0	0	0
Career		13	13	42	25	17	8.0	6	1	1	0	0	0	0	0.0	0	0	0

== Personal life ==
Armstead is a Christian. Armstead and his wife, Melinda, have three daughters and are expecting a fourth child. Melinda is a psychiatrist who specializes in child and adolescent psychiatry and runs her own practice called the Armstead Medical Group.

Armstead's brother, Armond, played college football at USC and in the Canadian Football League.

Armstead played in Chess.com's BlitzChamps, a rapid tournament for NFL players. He finished last in his group behind Larry Fitzgerald and Will Davis, and for personal reasons, Armstead was unable to play the consolation game. As a result, the players split the $22,500 consolation prize fund equally amongst their charities.
