= Benicia, California =

City in California, United States

- City
- City of Benicia
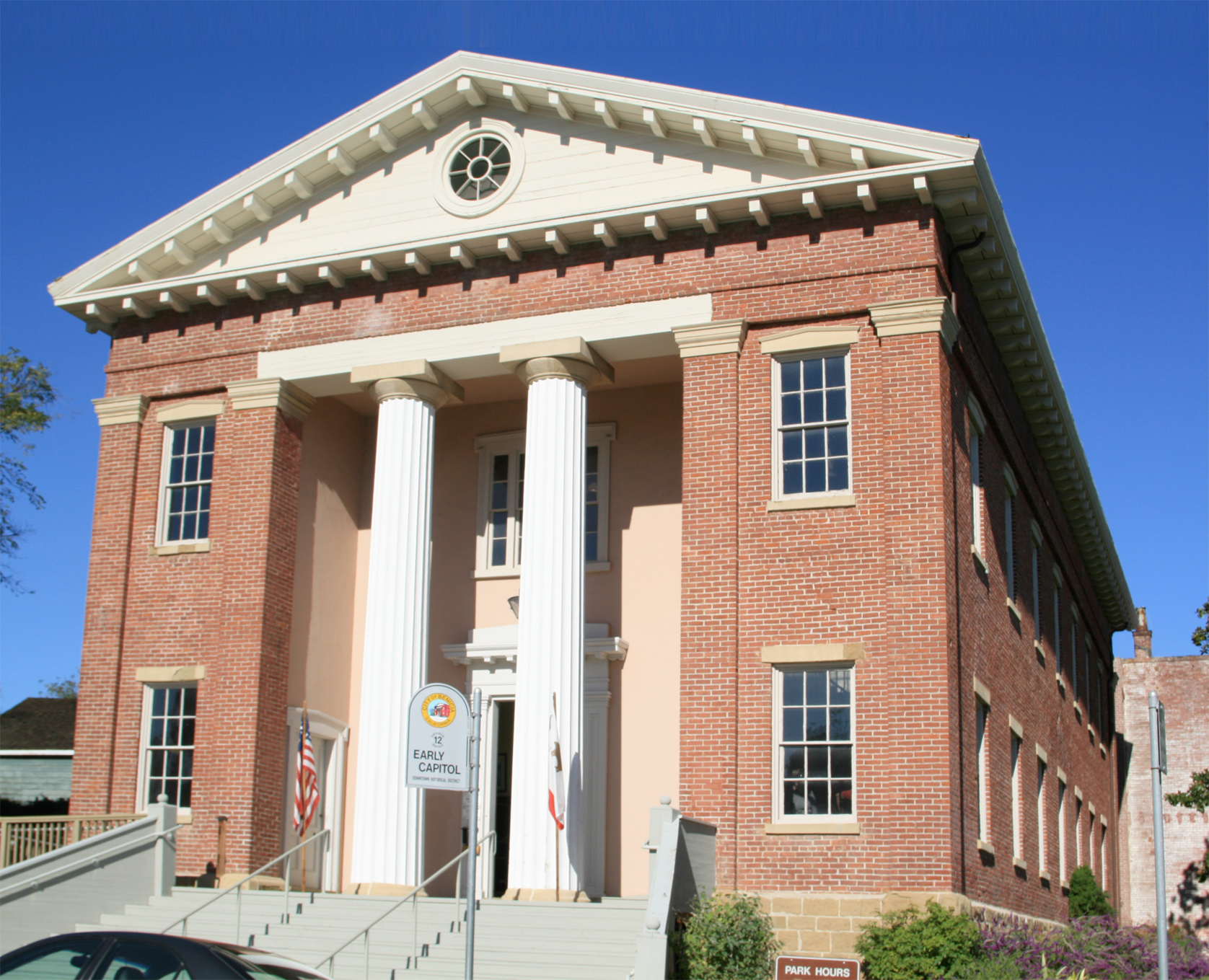
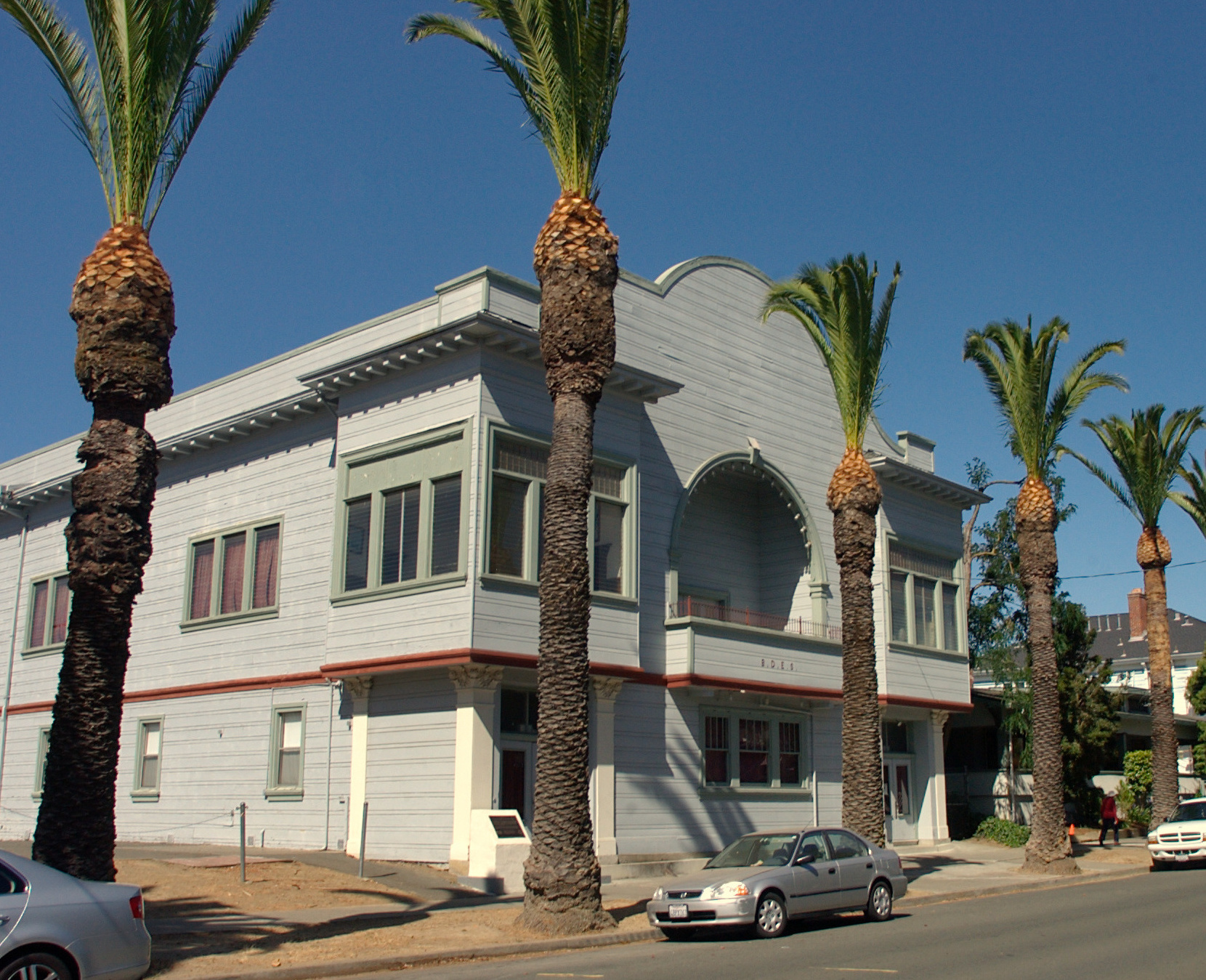
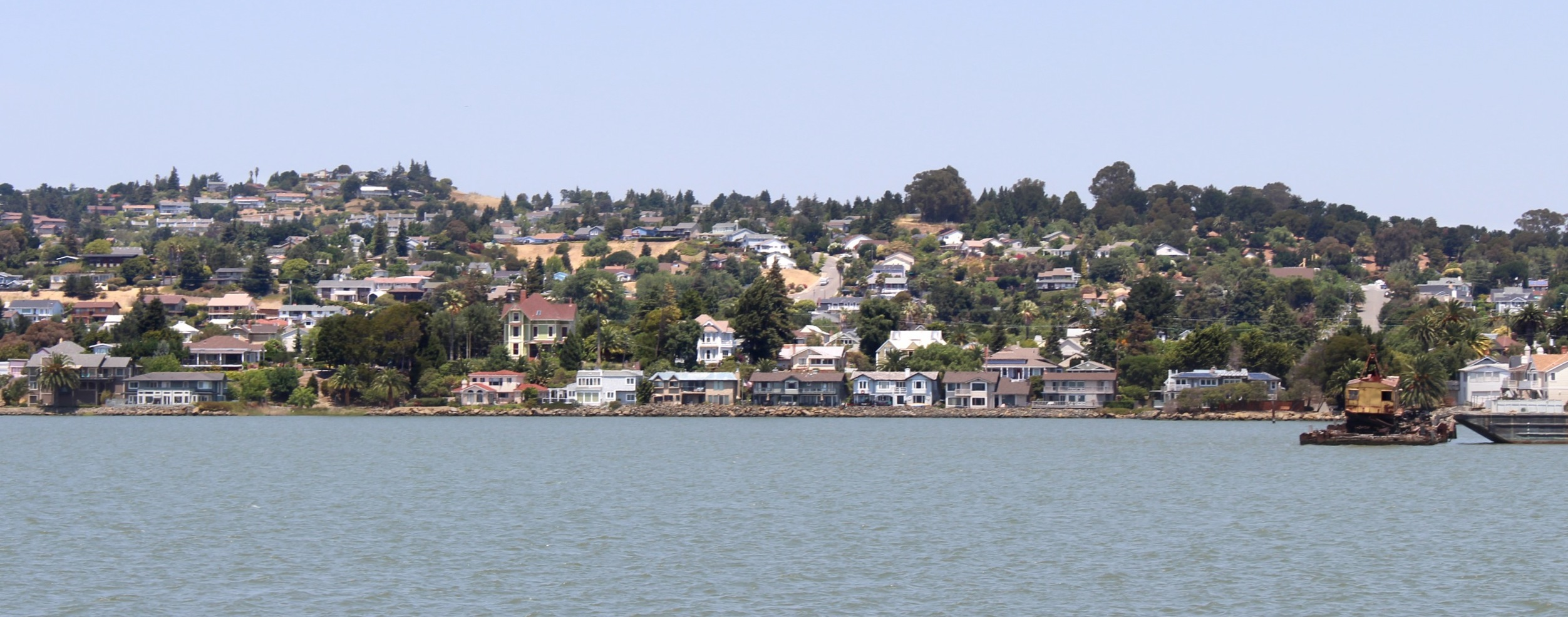
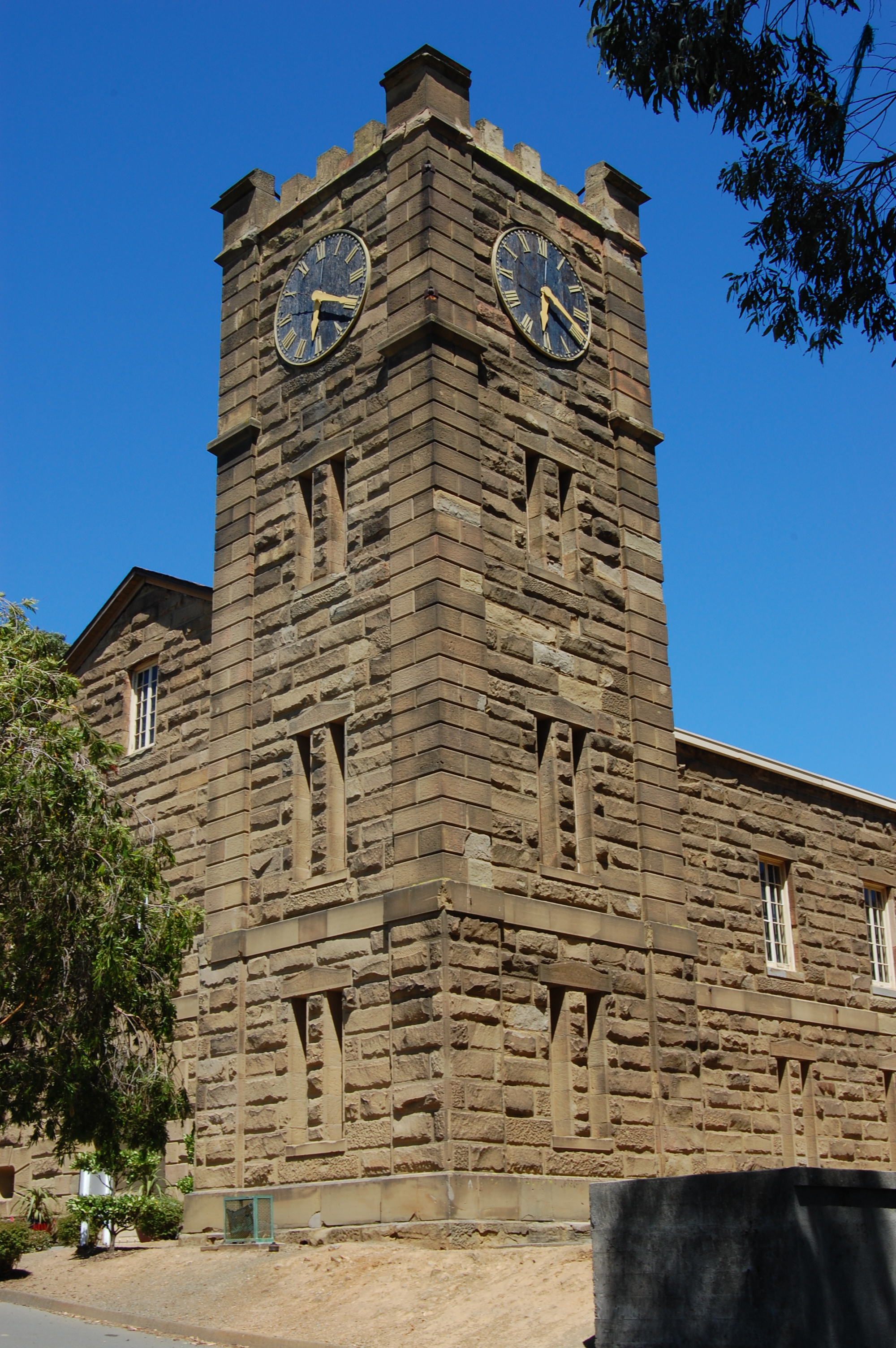
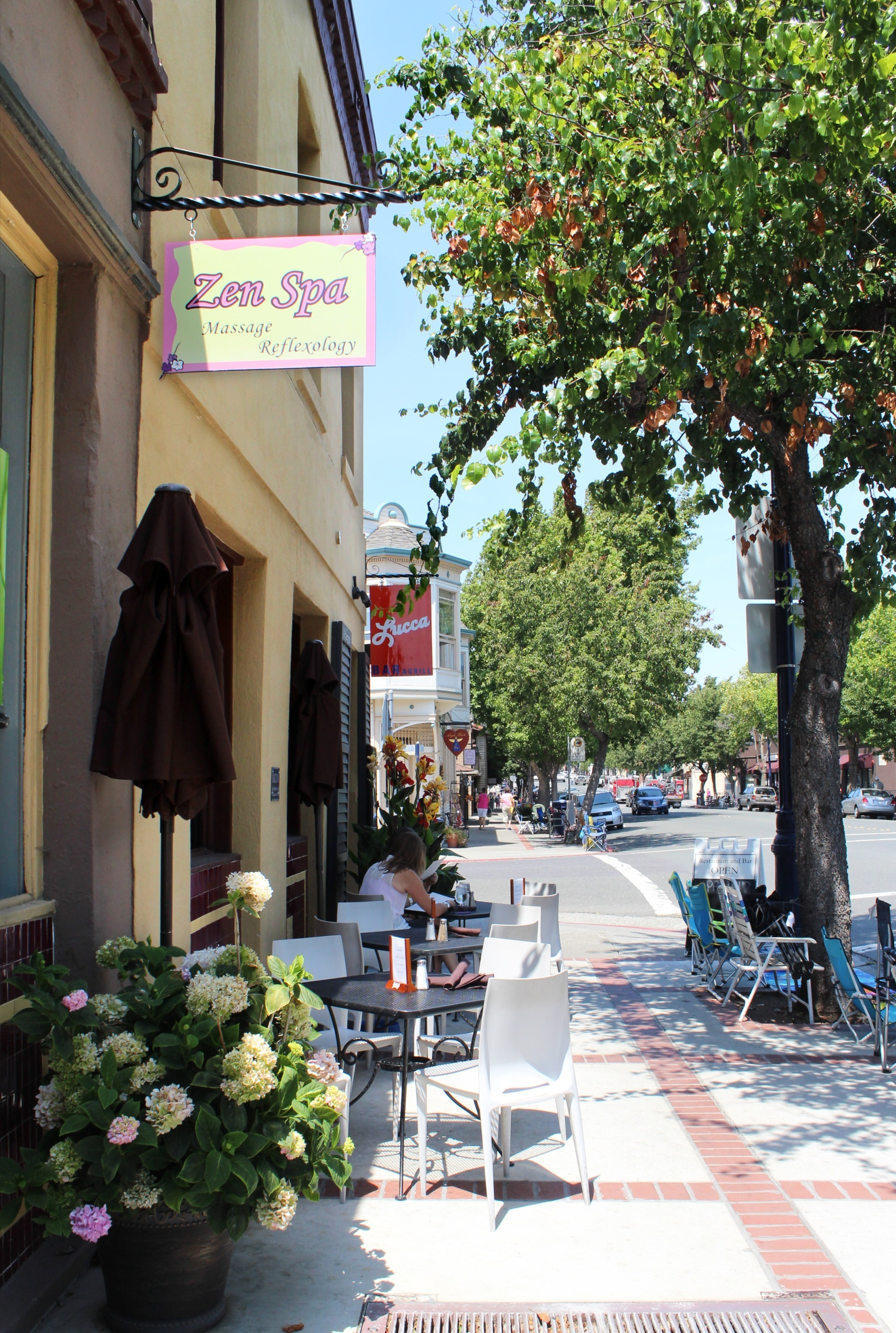
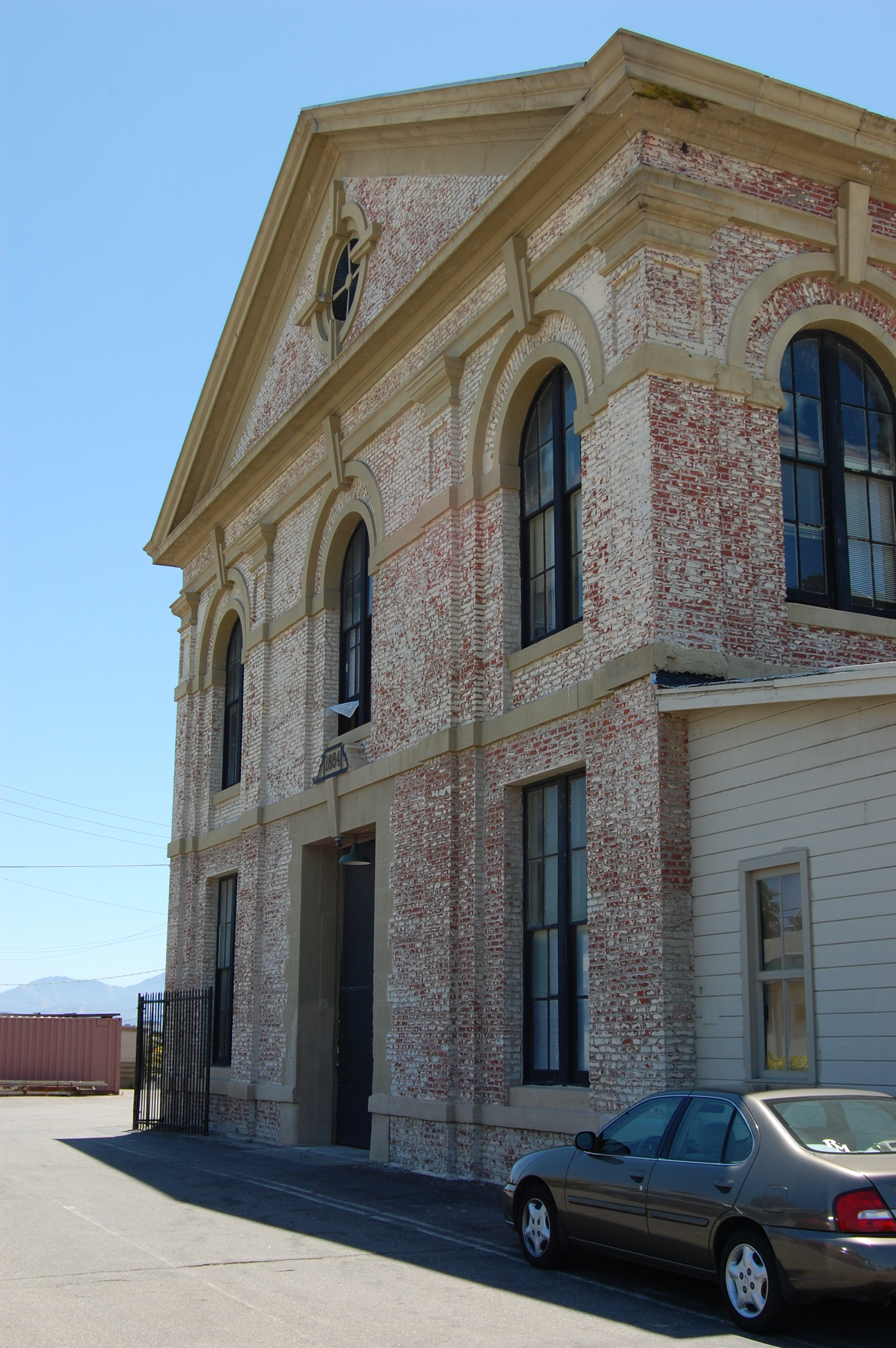
- Benicia Capitol Portuguese Hall of Benicia View from the Carquinez Strait Benicia Arsenal clocktower Downtown Benicia Old Arsenal Blacksmith

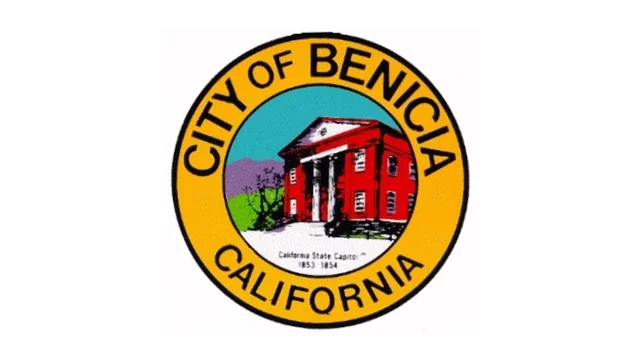
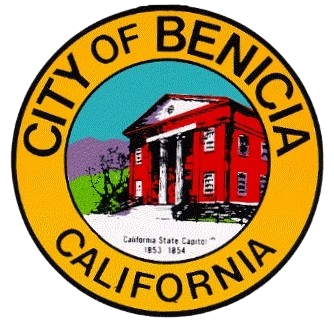
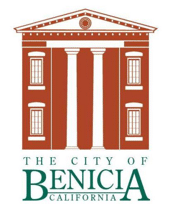
- Flag Seal Logo
- Motto: "It’s better in Benicia"
- Interactive map of Benicia, California
- Country: United States
- State: California
- County: Solano
- Incorporated: March 27, 1850

Government
  - Mayor: Steve Young
  - State senator: Christopher Cabaldon (D)
  - Assemblymember: Lori Wilson (D)
  - U. S. rep.: John Garamendi (D)

Area
  - Total: 14.12 sq mi (36.57 km^{2})
  - Land: 12.81 sq mi (33.19 km^{2})
  - Water: 1.31 sq mi (3.39 km^{2}) 9.26%
- Elevation: 26 ft (8 m)

Population (2020)
  - Total: 27,131
  - Density: 2,117.5/sq mi (817.56/km^{2})
- Time zone: UTC−8 (Pacific)
  - Summer (DST): UTC−7 (PDT)
- ZIP Code: 94510
- Area code: 707, 369
- FIPS code: 06-05290
- GNIS feature IDs: 0277472, 2409833
- Website: www.ci.benicia.ca.us

Benicia (Note: Pronounced /bəˈniːʃə/ bə-NEESH-ə, Spanish: [beˈnisja]) is a city in Solano County, California, United States, on the north bank of the Carquinez Strait in the North Bay region of the San Francisco Bay Area. It served as the capital of California for nearly thirteen months from 1853 to 1854. The population was 27,131 at the 2020 United States census. Benicia is just east of Vallejo and across the strait from Martinez.

== History ==
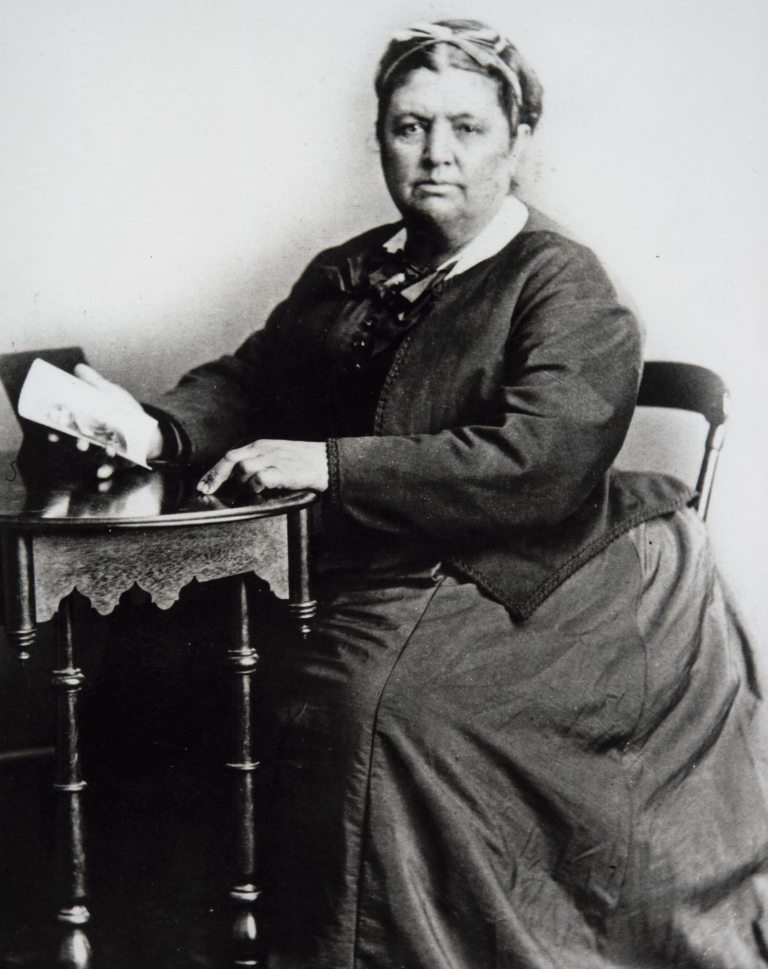
Benicia is named after Francisca Benicia Carillo de Vallejo, commonly known as Doña Benicia, a Californio ranchera, member of the Carrillo family of California, and wife of General Mariano Guadalupe Vallejo, namesake of nearby Vallejo.

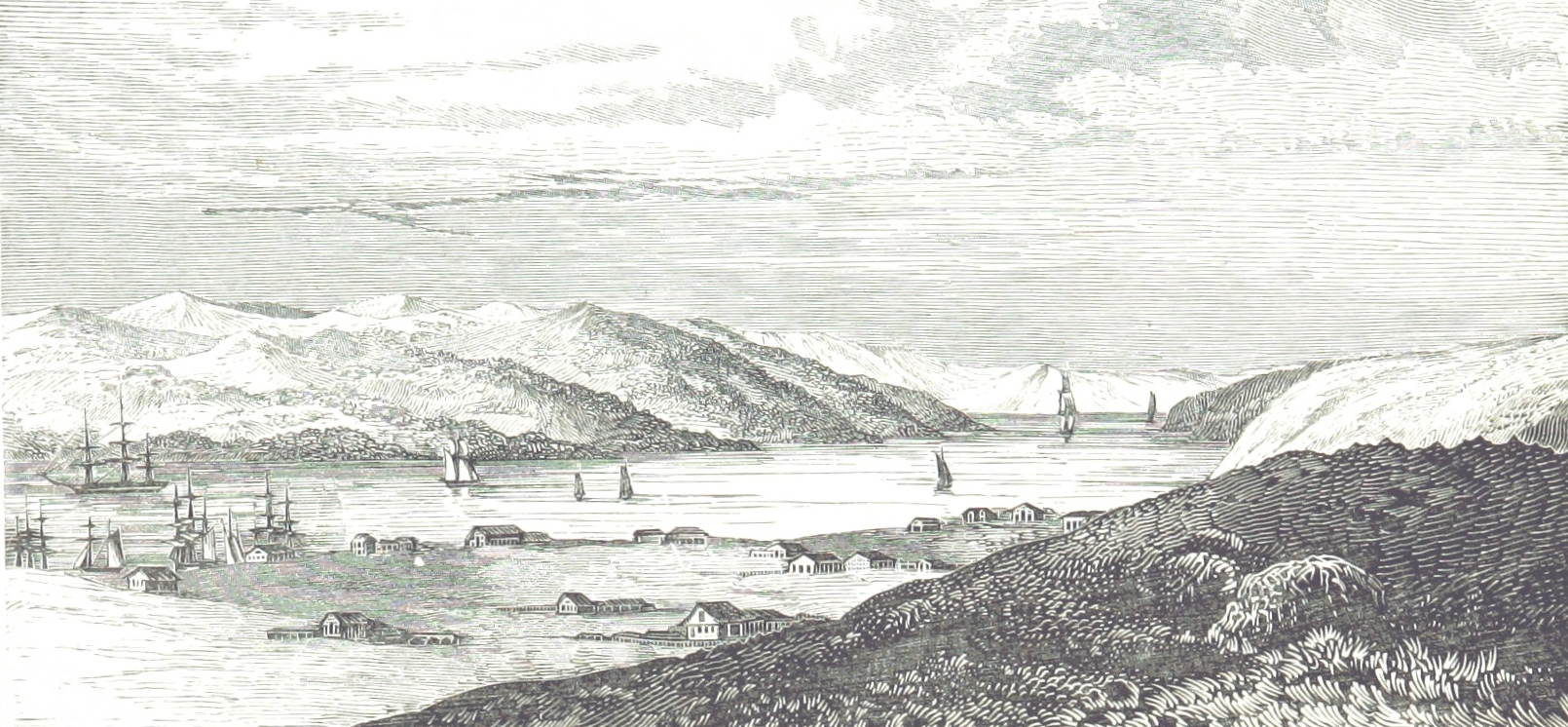
View of Benicia in 1850

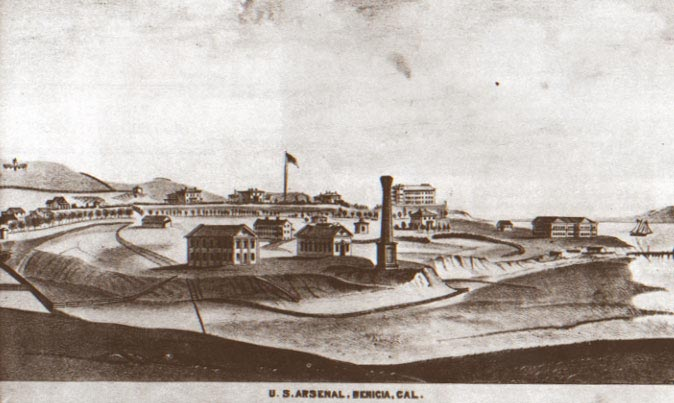
Benicia Arsenal in 1878

The City of Benicia was founded on May 19, 1847, by Dr. Robert Semple, Thomas O. Larkin, and Comandante General Mariano Guadalupe Vallejo, on land donated to them by General Vallejo in December 1846. It was named for the General's wife, Francisca Benicia Carillo de Vallejo, a member of the Carrillo family of California, a prominent Californio dynasty. The General intended that the city be named "Francisca" after his wife, but this name was dropped when the former city of "Yerba Buena" changed its name to "San Francisco," so her second given name was used instead. In his memoirs, William Tecumseh Sherman contended that Benicia was "the best natural site for a commercial city" in the region.

In February 1848, first word of gold found at Sutter's Mill was leaked at a Benicia Tavern, thus starting the California Gold Rush. Benicia became a way station on the way to the Sierras.

In March 1850, Benicia became one of the first incorporated cities in California, a month after Sacramento. Benicia was the original county seat of Solano County. The lower floor of the Benicia Masonic Hall, built in 1850 with lumber donated by Benicia founder Robert Semple on land donated by Alexander Riddell, was used as the County court room and offices prior to the completion of Benicia's city hall. In 1858, the county seat was moved to Fairfield.

In 1853, Benicia became the third site selected to serve as the California State capital, after San Jose and nearby Vallejo, and its newly constructed city hall was California's capitol from February 11, 1853, to February 25, 1854. Soon after, the legislature was moved to the courthouse in Sacramento, which has remained the state capitol ever since. The restored capitol is part of the Benicia Capitol State Historic Park, and is the only building remaining of the State's pre-Sacramento capitols.

The original campus of Mills College was founded in Benicia in 1852 as the Young Ladies Seminary, and was the first women's college west of the Rocky Mountains. Before moving to Oakland in 1871, it was located on West I Street, just north of First Street.

From 1860 to 1861, Benicia was indirectly involved in the Pony Express. When riders missed their connection with a steamer in Sacramento, they continued on to Benicia and crossed over to Martinez via the ferry. One of the earliest companies in California, the Pacific Mail Steamship Company, established a major shipyard in Benicia in the 19th century. The prolific shipbuilder Matthew Turner formed the Matthew Turner Shipyard at Benicia in 1883. Benicia became an important wheat storage and shipping site. It was also the site of the United States Army's Benicia Arsenal.

On December 1, 1879, the Central Pacific Railroad rerouted the Sacramento-Oakland portion of its transcontinental line to Benicia and established a major railroad ferry across the Carquinez Strait from Benicia to Port Costa. The world's largest ferry, the Solano, later joined by the even larger Contra Costa, carried entire trains across the Carquinez Strait from Benicia to Port Costa, whence they continued on to the Oakland Pier.

On June 5, 1889, the legendary prize fight between James J. Corbett and Joe Choynski was held on a barge off the coast of Benicia. The match lasted 28 rounds, and is now commemorated by a plaque near Southampton Bay.

=== Modern era ===
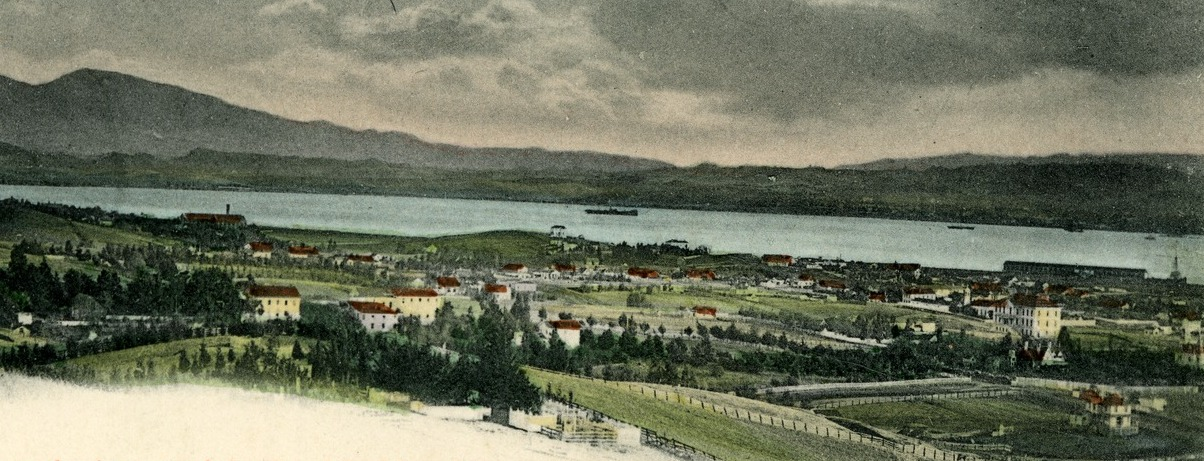
View of Benicia in 1905

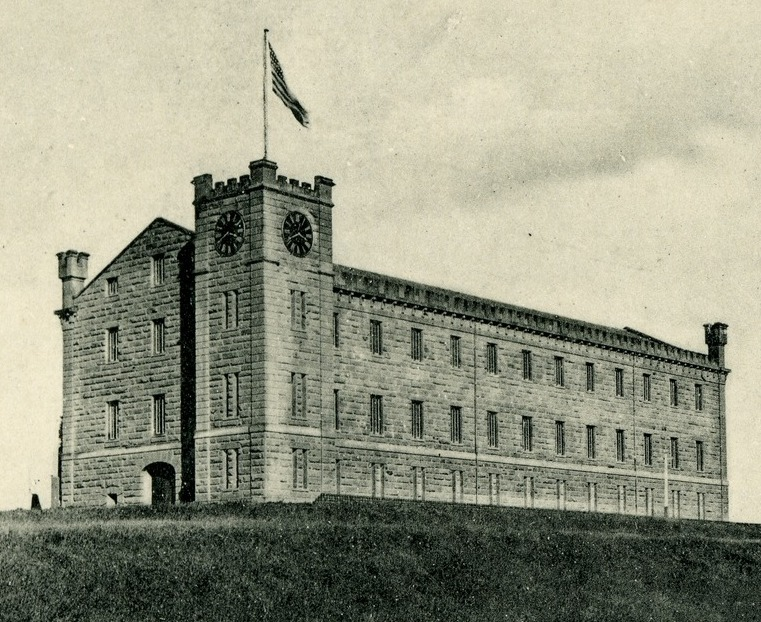
Benicia Arsenal in 1905

In 1901, the world's first long-distance powerline crossing over Carquinez Strait was built. After California's wheat output dropped in the early 20th century and especially after the Southern Pacific (which took over the operations of the Central Pacific) opened a railroad bridge to Martinez on October 15, 1930, eliminating the ferry crossing and the Benicia station, Benicia declined until the economic boom of World War II, in which the population doubled to about 7,000 residents.

A major fire on March 22, 1945, destroyed a half-block of businesses, including the nearly-century-old “old brewery”, and the Solano Hotel, with flames briefly threatening the old state capitol, now a historical landmark. A roof fire was quickly extinguished and the structure was not badly damaged. Losses were estimated at $125,000.

Two developments in the early 1960s completely changed Benicia: The closing of the Benicia Arsenal in 1960–64, and the completion of the Benicia–Martinez Bridge in 1962. The closing of the Arsenal removed Benicia's traditional economic base, but allowed city leaders to create an industrial park on Arsenal land which eventually provided more revenue for the city than the Army had. The completion of the Benicia-Martinez Bridge made it possible for the city to become a suburb of San Francisco and Oakland, and suburban development in the Benicia hills began in the late 1960s.

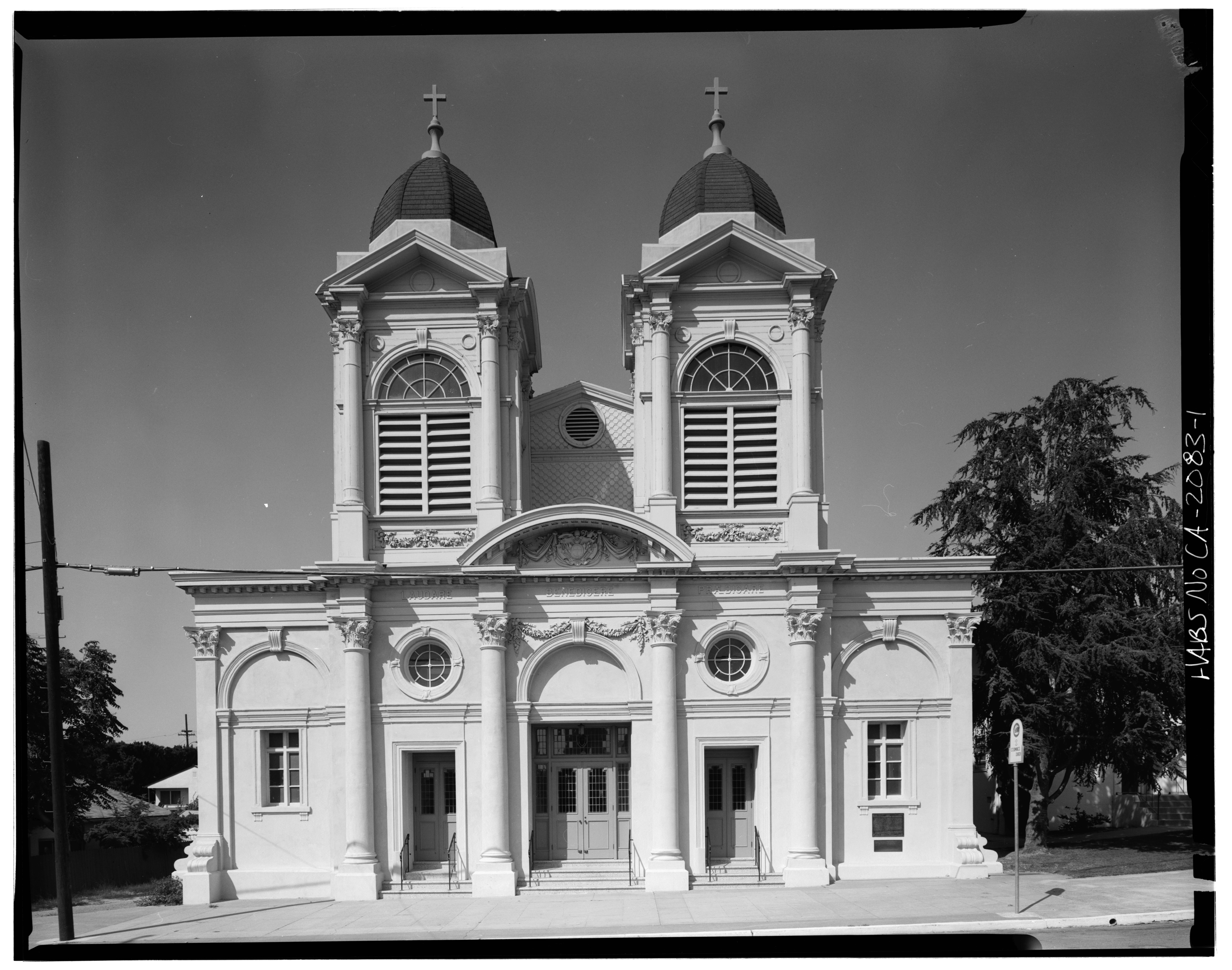
St. Dominic's Church, c. 1948

On December 20, 1968, near the Benicia water pumping station on Lake Herman Road, the Zodiac Killer made his debut by killing Vallejo natives David Faraday and Betty Lou Jensen as they rested or "necked" in Faraday's car. Near the same area on July 4 of the following year, the killer struck again, killing Darlene Elizabeth Ferrin and injuring Michael Mageau at the Blue Rock Springs Park in Vallejo, immediately next to Benicia.

Northeast of the town's residential areas an oil refinery was built and completed in 1969 by Humble Oil (later Exxon Corporation). The refinery was later bought by Valero Energy Corporation, a San Antonio-based oil company, in 2000.

Between 1970 and 1995, the population of Benicia grew steadily at a rate of about 1,000 people per year, and the city changed from a blue-collar town of 7,000 to a white-collar bedroom suburb of 27,000.

== Geography ==
According to the United States Census Bureau, the city has a total area of 14.1 square miles (37 km^{2}), of which 12.8 square miles (33 km^{2}) are land and 1.3 square miles (3.4 km^{2}), comprising 9.26%, are water. Benicia is located on the north side of the Carquinez Strait.

== Demographics ==
Historical population
Census	Pop.	Note	%±
1880	1,794		—
1890	2,361		31.6%
1900	2,751		16.5%
1910	2,360		−14.2%
1920	2,693		14.1%
1930	2,913		8.2%
1940	2,419		−17.0%
1950	7,284		201.1%
1960	6,070		−16.7%
1970	7,349		21.1%
1980	15,376		109.2%
1990	24,437		58.9%
2000	26,865		9.9%
2010	26,997		0.5%
2020	27,131		0.5%
U.S. Decennial Census

=== 2020 census ===
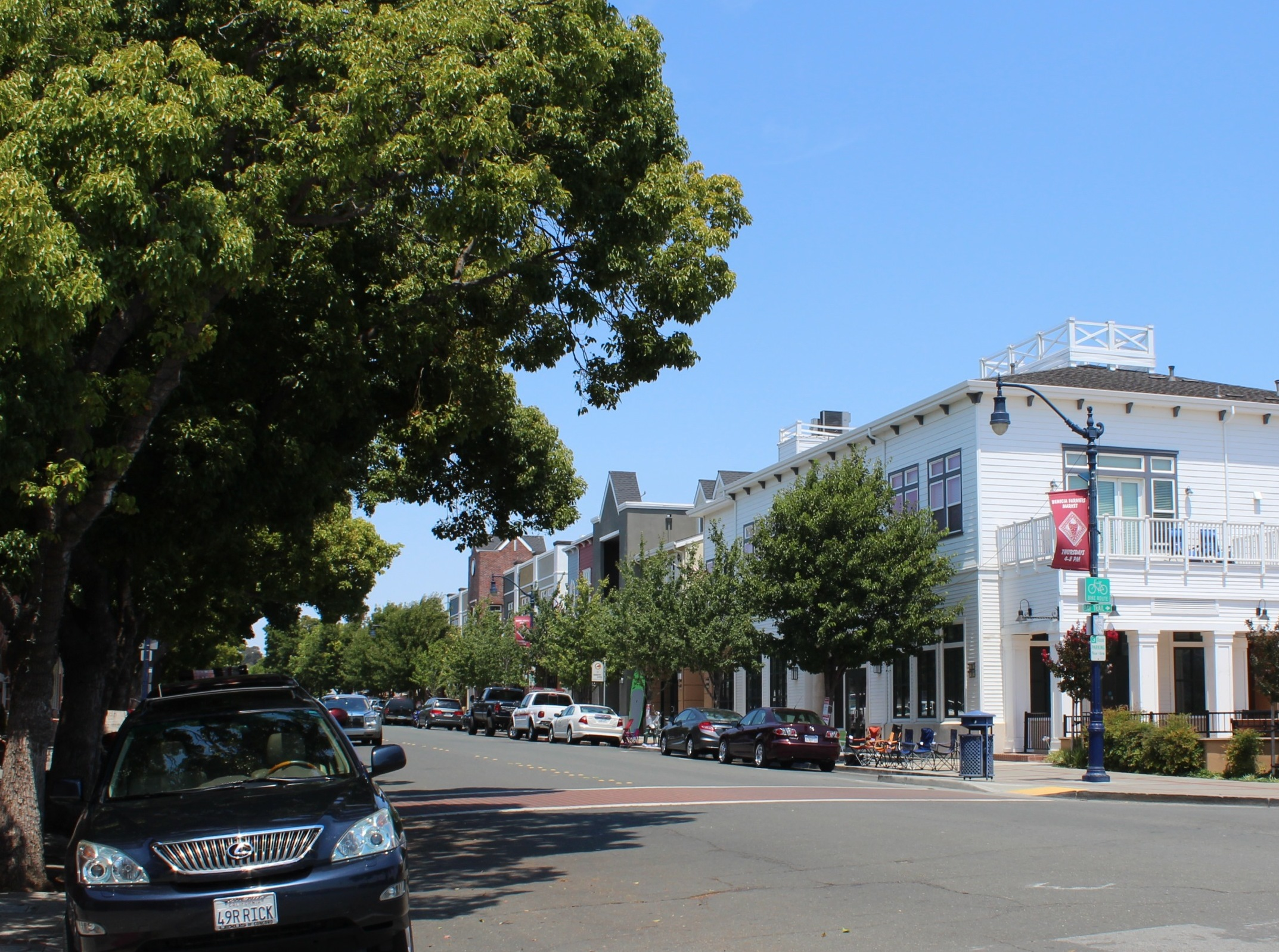
Downtown Benicia

As of the 2020 census, Benicia had a population of 27,131. The population density was 2,117.5 inhabitants per square mile (817.6/km^{2}). The census reported that 99.9% of the population lived in households, 0.1% lived in non-institutionalized group quarters, and no one was institutionalized. 99.9% of residents lived in urban areas and 0.1% lived in rural areas.

The median age was 45.8 years. 19.8% of residents were under the age of 18 and 21.6% of residents were 65 years of age or older. For every 100 females there were 90.4 males, and for every 100 females age 18 and over there were 87.3 males age 18 and over.

There were 10,957 households in Benicia, of which 29.5% had children under the age of 18 living in them. Of all households, 52.5% were married-couple households, 5.5% were cohabiting couple households, 28.1% were households with a female householder and no spouse or partner present, and 14.0% were households with a male householder and no spouse or partner present. About 25.3% of all households were made up of individuals and 12.3% had someone living alone who was 65 years of age or older, and the average household size was 2.47. There were 7,555 families (69.0% of all households).

There were 11,377 housing units, of which 3.7% were vacant. The homeowner vacancy rate was 0.9% and the rental vacancy rate was 3.9%. The average housing unit density was 887.9 units per square mile (342.8 units/km^{2}), of which 10,957 (96.3%) were occupied; 69.6% were owner-occupied and 30.4% were occupied by renters.

Racial composition as of the 2020 census
Race	Number	Percent
White	17,122	63.1%
Black or African American	1,378	5.1%
American Indian and Alaska Native	168	0.6%
Asian	3,260	12.0%
Native Hawaiian and Other Pacific Islander	113	0.4%
Some other race	1,048	3.9%
Two or more races	4,042	14.9%
Hispanic or Latino (of any race)	4,008	14.8%

=== 2023 estimates ===
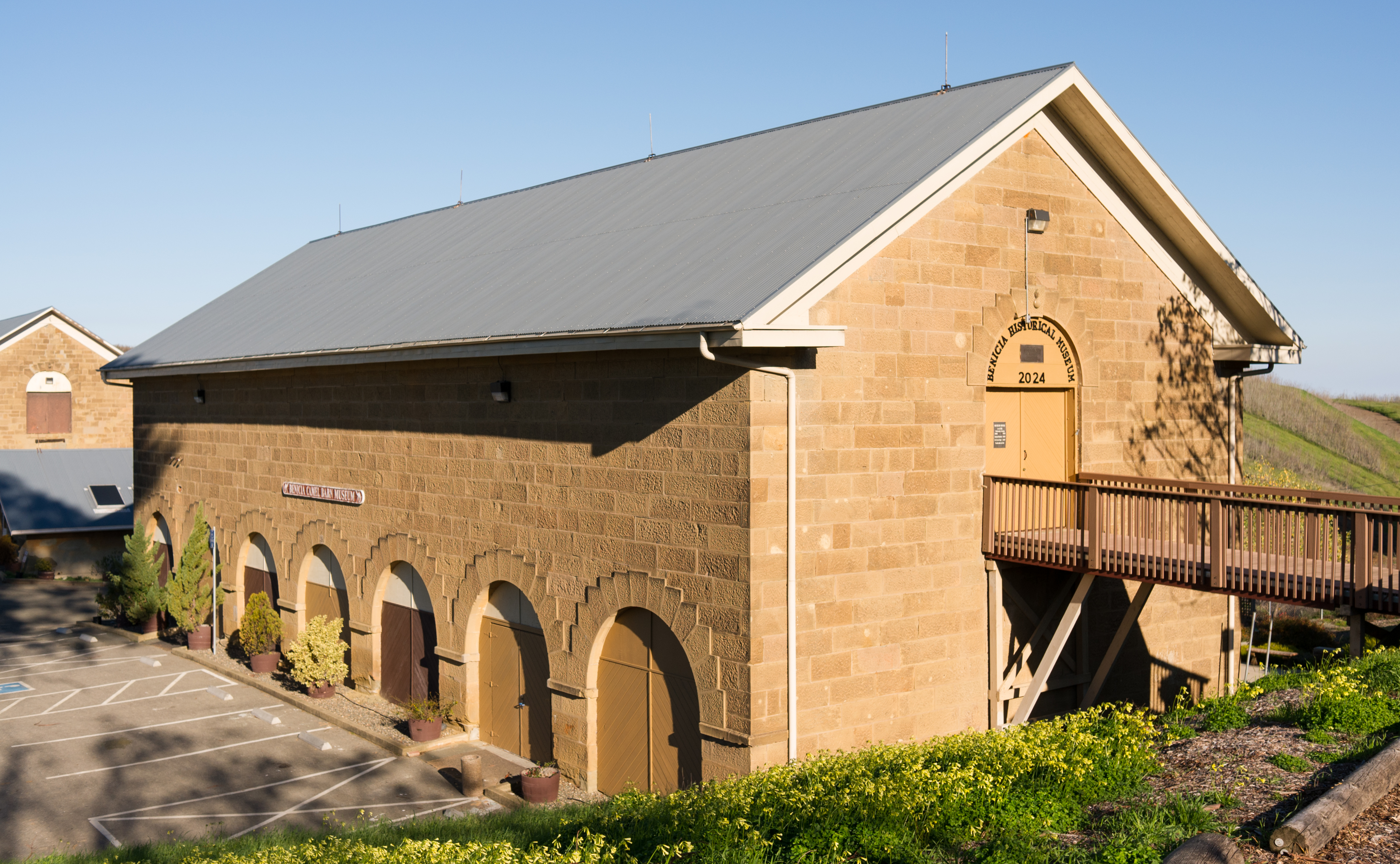
Camel Barn Museum

In 2023, the US Census Bureau estimated that 13.8% of the population were foreign-born. Of all people aged 5 or older, 81.6% spoke only English at home, 7.6% spoke Spanish, 3.5% spoke other Indo-European languages, 6.7% spoke Asian or Pacific Islander languages, and 0.7% spoke other languages. Of those aged 25 or older, 95.5% were high school graduates and 45.5% had a bachelor's degree.

The median household income was $125,040, and the per capita income was $62,347. About 6.2% of families and 6.9% of the population were below the poverty line.

== Economy ==
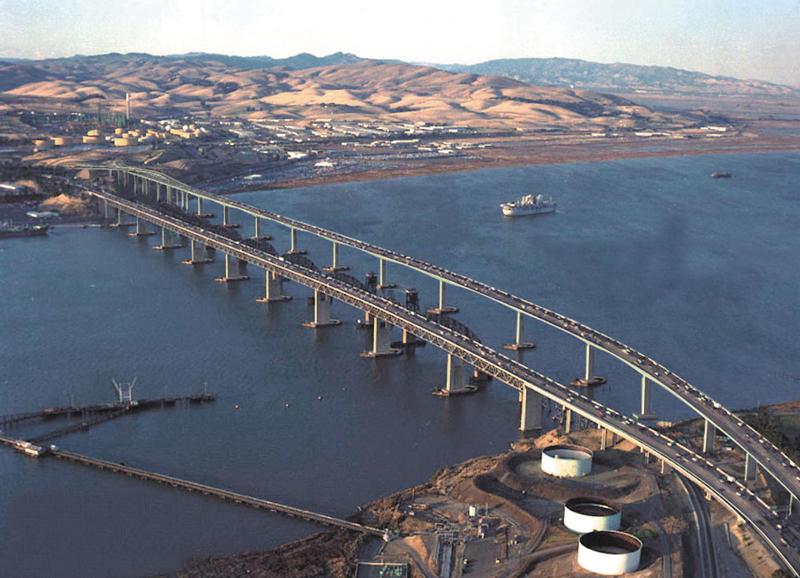
The Benicia-Martinez Bridge crosses the Carquinez Strait, connecting Benicia in the north to Martinez in the south.

=== Top employers ===
According to the city's 2025 Annual Comprehensive Financial Report, the top employers in the city are:

#	Employer	# of Employees
1	Valero	403
2	Valley Fine Foods Co, INC	258
3	Dunlop Manufacturing	231
4	Pro-form Laboratories	217
5	Rix Industries	189
6	Reyes Coca-Cola Bottling	184
7	APS West Coast Inc	117
8	Pepsico Beverage Sales, LLC	104
9	Central Coast Wine Co.	97
10	Unico Mechanical Corp	96

== Arts and culture ==
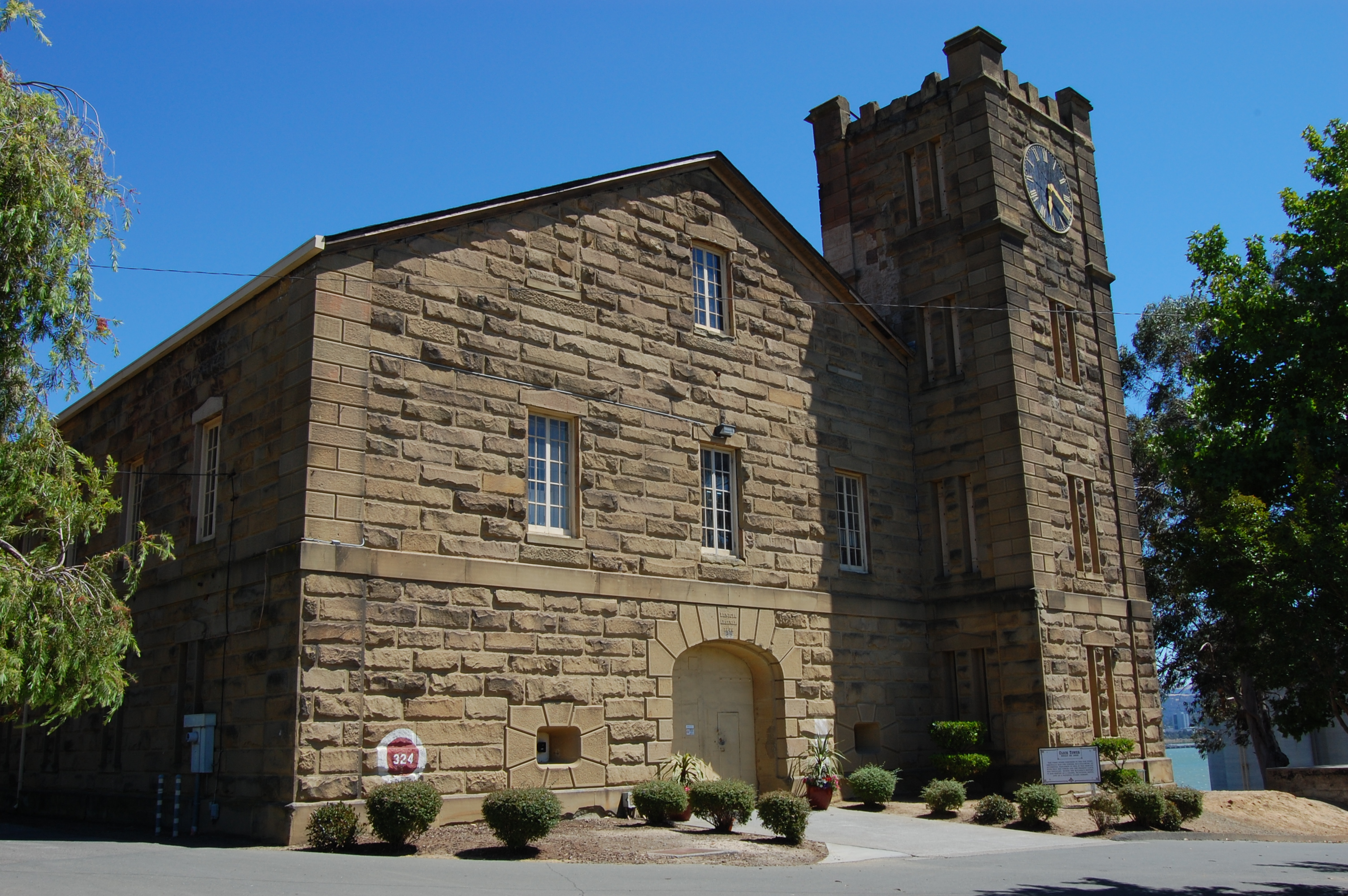
Benicia Arsenal Clocktower

Arts Benicia is a community-based non-profit organization whose mission is to stimulate, educate, and nurture cultural life in Benicia primarily through the visual arts. They provide exhibitions, educational programs, and classes that support artists and engage the broader community. The organization offers dynamic year-round art exhibitions and public art openings, the Benicia Artists Open Studios event in the spring, the Annual Benefit Art Auction in the fall, various special projects, and quarterly art classes for adults and kids. It is located in the Benicia Arsenal at the Commanding Officer's Quarters at 1 Commandant's Lane. Gallery hours are Thursday-Sunday, 12:00-5:00 pm during exhibitions; gallery admission is free to the public.

Arts in the Park is an annual summer art celebration held in Benicia City Park. The Benicia Peddler's Fair is one of the largest street fairs in Northern California, this outdoor event began in 1963 with a few collectable and antique stores displaying their items on tables outside St. Paul's Church. Traditionally held on the July 3, Benicia's Fourth of July parade stretches all the way down First Street and typically includes music, dancing, floats, horses, clowns, and live entertainment.

On the fourth Sunday in July, the Portuguese community in Benicia celebrates the feast of the Holy Ghost, continuing a devotion established by the Queen St. Isabel of Portugal, who was noted for her care for the poor. The festival starts with a parade to St. Dominic's Church followed by Mass, followed by an auction and a dance. The Holy Ghost Parade celebrated its centennial in Benicia in 2007.

Benicia is an active sailing community. In addition to individual sailing out of the Benicia Marina, there are several organized events and competitions. During the summer months, there is a yacht racing competition on Thursday evenings sponsored by the Benicia Yacht Club. The Yacht Club co-sponsors the annual Jazz Cup regatta with the South Beach Yacht Club, and also sponsors a Youth Sailing Program that offers extensive training.

== Education ==
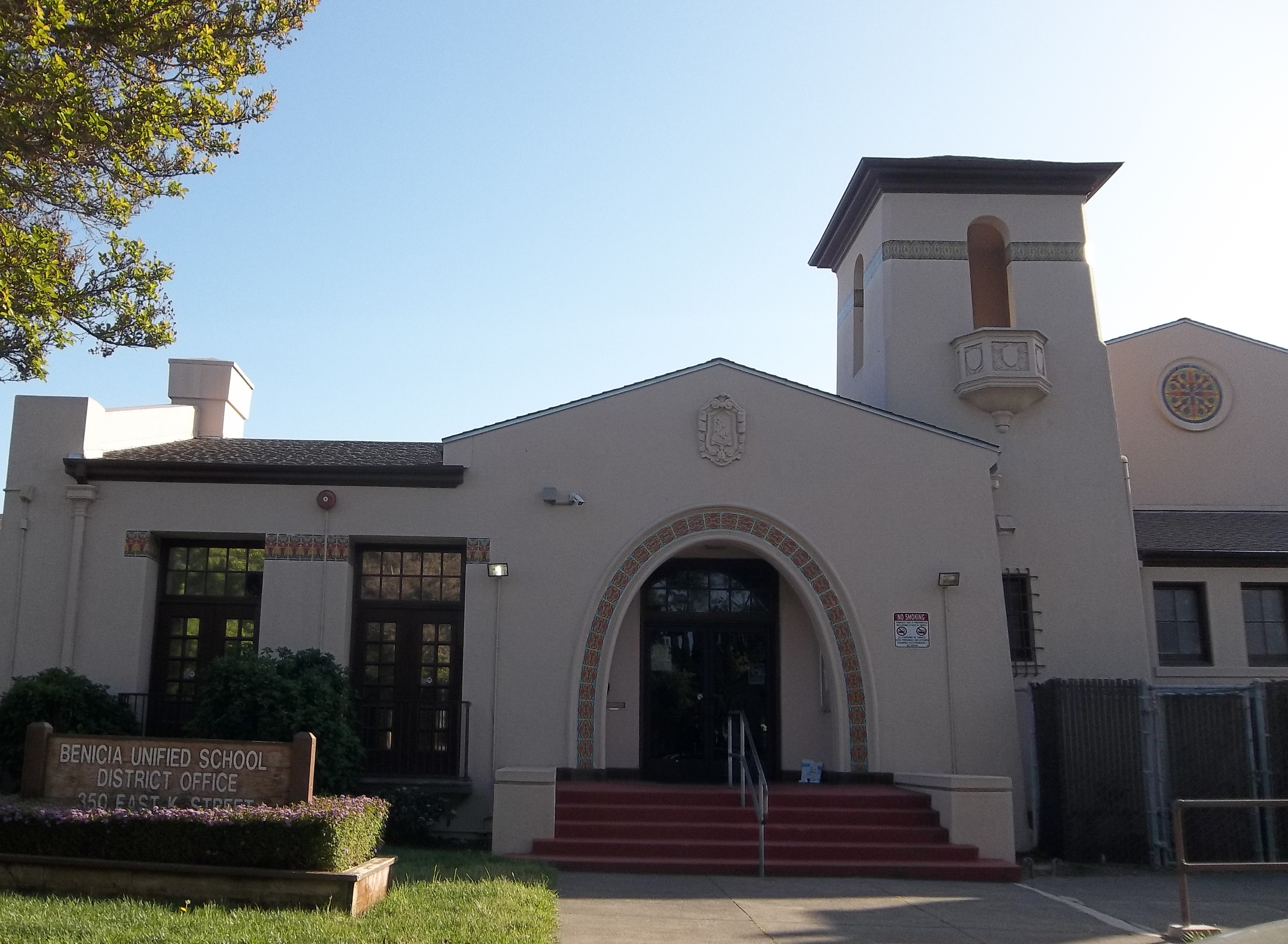
Benicia Unified School District

The Benicia Unified School District operates the city's public schools.

- Elementary
  - Matthew Turner Elementary School (named after a famous local shipbuilder)
  - Robert Semple Elementary School (named after one of the city's founders)
  - Mary Farmar Elementary School
  - Joe Henderson Elementary School (named after a local educator and school superintendent)
  - Mills Elementary School (closed permanently in 2005)
- Middle schools
  - Benicia Middle School
- High schools
  - Benicia High School
  - Liberty High School

== Transportation ==
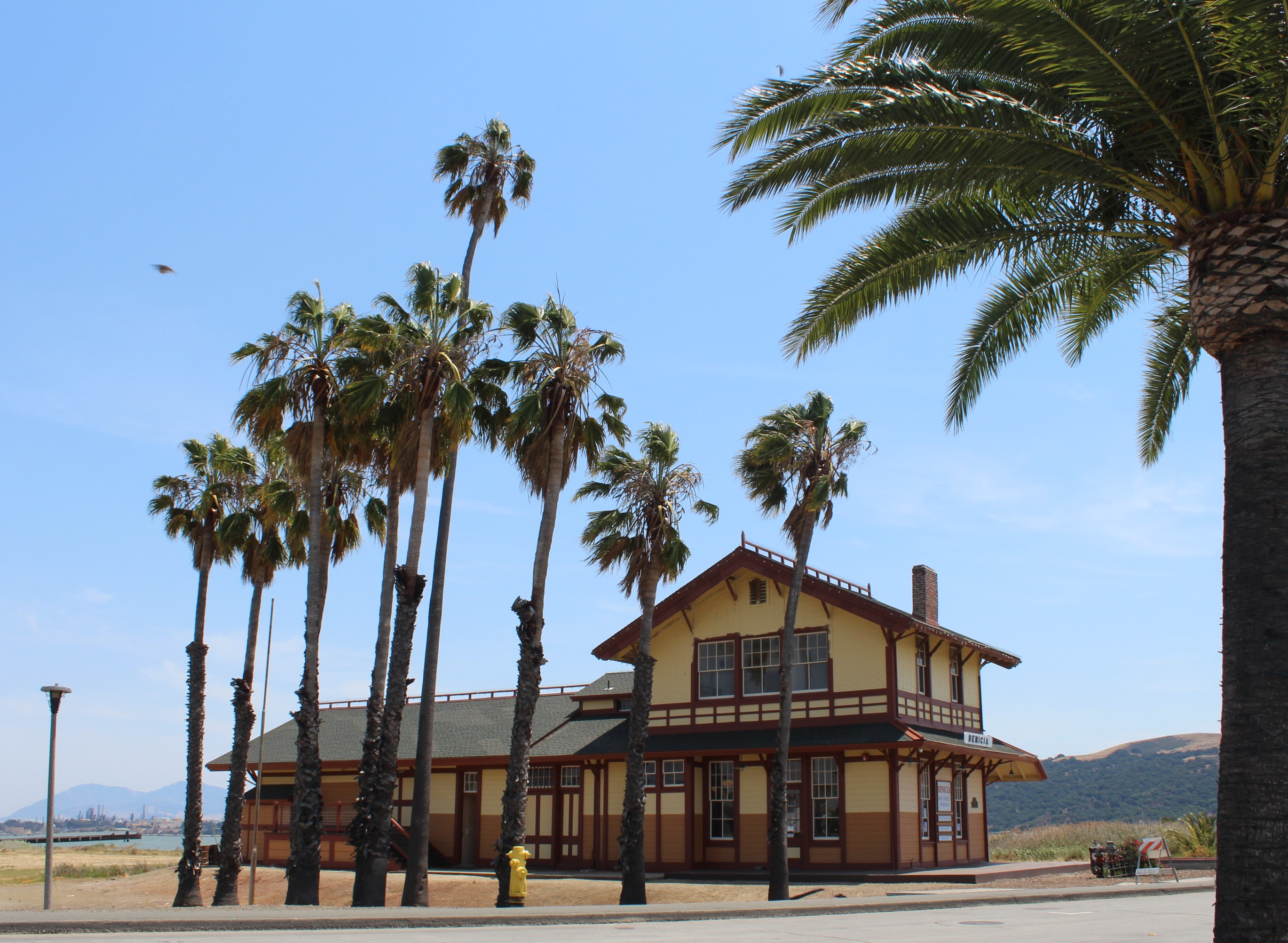
Historic train depot

=== Public Transportation ===
Due to the railroad bridge opening in 1930, Benicia has no rail transit, but offers bus transportation through SolTrans and SolanoExpress, which service the Benicia Park and Ride, where connections are available to the Walnut Creek BART station.

=== Marine Transportation ===
Two blocks from the main downtown district, the Benicia Marina is a full-service marina, offering a fuel dock, pump-out station, launch ramp, general store, laundry, restrooms and showers.

=== Highways ===
Interstate 680 runs west of Benicia, and is the eastern terminus of Interstate 780, that runs directly through the city. I-780 has five exits in Benicia. Exit 6 to East Fifth Street, Exit 5 to East Second Street, Exit 4 to Southampton Road and West Seventh Street, Exit 3B to K Street and Military West, and Exit 3A to Columbus Parkway, Rose Drive, and Benicia State Park Road.

== Notable people ==
=== Artists and designers ===
- Robert Arneson (1930–1992), sculptor, and professor of ceramics in the Art Department at UC Davis.
- Linda Fleming (born 1945), sculptor, and professor of art at CCA.
- Addison Mizner (1872–1933), visionary resort architect, born in Benicia.
- Manuel Neri (1930–2021), sculptor, had a studio in Benicia from 1965 until his death in 2021.
- Guillermo Wagner Granizo (1923–1995), ceramic tile muralist, moved to Benicia in 1980.

=== Politics ===
- Serranus Clinton Hastings, U.S. Congressman and founder of the Hastings College of the Law at University of California
- Lansing Mizner, Solano County judge and president of the California Senate

=== Sports ===
- Austin Carr, NFL football player
- John C. Heenan, boxer, aka "The Benicia Boy"
- Willie Calhoun, professional baseball player for the San Francisco Giants

=== Writers ===
- Stephen Vincent Benét, author of "The Devil and Daniel Webster" and other stories and poems, lived in the Arsenal as a young boy
- James Lloyd Breck, Episcopalian priest
- Jack London, author, worked in the local fishing industry, and began writing while living in Benicia
- Wilson Mizner, playwright, born in Benicia
- Elsie Robinson (1883–1956), American journalist, poet, memoirist, and short story writer, known for her syndicated Hearst column “Listen, World!”, born in Benicia

== Sister city ==
Benicia has one sister city.

- – Tula de Allende, Hidalgo, Mexico

== See also ==
- Benicia Capitol State Historic Park
- Benicia State Recreation Area
