= Benicia Unified School District =

School district in California, United States

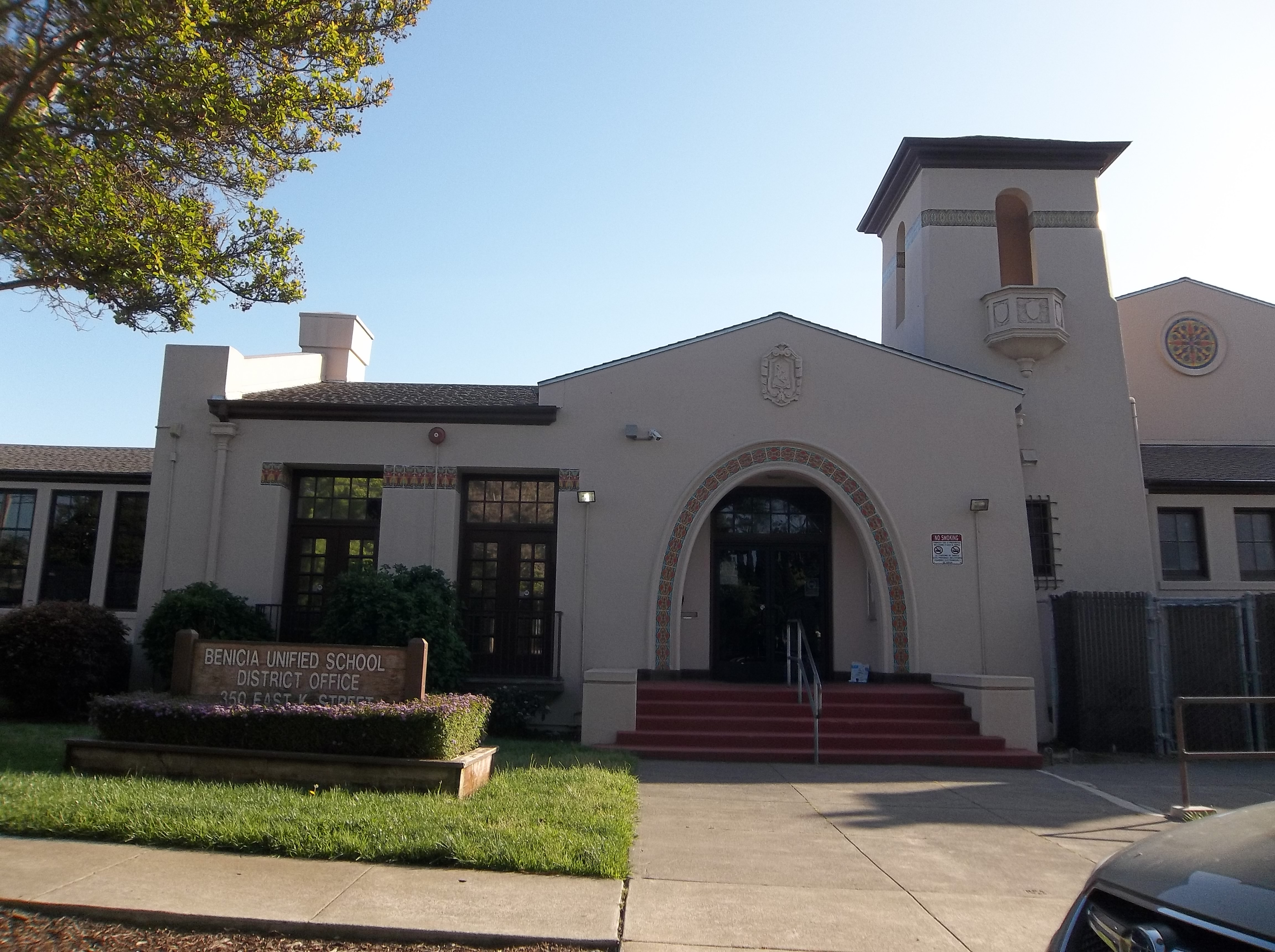

Address
- 350 East K Street Benicia Solano County, California, 94510; United States

District information
- Type: Public
- Motto: Educate. Challenge. Inspire.
- Grades: Pre-K through 12
- Established: May 1850; 176 years ago
- Superintendent: Dr. Charles Young
- Asst. superintendent(s): Dr. Khushwinder Gill, Leslie Beatson
- Director of education: Leslie Beatson
- Schools: Elementary 4 Middle 1 High 2
- NCES District ID: 0604620

Students and staff
- Students: 4,526 (2020–2021)
- Teachers: 189.75 (FTE)
- Staff: 173.0 (FTE)
- Student–teacher ratio: 23.85:1

Other information
- Website: www.beniciaunified.org

Benicia Unified School District is a public school district based in Benicia, a city in Solano County, California. It operates two high schools, a middle school and four elementary schools. The district had approximately 4,900 students enrolled in the 2018–2019 school year.

== Early history ==
Benicia was one of the earliest communities in California to establish a public education system, and the first public school there was opened in 1849 by Reverend Sylvester Woodbridge, Jr., an Old School Presbyterian missionary from Long Island, New York. Woodbridge also established in Benicia the first Protestant church in California. Woodbridge was one of four Presbyterian missionaries sent to California during the Gold Rush in 1849. One of them, Reverend Francis Hart of Missouri, died on the trip to California.

The Board of Education in Benicia, which later became the Benicia Unified School District, was organized in May 1850. The board agreed to pay Woodbridge $1000.00 for his work as a teacher that first year, making the payment to him in city bonds. Woodbridge was later appointed the first Commissioner of Common Schools for Solano County.

Benicia was California's state capital for just over a year in 1853 and 1854. The state capital was then relocated permanently to Sacramento. By 1855, there were 71 students enrolled in the Benicia school system.

== Charter school planning ==
The district has investigated the possibility of establishing a charter school but in 2009, was unable to reach an agreement with Pathways Charter Schools to establish one. Pathways operates in five North Bay counties, and has an office nearby in Vallejo, California.

== Unsuccessful tax measures ==
The district has tried but failed to increase local taxes to better support the schools in recent years. A proposed $105.00 per year parcel tax to give financial support to the district failed by 175 votes in November, 2004. Another parcel tax measure was on the ballot in June, 2006, but was unsuccessful. A six-year, $58.00 annual parcel tax measure was on the ballot in 2010, and received 62.8% of the vote. The measure failed, though because it required 2/3 approval to pass, according to the provisions of California's Proposition 13, a state constitutional amendment approved by the voters in 1978.

== Schools ==
- Benicia High School
- Benicia Middle School
- Joe Henderson Elementary School
- Mary Farmar Elementary School
- Matthew Turner Elementary School
- Robert Semple Elementary School
- Liberty High School, an alternative high school for students who "enter the school behind in credits and not on track for graduation".

Former Schools

- Mills Elementary School (1951-2005)
