= Armond Armstead =

American gridiron football player (born 1990)

No. 97
- Position: Defensive tackle

Personal information
- Born: August 3, 1990 (age 36); Sacramento, California, U.S.
- Listed height: 6 ft 5 in (1.96 m)
- Listed weight: 305 lb (138 kg)

Career information
- High school: Pleasant Grove (Elk Grove, California)
- College: USC
- NFL draft: 2012: undrafted

Career history
- Toronto Argonauts (2012); New England Patriots (2013)

Awards and highlights
- Grey Cup champion (2012); CFL All-Star (2012); CFL East All-Star (2012)

Career CFL statistics
- Total tackles: 43
- Sacks: 6
- Stats at CFL.ca (archived)
- Stats at Pro Football Reference

Armond Armstead (born August 3, 1990) is a former defensive tackle for the Toronto Argonauts of the Canadian Football League (CFL) and the New England Patriots of the National Football League (NFL). He played college football at USC. He was signed by the Argonauts as an undrafted free agent in 2012.

== High school football ==
Armstead played high school football at Pleasant Grove High in Elk Grove, California. His honors included Super Prep All-American, Prep Star All-American, Super Prep All-Farwest, Prep Star All-West, Long Beach Press-Telegram Best in the West honorable mention, Tacoma News Tribune Western 100, Cal-Hi Sports All-State first team, All-Northern California, Sacramento Bee All-Metro and All-Metro League MVP as a senior defensive and offensive lineman at Pleasant Grove High in Elk Grove (Calif.). He had 88 tackles and 11 sacks in 2007. As a junior in 2006, he had 79 tackles and 5 sacks.

== College football ==
Armstead attended the University of Southern California, playing three seasons from 2008 to 2010, starting 17 games and recording 59 tackles. However after an initially undisclosed injury, USC's staff refused to medically clear him to play in 2011. He later sued the school, accusing team doctors of giving him painkillers (Toradol) that caused a heart attack and damaged his future earning potential. He went undrafted in the 2012 NFL draft.

== Professional football ==
=== Toronto Argonauts ===
In 2012, Armstead was signed by the Toronto Argonauts of the Canadian Football League. In his rookie CFL season, Armstead compiled 43 defensive tackles, 2 special teams tackles, and 6 quarterback sacks. He was also named as a CFL All-star, and went on to win the 100th Grey Cup with the Argonauts that season. On January 4, 2013, Armstead was released by the Argonauts per request in order to pursue an NFL career.

=== New England Patriots ===
On January 22, 2013, he signed with the New England Patriots. Per the terms of the NFL Collective Bargaining Agreement, the Patriots were required to sign Armstead, an undrafted free agent, to a three-year deal at the standard salaries of $405,000 for 2013, $495,000 for 2014, and $585,000 in 2015. While the contract did not include a signing bonus, nearly half the contract was guaranteed: his entire salary for 2013 is guaranteed, and $250,000 of his 2014 salary. On July 29, 2013, Armstead underwent surgery to treat an undisclosed infection. On August 26, 2013, he was placed on the reserve/non-football injury list. On July 16, 2014, he announced his retirement from football at the age of 23.

== Personal life ==
Armstead's brother, Arik Armstead, played college football at Oregon and is currently on the Jacksonville Jaguars.
