= Northern California Band Association =

Marching band judging association

- Abbreviation: NCBA
- Formation: 1990; 36 years ago
- Type: Performing arts organization
- Tax ID no.: 68-0271748
- Legal status: 501(c)(3) organization
- Headquarters: Stockton, California
- Region served: United States
- President: Christy Latham
- Website: www.ncbaonline.net

The Northern California Band Association (NCBA) is a regional organization that hosts competitive events for middle and high school music programs in the Northern/Central California and Northern Nevada area. NCBA was established in 1990-1991 by music directors in Northern California to provide an organization that could judge the many diverse marching band competitions that were being run by independent organizations. The goal was to provide consistency and a slate of judges. These competitions include band reviews, winter shows, and other spring activities throughout the year. Since its inception the organization has grown to around 200 members.

== Fall Activities ==
During the fall season, band reviews are hosted from different high schools which encompass parade, field show, concert band, and jazz band. All competitions are divided up into different divisions with classifications determined by the number of performers. Between all fall marching categories, multiple schools within the same district may also combine to compete, though they are required to compete in the open division, regardless of band size.

=== Parade ===
The Parade category is divided up into two distinct classifications, Traditional Parade and Parade Show Bands. Of those, there are eight divisions in the traditional classification and two in the show category.

Along with the primary parade event, there are optional "Competing Units" that bands may participate in. These include Drum Major, Parade Auxiliary (color guard), and Street Percussion.

- Street Percussion is an optional competition involving battery and other percussive instruments. These may include marching xylophones, glockenspiels, or other auxiliary percussive instruments. Much like indoor percussion, groups are free to incorporate movement or drill into their performance, provided at least one performer maintains forward momentum throughout. Street Percussion units are composed of members from the competing parade band, and performers may switch from their parade instruments to their designated street percussion instruments. Grounded or wheeled instruments are not permitted.

=== Field Show ===
The Field Show category consists of marching bands performing adjudicated productions on a football field. Along with traditional marching instruments, ensembles often also include a front ensemble, or pit, which is typically made up of melodic percussion and auxiliary instruments. The Field Show category is divided up into six divisions. Some band reviews may separate the field show competition off-site to a nearby stadium. Bands must have a minimum of a 5 minute show, with the timing beginning with the start of the first note, spoken word, or audio and ending, indicated by a final salute to the judges.

Optional Competing Units include, Field Conductor, Color guard, Percussion, Brass, and Woodwinds.

=== Concert & Jazz ===
Both categories include five divisions with events with less than ten entries may combine divisions.

== Winter Activities ==
Similar to the Fall season, NCBA hosts indoor competitions in Guard, Percussion, Drum Major, and Winds Categories. They operate as circuit partners for both Winter Guard International (WGI) and Peacock's American Drum Major organizations. As a WGI Circuit Partner, the organization follows and utilizes WGI rules and adjudication sheets. Winter competitions typically begin in early February and ending in April with championships at Del Oro High School. In addition to standard divisions, NCBA employs sub-classifications within its Regional A division. These sub-divisions separate ensembles into more similar performance levels. This allows for newer or rebuilding programs to compete against comparable groups rather than more established Regional A programs.

=== Guard ===
The Winter Guard category features color guard ensembles and utilizes the WGI classifications of divisions as well as additional NCBA's Scholastic Sub-Classes.

=== Percussion ===
The Winter Percussion category consists of indoor percussion ensembles featuring both battery and front ensemble instrumentations. NCBA utilizes both the WGI classifications as well as extra Scholastic Sub-Classes of divisions.

=== Drum Major ===
The Drum Major category is an individual competitive event including parade drum majors under the classification of Mace or Military and Field Conducting.

=== Winds ===
The Winds category includes indoor wind ensembles that integrate brass and woodwind instrumentation with movement and visual elements. Winter Winds follows the same WGI classifications with no additional sub-classes of divisions.
