= National Register of Historic Places listings in Solano County, California =

Location of Solano County in California

This is a list of the National Register of Historic Places listings in Solano County, California.

This is intended to be a complete list of the properties and districts on the National Register of Historic Places in Solano County, California, United States. Latitude and longitude coordinates are provided for many National Register properties and districts; these locations may be seen together in an online map.

There are 33 properties and districts listed on the National Register in the county, including 1 National Historic Landmark.

This National Park Service list is complete through NPS recent listings posted November 13, 2026.

== Current listings ==
	Name on the Register	Image	Date listed	Location	City or town	Description
1	Benicia Arsenal	Benicia Arsenal	November 7, 1976 (#76000534)	Army Point and I-680; 38°03′12″N 122°08′03″W	Benicia	
2	Benicia Capitol State Historic Park	Benicia Capitol State Historic Park	February 12, 1971 (#71000204)	1st and G Sts. 38°03′00″N 122°09′32″W	Benicia	
3	Benicia City Cemetery	Benicia City Cemetery	February 1, 2021 (#100006087)	Bounded by Riverhill Dr., Riverview Terr., Shirley Dr., and Incline Pl. 38°03′28″N 122°09′10″W	Benicia	
4	Benicia Southern Pacific Railroad Passenger Depot	Benicia Southern Pacific Railroad Passenger Depot	September 28, 2017 (#100001664)	90 1st St. 38°02′41″N 122°09′44″W	Benicia	
5	Bird and Dinkelspiel Store	Bird and Dinkelspiel Store	October 21, 1999 (#99001264)	2145 Collinsville Rd. 38°07′58″N 121°52′16″W	Birds Landing	General store built in 1875.
6	Jackson Fay Brown House	Jackson Fay Brown House	November 7, 2002 (#02001289)	6751 Maine Prairie Rd. 38°19′59″N 121°48′50″W	Dixon	
7	Will H. Buck House	Will H. Buck House	October 24, 1985 (#85003372)	301 Buck Ave. 38°21′23″N 121°59′42″W	Vacaville	
8	Carr House	Carr House	September 13, 1979 (#79000555)	165 E. D St; 38°02′48″N 122°09′32″W	Benicia	demolished circa 2000
9	Vallejo City Hall	Vallejo City Hall	August 13, 2013 (#13000591)	715 Marin St. 38°06′09″N 122°15′25″W	Vallejo	
10	Crooks Mansion	Crooks Mansion	November 14, 1978 (#78000795)	285 W. G St. 38°03′06″N 122°09′44″W	Benicia	
11	Dixon Carnegie Library	Dixon Carnegie Library	February 4, 2011 (#10001199)	135 E. B St. 38°26′48″N 121°49′20″W	Dixon	California Carnegie Libraries MPS
12	Firma Lodge No. 27		September 29, 2026 (#100013461)	1209 Georgia Street; 38°06′03″N 122°14′34″W	Vallejo	
13	Joseph Fischer House	Joseph Fischer House	May 24, 1979 (#79000556)	135 G St. 38°03′01″N 122°09′34″W	Benicia	
14	Daniel Webster Harrier House	Daniel Webster Harrier House	December 8, 2015 (#15000860)	739 Ohio St. 38°06′25″N 122°15′13″W	Vallejo	
15	Hastings Adobe	Hastings Adobe	June 13, 1972 (#72000260)	Northeast of Collinsville off CA 68; 38°04′35″N 121°49′54″W	Collinsville	
16	LCS-102 (landing craft support)	LCS-102 (landing craft support)	October 13, 2015 (#15000716)	7th & Nimitz Sts., Mare Island; 38°06′05″N 122°16′11″W	Vallejo	
17	Mare Island Naval Shipyard	Mare Island Naval Shipyard	May 15, 1975 (#75002103)	Mare Island; 38°05′24″N 122°15′48″W	Vallejo	Boundary increase (added January 21, 1997): Mare Island Historic District, Vallejo, California
18	Samuel Martin House	Samuel Martin House	May 26, 1977 (#77000349)	293 Suisun Valley Rd. 38°14′08″N 122°07′35″W	Fairfield	1861 home of early Solano County settler; also known as Stonedene
19	Masonic Temple-Naval Lodge No. 87, Free and Accepted Masons	Masonic Temple-Naval Lodge No. 87, Free and Accepted Masons	August 7, 2013 (#13000575)	707 Marin St. 38°06′08″N 122°15′25″W	Vallejo	
20	Old Masonic Hall	Old Masonic Hall	March 16, 1972 (#72000259)	106 W. J St. 38°03′08″N 122°09′27″W	Benicia	
21	Pena Adobe	Pena Adobe	January 7, 1972 (#72000261)	2 miles (3.2 km) southwest of Vacaville on I-80; 38°20′11″N 122°00′54″W	Vacaville	
22	Pleasants Ranch		April 7, 2006 (#06000280)	8212 Pleasants Valley Rd. 38°27′50″N 122°03′00″W	Vacaville	
23	Sacramento Northern Railway Historic District	Sacramento Northern Railway Historic District	July 11, 2012 (#12000402)	5848 State Highway 12; 38°12′14″N 121°52′31″W	Suisun City	
24	Saint Vincent's Hill Historic District	Saint Vincent's Hill Historic District	November 21, 2003 (#03001168)	Roughly bounded by Mare Island Way almost to Sonoma Blvd. and from Quincy Alley to Kissel Alley; 38°06′20″N 122°15′30″W	Vallejo	
25	STAMBOUL (Whaling Bark)	STAMBOUL (Whaling Bark)	November 2, 1988 (#88002030)	Foot of W. 12th St. 38°03′44″N 122°10′47″W	Benicia	
26	Suisun Masonic Lodge No. 55	Suisun Masonic Lodge No. 55	December 18, 1978 (#78000798)	623 Main St. 38°14′19″N 122°02′27″W	Suisun City	
27	USCGC STORIS (cutter)	USCGC STORIS (cutter)	December 31, 2012 (#12001110)	U.S. Maritime Administration National Defense Reserve Fleet, Suisun Bay; 38°05′05″N 122°05′04″W	Benicia	
28	Vacaville Town Hall	Vacaville Town Hall	September 18, 1978 (#78000799)	620 E. Main St. 38°21′23″N 121°59′09″W	Vacaville	
29	Vallejo City Hall and County Building Branch	Vallejo City Hall and County Building Branch	November 7, 1976 (#76000535)	734 Marin St. 38°06′10″N 122°15′23″W	Vallejo	
30	Vallejo Old City Historic District	Vallejo Old City Historic District	March 20, 1973 (#73000460)	Sonoma Blvd., and Monterey, Carolina, and York Sts. 38°06′07″N 122°14′59″W	Vallejo	
31	Von Pfister General Store	Von Pfister General Store	June 24, 2015 (#15000360)	Von Pfister Alley (waterfront between C and D Streets); 38°02′50″N 122°09′41″W	Benicia	
32	Wednesday Club of Suisun	Wednesday Club of Suisun	December 29, 2022 (#100007819)	225 Sacramento St. 38°14′21″N 122°02′33″W	Suisun City	
33	Westminster Presbyterian Church and Cemetery of Tremont	Westminster Presbyterian Church and Cemetery of Tremont	March 26, 2018 (#100002240)	8290 Tremont Rd. 38°29′42″N 121°42′16″W	Dixon	

== See also ==
- List of National Historic Landmarks in California
- National Register of Historic Places listings in California
- California Historical Landmarks in Solano County, California
