= William H. Strayer =

American soldier in the U.S. Army

- Born: William Henry Strayer; October 17, 1847; Maytown, Pennsylvania, United States
- Died: January 29, 1876 (aged 28); Bainbridge, Pennsylvania
- Burial place: Camp Hill Cemetery, Mount Joy, Pennsylvania
- Military career
- Allegiance: US
- Branch: United States Army
- Service years: c. 1872–1874
- Rank: Private
- Unit: 3rd U.S. Cavalry
- Conflicts: Indian Wars
- Awards: Medal of Honor

Private William H. Strayer (October 17, 1847 – January 29, 1876) was an American soldier in the U.S. Army who served with the 3rd U.S. Cavalry during the Indian Wars in Nebraska. He was one of four men, along with Sergeant John H. Foley, First Sergeant Leroy Vokes and civilian scout William F. "Buffalo Bill" Cody, awarded the Medal of Honor for gallantry in action against a Miniconjou Sioux raiding party at the Loupe Fork of the Platte River on April 26, 1872.

== Biography ==
Born in 1847, in Maytown, Pennsylvania, Strayer enlisted in the United States Army in nearby Carlisle and was assigned to Company B of the 3rd U.S. Cavalry Regiment as a private. Sent out west to the frontier, he was later stationed at Fort McPherson, Nebraska under the command of Colonel Joseph J. Reynolds and saw action during the Indian wars in Nebraska during the early 1870s.

On April 25, 1872, Strayer left the fort with the rest of Company B led by Captain Charles Meinhold on the trail of a band of Miniconjou Sioux who had raided the McPherson station on the Union Pacific Railroad, located approximately five miles from the fort, killing several men and stealing a large number of horses. The regiment was guided by civilian scout William F. "Buffalo Bill" Cody and caught up to the Indian raiders the following morning, discovering their camp near the Loupe Fork (near present-day Stapleton, Nebraska) of the Platte River. Upon reaching the Loupe Fork, Captain Meinhold sent Cody and a detachment of ten soldiers under Sergeant John H. Foley for reconnaissance of the south bank of the river while the main force crossed to the north side.

Cody skillfully guided the soldiers to within fifty yards of the Sioux camp before being discovered. Though outnumbered two-to-one, Foley decided to attack the raiders rather than risk them escaping. Strayer was among the troopers who followed Sergeant Foley's charge into the camp and, according to a later report by Meinhold, "bravely closed in upon an Indian while he was fired at several times, and wounded him". Three of the Indian raiders were killed, one by Cody and two others chased down by the main cavalry force as they attempted to flee, while six others out hunting were alerted by the gunfire and successfully escaped. With the Sioux raiding party broken up, Strayer and the three men who fought beside him, William Cody and Sergeants John Foley and Leroy Vokes, were cited for "gallantry in action" and awarded the Medal of Honor on May 22, 1872. After his discharge from Camp Sheridan on December 18, 1874, Strayer disappeared like so many other MOH recipients from the period. No subsequent public records, including pension or medical files, have been found.

== Medal of Honor citation ==
Rank and organization: Private, Company B, 3d U.S. Cavalry. Place and date: At Loupe Forke, Platte River, Nebr., 26 April 1872. Entered service at: --. Birth: Maytown, Pa. Date of issue: 22 May 1872.

Citation:

Gallantry in action.

== See also ==
- List of Medal of Honor recipients for the Indian Wars
