= Saint Paul's Episcopal Church (Benicia, California) =

Historical place in Solano County, United States

Saint Paul's Episcopal Church of Benicia
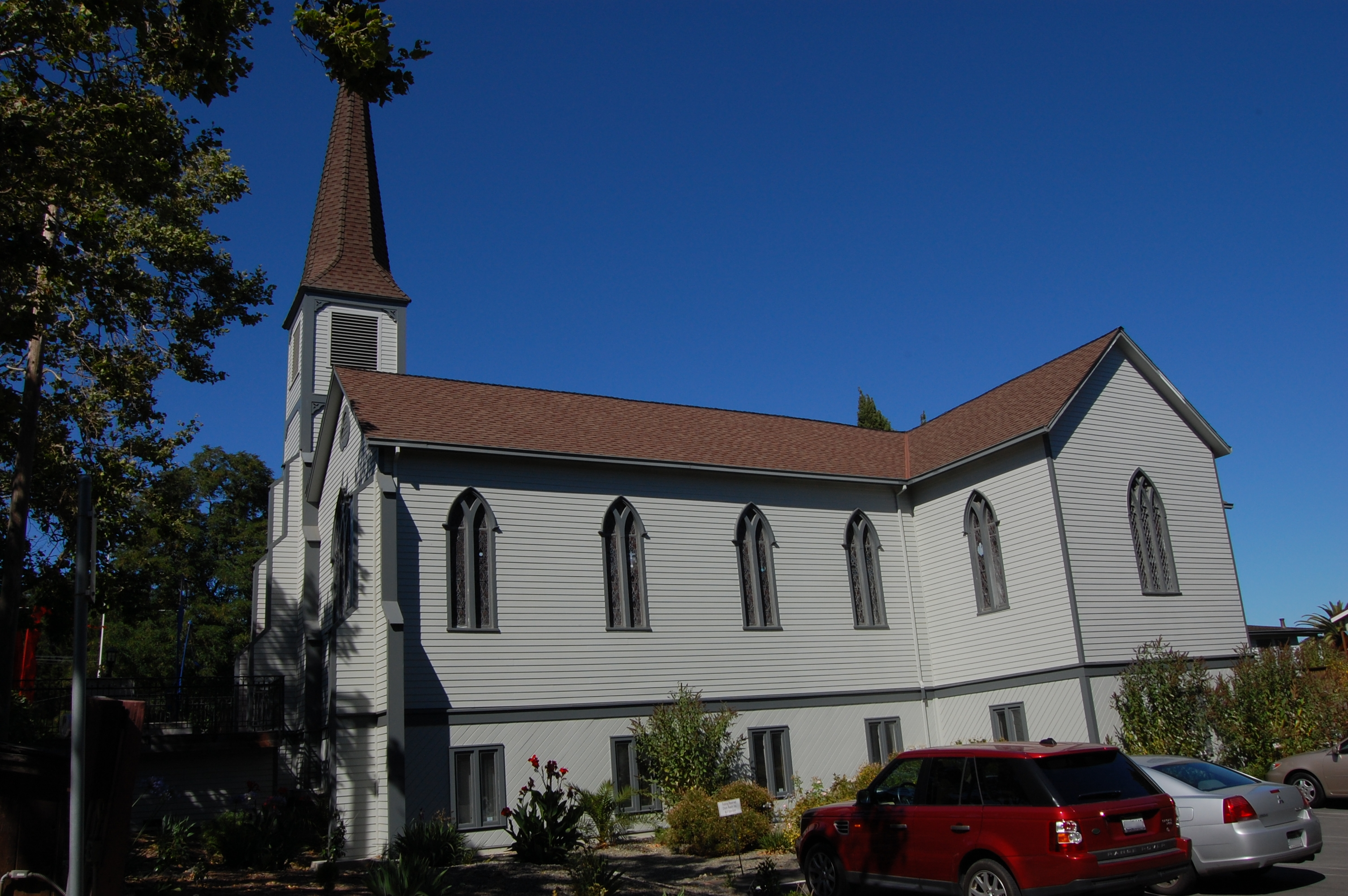
- Saint Paul's Episcopal Church

- Location within California Location within the United States
- 38.0519°N 122.1567°W
- Location: 120 E J Street, Benicia, California

History
- Built: 1859, 167 years ago

Site notes
- Architect: Gothic ecclesiastical architecture.
- Architectural style: Gothic architecture
- Governing body: Saint Paul's Episcopal Church stpaulsbenicia.org

California Historical Landmark
- Designated: July 20, 1973
- Reference no.: 862

Saint Paul's Episcopal Church of Benicia is historical church Building built in 1859 in Benicia, California in Solano County, California. The Saint Paul's Episcopal Church is a California Historical Landmark No. 862 listed on July 20, 1973. Saint Paul's Episcopal Church was designed Lt. Julian McAllister and built by shipwrights of the Pacific Mail Steamship Company. Saint Paul's Episcopal Church is built in the early California Gothic ecclesiastical architecture. The church as dedicated on February 12, 1860, 166 years ago, by the church's first pastor Rev. William Ingraham and is still open. The church was founded on September 24, 1854 171 years ago, by Major F. D. Townsend, with the US Army in the Benicia State Capital Building.

A historical marker is at Saint Paul's Episcopal Church of Benicia. The marker was placed there by The Historic Landmarks Committee, Grand Parlor, Native Sons of the Golden West. Benicia Parlor No.89, Native Sons of the Golden West and Benicia Parlor No.287, Native Daughters of the Golden West on October 17, 1954.

== See also ==
- California Historical Landmarks in Solano County
