= University of California Wolfskill Experimental Orchards =

Historical place in Solano County, United States

Wolfskill Grant Orchards University of California Wolfskill Experimental Orchards
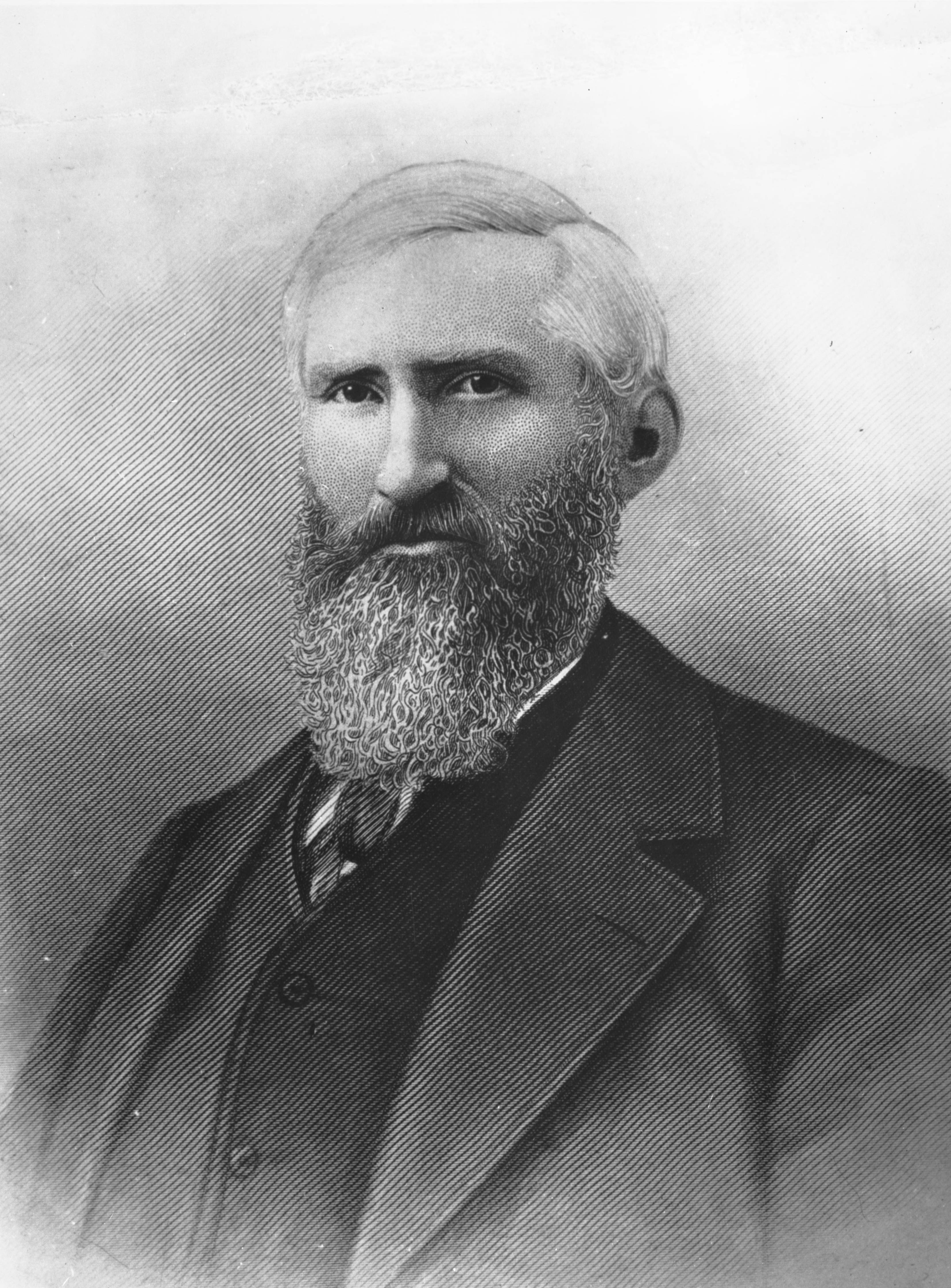
- John Wolfskill founder of Wolfskill Grant Orchards

- Location within California Location within the United States
- 38.5046°N 121.9805°W
- Location: Putah Creek Road, Winters, California

History
- Built: 1842, 184 years ago, Wolfskill; 1938, 88 years ago University of California

Site notes
- Architect: John R. Wolfskill (John Reed)
- Governing body: UC Davis

California Historical Landmark
- Designated: June 28, 1965
- Reference no.: 804

Wolfskill Grant Orchards is historical site built in 1842 in Winters, California in Solano County, California. The Wolfskill Grantis a California Historical Landmark No. 804 listed on June 28, 1965. Horticulturist John R. Wolfskill (1804-1897) settled on land of the Rancho Rio de los Putos a First Mexican Republic California Land Grant near the present-day City of Winters in 1842 after marriage to Magdalena Lugo. Wolfskill, also called John Reed, brought with him seeds and plant cuttings and started new horticulture fruit industry in Northern California. Wolfskill came west on the Santa Fe Trail. Wolfskill worked at teamster in Santa Fe, New Mexico before coming west. John Reid Wolfskill was born on 11 September 1804, in Madison, Kentucky. Wolfskill married Susan Cooper on January 10, 1860, in Colusa, California. Wolfskill died on May 27, 1897, in Yolo, California at the age of 92. In 1938, Wolfskill daughter, Mrs. Frances Wolfskill Taylor Wilson donated 107.28 acres of Wolfskill plant nursery and orchard University of California. University of California opened the University of California Experimental Farm on the University of California, Davis land part of the UC Davis Plant Sciences Department.

- A historical marker is at University of California Experimental Farm. The marker was placed there by California State Park Commission, the Solano County Historical Society in 1966.
- Uncle Burt's Tree is marker nearby placed by Vacaville Historical Marker Committee in 2002.

== See also ==
- California Historical Landmarks in Solano County
