= California Historical Landmarks in Solano County =

This list includes properties and districts listed on the California Historical Landmark listing in Solano County, California. Click the "Map of all coordinates" link to the right to view a Google map of all properties and districts with latitude and longitude coordinates in the table below.

Image		Landmark name	Location	City or town	Summary
Benicia Arsenal	176	Benicia Arsenal	Adams and Jefferson Sts. 38°03′15″N 122°08′08″W	Benicia	Also on the NRHP list as NPS-76000534
Benicia Barracks	177	Benicia Barracks	Francesca Terrace Park; 38°03′23″N 122°08′17″W	Benicia	
Benicia Capitol	153	Benicia Capitol	1st and G Sts. 38°03′01″N 122°09′28″W	Benicia	
Benicia Lodge No. 5	174	Benicia Lodge No. 5	110 W. J. St. 38°03′09″N 122°09′27″W	Benicia	
Benicia Seminary	795	Benicia Seminary	City park 38°03′14″N 122°09′23″W	Benicia	
First Presbyterian Church of Benicia	175	First Presbyterian Church of Benicia	Benicia City Park; 38°03′13″N 122°09′26″W	Benicia	Site is now Benicia City Park, on K Street.
First U.S. Naval Station in the Pacific	751	First U.S. Naval Station in the Pacific	Mare Island Naval Shipyard; 38°05′24″N 122°15′48″W	Vallejo	Also on the NRHP list as NPS-75002103
Fischer-Hanlon House	880	Fischer-Hanlon House	135 W. G. St. Benicia Capitol State Historic Park; 38°03′01″N 122°09′32″W	Benicia	
Former California State Capitol	574	Former California State Capitol	Vallejo Station; 38°06′00″N 122°15′33″W	Vallejo	Lost in August 20, 1859 fire
Matthew Turner Shipyard Park	973	Matthew Turner Shipyard Park	Matthew Turner Shipyard Park; 38°03′44″N 122°10′45″W	Benicia	
Rockville Stone Chapel	779	Rockville Stone Chapel	Rockville Cemetery, Suisun Valley Rd. 38°14′50″N 122°07′16″W	Rockville	
Saint Paul's Episcopal Church	862	Saint Paul's Episcopal Church	120 E J St. at 1st St. 38°03′06″N 122°09′24″W	Benicia	
University of California Experimental Farm	804	University of California Experimental Farm	Putah Creek Rd. 38°30′17″N 121°58′50″W	Winters	Also called Wolfskill Grant
Vaca-Peña Adobe	534	Vaca-Peña Adobe	Peña Adobe Park; 38°20′15″N 122°00′55″W	Vacaville	Also on the NRHP list as NPS-72000261

== See also ==
- List of California Historical Landmarks
- National Register of Historic Places listings in Solano County, California
