= Shiloh wind power plant =

Wind farm in Solano County

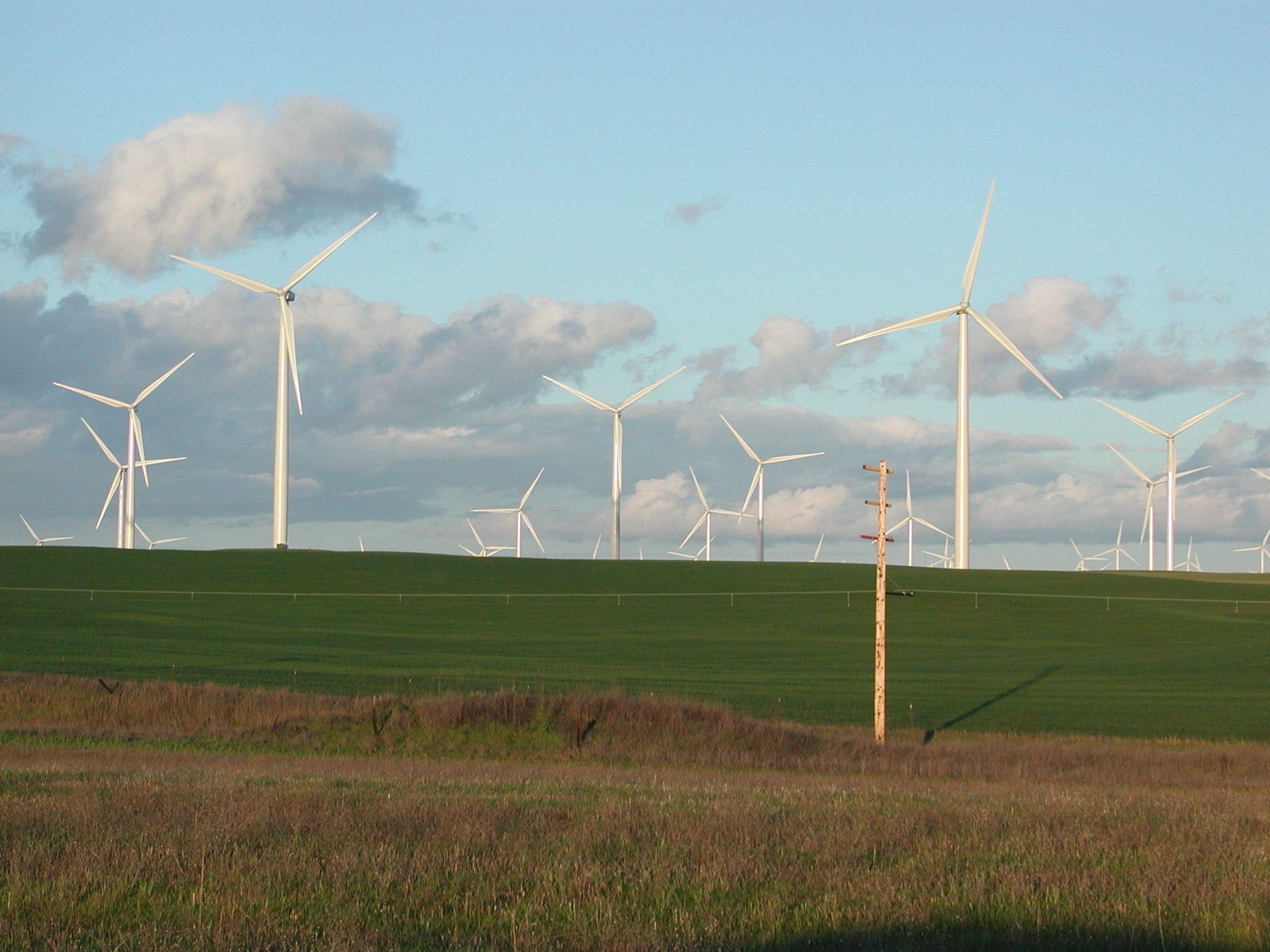
- Some of the 1.5 MW Phase I turbines stand 80 metres (260 ft) tall. The surrounding land is used for sheep grazing and growing hay.
- Country: United States
- Coordinates: 38°6′32″N 121°50′42″W
- Construction began: August 2005
- Commission date: Apr 2006 (Phase I); Feb 2009 (Phase II); Sep 2011 (Phase III); Sep 2012 (Phase IV)
- Construction cost: US$220,000,000 (equivalent to $343,100,000 in 2024) in 2006 (Phase I)
- Owners: Avangrid Renewables (Phase I); EDF Renewables (Phases II–IV)

Wind farm
- Hub height: 65 to 80 metres (213 to 262 ft)
- Rotor diameter: 77 metres (253 ft)
- Site area: 6,800 acres (2,800 ha) (Phase I); 6,100 acres (2,500 ha) (Phase II); 4,600 acres (1,900 ha) (Phase III); ? (Phase IV)

Power generation
- Units operational: 100 (Phase I); 75 (Phase II); 50 (Phase III); 50 (Phase IV)
- Nameplate capacity: 150 MW (Phase I); 150 MW (Phase II); 102.5 MW (Phase III); 102.5 MW (Phase IV)

External links
- Website: Phase I; Phase II; Phase III; Phase IV
- Commons: Related media on Commons

The Shiloh wind power plant is a wind farm in the Montezuma Hills of Solano County, California, close to Bird's Landing and Collinsville, 40 miles (64 km) northeast of San Francisco. It has a nameplate capacity of 505 megawatts (MW) of power and was built in four stages between 2005 and 2012. Several additional projects are also in the Montezuma.

== Overview ==
Plant	Operator	Nameplate Capacity (MW)	Size (acres)	Commissioned	Cost (Millions $)
Shiloh I	Iberdrola	150	6,800	April 2006	279
Shiloh II	EDF Group	150	6,100	Jan 2009	
Shiloh III	EDF Group	102.5	4,500	Dec 2011	
Shiloh IV	EDF Group	102.5	3,102	Dec 2012	
High Winds LLC	FPL	162		Dec 2003	
EDF Renewables Windfarm V (Repower V Wind)	EDF Group	9		Mar 2006	
FPL Energy Montezuma	NextEra	36.8	1,466	2010	
Montezuma Wind II	NextEra	78.2	2,539	2011	
Solano Wind	SMUD	230	5,400	2007, 2012	

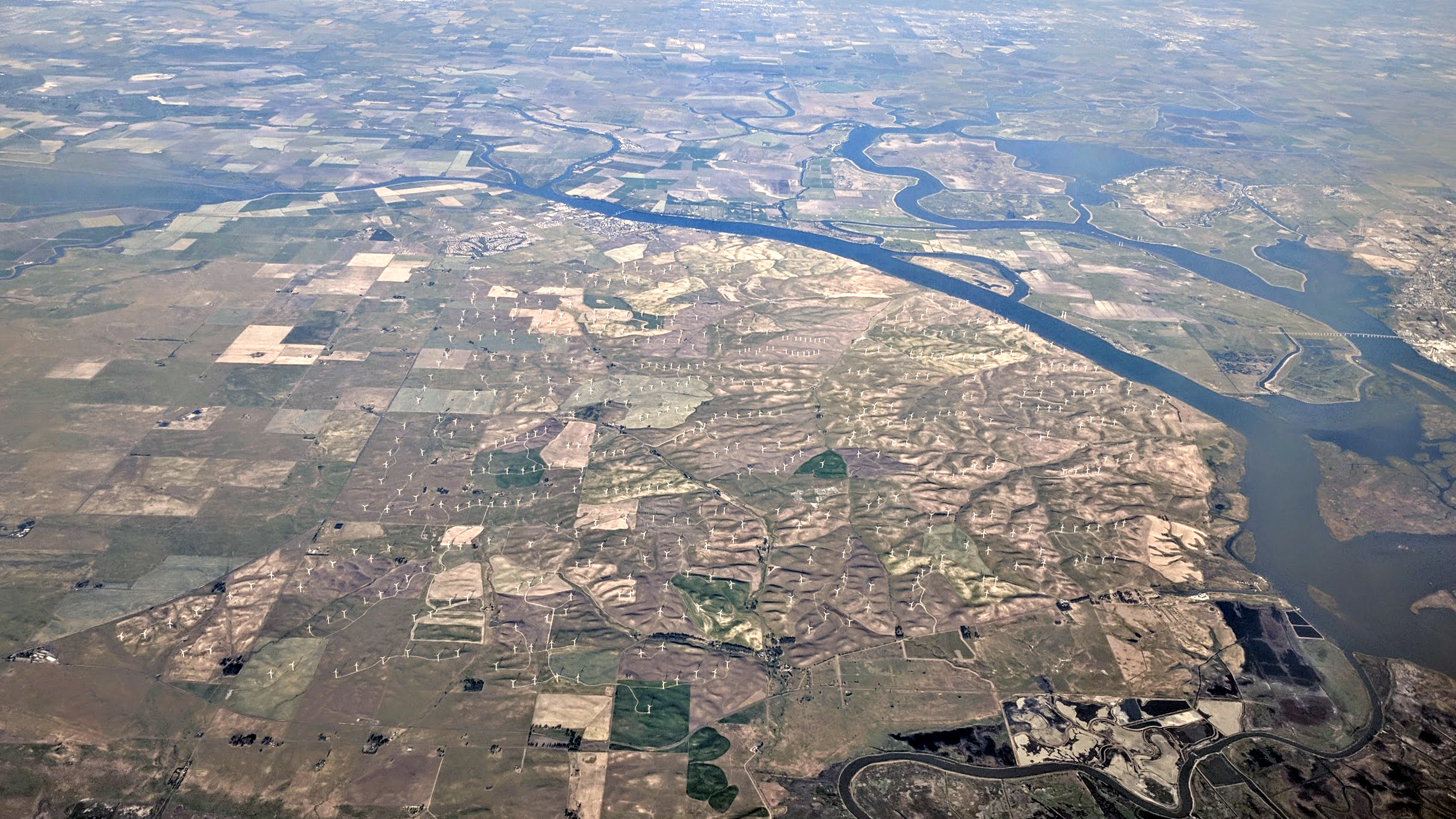
Aerial view (facing east)

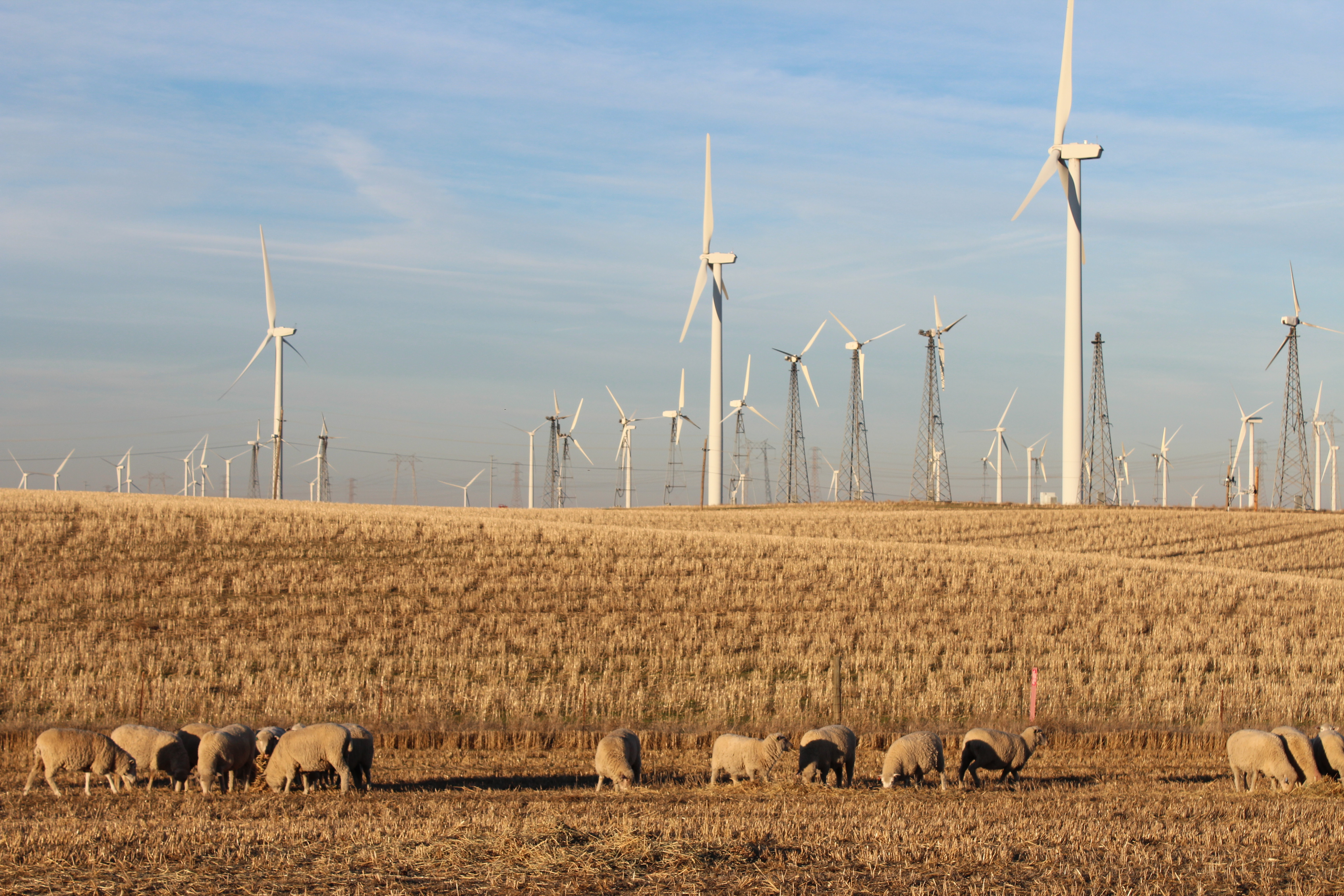
Sheep graze near old and new turbines at Shiloh IV

== Shiloh I ==
PPM Energy acquired the project, which had already received all the required permits, from enXco in May 2005. Construction started in August 2005 and was completed in April 2006. The first phase of the wind farm consists of 100 GE 1.5 MW wind turbines. They are spread across 6,800 acres (2,800 ha) of rolling hills and cost roughly US$220,000,000 (equivalent to $343,100,000 in 2024) to build. The turbines are owned by Iberdrola Renewables (formerly known as PPM Energy) and the electricity is sold to Pacific Gas and Electric (75 MW), the Modesto Irrigation District (50 MW), and the City of Palo Alto (25 MW).

The land for the turbines is leased from 26 local landowners, who continue to use it for sheep grazing and growing hay. Of the 100 turbines, 76 towers are 80 metres (260 ft) tall, and 24 towers are 65 metres (213 ft) tall. The turbine rotors have a diameter of 77 metres (253 ft) and rotate at a rate of 11–20 revolutions per minute.

== Shiloh II ==
EnXco started commercial operation of the 150-megawatt Shiloh II wind farm in February 2009 on 6,100 acres (2,500 ha) of land. The wind farm has 75 REpower MM92 turbines, each generating up to 2 megawatts. It produces enough energy for 74,000 homes. EnXco has a 20-year contract to sell the power to Pacific Gas and Electric Co.

== Shiloh III ==
The Shiloh III project went online in early 2012 with fifty REpower 2.05 MW turbines, generating 102.5 MW. The power is sold to Pacific Gas and Electric Company under a 20-year agreement.

== Shiloh IV ==
Shiloh IV became operational in December 2012, and like Shiloh III, consists of fifty REpower 2.05 MW turbines, generating 102.5 MW. The power is sold to Pacific Gas and Electric Company under a 25-year purchase agreement. Shiloh IV involved removal of about 235 existing Kenetech 100 kW turbines, originally installed in 1989 with a capacity of 25 MW. This wind farm has a permit from the United States Fish and Wildlife Service which allows for the death of 5 eagles per 5 years because of a collision with a turbine, without facing the penalties outlined by the Bald and Golden Eagle Protection Act. The permit outlines the requirements of the project owner to minimize and offset those eagle deaths with the goal of no-net loss to the eagle population.
