= John H. Foley =

Irish-born soldier in the U.S. Army

- Born: 1839; Cork, Ireland
- Died: November 18, 1874 (aged 35); Benicia, California, United States
- Burial place: Benicia Arsenal Post Cemetery
- Military career
- Allegiance: United States
- Branch: United States Army
- Service years: c. 1872–1873
- Rank: Sergeant
- Unit: 3rd U.S. Cavalry
- Conflicts: Indian Wars
- Awards: Medal of Honor

Sergeant John H. Foley (1839 – November 18, 1874) was an Irish-born soldier in the U.S. Army who served with the 3rd U.S. Cavalry during the Indian Wars. He was one of four men received the Medal of Honor for gallantry in leading an attack against the Sioux Indians near Loupe Fork of the Platte River in Nebraska on April 26, 1872.

== Biography ==
John H. Foley was born in Cork, Ireland in 1839. He later emigrated to the United States and enlisted in the U.S. Army in Boston, Massachusetts. Joining Company B of the 3rd U.S. Cavalry, he served on frontier duty in Nebraska during the early 1870s and eventually reached the rank of sergeant. On April 23, 1872, Foley was among the cavalry troopers under Captain Charles Meinhold who left Fort McPherson to pursue a band of hostile Miniconjou Sioux. Upon reaching the South Loup River (near present-day Stapleton, Nebraska) the following day, Meinhold ordered Foley and civilian scout William F. "Buffalo Bill" Cody to take 10 men and search the south bend of the river while the main force crossed to the north side. Cody managed to take Foley and his men within 50 yards of the Sioux camp, located near Loupe Fork of the Platte River, before their presence was discovered. Foley then led a charge into the enemy camp followed by fellow Sergeant Leroy H. Vokes, Private William H. Strayer and William Cody. In the ensuing shootout, Cody killed one Indian while another two were killed by Foley's men. Six other Sioux, who were hunting away from the camp, heard the gunfire and were able to escape. His commanding officer, Captain Meinhold, noted in his report that Foley had "charged into the Indian camp without knowing how many enemies he might encounter". All four men, including Foley, were recommended for the Medal of Honor for "gallantry in action" and received the award a month later. Foley died in Benicia, California on November 18, 1874, at the age of 35. He was interred at the Benicia Arsenal Post Cemetery.

== Medal of Honor citation ==
Rank and organization: Sergeant, Company B, 3d U.S. Cavalry. Place and date: At Loupe Fork, Platte River, Nebr., April 26, 1872. Entered service at:------. Birth: Ireland. Date of issue: May 22, 1872.

Citation:

Gallantry in action.

== See also ==
- List of Medal of Honor recipients for the Indian Wars
