= Benicia Arsenal =

- U.S. National Register of Historic Places
- California Historical Landmark
- California Historical Landmark
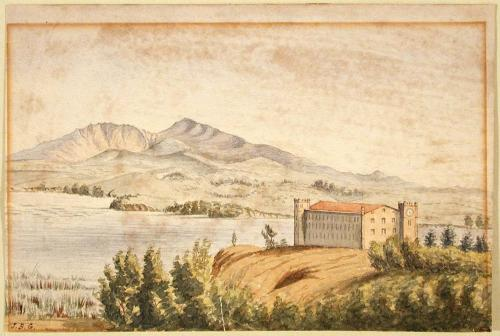
- Benicia Arsenal, California Mount Diablo in the Distance (watercolor by Joseph Basil Girard, Huntington Museum)
- Location: Benicia, California
- Coordinates: 38°3′14.53″N 122°8′8.02″W
- Built: 1849
- NRHP reference No.: 76000534
- CHISL No.: 176
- CHISL No.: 177
- Added to NRHP: November 7, 1976

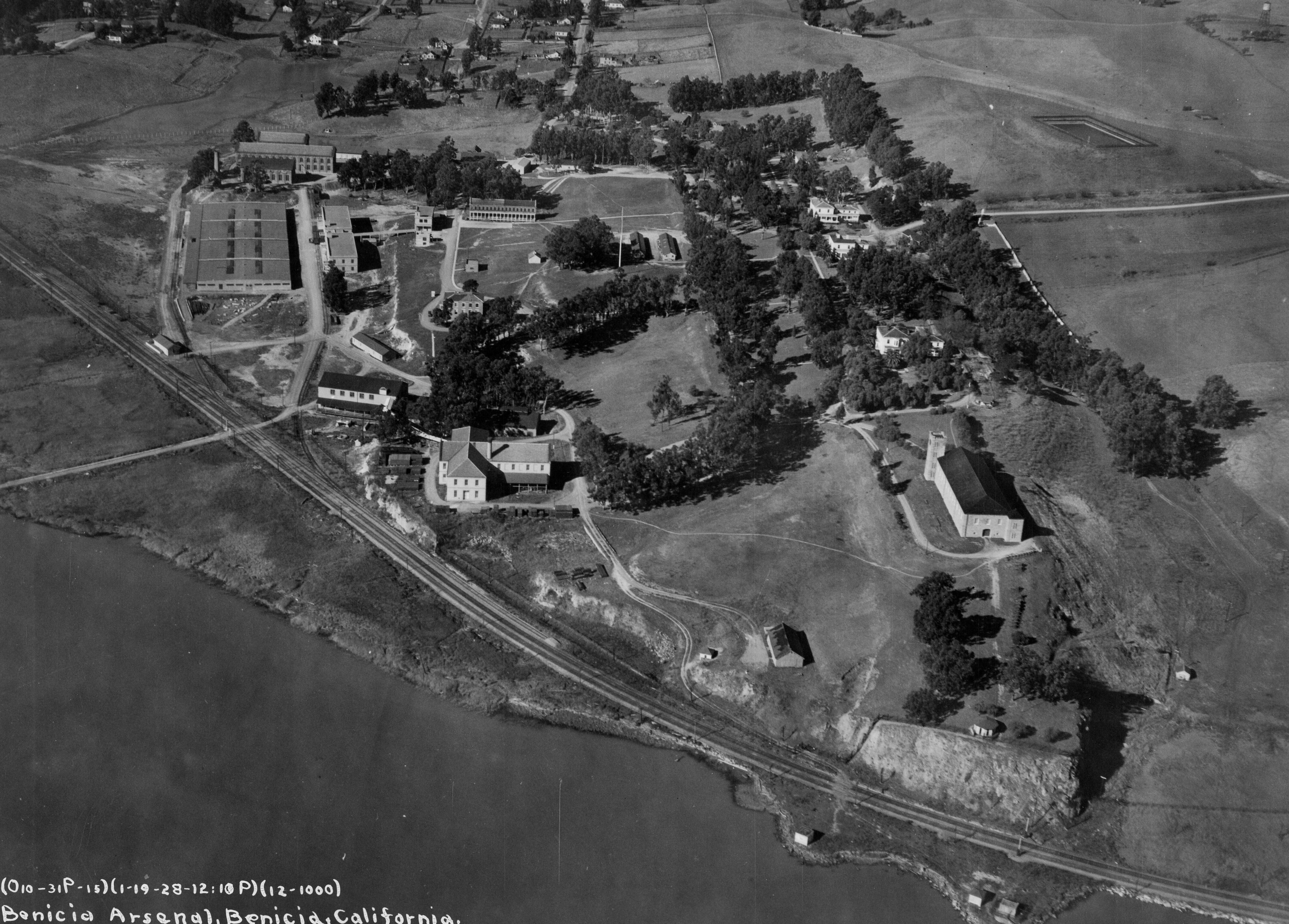
Benicia Arsenal in 1928

The Benicia Arsenal (1851–1964) and Benicia Barracks (1852–66) were part of a large military reservation located next to Suisun Bay in Benicia, California. For over 100 years, the arsenal was the primary US Army Ordnance facility for the West Coast of the United States.

In 1847 a 252-acre (102 ha) parcel of land adjoining the Benicia city limits on the east was acquired for a military reserve. First occupation of the post was on April 9, 1849, when two companies of the 2nd Infantry Regiment set up camp to establish Benicia Barracks, which also housed the 3rd Artillery Regiment. In 1851, after the urging of General Persifor F. Smith, the first Ordnance Supply Depot in the West was established in Benicia. In 1852 it was designated Benicia Arsenal. Notable military personnel who were stationed there during this time include Ulysses Grant, Edward Ord, and Joseph Hooker, among others.

The grounds of the Benicia Arsenal are also famous for stabling one of the elements of the Army's Camel Corps. The short-lived Camel Corps was disbanded in 1863, but the Camel Barns, built in 1855, remain and are now the Museum of History Benicia.

The Benicia Arsenal was a staging area during the Civil War for Union troops from the West, and the installation remained a garrisoned post until 1898 when troops were assigned to duty in the Philippines during the Spanish–American War. From 1911 to 1913, the arsenal was commanded by Colden Ruggles, who later served as the Army's Chief of Ordnance. During World War I, the Benicia Arsenal gave ordnance support to all large Army installations in the Western States as well as supplying Ordnance material to American expeditionary forces in Siberia. Italian Service Units of the 4th, 4th and 50th Italian Quartermaster Service Company worked at the Arsenal during World War II.

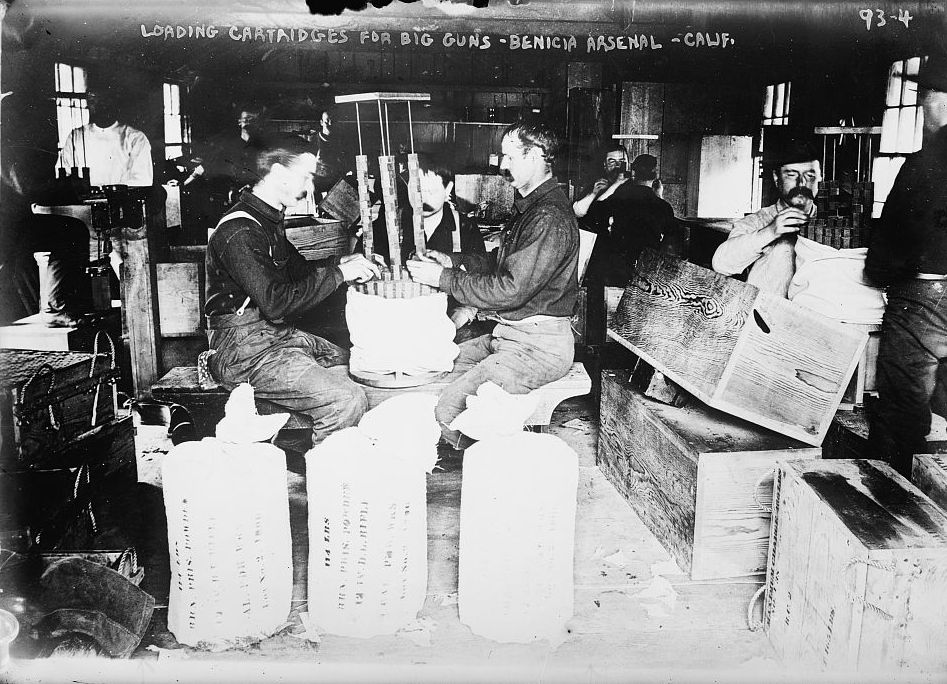
Workers loading cartridges for big guns at the arsenal

In the 24 hours following the Pearl Harbor bombing, 125 separate truck convoys were loaded and dispatched from the Benicia Arsenal, leaving its stock of ammunition, small arms, and high explosives completely exhausted. Throughout the war, the arsenal supplied ports with weapons, artillery, parts, supplies, and tools. In addition, the arsenal overhauled 14,343 pairs of binoculars, manufactured 180,000 small items for tanks and weapons, and repaired approximately 70,000 watches. However, the arsenal is most famous for supplying munitions to Lieutenant Colonel Jimmy Doolittle for the first bombing raid on Tokyo on April 18, 1942, launched from the USS Hornet.

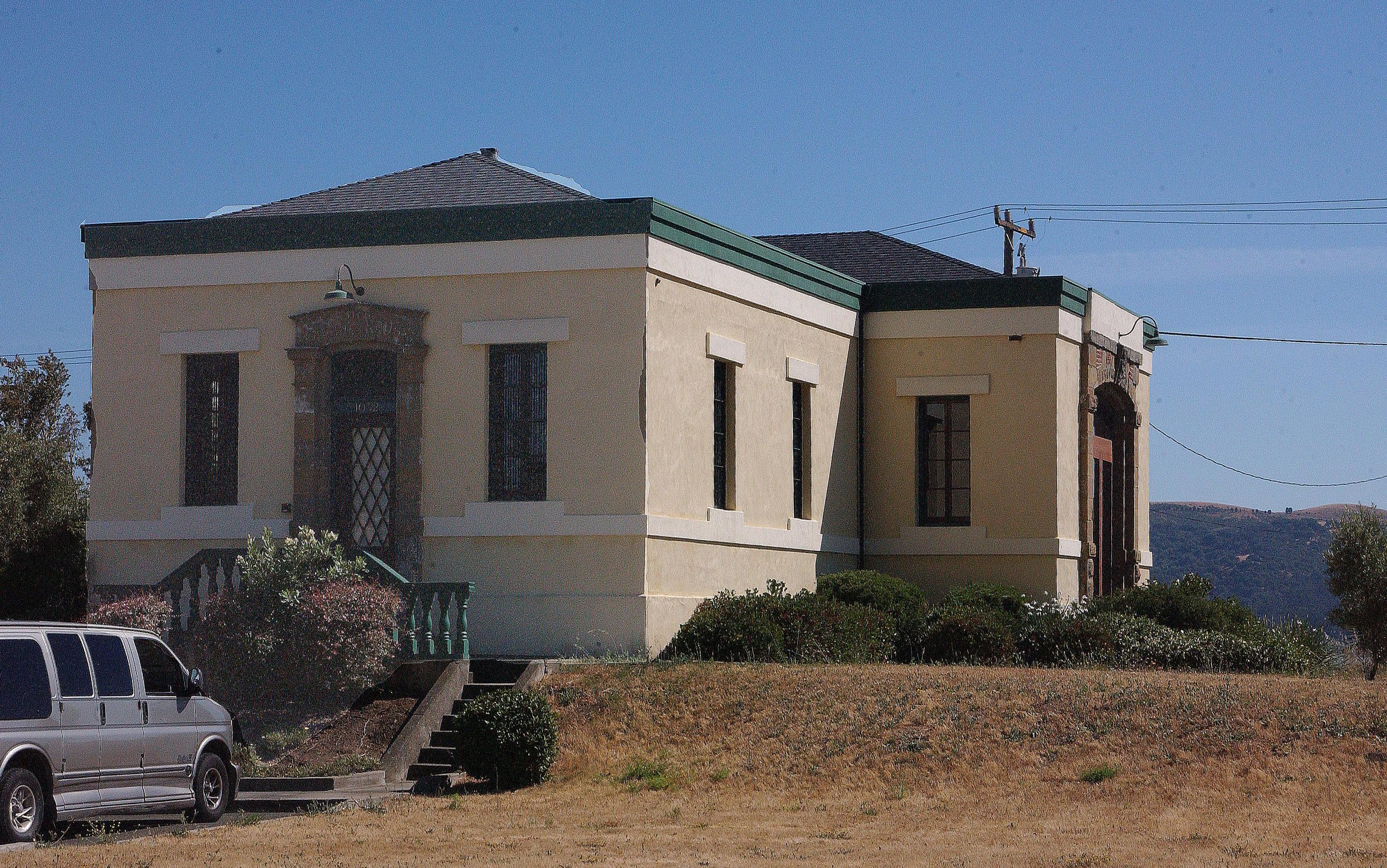
Guardhouse

Prior to 1940, the arsenal employed 85 civilian employees; by October 1942, the payroll had reached 4,545. The labor shortage in 1944 forced the arsenal commander to put 250 Italian and 400 German prisoners of war to work, alongside 150 juveniles from the California Youth Authority. Women comprised nearly half the civilian employee force. During the Korean War, the number of civilians reached an all-time high of 6,700 workers.

The Benicia Arsenal was deactivated in 1963, and the facility was closed in 1964. The arsenal has been redeveloped as work and sales space for artists and artisans.

Medal of Honor recipient John H. Foley is buried in the arsenal's cemetery.

== See also ==
- California Historical Landmarks in Solano County
- National Register of Historic Places listings in Solano County, California
- Gods and Generals by Michael Shaara.
- California during World War II
