= Bird and Dinkelspiel Store =

- U.S. National Register of Historic Places
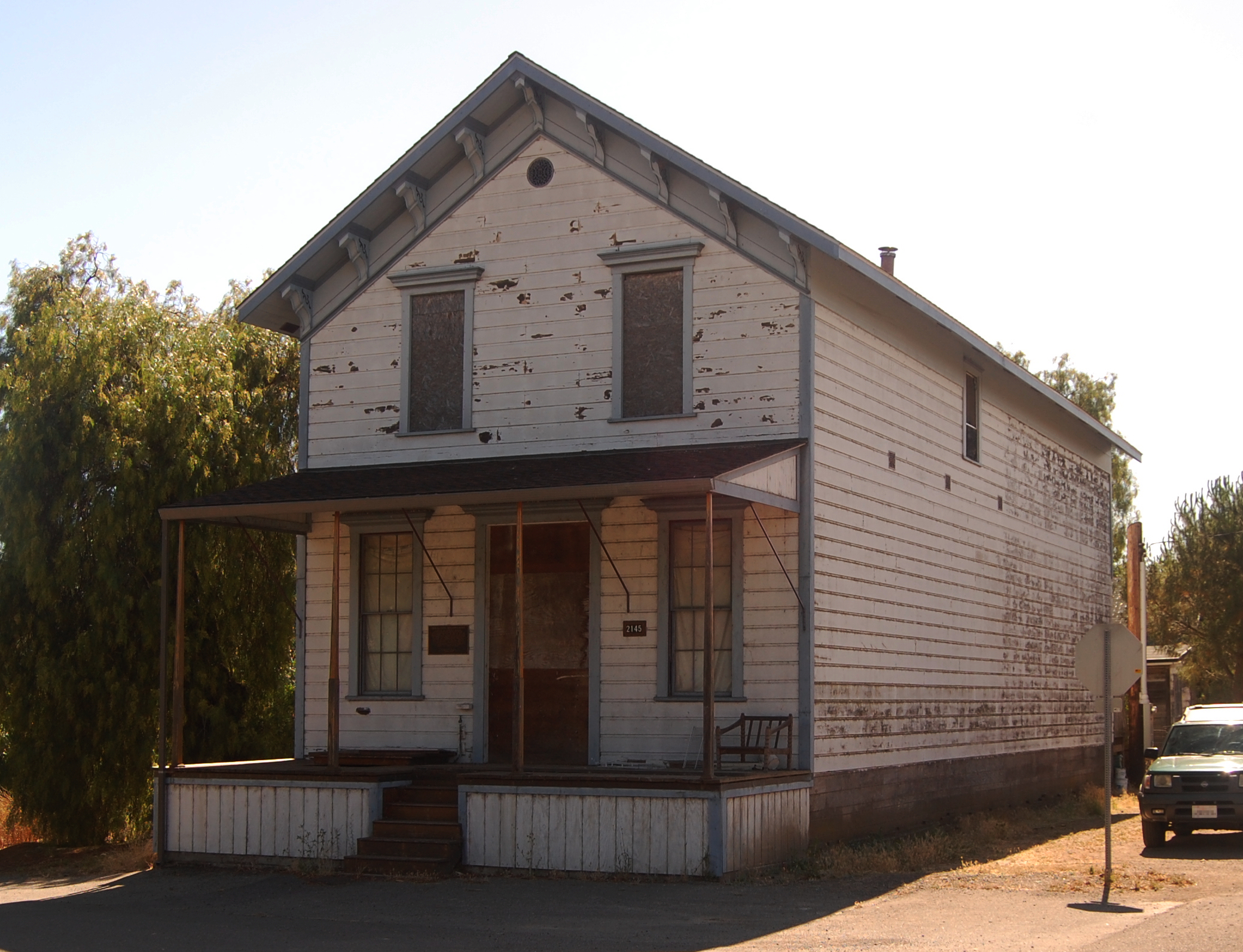
- Photo in 2011

- Location within California Location within the United States
- Location: 2145 Collinsville Rd., Birds Landing, California
- Coordinates: 38°7′58″N 121°52′12″W
- Area: less than one acre
- Built: 1875
- Architectural style: vernacular Greek Revival
- NRHP reference No.: 99001264
- Added to NRHP: October 21, 1999

The Bird and Dinkelspiel Store in Birds Landing, California was built in 1875. The building was listed on the National Register of Historic Places in 1999.

It is a two-story balloon-framed building at a cross-roads which was the starting point of the town of Birds Landing. It is 60 by 24 feet (18.3 m × 7.3 m) in plan and is vernacular Greek Revival in style.

It is a California listed resource.
