= Rockville Stone Chapel =

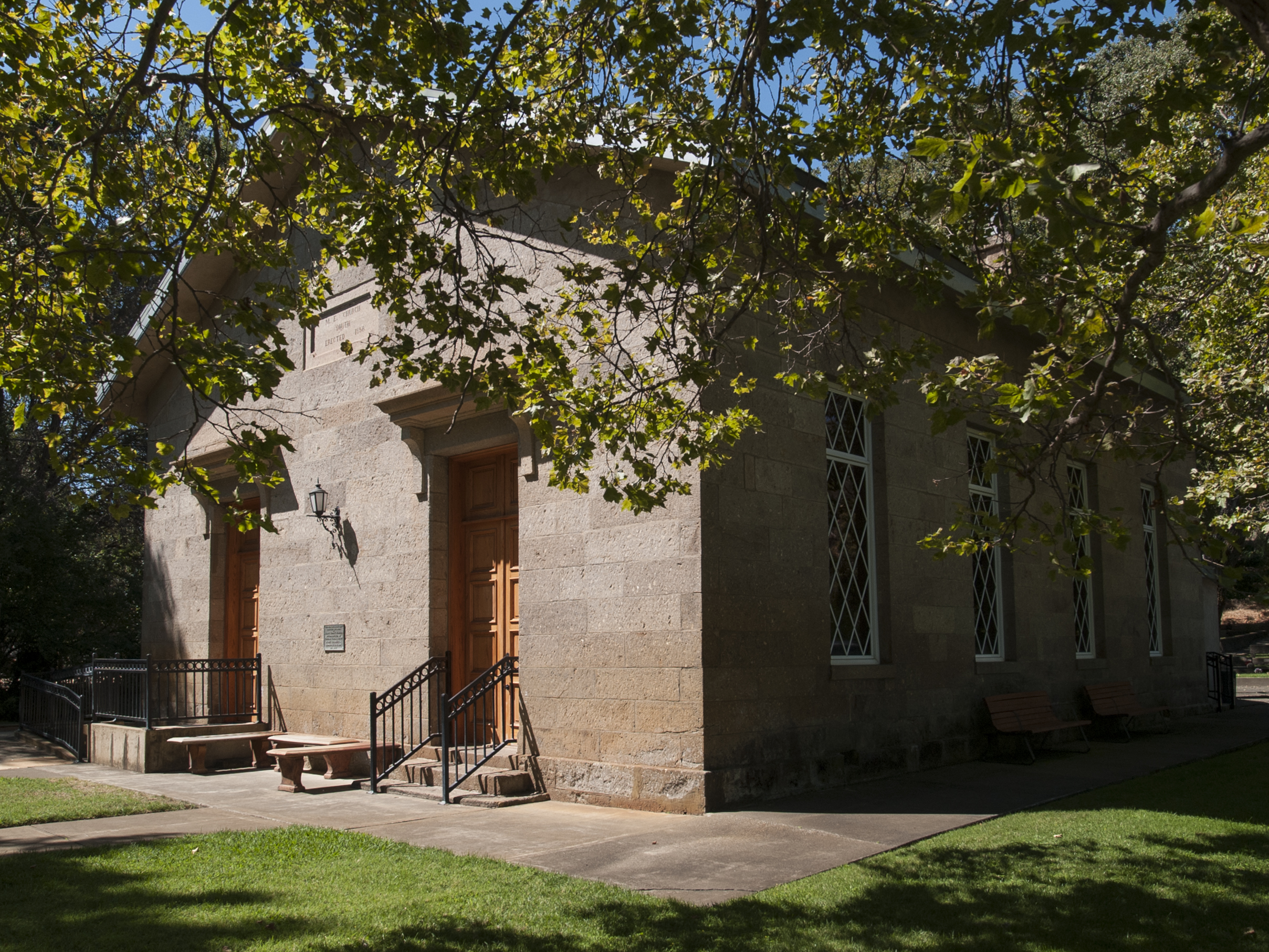
- The Rockville Stone Chapel in 2019

General information
- Location: Rockville Cemetery, Suisun Valley Rd, 0.2 mi N of Rockville, Rockville, Solano County, California
- Coordinates: 38°14′51″N 122°07′18″W

Design and construction
- Designations: Registered as California Historical Landmark #779, Nov. 20, 1962

An outgrowth of local camp meetings, Rockville Stone Chapel was constructed in the fall of 1856, in use by Christmas of that year, and dedicated in February 1857. Divisions in the congregation over slavery soon split the congregation, with the Northern faction splitting off at Christmas Eve 1863 to form their own church. Attendance at the chapel slowly declined, with the last resident pastor leaving in 1895. Although services continued sporadically, the building fell into disrepair and, in 1929, the chapel was donated to the County of Solano. With the onset of the Great Depression that year, restoration did not occur for another decade, with the WPA finally accomplishing a full renovation in the spring of 1940. Declared a State Historical Landmark in October 1962, the chapel continues in use today (2019), serving as the sanctuary for the local Church of Christ congregation and also hosting weddings and funerals.

== Origins ==
In the early 1850s, the Suisun Valley had become a popular local site for camp meetings, outdoor revival gatherings that lasted up to two weeks, by the Methodist Episcopal Church. Entire families camped out (hence "camp meeting") for the whole time, often bringing their cow for fresh milk.

At the meeting in 1855, building of a permanent structure was proposed by the county's presiding Elder, the Reverend Bailey, and $5,000 was raised. Land for the chapel and an adjoining cemetery was donated by local resident Landy Alford. He, with his wife their two daughters and a son-in-law, had come West in 1846. They were part of a large group of emigrants which also included the ill-fated Donner Party. Alford's son-in-law Nathan Barbour was one of those who helped rescue the remnants of the Donner Party the following spring. Alford and Barbour also served in the Bear Flag Revolt.

== Early history ==
Construction of the chapel took place in the fall of 1856. The stone, of volcanic ash and magnesium, was cut in the nearby hills. It has the interesting property of being soft and easy to cut but hardening soon after exposure to air. Most of the workers were volunteers, led by stonemasons Joel Price and George Whitely.

The cornerstone was laid on October 3, 1856, with the Reverend Sylvester Woodbridge of Benicia presiding. Construction went quickly enough to allow Christmas services to be held in the chapel, with formal dedication following in February 1857. The first pastor was the Reverend Bailey; on the Sunday following the dedication the Reverend Robert Waterman spoke.

== Decline and Decay ==
Soon after the chapel's founding, a fissure developed in the congregation, with the members splitting on the issue of slavery. At the Christmas Eve service of 1863, the Northern supporters left, and the remaining, Southern-aligned, parishioners placed a plaque on the chapel, still present today, reading: "M.D. Church South - 1858".

After the Civil War ended, the membership slowly declined, with the last resident minister, Reverend B. J. Waugh, departing in 1895. Services continued sporadically in the years following.

Over time the building deteriorated, with broken windows and a leaky roof. The leaks allowed rain to infiltrate the building and the floors rotted. One funeral, that of Charles Campbell, was held outside, as the participants were unable to trust that the chapel wouldn't collapse in aftershocks from the 1906 San Francisco Earthquake.

== Restoration ==
In 1929, the chapel was donated to the County of Solano as a pioneer memorial, with the provisos that it be maintained, that it not be used for secular purposes, and that the plaque place on it in 1863 be preserved. Violation of any one of these provisos would result in reversion of the property to the ME Church.

The intervention of the Great Depression meant that no work was done on preservation/renovation until 1940, when action by local residents, such as Rose Lee Baldwin, Dave Weir, and Mr. L. M. Robbins led to Congressman Frank S. Buck convincing the WPA to undertake the project.

Using labor from the State Relief Camp in Benicia, a new roof was installed, the original low ceiling was eliminated, walls replastered, stained glass windows replaced, and a new floor was installed. The 22 original pews were restored at the Hale Fruit Shed.

The chapel was rededicated on Decoration Day (Memorial Day), 1940, by the last surviving minister who had preached, the Reverend C. C. Black. In 1962, the Solano Historical Society sought state landmark status, with the chapel being listed in October of that year as SHL #779.

== Today ==
The chapel continues to be actively used. As of 2019, it serves as the sanctuary for the local congregation of the Church of Christ, and also hosts weddings and funerals.

Ca. 2007, a further renovation was carried out by the Suisun Fairfield Rockville Cemetery District, which now owns the chapel. The windows were replaced, the floor sanded and refinished, and the pews—well the old pews were a reflection of the smaller stature of the people of 150 years ago and were replaced with slightly larger replicas.

There are two commemorative plaques posted outside. One is the SHL official plaque, reading:

Erected by pioneers of Methodist Episcopal Church South with volunteer labor and donated funds. Cornerstone laid October 3, 1856. Dedicated February 1857. Site supplied by Landy and Sarah Alford. Chapel deteriorated by 1929 and deeded by the church to Rockville Public Cemetery District as a pioneer monument. Restored in 1940.

The other was placed by the WPA after the restoration:

This Historic Monument Erected A.D. 1856 by Solano County Pioneers. Reconstructed by Federal Works Agency, Work Projects Administration A.D. 1940

The chapel has been described, by a Mrs. Walter Scarlett, as follows: "A tiny rock-walled church among great brooding trees that spread green arms around it and raise still heads above it as though in wordless prayer.”

== See also ==
- California Historical Landmarks in Solano County
