= Vacaville Town Hall =

- Vacaville Town Hall or Old Town Hall
- U.S. National Register of Historic Places
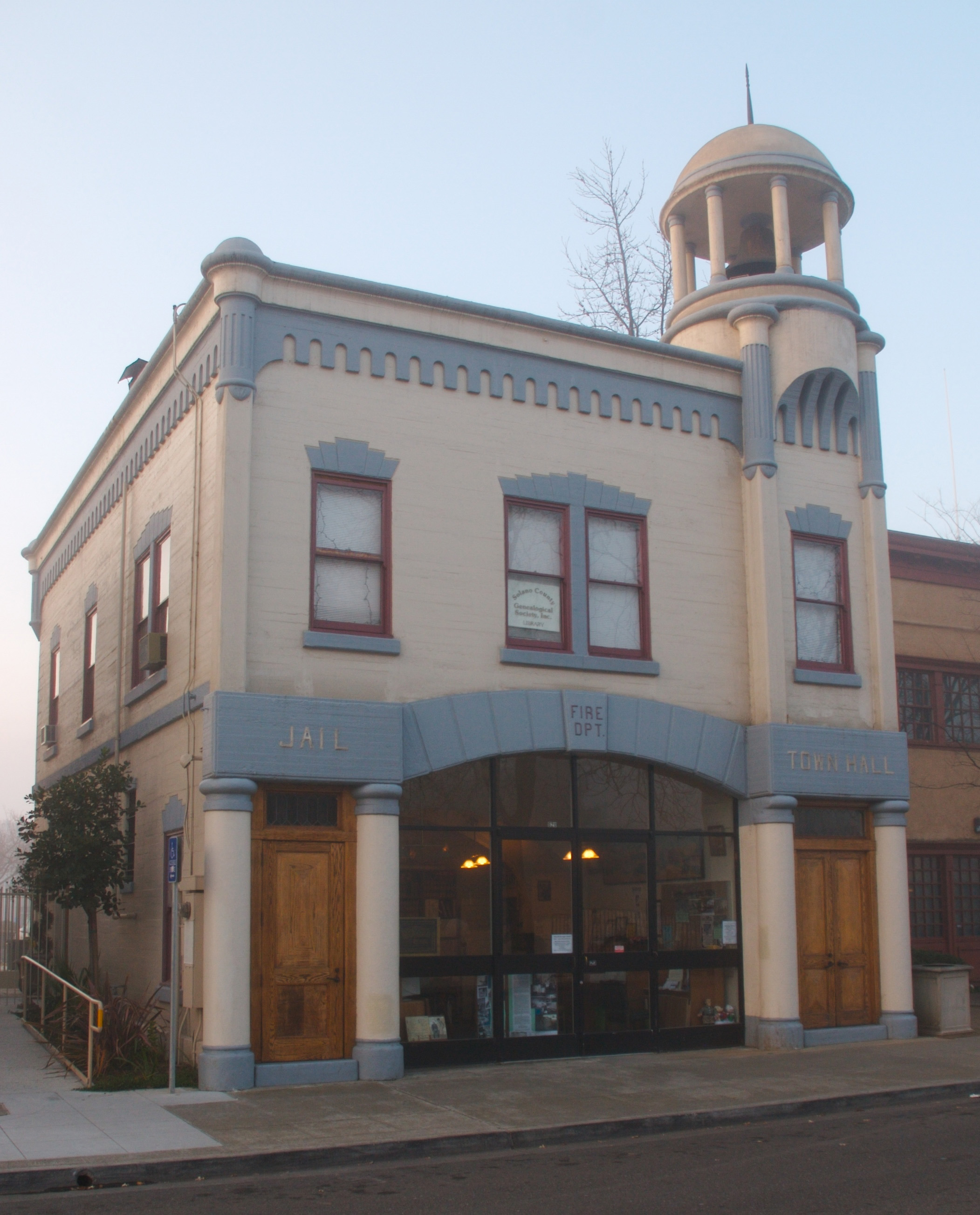

- Location within California Location within the United States
- Location: 620 E. Main St., Vacaville, California
- Coordinates: 38°21′23″N 121°59′5″W
- Area: 0.1 acres (0.040 ha)
- Built: 1907
- Architects: Steiger, F.A.
- NRHP reference No.: 78000799
- Added to NRHP: September 18, 1978

Vacaville Town Hall also known as Old Town Hall is a historic building in Vacaville, California, United States. It was designed by F.A. Steiger and built in 1907. It was listed on the National Register of Historic Places in 1978. The listing included one other historically contributing building.

It is a two-story 32 by 44 feet (9.8 m × 13.4 m) building.
