= Suisun Masonic Lodge No. 55 =

- Stanley Y. Beverley Lodge #108
- U.S. National Register of Historic Places
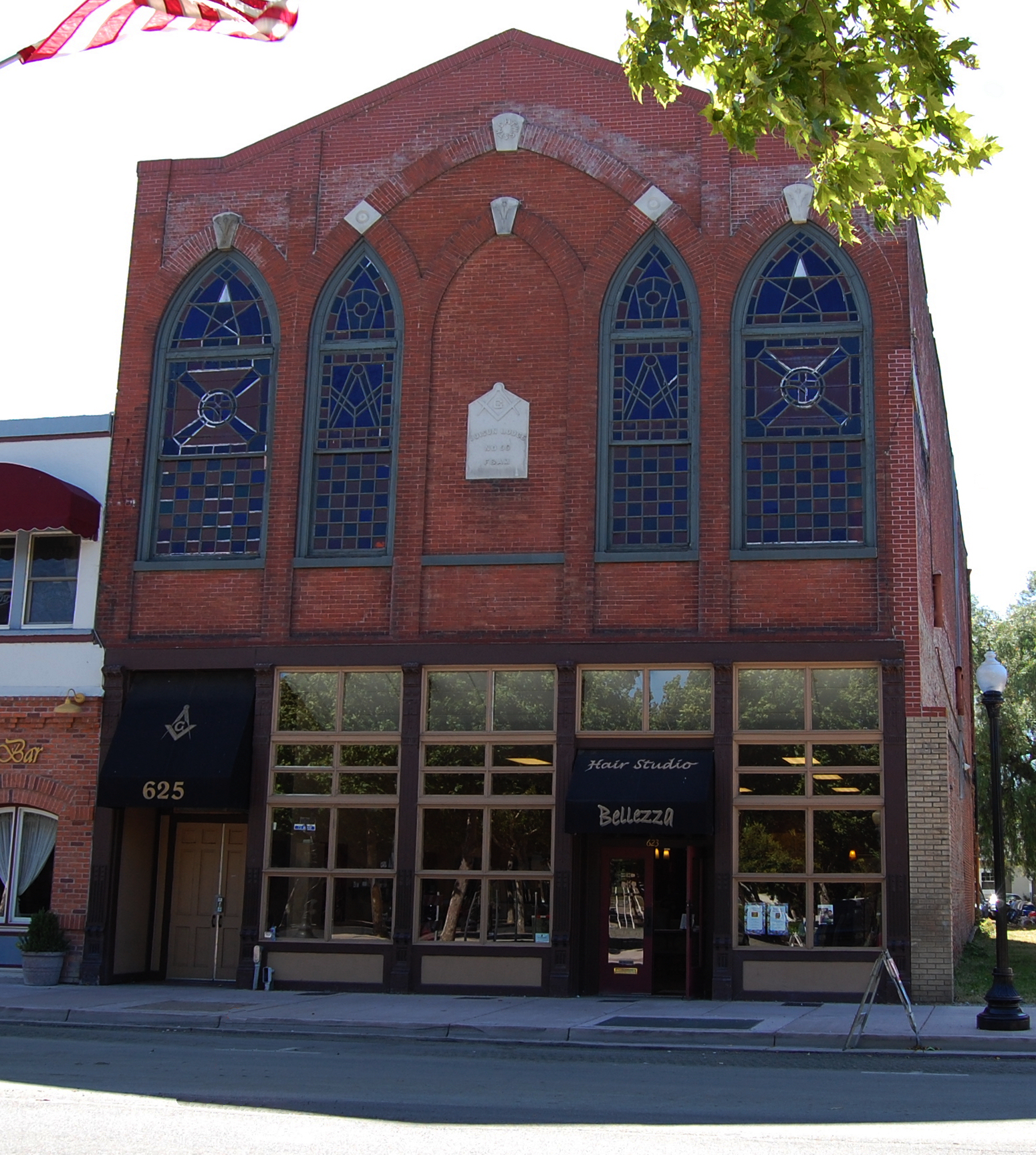

- Location within California Location within the United States
- Location: 623 Main St., Suisun City, California
- Coordinates: 38°14′17″N 122°2′22″W
- Area: less than one acre
- Built: 1855
- Architects: Rush, Hiram
- NRHP reference No.: 78000798
- Added to NRHP: December 18, 1978

The Stanley Y. Beverley Lodge #108' building (also known as Stanley Y. Beverley Lodge), is a historic building located in Suisun City, California, built in 1855. It was designed by Hiram Rush. The building served as a Prince Hall Masonic Lodge and as a business. It was listed on the National Register of Historic Places in 1978 as "Suisun Masonic Lodge No. 55". The building has also been known locally as the Stanley Beverly Lodge building.

The building was named after the Freemasons lodge that originally occupied the upper floor of the building. The lower floor was rented as retail space. The first commercial tenant of the two-storey brick building was the Moses Dinkelspiel & Co. dry goods store. Over the years, a variety of businesses have come and gone from the commercial space - it has housed a pool hall, an auto parts store, and a hair salon.

Suisun Lodge no longer meets in the 623 Main St. building, having sold it in 1965 to Stanley Beverly Lodge No. 108 (a Prince Hall Affiliate Lodge).
