= Old Masonic Hall (Benicia, California) =

- U.S. National Register of Historic Places
- California Historical Landmark
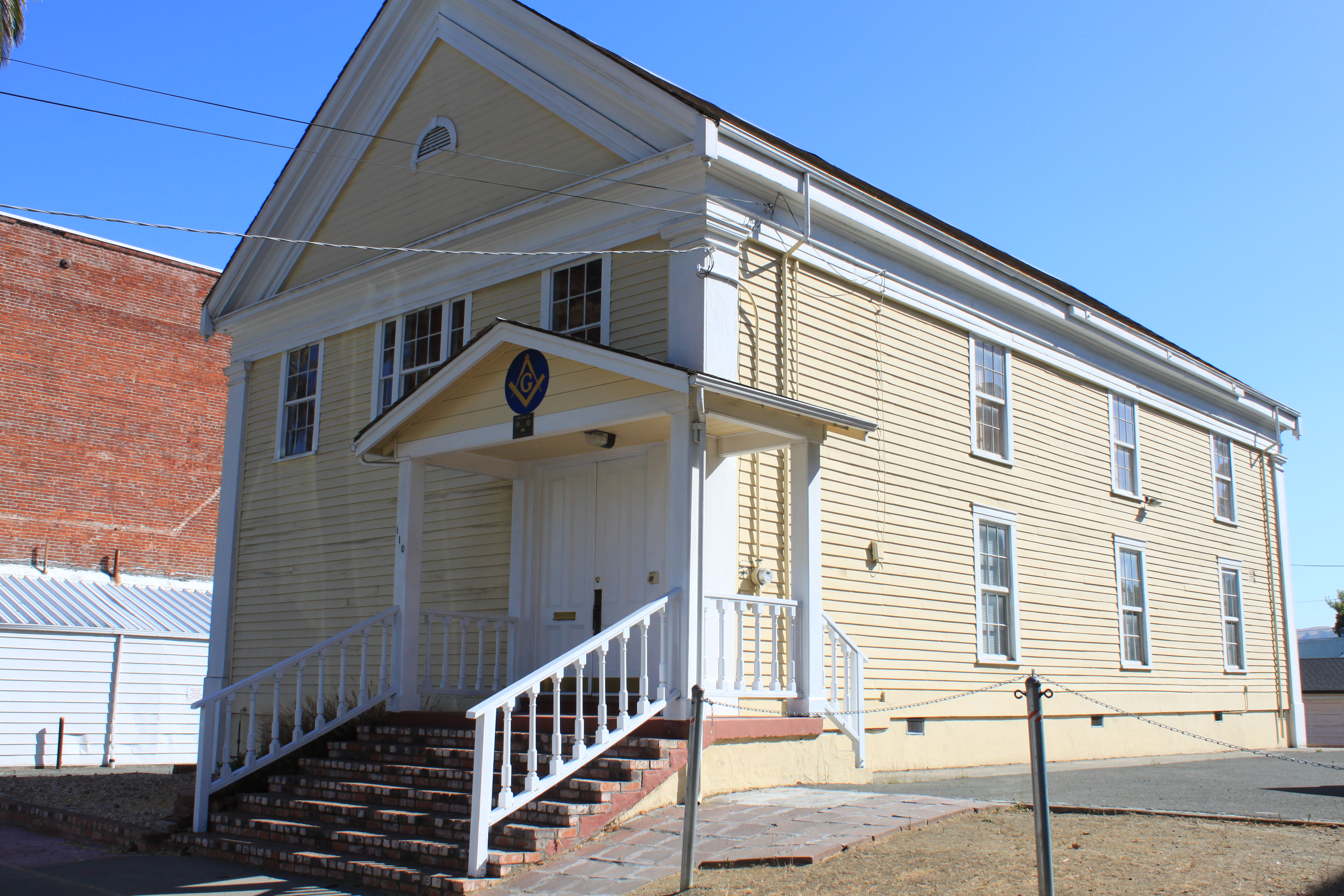

- Location within California Location within the United States
- Location: 110 W. J St., Benicia, California
- Coordinates: 38°3′9″N 122°9′24″W
- Area: 2 acres (0.81 ha)
- Built: 1850
- NRHP reference No.: 72000259
- CHISL No.: 174

Significant dates
- Added to NRHP: March 16, 1972
- Designated CHISL: March 6, 1935

The Old Masonic Hall, also known as Benicia Masonic Hall, is a historic building in Benicia, California. Constructed by Benicia Masonic Lodge No. 5 in summer 1850, on land donated by Alexander Riddell and with lumber donated by Benicia founder Robert Semple, it was the first purpose build Masonic Hall in California. It was occupied by the lodge October 14, 1850, and formally dedicated December 27, 1850.

In 1850 Benicia was the original County seat of Solano County, and the first floor of the Hall was used as the Solano County court room and offices prior to the completion of Benicia's city hall. The second-floor rooms, with remarkable ornate woodwork made by California frontier craftsmen, was used for the Lodge.

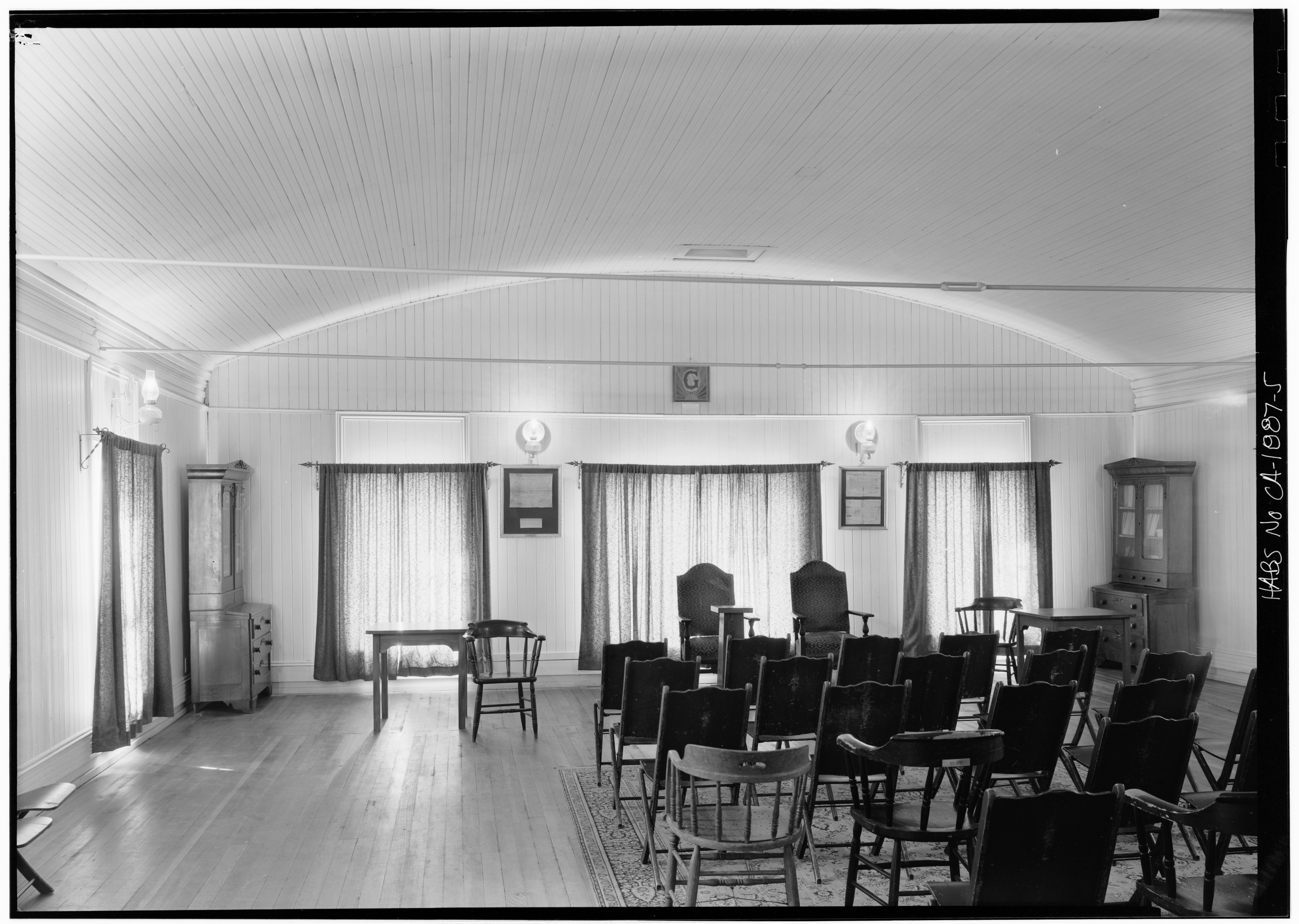
Second floor Assembly Room, Masonic Hall, 1933

The Benicia Lodge No. 5, founded on March 6, 1850, included many of the important Benicia pioneers, among them Robert Semple, W. B. Nurse, L. B, Mizner, and Alexander Riddell. The building served as the Masonic Temple for Benicia Lodge No. 5 until 1888, when the Lodge outgrew the premises and constructed a larger one adjacent to it. The building was then sold to be used for community purposes; it housed a boys' club prior to World War I and the American Legion shortly after the war. In 1950, one hundred years after it was erected, it was reacquired by Benicia Lodge No. 5. The building was listed on the California Historical Landmarks in 1935 and the National Register of Historic Places in 1972.

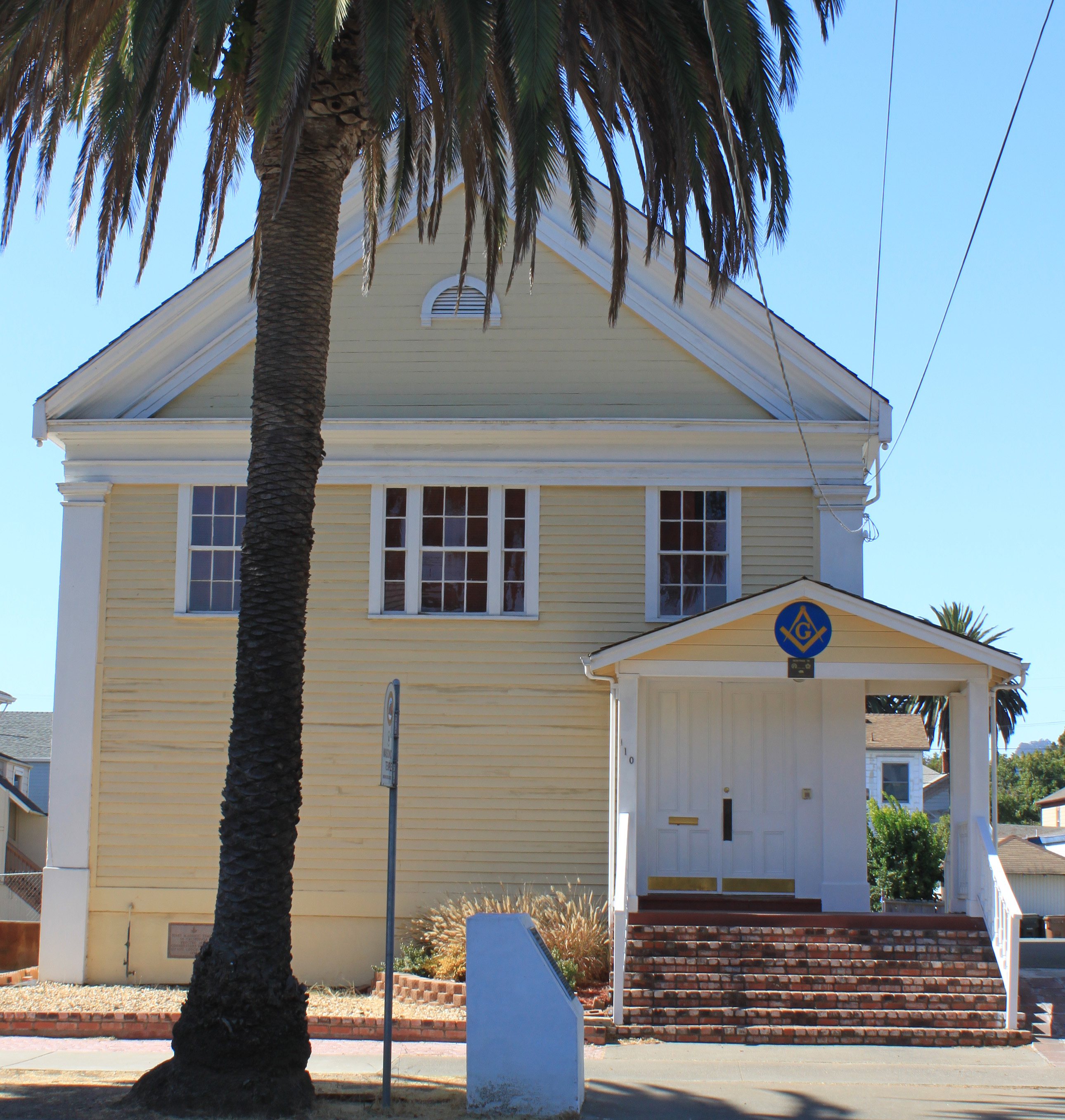
Benicia Masonic Hall, Front

One of the earliest surviving public buildings in Benicia, the Old Masonic Hall is an excellent example of 19th-century Greek Revival architecture. The moderately pitched front gable roof has a molded fascia and a plain verge board. A cornice is found on both the gable end and the eaves. The fenestration is symmetrically arranged. The gable entry porch covering extends beyond the building on the west side. Cladding is lap siding with wooden pilasters with capitals at the corners of the building.

The building is still in use.

== See also ==
- California Historical Landmarks in Solano County
