= Fischer-Hanlon House =

Historical place in Solano County, United States

- U.S. National Register of Historic Places
- California Historical Landmark
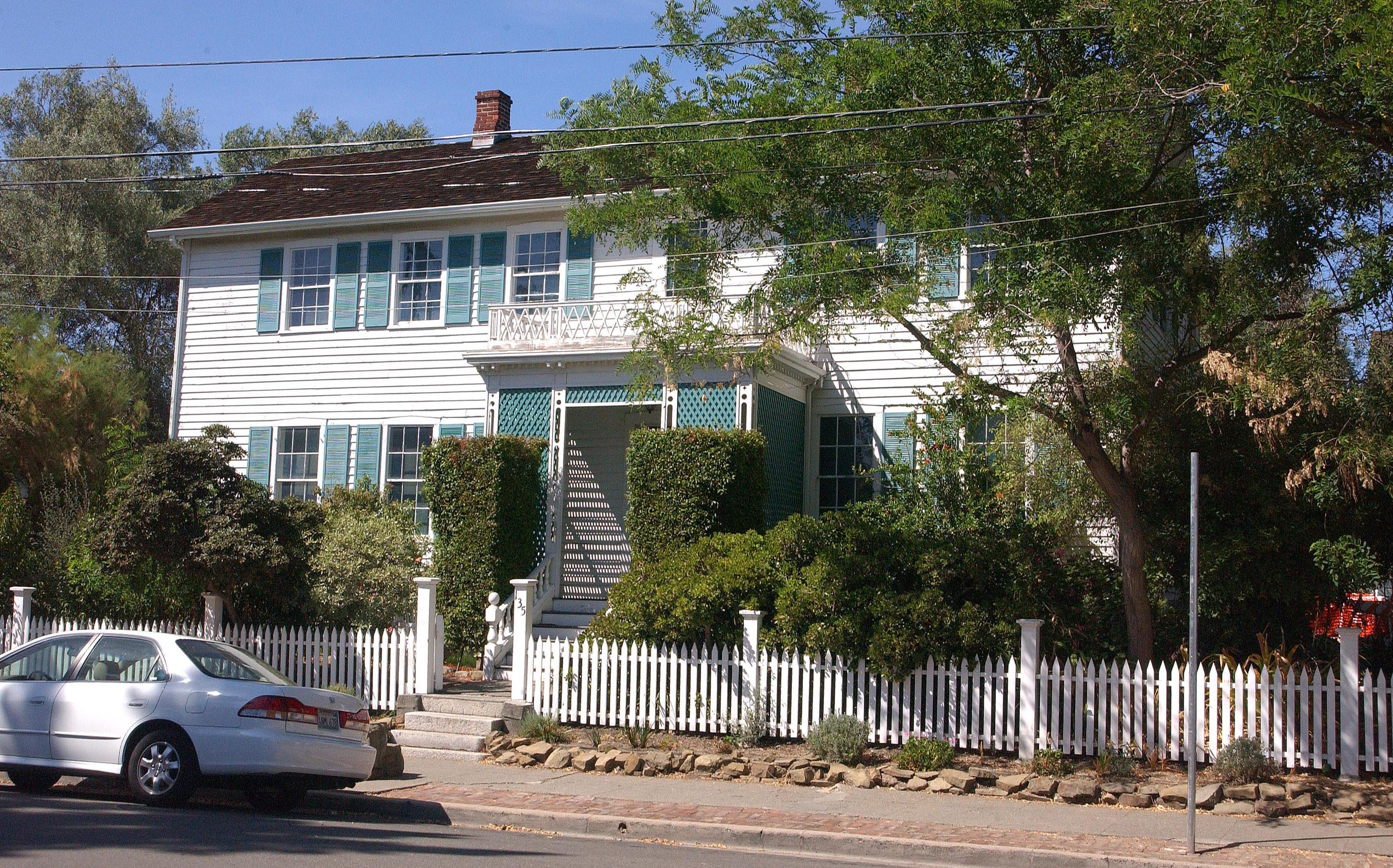
- Fischer-Hanlon House

- Location within California Location within the United States
- Location: Benicia Capitol State Historic Park; 135 G Street, Benicia, California
- Coordinates: 38.0501°N 122.159°W
- Built: 1858
- Architectural style: East Coast Federalist
- NRHP reference No.: 79000556
- CHISL No.: 880

Significant dates
- Added to NRHP: 1979
- Designated CHISL: March 14, 1975

Fischer-Hanlon House is historical house built in 1858 in Benicia, California in Solano County, California. The Fischer-Hanlon House is California Historical Landmark No. 880, listed on March 14, 1975. The Fischer-Hanlon House was built by Joseph Fisher in 1849. Fisher, a butcher, was a Swiss immigrant who came to Benicia and purchased a plot of land on July 1, 1858. He then purchased a nearby old hotel and had it moved to his lot. The California Gold Rush home is built in an East Coast Federalist architectural style. The wooden house has fourteen rooms. It was damaged in a fire in 1856. After Joseph and Catherine Fischer moved in they repaired and remodeled the home. The Fischer house was passed down to later generations, then was donated to the State of California in 1969 by Fischer's granddaughters, Raphaelita and Catherine Hanlon, in memory of their sister Marie Rose. The Fischer-Hanlon House is restored and is furnished in 1880s decor. The outside is a Victorian Garden.

A historical marker is next to the Fischer-Hanlon House, at 135 W G Street, Benicia, next to the Benicia Capitol Building. The marker was placed there by California State Parks working with the Solano County Historical Society on September 9, 1976.

== See also ==
- California Historical Landmarks in Solano County
