= Benicia Capitol State Historic Park =

State historic park of California

- U.S. National Register of Historic Places
- California Historical Landmark
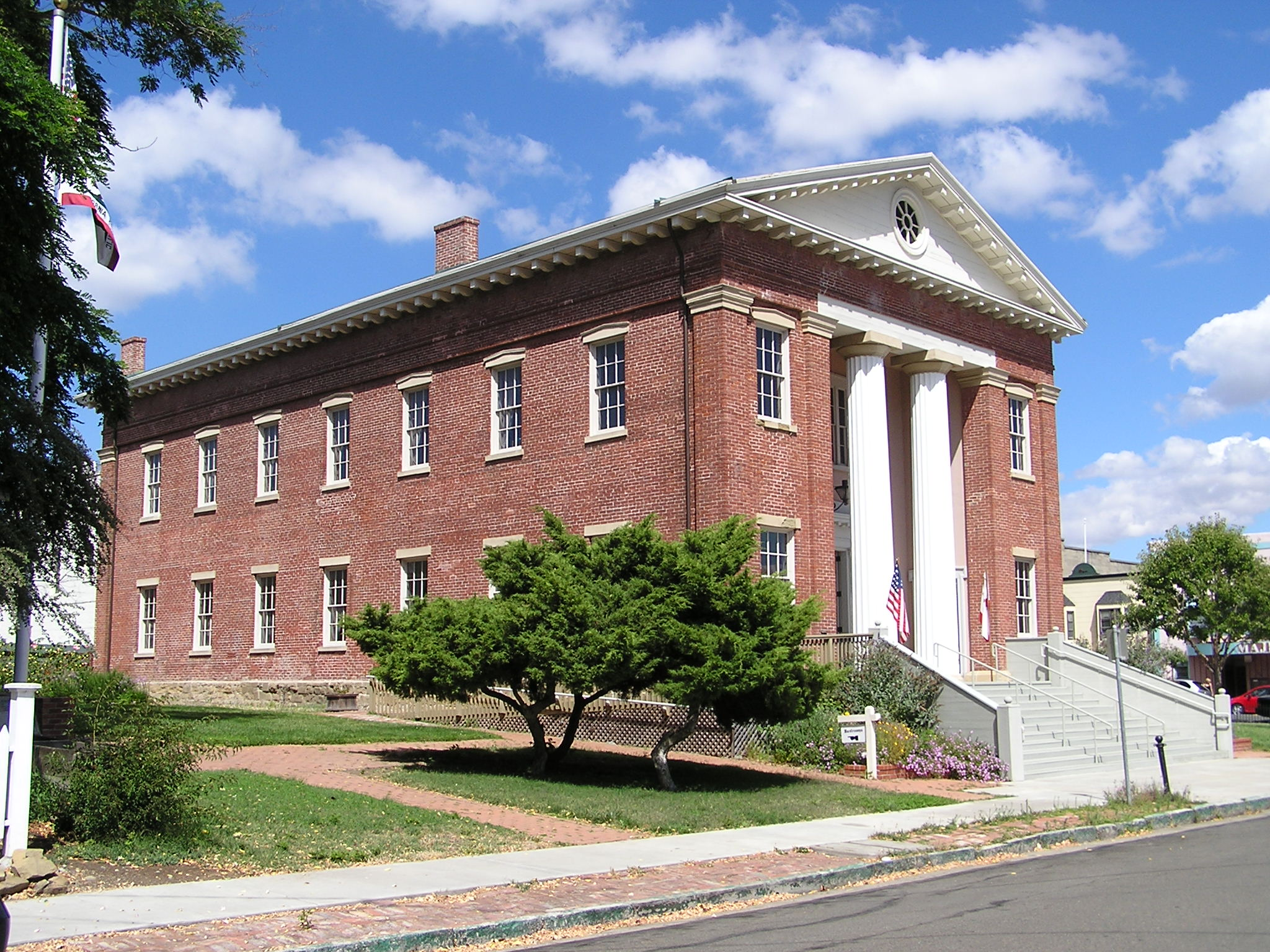
- California State Capitol, 1853–1854

- Location within California Location within the United States
- Location: 1st and G Sts., Benicia, California
- Coordinates: 38°3′1″N 122°9′28″W
- Area: 0.5 acres (0.20 ha)
- Built: 1852
- Architectural style: Greek Revival-Palladian
- NRHP reference No.: 71000204
- CHISL No.: 153

Significant dates
- Added to NRHP: February 12, 1971
- Designated CHISL: January 11, 1935

Benicia Capitol State Historic Park is a state park in Benicia, California, United States. The park is dedicated to California's third capitol building, where the California State Legislature convened from February 3, 1853, to February 24, 1854, when they voted to move the state capital to Sacramento. It is the only pre-Sacramento capitol that remains. The park includes the Fischer-Hanlon House, an early Benicia building that was moved to the property and converted into a home in 1858, after the legislature departed. Benicia Capitol State Historic Park just off the city's main street also includes a carriage house, workers' quarters and sculptured gardens.

== History ==
Following large complaints by state legislators of inadequate furniture and sleeping quarters in Vallejo, California in early 1853, the Legislature, with the consent of Governor John Bigler, relocated the state capital to nearby Benicia that same year. The Legislature convened in the Benicia City Hall for a little more than a year, when again complaints over poor weather conditions, inadequate and uncomfortable sleeping quarters, and "the insecure condition of the public archives" arose in January 1854.

After a proposal by Sacramento to use the Sacramento County Courthouse free of charge as a capitol building, the Assembly and Senate passed an enabling act, voiding all previous legislation, to move the state capital to its new location upriver in Sacramento. On February 25, 1854, Governor Bigler signed the act into law, moving the capital to its current location. The Legislature and governor climbed aboard the steamship Wilson G. Hunt to take up its new quarters. "So much opposed to the removal were the good people of Benicia," the Sacramento Union reported, "that the owners of the wharves, it is stated, refused to permit the steamer ... to land to take on the legislative furniture, unless she would pay $500." This request was refused and the furniture was shipped from a different wharf.

The Greek Revival-Palladian building was listed as a California State Historic Landmark on January 11, 1935. The National Register of Historic Places placed the Benicia capitol on the federal list on February 12, 1971.

== Present day ==
The original building has been restored with reconstructed period furnishings and exhibits. The interior includes a reconstruction of the building's original floor with ponderosa pine. The desks, four of which are from the 1850s or earlier, are furnished with a candlestick, a 19th-century newspaper, a quill pen, blotting sand, a spitoon, and a top hat.

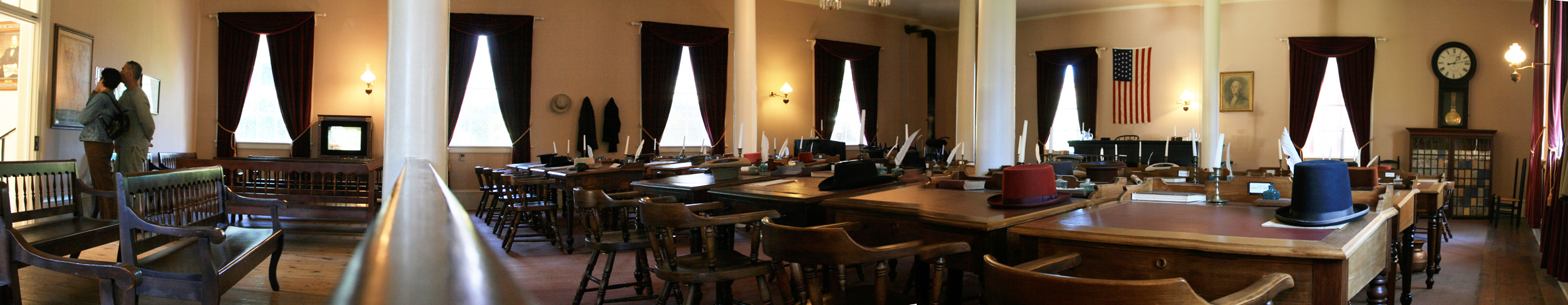
Senate chambers at Benicia. Period hats represent the senators of the time

The historic park is located at 115 West G Street in Benicia, a city in the northern San Francisco Bay Area between San Pablo Bay and Suisun Bay.

On February 16, 2000, the California State Legislature met in the old Capitol in a symbolic session to celebrate the 150th anniversary of the Legislature's first meeting.

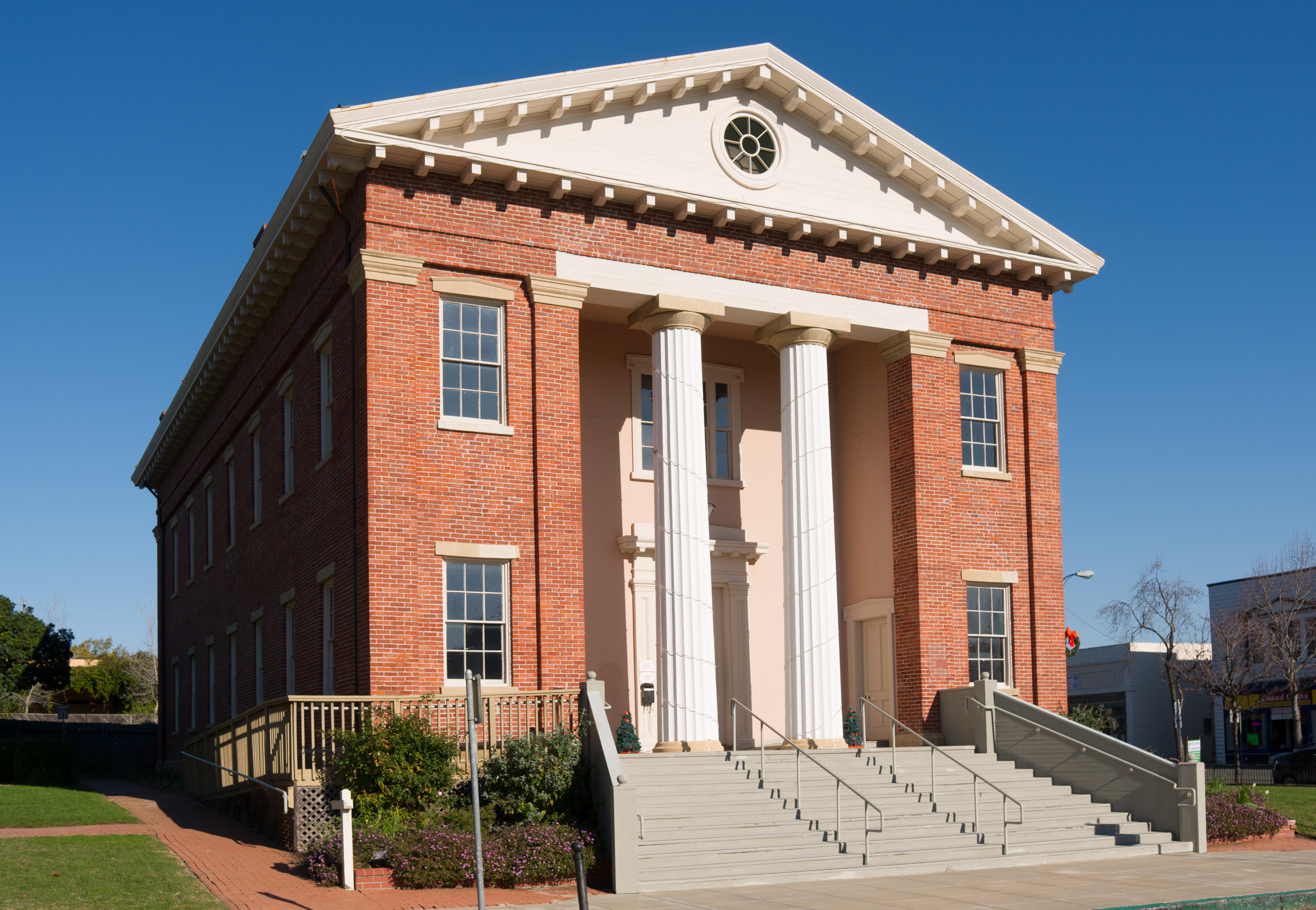
Senate chambers on first floor, Assembly chambers above.

== Proposed for closure ==
The Benicia Capitol State Historic Park was one of the 48 California state parks proposed for closure in January 2008 by California's Governor Arnold Schwarzenegger as part of a deficit reduction program, since rescinded following public outcry. It also was placed on the Governor's list of two hundred parks to close in fall of 2009 in response to the ongoing budget crisis and was on Jerry Brown's 2011 list of 70 proposed state park closures in the continuing budget crises.

In March 2013, then-Director of California Department of Parks and Recreation, Anthony L. Jackson, announced that no state parks would close during his tenure and that he had "done away with park closures."

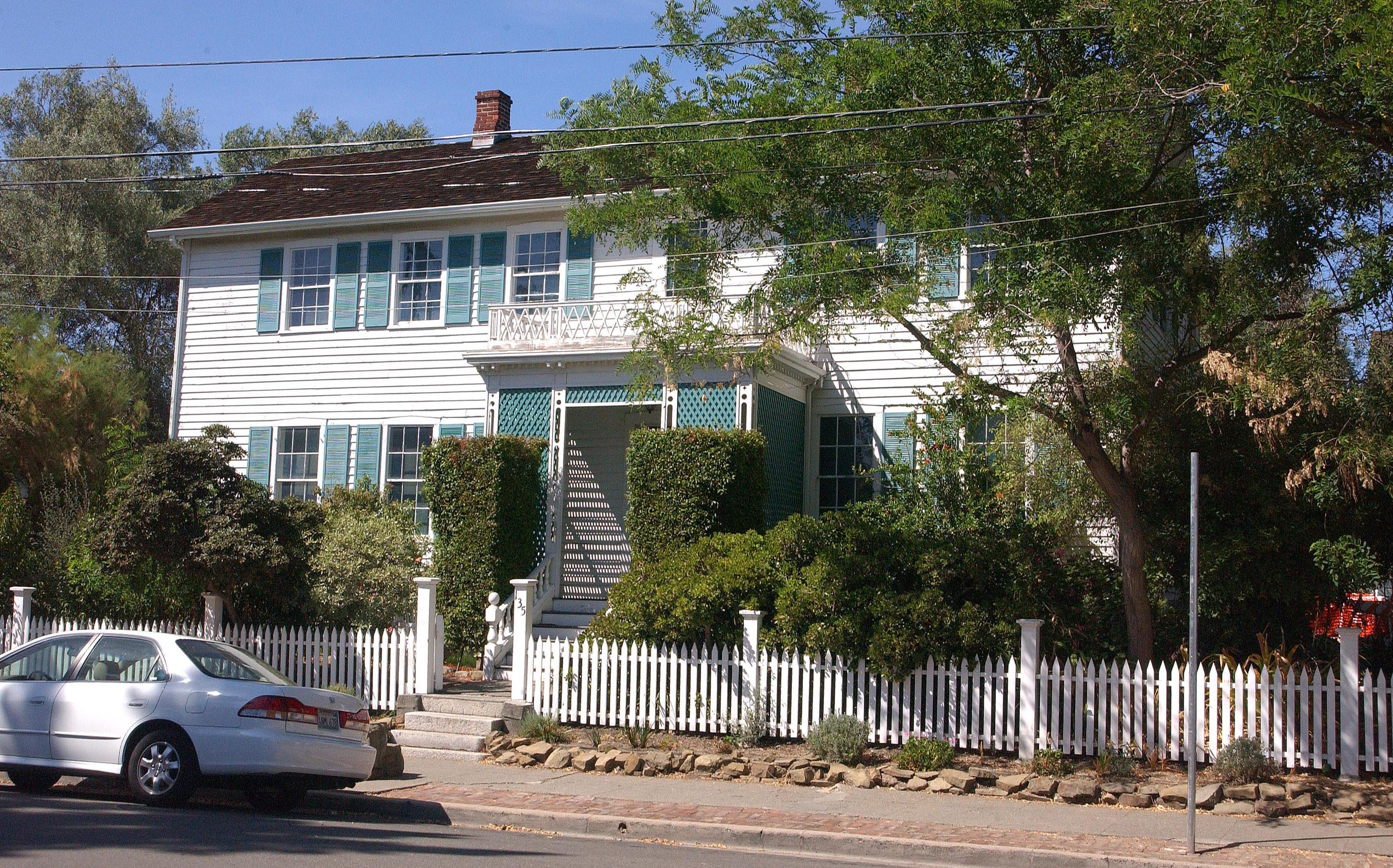
Fischer-Hanlon House

== Gallery ==
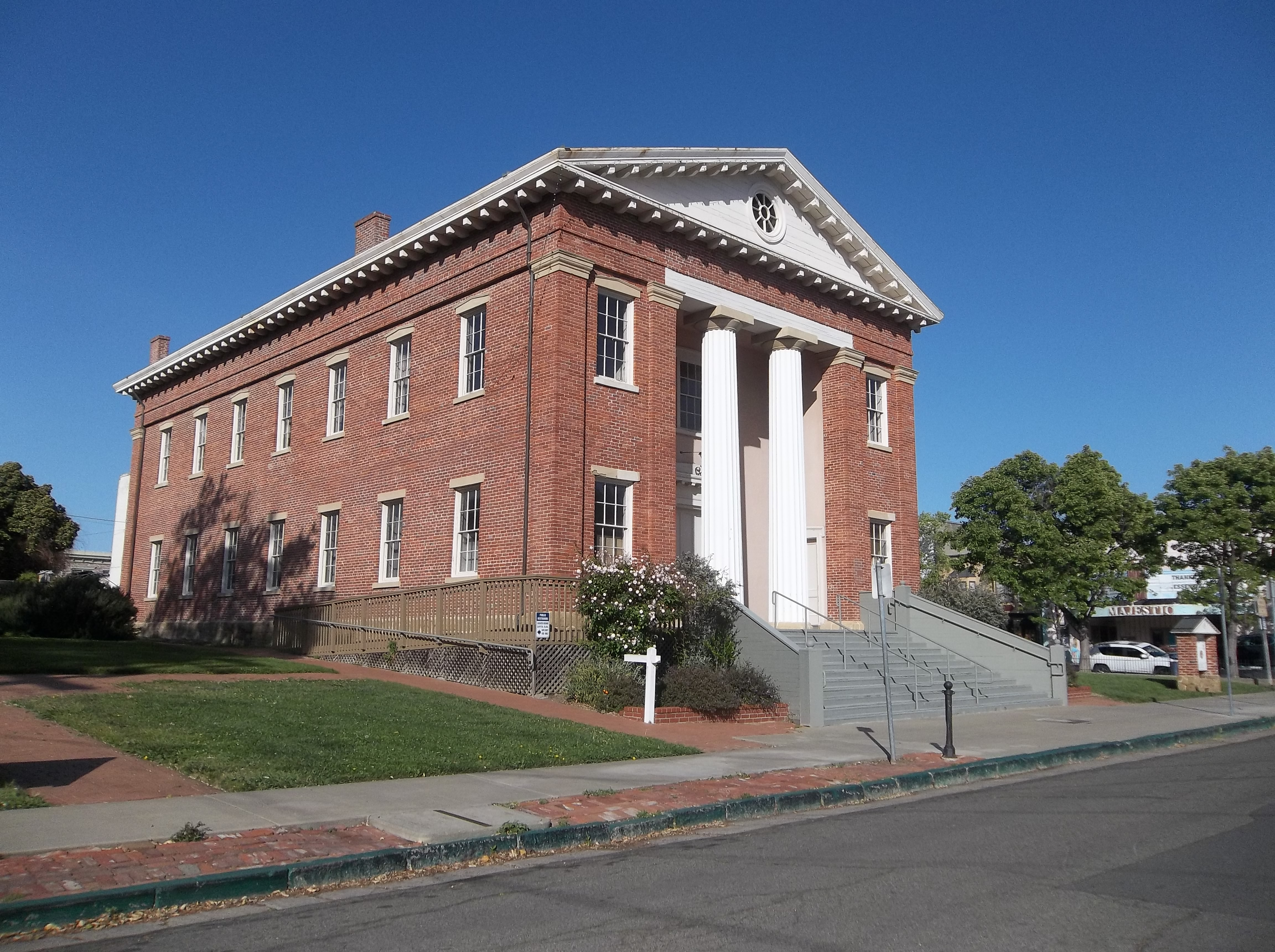
From the southwest

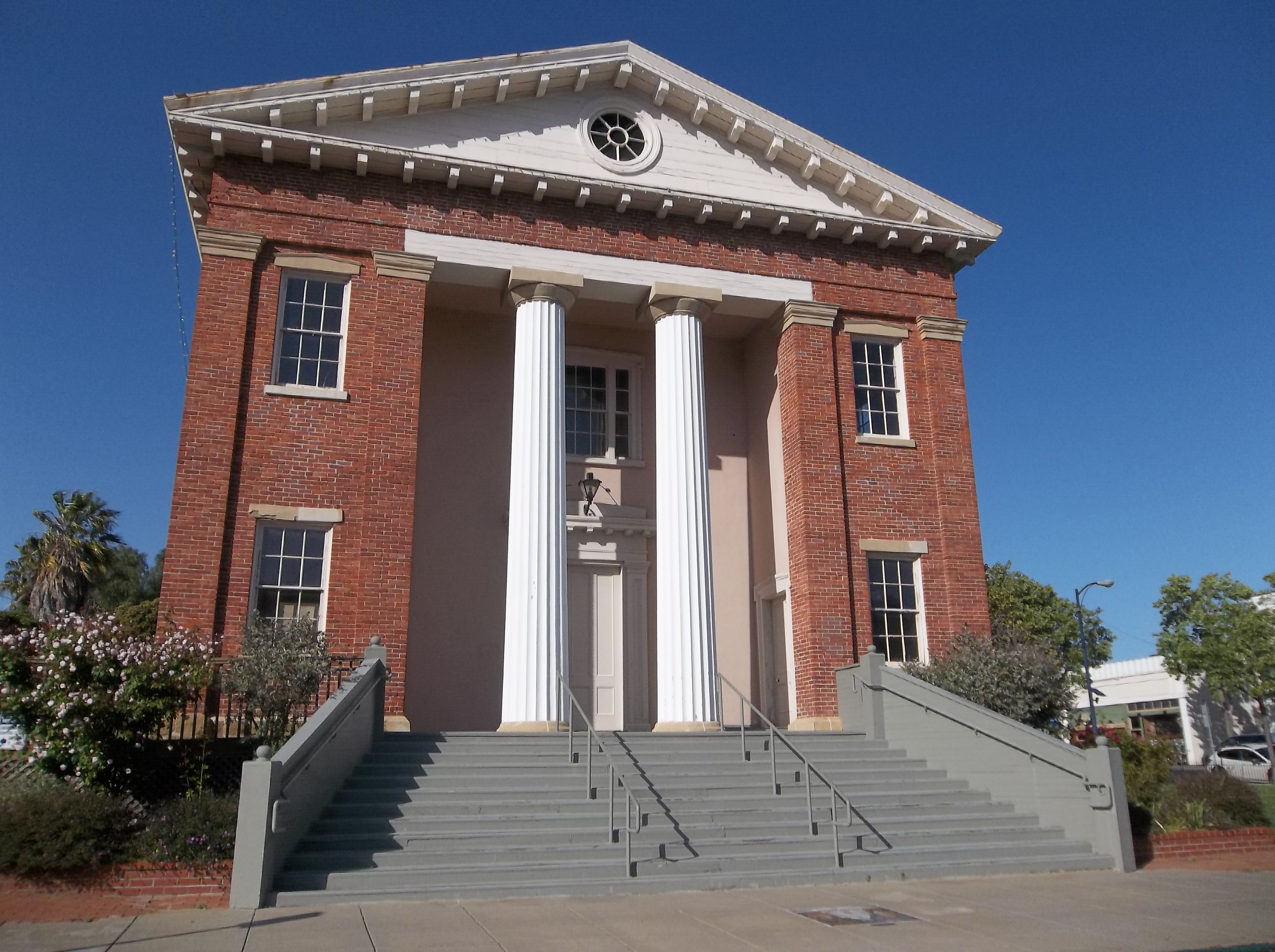
Front portico

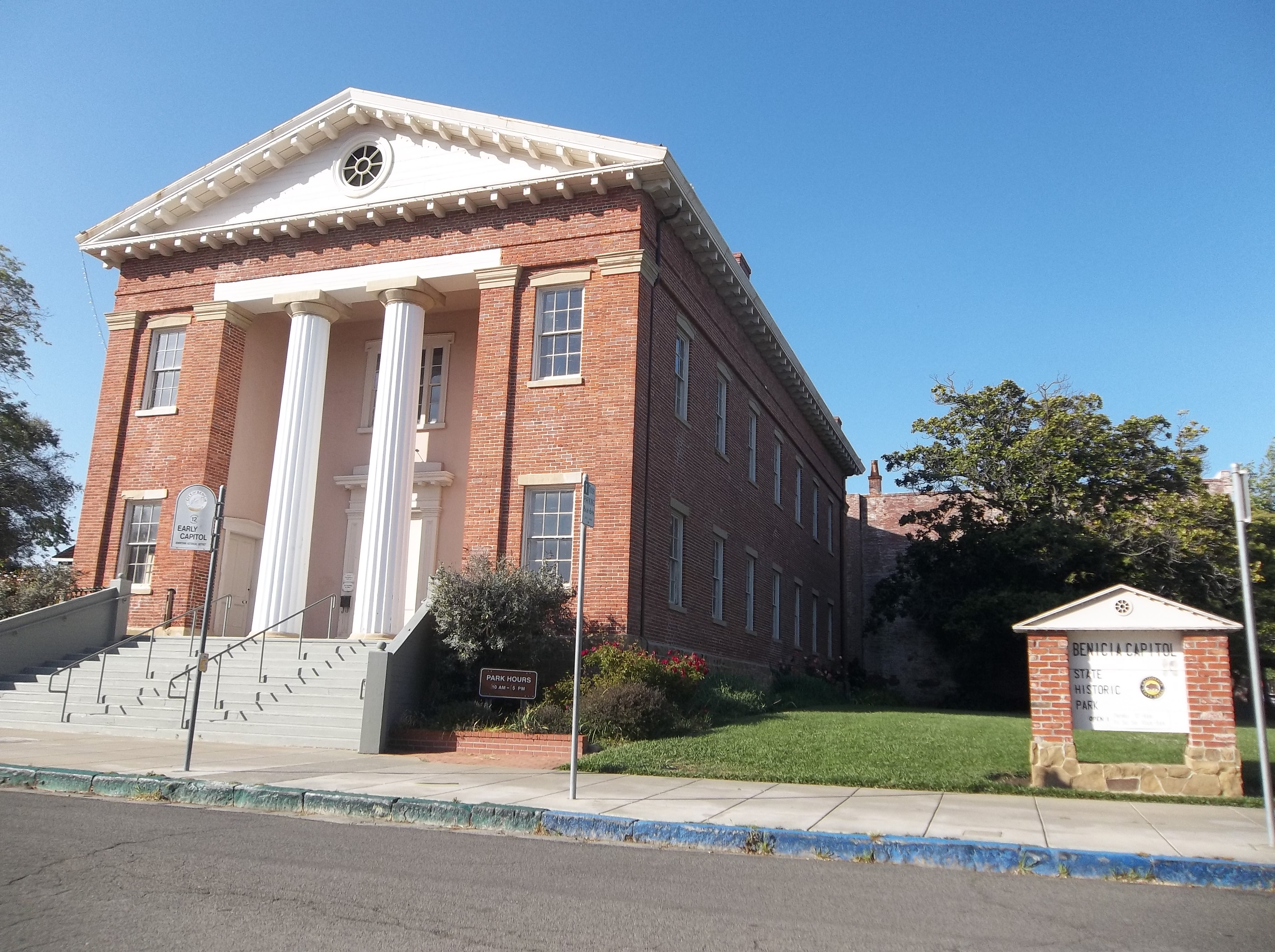
From the southeast

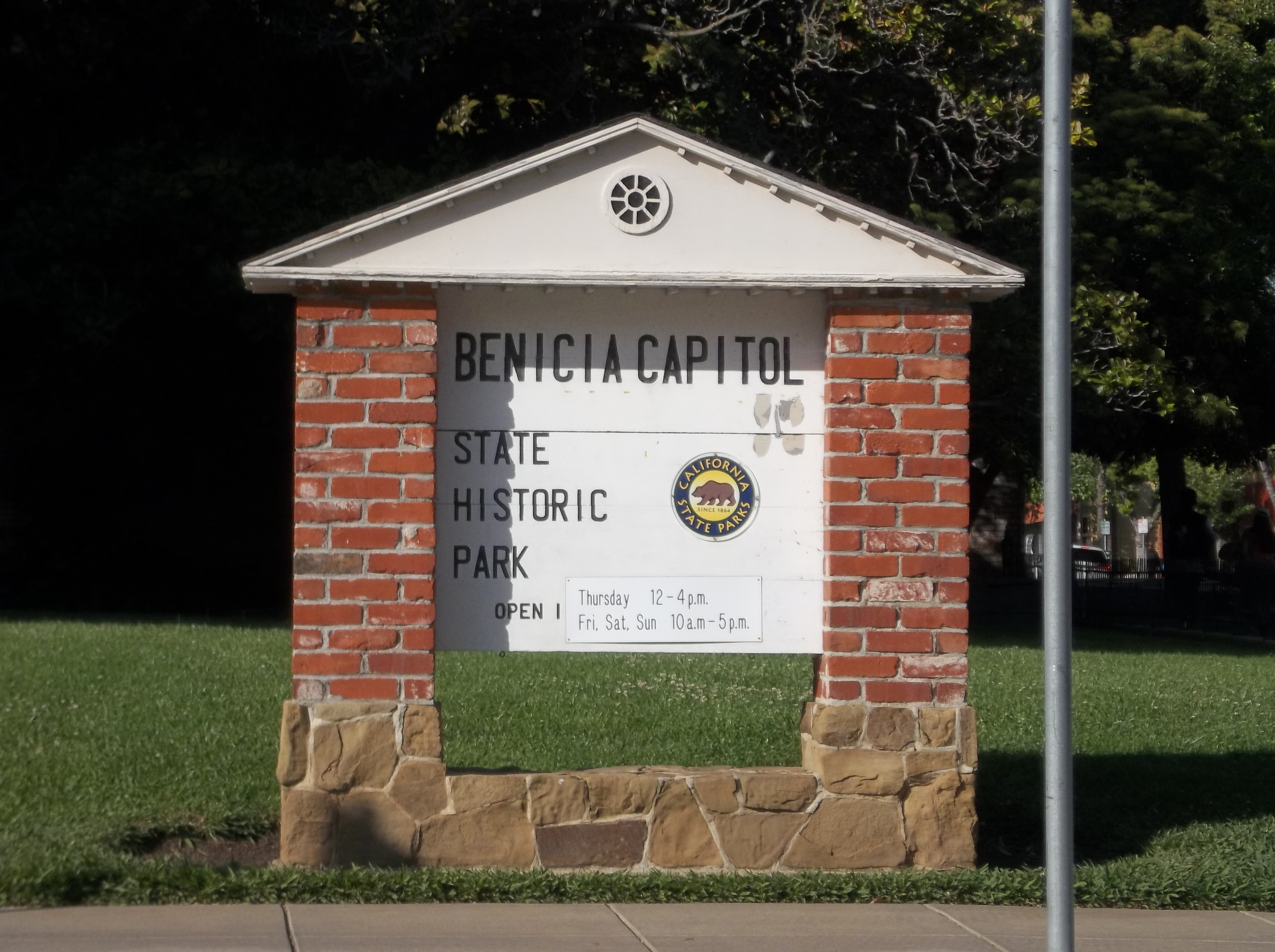
Park sign

== See also ==
- List of California state parks
- California State Legislature
- John Bigler
- Former California State Capitol sites
- California Historical Landmarks in Solano County
