= Leroy H. Vokes =

American soldier in the U.S. Army

- Born: November 12, 1849; Lake County, Illinois, United States
- Died: June 11, 1924
- Military career
- Allegiance: United States of America
- Branch: United States Army
- Service years: c. 1872–1873
- Rank: First Sergeant
- Unit: 3rd U.S. Cavalry
- Conflicts: Indian Wars
- Awards: Medal of Honor

Leroy H. Vokes (November 12, 1849 – June 11, 1924) was an American soldier in the U.S. Army who served with the 3rd U.S. Cavalry during the Indian Wars. A veteran of campaigns against the Plains Indians, he was one of four men who received the Medal of Honor for "gallantry in action" against hostile Indians at the Loupe Fork of the Platte River in Nebraska on April 26, 1872.

== Biography ==
Leroy H. Vokes was born in Lake County, Illinois on November 12, 1849. He later moved to St. Louis, Missouri where he enlisted in the U.S. Army. Volkes was assigned to 3rd U.S. Cavalry and took part in a number of campaigns against the Plains Indians during the early 1870s. On April 26, 1872, Volkes was one of four men received the Medal of Honor for "gallantry in action" battling Indians at the Loupe Fork of the Platte River in Nebraska. The other recipients were Sergeant John H. Foley, Private William H. Strayer and civilian scout William F. "Buffalo Bill" Cody.

== Medal of Honor citation ==
Rank and organization: First Sergeant, Company B, 3d U.S. Cavalry. Place and date: At Loupe Fork, Platte River, Nebr., 26 April 1872. Entered service at:------. Birth: Lake County, Ill. Date of issue: 22 May 1872.

Citation:

Gallantry in action.

== See also ==
- List of Medal of Honor recipients for the Indian Wars
