= Birds Landing, California =

Unincorporated community in California, United States

- Unincorporated community
- location in California Birds Landing, California (the United States)
- Coordinates: 38°7′58″N 121°52′15″W
- Country: United States
- State: California
- County: Solano

Government
  - Senate: Mark DeSaulnier (D)
  - Assembly: Nancy Skinner (D)
  - U. S. Congress: Kevin Kiley (I)
- Elevation: 52 ft (16 m)

Population (2000)
  - Total: 130
- Time zone: UTC-8 (PST)
  - Summer (DST): UTC-7 (PDT)
- ZIP code: 94512
- Area code: 707

Birds Landing (also Bird's Landing) is an unincorporated community in southern Solano County, California, United States. It lies at the intersection of Collinsville and Montezuma Hills Roads, southeast of the city of Fairfield, the county seat of Solano County. Situated just north of the Sacramento River, the community is located midway between Sacramento and San Francisco. Birds Landing has its own ZIP code (94512) but presently no post office; the previous post office closed in 2001.

== History ==
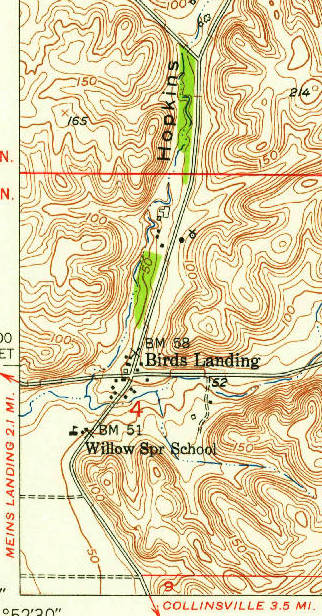
Birds Landing in 1953

This area served as a shipping point for John Bird, who had a storage and commission business.

== Demographics ==
The population was 130 in 2000; there were 66 men and 64 women. The generational makeup was 7 under five years, 8 five to nine years, 10 ten to fourteen, 11 fifteen to nineteen, 13 twenty to twenty-four, 10 twenty-five to thirty-four, 18 thirty-five to forty-four, 24 forty-five to fifty-four, 8 fifty-five to fifty-nine, 6 sixty to sixty-four, 11 sixty-four to seventy-four, 4 seventy-five to eighty-four, and 0 over the age of eighty-five. The median age was 41.3. Of the 100 over the age of eighteen, 53 were male and 47 were female. 92 were twenty-one and over. 15 were over the age of sixty-five, with 8 males and 7 females. The average owner-owned home housed 2.45 people, compared to 3.62 for renter-occupied homes.

47% of the population spoke English as their primary language while 53% did not; of those 53%, 29% spoke Spanish and 24% spoke "Other Indic languages".

== Gallery ==
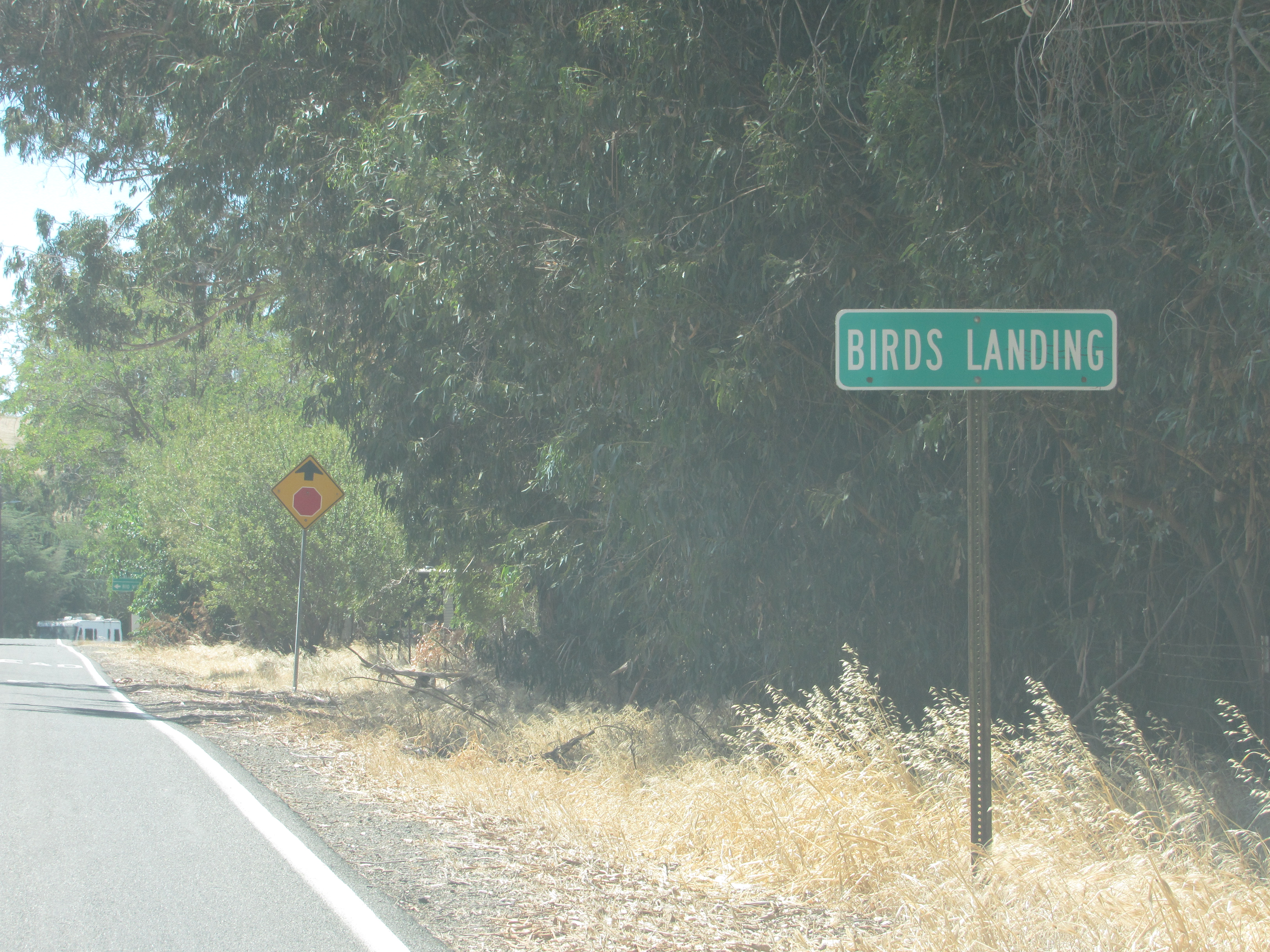
Birds Landing, California

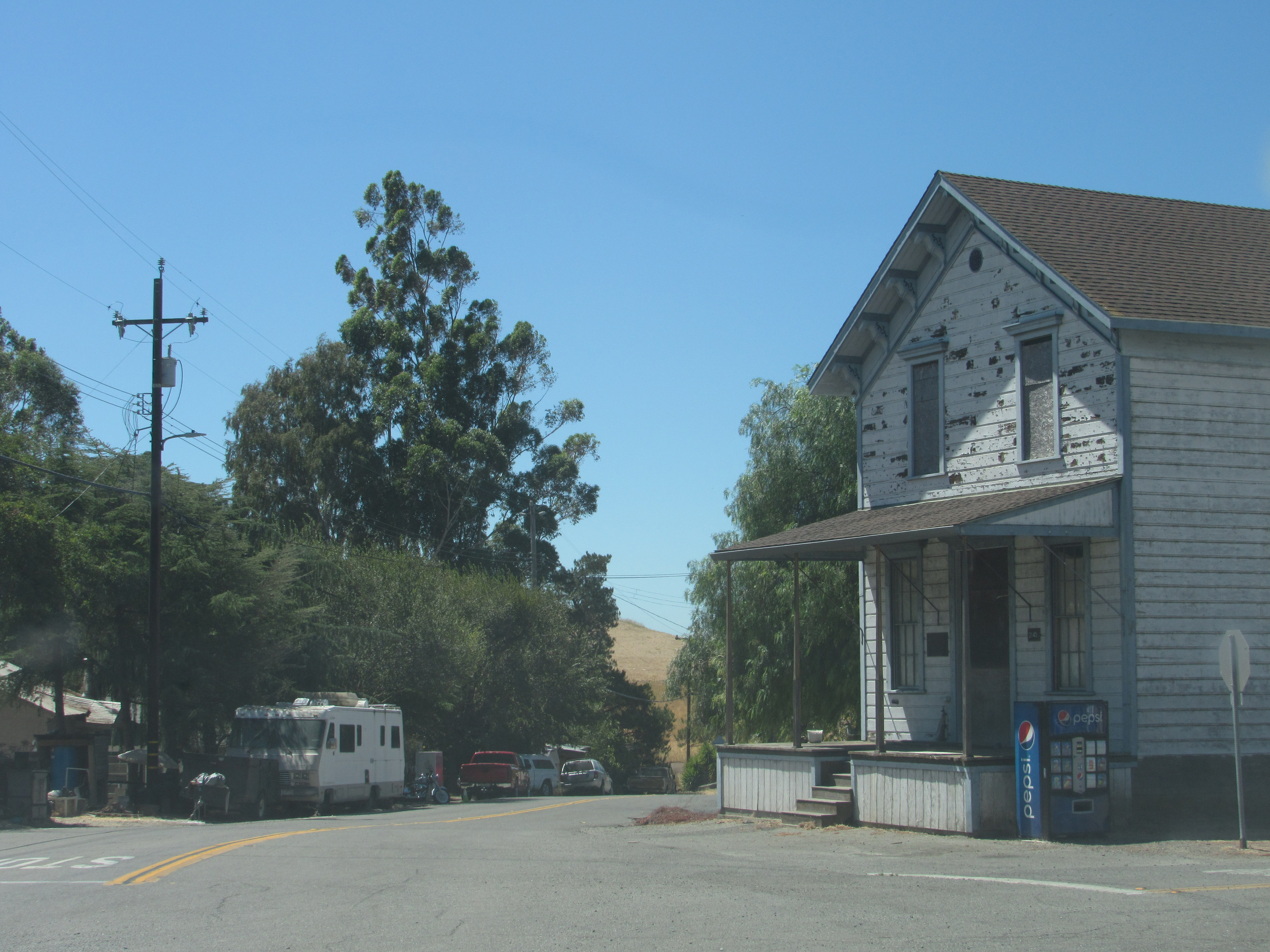
Bird and Dinkelspiel Store in Birds Landing, California

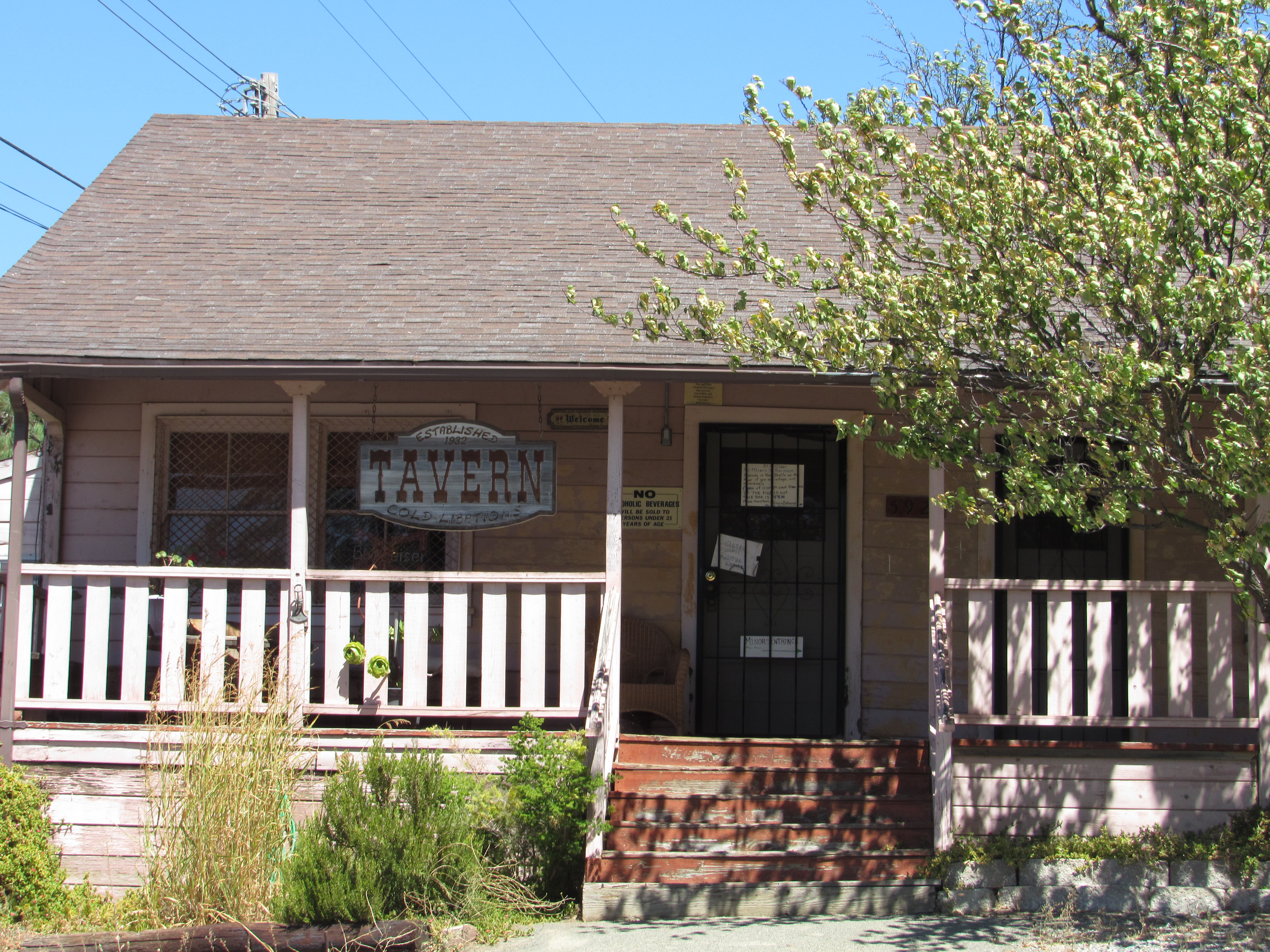
Shirley's Tavern in Birds Landing, California

== See also ==
- Shiloh Wind Power Plant
