= Juan Peña =

Juan Peña may refer to:

- Juan Peña (baseball) (born 1977), Dominican major league baseball player
- Juan Manuel Peña (born 1973), Bolivian soccer player
- Juan Peña (weightlifter) (born 1992), Dominican Republic weightlifter
- Juan Felipe Peña, designer of the Peña Adobe at Peña Adobe Park
