= Winters, California =

City in California, United States

- City
- City of Winters
- Downtown Winters
- Interactive map of Winters, California
- Location in the State of Ca Location in the contiguous United States
- Coordinates: 38°31′30″N 121°58′15″W
- Country: United States
- State: California
- County: Yolo
- Incorporated: February 9, 1898

Government
  - Mayor: Wade Cowan
  - State senator: Christopher Cabaldon (D)
  - Assemblymember: Cecilia Aguiar-Curry (D)
  - U. S. rep.: Mike Thompson (D)

Area
  - Total: 2.96 sq mi (7.67 km^{2})
  - Land: 2.93 sq mi (7.60 km^{2})
  - Water: 0.023 sq mi (0.06 km^{2}) 0.84%
- Elevation: 135 ft (41 m)

Population (2020)
  - Total: 7,115
  - Estimate (2024): 7,825
  - Density: 2,424.2/sq mi (936.0/km^{2})
- Time zone: UTC−8 (Pacific)
  - Summer (DST): UTC−7 (PDT)
- ZIP code: 95694
- Area code: 530
- FIPS code: 06-86034
- GNIS feature IDs: 1652656, 2412288
- Website: www.cityofwinters.org

Winters is a city in rural Yolo County, and the western Sacramento Valley, in northern California, United States.

Winters has a 2024 population of 7,860. Winters is currently growing at a rate of 2.16% annually and its population has increased by 9.24% since the most recent census, which recorded a population of 7,195 in 2020.

The average household income in Winters is $148,333 with a poverty rate of 6.55%. The median age in Winters is 37.9 years: 38.1 years for males, and 37.9 years for females.

== Geography ==
Winters is a small city located on Putah Creek in the western Sacramento Valley, near the California Coastal Range.

It is situated along Interstate 505, 11 miles (18 km) from Vacaville. Winters is nearly 30 miles (50 km) from Sacramento and approximately 60 miles (100 km) from San Francisco, California. It is located at 38°31′30″N 121°58′15″W.

According to the United States Census Bureau, the city has a total area of 2.96 square miles (7.7 km^{2}), of which 2.93 square miles (7.6 km^{2}) is land and 0.03 square miles (0.078 km^{2}) (0.84%) is water.

== History ==
William Wolfskill, a Kentucky immigrant to Mexican Alta California, received a Mexican land grant for Rancho Rio de los Putos in 1842 from Governor Juan Bautista Alvarado. His brother, John Reid Wolfskill, started the agricultural development of the Sacramento Valley by planting orchards and vineyards on his lands. In 1849, William Wolfskill transferred half of Rancho Rio de los Putos to John Wolfskill, and transferred the rest to his brother in 1854.

The Winters post office was established in 1875. Winters incorporated in 1898. The name honors Theodore Winters, whose ranch provided half of the town's land.

In 1935, Wolfskill's heirs deeded 100 acres of the Wolfskill Ranch in Winters to the University of California, Davis, which had been founded in 1908. The land was to be used for an experimental orchard.

== Climate ==
Winters has hot, mostly dry summers and cool, wet winters. According to the Köppen climate classification system, Winters has a hot-summer Mediterranean climate (Csa). Average January temperatures are a maximum of 55.2 °F (12.9 °C) and a minimum of 37.0 °F (2.8 °C). Average July temperatures are a maximum of 96.7 °F (35.9 °C) and a minimum of 59.8 °F (15.4 °C). There are an average of 102.0 days with highs of 90 °F (32 °C) or higher and an average of 20.3 days with lows of 32 °F (0 °C). The record high temperature was 115 °F (46 °C) on June 16, 1961, and July 14, 1972. The record low temperature was 15 °F (−9 °C) on December 23, 1990.

Average annual precipitation is 21.94 inches (557 mm). There are an average of 64 days with measurable precipitation. The wettest year was 1983 with 47.12 inches (1,197 mm) and the driest year was 1976 with 6.60 inches (168 mm). The most rainfall in one month was 17.21 inches (437 mm) in January 1995. The most rainfall in 24 hours was 7.25 inches (184 mm) on March 29, 1907. Snowfall is a rarity in Winters, but 3.3 inches (8.4 cm) fell in January 1973 and 1.0 inch (2.5 cm) fell in December 1988.

Climate data for Winters, California (1991–2020 normals, extremes 1942–present)
Month	Jan	Feb	Mar	Apr	May	Jun	Jul	Aug	Sep	Oct	Nov	Dec	Year
Record high °F (°C)	82 (28)	84 (29)	92 (33)	99 (37)	108 (42)	115 (46)	115 (46)	113 (45)	112 (44)	106 (41)	90 (32)	79 (26)	115 (46)
Mean daily maximum °F (°C)	56.5 (13.6)	62.0 (16.7)	67.9 (19.9)	74.2 (23.4)	82.5 (28.1)	90.1 (32.3)	95.3 (35.2)	94.5 (34.7)	90.9 (32.7)	80.5 (26.9)	66.4 (19.1)	56.8 (13.8)	76.5 (24.7)
Daily mean °F (°C)	47.0 (8.3)	51.3 (10.7)	56.0 (13.3)	60.8 (16.0)	67.7 (19.8)	74.0 (23.3)	77.4 (25.2)	76.7 (24.8)	73.7 (23.2)	65.4 (18.6)	54.3 (12.4)	47.0 (8.3)	62.6 (17.0)
Mean daily minimum °F (°C)	37.5 (3.1)	40.5 (4.7)	44.1 (6.7)	47.5 (8.6)	52.9 (11.6)	57.9 (14.4)	59.5 (15.3)	58.8 (14.9)	56.6 (13.7)	50.2 (10.1)	42.2 (5.7)	37.3 (2.9)	48.8 (9.3)
Record low °F (°C)	18 (−8)	20 (−7)	24 (−4)	29 (−2)	32 (0)	41 (5)	46 (8)	40 (4)	38 (3)	32 (0)	25 (−4)	12 (−11)	12 (−11)
Average precipitation inches (mm)	5.15 (131)	5.04 (128)	3.21 (82)	1.38 (35)	0.80 (20)	0.15 (3.8)	0.01 (0.25)	0.02 (0.51)	0.09 (2.3)	0.87 (22)	2.19 (56)	4.86 (123)	23.77 (604)
Average snowfall inches (cm)	0.0 (0.0)	0.0 (0.0)	0.0 (0.0)	0.0 (0.0)	0.0 (0.0)	0.0 (0.0)	0.0 (0.0)	0.0 (0.0)	0.0 (0.0)	0.0 (0.0)	0.0 (0.0)	0.0 (0.0)	0.0 (0.0)
Average precipitation days (≥ 0.01 in)	14.5	11.5	10.2	6.2	4.1	1.1	0.1	0.3	0.8	3.4	8.4	12.9	73.5
Average snowy days (≥ 0.1 in)	0.0	0.0	0.0	0.0	0.0	0.0	0.0	0.0	0.0	0.0	0.0	0.0	0.0
Source: NOAA

== Government ==
Federal

- California's 4th congressional district

State

- California's 3rd State Senate district
- California's 4th State Assembly district

City

The current elected members of the Winters City Council are:

- Mayor — Albert Vallecillo
- Mayor Pro-Tempore — Bill Biasi
- Council Member — Jesse Loren
- Council Member — Richard Casavecchia
- Council Member — Carol Scianna

Other elected or appointed city officials include:

- City Manager — Jeremy Craig
- Police Chief John P. Miller
- Fire Chief Jack Snyder

== Economy ==
=== Top employers ===
According to Winters' 2017 Comprehensive Annual Financial Report, the top employers in the city are:

#	Employer	# of Employees
1	Mariani Nut Company	350
2	Winters Joint Unified School District	235
3	Buckhorn Restaurant Group	120
4	Double M Trucking	75
5	City of Winters	55

== Demographics ==
Historical population
Census	Pop.	Note	%±
1880	523		—
1900	785		—
1910	910		15.9%
1920	903		−0.8%
1930	896		−0.8%
1940	1,133		26.5%
1950	1,265		11.7%
1960	1,700		34.4%
1970	2,419		42.3%
1980	2,652		9.6%
1990	4,639		74.9%
2000	6,125		32.0%
2010	6,624		8.1%
2020	7,115		7.4%
2024 (est.)	7,825	▲	10.0%
U.S. Decennial Census

=== 2020 census ===
As of the 2020 census, Winters had a population of 7,115. The population density was 2,424.2 inhabitants per square mile (936.0/km^{2}).

The census reported that 99.9% of the population lived in households, 0.1% lived in non-institutionalized group quarters, and no one was institutionalized. 99.4% of residents lived in urban areas, while 0.6% lived in rural areas.

There were 2,420 households, out of which 41.0% included children under the age of 18. Of all households, 58.5% were married-couple households, 5.8% were cohabiting couple households, 12.9% had a male householder with no spouse or partner present, and 22.8% had a female householder with no spouse or partner present. About 17.1% of all households were made up of individuals, and 7.6% had someone living alone who was 65 years of age or older. The average household size was 2.94. There were 1,865 families (77.1% of all households).

The age distribution was 24.8% under the age of 18, 7.7% aged 18 to 24, 26.6% aged 25 to 44, 26.3% aged 45 to 64, and 14.6% who were 65 years of age or older. The median age was 37.7 years. For every 100 females, there were 98.3 males, and for every 100 females age 18 and over there were 94.5 males age 18 and over.

There were 2,535 housing units at an average density of 863.7 units per square mile (333.5 units/km^{2}), of which 2,420 (95.5%) were occupied. Of these, 66.4% were owner-occupied and 33.6% were occupied by renters. Of all housing units, 4.5% were vacant. The homeowner vacancy rate was 1.9% and the rental vacancy rate was 3.1%.

Racial composition as of the 2020 census
Race	Number	Percent
White	3,378	47.5%
Black or African American	40	0.6%
American Indian and Alaska Native	203	2.9%
Asian	93	1.3%
Native Hawaiian and Other Pacific Islander	15	0.2%
Some other race	2,020	28.4%
Two or more races	1,366	19.2%
Hispanic or Latino (of any race)	3,935	55.3%

=== 2023 estimates ===
In 2023, the US Census Bureau estimated that 19.3% of the population were foreign-born. Of all people aged 5 or older, 57.4% spoke only English at home, 41.0% spoke Spanish, 0.9% spoke other Indo-European languages, and 0.6% spoke Asian or Pacific Islander languages. Of those aged 25 or older, 87.2% were high school graduates and 29.8% had a bachelor's degree.

The median household income was $132,650, and the per capita income was $49,451. About 2.5% of families and 6.2% of the population were below the poverty line.

== Education ==
The city is served by the Winters Joint Unified School District.

== Notable people ==
- Robert Crumb, cartoonist, lived in Winters until 1991
- Frank Demaree, Major League Baseball player
- Robert Craig McNamara, owner of Sierra Orchards and son of Robert S. McNamara, Secretary of the Department of Defense
- Catherine Squires Microbiologist, Moved to Winters 2009
- John Reid Wolfskill, Winters pioneer

== See also ==
- 1892 Vacaville–Winters earthquakes
- Winters Express
