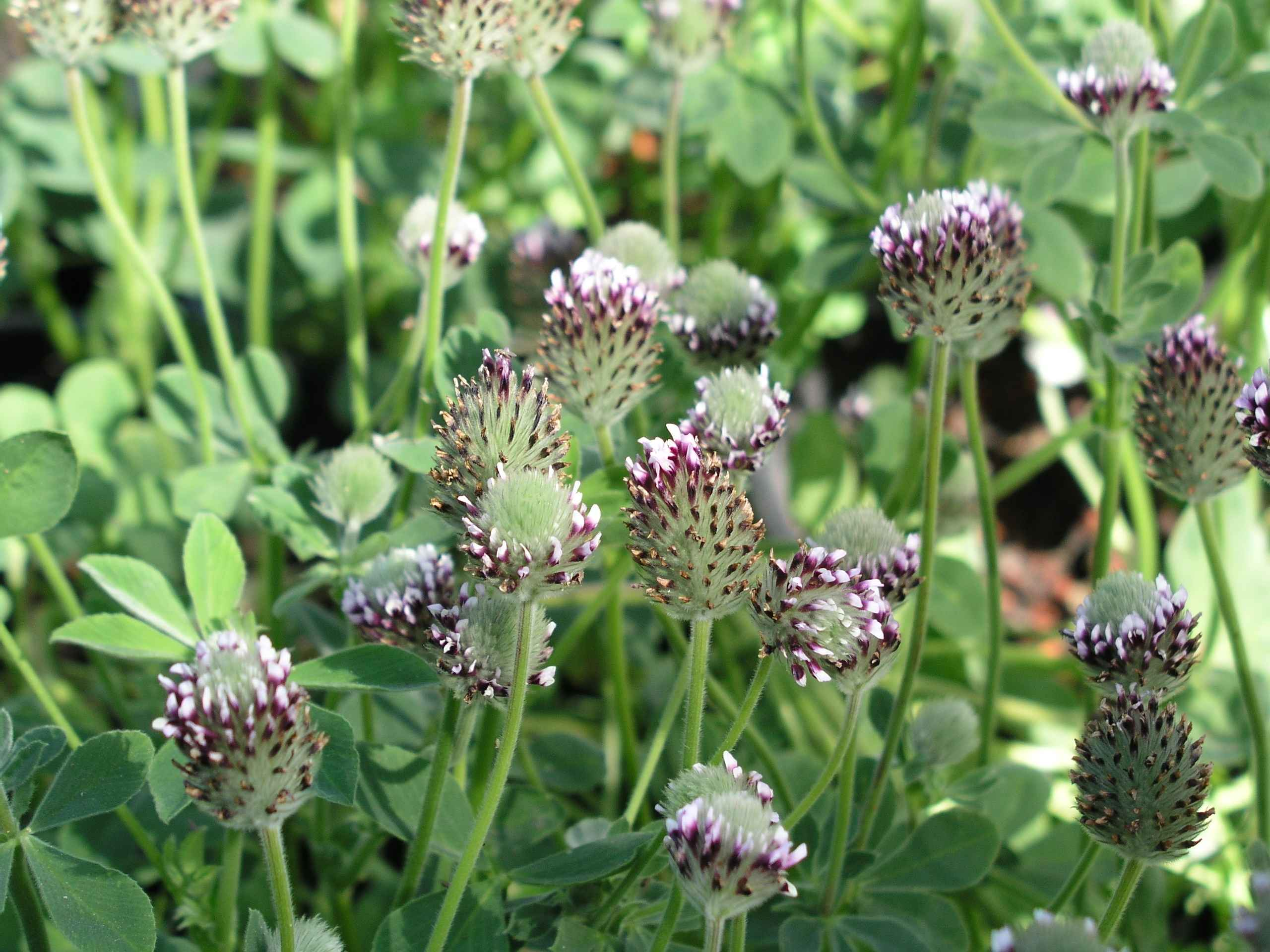

Conservation status
- Critically Imperiled (NatureServe)

Scientific classification
- Kingdom: Plantae
- Clade: Embryophytes
- Clade: Tracheophytes
- Clade: Spermatophytes
- Clade: Angiosperms
- Clade: Eudicots
- Clade: Rosids
- Order: Fabales
- Family: Fabaceae
- Subfamily: Faboideae
- Genus: Trifolium
- Species: T. amoenum

Binomial name
- Trifolium amoenum Greene

= Trifolium amoenum =

Species of flowering plant

Trifolium amoenum, known by the common names showy Indian clover and two-fork clover, is endemic to California, and is an endangered annual herb that subsists in grassland areas of the San Francisco Bay Area and the northern California Coast Ranges.

== Description ==
This wildflower has an erect growth habit. The flower head is somewhat spherical with a diameter of about 2.5 centimeters (1 in). The petals are purple gradating to white tips.

== Distribution and habitat ==
Edward Lee Greene collected the first recorded specimen of Trifolium amoenum in 1890 in Vacaville, California (in Solano County). Its historical range was from the western extreme of the Sacramento Valley in Solano County west and north to Marin and Sonoma Counties, where many sites were presumed extirpated by urban and agricultural development.

It is typically found on heavy soils at elevations less than 100 meters (330 ft).

== Conservation ==
From further expansion of the human population, T. amoenum had become a rare species by the mid-1900s. Through the late 1900s, the number of distinct populations dwindled to about 20 in number, from pressure of human population growth and urban development.

=== Rediscovery ===
By 1993, T. amoenum was thought to be extinct after the depletion of the population in Vacaville, but it was rediscovered by Peter Connors in the form of a single plant on a site in western Sonoma County. The seeds from this single specimen were used to grow more organisms.

The Sonoma County location has been developed and any plants remaining there have been extirpated. Presently there is only a single extant population, subsequently discovered in 1996 in northern Marin County, which numbers approximately 200 plants.

Trifolium amoenum became a federally listed endangered species in 1997. Recent conservation research on the species has been conducted by the Bodega Marine Laboratory.

== See also ==
- Americano Creek
- List of California native plants
- Vernal pool
