= Peña Adobe Park =

Park and Historical place in Solano County, United States

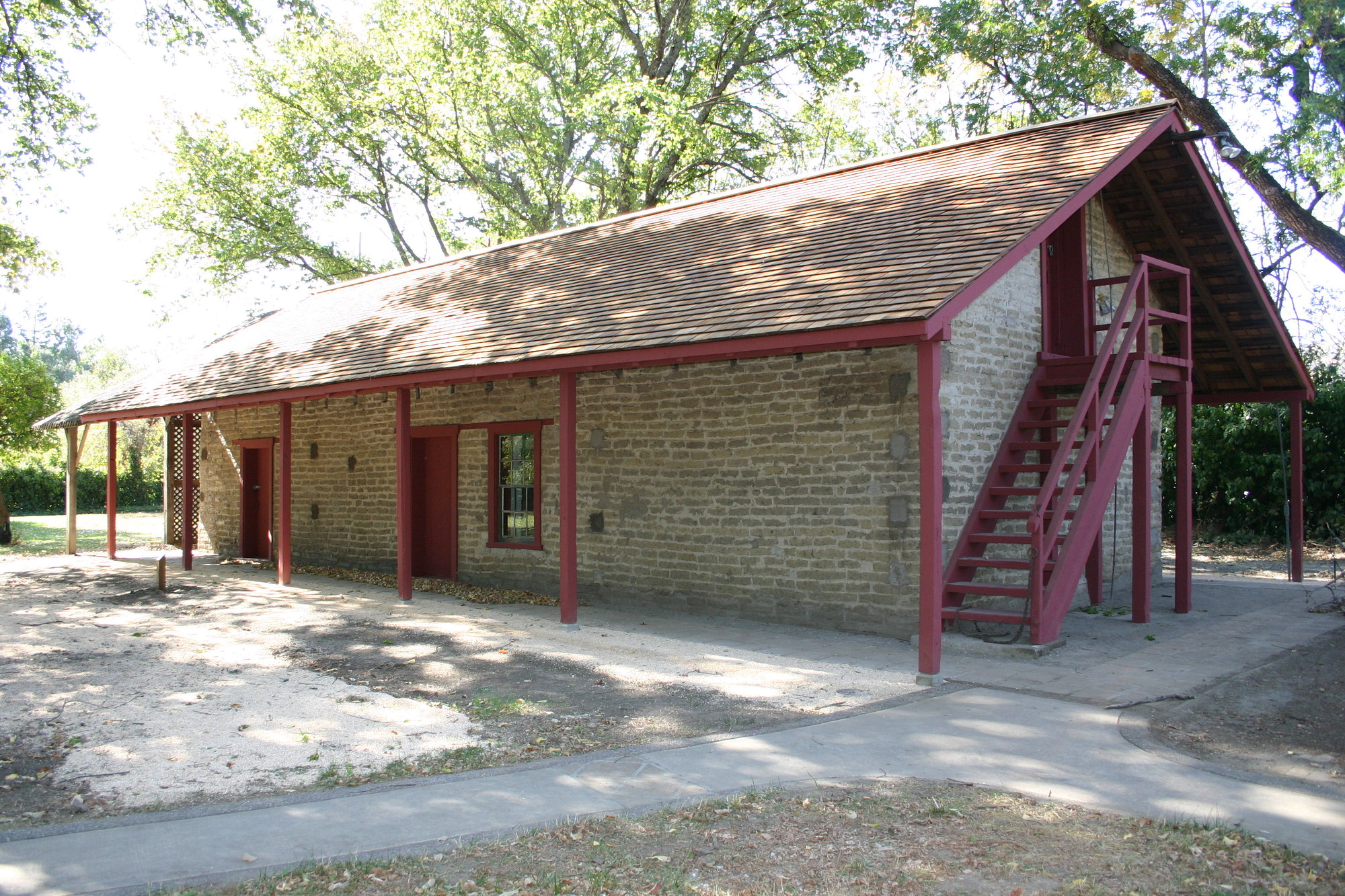
- Peña Adobe

- Location within California Location within the United States
- 38.33729°N 122.0155°W
- Location: 4699 Pena Adobe Road, Vacaville, California

History
- Built: 1843, 183 years ago

Site notes
- Architectural style: Peña Adobe Historical Society

Peña Adobe Park (Peña Adobe Regional Park) is a 8-acre park (3.2 ha) in Vacaville, California. The Peña Adobe Regional Park has a Vaca-Peña Adobe Visitor Center and has 40 miles of trails. Peña Adobe Park is in the 306-acre Lagoon Valley Park (124 ha). The parks were part of Juan Felipe Peña land grant Rancho Los Putos. The park is both a recreational park and place with historical sites.

== Description ==
Peña Adobe Park has:

- Peña Adobe (Vaca-Peña Adobe) a National Register of Historic Places
- Pioneer monument to Edwin Markham
- The Pioneer Monument
- Mowers-Goheen Museum
- Willis Linn Jepson Memorial Garden
- Indian Council Ground
- Pioneer monument to Edwin Markham
- Peñas Point Trail
- Bear Valley Loop Trail
- BBQ Grills
- Biking Trails
- Hiking Trails
- Horseshoe Pits
- Open Space Fields
- Public Restrooms
- Picnic Shelters for rent
- Outdoor amphitheater

== Lagoon Valley Park ==
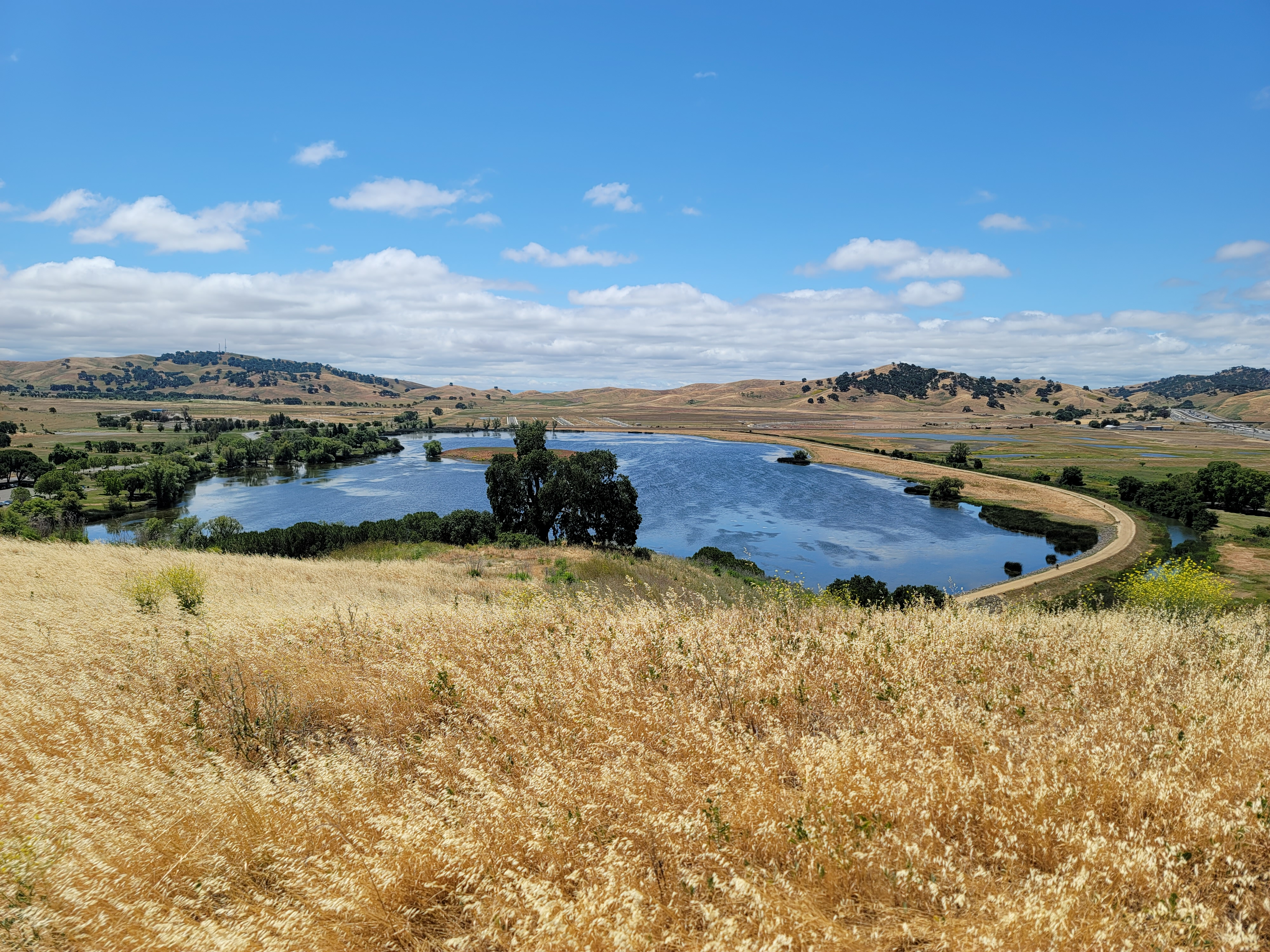
A view from a hiking trail of the Lagoon

Lagoon Valley Park has:

- Peña Adobe Community Center
- Marsh Creek Trail
- Prunus Loop Trail
- Quercus Trail
- Thleynanti Trail
- Horseshoe pits
- Lagoon Lake: a 100-acre artificial reservoir. Fishing and non-motorized boating such as kayaking are permitted there.
- Archery
- Electric model flying field
- Disc golf - 27-hole
- Large dog park
- Bike trails
- Equestrian trails

== Peña Adobe Cemetery ==
In the Peña Adobe Park is the historical site on the northern trail of Peña Adobe Park. Pena Adobe Cemetery is a historic graveyard. Peña Adobe Cemetery has been moved a few times. For some years it was disrepair. From 1917 to 1920 the 30,000-square-foot graveyard had about 389 wooden marked graves abandoned and the site used for sheep grazing by rancher, William B. O’Connor who had bought the land. The graves were moved in May 1966. The old Cemetery in Peña Adobe Park is a 38.33888°N 122.01269°W

== Jack Hume Grove ==
In the Peña Adobe Park is the Historical Jack Hume Grove named after William Jack and Charles Hume built in 1850. Jack Hume grew crops on the land including fruit, vegetables and nuts. In 1897 a railroad line was built at Jack Hume Grove to move his crops to San Francisco for sale. The site of Jack Hume Grove is on the northern trail of Peña Adobe Park at 38.33988°N 122.010694°W .

== Historic Markers ==
- Peña Adobe Park Marker.
- A Rancho Los Putos historic marker, was placed at the site by Native Daughters of the Golden West in working with the California State Park Commission in 1955
- The Pioneer Monument
- William Gordon Huff Marker placed by The Sam Brannan Chapter 1004, Ancient and Honorable Order of E Clampus Vitus on August 16, 1984.
- Unknown Pioneer Ranchers, by City of Vacaville and Yerba Buena Chapter, E Clampus Vitus in 1974.
- The Valley Marker, near park not in park.

== Gallery ==
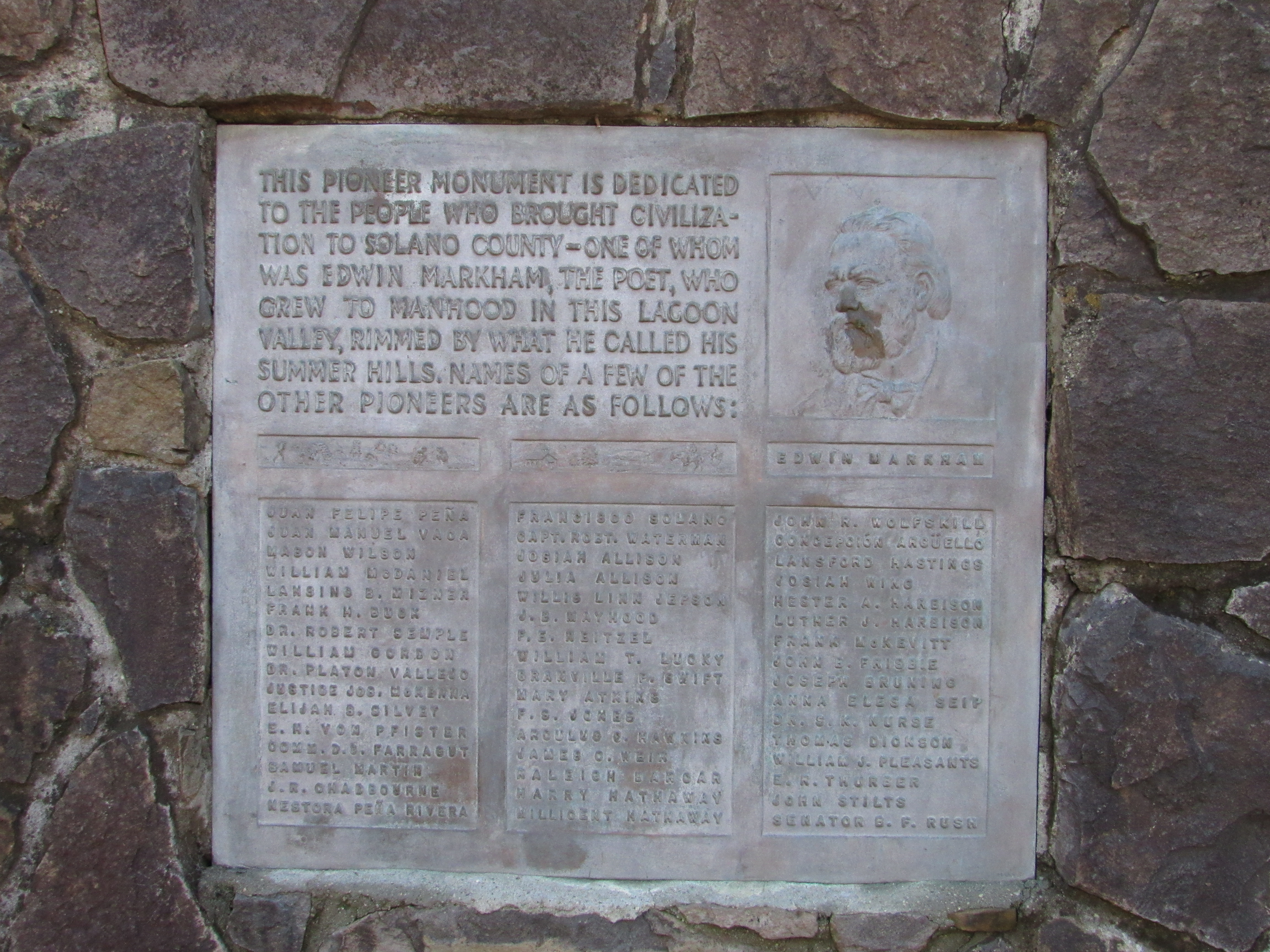
The Pioneer Monument at Pena Adobe Park

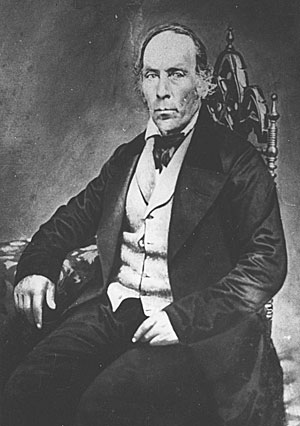
Juan Felipe Peña

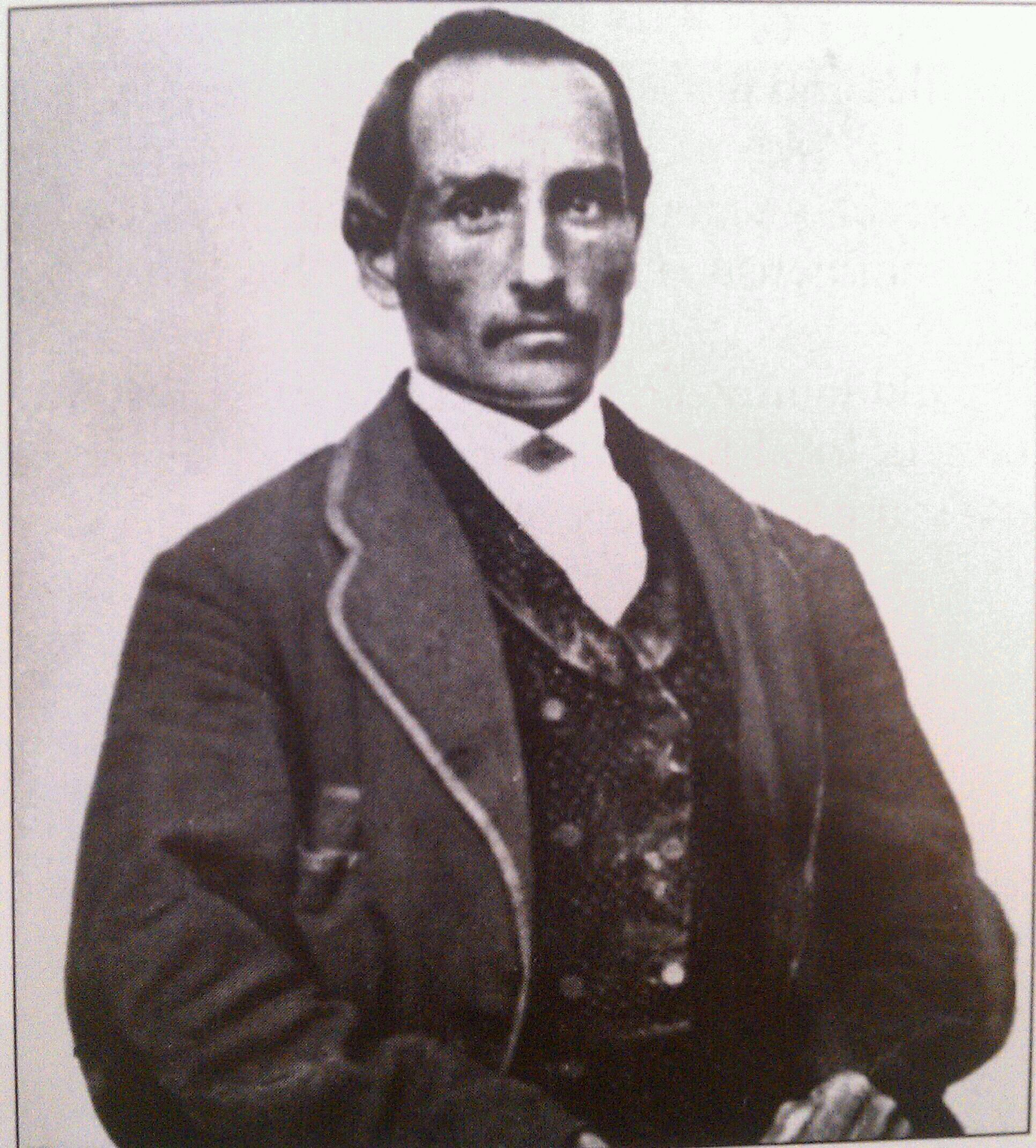
Juan Manuel Vaca, who along with Juan Felipe Peña, owned Rancho Los Putos

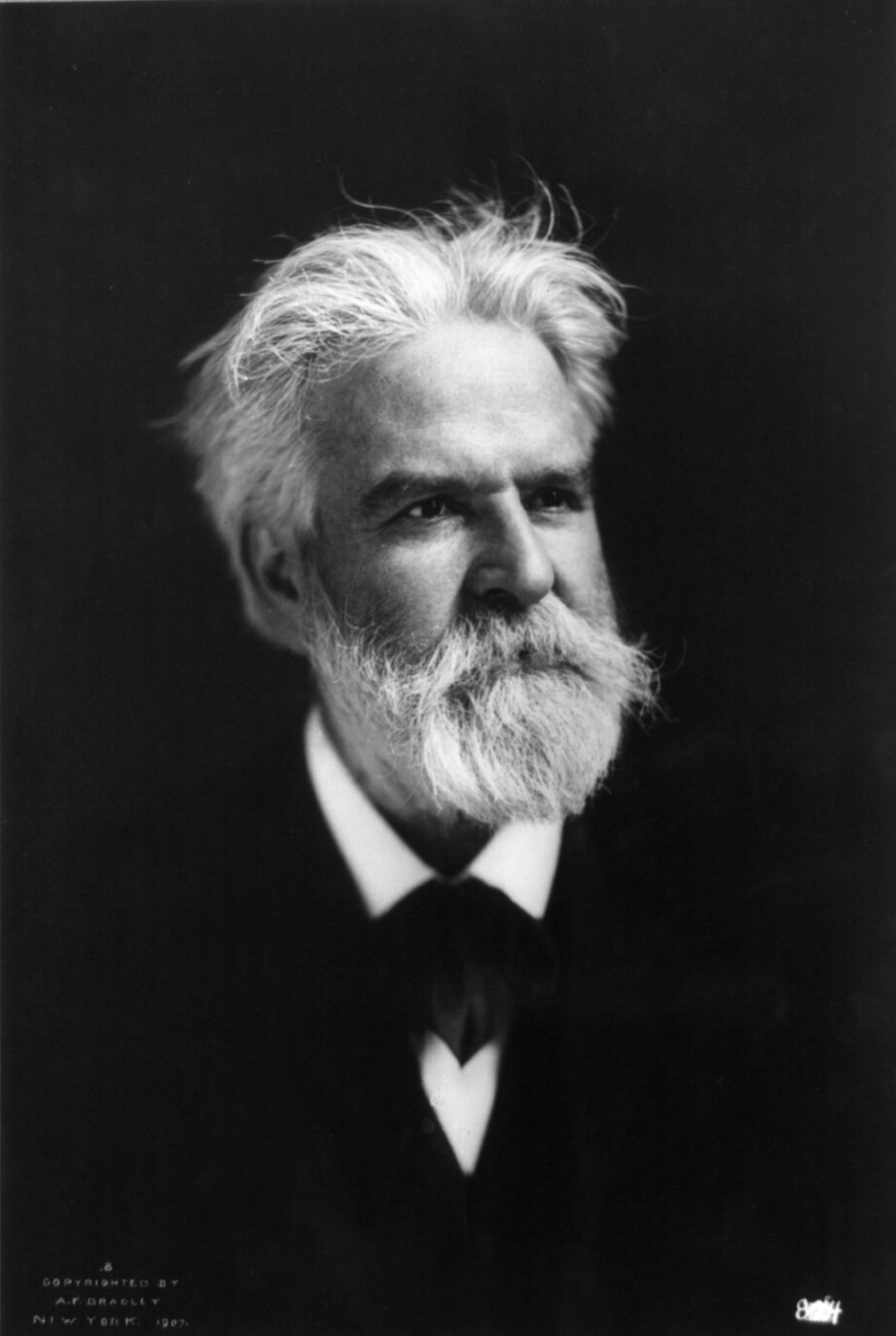
Edwin Markham

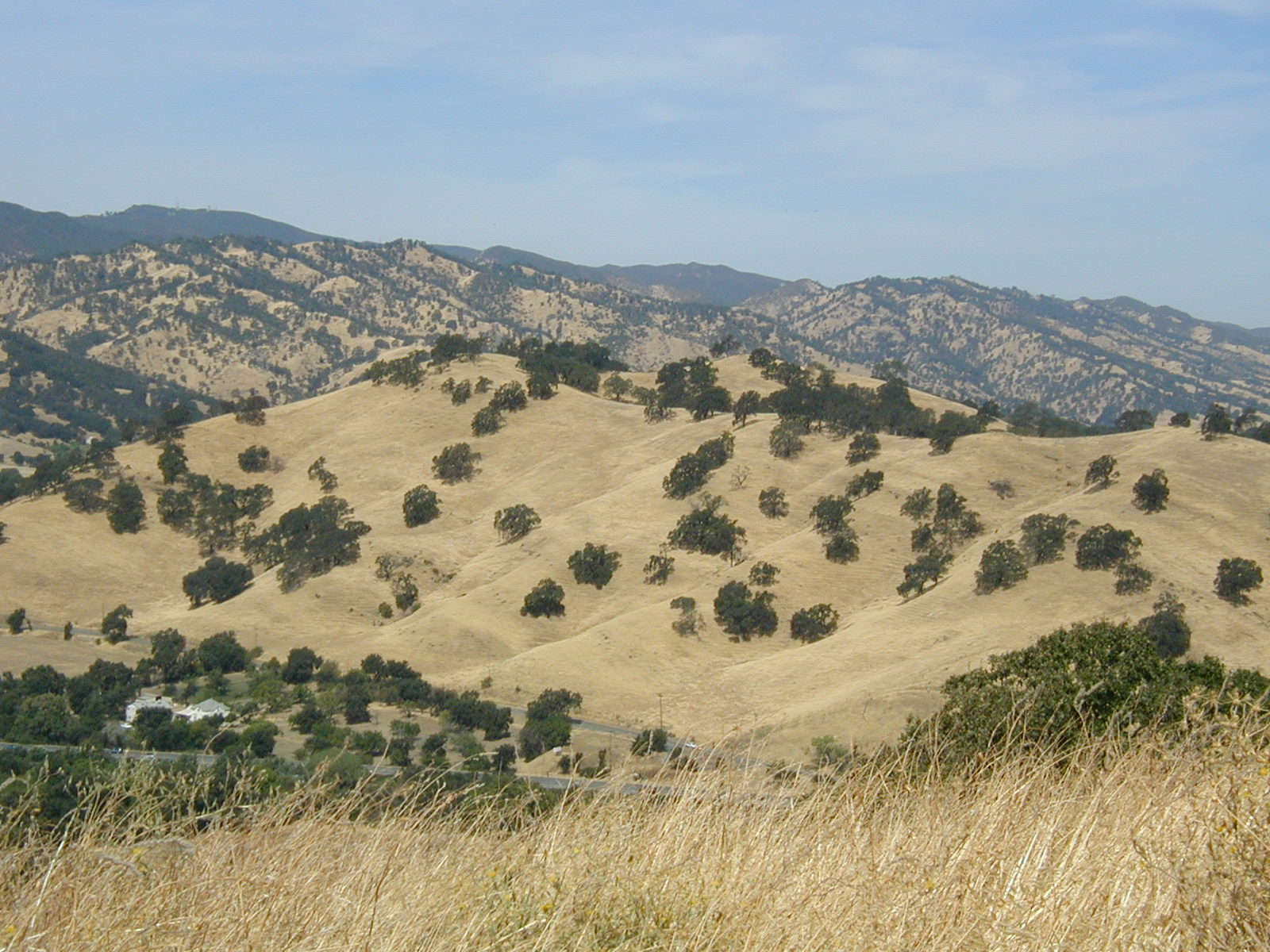
Park Hillsides in Summer

Pena Adobe Park map by NPS in 1966

== See also ==
- California Historical Landmarks in Solano County
- National Register of Historic Places listings in Solano County, California
