= Catherine Squires =

American microbiologist (1941–2021)

- Born: Catherine Louise Kearney; April 9, 1941; Sacramento, California
- Died: August 3, 2021 (aged 80)
- Other name: Cathy Squires
- Education: University of California, Santa Barbara
- Scientific career
- Thesis: Biochemical and genetic study of CRM in the L-arabinose operon (1972)
- Doctoral advisor: Nancy Lee

Catherine Louise Kearney Squires (April 9, 1941 – August 3, 2021) was a microbiologist known for her work on ribosomal RNA using Escherichia coli as a model organism. She was an elected fellow of the American Academy of Microbiology and the American Association for the Advancement of Science.

== Education and career ==
Squires grew up in Winters, California, and attended San Juan High School. She earned a B.A. (1963) and an M.A. (1967) from the University of California, Davis. She then moved to the University of California, Santa Barbara, where she earned her Ph.D. in 1972.

Following her Ph.D. she was a postdoctoral scientist at Stanford University where she worked with Charles Yanofsky. She moved to Dartmouth College in 1974, and subsequently accepted a position at Columbia University in 1977. In 1994, she moved to Tufts University School of Medicine to become chair of the Department of Molecular Biology and Microbiology, and then retired from there in 2007. She returned to Stanford University as a visiting professor until 2009.

Squires was the editor-in-chief of Microbiology and Molecular Biology Reviews from 1997 until 2000.

== Research ==
Squires is known for her research on ribosomal RNA and the tools she established to study the function and structure of ribosomes. She began working on mutants of Escherichia coli while at University of California, Davis where she examined the temperature dependence of growth in the bacterium. While at Stanford, she worked on regulation of the tryptophan operon in Escherichia coli. Her husband, Craig Squires, was experienced in sequencing tRNAs and they collaborated to determine the sequence of β subunit of RNA polymerase and worked on heat shock proteins. Squires' research established a mutant of Escherichia coli (strain Δ7) which had all seven of its rrn operons removed. Squires was a critic of the Human Genome Project and in 1992 she noted the project used funds that could be better applied in other scientific endeavors.

== Selected publications ==
- Bertrand, Kevin; Korn, Laurence; Lee, Frank; Platt, Terry; Squires, Catherine L.; Squires, Craig; Yanofsky, Charles (1975-07-04). "New Features of the Regulation of the Tryptophan Operon: A new type of regulatory site has been studied". Science. 189 (4196): 22–26. doi:10.1126/science.1094538. ISSN 0036-8075. PMID 1094538.
- Squires, C L; Pedersen, S; Ross, B M; Squires, C (1991). "ClpB is the Escherichia coli heat shock protein F84.1". Journal of Bacteriology. 173 (14): 4254–4262. doi:10.1128/jb.173.14.4254-4262.1991. ISSN 0021-9193. PMC 208084. PMID 2066329.
- Condon, C; Squires, C; Squires, C L (1995). "Control of rRNA transcription in Escherichia coli". Microbiological Reviews. 59 (4): 623–645. doi:10.1128/mr.59.4.623-645.1995. ISSN 0146-0749. PMC 239391. PMID 8531889.
- Asai, T.; Zaporojets, D.; Squires, C.; Squires, C. L. (1999-03-02). "An Escherichia coli strain with all chromosomal rRNA operons inactivated: Complete exchange of rRNA genes between bacteria". Proceedings of the National Academy of Sciences. 96 (5): 1971–1976. Bibcode:1999PNAS...96.1971A. doi:10.1073/pnas.96.5.1971. ISSN 0027-8424. PMC 26721. PMID 10051579.

== Awards and honors ==
Squires was elected a fellow of the American Academy of Microbiology (1994) and the American Association for the Advancement of Science (2002).

== Personal life ==
Squires was a fan of Elvis Presley and accumulated Elvis memorabilia while at Tufts University. After her retirement, she moved to Winters, California, in 2009.
