= John Reid Wolfskill =

California pioneer and agriculturalist

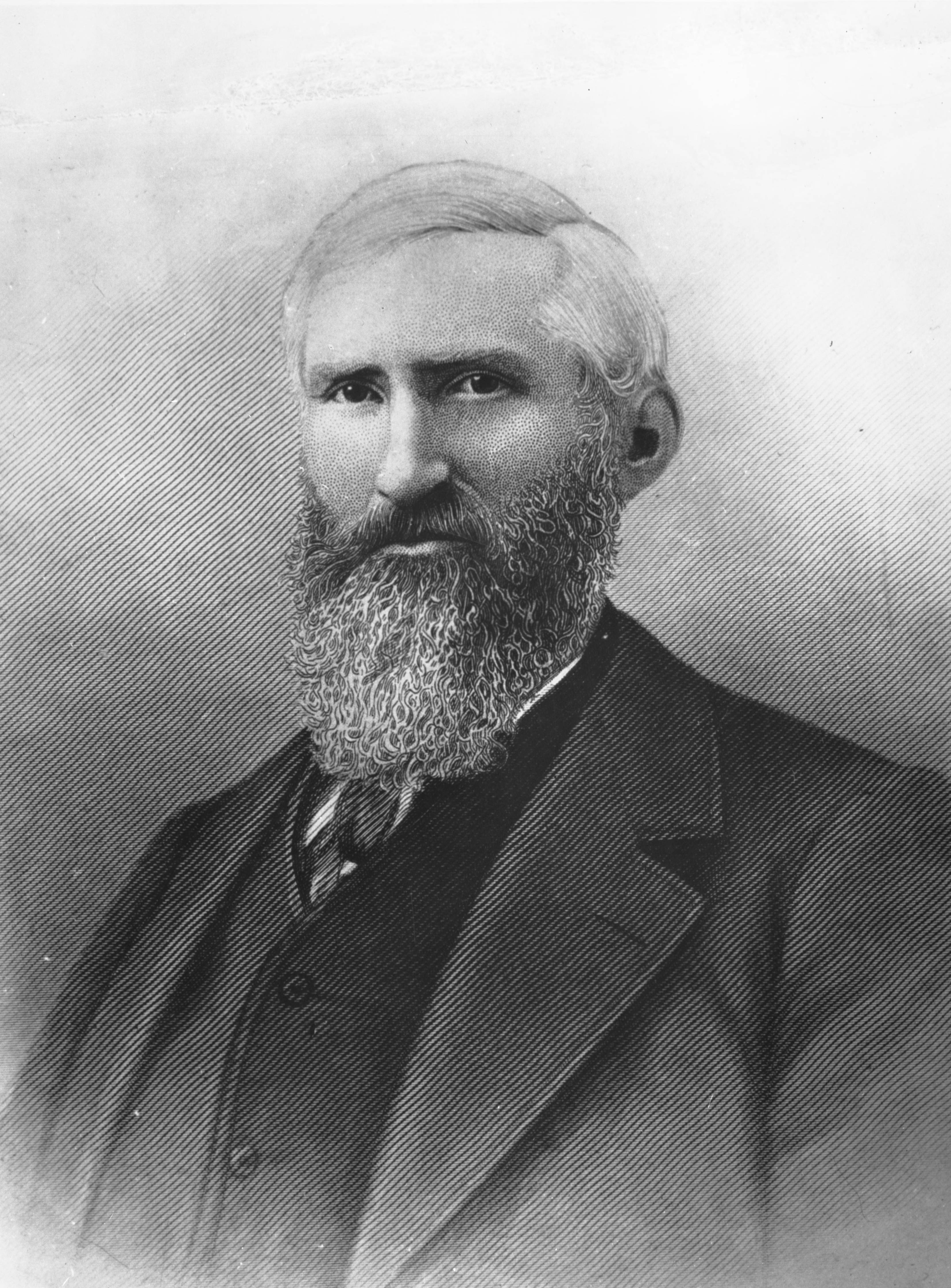
Undated portrait

John Reid Wolfskill (September 16, 1804 – May 27, 1897) was a Mexican-American, California pioneer who helped establish development of California's agricultural industry in the Sacramento Valley in the 19th century. In 1842, Wolfskill was the first settler to plant vineyards and fruit trees there. Born in the Bluegrass region of Kentucky, he migrated to join his brother William in California, where they bought land near Sacramento. Wolfskill became a pioneer of Solano County: "he was the first English speaking man to settle in the area around what is now Winters, California".

His brother, William Wolfskill, had migrated earlier to California and also contributed to its agricultural development, primarily in Southern California in the area of present-day Los Angeles. After they were settled, their younger brothers Milton, Mathus, and Sarchal Wolfskill joined John on his land grant Rancho de los Putos, later renamed as the Wolfskill Ranch. In 1935 Wolfskill's descendants donated 100 acres of the ranch to University of California, Davis for use as an experimental orchard.

== Early years ==
Wolfskill was born near Richmond, Kentucky on September 16, 1804. He was the son of Joseph and Sarah Reid Wolfskill. His paternal grandfather, Joseph Wolfskill, was a native of Germany, who immigrated to Philadelphia, Pennsylvania. Joseph had lived in North Carolina a while, and moved to central Kentucky. Wolfskill's maternal grandfather, John Reid, after whom Wolfskill was named, was a native of Ireland and immigrant to the British colonies. During the American Revolutionary War, he was taken prisoner by the British at Charleston, South Carolina. He later settled in Kentucky.

The Wolfskill family were among early migrants from Kentucky to Missouri in 1809, where they settled at Boone's Lick near the Missouri River west of St. Louis, which was developing rapidly based on the lucrative fur trade. John and his siblings grew up on the frontier.

== Career ==
In 1828, Wolfskill set out from Missouri for Santa Fe, New Mexico, which was still part of independent Mexico. His older brother William Wolfskill had gone there some time before and worked as a fur trapper in the area for ten years. From there John traveled to Paris, Durango, Colorado, also part of Mexico, and to Chihuahua, Mexico. For the next four years, he worked as a guard in Mexico for the transport of silver treasure between Chihuahua and Matamoras, making a total of eleven expeditions.

After some time, Wolfskill took passage from Matamoras by ship to New Orleans, and thence up the Mississippi River, returning to his former home in Missouri. He lived and worked there for two or three years. In 1836, he returned to New Mexico. Planning to buy mules to sell in Missouri, he went to Oposura, Sonora. Indians stole all his mules during his journey. He was trying to raise money to join his brother William in Los Angeles, California, from where John had last heard of him. Wolfskill determined to set out from Santa Fe for California.

Wolfskill's brother William, who had become a naturalized Mexican citizen, was able to own land under the Mexican government rules. He had received a large land grant in May 1842 in that area that developed as Winters, California in what is now Yolo County. After John joined him, they named the property Rancho Rio de los Putos, after a nearby creek. The name was derived by Spanish colonists from Lake Miwok puṭa wuwwe, meaning "grassy creek."

Wolfskill was later joined here by three of their younger brothers; Milton, Mathus, and Sarchal. A 1987 history of Yolo County identifies Wolfskill as the first settler to plant fruit trees and vineyards in this area, in 1842.

According to a biographical note by the University of California, Wolfskill began to cultivate a few crops in 1851 along Putah Creek (formerly called Rio de los Putos by Spanish colonists), along with an orchard and vineyard in the Sacramento Valley. He bought fig, pear and English walnut trees, and grape cuttings in Los Angeles.

Initially he had devoted the rancho chiefly to stock-raising, selling meat supplies to the many mining camps that were booming in the late 1840s and early 1850s during the early mining period. In the 1860s, he and his brothers switched to wheat-growing, and enclosed their land with fences to keep animals out. Wolfskill and his brother, William, divided their interests in the rancho, each taking one-half. John devoted most of his rancho to fruit-culture. A branch railroad was built to cross the ranch not far from Wolfskill's old home, the nearest station being Winters. William was most influential in agricultural development in Los Angeles, where he was mostly based.

== Personal life ==
In 1858, at the age of 54, Wolfskill married Susan Cooper, a daughter of Maj. Stephen Cooper. They had four children together: a son Edward and three daughters, Melinda, Jennie, and Frances.

Wolfskill ultimately divided his ranch among his children. In his last years he lived with his married daughter Frances and her husband Samuel Taylor. Wolfskill died in 1897.

== Legacy ==
- In 1935, Wolfskill's heirs deeded 100 acres of the Wolfskill Ranch in Winters to the University of California, Davis, which had been founded in 1908. The land was to be used for an experimental orchard.

His nephew Timoteo was a partner in the Lazard & Wolfskill dry goods store. It developed as a City of Paris (Los Angeles) department store known as the City of Paris, the first such business in the city.
