= Rancho Rio de los Putos =

Mexican land grant in California

Coordinates: 38.520°N 121.950°W

Rancho Rio de los Putos, (Wolfskill Grant) was a 17,755-acre (71.85 km^{2}) Mexican land grant in the western Sacramento Valley, within present-day Solano County and Yolo County, California. It was given in 1842 by Governor Juan B. Alvarado to William Wolfskill.

The grant extended along both banks of Putah Creek (formerly Rio Los Putos) and encompassed present day Winters. On current maps, the four leagues include 10,750 acres (43.5 km^{2}) on the south side of Putah Creek in Solano County, and 7,005 acres (28.3 km^{2}) on the north side of Putah Creek in Yolo County.

== History ==
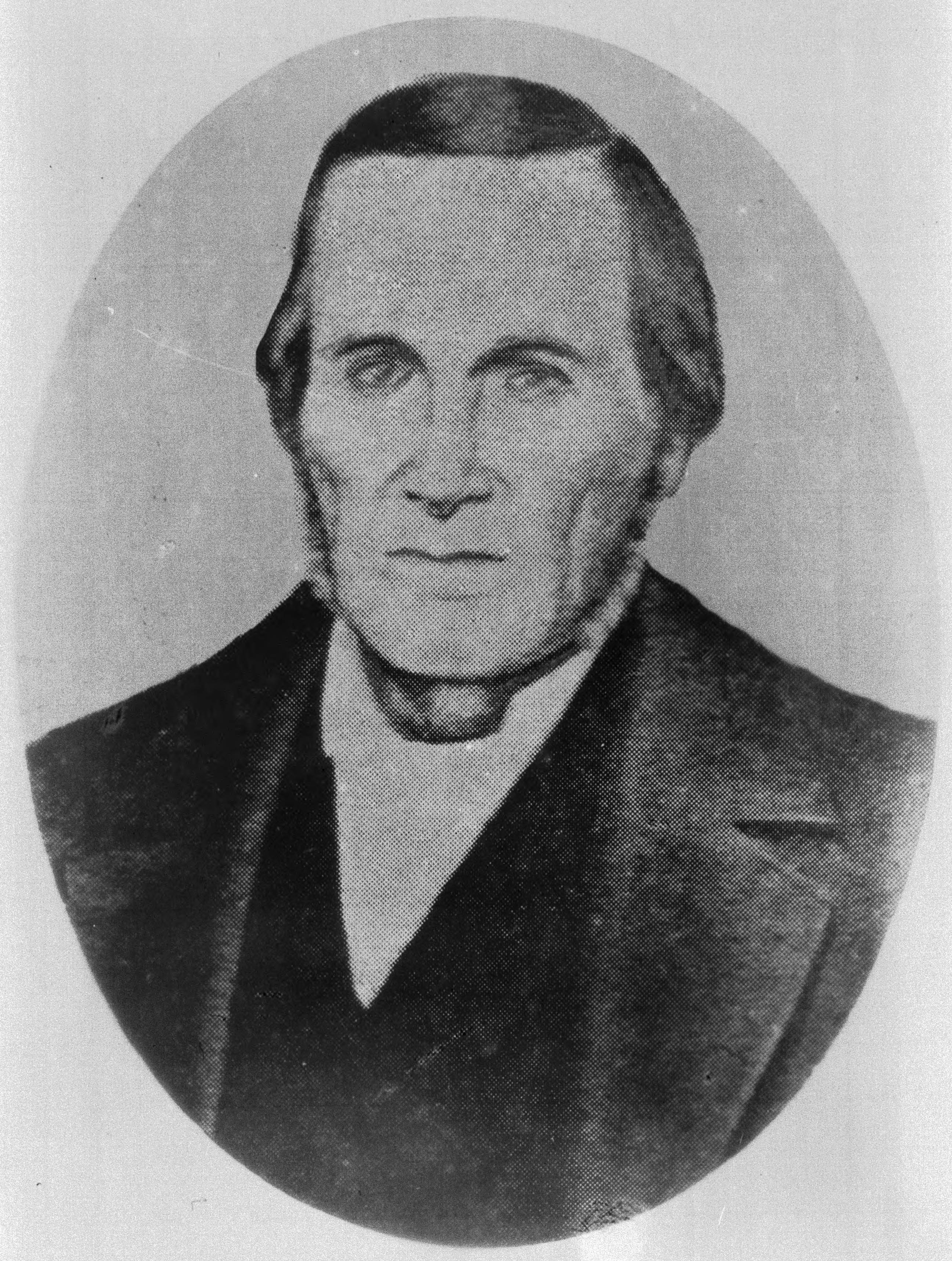
William Wolfskill

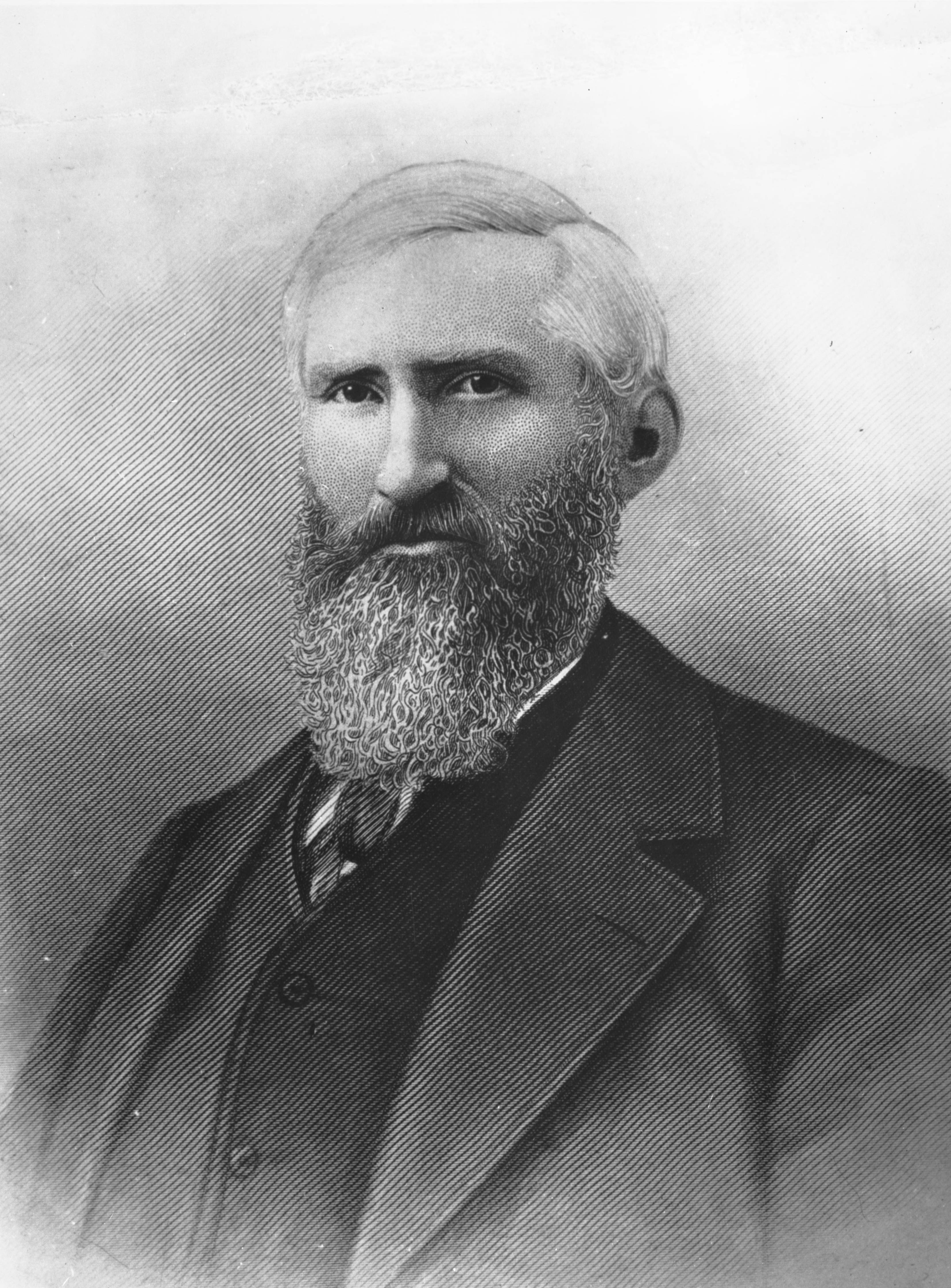
John Wolfskill

John Reid Wolfskill (1804–1897) was born in Kentucky, and in 1828 followed his eldest brother, William Wolfskill to New Mexico. John spent ten years in New Mexico, then joined his brother William in Southern California in 1838. John was not a Mexican citizen and could not receive a land grant. In 1842, Governor Alvarado granted the four square league Rancho Rio de los Putos to William Wolfskill, a Mexican citizen. Brother John set out a short time later with cattle, oxen, a few horses and a satchel of cuttings and seeds to settle on his dream land, and arrived at Putah Creek in mid-July 1842—the first American settler in Solano County.

In 1849, William Wolfskill transferred half of Rancho Rio de los Putos to John, and transferred the rest to John in 1854. With the cession of California to the United States following the Mexican–American War, the 1848 Treaty of Guadalupe Hidalgo provided that the land grants would be honored. As required by the Land Act of 1851, a claim for Rancho Rio de los Putos was filed with the Public Land Commission in 1852, and the grant was patented to William Wolfskill in 1858.

There was a boundary dispute as the grant overlapped the Rancho Los Putos grant of Peña and Vaca. A survey adjusting the boundaries was made in 1858.

== See also ==
- Ranchos of Solano County, California
- Ranchos of Yolo County, California
- Ranchos of California
- List of Ranchos of California
