= Peña Adobe =

- Pena Adobe or Peña Adobe
- U.S. National Register of Historic Places
- California Historical Landmark
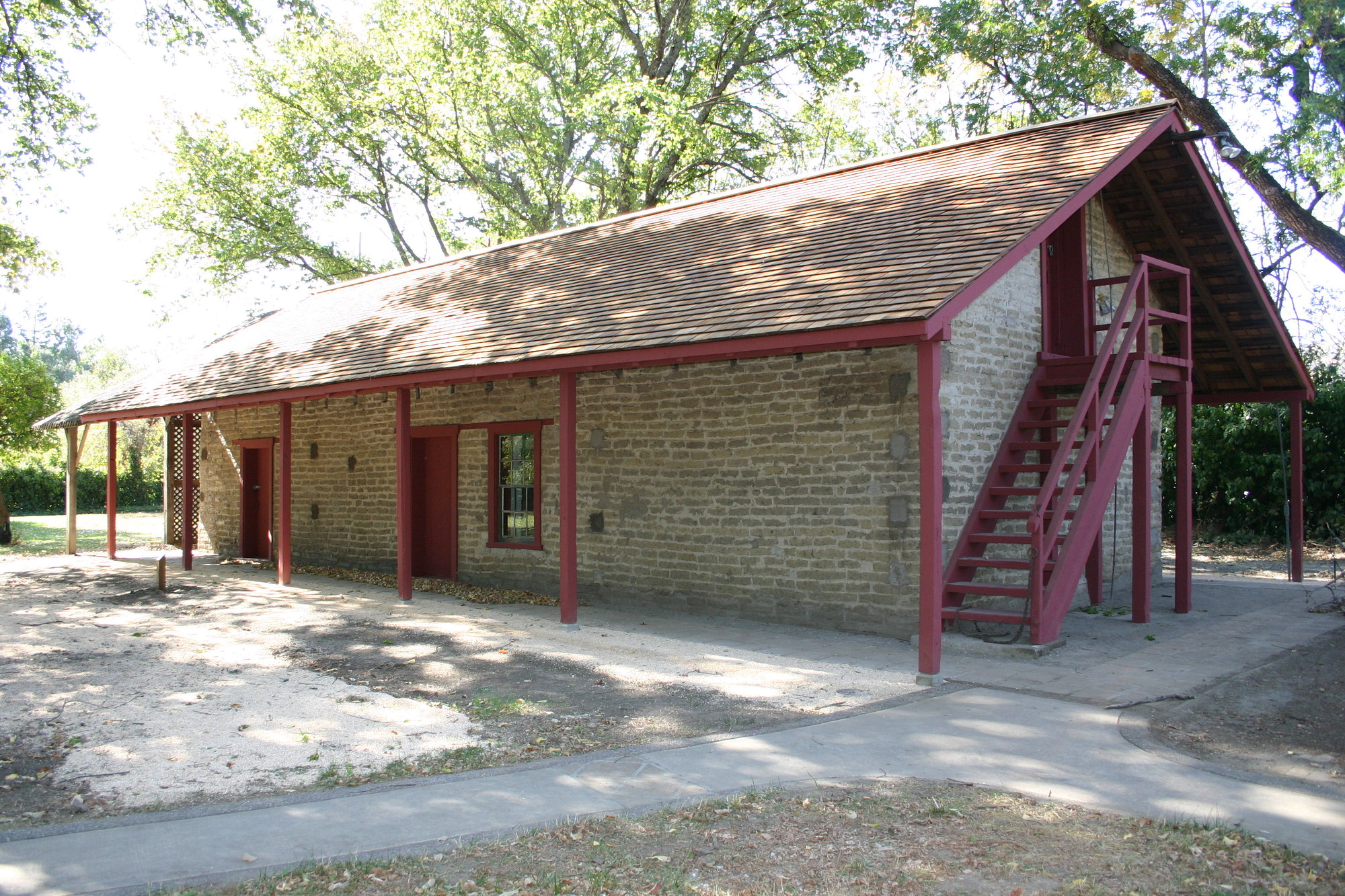

- Location within California Location within the United States
- Nearest city: Vacaville, California
- Coordinates: 38°20′14″N 122°0′51″W
- Area: 1.5 acres (0.61 ha)
- Built: 1842
- Architect: Juan Felipe Peña
- NRHP reference No.: 72000261
- CHISL No.: 534

Significant dates
- Added to NRHP: January 7, 1972
- Designated CHISL: Peña Adobe

Peña Adobe (Vaca-Peña Adobe) is a historic building and park in Vacaville, Solano County, California, United States.

== History ==
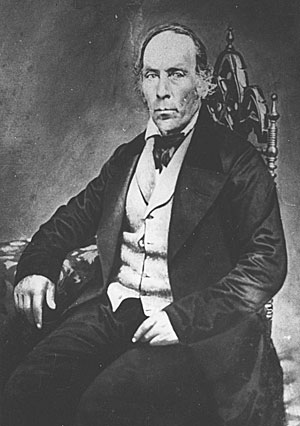
Juan Felipe Peña built the Peña Adobe in 1842 on Rancho Los Putos.

It was built in 1842 by the Californios and designed by Juan Felipe Peña on the Rancho Los Putos. It is situated on 1.5 acres (0.61 ha).

The Peña Adobe is part of the city's Peña Adobe Park, which includes the Mowers-Goheen Museum, the Willis Linn Jepson Memorial Garden, Indian Council Ground and picnic and recreation facilities. The Peña Adobe Historical Society provides educational and cultural services.

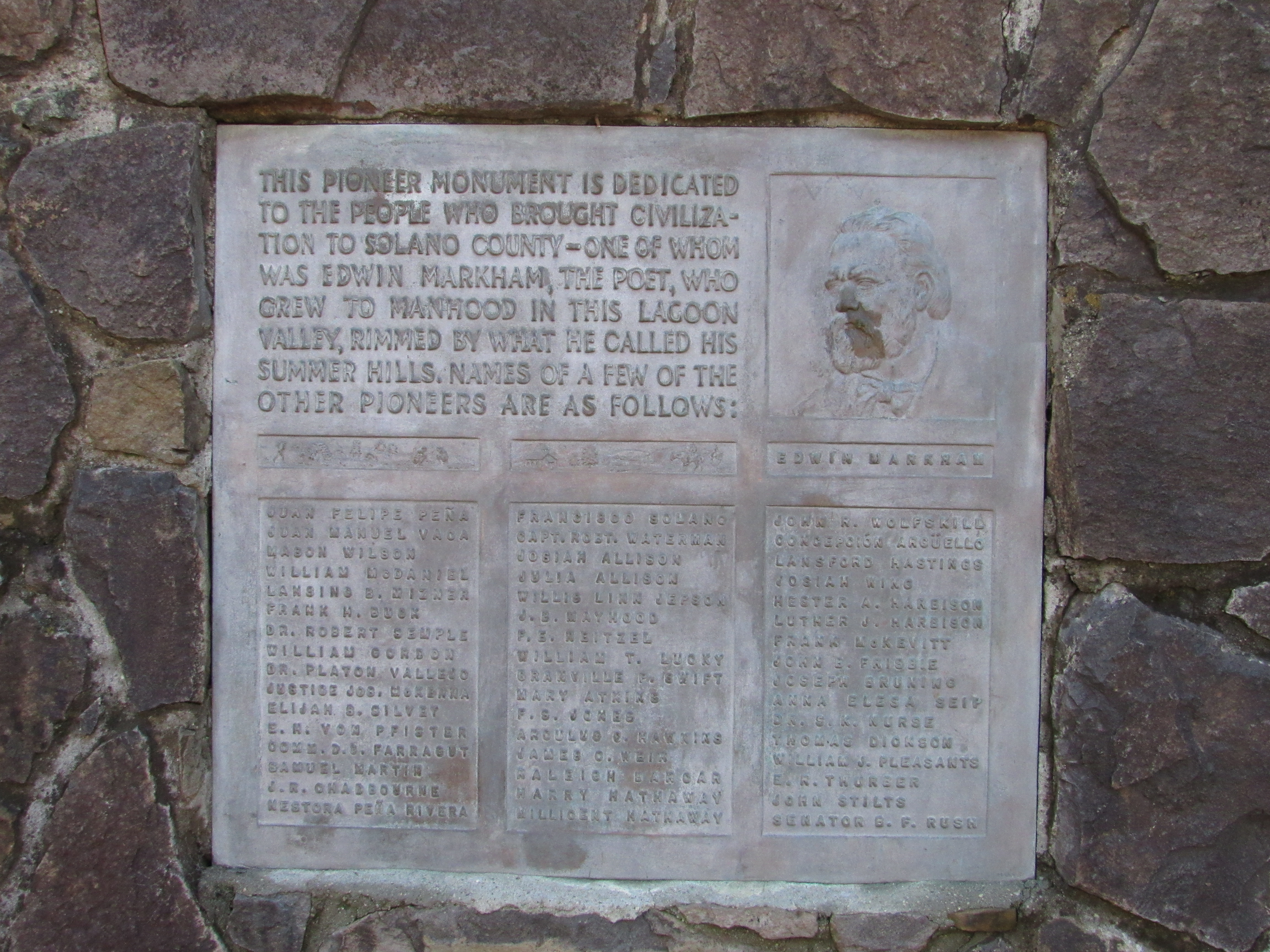
The Pioneer Monument at Pena Adobe Park

== See also ==
- California Historical Landmarks in Solano County
- National Register of Historic Places listings in Solano County, California
