= Vacaville, California =

City in California, United States

- City
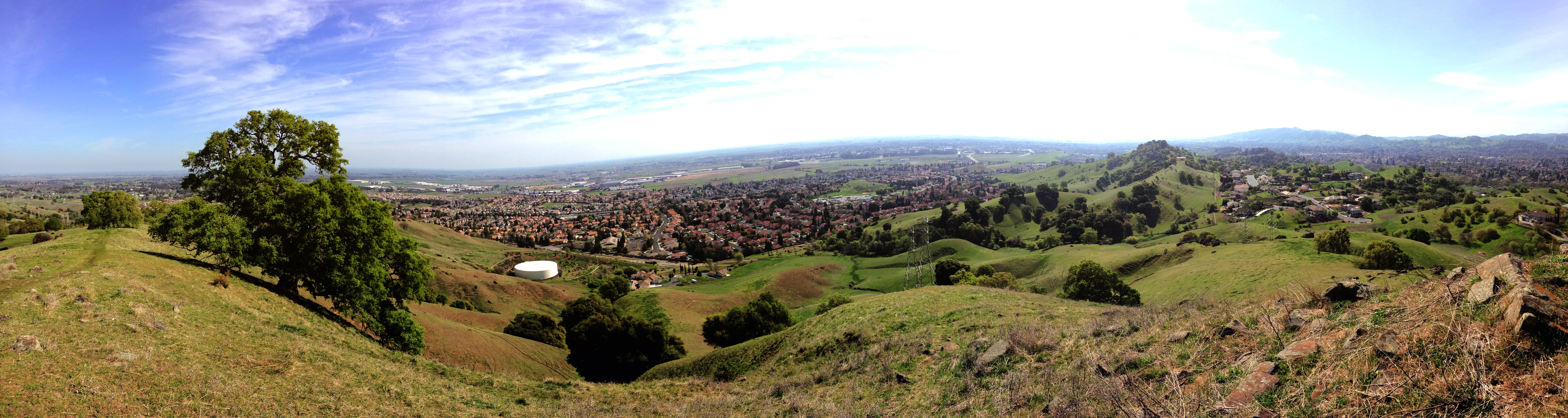

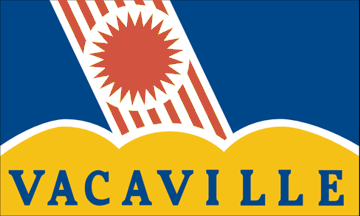
- Flag Seal Logo
- Interactive map of Vacaville, California
- Location in California Location in the United States
- Coordinates: 38°21′14″N 121°58′22″W
- Country: United States
- State: California
- County: Solano
- Incorporated: August 9, 1892
- Named for: Juan Manuel Cabeza Vaca

Government
  - City Council: Mayor John Carli; Vice-Mayor Sarah Chapman (District 4); Roy Stockton (District 1); Gregory Ritchie II (District 2); Michael Silva (District 3); Sarah Chapman (District 4); Ted Fremouw (District 5); Jeanette Wylie (District 6)
  - State Senator: Christopher Cabaldon (D)
  - Assemblymember: Lori Wilson (D)
  - U.S. Rep.: Mike Thompson (D); John Garamendi (D)

Area
  - Total: 30.10 sq mi (77.96 km^{2})
  - Land: 29.87 sq mi (77.36 km^{2})
  - Water: 0.23 sq mi (0.60 km^{2}) 0.77%
- Elevation: 174 ft (53 m)
- Highest elevation: 300 ft (91 m)
- Lowest elevation: 90 ft (27 m)

Population (2020)
  - Total: 102,386
  - Rank: 69th in California; 314th in the United States
  - Density: 3,428/sq mi (1,323.5/km^{2})
- Time zone: UTC−8 (Pacific)
  - Summer (DST): UTC−7 (PDT)
- ZIP Codes: 95687, 95688, 95696
- Area code: 707, 369
- FIPS code: 06-81554
- GNIS feature IDs: 277624, 2412139
- Website: Official website

Vacaville is a city in Solano County, California, United States. It is located 35 miles (56 km) from Sacramento and 55 miles (89 km) from San Francisco, on the edge of the Sacramento Valley in Northern California. The city was founded in 1851 and is named after Juan Manuel Vaca.

As of the 2020 census, Vacaville had a population of 102,386, making it the third-largest city in Solano County.

== History ==
Prior to European contact, the indigenous Patwin tribe lived in the area with the Ululato tribelet, establishing a chiefdom around the Ululato village in what is now downtown Vacaville along the Ulatis Creek.

The early settler pioneers of the land were Juan Manuel Cabeza Vaca and Juan Felipe Peña, who were awarded a 44,000-acre (18,000 ha) Mexican land grant in 1842. The same year, Vaca and Peña's families settled in the area of Lagoon Valley. Peña's Adobe home is the oldest standing building, built in 1842, now at Peña Adobe Park.

Discussions for the sale of a portion of land to William McDaniel began in August 1850. A written agreement was signed on December 13, 1851, forming a township, nine square miles of land were deeded to William McDaniel for $3,000, and the original city plans were laid out from that. In the agreement, McDaniel's would name the new town after Juan Manuel Cabeza Vaca.

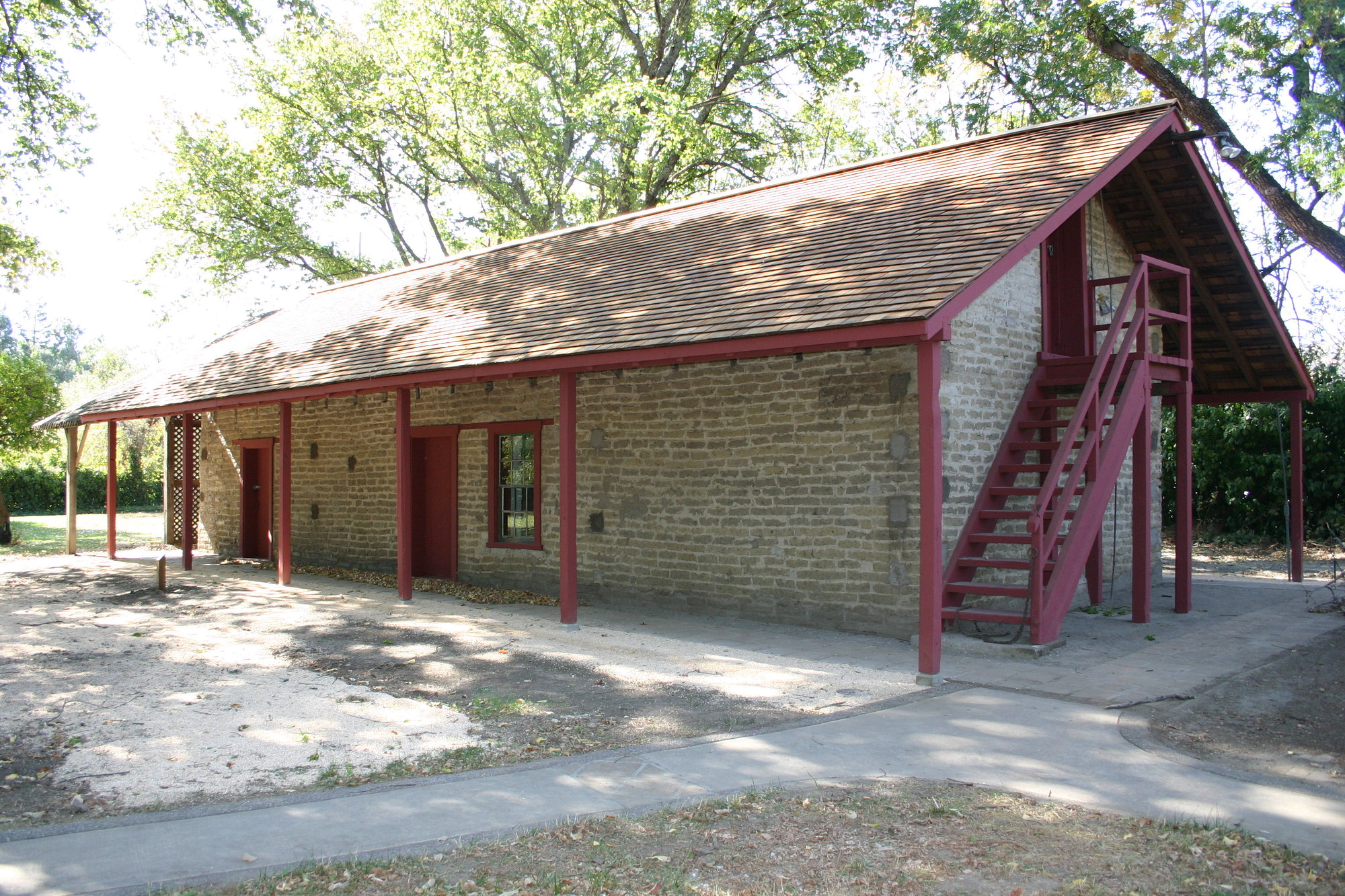
Peña Adobe (1842), the oldest building in Vacaville, at Peña Adobe Park

In 1880, Leonard Buck created the California Fruit Shipping Association, and the L.W. and F.H. Buck Company, an early company auctioning fruit in the state, and Vacaville was soon home to many large produce companies and local farms, which flourished due to the Vaca Valley's rich soil. Because of Vacaville's flourishing agricultural industry, as well as an increasing number of immigrants coming into the United States, Vacaville had a large Japanese and Chinese population. While their professions varied, many of these Japanese and Chinese worked for the fruit companies in Vacaville.

It officially became a city in 1892.

In 1885, the first grade school built was Ulatis School. In 1898, the town's first high school was built, Vacaville Union High School.

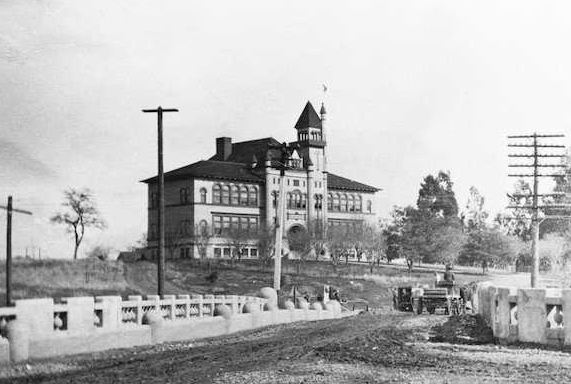
Vacaville High School in 1912

In 1968, the Vacaville Heritage Council was established.

In August 2020, parts of Vacaville were evacuated due to the Hennessey Fire, which resulted in the burning of over 315,000 acres (127,476 ha) in five counties, including in Vacaville, where farms and homes were destroyed.

On August 29, 2022, a truck transporting tomatoes crashed on Interstate 80 in Vacaville, injuring four, splattering over 150,000 of the tomatoes onto the eastbound section of the freeway, and significantly delaying eastbound traffic for hours. The peculiarity of the freeway accident subsequently resulted in international news coverage.

== Geography ==
Vacaville is surrounded by the Vaca Mountains to the south and to the west, and the Sacramento Valley to the north and to the east.

A number of rare and endangered species occur in the Vacaville area. Endangered plants, which have historically occurred in the vernal pool areas in and around Vacaville include Legenre limosa, Plagiobothrys hystriculus, Downingia humilis, Contra Costa goldfields (Lasthenia conjugens), and showy Indian clover (Trifolium amoenum). The Trifolium amoenum can be found in Lagoon Valley Regional Park.

According to the United States Census Bureau, the city has a total area of 30.1 square miles (78 km^{2}), of which 0.77% is covered by water. Excluding the Putah South Canal and minor local creeks, the only significant body of water within the city is the 105-acre (0.42 km^{2}) Lagoon Valley Lake.

The unincorporated communities of Allendale and Elmira are generally considered to be part of "greater" Vacaville.

=== Climate ===
Vacaville has a typical Mediterranean climate (Köppen Csa) with hot, dry summers and cool, wet winters. Summer high temperatures routinely exceed 100 °F, as is typical for inland California. Autumns are warm in September and even early October, but quickly cool as the wet season approaches. Winters can be cool, and often foggy, but are mild, with fewer frosts than further inland California. Spring is pleasant, with fairly mild temperatures. The greater majority of precipitation falls in the autumn, winter, and spring, with little to no precipitation in summer. Much of Vacaville falls in growing zone 9b, allowing some tropical plants to be grown outdoors.

The wettest year was 1983 with 48.9 inches (1,240 mm) and the driest year was 2012 with 5.0 inches. The most precipitation in one month was 19.83 inches (504 mm) in January 1916. The most precipitation in 24 hours was 6.10 inches (155 mm) on February 27, 1940. Snowfall is rare in Vacaville, but light measurable amounts have occurred, including 2.2 inches (56 mm) in January 1907 and 2.0 inches (51 mm) in December 1988.

Climate data for Vacaville, California, 1991–2020 normals, extremes 1998–present
Month	Jan	Feb	Mar	Apr	May	Jun	Jul	Aug	Sep	Oct	Nov	Dec	Year
Record high °F (°C)	78 (26)	85 (29)	88 (31)	97 (36)	106 (41)	112 (44)	115 (46)	111 (44)	115 (46)	104 (40)	89 (32)	76 (24)	115 (46)
Mean maximum °F (°C)	69.5 (20.8)	74.7 (23.7)	80.1 (26.7)	89.4 (31.9)	96.6 (35.9)	105.7 (40.9)	107.4 (41.9)	105.9 (41.1)	103.6 (39.8)	91.9 (33.3)	81.0 (27.2)	68.6 (20.3)	109.2 (42.9)
Mean daily maximum °F (°C)	57.6 (14.2)	63.0 (17.2)	68.5 (20.3)	74.9 (23.8)	82.8 (28.2)	90.7 (32.6)	97.3 (36.3)	96.5 (35.8)	91.9 (33.3)	81.2 (27.3)	67.0 (19.4)	57.9 (14.4)	77.4 (25.2)
Daily mean °F (°C)	48.6 (9.2)	52.6 (11.4)	56.6 (13.7)	61.5 (16.4)	67.8 (19.9)	74.2 (23.4)	78.7 (25.9)	78.0 (25.6)	74.7 (23.7)	66.5 (19.2)	55.8 (13.2)	48.7 (9.3)	63.6 (17.6)
Mean daily minimum °F (°C)	39.6 (4.2)	42.2 (5.7)	44.8 (7.1)	48.0 (8.9)	52.9 (11.6)	57.7 (14.3)	60.2 (15.7)	59.5 (15.3)	57.5 (14.2)	51.8 (11.0)	44.5 (6.9)	39.5 (4.2)	49.9 (9.9)
Mean minimum °F (°C)	27.3 (−2.6)	30.9 (−0.6)	34.3 (1.3)	37.5 (3.1)	44.2 (6.8)	49.1 (9.5)	52.9 (11.6)	52.7 (11.5)	47.0 (8.3)	40.9 (4.9)	31.4 (−0.3)	26.9 (−2.8)	24.7 (−4.1)
Record low °F (°C)	18 (−8)	24 (−4)	29 (−2)	32 (0)	34 (1)	43 (6)	49 (9)	48 (9)	41 (5)	33 (1)	25 (−4)	17 (−8)	17 (−8)
Average precipitation inches (mm)	5.55 (141)	5.14 (131)	3.37 (86)	1.23 (31)	0.78 (20)	0.22 (5.6)	0.00 (0.00)	0.06 (1.5)	0.13 (3.3)	1.01 (26)	2.44 (62)	5.67 (144)	25.60 (650)
Average precipitation days (≥ 0.01 in)	12.0	11.0	8.4	5.0	3.7	1.1	0.1	0.2	0.5	2.6	6.5	10.5	61.6
Source 1: NOAA
Source 2: National Weather Service (mean maxima/minima 2006–2020)

== Demographics ==
Historical population
Census	Pop.	Note	%±
1870	343		—
1880	361		5.2%
1890	725		100.8%
1900	1,220		68.3%
1910	1,177		−3.5%
1920	1,254		6.5%
1930	1,556		24.1%
1940	1,614		3.7%
1950	3,169		96.3%
1960	10,898		243.9%
1970	21,690		99.0%
1980	43,367		99.9%
1990	71,479		64.8%
2000	88,625		24.0%
2010	92,428		4.3%
2020	102,386		10.8%
U.S. Decennial Census; 1860–1870 1880-1890; 1900 1910 1920; 1930 1940 1950; 1960 1970 1980; 1990 2000 2010; 2020 U.S. Census

Vacaville, California – Racial and ethnic composition Note: the US Census treats Hispanic/Latino as an ethnic category. This table excludes Latinos from the racial categories and assigns them to a separate category. Hispanics/Latinos may be of any race.
Race / Ethnicity (NH = Non-Hispanic)	Pop 2000	Pop 2010	Pop 2020	% 2000	% 2010	% 2020
White alone (NH)	56,031	50,811	47,338	63.22%	54.97%	46.23%
Black or African American alone (NH)	8,691	9,187	9,386	9.81%	9.94%	9.17%
Native American or Alaska Native alone (NH)	608	510	395	0.69%	0.55%	0.39%
Asian alone (NH)	3,580	5,378	8,800	4.04%	5.82%	8.59%
Pacific Islander alone (NH)	360	436	663	0.41%	0.47%	0.65%
Other Race alone (NH)	169	765	665	0.19%	0.83%	0.65%
Mixed race or Multiracial (NH)	3,339	4,220	7,737	3.77%	4.57%	7.56%
Hispanic or Latino (any race)	15,847	21,121	27,402	17.88%	22.85%	26.76%
Total	88,625	92,428	102,386	100.00%	100.00%	100.00%

=== 2020 ===
The 2020 United States census reported that Vacaville had a population of 102,386. The population density was 3,427.7 inhabitants per square mile (1,323.4/km^{2}). The racial makeup was 51.8% White, 9.6% African American, 1.1% Native American, 9.0% Asian, 0.8% Pacific Islander, 11.9% from other races, and 16.0% from two or more races. Hispanic or Latino of any race were 26.8% of the population.

The census reported that 93.2% of the population lived in households, 0.2% lived in non-institutionalized group quarters, and 6.6% were institutionalized.

There were 34,932 households, out of which 34.2% included children under the age of 18, 52.0% were married-couple households, 6.7% were cohabiting couple households, 25.8% had a female householder with no partner present, and 15.5% had a male householder with no partner present. 22.0% of households were one person, and 10.2% were one person aged 65 or older. The average household size was 2.73. There were 24,988 families (71.5% of all households).

The age distribution was 21.6% under the age of 18, 8.5% aged 18 to 24, 28.7% aged 25 to 44, 25.9% aged 45 to 64, and 15.3% who were 65 years of age or older. The median age was 38.4 years. For every 100 females, there were 107.8 males.

There were 36,012 housing units at an average density of 1,205.6 units per square mile (465.5 units/km^{2}), of which 34,932 (97.0%) were occupied. Of these, 64.3% were owner-occupied, and 35.7% were occupied by renters.

=== 2010 ===
The 2010 United States census reported that Vacaville had a population of 92,428. The population density was 3,233.5 inhabitants per square mile (1,248.5/km^{2}). The racial makeup of Vacaville was 66.3% White, 10.3% African American, 0.9% Native American, 6.1% Asian (3.3% Filipino, 0.7% Chinese, 0.6% Indian, 0.5% Japanese, 0.3% Vietnamese, 0.3% Korean), 0.6% Pacific Islander, 8.8% from other races, and 7.0% from two or more races. Hispanics or Latinos of any race were 22.9% of the population (17.0% of Mexican, 0.9% Puerto Rican, 0.5% Salvadoran, 0.3% Nicaraguan, 0.2% Guatemalan, and 0.2% Peruvian descent).

The census reported that 91.3% of the population lived in households and 8.6% were institutionalized.

Of the 31,092 households, 37.8% had children under 18 living in them, 52.6% were opposite-sex married couples living together, 13.1% had a female householder with no husband present, 5.4% had a male householder with no wife present, 6.1% were unmarried opposite-sex partnerships, and 0.7% were same-sex married couples or partnerships; 7,053 households (22.7%) were made up of individuals, and 2,689 (8.6%) had someone living alone who was 65 or older. The average household size was 2.71. The city had 22,101 families (71.1% of all households); the average family size was 3.19.

The age distribution was 23.3% under 18, 9.7% from 18 to 24, 28.4% from 25 to 44, 28.1% from 45 to 64, and 10.5% who were 65 or older. The median age was 37.2 years. For every 100 females, there were 112.5 males. For every 100 females 18 and over, there were 115.1 males.

The 32,814 housing units had an average density of 1,148.0 units per square mile (443.2 units/km^{2}), of which 63.4% were owner-occupied and 36.6% were occupied by renters. The homeowner vacancy rate was 2.1%; the rental vacancy rate was 6.8%. About 59.0% of the population lived in owner-occupied housing units and 32.3% lived in rental housing units.

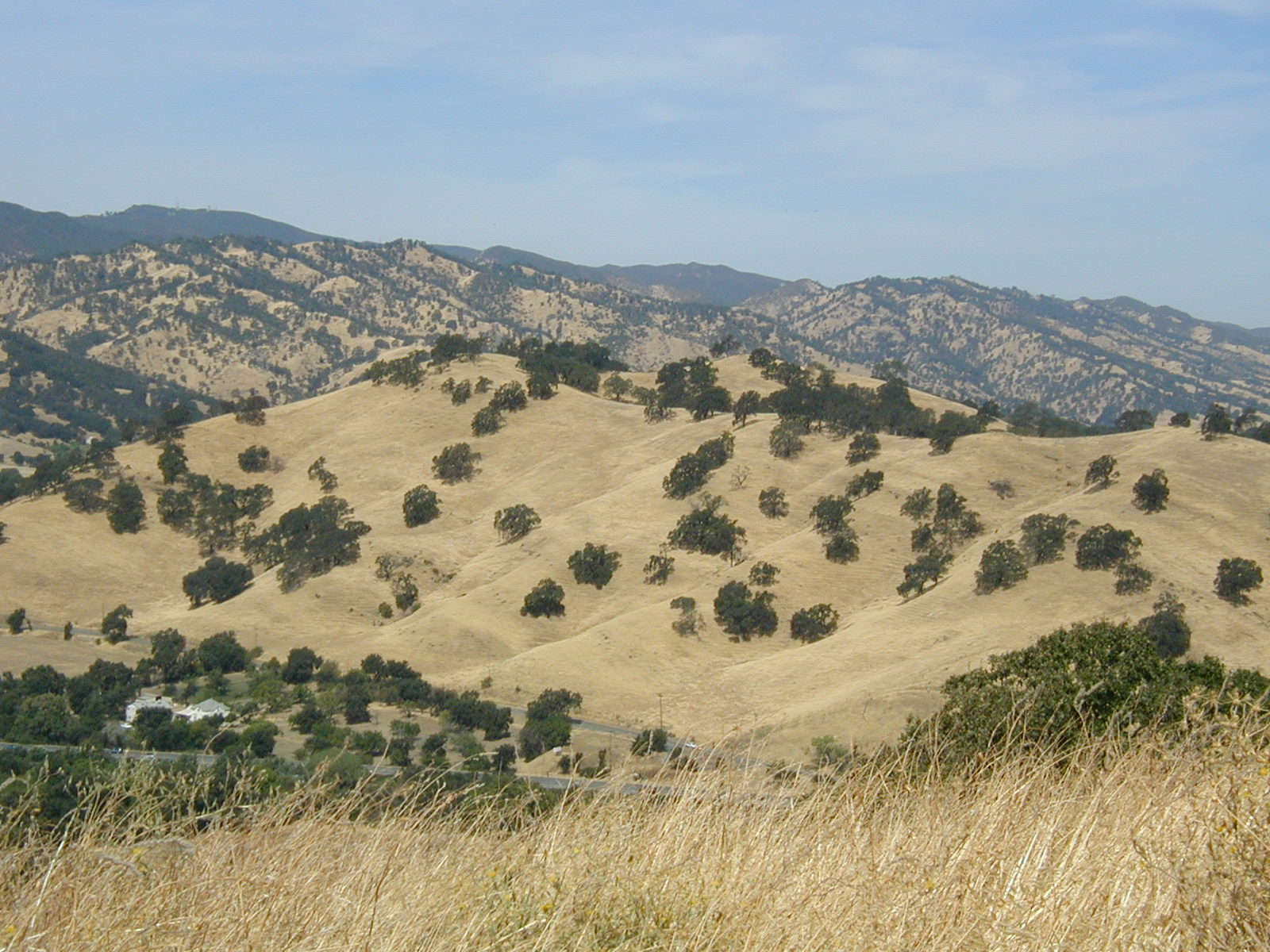
Vacaville Hills during summer

=== Personal income ===
According to the city of Vacaville, in 2019/2020, median household income was $82,513, which was 39% above the national average and 19% higher than the state average.

In 2007, the median income for a family was $63,950. Also in 2007, males had a median income of $43,527 versus $31,748 for females and per capita income for the city was $21,557. About 6.1% of the population and 4.3% of families lived below the poverty line. Of the total population, 7.4% of those under 18 and 4.8% of those 65 and older lived below the poverty line.

== Economy ==
=== Industry ===
Biotechnology/pharmaceutical facilities are operated by Lonza (formerly Genentech), ALZA Corporation, Kaiser Permanente, and Novartis International AG. On May 14, 2014, ICON Aircraft announced they would consolidate all company functions in a new 140,000-square-foot facility in Vacaville. Two state prisons are located in Vacaville: California State Prison, Solano and California Medical Facility. The latter houses inmates undergoing medical treatments. Johnson and Johnson closed the former Alza drug manufacturing plant in 2022.

=== Top employers ===
According to the city's 2021 Comprehensive Annual Financial Report, the top employers in Vacaville (excluding government agencies) are:

#	Employer	# of Employees
1	Kaiser Permanente	1,179
2	Amazon	1,083
3	Genentech	766
4	Blue Mountain Construction Services, Inc.	400
5	Mariani Packing Co., Inc.	350
6	Simonton Windows	320
7	M&G Duravent, Inc.	302
8	Costco	273
9	Alza (closed 2022)	250
10	Walmart	250

Public agencies also constitute major employers; however, the city does not include them in its financial reports because they do not collect employee information through the business license renewal process. Major public employers in Vacaville include the California State Department of Corrections, Vacaville Unified School District, the State Compensation Insurance Fund, and the City of Vacaville.

== Arts and culture ==
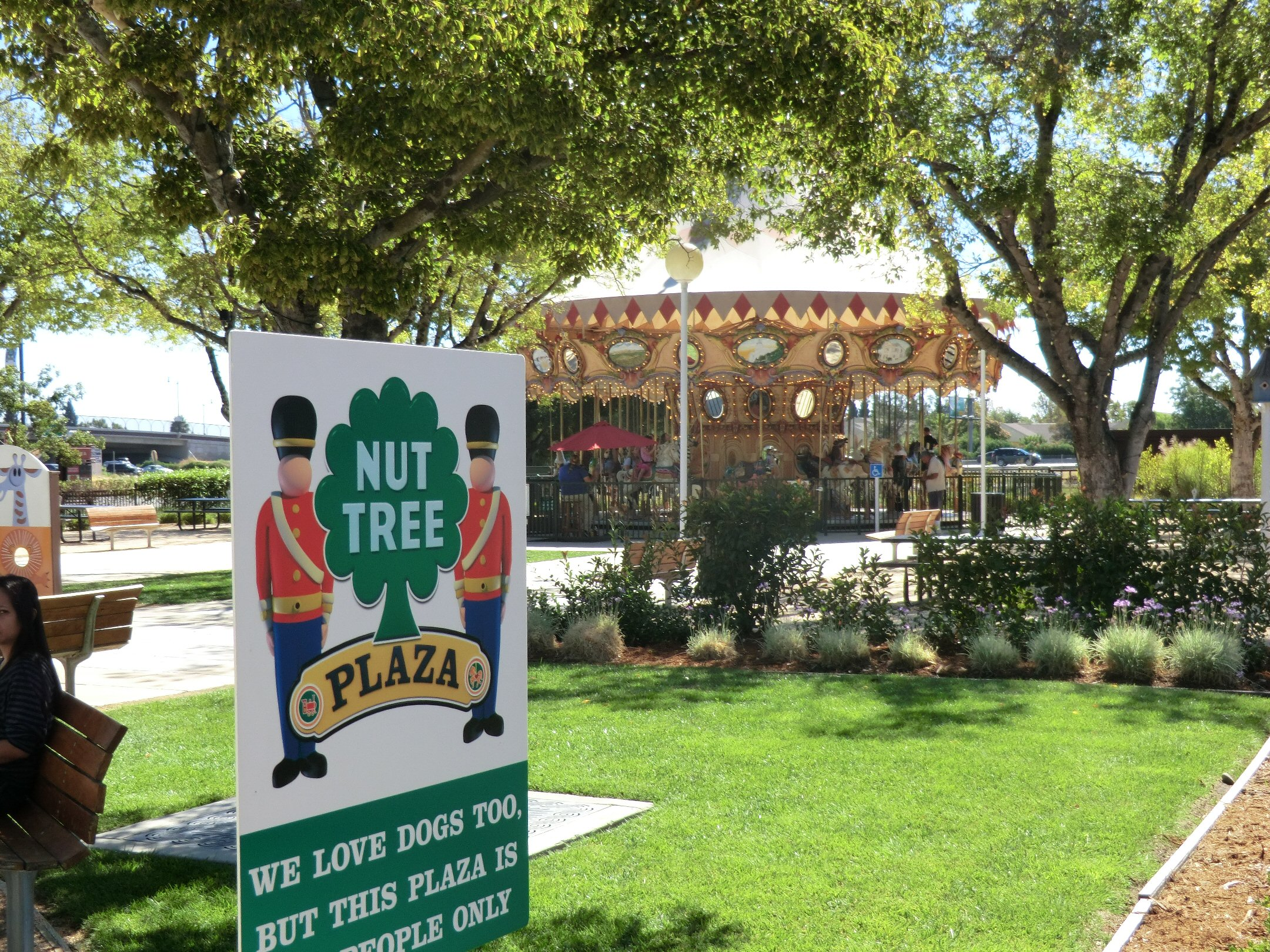
Nut Tree Plaza in Vacaville

Between 1992 and 1995, local artist Guillermo Wagner Granizo installed 20 outdoor ceramic-tile murals, set into three freestanding walls near City Hall, entitled, "Vacaville Centennial". The murals depict various aspects of the history of the city of Vacaville, including the early pioneers Juan Manuel Vaca, Juan Felipe Peña, and William McDaniel, the early fruit industry, the first schools, Peña Adobe Park, the Nut Tree (a 1920s roadside fruit and nut stand), various parades, the annual tree lighting ceremony, "Hamburger Hill", and the factory outlet stores, among others.

The city includes several historic buildings and places, including Peña Adobe, Will H. Buck House, Pleasants Ranch, and Vacaville Town Hall.

The Vacaville Cultural Center, located at the southeast corner of Allison Drive and Ulatis Drive, houses a regional library, the Vacaville Performing Arts Theatre, an outdoor garden, and rentable event space.

The city's libraries are operated by Solano County Library. The Vacaville Town Square Library is located within downtown, north of Main Street and east of Dobbins Road. The Vacaville Cultural Center Library is located within the Cultural Center facility at the southeast corner of Allison Drive and Ulatis Drive.

The Vacaville Museum, located on Buck Avenue, provides rotating exhibits throughout the year focusing on the history and culture of Solano County.

The Vacaville Art Gallery, located north of Andrews Park along East Monte Vista Avenue, provides exhibitions for local artists and community members.

=== Tourism ===
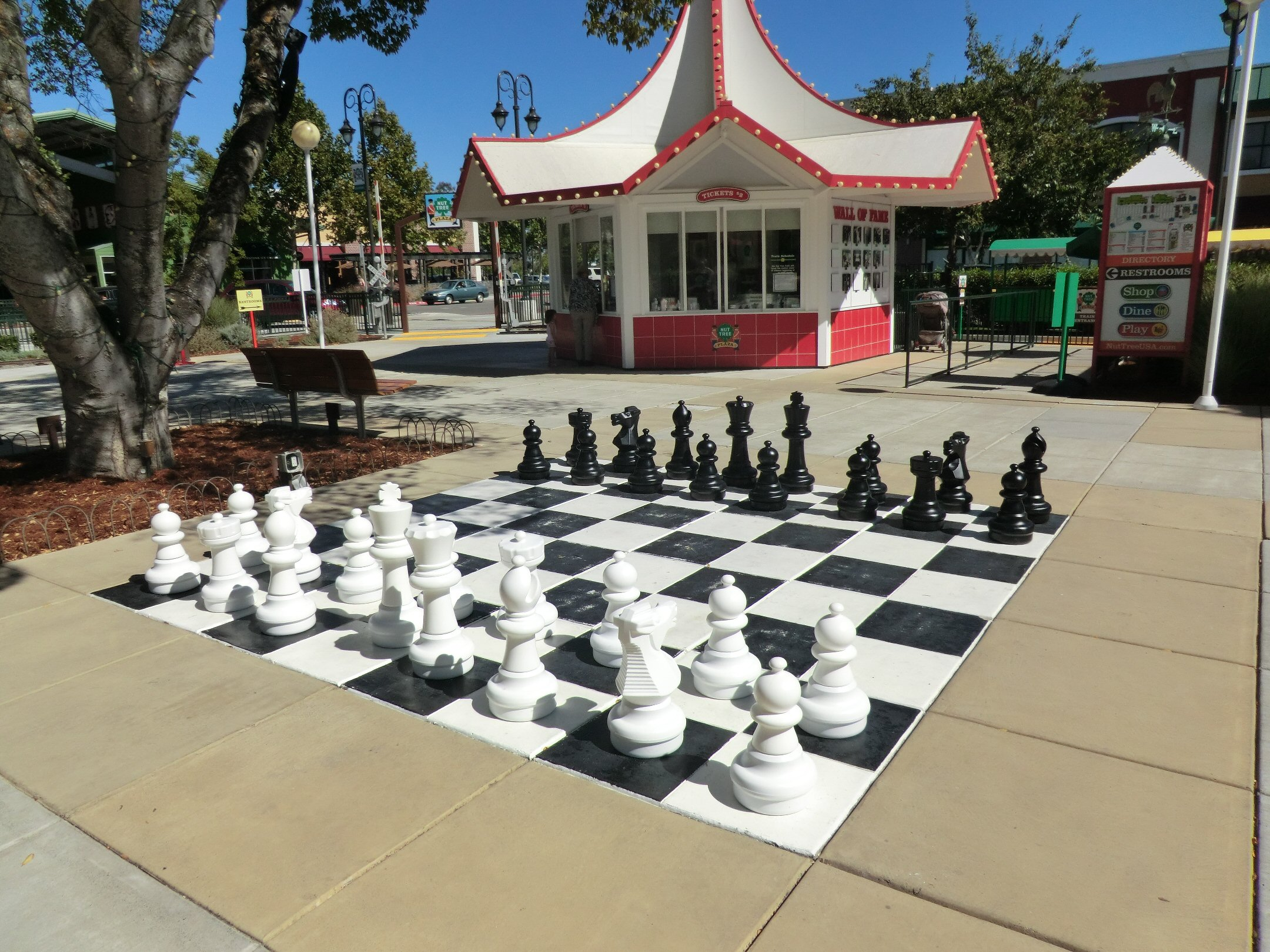
Nut Tree chessboard

The city holds an annual Vacaville Fiesta Days celebration downtown, including a parade that features the public-school marching bands, gymnasts, and an electric car showcase, among other things. Other sites for tourists include the Vacaville Premium Outlets and the Nut Tree, which is home to a train for children, a carousel, and a life-size chessboard, as well as numerous stores and dining establishments. Every Friday during the summer, the city holds the CreekWalk Concert Series in downtown Vacaville. Every December, the city holds a Festival of Trees in the ice skating rink and the Tree Lighting Ceremony, in which residents gather downtown to see a 50-foot (15 m) tree illuminate and enjoy festive music played by the Jepson Band, hot chocolate, and horse-drawn carriage rides. The Jimmy Doolittle Center at the Nut Tree Airport displays aircraft from as early as 1912 and is home to the Jimmy Doolittle Shell Lockheed Vega. Displays also include personal items of General Doolittle and items related to the Doolittle Raid of 1942.

== Parks and recreation ==
Regional and community parks include:

- Centennial Park, a 265-acre community park featuring baseball fields, tennis courts, soccer fields, and trails.
- Graham Aquatic Center.
- Lagoon Valley Park, a 306-acre regional park located within Lagoon Valley. The park is centered around a 100-acre lagoon, and features disc golf, trails, archery, and recreational sites. The park also houses the Peña Adobe Historical Area, which includes the historic Peña Adobe home and the Mowers-Goheen Museum.

== Government ==
Vacaville is governed by a seven-member City Council with six elected by district, and one mayor elected at large. Each serves a four-year term. Current alignment is Presidential Election: Districts 1, 3, 5. Gubernatorial Election: Mayor and Districts 2, 4, 6. The mayor is John Carli (elected 2022).

Vacaville is represented by California Assembly District 11 – Lori Wilson, California State Senate District 3 – Bill Dodd, and primarily by Congressional District 4 – Mike Thompson, however, a small portion in the east and southeast portion of the city is represented by Congressional District 8 – John Garamendi.

As of September 2022, there were 58,240 registered voters in Vacaville; of these, 22,198 (38.1%) are Democrats, 17,873 (30.7%) are Republicans, and 12,959 (22.3%) stated no party preference.

== Education ==
Two public school districts include portions of Vacaville: Vacaville Unified School District in the majority of the city limits, and Travis Unified School District in a southern portion. Some blocks of the city limits are in the Dixon Unified School District. The city is also served by a community college district, private schools and colleges.

=== Vacaville Unified School District ===
The Vacaville Unified School District (VUSD) includes the following campuses:

==== High schools ====
- Buckingham Collegiate Charter Academy
- Ernest Kimme Academy for Independent Learners (K–12)
- Ernest Kimme Work Readiness and Alternative Pathway (grades 7–12)
- Vacaville High School
- Will C. Wood High School

==== Middle schools ====
- Ernest Kimme Academy for Independent Learners (K–12)
- Kairos Public Schools Vacaville Academy (Charter School)
- Sierra Vista K–8
- Vaca Peña Middle School
- Willis Jepson Middle School

==== Elementary schools ====
- Ace Program
- Alamo Elementary School
- Browns Valley Elementary School
- Cooper Elementary School
- Edwin Markham Elementary School
- Ernest Kimme Academy for Independent Learners (K–12)
- Eugene Padan Elementary School
- Fairmont Charter Elementary School
- Hemlock Elementary School
- Jean Callison Elementary
- Kairos Public Schools Vacaville Academy (K–8)
- Orchard Elementary
- Sierra Vista (K–8)

==== Alternate schools and programs ====
- Ernest Kimme Charter Academy for Independent Learning
- Muzetta Thrower Adult Education Center

=== Travis Unified School District ===
The Travis Unified School District (TUSD), which serves Travis Air Force Base (TAFB) and parts of Fairfield and Vacaville, includes the following campuses:

- Cambridge Elementary School
- Foxboro Elementary School
- Center Elementary School (Fairfield)
- Scandia Elementary School (TAFB)
- Travis Elementary School (TAFB)

Its campuses serving Vacaville secondary students are:

- Golden West Middle School (Fairfield)
- Vanden High School (Fairfield)

=== Private schools ===
Private institutions with campuses in Vacaville are:

- Bethany Lutheran Preschool and Elementary School
- Centurion Christian Classical School
- Notre Dame Parochial School (Catholic private school K–8)
- Vacaville Adventist (Seventh-day Adventist)
- Vacaville Christian Schools (preschool–12)
- The Academy of 21st Century Learning

=== Colleges and universities ===
Vacaville is within the Solano Community College District. The Vacaville campus, located along North Village Parkway, features a 70-seat lecture hall, classrooms, science and computer laboratories, and a multipurpose room for theater arts and physical education. As part of the college's Bachelor's of Biomanufacturing degree program, the campus also contains the Biotechnology and Science Building, which houses four biotech labs, two chemistry labs, two biology labs, and a wet and dry anatomy lab. Among others, it offers an associate degree in biotechnology, which could lead to employment with local industries.

== Media ==
Radio station KUIC is based in Vacaville.

The Vacaville Reporter is a local daily newspaper. The Daily Republic, based in Fairfield, also provides local news coverage on Vacaville.

Vacaville is primarily served by the Sacramento media market, and by extension, the San Jose—San Francisco—Oakland media market.

== Infrastructure ==
=== Transportation ===
Interstate 80 passes through Vacaville, connecting San Francisco to the southwest and Sacramento to the northeast. Interstate 505 branches off Interstate 80, connecting Vacaville to Winters before eventually reaching Interstate 5 to the north.

The Fairfield-Vacaville Hannigan station, located east of Peabody Road in neighboring Fairfield, serves Vacaville and Fairfield. The station opened in November 2017. The station is served by Capitol Corridor trains operated by Amtrak California.

The Vacaville Transportation Center, located along Allison Drive and adjacent to Interstate 80, is the main hub for commuters via bus as well as vanpools and park-and-ride to the Sacramento area and the San Francisco Bay Area. Vacaville City Coach provides local bus service. SolanoExpress, which is operated by SolTrans, provides intercity connections to Fairfield, Benicia, Davis, Walnut Creek BART, and Sacramento.

The Nut Tree Airport is located in Vacaville and is operated by the Solano County General Services Department.

=== Hospitals ===
The city includes two hospitals, NorthBay VacaValley Hospital, a 50-bed facility whose campus also includes the NorthBay Cancer Center and HealthSpring Fitness Center, and the Kaiser Permanente Vacaville Medical Center, a hospital and trauma center.

== Notable people ==
(B) denotes that the person was born in Vacaville.

- Arthur Adams (born 1963) – comic-book artist known for Longshot and Monkeyman and O'Brien
- Brothers Wayne and Trent Gardner – founders and members of American prog metal band Magellan
- Dennis Alexio (born 1959) – kickboxer, eight-time world champion (B)
- Chris Begley – member of the band Fight Fair
- Andy Bloom (born 1973) – Olympic shot putter, NCAA champion in shot put and discus
- Frank H. Buck – politician, fruit baron, developer of Beverly Hills, California (B)
- Jarrett Bush – NFL player, Green Bay Packers, Will C. Wood High School alumnus (B)
- Kyle DeVan – offensive guard for Indianapolis Colts
- Jermaine Dye – Major League Baseball player; 2005 World Series MVP with the Chicago White Sox
- Tony Gonsolin – Pitcher for the Los Angeles Dodgers (B)
- Xzavie Jackson – defensive end for Cincinnati Bengals
- Stefan Janoski – skateboarder
- Willis Linn Jepson – botanist and conservationist (B)
- Josh Kaddu – linebacker for the Miami Dolphins
- Bonnie McKee – pop singer and songwriter (B)
- Tawny Newsome – actress, comedienne, and musician; voices Beckett Mariner on Star Trek: Lower Decks (B)
- Vince Newsome – NFL player for Los Angeles Rams, Cleveland Browns, Baltimore Ravens; in 1983, became first Vacaville resident drafted into NFL
- Frank Parker – actor, played Grandpa Shawn Brady on Days of Our Lives
- Papa Roach – rock band
- Aaron Pauley – bassist and vocalist of rock band Of Mice & Men and Jamie's Elsewhere
- Michael Polenske – vintner
- A. Purves Pullen (a.k.a. Dr. Birdbath) – voice actor known for mimicking birds and animals, including bird sounds in the Disney film Snow White and the Seven Dwarfs
- Jacoby Shaddix – lead singer of rock band Papa Roach
- Casey Sheehan – awarded Bronze Star with Palm Fronds posthumously for actions in Iraq on April 4, 2004
- Cindy Sheehan – political activist
- Jessica Sierra – singer
- Robyn Stevens (born 1983) – race walker
- Carson Strong – football quarterback for the Michigan Panthers (B)
- Greg Tagert – baseball manager
- Mykal Walker – NFL linebacker for the Atlanta Falcons
- Thomas Williams – linebacker for USC Trojans and NFL
- Luzena Wilson – California Gold Rush entrepreneur and memoirist

== See also ==
- 1892 Vacaville–Winters earthquakes
- Nut Tree Airport
- Rancho Los Putos
