= William Wolfskill =

American cowboy and agronomist (1798–1866)

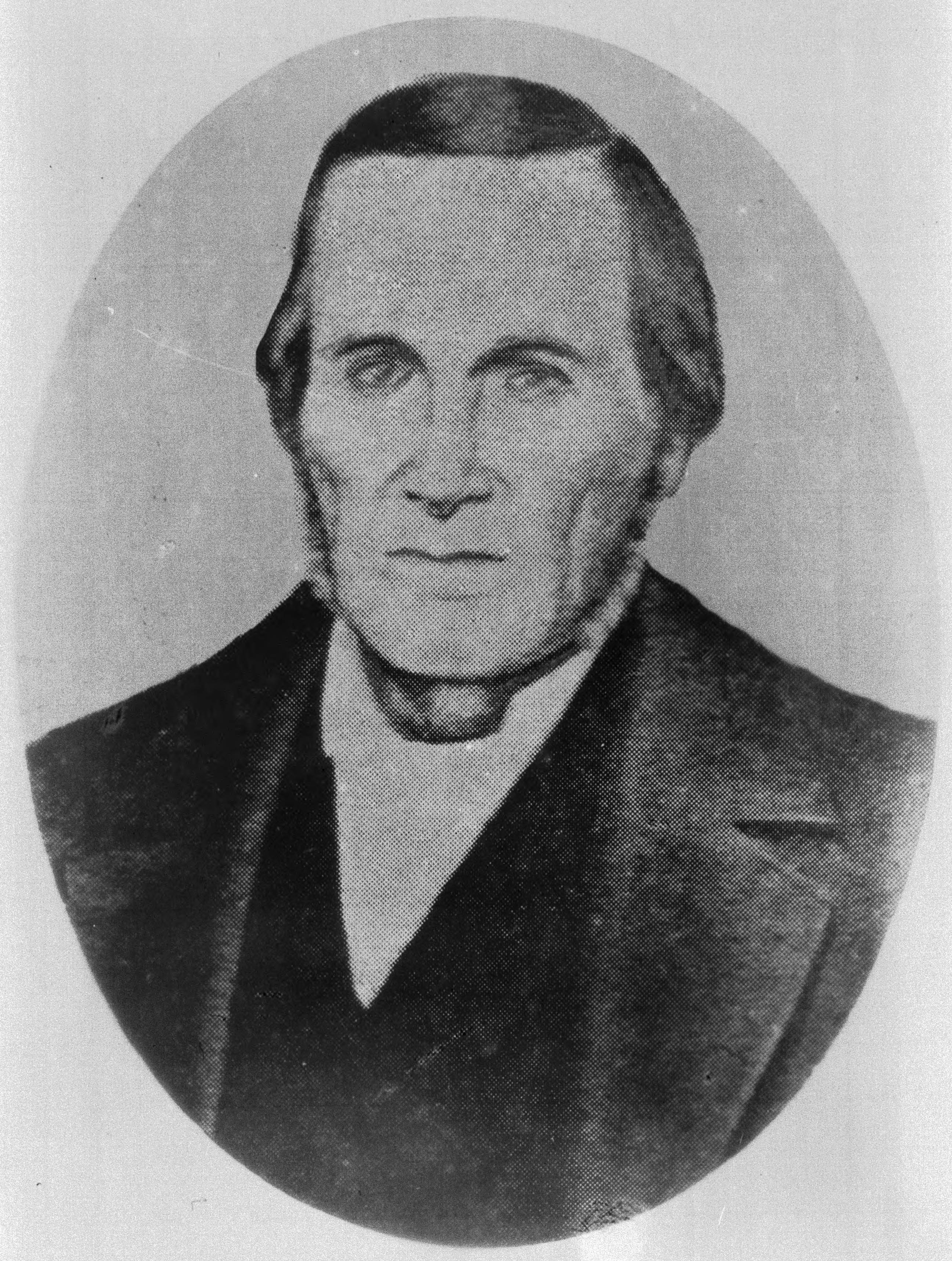
Portrait c. 1831

William Wolfskill (1798–1866) was an American-Mexican pioneer, cowboy, and agronomist in Los Angeles, California beginning in the 1830s. He had earned money for land in a decade as a fur trapper near Santa Fe, New Mexico, where he had become a Mexican citizen. This enabled him to own land in California.

Wolfskill was highly influential in the development of California's agricultural industry in the 19th century, expanding viticulture and becoming the largest wine producer in the region. One of the wealthiest men of his time in Southern California, he expanded his holdings, raising sheep and cultivating oranges, lemons, and other crops. In 1841, he planted an early commercial citrus orchard near what is now downtown Los Angeles, contributing to the development of California's citrus industry.

In 1842, Wolfskill received a Mexican land grant in the Sacramento Valley, near what is now Winters, California. His brother John Reid Wolfskill settled the property, which became known as Rancho Rio de los Putos or the Wolfskill Ranch, and established orchards and vineyards there. William transferred half the grant to John in 1849 and the remaining land by 1854. Three other Wolfskill brothers also migrated to California and worked with John in the north.

== History ==
Wolfskill was born in Madison County, Kentucky on March 20, 1798. His family followed Daniel Boone to Missouri. He moved to New Mexico in 1821, while the region was a province of Mexico called Santa Fe de Nuevo México. He spent ten years fur trapping in the New Mexico area, as the fur trade was highly lucrative and he could put together a stake for his future. In 1828 he became a naturalized Mexican citizen.

Wolfskill left Taos, New Mexico, in September 1830 with a party of mountain men that included George C. Yount. When they arrived in Southern California in early 1831 (using the trail Jedediah Smith had mapped across the Mojave Desert), Wolfskill and Yount went to the coast to hunt sea otter. Wolfskill eventually returned to Southern California while Yount decided to go north, and the two parted company. Yount settled in the Napa Valley.

In 1832, Wolfskill led the massacre of the village of Puhú by American and Mexican fur trappers.

As a naturalized citizen of Mexico, Wolfskill was allowed to own land and bought a parcel where downtown Los Angeles later developed. He began to cultivate grapevines for wine. He eventually planted 32,000 vines on a 48-acre vineyard. Initially, he planted mission vines, which had been introduced by the Spanish missionaries. He expanded his plantings to include other varietals later.

In May 1842 Wolfskill was awarded a large land grant in that area that developed as Winters, California in what is now Yolo County. His younger brother John joined him, and they named the property Rancho Rio de los Putos, after a nearby creek. The name was derived by Spanish colonists from Lake Miwok puṭa wuwwe, meaning "grassy creek."

The property was later known as the Wolfskill Ranch. John Wolfskill established orchards and vineyards. Three younger Wolfskill brothers, Milton, Mathus, and Satchal, also migrated to that region, settling and working with John. William transferred half the land grant to John in 1849 and the remainder by 1854.

In 1860, Wolfskill purchased Rancho Lomas de Santiago from Teodosio Yorba and his wife for $7,000, using the property primarily for livestock. In March 1866, he sold the rancho and his interest in Rancho Santiago de Santa Ana to a partnership comprising Llewellyn Bixby, Thomas and Benjamin Flint, and James Irvine. The sale concerned ranch land and property rights, for which Wolfskill received $7,000.

By his death in 1866 in Los Angeles, William Wolfskill was producing 50,000 gallons of wine a year. He was, by far, the greatest producer of table grapes in California during the Mexican era. He has been ranked by historians as one of the three most important men in the history of California viticulture. Wolfskill's neighbor, friend, and business rival in the tiny pueblo of Los Angeles, was French immigrant Jean-Louis Vignes.

For his time, Wolfskill was one of the wealthiest men in Southern California. He owned large tracts of land throughout the region, which he used for everything from running sheep to cultivating orange groves.

Wolfskill is credited with developing and building the first schooner in California.

John Bidwell, another early American pioneer in California, notes Wolfskill in his memoir as among European Americans he knew in early Mexican Los Angeles:

Los Angeles I first saw in March, 1845. It then had probably two hundred and fifty people [referring to non-Native Americans only], of whom I recall Don Abel Stearns, John Temple, Captain Alexander Bell, William Wolfskill, Lemuel Carpenter, David W. Alexander; also of Mexicans, Pio Pico (governor), Don Juan Bandini, and others.
