= Rancho Los Putos =

Mexican land grant in Solano County, California

Coordinates: 38.39°N 122°W

Rancho Los Putos, also called Rancho Lihuaytos, was a 44,384-acre (179.62 km^{2}) Mexican land grant in present-day Solano County, California given in 1843 by Governor Manuel Micheltorena to Juan Felipe Peña and Juan Manuel Vaca.

The Los Putos name comes from the nearby Putah Creek (formerly Rio Los Putos). The grant encompassed present day Vacaville, all of Lagoon Valley and stretched into modern-day Yolo County almost to Davis. It also reached into the Vaca Mountains.

== History ==
Juan Felipe Peña (died 1863) and Juan Manuel Vaca (1782–1856) came from New Mexico to California with the Workman-Rowland Party in 1841. Peña came with his wife, Isabella Gonsalves and their six children. Vaca's wife died in 1839, but he was accompanied by their eight children. Vaca married Estefano Martinez in 1845.

General Vallejo is credited with recommending the Lagoon Valley area to Vaca and Peña. The Los Putos grant of 10 square leagues was made in 1843 by Governor Micheltorena. The grant was originally called Rancho Lihuaytos - which was the name of Putah Creek at that time. The grant overlapped the Rancho Rio de los Putos grant of William Wolfskill, and in 1845, Governor Pio Pico made a correcting grant 10 square leagues.

With the cession of California to the United States following the Mexican-American War, the 1848 Treaty of Guadalupe Hidalgo provided that the land grants would be honored. As required by the Land Act of 1851, a claim for Rancho Los Putos was filed with the Public Land Commission in 1853, and the grant was patented to Juan Felipe Peña and Juan Manuel Vaca in 1858. A second claim was filed by Ralph Lee Kilbourn in 1853 for 1,500 acres, but was rejected by the Board.

The first sales of Rancho property began in 1849, when Vaca sold a half-league of land between Alamo Creek and Ulatis Creek to John Patton and Albert Lyon. In 1850 Peña sold a half-league to Jacob David Hoppe and Zimri Hollingsworth.

Then in 1850, came the history making sale, when Vaca sold one square league (about 9 square miles) of land to William McDaniel with the provision that one square mile (640 acres) would be used to create a township called Vacaville. Vaca received about half of subdivided lots in the town. McDaniel's partner was the Benicia attorney Lansing B. Mizner. In exchange for laying out the town and tending to the legal paperwork, Mizner received half of the land in the deal with Vaca. Vaca could not speak, read, write English, but Mizner, fluent in both Spanish and English, was the interpreter for the transaction. It might be noted that McDaniel was a federal land agent and it was against the laws of the land for him to be involved in purchasing land.

Peña was upset, and it was the cause of the major quarrel between Peña and Vaca. In response, Peña received two hundred lots in the town of Vacaville. Vaca was also upset about the McDaniel deal. He said he had believed he was signing over only one square mile. Vaca posted in the Benicia newspaper: “Caution. I hereby notify all persons not to purchase any lands from William McDaniel, which he claims to have purchased from me under a title which he obtained from me under false pretenses, and I shall institute suit against him to annul the title so fraudulently obtained by him. Manual Vaca”. McDaniel sued Vaca for libel and the loss of a land sale. The jury found Vaca guilty of libel, but the California Supreme Court overturned the decision, ruling that Vaca's newspaper warning was something that “every freeman and freeholder would be justified in making if the circumstances raised a strong presumption that the fraud had been attempted upon him to get possession of his estate”.

After Vaca and Peña argued over the William McDaniel land sale, Vaca sold his adobe to John Wesley Hill. Juan Manual Vaca died in 1856.

Peña died in 1863, leaving his land to his children and the adobe to his only daughter, Nestora Peña Rivera (who married Jesus Tapia Rivera), along with 1,000 acres (4.0 km^{2}). His wife Isabella stayed at the adobe until she died in 1884.

A survey correcting the boundaries of the William Wolfskill Rio de los Putos grant and the Vaca-Peña Rancho was made in 1858. Adjustments had to be made to the original boundary lines of the grant. The boundary lines were finally established as a twisted and elongated configuration.

The legal fees for the years 1853 through to the official United States patent in 1858, were paid in land. They turned large parcels of land to pay taxes. By 1855, the tax rolls show only 13,777 acres (55.8 km^{2}) of the original 44,384 acres (179.6 km^{2}) Vaca-Peña grant remaining in the original owners’ hands. By 1880 most of the land grant was sold.

== Historic sites of the Rancho ==
- Vaca-Peña Adobe. The Peña Adobe was erected in 1843. The Vaca adobe home was destroyed in the 1892 Vacaville–Winters earthquakes.

== See also ==
- Ranchos of California
- Los Putos
