= Vacaville High School =

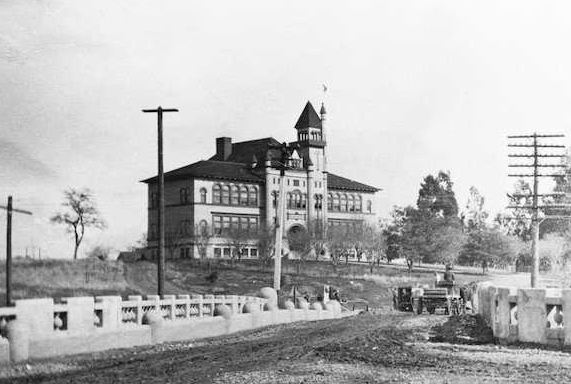
- Vacaville High School, 1912

Location
- 100 West Monte Vista Avenue; Vacaville, California 95688; United States; 38°21′35″N 121°59′54″W

Information
- Other name: Vacaville Union High School
- Type: Public high school
- Established: 1898; 128 years ago
- School district: Vacaville Unified School District
- Superintendent: Ed Santopadre
- Principal: Adam Wight
- Teaching staff: 91.34 (FTE) (2023–2024)
- Grades: 9-12
- Enrollment: 2,027 (2023–2024)
- Student to teacher ratio: 22.19 (2023–2024)
- Color
- Nickname: Bulldogs
- Website: vhs.vacavilleusd.org

Vacaville High School is an American public high school in the Vacaville Unified School District located in the city of Vacaville, California, serving the north side of the city and the far northern unincorporated communities of Allendale, Bucktown and Hartley.

== History ==
The original school building was completed in 1898 and was used until 1952, when a new building replaced it. Originally named Vacaville Union High School. In 2018, two fifteen-classroom mathematics and English buildings were opened.

== Notable alumni ==
- Jordan Brown, major league baseball outfielder
- Randy Dedini, professional soccer goalie and college head coach
- Kyle DeVan, played offensive guard for the Indianapolis Colts and other NFL teams
- Tony Gonsolin, Major League Baseball pitcher for the Los Angeles Dodgers, 2020 World Series Champion
- Bob Heise, former Major League Baseball player
- Stefan Janoski, skateboarder with signature Nike shoe
- Josh Kaddu, NFL linebacker
- Zack Nash, NFL linebacker
- Aaron Pauley, lead vocalist and bassist for the metalcore band Of Mice & Men
- Dave Sells, former Major League Baseball pitcher
- Jacoby Shaddix, leader of the band Papa Roach
- Robyn Stevens (born 1983), race walker
- Mykal Walker, NFL linebacker for the Atlanta Falcons.
- Thomas Williams, NFL linebacker and motivational speaker

== Notable staff ==
- Raymond C. Carrington, sculptor; math teacher at the school
- Jason Fisk, former professional football player; football coach at the school
