= Scandia, Solano County, California =

Scandia Elementary School

Location
- 100 Broadway Street; Travis A.F.B., California 94535; United States; 38°27′57″N 121°52′41″W

Information
- School district: Travis Unified School District
- Superintendent: Kate Wren Gavlak
- Principal: Mark Pennington
- Enrolment: 509 (2014)
- Colors: Purple and Dark Green
- Athletics conference: Solano County Athletics
- Nickname: Snakes
- Website: School website

Scandia is an area of Solano County, California, United States. It means “Little Norway,” and refers to the Scandinavian pioneers who settled the area southeast of present-day Fairfield. The name is commemorated by Scandia Elementary School on Travis Air Force Base.

== History ==
In 1852, three Norwegian seafarers – Carl H. Thompson and his brother Dan, and Steve Larsen – purchased a small sailboat in San Francisco and headed up the Sacramento River. Apparently their destination was the gold fields of the Mother Lode region; however, they missed the main channel of the river and found themselves in Montezuma Slough (see Suisun Marsh) which is located a few miles south of present-day Travis Air Force Base. They abandoned their boat there and walked inland to Calaveras County.

After two years of work, and finding little gold, the three Norwegians returned to Montezuma Slough, built a small house, and raised sheep and cattle. “Gradually other Scandinavians took up farming in the area, and ‘Little Norway’ [Scandia] became the accepted name of the area east and south of Denverton”. Today, the Western Railway Museum is located near Denverton, California (Highway 12 southeast of Travis AFB).

When construction began on the Army airfield that would become Travis AFB, and area was still referred to as Scandia as can be seen in an article in the Solano Republican. The first article on construction was on July 2, 1942, four days before bulldozers broke ground for the new airstrip. The following week, the Republican reported that “the great 1,600 acre area six miles east of Fairfield in the Scandia Section is today teaming with activity as men and machines move in to prepare the foundations for a great flying field”.

== Scandia Elementary School ==
Scandia Elementary School is located on Travis Air Force Base. The name of the school "was selected in commemoration of those gallant pioneers who envisioned this local site as a possible creation of the American dream".

The school was officially dedicated April 21, 1970, and was open for a short time at the end of that school year. Its first full school year was 1970-1971. The 6-acre (24,000 m^{2}) site originally housed first- through third-graders in 12 classrooms.

== Vanden High School ==
Vanden High School is located next to Travis AFB and was built to accommodate children from the base. It was named because the location of the school is in the same vicinity in which a town called Vanden was to be built. A Scandinavian family by the name of Vanden settled in this area in the mid-1880s. They started a store and made plans for the town and a railroad station. These plans never materialized, although a post office operated from 1897 to 1899.

The school board wished to pay tribute to this early pioneer family by selecting its name as one of historical importance for the high school.

The Class of 1965 was Vanden's first graduating class.

The school mascot is the Vikings, another reference to Scandinavian heritage.
