= Bradmoor Island =

Island in California

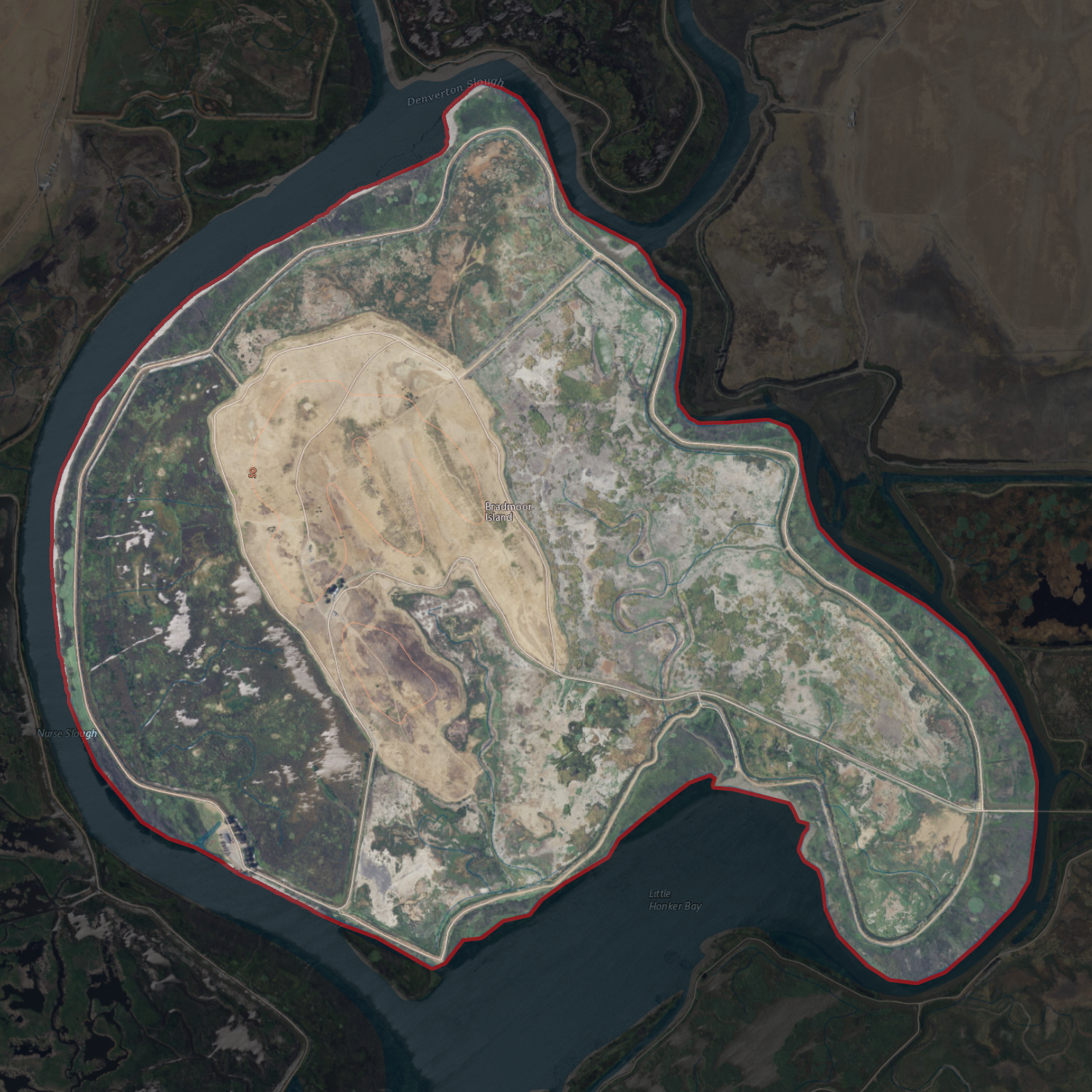
- USGS aerial imagery of Bradmoor Island

- Location within Sacramento-San Joaquin River Delta Location within California Location within the United States

Geography
- Location: Northern California
- Coordinates: 38°11′26″N 121°55′05″W
- Adjacent to: Sacramento–San Joaquin River Delta
- Highest elevation: 52 ft (15.8 m)

Administration
- United States
- State: California
- County: Solano

Bradmoor Island is an island in Suisun Bay, in Solano County, California, US. It is one of the locations in the region that has had its tidal wetlands restored as part of the EcoRestore project run by the California Department of Water Resources.

== Geography ==
The island located in the northeastern part of the Suisun Marsh, to the south of Denverton, and is bordered by Nurse Slough to the west, Denverton Slough to the east and Little Honker Bay to the south. Most of the island is intertidal, with a tidal berm on the rim enclosing one of the largest upland hill habitats in the Suisun Marsh, serving as a home to plant life endemic to the region. The United States Geological Survey measured the islands elevation as 52 ft (16 m) in 1981.

The water temperatures off the island mostly stay between 64–75 °F (18–24 °C) throughout the year.

== History ==
The island was home to a NOAA tidal monitoring station between 2004 and 2006, and As of 2026 is home to a USGS water monitoring station.

In 2013, 2016 and 2017, the California Department of Water Resources purchased three duck clubs' plots of land on the island, about 750 acres (300 ha) in total, (Note: Sources conflict on whether it is 744 or 754 acres (301 or 305 ha).) endeavouring to restore tidal wetlands on the island, being to the benefit of the islands' habitat and the fishes in its surrounding waters while also opening up new navigational waterways for recreational use. The restoration, a part of the EcoRestore project, involved demolishing buildings and infrastructure on the island before breaking open five levees. The Bradmoor Island Restoration Project was completed in September 2022, with 490 acres (200 ha) of tidal wetland being restored.
