= Denverton =

Denverton may refer to:

- Denverton, California, near Scandia, Solano County, California, US
- Denverton, in the List of Intel CPU microarchitectures
