= Maine Prairie, California =

Unincorporated community in California, United States

Coordinates: 38°18′29″N 121°45′32″W

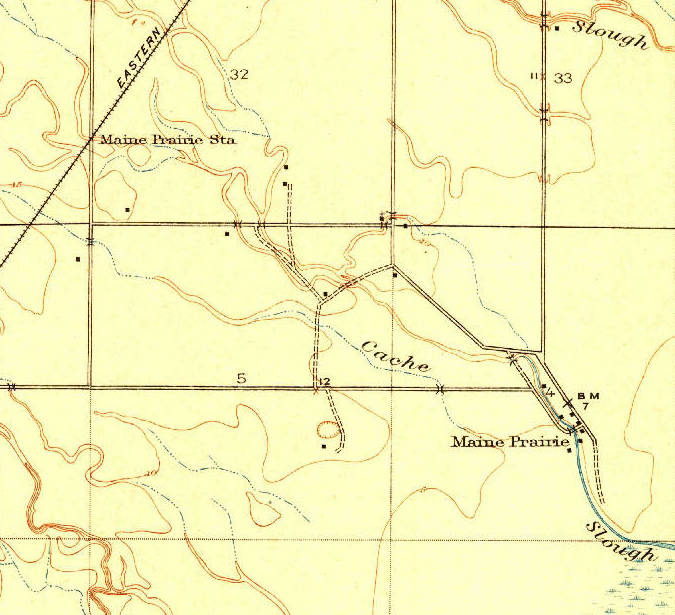
Community and station in 1916

Maine Prairie is an unincorporated community located in Solano County, California, United States, east of Elmira on the Maine Prairie Slough at latitude 38.308 and longitude -121.759. The mean elevation is 7 feet (2.1 m). Maine Prairie appears on the Dozier U.S. Geological Survey Map.

During the Civil War, it was a township large enough to support a California Militia Company, which was called the Maine Prairie Rifles. This company resided in the area from September 19, 1863 to June 23, 1868. The township appears on an 1890 map of Solano County.

== History ==
For nearly the town's entire existence, it was a farming community, based around the growth and sale of grain and produce. In 1866, the small town shipped approximately 30,000 tons of produce to market.

The township had an established post office beginning in April 1862. The town suffered from frequent flooding, especially in its early years, an example of which is shown in 1864 there was a severe flood in the area, which caused a "large number of cattle" to drown. There was controversy in 1865, when the Central Pacific Railroad was acquiring property in the area, and there was potential that land owners within twenty miles of the rail line would be forced to buy their land back from the railroad company because of a provision in the Pacific Railroad Acts.

A First Baptist Church was established on April 16, 1867, with a total of six initial members. The town was close to obtaining its own rail connection through the proposed "Maine Prairie and Cache Creek Narrow Gauge Railroad", which was supported by many farmers, ranchers, and landowners in the area, but did not have the financial backing to get started.

In addition to its farming, the town of Maine Prairie was also known for its hunting grounds, specifically for goose hunting. It was popular enough that former President Benjamin Harrison, and Supreme Court Justice Joseph McKenna took part in a hunting expedition that took place in Maine Prairie.
