= Solano County, California =

County in California, United States

Solano County
- County
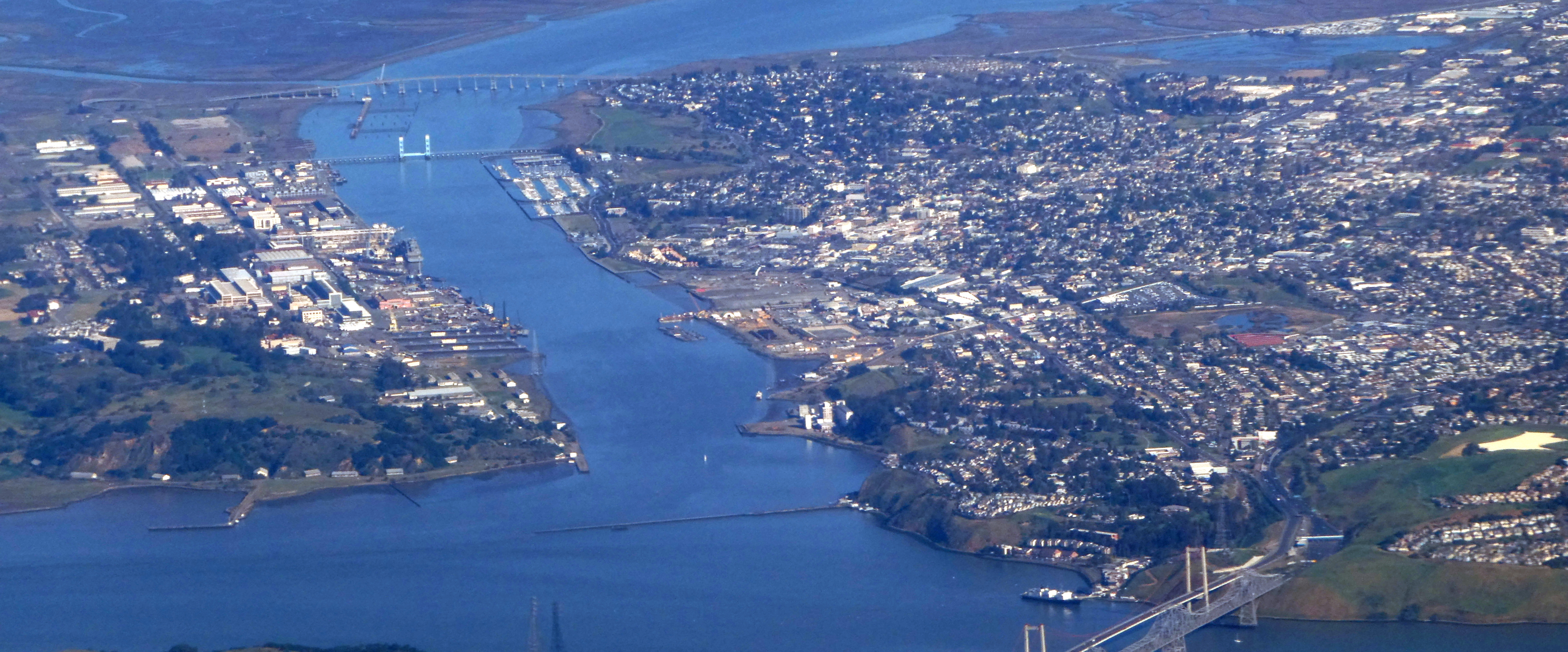
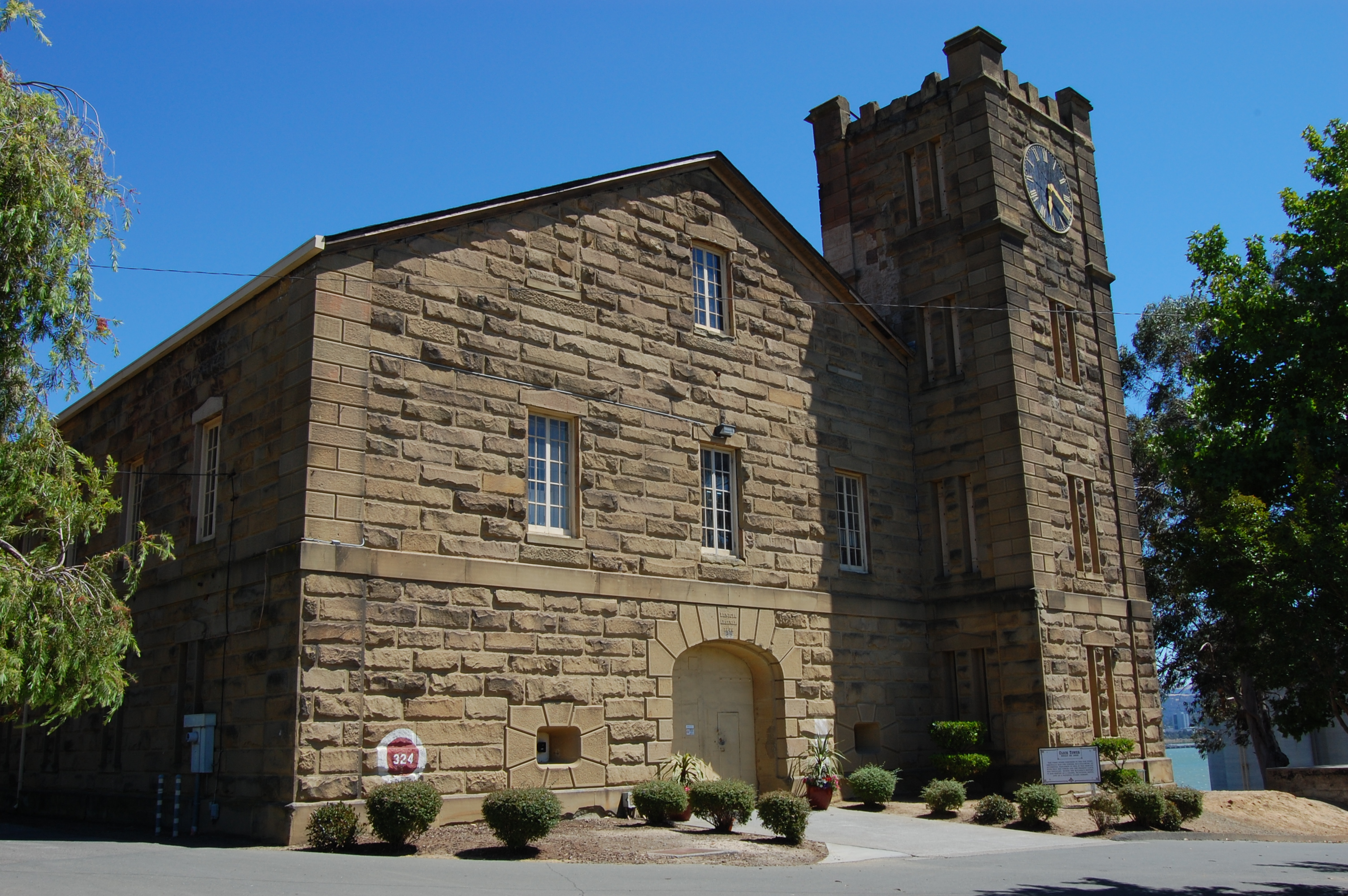
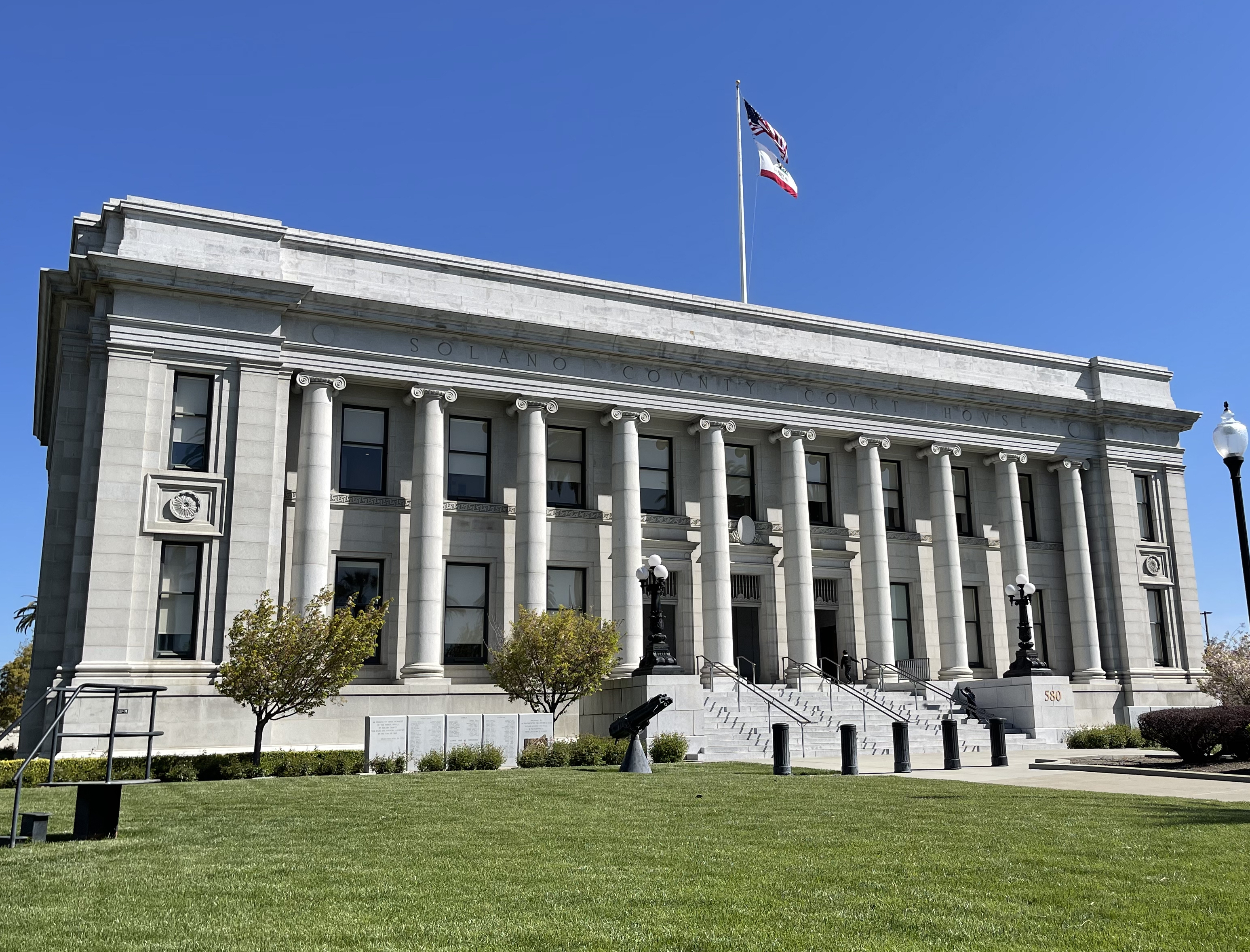
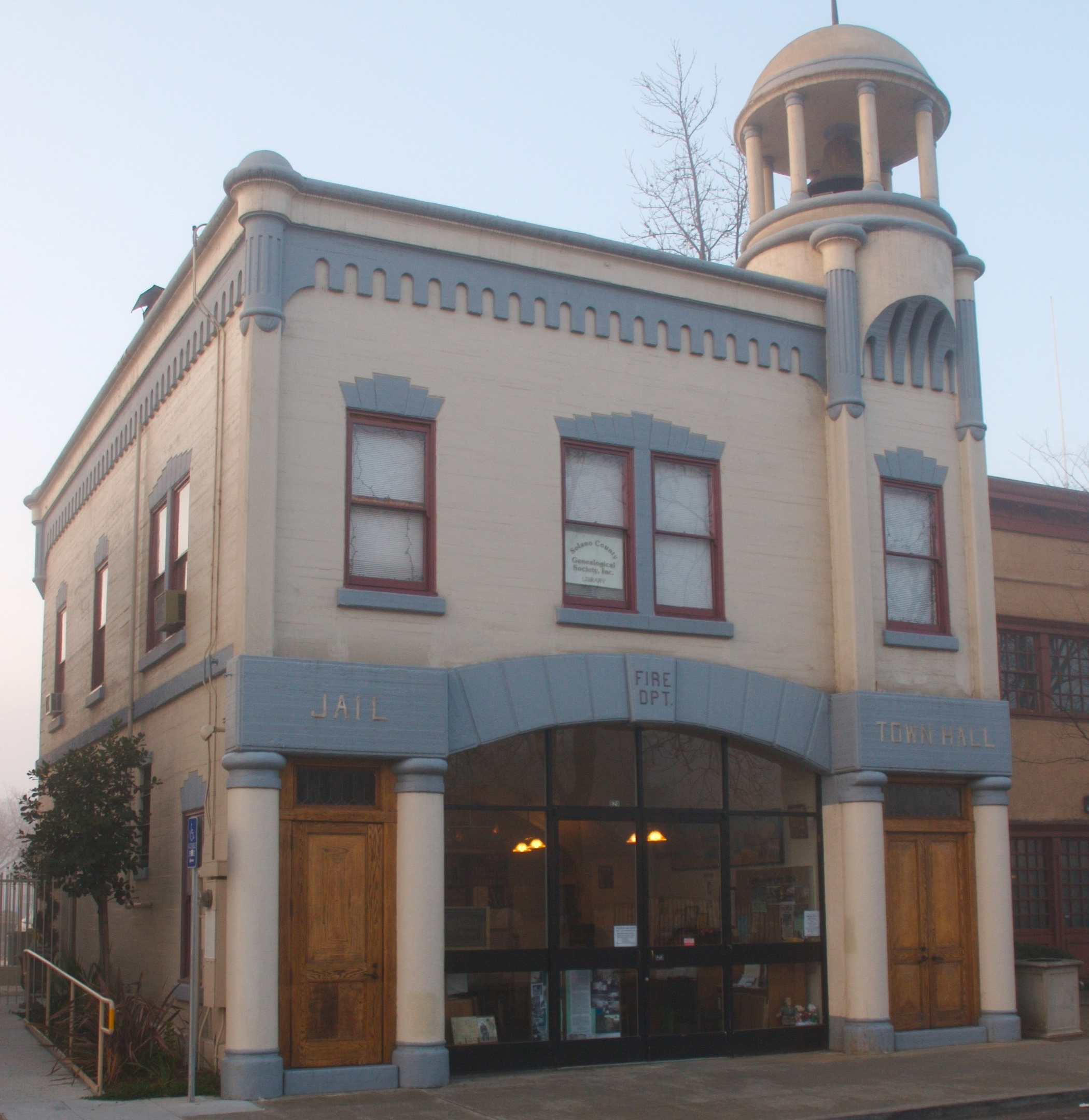
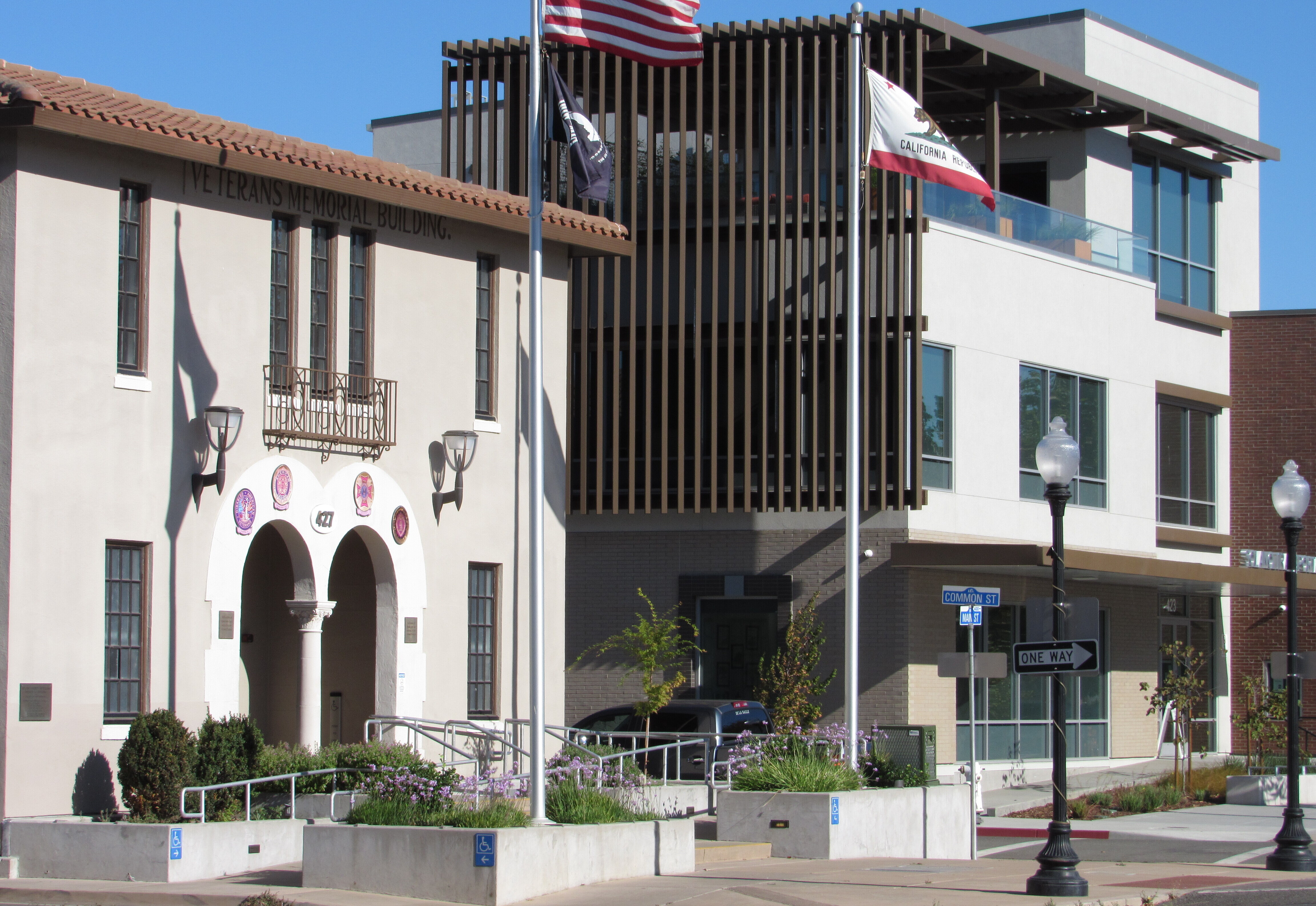
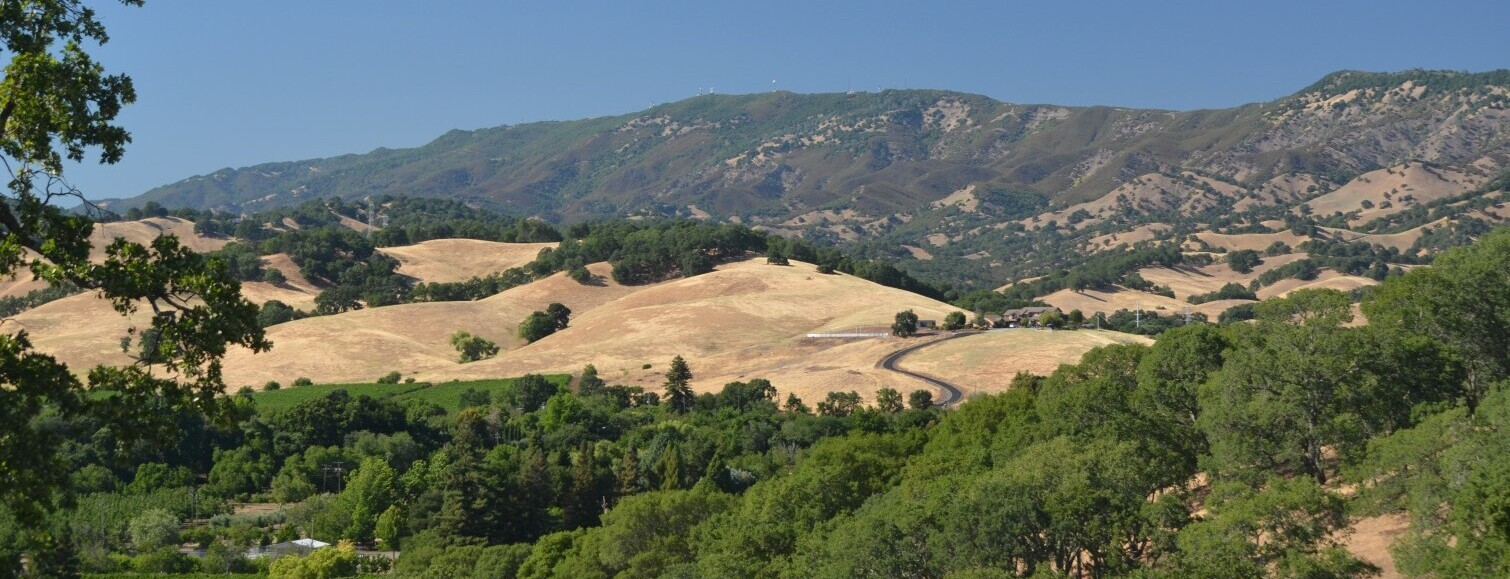
- Vallejo and the Napa River Benicia Fairfield Vacaville Suisun City Mount Vaca and the Vaca Mountains

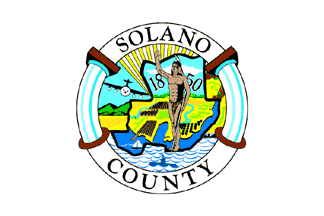
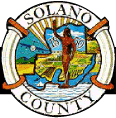
- Flag Seal
- Interactive map of Solano County
- Location in the state of California
- Coordinates: 38.27°N 121.94°W
- Country: United States
- State: California
- Region: Bay Area
- Incorporated: February 18, 1850
- Named for: Chief Solano of the Suisun people
- County seat: Fairfield
- Largest city: Vallejo (population); Fairfield (area)

Government
  - Type: Council–Administrator
  - Body: Board of Supervisors: Cassandra James; Monica Brown; Wanda Williams; John Vasquez; Mitch Mashburn
  - Chair: Monica Brown
  - Vice Chair: Cassandra James
  - Chair Pro Tem: Wanda Williams
  - County Administrator: William F. Emlen

Area
  - Total: 906 sq mi (2,350 km^{2})
  - Land: 810 sq mi (2,100 km^{2})
  - Water: 96 sq mi (250 km^{2})
- Highest elevation: 2,822 ft (860 m)

Population (2020)
  - Total: 453,491
  - Estimate (2025): 455,376 ▲
  - Density: 552/sq mi (213/km^{2})

GDP
  - Total: $35.408 billion (2022)
- Time zone: UTC−8 (Pacific Time Zone)
  - Summer (DST): UTC−7 (Pacific Daylight Time)
- Area code: 707, 369
- FIPS code: 06-095
- GNIS feature ID: 277312
- Congressional districts: 4th, 7th, 8th
- Website: solanocounty.com

Solano County (/səˈlɑːnoʊ/) is a county in the northeastern San Francisco Bay Area. As of the 2020 census, its population was 453,491. The county seat is Fairfield.

Solano County comprises the Vallejo–Fairfield metropolitan statistical area, which is also included in the San Jose–San Francisco–Oakland, CA combined statistical area.

== History ==
Solano County was one of the original counties of California, created in 1850 at the time of statehood.

At the request of General Mariano Guadalupe Vallejo, the county was named for Chief Solano of the Suisun people, a Native American tribe of the region and Vallejo's close ally. Chief Solano at one time led the tribes between the Petaluma River and the Sacramento River. The chief was also called Sem-Yeto, which signifies "brave or fierce hand". The chief was given the Spanish name Francisco Solano during baptism at the Catholic Mission, and is named after the Spanish Franciscan missionary Father Francisco Solano.

Travis Air Force Base is located just east of Fairfield. Between 2017 and 2023, California Forever purchased over 50,000 acres of land in the county for an estimated $900 million to develop a new city.

== Region ==
Solano County is the easternmost county of the North Bay. As such, it is sometimes reported by news agencies as being in the East Bay. Additionally, a portion of the county extends into the Sacramento Valley, geographically.

== Geography ==
According to the U.S. Census Bureau, the county has a total area of 906 square miles (2,350 km^{2}), of which 84 square miles (220 km^{2}), comprising 9.3%, are covered by water.

Solano County had several cinnabar mines that operated in the first half of the 20th century, including the Hastings Mine and St. John's Mine.

=== Adjacent counties ===
- Contra Costa County - south
- Sonoma County - west
- Napa County - west
- Yolo County - north
- Sacramento County - east

=== National protected area ===
- San Pablo Bay National Wildlife Refuge (part)

=== Flora and fauna ===
Solano County has a number of rare and endangered species, including the delta green ground beetle, the wildflower Lasthenia conjugens, commonly known as Contra Costa goldfields, and the annual plant Legenere limosa or false Venus' looking glass.

== Transportation ==
=== Major highways ===
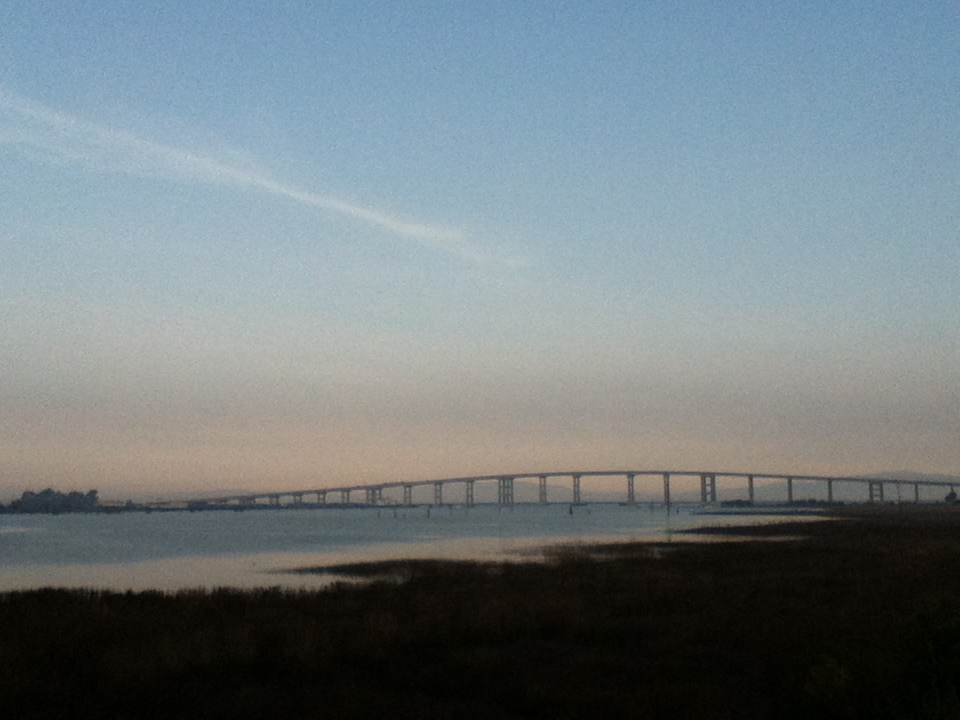
Highway 37 Bridge over the Napa River in Vallejo

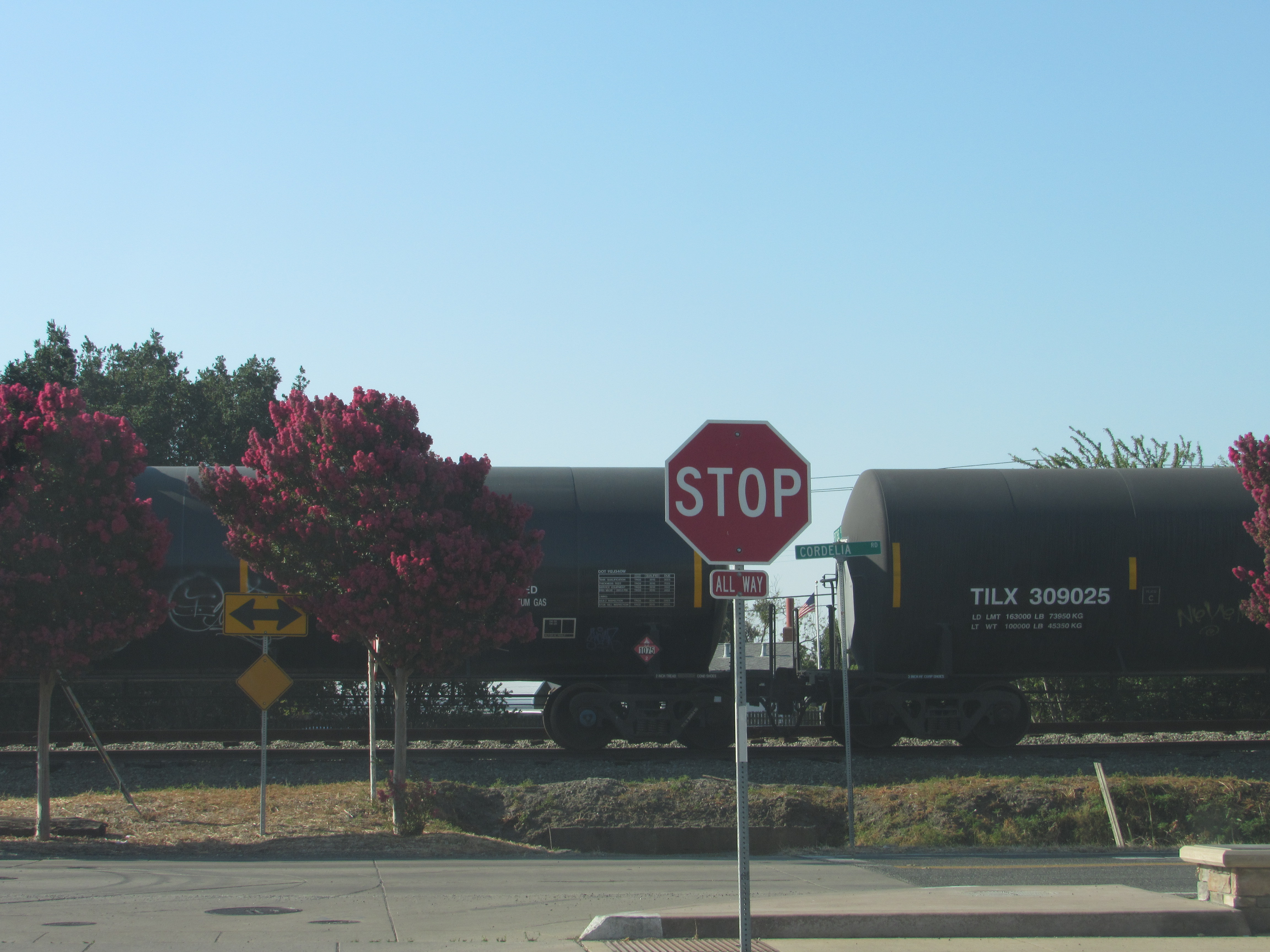
A train sits behind a stop sign at an intersection in Cordelia, California.

- I-80
- I-505
- I-680
- I-780
- SR 12
- SR 29
- SR 37
- SR 84
- SR 113
- SR 128
- SR 220

=== Public transportation ===
Solano County is served by several transit agencies:

- SolTrans, formed as a merger between these two existing transit agencies:
  - Vallejo Transit, which also formerly operated the Baylink Ferry to San Francisco
  - Benicia Breeze
- San Francisco Bay Ferry, with a terminal in Vallejo
- Fairfield and Suisun Transit
- Vacaville City Coach
- Rio Vista Delta Breeze

Each agency interconnects with the others, enabling transit trips throughout the county. Service also connects with BART stations in Contra Costa County. Transit links are provided to Napa, Yolo and Sacramento counties as well.

Greyhound and Amtrak provide long-distance intercity service.

=== Airports ===
General aviation airports in Solano County that are open to the public include the Nut Tree Airport and Rio Vista Municipal Airport.

== Demographics ==
Historical population
Census	Pop.	Note	%±
1850	580		—
1860	7,169		1,136.0%
1870	16,871		135.3%
1880	18,475		9.5%
1890	20,946		13.4%
1900	24,143		15.3%
1910	27,559		14.1%
1920	40,602		47.3%
1930	40,834		0.6%
1940	49,118		20.3%
1950	104,833		113.4%
1960	134,597		28.4%
1970	169,941		26.3%
1980	235,203		38.4%
1990	340,421		44.7%
2000	394,542		15.9%
2010	413,344		4.8%
2020	453,491		9.7%
2025 (est.)	455,376	▲	0.4%
U.S. Decennial Census; 1790–1960 1900–1990; 1990–2000 2010 2020

=== 2020 census ===
As of the 2020 census, the county had a population of 453,491. The median age was 39.0 years. 21.8% of residents were under the age of 18 and 16.5% of residents were 65 years of age or older. For every 100 females there were 98.3 males, and for every 100 females age 18 and over there were 96.7 males age 18 and over.

The racial makeup of the county was 38.8% White, 13.7% Black or African American, 1.2% American Indian and Alaska Native, 16.0% Asian, 0.9% Native Hawaiian and Pacific Islander, 14.7% from some other race, and 14.7% from two or more races. Hispanic or Latino residents of any race comprised 28.3% of the population.

95.5% of residents lived in urban areas, while 4.5% lived in rural areas.

There were 155,924 households in the county, of which 34.2% had children under the age of 18 living with them and 26.9% had a female householder with no spouse or partner present. About 21.6% of all households were made up of individuals and 9.8% had someone living alone who was 65 years of age or older.

There were 162,237 housing units, of which 3.9% were vacant. Among occupied housing units, 62.4% were owner-occupied and 37.6% were renter-occupied. The homeowner vacancy rate was 0.9% and the rental vacancy rate was 4.4%.

=== Racial and ethnic composition ===
Solano County, California – Racial and ethnic composition Note: the US Census treats Hispanic/Latino as an ethnic category. This table excludes Latinos from the racial categories and assigns them to a separate category. Hispanics/Latinos may be of any race.
Race / Ethnicity (NH = Non-Hispanic)	Pop 1980	Pop 1990	Pop 2000	Pop 2010	Pop 2020	% 1980	% 1990	% 2000	% 2010	% 2020
White alone (NH)	163,371	207,476	194,282	168,628	155,125	69.46%	60.95%	49.24%	40.80%	34.21%
Black or African American alone (NH)	27,372	43,858	57,597	58,743	60,051	11.64%	12.88%	14.60%	14.21%	13.24%
Native American or Alaska Native alone (NH)	1,981	2,469	2,194	1,864	1,624	0.84%	0.73%	0.56%	0.45%	0.36%
Asian alone (NH)	17,377	40,494	49,399	59,027	70,953	7.39%	11.90%	12.52%	14.28%	15.65%
Native Hawaiian or Pacific Islander alone (NH)	x	x	2,859	3,243	3,775	x	x	0.72%	0.78%	0.83%
Other race alone (NH)	329	607	955	1,463	2,988	0.14%	0.18%	0.24%	0.35%	0.66%
Mixed race or Multiracial (NH)	x	x	17,658	21,020	30,820	x	x	4.48%	5.09%	6.80%
Hispanic or Latino (any race)	24,773	45,517	69,598	99,356	128,155	10.53%	13.37%	17.64%	24.04%	28.26%
Total	235,203	340,421	394,542	413,344	453,491	100.00%	100.00%	100.00%	100.00%	100.00%

=== American Community Survey 2025 data ===
The United States Census Bureau estimated that in 2025, Solano County’s population was 455.376. It was also estimated that the county's population was 30,89% Non-Hispanic White, 31,80% Hispanic or Latino, 12,53% Non-Hispanic Black, 17,09% Asian, 0,35% Native American, 0,89% Pacific Islander, and 6,44% Multiracial.

Total	Population	Percentage
Non-Hispanic White	140.668	30,89%
Hispanic or Latino	144.794	31,80%
Non-Hispanic Black	57.071	12,53%
Asian	77.839	17,09%
Native American	1.609	0,35%
Pacific Islander	4.052	0,89%
Non-Hispanic Multiracial	29.343	6,44%

=== 2014 ===
A 2014 analysis by The Atlantic found Solano County to be the 5th most racially diverse county in the United States, behind Aleutians West Census Area and Aleutians East Borough in Alaska, Queens County in New York, and Alameda County in California.

=== 2010 ===
The 2010 United States census reported that Solano County had a population of 413,344. The racial makeup of Solano County was 210,751 (51.0%) White, 60,750 (14.7%) African American, 3,212 (0.8%) Native American, 60,473 (14.6%) Asian, 3,564 (0.9%) Pacific Islander, 43,236 (10.5%) from other races, and 31,358 (7.6%) from two or more races. Hispanic or Latino of any race were 99,356 persons (24.0%). At 52,641 Filipinos in the county making up 12% of the population, Solano County has the largest percentage Filipino population of any county in the United States.

Population racial makeup reported at 2010 United States census
County	Total population	White	African; American	Native; American	Asian	Pacific; Islander	Other races	Two or more races	Hispanic or Latino (of any race)
Solano County	413,344	210,751	60,750	3,212	60,473	3,564	43,236	31,358	99,356
Incorporated cities and towns	Total population	White	African; American	Native; American	Asian	Pacific; Islander	Other races	Two or more races	Hispanic or Latino (of any race)
Benicia	26,997	19,568	1,510	135	2,989	102	895	1,798	3,248
Dixon	18,351	13,023	562	184	671	58	2,838	1,015	7,426
Fairfield	105,321	48,407	16,586	869	15,700	1,149	13,301	9,309	28,789
Rio Vista	7,360	6,003	372	53	359	15	288	270	914
Suisun City	28,111	10,805	5,713	196	5,348	340	2,898	2,811	6,753
Vacaville	92,428	61,301	9,510	846	5,606	532	8,136	6,497	21,121
Vallejo	115,942	38,064	25,572	757	28,895	1,239	12,759	8,656	26,165
Census-designated places	Total population	White	African; American	Native; American	Asian	Pacific; Islander	Other races	Two or more races	Hispanic or Latino (of any race)
Allendale	1,506	1,239	49	22	42	2	79	73	235
Elmira	188	150	1	10	2	0	17	8	47
Green Valley	1,625	1,412	41	6	82	9	20	55	121
Hartley	2,510	1,956	70	24	70	16	248	126	510
Other unincorporated areas	Total population	White	African; American	Native; American	Asian	Pacific; Islander	Other races	Two or more races	Hispanic or Latino (of any race)
All others not CDPs (combined)	13,005	8,823	764	110	709	102	1,757	740	4,027

=== 2000 ===
At the 2000 census there were 394,542 people, 130,403 households, and 97,411 families in the county. The population density was 476 inhabitants per square mile (184/km^{2}). There were 134,513 housing units at an average density of 162 per square mile (63/km^{2}). The racial makeup of the county was 56.4% White, 14.9% Black or African American, 0.8% Native American, 12.8% Asian, 0.8% Pacific Islander, 8.0% from other races, and 6.4% from two or more races. 17.64% of the population were Hispanic or Latino of any race. 8.5% were of German, 6.4% Irish and 6.0% English ancestry according to Census 2000. 75.7% spoke English, 12.1% Spanish and 6.6% Tagalog as their first language. Of the 130,403 households 39.9% had children under the age of 18 living with them, 55.7% were married couples living together, 13.8% had a female householder with no husband present, and 25.3% were non-families. 19.6% of households were one person and 6.5% were one person aged 65 or older. The average household size was 2.90 and the average family size was 3.33.

The age distribution was 28.3% under the age of 18, 9.2% from 18 to 24, 31.3% from 25 to 44, 21.7% from 45 to 64, and 9.5% 65 or older. The median age was 34 years. For every 100 females there were 101.5 males. For every 100 females age 18 and over, there were 100.2 males.

The median household income was $54,099 and the median family income was $60,597. Males had a median income of $41,787 versus $31,916 for females. The per capita income for the county was $21,731. About 6.1% of families and 8.3% of the population were below the poverty line, including 10.3% of those under age 18 and 6.3% of those age 65 or over.

== Crime ==
The following table includes the number of incidents reported and the rate per 1,000 persons for each type of offense (2011).

Population and crime rates
Population	411,620	
Violent crime	2,064	5.01
Homicide	20	0.05
Forcible rape	112	0.27
Robbery	810	1.97
Aggravated assault	1,122	2.73
Property crime	8,460	20.55
Burglary	4,168	10.13
Larceny-theft (Note: Only larceny-theft cases involving property over $400 in value are reported as property crimes.)	7,018	17.05
Motor vehicle theft	2,084	5.06
Arson	116	0.28

=== Cities by population and crime rates ===
Cities by population and crime rates
City	Population	Violent crimes	Violent crime rate per 1,000 persons	Property crimes	Property crime rate per 1,000 persons
Benicia	27,459	37	1.35	390	14.20
Dixon	18,708	53	2.83	315	16.84
Fairfield	107,110	454	4.24	3,317	30.97
Rio Vista	7,485	39	5.21	145	19.37
Suisun City	28,593	57	1.99	558	19.52
Vacaville	93,951	246	2.62	2,031	21.62
Vallejo	117,912	878	7.45	5,844	49.56

== Government and politics ==
=== Government ===
The Government of Solano County is defined and authorized under the California Constitution and law as a general law county. The County government provides countywide services such as elections and voter registration, law enforcement, jails, vital records, property records, tax collection, public health, and social services. In addition the County serves as the local government for all unincorporated areas.

The County government is composed of the elected five-member Board of Supervisors, several other elected offices including the Sheriff-Coroner, District Attorney, Assessor/Recorder, Auditor-Controller, and Treasurer/Tax Collector/County Clerk, and numerous county departments and entities under the supervision of the County Administrator. As of March 2023, the members of the Solano County Board of Supervisors were:

- Cassandra James, District 1
- Monica Brown, District 2, Vice Chair
- Wanda Williams, District 3
- John Vasquez, District 4
- Mitch Mashburn, District 5, Chair

=== Politics ===
==== Voter registration statistics ====
Population and registered voters
Total population	411,620	
Registered voters (Note: Percentage of registered voters with respect to total population. Percentages of party members with respect to registered voters follow.)	210,453	51.1%
Democratic	102,177	48.6%
Republican	52,633	25.0%
Democratic–Republican spread	+49,544	+23.6%
Independent	5,940	2.8%
Green	878	0.4%
Libertarian	1,123	0.5%
Peace and Freedom	539	0.3%
Americans Elect	12	0.0%
Other	905	0.4%
No party preference	46,246	22.0%

Cities by population and voter registration
City	Population	Registered voters	Democratic	Republican	D–R spread	Other	No party preference
Benicia	26,981	68.1%	47.2%	25.3%	+21.9%	8.4%	22.1%
Dixon	18,141	50.7%	38.8%	35.4%	+3.4%	7.3%	21.4%
Fairfield	104,404	48.1%	48.7%	24.4%	+24.3%	6.8%	22.7%
Rio Vista	7,088	72.6%	42.7%	33.9%	+8.8%	9.0%	18.2%
Suisun City	27,900	49.1%	52.4%	20.2%	+32.2%	7.0%	23.2%
Vacaville	92,217	50.1%	39.6%	33.2%	+6.4%	8.5%	22.1%
Vallejo	116,021	48.8%	59.9%	14.5%	+45.4%	6.1%	21.8%

==== Overview ====
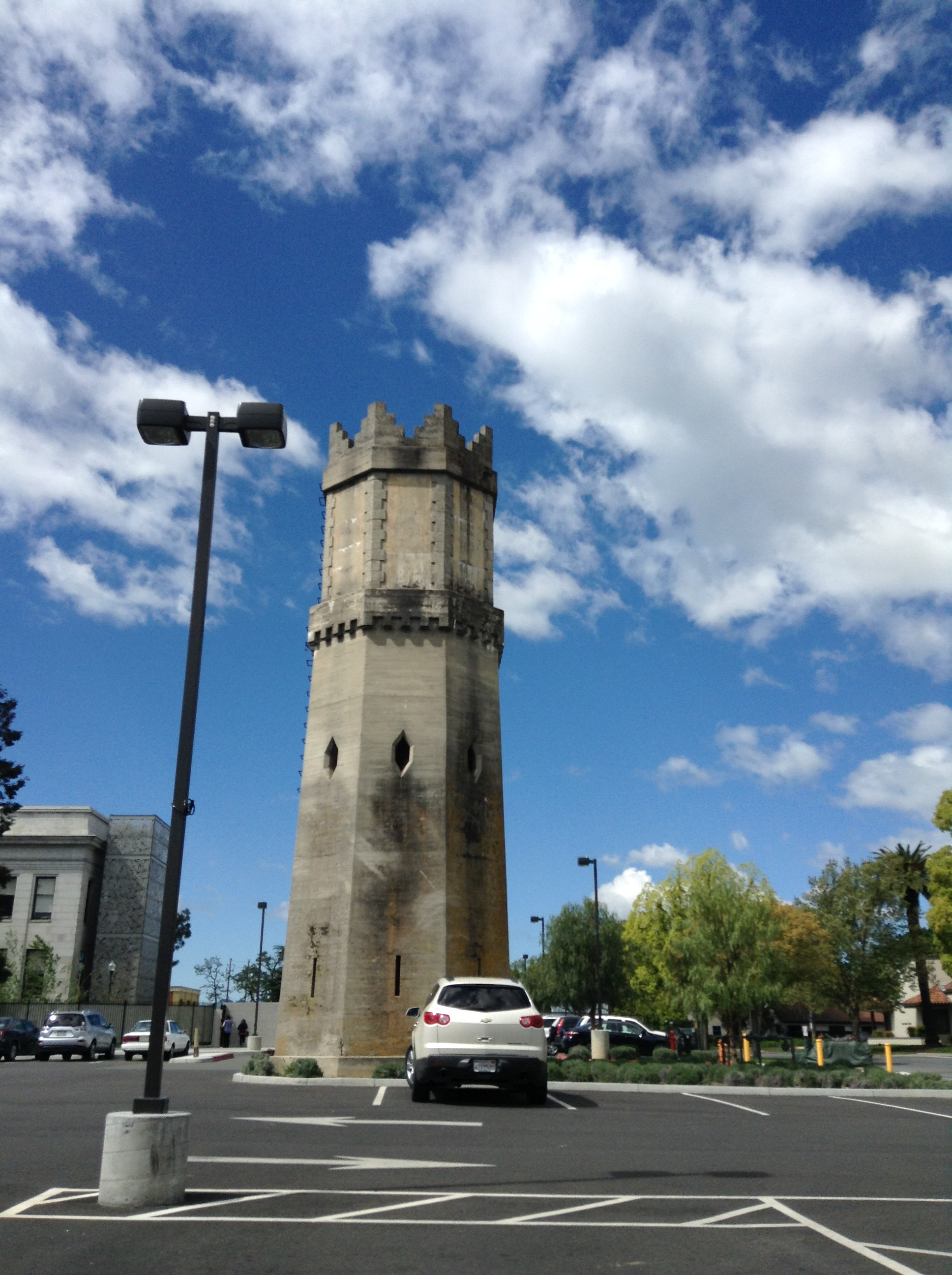
Solano County courthouse tower in parking lot

Solano County has been a Democratic stronghold in presidential and congressional elections, with Californians Richard Nixon (in 1972) and Ronald Reagan (in 1980 and 1984) being the only Republicans to win the county since 1928. However, the northern area of Solano County including Vacaville and Dixon have begun shifting right as evidenced by the 2022 midterms, voters in Congressional District 4 favoring the Republican candidate 50.3% to 49.7%.

United States presidential election results for Solano County, California (Note: This total comprised 3,353 votes for Progressive Theodore Roosevelt (who was official Republican nominee in California), 781 votes for Socialist Eugene V. Debs and 169 votes for Prohibition Party nominee Eugene W. Chafin.)
Year	Republican		Democratic		Third party(ies)	
Year	No.	%	No.	%	No.	%
1880	1,963	49.80%	1,959	49.70%	20	0.51%
1884	2,382	53.61%	1,977	44.50%	84	1.89%
1888	2,231	49.67%	2,158	48.04%	103	2.29%
1892	2,403	49.21%	2,174	44.52%	306	6.27%
1896	2,702	53.19%	2,284	44.96%	94	1.85%
1900	3,114	55.36%	2,262	40.21%	249	4.43%
1904	3,176	61.37%	1,555	30.05%	444	8.58%
1908	3,115	54.72%	2,033	35.71%	545	9.57%
1912	40	0.50%	3,650	45.66%	4,303	53.83%
1916	3,536	36.35%	5,678	58.37%	514	5.28%
1920	7,102	64.77%	2,954	26.94%	909	8.29%
1924	4,782	48.00%	957	9.61%	4,223	42.39%
1928	7,061	52.32%	6,278	46.51%	158	1.17%
1932	4,382	30.30%	9,712	67.16%	367	2.54%
1936	3,603	20.89%	13,459	78.05%	182	1.06%
1940	6,081	28.51%	15,054	70.58%	193	0.90%
1944	10,361	29.77%	24,335	69.93%	105	0.30%
1948	12,345	33.71%	23,257	63.50%	1,022	2.79%
1952	19,369	42.37%	26,130	57.16%	216	0.47%
1956	17,865	41.68%	24,903	58.10%	95	0.22%
1960	18,751	40.88%	26,977	58.81%	141	0.31%
1964	15,263	30.38%	34,930	69.53%	47	0.09%
1968	17,683	34.71%	27,271	53.52%	5,998	11.77%
1972	31,314	54.02%	24,766	42.73%	1,885	3.25%
1976	26,136	42.40%	33,682	54.64%	1,826	2.96%
1980	40,919	50.72%	30,952	38.37%	8,805	10.91%
1984	51,678	54.51%	41,982	44.29%	1,138	1.20%
1988	50,314	47.43%	54,344	51.23%	1,430	1.35%
1992	38,883	29.43%	64,320	48.69%	28,908	21.88%
1996	40,742	34.74%	64,644	55.12%	11,893	10.14%
2000	51,604	39.17%	75,116	57.02%	5,015	3.81%
2004	62,301	41.86%	85,096	57.17%	1,440	0.97%
2008	56,035	34.81%	102,095	63.42%	2,843	1.77%
2012	52,092	34.17%	96,783	63.49%	3,569	2.34%
2016	51,920	31.26%	102,360	61.62%	11,833	7.12%
2020	69,306	33.66%	131,639	63.94%	4,932	2.40%
2024	70,345	37.05%	113,997	60.04%	5,541	2.92%

Solano County is split between California's 4th, 7th and 8th congressional districts, represented by Mike Thompson (D–St. Helena), Doris Matsui (D–Sacramento) and John Garamendi (D–Walnut Grove) respectively.

In the California State Assembly, Solano County is split between the 4th Assembly district, represented by Democrat Cecilia Aguiar-Curry, and the 11th Assembly district, represented by Democrat Lori Wilson. In the California State Senate, it is in the 3rd senatorial district, represented by Democrat Christopher Cabaldon.

On November 4, 2008, Solano County voted 55.82% in favor of Proposition 8, which amended the California Constitution to ban same-sex marriages. It was the only Bay Area county to approve the initiative. In the 2008 presidential election that day, Barack Obama carried the county by a 28.5% margin over John McCain, a larger margin than statewide (24%).

According to the California Secretary of State, as of February 10, 2019, Solano County has 236,028 registered voters. Of those, 106,452 (45.1%) are registered Democrats, 50,006 (21.2%) are registered Republicans, and 66,558 (28.2%) have declined to state a political party. Democrats hold voter-registration advantages in all incorporated cities and towns in Solano County. However, Republicans lead in registration in the unincorporated communities of the county (40%-35%), making Solano the only county in the Bay Area where Republicans out-number Democrats in unincorporated communities. The Democrats' largest registration advantage in Solano is in the city of Vallejo, wherein there are only 8,242 Republicans (14.6%) out of 56,313 total voters compared to 33,753 Democrats (59.9%) and 12,157 voters who have declined to state a political party (21.6%).

== Communities ==
=== Cities ===
- Benicia
- Dixon
- Fairfield (county seat)
- Rio Vista
- Suisun City
- Vacaville
- Vallejo
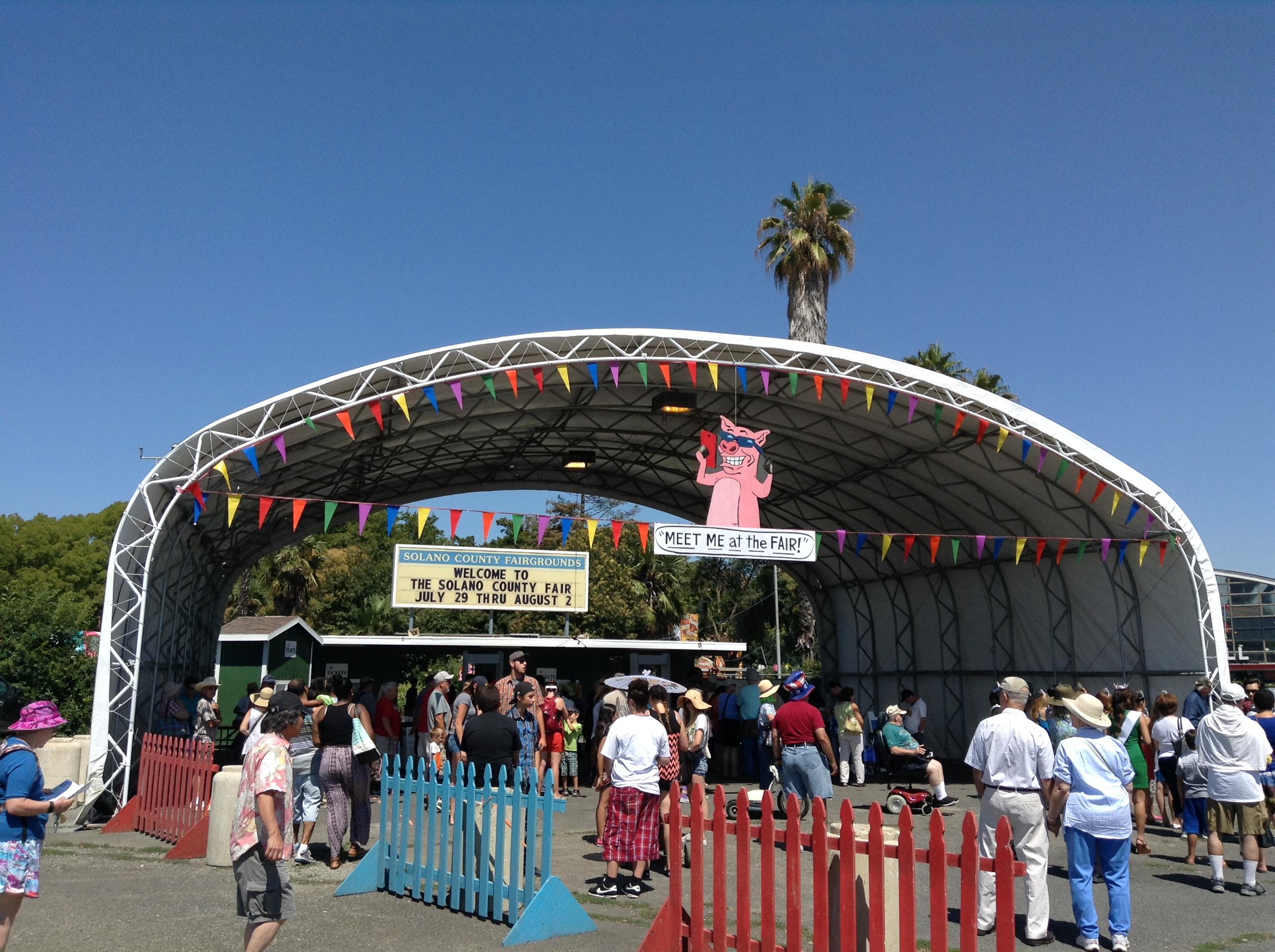
People line up at the gate to the Solano County Fair in Vallejo.

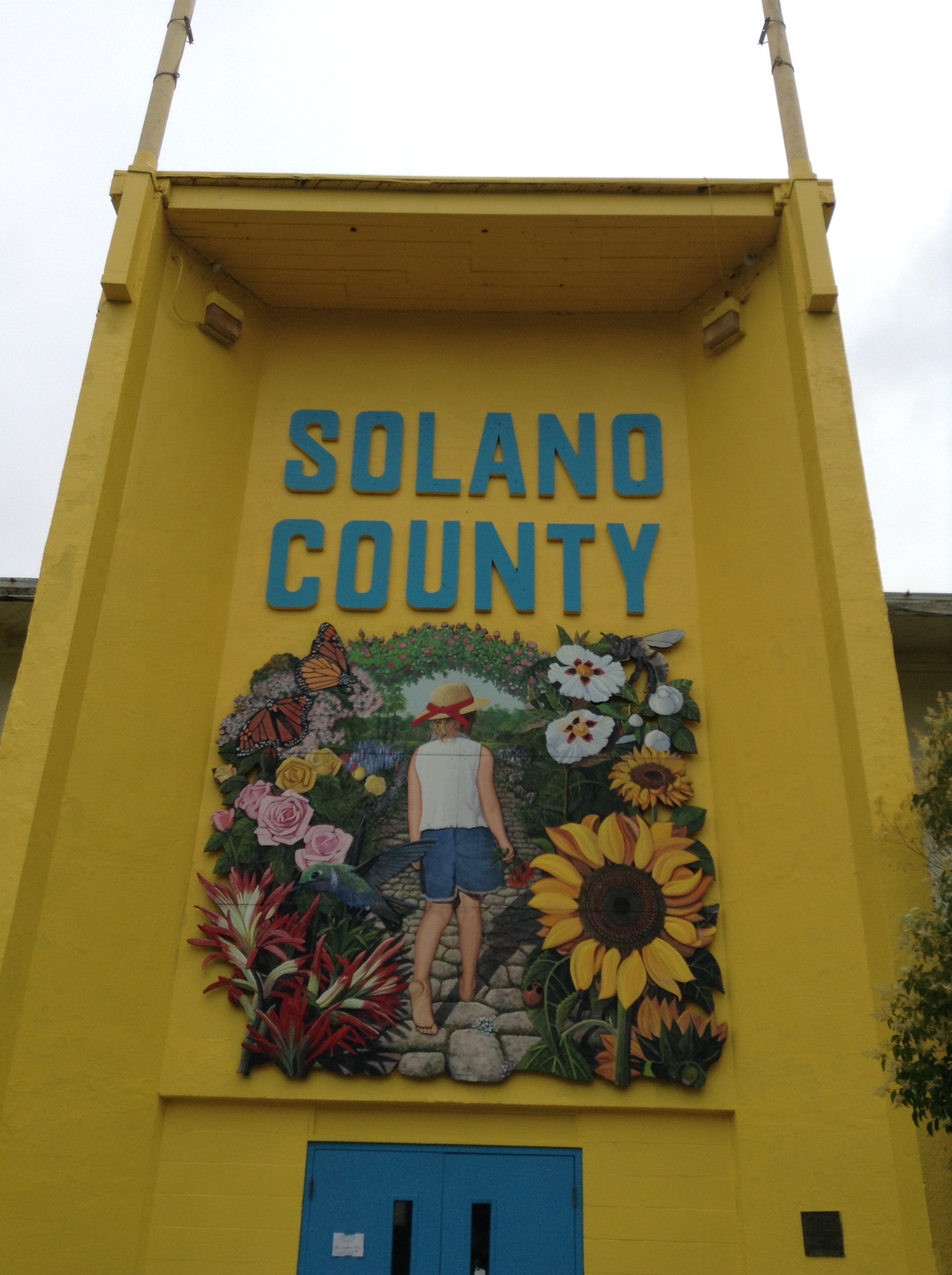
A building on the Solano County Fairgrounds

=== Census-designated places ===
- Allendale
- Elmira
- Green Valley
- Hartley

=== Other unincorporated communities ===
- Bahia
- Batavia
- Birds Landing
- Bucktown
- Collinsville
- Cordelia
- Denverton
- Maine Prairie
- Mankas Corner
- Rockville
- Scandia

=== Population ranking ===
The population ranking of the following table is based on the 2020 census of Solano County.

† county seat

Rank	Settlement	Municipal type	Population (2020 census)
1	Vallejo	City	126,090
2	† Fairfield	City	119,881
3	Vacaville	City	102,386
4	Suisun City	City	29,518
5	Benicia	City	27,131
6	Dixon	City	18,988
7	Rio Vista	City	10,005
8	Hartley	CDP	2,430
9	Green Valley	CDP	1,654
10	Allendale	CDP	1,651
11	Elmira	CDP	193

== Education ==
A portion of the South Campus at the University of California, Davis, is in Solano County.

School districts include:

- Benicia Unified School District
- Davis Joint Unified School District
- Dixon Unified School District
- Fairfield-Suisun Unified School District
- River Delta Joint Unified School District
- Travis Unified School District
- Vacaville Unified School District
- Vallejo City Unified School District
- Winters Joint Unified School District

== Miscellania ==
- In 1985 Humphrey the humpback whale strayed off his migration route and ended up in Shag Slough north of Rio Vista. Rescuers from the Marine Mammal Center and other volunteers dismantled a county bridge before being able to turn him around in the narrow slough.

== See also ==
- 1892 Vacaville–Winters earthquakes
- List of school districts in Solano County, California
- National Register of Historic Places listings in Solano County, California
- Solano County Library
- Tolenas Springs
