= Raymond C. Carrington =

Raymond C. Carrington is an American sculptor based in Northern California.

Carrington was born and raised in Dunsmuir, California. He graduated from the University of California with a Bachelor of Science degree in forestry. He has worked as a U.S. Air Force intelligence officer, taught mathematics at Vacaville High School, and owned a television news service. A collection of 211 of his sculptures is kept at the University of California, College of Natural Resources in Berkeley, California.
