= Buckingham Charter Magnet High School =

Buckingham Collegiate Charter Academy

Location
- Coordinates: 38°21′30″N 121°59′0″W

Information
- School district: Vacaville Unified School District
- NCES District ID: 0640590
- Principal: Samantha Working
- Teaching staff: 27.90 (FTE)
- Grades: 9–12
- Enrollment: 500 (2018-19)
- Student to teacher ratio: 17.92
- Schedule type: Block scheduling
- Colors: Maroon, Silver, and Black
- Mascot: Knights

Buckingham Collegiate Charter Academy, commonly referred to as BCCA, is a charter magnet school located in Vacaville, California. BCCA is California's 56th charter school and the 19th school in the Vacaville Unified School District.

== Demographics ==
White	Latino	Asian	African American	Pacific Islander	American Indian	Two or More Races
55%	19%	7%	9%	0%	0.4%	9%

According to U.S. News & World Report, 45% of Buckingham's student body is "of color," with 15% of the student body coming from an economically disadvantaged household, determined by student eligibility for California's Reduced-price meal program.
