= Green Valley, Solano County, California =

Green Valley
- Unincorporated Community; Census Designated Place
- Location in Solano County and the state of California

- Location in the United States
- Coordinates: 38°15′34″N 122°9′52″W
- Country: United States
- State: California
- County: Solano

Government
  - State Senator: Christopher Cabaldon (D)
  - CA Assembly: Lori Wilson (D)
  - U. S. Rep.: John Garamendi (D)

Area
  - Total: 8.375 sq mi (21.692 km^{2})
  - Land: 8.374 sq mi (21.688 km^{2})
  - Water: 0.0015 sq mi (0.004 km^{2}) 0.02%
- Elevation: 115 ft (35 m)

Population (2020)
  - Total: 1,654
  - Density: 197.5/sq mi (76.26/km^{2})
- Time zone: UTC-8 (PST)
  - Summer (DST): UTC-7 (PDT)
- ZIP code: 94534
- Area code: 707
- FIPS code: 06-31099
- GNIS feature ID: 1853394

Green Valley is a census-designated place (CDP) located in Solano County, California, United States. It sits in the northeastern corner of the San Francisco Bay Area and is located approximately 45 miles (72 km) from Sacramento, approximately 38 miles (61 km) from San Francisco, approximately 32 miles (51 km) from Oakland, less than 15 miles (24 km) from Napa Valley, and less than 15 miles (24 km) from both the Carquinez Bridge and the Benicia Bridge.

The use of "Green Valley" as a place name predates the CDP designation by over a century; a Green Valley Township appears on an 1890 map of Solano County.

The population was 1,654 at the 2020 census.

== History ==
On April 29, 1865, Confederate sympathizers in the town started "rejoicing over the death of President Lincoln." When news reached Benicia, a company of militia was sent to stop these acts of celebration. When the militia met the "party" of secessionists, gunfire was exchanged and two members of the militia were wounded. After several shots, the sympathizers surrendered to the militia, ending the short battle.

== Geography ==
Green Valley is located at 38°15′34″N 122°9′52″W (38.259313, -122.164441).

According to the United States Census Bureau, the CDP has a total area of 8.4 square miles (22 km^{2}), of which 99.98% is land and 0.02% is water.

== Demographics ==
Historical population
| Census | Pop. | Note | %± |
|---|---|---|---|
| 2000 | 1,859 | | — |
| 2010 | 1,625 | | −12.6% |
| 2020 | 1,654 | | 1.8% |
U.S. Decennial Census; 1860–1870 1880-1890; 1900 1910 1920; 1930 1940 1950; 1960 1970 1980; 1990 2000 2010

Green Valley first appeared as a census designated place in the 2000 U.S. census.

=== 2020 ===
The 2020 United States census reported that Green Valley had a population of 1,654. The population density was 197.5 inhabitants per square mile (76.3/km^{2}). The racial makeup was 1,297 (78.4%) White, 38 (2.3%) African American, 6 (0.4%) Native American, 107 (6.5%) Asian, 4 (0.2%) Pacific Islander, 27 (1.6%) from other races, and 175 (10.6%) from two or more races. Hispanic or Latino of any race were 168 persons (10.2%).

The whole population lived in households. There were 700 households, out of which 124 (17.7%) had children under the age of 18 living in them, 473 (67.6%) were married-couple households, 26 (3.7%) were cohabiting couple households, 113 (16.1%) had a female householder with no partner present, and 88 (12.6%) had a male householder with no partner present. 127 households (18.1%) were one person, and 84 (12.0%) were one person aged 65 or older. The average household size was 2.36. There were 536 families (76.6% of all households).

The age distribution was 205 people (12.4%) under the age of 18, 84 people (5.1%) aged 18 to 24, 238 people (14.4%) aged 25 to 44, 533 people (32.2%) aged 45 to 64, and 594 people (35.9%) who were 65 years of age or older. The median age was 58.5 years. For every 100 females, there were 93.5 males.

There were 733 housing units at an average density of 87.5 units per square mile (33.8 units/km^{2}), of which 700 (95.5%) were occupied. Of these, 653 (93.3%) were owner-occupied, and 47 (6.7%) were occupied by renters.

In 2023, the US Census Bureau estimated that the median household income in 2023 was $114,500, and the per capita income was $89,706. About 6.5% of families and 8.2% of the population were below the poverty line.

=== 2010 ===
The 2010 United States census reported that Green Valley had a population of 1,625. The population density was 195.6 inhabitants per square mile (75.5/km^{2}). The racial makeup of the CDP was 1,412 (86.9%) White, 41 (2.5%) African American, 6 (0.4%) Native American, 82 (5.0%) Asian, 9 (0.6%) Pacific Islander, 20 (1.2%) from other races, and 55 (3.4%) from two or more races. Hispanic or Latino of any race were 121 persons (7.4%).

The Census reported that 100% of the population lived in households.

There were 678 households, out of which 130 (19.2%) had children under the age of 18 living in them, 484 (71.4%) were opposite-sex married couples living together, 37 (5.5%) had a female householder with no husband present, 19 (2.8%) had a male householder with no wife present. There were 17 (2.5%) unmarried opposite-sex partnerships, and 6 (0.9%) same-sex married couples or partnerships. 108 households (15.9%) were made up of individuals, and 61 (9.0%) had someone living alone who was 65 years of age or older. The average household size was 2.40. There were 540 families (79.6% of all households); the average family size was 2.65.

The population was spread out, with 215 people (13.2%) under the age of 18, 96 people (5.9%) aged 18 to 24, 210 people (12.9%) aged 25 to 44, 633 people (39.0%) aged 45 to 64, and 471 people (29.0%) who were 65 years of age or older. The median age was 55.5 years. For every 100 females, there were 102.4 males. For every 100 females age 18 and over, there were 98.3 males.

There were 724 housing units at an average density of 87.1 units per square mile (33.6 units/km^{2}), of which 91.4% were owner-occupied and 8.6% were occupied by renters. The homeowner vacancy rate was 2.2%; the rental vacancy rate was 9.4%. 91.7% of the population lived in owner-occupied housing units and 8.3% lived in rental housing units.

== Education ==
The CDP is served by Fairfield-Suisun Unified School District.
