= Government of Solano County, California =

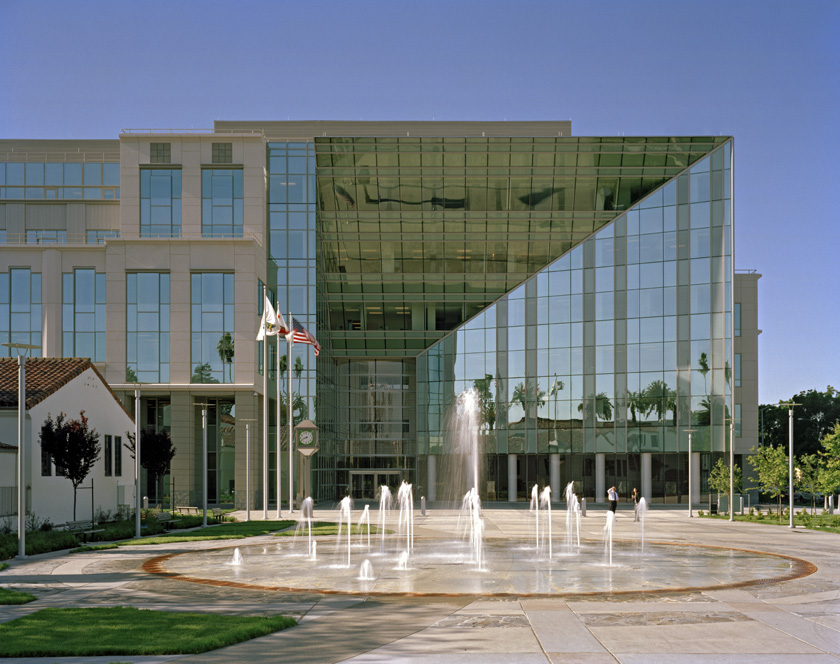
Solano County Government Center in Downtown Fairfield.

The government of Solano County operates as a general law county under the California Constitution and law. Much of the government of California is in practice the responsibility of county governments such as Solano County. The county government provides countywide services such as elections and voter registration, law enforcement, jails, vital records, property records, tax collection, public health, and social services. In addition the county serves as the local government for all unincorporated areas.

It is composed of the elected five-member Board of Supervisors, several other elected offices including the Sheriff-Coroner, District Attorney, Assessor/Recorder, Auditor-Controller, and Treasurer/Tax Collector/County Clerk, and numerous county departments and entities under the supervision of the County Administrator.

Some chartered cities such as Vallejo and Fairfield provide municipal services such as police, public safety, libraries, parks and recreation, and zoning. Some other cities arrange to have the County provide some or all of these services on a contract basis. In addition, several entities of the government of California have jurisdiction conterminous with Solano County, such as the Solano County Superior Court.

== Organization ==
=== Board of Supervisors ===
The five-member elected Solano County Board of Supervisors (BOS) is the county legislature. The board operates in a legislative, executive, and quasi-judicial capacity. As a legislative authority, it can pass ordinances for the unincorporated areas (ordinances that affect the whole county, like posting of restaurant ratings, must be ratified by the individual city). As an executive body, it can tell the county departments what to do, and how to do it. As a quasi-judicial body, the Board is the final venue of appeal in the local planning process.

As of April 2025, the members of the Solano County Board of Supervisors are:

- Cassandra James — District 1 (Vice Chair)
- Monica Brown — District 2 (Chair)
- Wanda Williams — District 3 (Chair Pro Tem)
- John Vasquez — District 4
- Mitch Mashburn — District 5

=== Elected officers ===
In addition to the Board of Supervisors, there are several elected officers that form the Government of Solano County that are required by the California Constitution and California law.

The Solano County Sheriff-Coroner provides general-service law enforcement to unincorporated areas of the county, serving as the equivalent of the county police for unincorporated areas of the county, as well as incorporated cities within the county who have contracted with the agency for law-enforcement services (known as "contract cities").

The Solano County District Attorney prosecutes felony and misdemeanor crimes that occur within the jurisdiction of Solano County.

=== Other departments ===
The Department of Health and Social Services (HSS) administers multiple California welfare programs within the county, such as Medi-Cal (Medicaid), CalFresh (food stamps), CalWORKs (Temporary Assistance for Needy Families), and a California Medical Service Program (CMSP) and its Low Income Health Program (Obamacare).

== Law ==
The Solano County Code is the codified law of the County in the form of ordinances passed by the Board of Supervisors. Every act prohibited or declared unlawful, and every failure to perform an act required, by the ordinances are misdemeanor crimes, unless otherwise specified as infractions.

== Other governments ==
=== California ===
The Solano Superior Court, which covers the entire county, is not a County department but a division of the State's trial court system. Historically, the courthouses were county-owned buildings that were maintained at county expense, which created significant friction since the trial court judges, as officials of the state government, had to lobby the county Board of Supervisors for facility renovations and upgrades. In turn, the state judiciary successfully persuaded the state Legislature to authorize the transfer of all courthouses to the state government in 2008 and 2009 (so that judges would have direct control over their own courthouses). Courthouse security is still provided by the county government under a contract with the state.

=== Vallejo ===
The Government of Vallejo is defined under the Charter of the City of Vallejo. It is a council–manager government and consists of the Mayor, City Council, and numerous departments and officers under the supervision of the City Manager, such as the Vallejo Police Department, Vallejo Fire Department, Vallejo Public Works Department, and Vallejo Economic Development Department.

- Andrea Sorce (Mayor)
- Peter Bregenzer (Vice-Mayor)
- Helen-Marie Gordon
- Tonia Lediju, PhD
- Alexander Matias
- Diosdado "JR" Mtulac
- Charles Palmares

=== School districts ===
Solano County is covered by the Solano County Community College District and trustee district 5 of the San Joaquin Delta Community College District.

=== Special districts ===
The Solano County Local Agency Formation Commission is the Local Agency Formation Commission (LAFCo) for Solano County and regulates most special district and city boundaries.
