= Robyn Stevens =

American athlete

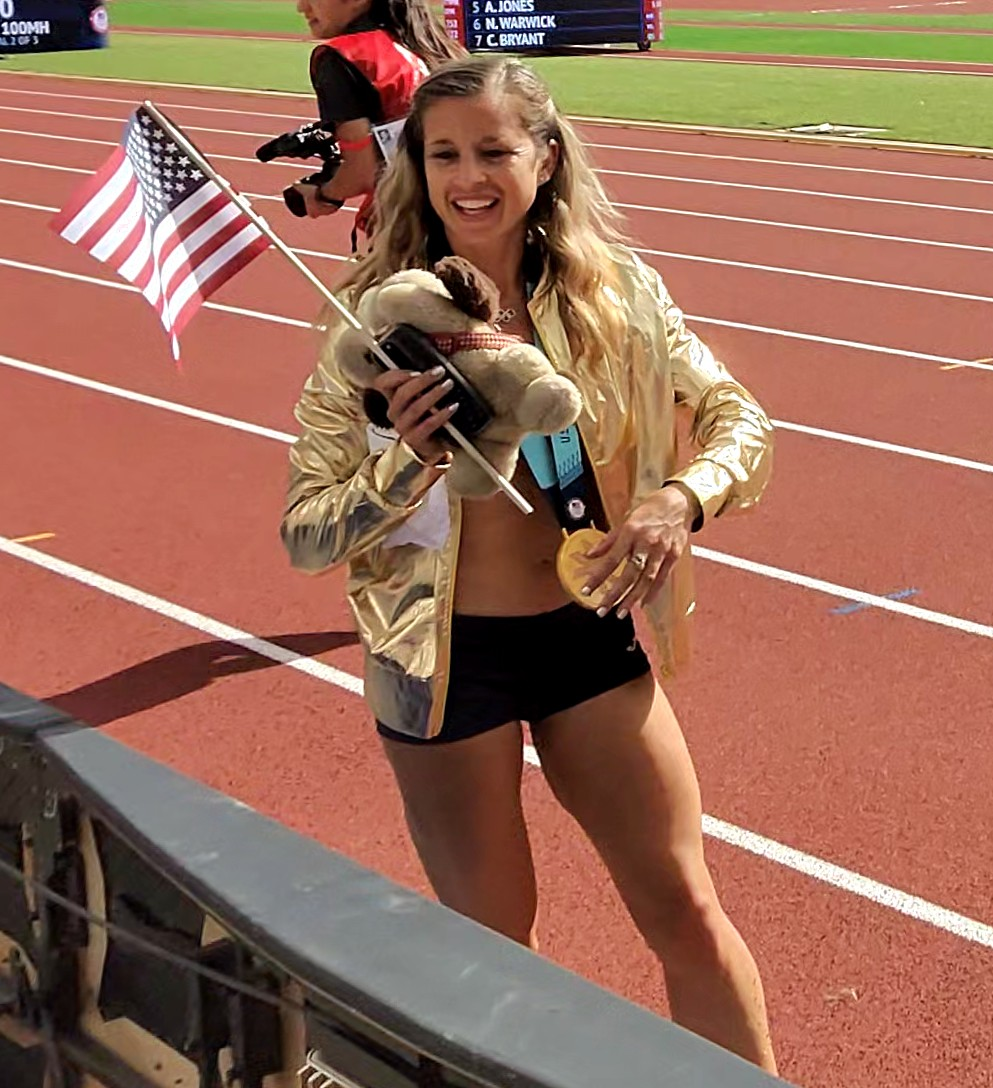
- Stevens in 2024

Personal information
- Born: April 24, 1983 (age 43) Vacaville, California
- Height: 5 ft 3 in (160 cm)

Sport
- Sport: Track and field
- Event: 20 kilometres race walk
- College team: San Jose State Spartans

Robyn Stevens (born April 24, 1983) is an American Olympic race walker. She competed for Vacaville High School, then went on to run cross country at San José State University. Stevens suffered from an eating disorder and body dysmorphia while attending, which forced her to quit racing in 2004. She did not compete again until 2014. She competed in the 2020 Summer Olympics in Tokyo in 2021.

== Competition ==
In 2019, Stevens won the U.S. 50 kilometer race walk championship, and repeated her win on January 25, 2020, in Santee, California, with a time of 4:37:31, leading from start to finish and winning by over 9 1/2 minutes. On February 2, she won the Utah indoor 3000 meters race walk. At the Millrose Games indoor mile in New York City on February 8, 2020, after an absence of 19 years, Stevens led for over half the race. She was passed by Ohio high school star Taylor Ewert who won in 6:34:63, and Lauren Harris, second in 6:39.31, with Stevens finishing third in 6:41:30.

Stevens won the 2020 USA Olympic Trial 20k race walk event in Eugene, Oregon, finishing in 1:35.13, over four minutes ahead of the second-place finisher. Stevens' boyfriend Nick Christie won the men's 20k at the same meet.

Stevens went on to compete in the delayed 2020 Summer Olympics in Tokyo in 2021, where she finished in 33rd place out of a field of 58 athletes. At the 2022 World Athletics Championships Stevens finished the 20 km race walking competition in 24th place.

== Sexual abuse by former coach ==
Stevens was raped by her former coach, Andreas “Dre” Gustafsson of Sweden, for over two and a half years starting in February 2017. Concerned that he was victimizing other female athletes, she filed a complaint with the U.S. Center for SafeSport in late 2020. In August 2022, SafeSport provisionally suspended Gustafsson for “sexual misconduct.” USA Track & Field told its members that Gustafsson was prohibited “from participating, in any capacity, in any event, program, activity, or competition authorized by, organized by or under the auspices of the USOPC, the National Governing Bodies recognized by the USOPC, a Local Affiliated Organization ... or at a facility under the jurisdiction of the same.”
