= Elmira, California =

Elmira
- Unincorporated Community; Census Designated Place
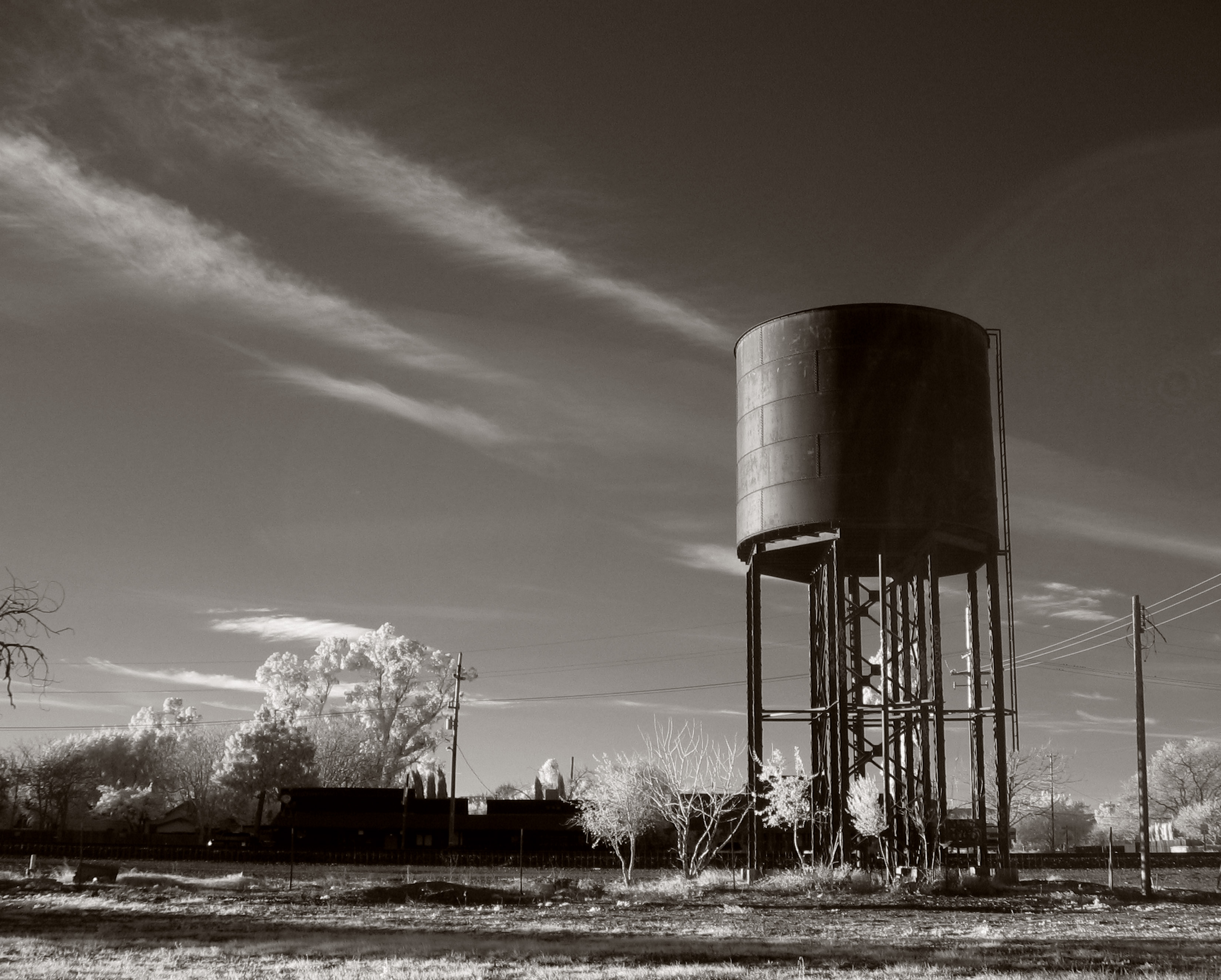

- Location in Solano County and the state of California

- Location in the United States
- Coordinates: 38°21′0″N 121°54′29″W
- Country: United States
- State: California
- County: Solano

Government
  - State senator: Christopher Cabaldon (D)
  - Assemblymember: Lori Wilson (D)
  - U.S. Congress: John Garamendi (D)

Area
  - Total: 0.531 sq mi (1.376 km^{2})
  - Land: 0.531 sq mi (1.376 km^{2})
  - Water: 0 sq mi (0 km^{2}) 0%
- Elevation: 75 ft (23 m)

Population (2020)
  - Total: 193
  - Density: 363/sq mi (140/km^{2})
- Time zone: UTC-8 (PST)
  - Summer (DST): UTC-7 (PDT)
- ZIP code: 95625
- Area code: 707
- FIPS code: 06-22146
- GNIS feature ID: 1655995

Elmira is a census-designated place (CDP) in Solano County, California, United States. The population was 319 at the 2024 census.

== History ==
Elmira, California, is named after Elmira, New York.

In the 19th and early 20th century, Elmira was the major railroad stop between Fairfield and Davis. To reach Vacaville, travelers had to take a spur from Elmira. When U.S. Route 40 was built through Vacaville, the population of Vacaville increased in size, while the population of Elmira declined.

== Geography ==
According to the United States Census Bureau, the CDP has a total area of 0.531 square miles (1.38 km^{2}), all land.

== Demographics ==
Historical population
Census	Pop.	Note	%±
2000	205		—
2010	188		−8.3%
2020	193		2.7%
U.S. Decennial Census; 1860–1870 1880–1890; 1900 1910 1920; 1930 1940 1950; 1960 1970 1980; 1990 2000 2010

Elmira first appeared as a census designated place in the 2000 U.S. census.

=== 2010 ===
The 2010 United States census reported that Elmira had a population of 188. The population density was 353.9 inhabitants per square mile (136.6/km^{2}). The racial makeup of Elmira was 150 (79.8%) White, 10 (3.5%) African American, 10 (5.3%) Native American, 2 (1.1%) Asian, 0 (0.0%) Pacific Islander, 17 (9.0%) from other races, and 8 (4.3%) from two or more races. Hispanic or Latino of any race were 47 people (25.0%).

The whole population lived in households, no one lived in non-institutionalized group quarters and no one was institutionalized.

There were 85 households, 20 (23.5%) had children under the age of 18 living in them, 34 (40.0%) were opposite-sex married couples living together, 6 (7.1%) had a female householder with no husband present, 7 (8.2%) had a male householder with no wife present. There were 6 (7.1%) unmarried opposite-sex partnerships, and 0 (0%) same-sex married couples or partnerships. 33 households (38.8%) were one person and 9 (10.6%) had someone living alone who was 65 or older. The average household size was 2.21. There were 47 families (55.3% of households); the average family size was 3.00.

The age distribution was 34 people (18.1%) under the age of 18, 14 people (7.4%) aged 18 to 24, 49 people (26.1%) aged 25 to 44, 65 people (34.6%) aged 45 to 64, and 26 people (13.8%) who were 65 or older. The median age was 43.4 years. The population was 54% male and 46% female.

There were 91 housing units at an average density of 171.3 per square mile (66.1/km^{2}), of which 45 (52.9%) were owner-occupied, and 40 (47.1%) were occupied by renters. The homeowner vacancy rate was 0%; the rental vacancy rate was 7.0%. 101 people (53.7% of the population) lived in owner-occupied housing units and 87 people (46.3%) lived in rental housing units.

=== 2000 ===
At the 2000 census, there were 205 people, 86 households, and 52 families in the CDP. The population density was 378.5 inhabitants per square mile (146.1/km^{2}). There were 92 housing units at an average density of 169.8 per square mile (65.6/km^{2}). The racial makeup of the CDP was 87.80% White, 1.46% African American, 1.46% Pacific Islander, 6.34% from other races, and 2.93% from two or more races. Hispanic or Latino of any race were 26.34% of the population.

Of the 86 households 27.9% had children under the age of 18 living with them, 39.5% were married couples living together, 12.8% had a female householder with no husband present, and 39.5% were non-families. 36.0% of households were one person and 7.0% were one person aged 65 or older. The average household size was 2.38 and the average family size was 3.12.

The age distribution was 24.9% under the age of 18, 7.8% from 18 to 24, 29.3% from 25 to 44, 29.8% from 45 to 64, and 8.3% 65 or older. The median age was 38 years. The population was 52.7% male and 47.3% female.

The median household income was $48,438, based on a sample of the population. The per capita income for the CDP was $35,397. None of the families and 7.0% of the population were living below the poverty line.

== Education ==
The CDP is served by the Vacaville Unified School District.

== See also ==
- Vaca Valley and Clear Lake Railroad
