= Allendale, Solano County, California =

Allendale
- CDP
- Location within California Location within the United States
- Coordinates: 38°26′41″N 121°56′35″W
- Country: United States
- State: California
- County: Solano
- Metro area: San Francisco Bay Area

Area
  - Total: 6.20 sq mi (16.06 km^{2})
  - Land: 6.14 sq mi (15.89 km^{2})
  - Water: 0.062 sq mi (0.16 km^{2}) 1.02%
- Elevation: 121 ft (37 m)

Population (2020)
  - Total: 1,651
  - Density: 269.0/sq mi (103.88/km^{2})
- Time zone: UTC-8 (Pacific (PST))
  - Summer (DST): UTC-7 (PDT)
- Area code: 707
- FIPS code: 06-00996
- GNIS feature ID: 218147

Allendale is a census-designated place (CDP) in Solano County, California, United States. Allendale is located along Interstate 505, 6.5 miles (10.5 km) west of Dixon. The population was 1,651 at the 2020 census.

== Geography ==
According to the United States Census Bureau, the CDP covers an area of 6.2 square miles (16.1 km^{2}), of which 98.98% is land and 1.02% is water.

== Demographics ==
Historical population
Census	Pop.	Note	%±
2010	1,506		—
2020	1,651		9.6%
U.S. Decennial Census; 1860–1870 1880-1890; 1900 1910 1920; 1930 1940 1950; 1960 1970 1980; 1990 2000 2010

Allendale first appeared as a census designated place in the 2010 U.S. census.

The 2020 United States census reported that Allendale had a population of 1,651. The population density was 269.1 inhabitants per square mile (103.9/km^{2}). The racial makeup of Allendale was 73.2% White, 3.1% African American, 0.9% Native American, 2.3% Asian, 0.2% Pacific Islander, 7.0% from other races, and 13.2% from two or more races. Hispanic or Latino of any race were 17.3% of the population.

The census reported that 99.7% of the population lived in households and 0.3% lived in non-institutionalized group quarters.

There were 595 households, out of which 31.3% included children under the age of 18, 76.0% were married-couple households, 4.0% were cohabiting couple households, 12.1% had a female householder with no partner present, and 7.9% had a male householder with no partner present. 11.3% of households were one person, and 7.9% were one person aged 65 or older. The average household size was 2.77. There were 500 families (84.0% of all households).

The age distribution was 17.1% under the age of 18, 6.5% aged 18 to 24, 18.6% aged 25 to 44, 35.1% aged 45 to 64, and 22.7% who were 65 years of age or older. The median age was 51.3 years. For every 100 females, there were 95.6 males.

There were 619 housing units at an average density of 100.9 units per square mile (39.0 units/km^{2}), of which 595 (96.1%) were occupied. Of these, 90.6% were owner-occupied, and 9.4% were occupied by renters.

== Education ==
The CDP is served by the Vacaville Unified School District.

== Notable person ==
- John Udell, diarist of the American Frontier; lived in Allendale from 1859 to 1871.

== Literary reference ==
The setting of Ray Bradbury's 1950 short story "There Will Come Soft Rains" is Allendale, California. The story takes place on August 4, 2026, and describes a lone house still standing in the destroyed city after an apparent nuclear attack. It is unclear whether Allendale in the story refers to the Solano County locality, the former town in Alameda County, or neither.
