= Vacaville Unified School District =

School district in California, United States

Vacaville Unified School District is a school district headquartered in Vacaville, California.

It includes the majority of the Vacaville city limits, as well as the Allendale and Elmira census-designated places and the majority of the Hartley CDP.

== History ==
Ed Santopadre became the superintendent in 2022.

In 2024, there was a referendum for a school bond, but the district's residents did not vote in favor of it.

== Schools ==
It includes the following campuses:

=== High schools ===
- Buckingham Collegiate Charter Academy
- Ernest Kimme Academy for Independent Learners (K–12)
- Ernest Kimme Work Readiness and Alternative Pathway (Grades 7–12)
- Vacaville High School
- Will C. Wood High School

=== Middle schools ===
- Ernest Kimme Academy for Independent Learners (K-12)
- Kairos Public Schools Vacaville Academy (Charter School)
- Sierra Vista K-8
- Vaca Peña Middle School
- Willis Jepson Middle School

=== Elementary schools ===
- Ace Program
- Alamo Elementary School
- Browns Valley Elementary School
- Cooper Elementary School
- Edwin Markham Elementary School
- Ernest Kimme Academy for Independent Learners (K-12)
- Eugene Padan Elementary School
- Fairmont Charter Elementary School
- Hemlock Elementary School
- Jean Callison Elementary
- Kairos Public Schools Vacaville Academy (K-8)
- Orchard Elementary
- Sierra Vista K-8

=== Alternate schools and programs ===
- Ernest Kimme Charter Academy for Independent Learning
- Muzetta Thrower Adult Education Center
