= Vanden High School =

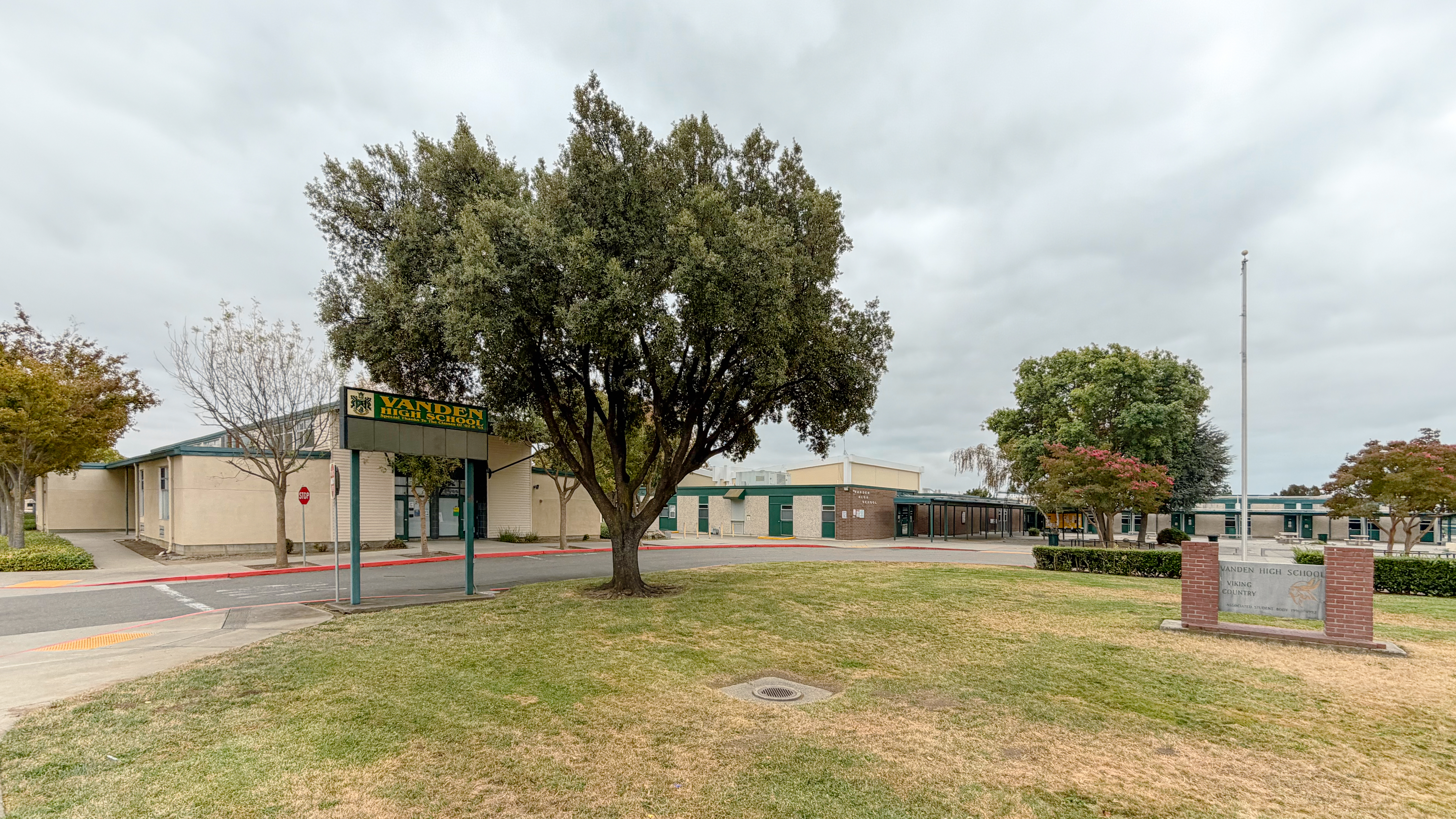

Location
- 2951 Markeley Lane; Fairfield, California 94533; United States; 38°16′57″N 121°57′43″W

Information
- School district: Travis Unified School District
- Superintendent: Pamela Conklin
- Principal: Kristin Shields
- Staff: 69.88 (FTE)
- Enrollment: 1,619 (2023-2024)
- Student to teacher ratio: 23.17
- Colors: Dark Green, Gold and White
- Athletics conference: Solano County Athletics
- Nickname: Vikings
- Newspaper: Valhalla
- Yearbook: Vandenhighalumni
- Website: School website

Vanden High School is a high school in Fairfield, California. It is in the Travis Unified School District and serves children from southern Vacaville, eastern Fairfield, and Travis Air Force Base. This school serves grades 9–12. The school's mascot is the Vikings.

== Athletics ==
The following sports are offered at Vanden:

- Baseball
- Basketball
- Cheerleading
- Cross-country running
- Football
- Soccer
- Softball
- Tennis
- Track and field
- Volleyball
- Wrestling

== Notable alumni ==
- Melvin Byrd, former professional football player
