= Hartley, California =

Hartley
- census-designated place
- Location of Hartley in Solano County, California.

- Position in California.
- Coordinates: 38°25′13″N 121°57′03″W
- Country: United States
- State: California
- County: Solano

Area
  - Total: 6.498 sq mi (16.829 km^{2})
  - Land: 6.472 sq mi (16.763 km^{2})
  - Water: 0.025 sq mi (0.065 km^{2}) 0.39%
- Elevation: 131 ft (40 m)

Population (2020)
  - Total: 2,430
  - Density: 375/sq mi (145/km^{2})
- Time zone: UTC-8 (Pacific (PST))
  - Summer (DST): UTC-7 (PDT)
- GNIS feature ID: 2583031

Hartley is a census-designated place (CDP) in Solano County, California, United States. Hartley sits at a mean elevation of 131 feet (40 m). The 2020 United States census reported Hartley's population as 2,430.

== Geography ==
According to the United States Census Bureau, the CDP covers an area of 6.5 square miles (16.8 km^{2}), of which 99.61% is land and 0.39% is water.

=== Climate ===
According to the Köppen Climate Classification system, Hartley has a warm-summer Mediterranean climate, abbreviated "Csa" on climate maps.

== Demographics ==
Historical population
| Census | Pop. | Note | %± |
|---|---|---|---|
| 2010 | 2,510 | | — |
| 2020 | 2,430 | | −3.2% |
U.S. Decennial Census; 2010

=== 2020 census ===
As of the 2020 census, Hartley had a population of 2,430, with a population density of 375.5 inhabitants per square mile (145.0/km^{2}).

The census reported that 99.8% of the population lived in households, 6 people (0.2%) lived in non-institutionalized group quarters, and no one was institutionalized. 7.3% of residents lived in urban areas, while 92.7% lived in rural areas.

The age distribution was 19.1% under the age of 18, 6.1% aged 18 to 24, 23.0% aged 25 to 44, 30.3% aged 45 to 64, and 21.4% who were 65 years of age or older. The median age was 47.0 years. For every 100 females, there were 97.1 males, and for every 100 females age 18 and over there were 97.3 males age 18 and over.

There were 849 households, out of which 26.3% had children under the age of 18 living in them. Of all households, 61.5% were married-couple households, 3.7% were cohabiting couple households, 14.7% were households with a male householder and no spouse or partner present, and 20.1% were households with a female householder and no spouse or partner present. About 20.1% of households were made up of individuals, and 10.5% had someone living alone who was 65 years of age or older. The average household size was 2.86. There were 645 families (76.0% of all households).

There were 899 housing units at an average density of 138.9 units per square mile (53.6 units/km^{2}), of which 849 (94.4%) were occupied. Of these, 86.0% were owner-occupied, and 14.0% were occupied by renters. 5.6% of housing units were vacant; the homeowner vacancy rate was 0.1% and the rental vacancy rate was 4.0%.

Racial composition as of the 2020 census
| Race | Number | Percent |
|---|---|---|
| White | 1,630 | 67.1% |
| Black or African American | 63 | 2.6% |
| American Indian and Alaska Native | 34 | 1.4% |
| Asian | 99 | 4.1% |
| Native Hawaiian and Other Pacific Islander | 9 | 0.4% |
| Some other race | 262 | 10.8% |
| Two or more races | 333 | 13.7% |
| Hispanic or Latino (of any race) | 580 | 23.9% |

=== 2010 census ===
Hartley first appeared as a census designated place in the 2010 U.S. census.

=== Income and poverty ===
In 2023, the US Census Bureau estimated that the median household income was $120,354, and the per capita income was $60,227. About 1.1% of families and 7.5% of the population were below the poverty line.

== Education ==
Most of the CDP is served by the Vacaville Unified School District, though a section in the east is within the Dixon Unified School District.
