= Travis Unified School District =

School district in California, United States

Address
- 2751 De Ronde Drive Fairfield, California, 94533; United States
- Coordinates: 38°16′57″N 121°57′42″W

District information
- Type: Public
- Motto: Reaching beyond the boundaries to build a community of learners
- Grades: K–12
- Superintendent: Tiffany Benson
- Schools: 8
- Budget: $8,367 per student
- NCES District ID: 0639630

Students and staff
- Students: 5,284 (2020–2021)
- Teachers: 230.07 (FTE)
- Staff: 218.76 (FTE)
- Student–teacher ratio: 22.97:1
- Athletic conference: Solano County Athletics
- Colors: Blue and Gold

Other information
- Teachers' unions: California Teachers Association
- Website: www.travisusd.org

Travis Unified School District is a Unified School District located in Fairfield. It serves students from eastern Fairfield, southern Vacaville, and Travis A.F.B., in a total of 8 schools throughout its district. These schools include 1 high school, 1 alternative high school, 1 middle school, and 5 elementary schools. The elementary schools are Scandia Elementary School, Travis Elementary School, Center Elementary School, Cambridge Elementary School, and Foxboro Elementary School. The high schools include 1 alternative high school in Travis Education Center (TEC) and 1 public high school in Vanden High School.

== School information ==
The following is information on which schools serve which areas of students:

- Scandia Elementary School and Travis Elementary School serve students from Travis A.F.B.
- Cambridge and Foxboro Elementary Schools serve students from Vacaville.
- Center Elementary School serves students from Fairfield.

== Athletics ==
The following sports are available in most schools in the TUSD:

- Baseball (only at the high schools)
- Basketball
- Cheerleading (only at the high schools)
- Cross-country
- football
- Golf (only at the high schools)
- Soccer
- Softball (only at the high schools)
- Tennis (only at the high schools)
- Track and Field
- Volleyball
- Wrestling (only at the high schools)

== Extracurricular activities ==
The following are extracurricular activities available at certain schools in TUSD as labeled below:

- Academic Decathlon (only at Vanden)
- AFJROTC (only at Vanden)
- Art (at middle and high schools)
- Band (at middle and high schools)
- Clubs (at middle and high schools)
- Drama (only at high schools)
- Journalism (only at Vanden)
- Leadership/Student Council (at middle and high schools)
- National Honor Society (only at Golden West and Vanden)
- Robotics (only at Golden West and Vanden)
- Theater (only at Vanden)
- Yearbook (only at high schools)

== Notable people ==
- Deone Bucannon NFL Safety for the Arizona Cardinals
- Jerry Horton Lead guitarist and backing vocalist for rock band Papa Roach
- Chester See YouTube personality, actor, musician
