= Denverton, California =

Unincorporated community in California, United States

- Unincorporated community
- Location within California Location within the United States
- Coordinates: 38°13′29″N 121°53′51″W
- Country: United States
- State: California
- County: Solano
- Elevation: 10 ft (3.0 m)
- Time zone: UTC-8 (Pacific (PST))
  - Summer (DST): UTC-7 (PDT)
- Area code: 707
- GNIS feature ID: 252662

Denverton (formerly known as Nurse's Landing) is an unincorporated community in Solano County, California, United States. The community is situated on California State Route 12, 8 miles (13 km) east of Fairfield.

== History ==
Denverton was named after James W. Denver in 1858, who served as California Secretary of State from 1853 to 1855 and as a congressman for the district from 1855 to 1857. Its former name of Nurse's Landing was named after Dr. Stephen K. Nurse.

The Denverton Post Office was established per the workings of Mr. S.K. Nurse in 1858, and Nurse was then appointed as its postmaster.

In 1912, Denverton was referred to as a township in a history book written at that time.
